= Scott Caan =

American actor (born 1976)

- Caan in 2026
- Born: August 23, 1976 (age 50); Los Angeles, California, U.S.
- Other names: Scotty Caan; Mad Skillz
- Occupations: Actor; director; photographer; rapper; writer
- Years active: 1993–present
- Spouse: Kacy Byxbee
- Children: 1
- Parents: James Caan (father); Sheila Marie Ryan (mother)

Scott Caan (born August 23, 1976) is an American actor, director, photographer, writer, and former rapper. He received his breakthrough role in Ocean's Eleven as Turk Malloy, whom he played in the Ocean's trilogy, and starred as Detective Danny "Danno" Williams in the CBS television series Hawaii Five-0 (2010–2020), for which he was nominated for a Golden Globe Award. Caan had a recurring role as manager Scott Lavin in the HBO television series Entourage (2009–2011). In the 1990s, he was a rapper and was a part of hip hop group The Whooliganz with The Alchemist, under the pseudonym Mad Skillz.

== Early life ==
Caan was born on August 23, 1976, in Los Angeles, California, the son of actor James Caan and Sheila Marie Ryan, an actress and former model. His paternal grandparents were Jewish immigrants from Germany.

== Career ==
Caan was a roadie for the hip hop groups Cypress Hill and House of Pain. Caan was also a member of the hip hop duo The Whooliganz as Mad Skillz (with producer and fellow MC The Alchemist as Mudfoot). The Whooliganz signed a record deal with Tommy Boy/Warner Bros. records and recorded the album Make Way for the W, but after their first single "Put Your Handz Up" was released the album was shelved and the duo was dropped by Tommy Boy. In 1995, the Whooliganz' song "Whooliganz" was released as a single in the UK, but Caan and the Alchemist had already parted ways. Caan reunited with his former partner The Alchemist in 2014 on the Step Brothers project Lord Steppington, performing on the song "Byron G" with musician Evidence.

After enrolling at the Playhouse West acting school in Los Angeles, Caan began acting in the late 1990s, appearing in a number of independent films and low-budget films. His first role in a major motion picture was that of Charlie Tweeder, a reckless philandering Texas high school football wide receiver in the teen movie Varsity Blues (1999), alongside James Van Der Beek and Paul Walker. In the same year, he played the role of Drew in the film Saturn (also known as Speed of Life). Caan subsequently appeared in several studio films, including Ready to Rumble (2000) co-starring David Arquette, Boiler Room (2000) co-starring Vin Diesel, Gone in 60 Seconds (2000) as Tumbler, and American Outlaws (2001) co-starring Colin Farrell, in which Caan played 19th-century outlaw Cole Younger. In 2003, Caan made his directorial debut with the film Dallas 362, which won a prize at the 2003 Las Vegas Film Festival.

Caan appeared in the feature film trilogy Ocean's Eleven, Ocean's Twelve, and Ocean's Thirteen. In 2005, he co-starred with Paul Walker (with whom he had appeared in Varsity Blues) in the action film Into the Blue. Caan wrote and directed the 2006 comedy The Dog Problem, and appeared as a supporting character in the film as well. He appeared on the television series Entourage in a recurring role as talent manager Scott Lavin from seasons six to eight.

Caan played Detective Danny "Danno" Williams in Hawaii Five-0 (a re-imagining of the 1968 Hawaii Five-O television series). The new series premiered on September 20, 2010, and in 2011 he was nominated for a Golden Globe Award for Best Supporting Actor – Series, Miniseries or Television Film for his performance.

BuddyTV ranked him 95th on its list of "TV's Sexiest Men of 2011".

In addition to acting, Caan has also pursued a career in photography. Inspired and trained by cinematographer Phil Parmet while working together on the 2003 film Dallas 362, Caan has been shooting ever since. "In preparing for the film," Caan said, "Phil inspired me to learn about lenses, lights, frames, and the operation of a 250 millimeter camera. By the time the film was over, I wanted to shoot the next one." In 2009, he published his first collection of photographs in a 256-page book titled Scott Caan Photographs, Vol. 1. The book was edited and designed by Howard Nourmand, and includes an introduction by Steve Olson.

== Personal life ==
Caan has a black belt in Brazilian jiu-jitsu. In July 2014, Caan's girlfriend Kacy Byxbee gave birth to their daughter.

As of 2012, Caan was an active volunteer with several organizations that introduce children with autism to surfing.

== Filmography ==
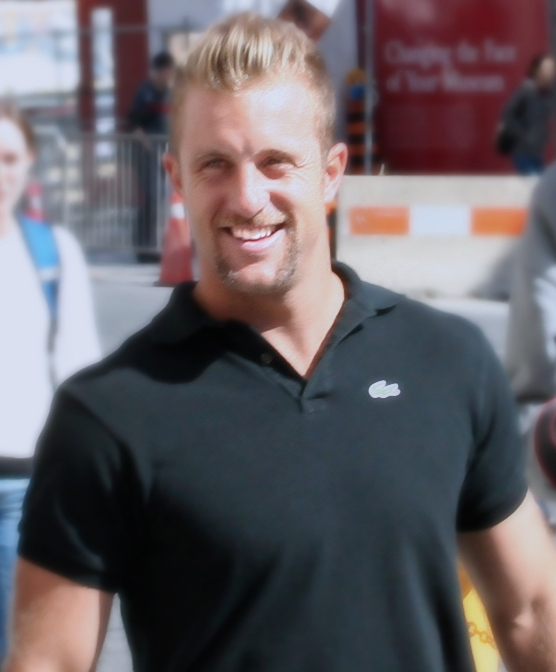
Caan at the 2006 Toronto International Film Festival

=== Film ===
Year	Title	Role	Notes
1994	A Boy Called Hate	Steve / Hate	
1995	Aaron Gillespie Will Make You a Star	Sean	
1995	Last Resort	Strut	Nominated – Critics Award at CineVegas (shared with Harvey Silver)
1997	Nowhere	'Ducky'	
1997	Bongwater	Bobby	
1998	Nowhere to Go	Romeo	
1998	Enemy of the State	NSA Agent Jones	
1999	Speed of Life	Drew	
1999	Varsity Blues	Charlie Tweeder	
1999	Saturn	Drew	
1999	Black and White	Scotty	
2000	Boiler Room	Richie O'Flaherty	
2000	Ready to Rumble	Sean Dawkins	
2000	Gone in 60 Seconds	Timmy 'Tumbler' Tummel	
2001	American Outlaws	Cole Younger	
2001	Novocaine	Duane Ivey	
2001	Ocean's Eleven	Turk Malloy	Nominated – MTV Movie Award for Best On-Screen Team; Nominated – Phoenix Film Critics Society Award for Best Acting Ensemble
2002	Sonny	Jesse	
2003	Dallas 362	Dallas	Also writer and director Critics Award at CineVegas
2004	In Enemy Hands	Lieutenant Commander Randall Sullivan	
2004	Ocean's Twelve	Turk Malloy	
2005	Into the Blue	Bryce Dunn	
2006	Friends with Money	Mike	
2006	Lonely Hearts	Detective Reilly	
2006	The Dog Problem	Casper	Also writer and director
2007	Brooklyn Rules	Carmine Mancuso	
2007	Ocean's Thirteen	Turk Malloy	Nominated – Teen Choice Award for Choice Movie: Chemistry
2007	Stories USA	Hayden Field	Segment "Life Makes Sense If You're Famous"
2008	Meet Dave	Officer Dooley	
2009	Mercy	Johnny Ryan	Also writer and producer
2009	Deep in the Valley	Rod Cannon	
2010	A Beginner's Guide to Endings	Cal White	
2013	3 Geezers!	Scott	
2015	Rock the Kasbah	Jake	
2016	Two for One	Alexander Clarke	
2018	Untogether	Ellis	
2023	One Day as a Lion	Jackie Powers	Also writer and executive producer
2026	The Further Mis-Adventures of Cliff Booth	Charlie Peters	

=== Television ===
Year	Title	Role	Notes
2009–2011	Entourage	Scott Lavin	19 episodes
2010–2020	Hawaii Five-0	Danny "Danno" Williams	Main cast TV Guide Award for Favorite Bromance (shared with Alex O'Loughlin) (2013); Nominated – Golden Globe Award for Best Supporting Actor – Series, Miniseries or Television Film (2011); Nominated – Teen Choice Award for Choice TV Actor: Action (2013)
2012	NCIS: Los Angeles	Danny "Danno" Williams	Crossover: "Touch of Death"
2017	Vice Principals	Sweat Dogs Trainer	Episode: "Think Change"
2023–2025	Alert: Missing Persons Unit	Jason Grant	Main cast
2026	NCIS: New York	Nick Schaeffer	Main cast
