= List of The Lion King (franchise) characters =

The main characters in the 1994 film The Lion King. From left to right: Shenzi, Scar, Kamari Azizi , Rafiki, Mufasa, Simba, Sarabi, Zazu, Timon, and Pumbaa. Bottom right: Nala and Sarafina.

The following is a list of characters appearing in Disney's The Lion King franchise. It includes characters from the 1994 film, its direct-to-video sequel and prequel, its two television series, printed media, and the prequel to its 2019 photorealistic remake.

== Introduced in The Lion King ==
=== Simba ===
Simba (voiced by Matthew Broderick as adult Simba in the films with Joseph Williams providing his singing voice in The Lion King; Jonathan Taylor Thomas as a cub in The Lion King with Jason Weaver and Evan Saucedo providing his cub form's singing voice; Matt Weinberg as a cub in The Lion King 1½; Cam Clarke in Timon & Pumbaa and Kingdom Hearts II, as well as his singing voice in The Lion King II: Simba's Pride; Rob Lowe in The Lion Guard; Donald Glover in the 2019 film and Mufasa: The Lion King and JD McCrary as a cub in the 2019 film) is the main protagonist of The Lion King franchise. He is the son of Mufasa and Sarabi, Scar's nephew, Nala's mate, Sarafina's son-in-law and Kiara and Kion's father as well as Rani and Kovu's father-in-law. After defeating Scar, Simba takes Mufasa's place as King of Pride Rock before marrying Nala and having Kiara and Kion with her. His name means "lion" in Swahili.

In The Lion King II: Simba's Pride, Simba is an overprotective father of Kiara and obtains a great hatred of the Outsiders, a group of lions led by a lioness named Zira, whom he exiled due to their reliability to Scar. He finally lets go of his hate after Kiara and Kovu stopped the battle between the Pride Lands and the Outsiders because as lions they are one.

In The Lion Guard, Simba fathers Kion, and refuses to accept Kion's decision to allow non-lion animals into the Lion Guard in the first place. However, he accepts his proposal afterwards. In the show's second season, after a failed attempt on Simba's life, orchestrated by the spirit of Scar, Simba, and Kion plot to defeat him once and for all. As of season three, Scar's ghost has been conquered and his followers have become neutral under the rule of Jasiri, who becomes the new Outlands leader. However, due to a facial wound caused by a snake bite during the battle, Kion journeys to find the Tree of Life, to get healed. Simba bids his son farewell on his trip. Afterwards, he welcomes Kion home following his journey and accepts his love to Rani of the Night Pride by accepting her as his daughter-in-law after Kion and Rani's marriage and Kion's coronation as King of the Tree of Life.

=== Nala ===
Nala (voiced by Moira Kelly in the films with Sally Dworsky providing her singing voice in The Lion King; Niketa Calame as a cub in The Lion King with Laura Williams providing her cub form's singing voice; Gabrielle Union in The Lion Guard; Beyoncé in the 2019 film and Mufasa: The Lion King and Shahadi Wright Joseph as a cub in the 2019 film) is Sarafina's daughter, Simba's best friend and later mate, Kiara and Kion's mother and Mufasa and Sarabi's daughter-in-law. She is also Rani and Kovu's mother-in-law by the end of the second film and the third season of The Lion Guard. Although she is a prominent character in The Lion King, she makes minor appearances in The Lion King II: Simba's Pride, The Lion King 1½, and The Lion Guard.

In The Lion King, she is portrayed as Simba's childhood friend (whom she is betrothed to when they were born and younger infants by their parents). After helping Simba enter the elephant graveyard, she has to be rescued by her future father-in-law, Mufasa, when the hyenas attack them. Several years later, Nala encounters Simba as a young adult and develops a romantic relationship with him. After returning to Pride Rock, she helps Simba defeat Scar and take his rightful place as King of Pride Rock afterwards she becomes Simba's wife and mate as well as his Queen.

In The Lion King II: Simba's Pride, Nala is depicted as slightly older, calmer, and less overprotective of Kiara than her mate, Simba. She was the only lion who supported her daughter's relationship with Kovu throughout the second film. By the end of the second film, she and Simba are presented at their daughter's wedding and she accepts her son-in-law into her family as well as her new king of the Pride Lands.

During the three seasons of The Lion Guard, she has a second cub; a male lion named Kion. By the end of the series, (like Simba) she accepts her son's marriage to the Queen of the Tree of Life and leader of the Night Pride, Queen Rani while gaining her as her daughter-in-law.

=== Timon and Pumbaa ===
Timon (voiced by Nathan Lane in the films and earlier episodes of Timon & Pumbaa; Quinton Flynn in earlier episodes of Timon & Pumbaa; Kevin Schon in later episodes of Timon & Pumbaa and in The Lion Guard; Bruce Lanoil in the video games and Billy Eichner in the 2019 remake film and Mufasa: The Lion King) and Pumbaa (voiced by Ernie Sabella in most appearances; Leslie Hedger in Disney's Extreme Skate Adventure and Seth Rogen in the 2019 film, Chip 'n Dale: Rescue Rangers, and Mufasa: The Lion King) are a meerkat and common warthog duo. Timon being an insouciant, yet trustworthy friend, while Pumbaa is kind-hearted and courageous with occasional childlike naivety. The pair act as comedy relief, and as friend and mentor to Simba throughout the film series.

When they first meet Simba in The Lion King, they save him from a flock of vultures. They take him in and bring him to their home in an oasis. Later, after Simba grows up and returns to the Pride Lands to battle Scar, they helped Simba stop Scar's tyrannical reign and they become Simba's royal advisors.

In The Lion King II: Simba's Pride, Timon and Pumbaa are assigned by Simba to keep watch over his daughter Kiara when she goes to play in The Pride Lands and later on her first hunt. They later aid Simba and his pride in the fight against Scar's vengeful follower Zira and her pride the Outsiders. After the Outsiders reform and rejoin Simba's pride, Timon and Pumbaa look on as Kiara marries Zira's son Kovu.

Although they are supporting characters in the first two films, they are featured as the main characters in The Lion King 1½ as well as in the TV series Timon & Pumbaa.

In the TV series The Lion Guard, they are the adoptive uncles of the honey badger Bunga and make their home at Hakuna Matata Falls.

=== Scar ===
Scar (voiced by Jeremy Irons in The Lion King with Jim Cummings providing his singing voice; Jim Cummings in The Lion King II: Simba's Pride and The Lion King: Simba's Mighty Adventure; James Horan in Kingdom Hearts II, Disney's Extreme Skate Adventure, and Sorcerers of the Magic Kingdom; David Oyelowo in The Lion Guard; Chiwetel Ejiofor in the 2019 film and Kelvin Harrison Jr. in Mufasa: The Lion King.) is the main antagonist of The Lion King franchise. He is a black-maned lion who is Mufasa's younger brother, Simba's uncle, and Kovu's adoptive father. His name refers to his scarred eye. In The Lion King, by murdering Mufasa and exiling Simba, he becomes "King of the Pride Lands". However, years later, Simba returns to Pride Rock and overthrows Scar to become King of the Pride Lands. Scar survives the fall but is then attacked and killed by his hyena minions after they overheard him attempting to deceive Simba by betraying them.

As depicted in The Lion King: Six New Adventures and Mufasa: The Lion King, his birth name was Taka, but he was given the name "Scar" after he betrayed Mufasa to a rival pack.

In The Lion King II: Simba's Pride, it is revealed that Scar had gained loyalty from a group of lions who were exiled from Pride Rock by Simba to the Outlands in the wake of Scar's death, with Scar's longtime mate, Zira, being their leader. Scar is mentioned several times by the characters but makes two cameos. His first appearance is during Simba's nightmare, where he morphs into his adopted son Kovu and throws Simba into the stampede that killed Mufasa, similarly to the first film. His second appearance is during Kovu's exile in which Kovu looks into his reflection and instead of his, he sees the image of his adopted father. At the end of the film, Kovu marries Kiara, Simba and Nala's daughter, and Scar's great-niece, and becomes Simba and Nala's son-in-law and successor.

As an alternate background in The Lion Guard, Scar was once the leader of the titular group and possessed the Roar of the Elders, but lost it after using it to destroy the other members of his Lion Guard when they refused to help him overthrow Mufasa as king, as the Roar is meant to be used for good and not evil. In season two, Kion, Simba's son and the leader of the new Lion Guard, unknowingly summons Scar back as a fiery spirit in a volcano after using the Roar in anger when Janja provokes him. Scar then conspires with the animals in the Outlands to take over the Pride Lands and defeat the Lion Guard and Simba, who were initially unaware of his return. Later in the season, the Lion Guard find out that Scar has returned, while they are in the Outlands getting volcanic ash needed to cure Simba of a scorpion sting. In season three's one-hour premiere "Battle for the Pride Lands", Scar continues to battle the Lion Guard, who are now adolescents. It is also revealed that Scar got his scar after being bitten by a cobra as an adolescent while befriending a rogue lion from the Outlands. Angered, Scar used the Roar to kill the lion and snake, while Mufasa teased him and nicknamed him "Scar", leading to Scar plotting to dethrone Mufasa. At the end, Kion summons the Great Kings of the Past to rain upon Scar, thus destroying him once and for all.

In the 2019 film, Scar told Zazu to get help to rescue Simba while he goes to help him. This was a cover-up so that Scar can kill Mufasa. When Mufasa is dead and Simba has fled, Scar takes over as the ruler of the Pride Lands while allowing the hyenas to work with the lions. This led to overhunting. When Sarabi refuses to become Scar's mate, Scar makes things worse by having the hyenas eat first and they do not leave much behind. By the second advancement, Scar struck down Sarabi when she mentioned Mufasa. Like the films, Scar fought Simba and tried to blame Mufasa's death on the hyenas. When Scar is thrown off of Pride Rock, he survived the fall and was confronted by the hyenas. Scar states to them that if they build an army, they will retake the Pride Lands. Banzai and Ed state that they heard the insult towards them. Scar claims that he was trying to fool Simba and that there can still be a partnership between lions and hyenas. Shenzi states to Scar that he was right about a hyena's belly never being full. Scar strikes at some of the attacking hyenas until they swarm over him and kill him

Shenzi Azizi And Kamari

Shenzi (voiced by Whoopi Goldberg in the animated films; Tress MacNeille in Timon & Pumbaa and Kingdom Hearts II; Jenifer Lewis in Sorcerers of the Magic Kingdom; Florence Kasumba in the 2019 film), Azizi (voiced by Cheech Marin in the animated films, Kingdom Hearts II, and Sorcerers of the Magic Kingdom; and Rob Paulsen in Timon & Pumbaa and The Lion King: Simba's Mighty Adventure), and Kamari(voiced by Jim Cummings) are the three spotted hyenas who serve as Scar's minions and reside in the Elephant Graveyard. After Scar promises them and the rest of their fellow hyenas that they will have food in return for them helping him get rid of his brother Mufasa and nephew Simba to become King of the Pride Lands, the three hyenas trigger the wildebeest stampede which kills Mufasa and then chase Simba out of the Pride Lands on Scar's orders. When Simba returns to Pride Rock, Shenzi and Banzai are defeated by Pumbaa. The three turn on Scar when he tries to blame them for Mufasa's death and the ruin of the Pride Lands, and lead the rest of the hyenas into eating him alive during a wildfire.

In the original draft of the film, the hyenas were African wild dogs, referred to as "cape dogs" in the film. Their species may have been changed to illustrate the strong rivalry and competition between lions and hyenas in real life, where the competition is much stronger than between lions and other African savannah predators.make recurring appearances in Timon & Pumbaa. They are given their own segments titled "The Laughing Hyenas." In said segments, the hyenas are shown wandering around the Serengeti in search for food. At the end of the episode "TV Dinner", the hyenas replace television host Martin Partin, which may indicate that they are living a new life as directors and stars of the wildlife documentary show Kingdom of the Creatures, where they get fed during their new career. In later seasons, they made minor appearances trying to attack Timon and Pumbaa.

In The Lion King II: Simba's Pride, it was only mentioned by Nuka that the hyenas have left the Elephant Graveyard, most likely out of fear of Zira's wrath for betraying Scar. However, in the original draft of the film, Shenzi Azizi and Kamari were going to return as Zira's henchmen, with Whoopi Goldberg, Cheech Marin and Jim Cummings reprising their roles from the original film.

In The Lion King 1½, Shenzi, Azizi and Kamari act as the local predators who attack Timon's meerkat colony before their allegiance with Scar. To prevent the hyenas from protecting Scar, Timon and Pumbaa distract the trio with the help of Timon's family, before ultimately banishing them to the bottom of Pride Rock, allowing Simba to vanquish his uncle in battle and reclaim Pride Rock.

==== Shenzi Ed and Banzai (2019 remake) ====
Shenzi (voiced by Florence Kasumba) appears in the 2019 remake with a different personality. She is portrayed as a ruthless and cunning matriarch with a no-nonsense attitude and air of authority. She is also shown to have a rivalry with Nala. Ed and Banzai were replaced with (Ed voiced by Keegan-Michael Key) and Banzai(voiced by Eric André). Nevertheless, these two play largely similar roles to those of Kamari and Azizi in the original film, both can speak. As in the original film, the Hyenas hear the insult that Scar uses on them. When Scar is defeated and the hyena pack confronts him, Scar states that they can retake the Pride Lands if they build an army. Ed and Banzai state that they heard the insult he used on them. Scar claims that he was trying to fool Simba and that there can still be a partnership between lions and hyenas. Shenzi quotes: "There's only one true thing you ever said, Scar. A hyena's belly is never full." The hyenas then attack as Scar strikes at some of them before the hyenas swarm over Scar and kill him.

=== Mufasa ===
Mufasa (voiced by James Earl Jones in the films, The Lion Guard: Return of the Roar and the 2019 film and some other media from 1994 to 2019, Keith David in Simba's Mighty Adventure, House of Mouse and from 2024 onwards, Gary Anthony Williams in The Lion Guard and Aaron Pierre in Mufasa: The Lion King) is the overarching protagonist of The Lion King franchise. He is Scar's older brother, Sarabi's mate, Simba's father, Nala's father-in-law, and Kion and Kiara's paternal grandfather who is introduced as the King of the Pride Lands. The outstanding queen Uru of the Pride Lands alongside the brave King Ahadi are Mufasa's parents. His brother Scar's original name is Taka. Scar was a nice cub but turned sour when he noticed Mufasa was going to be future king and King Ahadi spent extra time with him to teach him about ruling the lands. The name "Mufasa" has an unknown origin, previously attributed to a fictional language called Manazoto. Mufasa is depicted as a just, wise, and responsible leader, a gentle but firm father, and a strong and fierce protector when sufficiently provoked. In The Lion King, he teaches Simba what a king is supposed to be, and how the king is responsible for protecting and maintaining the delicate balance of the ecosystem, and mediate problems between its creatures. However, Mufasa is killed after being thrown into a blue wildebeest stampede by Scar while rescuing Simba. He returns years later as a spirit in the clouds to encourage an older Simba to return to the Pride Lands and reclaim his rightful throne.

In The Lion King II: Simba's Pride, he instructs Rafiki to bring his granddaughter, Kiara, Simba's daughter, and Kovu, Scar's chosen heir, together to reunite the two lion prides.

In The Lion Guard, Mufasa serves as a spirit guide to his grandson Kion when he needs advice, and sometimes appears on his own when he notices he is troubled by something. When Kion fights against Scar's spirit and his army as a teenager, he gets bitten by Ushari, who gave him a scar on his left eye. As a result, during the journey to the Tree of Life, Kion stops communicating with his grandfather due to issues with his scar and personal concerns about turning evil like Scar, and Mufasa has become worried that he forgot about him, just like Simba did years ago when he became an adult. When they finally talk again, Mufasa reassures Kion that he would always be here for him no matter what; showing that regardless of his grandson's scar, he still loves him dearly and knows he has more compassion and honour than Scar. Alongside Askari and the previous queen of the Tree of Life, Janna, he proudly watches over Kion after his marriage to Rani by accepting her as his paternal granddaughter-in-law. Jones reprised his role in the pilot episode, but the character was voiced by Gary Anthony Williams in subsequent appearances.

Lion King directors Roger Allers and Rob Minkoff have described Jones's voice as powerful and similar to the roar of a lion.

Jones reprises his role in the 2019 remake of the film, directed by Jon Favreau. According to Favreau, Jones's lines remain mostly the same from the original film. Chiwetel Ejiofor, who plays Scar in the film, said that "the comfort of [Jones reprising his role] is going to be very rewarding in taking [the audience] on this journey again. It's a once-in-a-generation vocal quality".

In the follow-up to the 2019 film, Mufasa: The Lion King. In the film, it is revealed Mufasa was swept away in a flood as a young cub and separated from his biological family. He was adopted by a royal lion family, through which he becomes the adoptive brother to Scar. Braelyn and Brielle Rankins voice Mufasa as a cub.

=== Zazu ===
Zazu (voiced by Rowan Atkinson in The Lion King with Jeff Bennett providing his singing voice in "The Morning Report" from the 2003 Special Edition; Jim Piddock in Disney's Activity Center: The Lion King and The Lion King: Simba's Mighty Adventure; Edward Hibbert in Timon & Pumbaa, The Lion King II: Simba's Pride and The Lion King 1½; Jeff Bennett in The Lion Guard; John Oliver in the 2019 film and Preston Nyman in Mufasa: The Lion King) is a red-billed hornbill and majordomo to Mufasa and later Simba. After Mufasa's death, Zazu becomes a prisoner of Scar before being freed by Timon and Pumbaa when Simba returns to the Pride Lands. He eventually acts as a scout and advises Simba on royal protocol.

In Timon & Pumbaa, it is revealed that Zazu is not only a lion king's majordomo; he is a jungle administrator. In the episode "Zazu's Off-By-One Day", he is shown to be responsible for counting the population of the animals.

In the musical, Zazu is a puppet controlled by an actor dressed in blue striped clothes and a bowler hat, much like a stereotypical butler. Zazu's blue feathers have been replaced with white and the puppet is partially constructed from parachute silk with a slinky contained in the neck for ease in movement.

Also appearing in the 2019 remake of The Lion King, Zazu plays the same role as in the original film, but this time, he is introduced to Timon and Pumbaa and helps out in the battle by pecking a hyena numerous times. In Mufasa: The Lion King, Zazu is revealed to have originally been hired by Sarabi's father to protect and guide her while attempting to find a new place to live, due to a group of white lions taking away their land. Zazu and Sarabi join Mufasa and Scar, eventually settling in the Pride Lands together.

=== Rafiki ===
Rafiki (voiced by Robert Guillaume in most appearances prior to his death in 2017; Khary Payton in The Lion Guard and other media after Guillame's death and John Kani in the 2019 film (as elderly) and Kagiso Lediga in Mufasa: The Lion King (as younger)) is a West African-accented mandrill with an unnaturally long tail like a baboon. He lives in a baobab tree in the Pride Lands and performs his shamanistic services for the lions of Pride Rock. Rafiki's name means "friend" in Swahili.

In The Lion King, Rafiki is introduced in the opening scene when he travels to Pride Rock to perform newborn Simba's presentation ceremony. During the film, Rafiki sings a nonsense chant: "Asante sana, squash banana, wewe nugu, mimi hapana." This is a Swahili playground rhyme that translates to "Thank you very much (squash banana), you're a baboon and I'm not!" Like "hakuna matata" (no worries), the chant was heard by the filmmakers on their research trip to Kenya. Rafiki travels to the jungle where Simba lives with Timon and Pumbaa and teaches him lessons about learning from the past: "Yes, the past can hurt but, the way I see it you can either run from it, or learn from it" and then whacks him with his stick. During the battle for Pride Rock, Rafiki saves Simba from a hyena by whacking him with his stick, while fighting many more hyenas. At the end of the film, Rafiki presents Simba and Nala's newborn cub.

In The Lion King II: Simba's Pride, Rafiki is more closely involved with the affairs and politics of the pride and is often seen with the lions. Mufasa's spirit persuades him to bring Simba's daughter Kiara and Zira's son Kovu together as a way of uniting the Outsiders with pride. Rafiki tries to make them fall in love by singing to them about a place called "Upendi", which means "love" in Swahili. In the end, he blesses the union of Kovu and Kiara, and Kovu is welcomed into the pride. Rafiki appears briefly in The Lion King 1½, teaching Timon the philosophy of "Hakuna Matata", talking to Timon's mother about her son, and later convincing Timon to follow Simba to Pride Rock to confront Scar.

In the musical, the character of Rafiki was significantly modified. Because director Julie Taymor felt that the story lacked a strong female character, Rafiki was changed into a female mandrill and sangoma. She acts as narrator throughout the story, at one point speaking to the audience in a click language for comic effect. She sings the opening song "Circle of Life", a keening song called "Rafiki Mourns" following Mufasa's death, and a brief part in Nala's song "Shadowland" when she blesses Nala for her journey to find help. Instead of detecting Simba's scent on dust, Rafiki hears Simba's song "Endless Night" on the wind. Rafiki finds Simba and shows him that his father lives on in him through the song "He Lives in You". She is present during the battle, fighting a hyena, and adorns Simba with the king's mantle after his victory; the play ends with her at the presentation of Simba and Nala's newborn cub.

Rafiki serves as a supporting character in Timon & Pumbaa, as well as the main character of his own segments called "Rafiki Fables", where his shamanism is expanded. In the episode "Good Mousekeeping", it is revealed that Rafiki can grant wishes and can even take some of the wishes back. In another episode "Rafiki's Apprentice", Rafiki's stick is revealed to have magical powers. He explains to his nephew, Nefu, that the gourds on his stick are the key to his mystical abilities and also reveals through a painting that his stick was given to him by his grandfather when he was a young mandrill. He is also shown to have a collection of sticks which may be selected if the old one gets broken or lost.

Rafiki serves as a recurring character in The Lion Guard. In Mufasa: The Lion King, it is revealed Rafiki was exiled from his group of baboons and monkeys due to being "different" and seeing prophecies. He goes on a journey to Milele, later known as the Pride Lands, to find his long-lost brother. On the journey, he meets Mufasa, Scar, Sarabi and Zazu and joins them.

Rafiki is a meetable character at the Disney Parks and Resorts along with Timon, and can be found in Adventureland and at Disney's Animal Kingdom.

=== Sarabi ===
Sarabi (voiced by Madge Sinclair in The Lion King, Alfre Woodard in the 2019 film, and Tiffany Boone in Mufasa: The Lion King) is Mufasa's wife, the queen of the Pride Lands, and the leader of the pride's hunting party. She is also Simba's mother, Nala's mother-in-law, Scar's sister-in-law and Kopa, Kiara, and Kion's paternal grandmother. Her name means "mirage" in Swahili. In The Lion King, she serves as the Queen of Pride Rock. Years after Scar usurps the throne, Sarabi helps Simba fight against Scar and his spotted hyenas. When Simba defeats Scar, Nala becomes Queen and Sarabi becomes the Queen mother.

In the 2019 film, following Mufasa's death, Scar tries to get Sarabi to be his mate in a levirate marriage, but she turns down his advances.

In Mufasa: The Lion King, it is revealed she was forced to leave her family and home due to a group of white lions called "The Outsiders" taking over the land and attacking them. Her father enlists a hornbill, Zazu, to guide and support her on a journey to find a new home. On the way, she meets Mufasa and Scar (who was at the time named Taka). Although Taka is attracted to her, she falls in love with Mufasa due to his unique smelling ability and his strength.

=== Sarafina ===
Sarafina (voiced by Zoe Leader in The Lion King, Penny Johnson Jerald in the 2019 film, Dominique Jennings in Mufasa: The Lion King) is a lioness who is Nala's mother, Simba's mother-in-law, Kopa, Kiara, and Kion's maternal grandmother, Vitani, Rani, and Kovu's maternal grandmother-in-law and Sarabi's friend. She is first seen sleeping inside Pride Rock with Nala and the rest of the pride. She later cleans Nala before the latter leaves to go to the Elephant Graveyard with Simba. She makes her final appearance mourning the loss of Mufasa and Simba, unaware that Simba is still alive.

== Introduced in The Lion King's Timon & Pumbaa ==
=== Quint ===
Quint (voiced by Corey Burton) is a human who is Timon and Pumbaa's archenemy. He is a sneaky, aggressive, manipulative and sly muscular man with a pinkish-red bulbous nose (which becomes the same color as the rest of his body in most episodes of season three) who has varying roles in the series. Because of the variety of occupations, he also has different first names relating to his jobs and titles, most of which happen to start with "C".

=== Speedy ===
Speedy (voiced by Corey Burton) is a grayish/bluish snail with a shiny red shell and a yellow fedora. Timon and Pumbaa plan to eat him at first, but his ability to speak and sing and his bon viveur, good-humored attitude get him to become friends with them. Timon gives him the name "Speedy" because he thinks that it would be a brilliant incongruity. Speedy frequently finds himself in danger, such as becoming a French gourmet snail by Quint and an earring out of his shell by a married couple, as well as getting captured by a seagull as he returns to his home. In these situations, Speedy is rather helpless and relies on Timon and Pumbaa to save his life.

In "The Man from J.U.N.G.L.E.", Speedy is revealed to be a superhero called Super Duper Hero X after Timon and Pumbaa were captured by Quint. The seagull that has been capturing Speedy also turns out to be an aircraft controlled by Quint. Speedy also makes a non-speaking cameo appearance in the episode "Washington Applesauce".

=== Fred ===
Fred (voiced by S. Scott Bullock) is a meerkat who was Timon's best friend back at the meerkat colony. He is a practical joker, employing such gags as the hand buzzer, the squirting flower and the whoopee cushion. He also loved Timon's hyena jokes. When Fred visits, he pulls more practical jokes on Timon and Pumbaa, such as impersonating Timon's mother or impersonating a Billy Goat guard. Timon and Pumbaa, however, don't find Fred's jokes very funny and they often overpower him. Aside from pulling practical jokes, Fred enjoys doing all sorts of activities, such as playing Turtle Tennis and Fishing for Flamingos. He also mentions that he and Timon have always gone Bowling for Buzzards, a sport which Timon would later share and play with Pumbaa, including the time they found Simba lying in the desert.

At the meerkat colony, Fred's duty was to guard the Duke Meerkat's castle. However, on the day the Duke left the colony, he snuck away to get a snack and convinced Timon that it was now his chance to go on a date with Princess Tatiana, knowing that Timon had a massive crush on her. When the Duke banished Timon from the colony after a cobra infiltrated the colony and kidnapped the princess, Fred's new duty was to guard the back gate, which indicates that he has been demoted for failing to protect the castle.

=== Boss Beaver ===
Boss Beaver (voiced by Brad Garrett) is an ill-tempered and cantankerous beaver. His lifestyle is the exact opposite of Timon and Pumbaa's Hakuna Matata lifestyle: Boss Beaver values hard work whereas Timon and Pumbaa value freedom of rules, responsibilities, and worries. He owns a lumber mill and an amusement park called "Boss Beaver's Log Land". Boss Beaver also has three mottos: "Makuta Hamaka" ("work really hard"), "safety first" and "you break it, you buy it." He also has a son named Boy Beaver (voiced by Mark Schiff), who is shown to be mischievous but also quite malicious behind his father's back, as he damages rides and machines which lead to Timon and Pumbaa nearly getting killed. This could, however, all be due to Boss Beaver's negligence as a parent, as it is implied that he rarely, if ever, spends time with his son.

With his uptight and disciplinary attitude, Boss Beaver is greatly narcissistic, as he seemingly prioritizes his business and reputation over other things. For example, in "Amusement Bark", as he catches his son attempting to hurt Timon and Pumbaa, he is seemingly more concerned that the duo will demand an exorbitant monetary settlement for their injuries. Boss Beaver also emphasizes the importance of safety conditions and is willing to make others pay for violating any safety regulation.

Although he can sometimes be too harsh on his employees, Boss Beaver is willing to promote them if they are good at their jobs and favors, as shown in "Oregon Astray" where he promotes Timon to (temporary) supervising, senior chief executive, governing guides assistant. He is also capable of realizing his mistakes, as he acknowledges his son's malicious nature, to which he is greatly appalled by.

Alongside Speedy, Boss Beaver makes a non-speaking appearance in "Washington Applesauce".

=== Irwin ===
Irwin (voiced by Charlie Adler) is a good-hearted yet accident-prone and clumsy penguin who loves making new friends. Timon and Pumbaa meet and befriend him at a boat stop in Antarctica when they see that he has two extra tickets for the duo to get on the ship. When Irwin leaves his home with the duo, it is shown that he has obviously injured all of the members of his penguin rookery, which is why none of his old friends were willing to join him on the trip. Because of Irwin's clumsiness, Timon tries various attempts to get rid of him, including pretending to play a game of hide-and-seek and a new game called "get lost", though these backfire as they get Irwin to accidentally cause the boat and the island to sink.

In his second appearance, Irwin reunites with Timon and Pumbaa at the Hakuna Matata Megamall, a newly-built shopping mall in the jungle. Due to his accident-prone and clumsy nature, Timon and Pumbaa try to avoid him by hiding in various stores, while Irwin gives chase as he tries to ask them a question, which is if they have seen his car.

=== Toucan Dan ===
Toucan Dan (voiced by Jeff Bennett) is a dangerously clever toucan who is a criminal mastermind. He is a convincing liar and impersonator and would also do anything to get away with his crimes, including getting someone else in trouble. In his debut, "I Don't Bolivia", he keeps tricking Timon into freeing him from his cage. Later in the episode, Timon impersonates Dan to not get in trouble with the police, thus Vulture Police saw him disguising as Dan and then Dan impersonates Timon and this makes Pumbaa have to decide which one is the real Timon. Dan is also shown to know sign language, as he uses it to trick Timon into thinking he is Santa Claus.

Dan makes his second and final appearance in "Alcatraz Mataz", in which he frames Timon for committing a crime of stealing a train car full of beak polish and the police throw him and Pumbaa in prison. In order to clear Timon's name, Timon and Pumbaa escape to catch Dan and make him confess and admit his crime. Later, before long, the Vulture Police showed up and found out the truth. They arrest Dan instead, much to Timon & Pumbaa's relief and their names are officially cleared. However, they still arrest Timon and Pumbaa again for escaping prison when they told them not to, no matter if they were framed or not.

=== Rabbit ===
Rabbit (voiced by Charlie Adler) is a large and tall pink dimwitted and annoying hare. He made his debut "Mojave Desserted". In that episode, Timon and Pumbaa save his life when he was drowning in quicksand and he decides to repay the duo hand and foot. Annoyed by Rabbit, Timon and Pumbaa hatch a plan to put themselves in danger and have Rabbit save them and then leave them alone.

Rabbit makes his second and final appearance in "Africa-Dabra!", this time appearing as an unsympathetic and ruthless magician. After Timon pulls him out of a hat, he teams up with the meerkat to become part of his magic act, telling him that he has been looking for a partner for years. When he gets annoyed by Pumbaa ruining the magic acts, he breaks up Timon and Pumbaa's friendship. When Pumbaa finds out that Timon never truly said anything mean about him, he gets revenge on Rabbit by trapping him in a cage and later skinning him for his disguise.

=== Vulture Police ===
The Vulture Police (voiced by Townsend Coleman and Brian Cummings) are recurring characters in the series. They are a pair of vultures who serve as policemen in both the jungle and any other wildlife-inhabited place. They strongly believe in due process and justice and though they are willing to help victims of a crime, they will not make arrests until the perpetrator is proven guilty, as shown in "Yosemite Remedy" where they initially let a raccoon criminal go since his crime of stealing Timon and Pumbaa's suitcase was not witnessed.

They make their first appearance in "The Law of the Jungle", where they arrest Timon for using the Forbidden Stick to scratch his back and take him to Judge Rhino, who gives several tests to see whether he's innocent or guilty. In their final episode, "Alcatraz Mataz", the Vulture Police throw Timon and Pumbaa into jail. In order to clear their names, Timon and Pumbaa desperately escape in order to get Toucan Dan to confess his crime. When the vulture police arrest Dan after finding out that he's the true criminal, Pumbaa tells Timon that now that his good name has been cleared, he is now free from prison. Unfortunately, the police still later throw Timon and Pumbaa back into jail, and they tell them that even though they are innocent of the crime, they still disobeyed them by escaping when they told them not to, which is a federal offense.

The Vulture Police make a brief appearance in "Wide Awake in Wonderland", appearing in one of the bedtime stories Timon reads to an insomniac Pumbaa.

=== Cheetata and Cheetato ===
Cheetata (voiced by Rob Paulsen) and Cheetato (voiced by Jim Cummings) are a pair of sophisticated twin cheetahs, reminiscent of Shere Khan from the Disney version of The Jungle Book as they are villainous wild cats with deep sinister voices. Although hard to tell apart, aside from their voices, Cheetata appears to be more eager and aggressive while Cheetato seems more likely to think things through.

The cheetahs are shown hunting and intimidating their victims in their unique, haughty style. They are also both masterminds, as they come up with ways to get rid of Shenzi, Banzai, and Ed and also force Timon, who manipulated them into letting him go catch Pumbaa (his true intention being to go find Pumbaa so that they can both escape the cheetahs to safety), to give them his wallet so that they can make sure he actually returns instead of running off like he was planning. But even so, they continuously get outsmarted by Timon and Pumbaa.

=== The Three Natives ===
The Three Natives (both voiced by Jeff Bennett) are a trio of tribes who are really university students taking part in the "Be a Native" weekends. They have a leader (also voiced by Bennett) who is also a university student and usually precedes what he says with "Bungala, bungala." The natives first appear in the pilot episode "Boara Boara", where it is shown that they once served a warthog king and they mistake and treat Pumbaa for said king while making Timon his servant. Everything goes well until they make Pumbaa relight the fire and realize that he's an impostor when they see that he is unable to do so. After Timon and Pumbaa escape, the three natives shed their disguises upon getting tired of the leader's tendency to hit them in the head with his staff and return to the university. The leader orders them to return or else they'll lose their deposit.

Aggressive, hostile and fiercely protective of their tribe, the natives will throw the perpetrator into a volcano if the king is not respected. They are also quite ruthless and greedy, as they steal a gold tooth that belongs to a beast and attempt to kill Pumbaa in order to remove his tusks.

=== Smolder ===
Smolder (voiced by Jim Cummings) is a grizzly bear who has severe anger issues and threatens to harm anyone who gets on his bad side, such as when he is awoken from his nap or when someone gets his food order wrong. His troubles typically come from Timon and Pumbaa, and with his strength, claws, and sharp teeth, he is capable of damaging objects, which he demonstrates as he warns the duo what would happen to them if they do anything to make him angry. Smolder is also willing to fight those who dupe him, as shown in "Jailhouse Shock" where his cellmate, Little Jimmy, takes advantage of his aggressive nature to get even with Timon and Pumbaa.

Although menacing and dangerous, Smolder is genuinely a nice guy, as he shows sympathy for Timon and Pumbaa in the episodes "Ready, Aim, Fire", in which he reveals his name as Smolder (a parody of Smokey Bear) who dislikes fires and saves Timon and Pumbaa from being cooked by Quint, and he develops a friendship with the duo. In "Dapper Duck Burgers", Smolder is also shown to have a guilty pleasure for toys.

=== Tatiana ===
Tatiana (voiced by Tress MacNeille) is the daughter of Duke Meerkat and the princess of the meerkat colony. She only appears in one episode but she's vital for Timon's past. According to Timon, Tatiana loves anyone who is brave, cunning, and resourceful, but Fred tells him that candy, flowers, and a bath are all that is needed to impress her. Tatiana also enjoys painting.

After Timon leaves his guard duty post to prepare for his date with Tatiana, a king cobra enters the colony and kidnaps the princess, which makes everyone believe she's dead and causes Timon to get banished. After Timon and Pumbaa meet for the first time, they see that Tatiana is still alive and rescue her from a cobra. When Tatiana returns to the colony with Timon and Pumbaa, Timon is offered her hand in marriage. When the Duke makes him choose between Tatiana or Pumbaa, he ultimately chooses to be Bestest Best friends with Pumbaa, and as a result, the two get exiled from the meerkat colony.

=== Sharla ===
Sharla (voiced by Billy West) is a female warthog who was voted head hog of Pumbaa's former sounder, as well as Pumbaa's ex-girlfriend. While she only appears in one episode, she is vital for Pumbaa's past. She and three male warthogs of the sounder banished Pumbaa from the group due to his awful scent, which was appalling even by warthog standards.

Years later, as Sharla and the three warthogs are about to migrate for the rainy season with a big bag of bugs, a flock of guineafowl, who are their natural enemies and worst nightmares due to their ability to strip off the flesh of a warthog in ten seconds, surround the sounder camp as they are after the warthogs' supply of grubs. Unable to leave the camp, the warthogs make a distress call, which Pumbaa answers. When Pumbaa reunites with his sounder, he has Timon come up with ideas on how they can get rid of the guineafowl. However, because none of Timon's ideas work, Pumbaa switches the supply of bugs with a supply of firecrackers to fake out the guineafowl while Sharla and the other warthogs migrate with the real bag of bugs.

Being head hog, Sharla is somewhat authoritative and demanding but ultimately serves the needs of her sounder. Although she banished Pumbaa from the group, she continues to have romantic feelings towards him and has never forgotten him. Sharla even offers Pumbaa to become a member of the sounder again, but Pumbaa rejects the idea, as he decides to continue living as a wanderer with Timon and he cannot have the warthogs endure his foul smell forever, to which the female warthog understands.

=== Ned ===
Ned (voiced by Frank Welker) is a high and mighty African bush elephant who is considerably popular in the jungle. Due to his popularity, he looks down upon lowly animals and ridicules Timon and Pumbaa when they fail at proving their worth to him, making fun of and laughing at Pumbaa for trying to be an elephant like him and willing to ruin Timon's reputation. Although selfish and sarcastic, Ned has a change of heart after Pumbaa rescues him and his hippo henchmen from falling off a cliff and offers Pumbaa to join his clique as an honorary elephant, to which Pumbaa rejects.

In "Unlucky in Lesotho", Ned is revealed to run a Good Luck Club, which lost most of its members due to Ned bringing an unlucky jar into the club. Because he gets attacked by piranha upon falling into the river after a black panther cub crosses his path, Ned is never seen or heard from again after this episode, implying that he was devoured by the piranha.

=== Little Jimmy ===
Shifty (voiced by Joe Alaskey), most commonly known as Little Jimmy, is an extremely dangerous bluebird, similar to Toucan Dan in the fact that he is also a deceptive criminal mastermind. He also has two different personas with matching voices: one fake, innocent voice to pass himself off as a cute hatchling and a deeper, criminal one to show that he is truly an adult. In his first appearance, "Nest Best Thing", Little Jimmy tricks Pumbaa into building a birdhouse for him, which is actually a hideout. The pigeon police show up and arrest Little Jimmy.

In "Jailhouse Shock", Little Jimmy is cellmates with Mr. Bear. To get revenge on Timon and Pumbaa for turning him in, he tricks Mr. Bear into thinking that Timon and Pumbaa hurt him so that he could hurt them back. Despite "Little Jimmy" presumably being his fake name, Timon and Pumbaa continue to address him by that name.

=== Gopher ===
Gopher (voiced by Jim Cummings in the first film and Ernie Sabella in Timon & Pumbaa) is a gopher who makes a brief appearance in The Lion King and is expanded in the TV series, albeit with a design change. He serves as Zazu's lieutenant, assisting him in jungle administration as well as reporting underground news.

=== Other characters ===
- Piper (voiced by April Winchell) is a flying squirrel who is on a quest for love, having a romantic interest in a male flying squirrel (voiced by Rob Paulsen).
- Monti (voiced by Quinton Flynn) and Baampu (voiced by Ernie Sabella) are a meerkat and warthog duo who are polar opposites of Timon and Pumbaa. When Timon and Pumbaa set out to find new best friends after their falling out, Pumbaa meets and befriends Monti while Timon meets and befriends Baampu. When Monti and Baampu reunite at a watering hole after years of being separated, they recall many memories before walking away and leaving Timon and Pumbaa to reconcile.
- Pimon (voiced by Billy West) and Tumbaa (voiced by Kevin Michael Richardson) are a buff meerkat and warthog duo who serve as evil counterparts of Timon and Pumbaa, loving to pick on others. They also mockingly create their own philosophy: "Kahuna Potato", which means that they will never leave others alone. They also know kung fu, as shown during their standoff with Timon and Pumbaa, who learned kung fu from Rafiki.
- Uncle Boaris (voiced by Jim Cummings) is a warthog who is Pumbaa's uncle. Having lived in Russia, he was the principal dancer of the Royal Boarshoi ballet until his performances became less and less successful, leading him to decide to give a farewell performance before retiring.
- Uncle Ernie (voiced by Jeff Bennett) is a warthog who is the late uncle of Pumbaa. While Pumbaa's dreams, he appears via clouds and is indicated to be an encouraging mentor to his nephew, as he tells him that he can do anything he puts his mind to but must believe in himself.
- Nefu (voiced by Tahj Mowry, presumably replaced by Dana Hill) is a young rambunctious mandrill who is the nephew of Rafiki. Fascinated by his uncle's mystical abilities, he wishes to be a shaman just like him.
- Rosebud (voiced by Kath Soucie) is a warthog who was put into an arranged marriage with Pumbaa.
- Pumbaa Jr. (voiced by Nancy Cartwright) is an American alligator who hatches from an egg Pumbaa believes he laid, and temporarily becomes the (adoptive) son of Pumbaa and nephew of a reluctant Timon.
- The Duke Meerkat (voiced by Jeff Bennett) is a meerkat who serves as the ruler of Timon's old meerkat colony and is the father of Tatiana.
- The Wonderful Rhino of Laws (voiced by Brad Garrett) is a rhinoceros who serves as the judge of the jungle.
- The jungle inspector (voiced by Tony Jay) is a no-nonsense marabou stork whose duty is to keep things organized and initially fires Zazu for his official tally of the number of animals in the jungle being off-by-one.
- Nobi (voiced by Jim Cummings) is a field mouse who yearns for respect as he gets constantly bullied because of his small size.
- Simon (voiced by Rob Paulsen) is a young circus monkey who initially finds himself to be a terrible circus performer, but his encounter with Shenzi, Banzai, and Ed in the Serengeti helps him improve his acts.
- Ralph (voiced by Rob Paulsen) and Eduardo "Eddie" (voiced by Richard Karron) are a pair of carnivorous snakes who live in the Amazon rainforest, where they build an all-you-can-eat bug buffet to trap Timon and Pumbaa.
- The wolverine (voiced by Pat Fraley) is an aggressive and conniving carnivore who enrolls Timon and Pumbaa in a fitness program under the guise that they would no longer have to worry about being preyed upon by predators, when the real reason he makes them lose weight is that he is a picky eater and likes his meat to be lean and prime.
- The tarsier (voiced by Frank Welker) is a timid and cowardly primate who warns Timon and Pumbaa about a predator being on the loose, telling them that Simba might be said predator. He later turns out to be a disguised carnivorous wolf who has spent months trying to lure Timon and Pumbaa away from Simba.
- The tigress (voiced by April Winchell) is a wisecracking and widowed tiger who has a large family as well as a constant cold. Because of her inability to catch food, as her late husband has been the one to do the hunting, she gets taught how to hunt by Timon and Pumbaa, the former who is reluctant due to her being a predator.
- Claudius is a bloodthirsty lion who lives in the Roman Colosseum. Having defeated other lions in past battles, he is a gladiatorial champion. However, when he is about to fight Simba, he ends up falling asleep due to Timon and Pumbaa keeping him up all night trying to get him to forfeit the battle. His name likely comes from King Claudius from Hamlet, who serves as the inspiration for Scar.
- El Toro (voiced by Corey Burton in "The Pain in Spain", S. Scott Bullock in “The Running of the Bullies”) is a brave yet antagonistic bull who lives in Spain. Once known as the Bravest Bull in All of Spain, he becomes inadequate and out of shape, with his popularity being down and his pay being too high. As a result, he gets fired by Carlos and Consuelo Quint and replaced by Pumbaa (whom the Quints mistook for a wild bull due to his costume and his fast speed). Outraged, El Toro refuses to give up his title without a fight and returns to battle Timon, who acts as a matador in an attempt for himself and Pumbaa to escape.
- Mother Eagle (voiced by Joycee Katz) is a hot-tempered eagle who lives in a nest on Mount Kilimanjaro with her son. She hires Timon and Pumbaa to babysit her son as she flies to the lowlands to gather more food due to Timon stealing her son's bowl of grubs.
  - Baby Earl is an eaglet who is the son of Mother Eagle. Mischievous and naïvely brave, he is desperate to learn how to fly, even if it means jumping off the mountain.
- Boudreaux (voiced by Jim Cummings) is a wise Cajun French-speaking opossum who teaches Timon and Pumbaa to be brave, wise, and true.
- Bruce (voiced by Jim Cummings) is an abusive yet feisty and wisecracking land crab who lives in the Australian Outback. As Timon mistakes him for a giant bug, he tries several attempts to capture him, but Bruce proves to be too clever for Timon. He is also an expert at bug-hunting and forms a friendship with Pumbaa, whom he helped catch some bugs.
- Lester (voiced by Jim Cummings) is an enchanted whale who grants Pumbaa three wishes after the warthog saves his life. After Pumbaa makes his third and final wish, Lester transforms into a human princess and thanks Pumbaa for lifting the curse on him/her.
- Woody Woodeater III (voiced by Jim Cummings) is a feisty termite who is the king of his termite mound. Lost in the jungle, he meets and befriends Timon and Pumbaa, who help him find his way back home while secretly planning on eating him and his subjects when they get there.
- Leopold (voiced by Frank Welker) is a leopard who lives in the jungle, where he rules over a leap of leopards as king.
  - Claudia (voiced by Tara Strong) is a leopard cub who is the daughter of Leopold, the sister of her two unnamed brothers, and the princess of the leopard leap.
- Fronk Fegnugen (voiced by Corey Burton) is a young man who works as the timekeeper of a clock tower in Switzerland.
- Buzz (voiced by Jeff Bennett) is a large bee who is the first class worker of his colony. Like his fellow bees, he has never experienced relaxation until Timon and Pumbaa teach him about "Hakuna Matata".
- Stinky (voiced by Jess Harnell) is a stinkbug who was a drummer in a band with three other bugs, but got kicked out because of his foul smell. After being found by Pumbaa in an icicle, the two become friends as they both have problems with their odor.
- Miss Skunk Lady (voiced by Charlie Adler) is an elderly Southern skunk who helps Pumbaa remove his foul scent, as Pumbaa believes that he can no longer be best friends with Timon because of his smell.
- Mr. Pig (voiced by Keith David) is a self-absorbed pig whom Pumbaa competes against in the "Mister Pig contest", a competition that determines who will win the right to be called "Mr. Pig".
- Dr. Happy (voiced by Steve Mackall), also known as Mr. Happy, is an overzealous biologist who wishes to help poor unfortunate animals. However, despite his good intentions, he forces animals to live in a sanctuary, sometimes against their will. He also creates a 40-foot tall monster named Bartholomew.
  - Happy Dog (also voiced by Mackall) is Dr. Happy's pet dog who serves as his sidekick.
- Jean Farrell (voiced by Valery Pappas) is an animal behavioral scientist who visits the jungle to study wildlife. Fascinated by Pumbaa and later Timon, she is unable to decide which one of them to study, leading to Timon and Pumbaa helping her by pointing out facts about their species.
- Martin Partin (voiced by Rob Paulsen) is a cantankerous and abusive man who visits the Serengeti to host a nature documentary show called Kingdom of the Creatures, feeding his animal stars during filming. He is later replaced by Shenzi, Banzai, and Ed as they take over the show.
- Dr. Cagliostro (voiced by Billy West) is a mad scientist whose goal is to turn animals into beautiful creatures.
  - Torgo (voiced by Maurice LaMarche) is Dr. Cagliostro's fiercely loyal monster assistant. He later turns into a beautiful woman and happily marries Dr. Cagliostro.
- Dr. Screwloose (voiced by John Kassir) is a mad scientist who, after his rudeness angered his high school crush, creates an entire race of rude beings with a piece of Timon's DNA so that he can look polite in comparison.
  - The Mooks are a race of Timon clones created by Dr. Screwloose, designed to be rude and obnoxious. They communicate by only saying the word "mook".

== Introduced in The Lion King II: Simba's Pride ==
=== Kiara ===
Kiara (voiced by Neve Campbell as a young adult and Michelle Horn as a cub in The Lion King II: Simba's Pride with Liz Callaway and Charity Sanoy providing her singing voices; Eden Riegel in The Lion Guard and Blue Ivy Carter as a cub in Mufasa: The Lion King) is Simba and Nala's daughter, Kion's older sister, Mufasa, Sarabi and Sarafina's granddaughter, Scar's great-niece, Kovu's mate, Zira's daughter-in-law and Nuka, Vitani and Rani's sister-in-law. She appears at the end of The Lion King as Simba and Nala become the king and queen of the Pride Lands. She is the protagonist in The Lion King II: Simba's Pride and a recurring character The Lion Guard. As Simba's first cub, Kiara is heir to the Pride Lands.

Kiara is portrayed as a curious, playful, and adventurous princess, much to Simba's worry about her safety. As a young cub, Kiara is reluctant about being queen. She also befriends Kovu when playing at the Outlands where they work together to escape a group of crocodiles. Unfortunately, their friendship is cut short as they are separated by their respective parents. As a young adult, Kiara is rescued by Kovu as part of Zira's plan to avenge Scar's death, but she eventually falls in love with him. When Kovu is exiled from the Pride Lands following Zira's ambush on Simba, Kiara disregards Simba's orders to not leave Pride Rock without an escort while also telling him he would never be Mufasa and leaves to find Kovu. After doing so, returns with him to the Pride Lands to reunite the Pride Landers and Outsiders. Kiara shows wisdom and level headedness as she brings peace to both feuding parties. Kiara then tries get Zira to let go of her hate, but to no avail. Eventually Zira found herself in danger and soon fell to her death after refusing Kiara's help.

In The Lion Guard (which takes place in between the first and second half of The Lion King II: Simba's Pride), Kiara as an older cub has become more accepting to her position as future queen and takes her training more seriously. She and Kion have their fair share of sibling rivalry. Unlike her great-uncle Scar and grandfather Mufasa's sibling rivalry, it does not turn into hatred, as Kiara and Kion resolve their differences and became very close. They also can be seen playing together from time to time. Additionally, unlike her friends Tifu and Zuri, she is more mature, believes there are more important things than appearance, and she is not afraid to get dirty. In the series' final episode "Return to the Pride Lands", which takes place sometime after The Lion King II: Simba's Pride, she and Kovu have become mates and explain to Kion what happened in the Pride Lands whilst he and the Lion Guard were away at the Tree of Life and what had happened to Zira. After learning that Kion had fallen in love with the Tree of Life's young queen Rani, Kiara encourages her brother to return to her. Kiara later witnesses Kion become Rani's mate and the King of the Tree of Life.

Kiara appears in Mufasa: The Lion King, the prequel to the 2019 photorealistic computer-animated remake of the original film. In the film, she is narrated the story of how her grandfather Mufasa becomes the first King of the Pride Lands by Rafiki. At the end, she meets her younger brother, Kion.

=== Kovu ===
Kovu (voiced by Jason Marsden as a young adult, as well as both an older cub and a young adult in The Lion Guard with Gene Miller providing his singing voice in The Lion King II: Simba's Pride and Ryan O'Donohue as a young cub) is Zira's son, Scar's adopted son and chosen heir, Nuka and Vitani's younger brother, and Kiara's mate. His name means "scar" in Swahili. He is shown to be aggressive and crude at first glance. Unlike the other Outsiders, he is open to meeting animals and is more honorable. As a young cub Kovu befriends Kiara, though this did not last long as they are separated by their feuding parents. However, Kovu's newfound friendship with Kiara gives Zira the idea to use their friendship so that Kovu will have the opportunity to kill Simba. Since then, Zira trains Kovu to assassinate Simba and take his place as the king of Pride Rock. During a planned ambush, he rescues Kiara, as part of the ruse, and Simba reluctantly allows him to stay in the Pride Lands. However, as he spends time in the Pride Lands bonding with Kiara, Timon, and Pumbaa, his kind, honorable side returns, and he falls in love with Kiara, dropping his mission. After Nuka dies trying to kill Simba during an ambush, a devastated Zira angrily blames Kovu for Nuka's death and strikes him in the face, scarring his left eye in the process and leaving him with a scar resembling the one that Scar had, before calling him out for betraying the Outsiders and Scar. Kovu stands up to his mother and tells her that he wants nothing to do with Scar and flees back to the Pride Lands. However, Simba, believing that Kovu was involved in the ambush, exiles him from the Pride Lands and has his animal subjects chase him away, as Kiara watches on helplessly. Eventually, after Kovu reunites with Kiara and convinces the Pride Landers and Outsiders to stop fighting each other, Simba forgives Kovu and welcomes him back to Pride Rock as Kiara's mate and future king consort.

In The Lion Guard, Kovu appears with his family in the episode "Lions of the Outlands", which takes place sometime after Kovu's first encounter with Kiara, who plot to take over Jasiri's territory. Kiara's brother Kion learns from Kovu that Kiara knows him. Kovu reappears as a young adult in the series' final episode "Return to the Pride Lands", which takes place sometime after The Lion King II: Simba's Pride, where Kion and the Lion Guard, who had been away from the Pride Lands for several months to go to the Tree of Life, learn that Kovu and the rest of the Outsiders have rejoined Simba's pride following Zira's death. Simba is proud to announce that Kovu and Kiara are his successors. Kovu later witnesses Kion become the mate of the Tree of Life's queen Rani.

=== Outsiders ===
The Outsiders are a pride of offshoot lionesses (the only male lions are Kovu and Nuka) that were loyal to Scar. After a failed takeover following Scar's death, Simba exiled them to the Outlands. In The Lion Guard, they tried to invade the territory that Jasiri's hyena clan lives in. Kion was hesitant to use the Roar of the Elders because of what it did to Scar. After being told by the rest of the Lion Guard that Scar used the Roar for evil, Kion defeated the Outsiders with the Roar of the Elders which sent them flying to the Outlands' termite mound area which became their base of operations. In the series' final episode, "Return to the Pridelands", it is revealed that after the Outsiders rejoined Simba's pride, four of them formed a new Lion Guard with Vitani to protect the Pride Lands whilst Kion's Lion Guard's were travelling to the Tree of Life. At the end of the episode, Vitani's Lion Guard became the Pride Lands' permanent Lion Guard after Kion's Lion Guard decided to step down and stay at The Tree of Life.

==== Zira ====
Zira (voiced by Suzanne Pleshette in The Lion King II: Simba's Pride; Nika Futterman in The Lion Guard), whose name means "hate" in Swahili, is the matriarch of Kovu's family and Scar's most loyal follower, who plots to avenge her superior's death by forming the Outsiders. She takes advantage of Kovu's friendship with Simba's daughter Kiara, as part of her plan to assassinate Simba. When this plan failed due to Kovu's love for Kiara, Zira resorts to an all-out war against Simba's pride. However, because of Kiara and Kovu's actions, Vitani and the other Outsiders realize that they would rather join Simba's pride and turn against Zira who persists in her revenge. Attempting to attack Simba, Zira is intercepted by Kiara and falls into a flash flood to her death, despite Kiara's attempt to rescue her.

Zira makes an appearance in The Lion Guard alongside Kovu, Nuka, Vitani, and the rest of her pride in the episode "Lions of the Outlands", which takes place some time after Kovu first met Kiara. She tries to convince Kiara's brother Kion that using the Roar of the Elders against her and the other Outsiders would cause him to lose it just as Scar did, and to side with his fellow lions. However, Kion is eventually able to see through her deceptions and drives her and the others off with the Roar. In the show's final episode "Return To The Pride Lands", which takes place sometime after the Outsiders rejoined the Pridelanders, Zira's death was mentioned by Kiara and Kovu when the Lion Guard returned and met Vitani's incarnation of the Lion Guard.

Kathleen Turner was originally cast as Zira in The Lion King II: Simba's Pride before being replaced by Pleshette. Turner talked about the role and even sang a portion of her character's song (stating the film would be her singing debut) during an interview on The Rosie O'Donnell Show on March 10, 1998.

==== Nuka ====
Nuka (voiced by Andy Dick) was Zira's eldest child, Vitani and Kovu's older brother and Kiara's brother-in-law. His name means "stink" in Swahili. Jealous of Zira's apparent favoritism for Kovu, Nuka often attempted to gain his mother's attention and approval. During the Outsiders' ambush, Nuka attempts to finally kill Simba himself to prove his worth, but was crushed to death by the falling logs, though he managed to gain the attention he longed for. A heartbroken Zira mourned her son's death and prayed to Scar to "watch over" him. She subsequently accused Kovu of causing Nuka's death, due to not carrying out the plan to kill Simba.

In The Lion Guard episode "Lions Of The Outlands", which takes place some time after Kovu and Kiara first meet, Nuka assists his mother in a plot to take over Jasiri's territory.

==== Vitani ====
Vitani (voiced by Meredith Scott Lynn as a young adult; Lacey Chabert as a cub, as well as both a cub and a young adult in The Lion Guard with Crysta Macalush providing for her cub form's singing voice) is Zira's middle child and only daughter, Nuka and Kovu's sister, and Kiara's sister-in-law. Although she has a prominent appearance in The Lion King II: Simba's Pride, she makes two guest appearances in The Lion Guard. As a young adult, Vitani is Zira's strongest lieutenant, supporting and acting on her mother's violent plans. With Kovu and Kiara's help, Vitani and the Outsiders turn on Zira and join the Pride Landers to settle the feud between the two prides peacefully. After Zira's death, Vitani and the other Outsiders are pardoned by Simba and rejoin his pride.

In The Lion Guard episode "Lions Of The Outlands", which takes place some time after Kovu and Kiara first meet, Vitani assisted her mother in a plot to take over Jasiri's territory. In "Return To The Pride Lands", which takes place some time after the second film, after she and her pride joined Simba's while Kion and his friends were travelling to the Tree of Life, Vitani formed her own Lion Guard in their absence, where it was also mentioned what happened to Zira. As the future king's sister, she believes that it is her responsibility to protect the Pride Lands. She proves herself worthy to become the leader of the Lion Guard after she bravely challenges Kion despite not having the Roar of the Elders, thus revealing her heroic and honorable attributes thereby redeemed from her past villainy. Kion then bestows her the position and power of the leader of the Lion Guard. This allows Vitani to use the Roar of the Elders, and she and her Lion Guard are officially recognized as the new Lion Guard of the Pride Lands whilst Kion and his Guard become the protectors of the Tree of Life.

Her name is a Swahili portmanteau of the words "Vita" ("War"), "Ni" ("I Am"), and "Shetani" ("She-Demon"); the portmanteau can be roughly translated to "I Am War" or "Demon of War". "Shetani" itself was originally her name in early drafts of The Lion King II: Simba's Pride, but this was softened to "Vitani".

== Introduced in The Lion King 1½ ==
=== Ma ===
Ma (voiced by Julie Kavner) is Timon's mother. Generally encouraging and optimistic, she believes in Timon and convinces Uncle Max to give him a job as a sentry or lookout. After Timon fails in his duty, she remains convinced that he can still find a place in the colony, but when he insists that he has to go, Ma supports him. Later, she gets worried about Timon after speaking to Rafiki and searches for him. They finally reunite at Pride Rock and Ma helps in the battle against the hyenas by digging a long tunnel to trap them. After Simba becomes king with the death of Scar, Timon takes them and the entire genus meerkat colony to the jungle paradise which he and Pumbaa discovered. Ma is mentioned several times in Timon & Pumbaa and in The Lion Guard episode "Beware the Zimwi" by Timon, who claims that her cousin's friend knew an ox that was eaten by the Zimwi.

=== Uncle Max ===
Uncle Max (voiced by Jerry Stiller) is a prominent member of the genus meerkat colony and is Timon's uncle and either the brother or brother-in-law of Ma. He has a grey head-fur and a very large nose. Max is a pessimist by nature and very paranoid, believing that a genus meerkat's fate is to be "food for other animals! Feared by nothing and eaten by all!". Max reluctantly agrees to let Timon be a sentry for the colony and attempts to train him for the job, but is nearly eaten by the hyenas when they attack. He is glad to see Timon go but ends up going with Ma to find him. Max appears again towards the end of the film, where he and Ma encounter Timon and Pumbaa at Pride Rock and helps Timon get rid of the hyenas by digging a tunnel. Max finally believes in Timon, and after Timon takes the genus meerkats to his jungle paradise, Max teaches the genus meerkats tai chi.

Originally, Max was not a character during production of The Lion King 1½. However, when the character of Timon's father was cut from the film due to there being too many characters, his role and much of his dialogue were transferred to Max and Ma.

== Introduced in The Lion Guard ==
=== Lion Guard ===
- Kion (voiced by Max Charles and singing voiced provided by Aaron Daniel Jacob in season 3 except for "Battle for the Pride Lands") is the main protagonist of The Lion Guard series, a lion who is Simba and Nala's son, Kiara's younger brother, Rani's mate, Mufasa, Sarabi and Sarafina's grandson, Scar's great-nephew and Baliyo and Kovu's brother-in-law. A short time before or after Kiara's first encounter with Kovu, Kion is born as the second-born child of Simba and Nala. In the series pilot episode "The Lion Guard: Return of the Roar", Simba has Kion organize the titular guard along with Bunga, Beshte, Fuli, and Ono. As the leader of the Lion Guard and second-born to the throne, Kion is gifted with a power called the Roar of the Elders which causes the great lion spirits of the Pride Lands past to roar with him. Kion is kindhearted and has a strong sense of responsibility, and does not want to end up like his great-uncle Scar, who used the Roar for evil and lost its power. He also demonstrates a strong yet open sense of discernment, which warms him to scavengers like Jasiri the hyena, and her clan. By the end of "The Rise of Scar", Kion travels to the Outlands to save Kiara after she is kidnapped by hyenas, and unknowingly summons Scar after he uses the Roar in anger when Janja threatens his family. Later in the season, Kion and the Lion Guard find out that Scar has returned while they are in the Outlands getting volcanic ash needed to cure Simba of a scorpion sting. Upon returning to the Pride Lands, Kion acknowledges to his team that they have a tough fight ahead, but remains confident that they will be able to defeat Scar. At the start of the third season, a now adolescent Kion manages to defeat Scar by summoning the Lions of the Past to destroy him. However, in the process, Ushari, the cobra follower of Scar, attacks Kion, giving him a scar over his left eye. Kion and the Lion Guard then journey to find the Tree of Life to heal him. On the way to the tree, Kion often acts irritable and aggressive and loses control of his Roar due to the venom's effects. After reaching the Tree of Life, Kion meets the protectors of the Tree of Life, the Night Pride, who guide him during his recovery process. While recovering, Kion develops romantic feelings for Rani, the leader of the Night Pride, who later becomes the queen of the Tree of Life. Kion completely masters the Roar under the guidance of the spirit of Askari, leader of the first Lion Guard. Kion and his friends return to the Pride Lands after hearing from Jasiri and Janja that Zira and the Outsiders plan to attack his pride. After arriving in the Pride Lands, Kion learns that Zira has died and the two prides have merged, with Zira's daughter Vitani forming her own Lion Guard in the original group's absence. Kion decides to pass on the role of the Lion Guard and the Roar of the Elders to Vitani and her lionesses, with him and his friends joining the Night Pride. Kion and his friends return to the Tree of Life, where Kion marries Rani. Kion makes a silent cameo appearance at the end of the film, Mufasa: The Lion King.
- Bunga (voiced by Joshua Rush) is a honey badger who is Kion's childhood best friend and the bravest member of the Lion Guard. He is also Timon and Pumbaa's adoptive nephew and Simba's adoptive brother, thus also making him Nala's adoptive brother-in-law and Kiara and Kion's adoptive uncle. Bunga is shown to be very adventurous and he rarely acts serious or even sits still, as he is always on the move, working off boundless energy and enthusiasm, and makes even the direst of situations into a fantastic time. Though this makes him a great friend and playmate, it lands him in trouble more often than not. According to Kiara, Bunga is "brave, bordering on stupid", but a valued member of the Lion Guard nonetheless. In the finale, Bunga joins the Night Pride.His love interest is Binga
- Fuli (voiced by Diamond White) is a king cheetah who is one of Kion's friends and the fastest member of the Lion Guard. She is quite prideful in her running abilities and shows extreme delight for being able to outpace a pursuer of any species. Despite being friends with Kion, she is somewhat resentful of the lions for lording over the Pride Lands, was skeptical about Kion's Roar of the Elders, and hates water, but she was willing to join the Lion Guard with her friends to defend the Circle of Life when Janja and his clan invaded the Pride Lands. She is also the first female animal to ever serve in the Lion Guard, as mentioned in "The Rise of Scar". In season three, Fuli assumes part-time command of the Lion Guard from Kion when his scar affects his rational thinking. In the finale, Fuli joins the Night Pride and falls in love with a cheetah named Azaad.
- Beshte (voiced by Dusan Brown) is a hippopotamus who is one of Kion's friends and the strongest member of the Lion Guard. Being one of the most popular animals of the Pride Lands, Beshte is shown to be kindhearted. His friendliness extends to everyone, as he acts like a big brother to the younger members of his herd, a friend to animals of all different species, and a protector of the Pride Lands at large. Beshte can also, however, be sensitive, being especially tactful when his friend Kion is unable to use the Roar of the Elders. For an animal so large and full of life, Beshte has an appropriately large heart and never fails to treat his friends with kindness. In the finale, Beshte joins the Night Pride.
- Ono (voiced by Atticus Shaffer) is a cattle egret who is one of Kion's friends and the keenest of sight of the Lion Guard, as well as its only non-mammal member before Anga joined. He is one of the more easygoing members of the group, being friendly and group-oriented. He is used to spending time around other animals and is content to be part of the Lion Guard. Ono is also shown to be blunt, as he can lay out his feelings without sugar-coating. He is by far the most realistic member of the group, as he always thinks things through before jumping in. When it comes to his role on the Lion Guard, Ono is brave and has a knack for following the rules. He obeys Kion's orders without question and proves himself to be plucky and thrifty, considerably useful when it comes to scouting out a situation. His principles are clear in his willingness to fight with his full heart for the Circle of Life, and he is a valued member of the Lion Guard for his intelligence and ability to see things from afar. During the final confrontation against Scar, Ono saves Bunga from falling into a volcano, but he is nearly blinded by smog. Ono gives up his position as the keenest of sight to Anga, but remains a member of the Lion Guard after Kion bestows him the new title of the smartest, and joins his friends to find the Tree of Life in hope of curing his eyes. After reaching the Tree of Life, Ono begins his healing process and finally regains his sight. In the finale, Ono joins the Night Pride.
- Anga (voiced by Bryana Salaz) is a martial eagle who first appears in season two's finale "Fire from the Sky", where she teams up with Ono to stop Mzingo's parliament from setting fire to the Pride Lands. She is a no-nonsense bird, giving her the impression that she is cold and unfriendly, but in reality, she is kind and caring, and her cold exterior is just her way of being calm. Like most birds, she admires Hadithi to the point she hardly able to contain her excitement whenever he is involved, making it one of the rare occasions Anga loses her composure. In season three, she becomes a member of the Lion Guard following Ono's injuries during the battle for the Pride Lands, taking up his position as the keenest of sight. In the finale, Anga joins the Night Pride.

=== Night Pride ===
- Rani (speaking voice by Peyton Elizabeth Lee and singing voice by Lana McKissack) is the leader of the Night Pride, a team of Asiatic lions who protect the Tree of Life, and Kion's love interest as well as his mate and current Queen. She is also Simba and Nala's daughter-in-law, Kovu and Kiara's sister-in-law, Bunga's adoptive niece-in-law, Sarafina's maternal granddaughter-in-law, Mufasa and Sarabi's paternal granddaughter-in-law and Scar's paternal niece-in-law. She initially mistook the Lion Guard as intruders after Bunga accidentally causes a landslide and Kion accidentally lost control of his Roar that blew away her younger brother Baliyo, but eventually welcomed them under her grandmother Janna's insistence. Although her trust with the Lion Guard was strained after learning that they were unknowingly followed by Makucha and his allies, she reconciled with them after they have worked together to fight the predators off. Following her grandmother's death, Rani becomes Queen of the Tree of Life, and at the end of the series, she marries Kion as well as ruling the Tree of Life with him. Her name means "Queen" in Hindi.
- Baliyo (voiced by Hudson Yang) is Rani's younger brother, later Kion's brother-in-law and Kiara and Kovu's co-brother-in-law following Kion and Rani's wedding. His name means "Strong" in Nepali and "Powerful" and "Sacrifice" in Hindi (bali).
- Surak (voiced by Lou Diamond Phillips) is Janna's son, and Rani and Baliyo's uncle. He is also Kion's uncle-in-law following Rani's wedding. His name means "Clue" in Hindi and his catchphrase is "Jogina!".
- Nirmala (voiced by Miki Yamashita) is the Night Pride's healer. She is the one who guides Kion in his recovery process. Her name means "Pure" in Hindi.

=== Pride Landers ===
- Zuri (voiced by Madison Pettis) is a lioness cub and one of Kiara's friends. She is very sassy and appears to be vain about her appearance, as she constantly sharpens her claws on trees to keep them shiny. She can be melodramatic in the face of simple circumstances and harbors deep disgust for grubs. She can also be snobbish and entitled at times. She appears as a young adult at Kion's coronation in "Return to the Pride Lands".
- Tiifu (voiced by Sarah Hyland in season one and "The Rise of Scar", Bailey Gambertoglio in season two) is a lioness cub and one of Kiara's friends. Like Zuri, she is vain about her appearance and can be snobby. Despite this, she is sweet and loyal to her friends. She appears as a young adult at Kion's coronation in "Return to the Pride Lands".
- Makini (voiced by Landry Bender) is a young mandrill who is Rafiki's new apprentice. She is free-spirited, loves to learn and look up to her mentor, but she has trouble being calm and is easy to deceive, which was the cause of Scar's resurrection. Despite this, Makini takes pride in herself and her position, and is friendly and welcoming to everyone she meets. She joins the Lion Guard on their journey to the Tree of Life, though she unintentionally reveals its existence to Makucha. Following Queen Janna's death and the wedding between Kion and Rani, Makini becomes Kion and Rani's Royal Mjuzi.
- Makuu (voiced by Blair Underwood) is a young, sleek, and well-built Nile crocodile who leads the crocodile float that lives in the Pride Lands after defeating the previous leader Pua in battle. During season one, he was shown as arrogant and has a tendency to fight others in the Pride Lands. Unlike his predecessor, Makuu initially had no respect for tradition or the Circle of Life and saw making peace as a sign of weakness, but he knows when to back down from combat. By season two, Makuu changed his ways for the better, gaining more respect for tradition and the Circle of Life. He also decided to become a better leader for his float and in time grow to be honorable towards other animals.
- Basi (voiced by Kevin Michael Richardson) is a hippopotamus who is Beshte's father and the leader of their pod. He is amicable and open, willing to engage in conversation and negotiate according to the customs of the Pride Lands. Even in the face of adversity, such as Makuu's violent takeover of Big Springs, Basi maintains his temper and graciously offers the crocodile a chance to return once the fish have returned in plenty. Being so learned in the ways of the animals, Basi is knowledgeable and wise. Despite being an animal with a very different way of life, he understands the customs of the crocodiles and how this affects his pod's everyday life. Unlike the inexperienced young Makuu, Basi grasps an understanding of the Circle of Life and how every animal must give and take to keep it in balance.
- Ma Tembo (voiced by Lynette Dupree) is an African bush elephant with a broken right tusk, who attains leadership of her father Aminifu's herd after his death. Much like her father, she is always game for a laugh. Even when Simba makes a mistake at her father's funeral, she is gracious and kind and makes light of the situation by dwelling on the good. She is similarly gracious to Nala and Kiara when they are the only members of their family to attend the elephant concert. Ma Tembo's herd resided in Kilio Valley until it was destroyed by a fire caused by the Outlanders in "The Kilio Valley Fire".
  - Mtoto (voiced by Natalie Coughlin in "Bunga the Wise", Justin Felbinger in later episodes) is a young African bush elephant calf who idolizes Beshte. He appears to be innocent with little understanding of the world. His playful nature often gets him into trouble, though his intentions are usually good.
  - Mtoto's Mom (voiced by Russi Taylor in "Follow That Hippo!", Virginia Watson in later episodes) is an unnamed African bush elephant who is part of Ma Tembo's herd.
  - Zito (voiced by Nick Watt) is a grouchy and impatient African bush elephant who is part of Ma Tembo's herd.
  - Johari (voiced by Ace Gibson) is an African bush elephant who is part of Ma Tembo's herd.
  - Zigo (voiced by Marieve Herington) is an African bush elephant who is part of Ma Tembo's herd.
- Thurston (voiced by Kevin Schon impersonating Jim Backus) is a dimwitted plains zebra who is the leader of his herd. He prides zebras as the animals who have the best sense of direction in the Pride Lands and most knowledgeable, while in reality, it is the opposite.
- Mbeya (voiced by Howy Parkins) is an old black rhinoceros who is the leader of his crash.
  - Kifaru (voiced by Maurice LaMarche) is a white rhinoceros with poor eyesight. He has a red-billed oxpecker named Mwenzi (voiced by Rhys Darby) as his tickbird and friend. His name means "Rhino" in Swahili. Kifaru is modeled after the late Sudan, the last northern white rhinoceros who resides at Ol Pejeta Conservancy in Laikipia, Kenya.
- Bupu (voiced by Michael Dorn) is a stubborn sable antelope who is the leader of the herd and values polite behavior.
  - Boboka (voiced by Erica Luttrell) is a mother sable antelope who is part of Bupu's herd along with her son.
- Twiga (voiced by Alex Cartañá) is a Masai giraffe who is the leader of the herd.
  - Juhudi (voiced by Ivy Bishop) is a young Masai giraffe calf who is Twiga's daughter.
  - Shingo (voiced by Phil LaMarr) is a Masai giraffe who is part of Twiga's herd.
- Laini (voiced by Meghan Strange) is a galago who is the leader of her group in Ndefu Grove.

=== Outlanders ===
- Janja (voiced by Andrew Kishino) is the cunning and aggressive leader of the hyenas in the Outlands, and the former main antagonist of the series. In the second season, Janja helps Ushari summon Scar's spirit so that he can guide them in defeating the Lion Guard. In "The Hyena Resistance", Jasiri saves Janja from falling into a steam vent and tells him that he and his clan are welcome to join her clan's hyena resistance to defeat Scar. After some hesitation, Janja dismisses her offer, but his hesitation causes Ushari's skinks to question his loyalty and leaves Jasiri hopeful that he will come around eventually. In "Battle for the Pride Lands", Janja reforms following Scar double-crossing the hyenas, and after Scar's destruction and Ushari's death, Janja nominates Jasiri to be in charge of the Outlands, unifying both clans.
  - Cheezi (voiced by Vargus Mason) is a hyena and one of Janja's right-hand henchmen. He is excitable and is usually seen sticking his tongue out.
  - Chungu (voiced by Kevin Schon) is one of Janja's right-hand henchmen. He is an unintelligent hyena who has a tough attitude and a slightly heavier build than the other hyenas.
  - Nne (voiced by Beau Black) is a stout but sly and smart hyena. Janja appointed him and Tano to become Cheezi and Chungu's replacement when he blamed them for the failure in their plan. However, he and Tano eventually ditched Janja as they are proven to be smarter than him and deemed their leader to be too stupid to carry out their plan, which was later foiled by the Lion Guard.
  - Tano (voiced by Dee Bradley Baker) is a sloping but devious and smart hyena. Janja appointed him and Nne to become Cheezi and Chungu's replacement when he blamed them for the failure in their plan. However, he and Nne eventually ditched Janja as they are proven to be smarter than him and deemed their leader to be too stupid to carry out their plan, which was later foiled by the Lion Guard.
- Jasiri (voiced by Maia Mitchell) is a friendly hyena who first appears in "Never Judge a Hyena by its Spots". Unlike most of her species, she is open to making friends with lions. Bold and spunky, Jasiri can look past differences and focus on where different species have common ground. Unlike Janja and his clan, she dislikes selfishness and gluttony, and she respects the Circle of Life. In "The Hyena Resistance", when Jasiri learns from Kion that Scar has returned, she and her clan form a resistance to aid the Lion Guard and help defeat Scar. In the third season, Jasiri accepts Janja and his clan as members of her clan, and after Scar's defeat, she becomes the leader of the Outlands.
  - Madoa (voiced by Maisie Klompus) is a hyena who is Jasiri's sister and is part of her clan.
  - Tunu (voiced by Crimson Hart) is a hyena cub who is Wema's brother and part of Jasiri's clan.
  - Wema (voiced by Fiona Hart) is a hyena cub who is Tunu's sister and part of Jasiri's clan.
- Ushari (voiced by Christian Slater) is an Egyptian cobra who often conflicted with Bunga and would get disturbed whenever the Lion Guard was near him. In "The Rise of Scar", Ushari finally gets fed up with the Lion Guard disturbing his peace and inadvertently finds out that Kion talks to Mufasa's spirit. With this knowledge, he decides to join forces with Janja's clan and ends up helping them orchestrate the events that allow them to summon Scar's spirit so that he can guide them in defeating the Lion Guard. In "Battle for the Pride Lands", Scar plots with Ushari to kill the Lion Guard once and for all, as well as Janja, after overhearing his hesitation on which sides to join. However, the plot fails, Janja betrays Scar, and a battle in the Outlands ensues. In a confrontation between Kion and Scar, Ushari attacks Kion and gives him a scar on his left eye, similar to his great-uncle's. Despite this, Kion manages to defeat Scar by summoning the Great Kings of the Past, who vanquish Scar with rainwater. Ushari, in disbelief and anger, makes one last attempt on Kion's life, but is thwarted by Bunga, and falls to his death in the lava below.
- Mzingo (voiced by Greg Ellis) is the sophisticated leader of a parliament of white-backed vultures. In the second season, Mzingo and his parliament joins Scar to defeat the Lion Guard. Following Scar's defeat, Mzingo accepted Jasiri as the leader of the Outlands.
  - Mwoga (voiced by Cam Clarke) is a foolish and clumsy white-backed vulture who acts as the parliament's spy.
- Reirei (voiced by Ana Gasteyer) is a clever, scheming, and manipulative jackal and the matriarch of her family pack. In the second season, Reirei and her family joins Scar to defeat the Lion Guard. Following Scar's defeat, Reirei accepted Jasiri as the leader of the Outlands.
  - Goigoi (voiced by Phil LaMarr) is Reirei's mate who only thinks with his stomach and has the tendency to fall asleep.
  - Dogo (voiced by Jacob Guenther) is one of Reirei and Goigoi's sons who uses his innocent looks to his advantage to win the trust of others to take advantage of them.
  - Dogo's Siblings (voiced by Jacob Guenther, Khary Payton, and Alex Cartañá) are Reirei and Goigoi's sons and daughter and Dogo's brothers and sister.
  - Kijana (voiced by Amber Hood) is Reirei and Goigoi's daughter.
- Kiburi (voiced by Common) is a Nile crocodile and a former member of Makuu's float. Much like Makuu when he was troublesome, he saw no reason why the crocodiles should have regard for the other animals of the Pride Lands. After the crocodiles were accidentally awakened from dry season aestivation by the Lion Guard, Kiburi led most of the float to seize bodies of water. He later challenged Makuu to a mashindano, having made an alliance with Ushari and a plan to eliminate Simba. Upon being defeated, he and his followers were exiled to the Outlands and joins Scar to defeat the Lion Guard. Following Scar's defeat, Kiburi reluctantly accepted Jasiri as the leader of the Outlands.
  - Tamka (voiced by Nolan North) is a brutish, yet unintelligent Nile crocodile loyal to Kiburi.
  - Nduli (voiced by Jorge Diaz) is an optimistic Nile crocodile loyal to Kiburi.
- Shupavu (voiced by Meghan Strange) is the sneaky leader of a group of skinks who acts as Ushari's spies in the Pride Lands.
  - Njano (voiced by Ford Riley) is a crafty, blue-tongued skink who is Shupavu's second-in-command.
  - Nyeusi (voiced by Dee Bradley Baker) is a stealthy black skink who is a member of the group.

=== Makucha's Army ===
- Makucha (voiced by Steve Blum) is a cunning and powerful leopard who comes to the Pride Lands in pursuit of Ajabu, and proves to be quite an adversary to the Lion Guard due to his speed and strength. He is later revealed to be the leader of his leap, which is first shown when the Lion Guard was looking for water in the Back Lands during a water shortage in the Pride Lands. In the third season, Makucha sneakily follows the Lion Guard to the Tree of Life and attempts to feast on the rare animals that live there while gaining allies along the way. When he does arrive at the Tree of Life, Makucha and his allies are eventually blown away by the Roar of the Elders.
- Mama Binturong (voiced by Rachel House) is a sneaky and arrogant binturong crime boss who lives in a stone forest and enjoys eating tuliza until Bunga ruins her tuliza pile with his stink, causing Mama Binturong to get revenge on him. In "The River of Patience", after Makucha, Chuluun, and Ora were defeated by the Lion Guard and the Night Pride, Mama Binturong joins them to assist in their cause.
- Chuluun (voiced by Kimiko Glenn) is a cunning and sneaky but arrogant snow leopard who the Lion Guard encountered in the mountains during their journey to the Tree of Life. After she was defeated for terrorizing a pack of red pandas, Chuluun joins Makucha to follow the Lion Guard to the Tree of Life.
- Ora (voiced by Andrew Kishino) is a ferocious Komodo dragon who the Lion Guard encountered on Dragon Island during their journey to the Tree of Life. After he and his bank were defeated for attempting to eat Lumba-Lumba, Ora joins Makucha to follow the Lion Guard to the Tree of Life.

=== Other characters ===
- Askari (voiced by Michael Luwoye) is a lion and the leader of the original Lion Guard. His spirit teaches Kion about how the Roar of the Elders works while he was at the Tree of Life.
- Janna (voiced by Shohreh Aghdashloo) is the former queen of the Tree of Life, Surak's mother, and Rani and Baliyo's grandmother. In "Long Live the Queen", she died of old age, and in "Return to the Pride Lands", her spirit is seen with the spirits of Mufasa and Askari when Kion marries Rani with his Lion Guard joining the Night Pride protect the Tree of Life. Her name means "paradise" in Arabic and "life" in Hindi (jann).
- Sãhasí (voiced by James Sie) is Rani and Baliyo's deceased father. His spirit appears with Ãnanda where they advise Rani to listen to Queen Janna's request to allow the Lion Guard into the Tree of Life. As a result of Kion and Rani's union, Sãhasí becomes Kion's father-in-law. His name means "brave" in Hindi.
- Ãnanda (voiced by Grace Young) is Rani and Baliyo's deceased mother. Her spirit appears with Sãhasí where they advise Rani to listen to Queen Janna's request to allow the Lion Guard into the Tree of Life. As a result of Kion and Rani's union, Ãnanda becomes Kion's mother-in-law. Her name means "joy" in Hindi.
- Heng Heng (voiced by Tiffany Espensen) is a giant panda who lives at the Tree of Life.
- Tangaagim (voiced by Rafael Petardi) is a polar bear who lives at the Tree of Life.
- Vuruga Vuruga (voiced by Virginia Watson) a Cape buffalo who is the leader of her herd. Kiara once presided over their Royal Buffalo Wallow.
- Big Baboon (voiced by Ford Riley in "Return of the Roar", Dee Bradley Baker in later appearances) is an olive baboon and leader of his troop.
  - Gumba (voiced by Jacquez Swanigan) is a young olive baboon who is part of Big Baboon's troop.
- Baby Baboon (voiced by Dee Bradley Baker) is an infant cliff baboon who Fuli rescued and returned home.
- Uroho (voiced by David Adkins) is a sneaky yellow baboon who is the leader of the Traveling Baboon Show.
  - Mwevi and Mwizi (both voiced by Dee Bradley Baker) are a duo of yellow baboons who are part of Uroho's Traveling Baboon show.
- Kinyonga (voiced by Meghan Strange) is a veiled chameleon who once helped the Lion Guard by spying on Scar in the Outlands.
- Azaad (voiced by Behzad Dabu) is a prideful Asiatic cheetah that the Lion Guard encountered in his canyon during their journey to the Tree of Life. He later guided them down the fastest route to the Pride Lands where he later meets Simba and Nala. He is also Fuli's love interest. His catchphrase is "Mibinamet!", which is Persian for "See you (later)!"
- Pua (voiced by Gerald C. Rivers) is an elderly Nile crocodile who originally led the crocodile float until he is defeated by Makuu in a "mashindano" battle for the position of alpha male. Upon defeat, Pua leaves the float.
- Flamingo Girls (voiced by Anndi McAfee and Sarah Grace Wright) are two unnamed flamingos that the Lion Guard encountered on their beach during their journey to the Tree of Life.
- Yun Mibu (voiced by Jason Lashea) is a clouded leopard that the Lion Guard encountered in a forest during their journey to the Tree of Life.
- Lumba-Lumba (speaking voice by Tania Gunadi and singing voice by Kimiko Glenn) is a pink Indo-Pacific humpback dolphin that the Lion Guard encountered near Dragon Island during their journey to the Tree of Life.
- Hadithi (voiced by John O'Hurley) is a legendary African hawk-eagle who faked having invented the Hadithi Spin.
- Chama (voiced by Jacob Bertrand) is a young fun-loving African bush elephant who used to be part of Ma Tembo's herd. He, Mzaha, and Furaha are best friends and share a tree near Big Springs.
- Mzaha (voiced by Cade Sutton) is a young fun-loving sable antelope who used to be part of Bupu's herd and is one of Chama's friends.
- Furaha (voiced by Mekai Curtis) is a young fun-loving Zanzibar red colobus who used to be part of Tumbili's troop and is one of Chama's friends. His name means "Happiness" in Swahili.
- Tumbili (voiced by Ace Gibson) is a Zanzibar red colobus and the leader of his troop. His name means "Monkey" in Swahili.
- Kitendo (voiced by Christopher Jackson) is a mandrill who is Makini's father.
- Fikiri (voiced by Heather Headley) is a mandrill who is Makini's mother.
- King Sokwe (voiced by John Rhys-Davies) is an adult eastern lowland gorilla who is the king of the Theluji Mountains and an ally to Simba. He is also a father to two dimwitted princes named Majinuni and Hafifu. His name means "ape" in Swahili.
  - Majinuni and Hafifu (voiced by Daniel Howell and Phil Lester respectively) are two juvenile eastern lowland gorillas and King Sokwe's sons who came to the Pride Lands to deliver a message to Simba. Their names means "buffoon" and "poor, weak and silly talk" in Swahili.
- Shujaa (voiced by Christopher Jackson) is a large adolescent mountain gorilla warrior from the Bwindi Impenetrable Forest who first appeared in "Beshte and the Beast", when he was sent to the Pride Lands by King Sokwe to help the Lion Guard fight and defeat the Outlanders. After defeating the Outlanders, Shujaa also helped put out a wildfire and carried Beshte to safety. His name means "The Hero" or "Warrior" in Swahili.
- Kwato (voiced by Lyons Luke Mathias) is a young plains zebra foal who is part of Thurston's herd.
- Muhimu (voiced by Kari Wahlgren, Emma Bunton in the UK version of "The Mbali Fields Migration") is a plains zebra who is the leader of her herd. She initially did not get along with Bunga after sitting on him by accident, but after Bunga saved her life, she comes to trust Bunga and deems him responsible enough to babysit her son.
  - Hamu (voiced by Lyons Luke Mathias) is a young plains zebra foal who is Muhimu's son. Shortly after being born, he helped the Lion Guard fend off Janja, Cheezi, and Chungu.
- Dhahabu (voiced by Renée Elise Goldsberry) is a golden plains zebra and the queen of a herd of zebras that live in the Back Lands. Dhahabu is modeled after the late Zoe, the golden zebra who resided in Hawaii's Three Ring Ranch.
  - Raha (voiced by Rico Rodriguez) is a plains zebra who is Starehe's brother and part of Dhahabu's herd.
  - Starehe (voiced by Raini Rodriguez) is a plains zebra who is Raha's sister and part of Dhahabu's herd.
- Astuto (voiced by Meghan Strange) is a Darwin's fox who lives at the Tree of Life and the mother of her unnamed kits.
- Cek (voiced by Jeremy Ray Valdez) is an Arabian tahr who lives at the Tree of Life and the leader of his herd.
  - Rama (voiced by Tiffany Espensen) is a member of Cek's herd.
- Tafu (voiced by Christopher Willis) is the leader of a scurry of flying squirrels that the Lion Guard encountered in the mountains during their journey to the Tree of Life. Yuki's snow monkey troop mistook them for birds and were afraid until the Lion Guard cleared things up.
- Mbuni (voiced by Russi Taylor) is a cheerful ostrich who is the leader of her flock.
  - Kambuni (voiced by Mckenna Grace) is a young ostrich chick.
- Tamaa (voiced by CJ Byrnes) is a fork-tailed drongo who can imitate the voice of any animal.
- Kulinda (voiced by Elise Allen) is a hamerkop who leaves her egg in Ono's nest while she builds a new nest that is safe from predators. She considers Ono to be part of her family, due to him taking good care of her baby. She later names her baby Ona, in honor of Ono.
- Nyuni (voiced by Nolan North) is a western yellow wagtail who temporarily becomes an unofficial member of Bupu's herd.
- Swala (voiced by Tunisia Hardison) is a Thomson's gazelle who is the leader of her herd.
- Hodari (voiced by Justin Hires) is an electric blue gecko who dreamed of being in a crocodile float. Makuu made him an honorary member of his float due to his bravery when confronting Kiburi.
- Seisou (voiced by Greg Chun) is a Northern white-cheeked gibbon that the Lion Guard encountered in a forest during their journey to the Tree of Life.
- Yuki (voiced by J. Elaine Marcos) is the leader of a troop of snow monkeys that the Lion Guard encountered in the mountains during their journey to the Tree of Life.
  - Hitashi (voiced by Andrew Kishino) is Yuki's mate and a member of her troop.
  - Kimyo (voiced by Ai-Chan Carrier) is Yuki and Hitashi's daughter and a member of their troop.
  - Nabasu (voiced by Evan Kishiyama) is Yuki and Hitashi's son and a member of their troop.
- Domog (voiced by Clyde Kusatsu) is the leader of a pack of red pandas that the Lion Guard encountered in the mountains during their journey to the Tree of Life.
  - Bogino (voiced by Fiona Riley) is a member of Domog's pack.
  - Dughi (voiced by Matthew Yang King) is a member of Domog's pack.
- Shauku (voiced by Jacob Guenther) is a young banded mongoose pup.
- Pãgala (voiced by Eric Bauza) is the leader of a mob of mongooses that the Lion Guard encountered in a marsh during their journey to the Tree of Life. He dislikes it when anyone other than his mob eats the local snails.
  - Krud'dha (voiced by Nolan North) is a member of Pãgala's mob.
- Bambun (voiced by Matthew Yang King) is a mongoose that the Lion Guard encountered in a forest during their journey to the Tree of Life.
- Mpishi (voiced by Carla Hall) is an African harrier-hawk who leaves her hunting grounds from an unknown land and travels to the Pride Lands looking for a rare meal. She teamed up with Mwoga to target Kulinda's newly hatched chick, only to be driven off by the Lion Guard.
- Muhangus (voiced by Khary Payton) is an aardvark and the leader of his shoal.
- Muhanga (voiced by Russi Taylor) is an aardvark who is Muhangus's mate.
- Masikio (voiced by Dee Bradley Baker) is a Natal red rock hare whose group and sister the Lion Guard saved from mudslides.
- Binga (voiced by Fiona Riley) is a female honey badger who lives at the Tree of Life and befriends Bunga.
- Tupp (voiced by Amir Talai) is a jerboa that the Lion Guard meet in the desert during their journey to the Tree of Life.
- Mjomba (voiced by Charlie Adler) is a grumpy and impatient aardwolf who is the leader of the pack. Like the rest of the pack, he adores termites. His name means "uncle" in Swahili.
- Ogopa (voiced by Marieve Herington) is a bright and cheerful aardwolf. Like the rest of the pack, she adores termites. She is easily frightened and tends to jump to conclusions. She also tends to add afterthoughts after she states her opinion on a subject.
- Haya (voiced by Ogie Banks) is a nervous and shy aardwolf. Like the rest of the pack, he adores termites. Like Ogopa, he tends to add afterthoughts after stating his opinion.
- Kely (voiced by David S. Jung) is a golden bamboo lemur who lives at the Tree of Life and is the leader of his troop.
- Kuchimba (voiced by AJ McLean) is a golden mole who lives underground. He helped Kion, Bunga, Kiara, Tiifu, and Zuri find part of their way back to Pride Rock when they were lost underground, and taught Tiifu that the dark is nothing to be afraid of.
- Ajabu (voiced by Ron Funches) is an okapi who came to the Pride Lands to get away from Makucha and made friends with Beshte. He is at first mistaken as Beshte's imaginary friend by Ono and Bunga due to his constant disappearance. After the Lion Guard drove away Makucha, Simba allows him to live in the Pride Lands.
- Ullu (voiced by Vyvan Pham) is an Indian scops owl who lives at the Tree of Life and acts as the Night Pride's lookout.
- Pinguino (voiced by Jamie Camil) is a macaroni penguin who lives at the Tree of Life and is the leader of his rookery.
- Kenge (voiced by Kristofer Hivju) is an enormous and ferocious rock monitor and an acquaintance of Ushari who will get infuriated when someone calls him "little". His venomous bite induces temporary paralysis to everyone, except Bunga.
- Sumu (voiced by Ford Riley) is a venomous scorpion who was ordered by Scar to sting Simba.
- Varya (voiced by Iris Bahr) is a Siberian tiger who came to seek sanctuary at the Tree of Life to safely raise her cubs. She and her cubs are chased by Makucha, Chuluun, and Ora when they reached the pass, but are fortunately saved by the Lion Guard and the Night Pride. Rani then allows them to live in the Tree of Life.
  - Feliks (voiced by Henry Kaufman), Pasha, and Polina (both voiced by Bluebelle Saraceno) are Varya's three cubs.
- Badili (voiced by Jack McBrayer) is a friendly leopard from Mirihi Forest in the Back Lands who was driven out of his territory by Mapigano until the Lion Guard trained him to have enough courage to drive out Mapigano.
- Mapigano (voiced by Jorge Diaz) is a leopard who attempts to take over Badili's territory until Badili gains confidence through training with the Lion Guard and drives him out.
- Fahari (voiced by Nolan North) is a leopard and a member of Makucha's leap.
- Jiona (voiced by Ace Gibson) is a leopard and a member of Makucha's leap.
- Kiril (voiced by Danny Jacobs) is a Siberian musk deer who lives at the Tree of Life and is the leader of his herd.
- Smun (voiced by James Sie) is a Malayan porcupine who is the leader of his prickle and a servant of Mama Binturong.
- Old Civet (voiced by Matthew Yang King) is an unnamed elderly large Indian civet that the Lion Guard encountered near Dragon Island during their journey to the Tree of Life.
- Tompok (voiced by Johnny Yong Bosch) is a banded palm civet that the Lion Guard encountered in a forest during their journey to the Tree of Life.
- Tenuk (voiced by Yuki Matsuzaki) is a Malayan tapir that the Lion Guard encountered in a forest during their journey to the Tree of Life.
- Chura (voiced by Meghan Strange) is an African common toad.
- Kongwe (voiced by CCH Pounder) is an African spurred tortoise who is the oldest and wisest animal in the Pride Lands.
- Vitani’s Lion Guard is a team of lionesses that Vitani formed to protect the Pride Lands while Kion and his friends were at the Tree of Life. Shortly after Kion and his friends returned home, both Lion Guards had a competition to decide who will protect the Pride Lands, in which Vitani's Guard wins. Besides Vitani, the rest of her Lion Guard consists of:
  - Shabaha (voiced by Fiona Riley) is the bravest member of Vitani's Lion Guard, known for her level of insanity. Janja comments that her fighting style is similar to Bunga, much to his liking, but whereas Bunga's bravery leaves him dimwitted, Shabaha's makes her slightly unhinged: she often laughs maniacally in the midst of a challenge.
  - Kasi (voiced by Savannah Smith) is the fastest member of Vitani's Lion Guard, noted to have Fuli's level of serenity. Though without the advantage of Fuli's cheetah speed, Kasi has more constant stamina, as she is a lion, and agility, in part due to her thin build.
  - Imara (voiced by Rachel Crow) is the strongest member of Vitani's Lion Guard, given her tenacity. With a stocky build, she proves nearly as strong as Beshte, as seen when she can slightly push back Beshte during their first encounter and when they are competing by pushing elephant-topped rocks.
  - Tazama (voiced by Sophie Reynolds) is the keenest of sight in Vitani's Lion Guard, as well as a supportive team player. While not able to fly like Anga or Ono, Tazama is capable of seeing in darkness, something Anga and Ono cannot do, and has some level of Ono's tact, using his rules in the challenges against Anga.

== Introduced in The Lion King books ==
=== Kopa ===
Kopa is the son of Simba and Nala, Mufasa, Sarabi, and Sarafina's grandson, and Scar's grand-nephew appearing in the book series The Lion King: Six New Adventures, and is shown to look a lot like his father as a cub, except with a tuft of hair on top of his head. He debuts in the story A Tale of Two Brothers, which served as a prequel to The Lion King. The books were released before the film's production had finished, and thus, Alex Simmons (Kopa's creator) did not know that Simba and Nala would be given a cub at the end of the film.

=== Ahadi ===
Ahadi is the father of Mufasa and Taka (Scar), the grandfather of Simba, the great-grandfather of Kopa, and the king of the Pride Lands during the events of The Lion King: Six New Adventures story A Tale of Two Brothers. He is shown to look a lot like Mufasa except with darker fur but described as having green eyes and a black mane by the author of the book, making him more similar to Scar.

=== Uru ===
Uru is the mother of Mufasa the grandmother of Simba, the great-grandmother of Kopa, and the queen of the Pride Lands during the events of The Lion King: Six New Adventures story A Tale of Two Brothers. She is absent from the book but is mentioned to have left to search for water to save the kingdom.

=== Mohatu ===
Mohatu (voiced by Avery Brooks on The Lion King: The Brightest Star audiotape) is the King of the Pride Lands during the events of the story The Brightest Star. He is the grandfather of Mufasa and Scar and the great-grandfather of Simba. He went to find water for the animals of the land during a drought and helped the animals get on with each other. When he died, he became a star that was brighter than the others. He is shown to look a lot like a darker furred version of Mufasa, having facial features like Simba's, and was said to have been one of the greatest kings of the Pride Lands. He is succeeded by Ahadi.

=== Ni ===
Ni is a character who appears in The Lion King: Six New Adventures story Nala's Dare. He is a young lion who has left his pride to start his own and travels through the Pride Lands during Scar's reign and saves Nala from hyenas before leaving, after meeting the rest of the Pride Landers.

=== Kula ===
Kula is a character in The Lion King: Six New Adventures story Nala's Dare. She is one of Nala's friends and one of the cubs of the Pride Landers who lived during Scar's reign.

=== Chumvi ===
Chumvi is a character in The Lion King: Six New Adventures story Nala's Dare. He is one of Nala's friends and one of the cubs of the Pride Landers.

=== Joka ===
Joka is a giant African rock python in The Lion King: Six New Adventures story A Snake in the Grass. He is extremely intelligent and can formulate complicated plans in a short amount of time. He has the power to twist his words into whatever he rightly wants and uses hypnotism to lure unsuspecting victims into believing his empty words. The name Joka translates as 'dragon' in the Swahili tongue.

=== Jelani ===
Jelani is Rafiki's lazy cousin in The Lion King: Six New Adventures story Follow the Leader. Despite being considered the leader of his troop, he is unconcerned about the suffering of his subjects, as he is often too concerned about his own welfare to lead them to a new home.

=== Kwaheri ===
Kwaheri is Kopa's monkey friend in The Lion King: Six New Adventures stories Nala's Dare and How True, Zazu? He is social, talkative, and critical to his friends. He often flaunts his talents around Kopa to either spark a reaction or just be a show-off.

=== Boma ===
Boma is a cape buffalo who appears in The Lion King: Six New Adventures stories A Tale of Two Brothers and How True, Zazu?. His grandparents were killed during an attack by ants. He is the leader of the cape buffalo and he is aggressive, controlling, selfish, strong, and short-tempered. He is also somewhat reclusive and gruff, as he does not seem to understand that there is a balance between species and refuses to share the last remaining water-hole during a drought, which can affect the whole of the Pride Lands. It is due to him that Taka got his scar after which he renamed himself Scar. If challenged or insulted he becomes very angry. However, he is mildly cooperative if not insulted or challenged. Taka tries to get Mufasa in trouble by telling him to talk with Boma to share the water-hole. Mufasa tries to reason with him to share the water-hole, but he refuses. Scar then roars and tells him that he must obey or challenge Mufasa. He then chases after Mufasa who is rescued by Rafiki. Rafiki starts to grow tired while running but is picked up by Mufasa who then jumps across a ravine. Boma is unable to make the jumps and falls into it. Mufasa tells him that he does not have to fight but he keeps hurling threats while saying that the other buffaloes can still harm Taka. Taka is then attacked by three buffaloes during which he receives his scar. Ahadi stops this attack with a large herd of animals and has an elephant push Boma out of the ravine.

=== Zuzu ===
Zuzu is Ahadi's majordomo. She only appeared in A Tale of Two Brothers; although she was mentioned in How True, Zazu? It is revealed that she is Zazu's mother. Flirtatious and gossipy, Zuzu is a very maternal bird who never passes up the chance for some juicy gossip, much like her son, Zazu. Her talkative nature and nosy habits often make her a bit of an annoyance to the other animals; however, Ahadi puts her personality to good use to get a better grip on the doings of his kingdom. Zuzu is also known for being loyal and brave, as she was willing to help Rafiki even though she did not fully understand the danger Mufasa was in. It is revealed that she retired and gave Zazu her place as the king's majordomo.

=== King Joe ===
King Joe is a comic book character in The Lion King book A False Ancestor as he is a rogue stranger who lurks in the Pride Lands. He tricked Simba by saying that he was the great-great-great-grandfather of the current king, which is Mufasa. He later saves Simba from a river from nearly getting eaten by an alligator. After he saved Simba, he was never mentioned or seen again. He bears a similar mane and appearance to Nuka.

== Introduced in the Hakuna Matata magazine ==
=== Kataka ===
Kataka is a meerkat who appears in the story called Falling in Love. She is part of a meerkat colony that lives in the same oasis that Timon and Pumbaa reside in.

=== Zak ===
Zak is a zebra who appears in a story called Falling in Love. He resides in the same oasis as Timon and Pumbaa. Timon enlisted Zak to help get Kataka back to her colony.

== Introduced in Mufasa: The Lion King ==
=== Masego's Pride ===
Mufasa (voiced by James Earl Jones in the films, Gary Anthony Williams in The Lion Guard and Aaron Pierre in Mufasa: The Lion King) is the overarching protagonist of The Lion King franchise. He is Scar's older brother, Sarabi's mate, Simba's father, Nala's father-in-law, and Kion and Kiara's paternal grandfather who is introduced as the King of the Pride Lands. The outstanding queen Uru of the Pride Lands alongside the brave King Ahadi are Mufasa's parents. His brother Scar's original name is Askari/Taka. Scar was a nice cub but turned sour when he noticed Mufasa was going to be future king and King Ahadi spent extra time with him to teach him about ruling the lands. The name "Mufasa" has an unknown origin, previously attributed to a fictional language called Manazoto. Mufasa is depicted as a just, wise, and responsible leader, a gentle but firm father, and a strong and fierce protector when sufficiently provoked. In The Lion King, he teaches Simba what a king is supposed to be, and how the king is responsible for protecting and maintaining the delicate balance of the ecosystem, and mediate problems between its creatures. However, Mufasa is killed after being thrown into a blue wildebeest stampede by Scar while rescuing Simba. He returns years later as a spirit in the clouds to encourage an older Simba to return to the Pride Lands and reclaim his rightful throne.

- Masego (voiced by Keith David) is a lion and Mufasa's biological father. He was killed in a flood which lead Mufasa to Obasi's Pride. Mufasa didn't know about this until he reunited with his mother.
- Afia (voiced by Anika Noni Rose) is Masego's mate and Mufasa's biological mother. She is presumed dead during the flood until she is revealed to have survived, while mourning Masego, and being reunited with Mufasa in Milele.

=== Obasi's Pride ===
- Obasi (voiced by Lennie James) is Taka's father, Mufasa's reluctant adoptive father, Eshe's mate, and the leader of his pride. He is initially hostile towards Mufasa due to him being a "stray", which he does not allow in his pride, until he gains some respect for him after Mufasa saves Eshe from two white lions of Kiros's pride. When Mufasa informs him to have someone scout out the location of Kiros' pride, Obasi dispatches Chigaru who confirms Mufasa's claim. Moments after Mufasa and Taka leave the pride, Obasi and his pride are killed by Kiros and the Outsiders offscreen.
- Eshe (voiced by Thandiwe Newton) is a powerful and kind-hearted lioness who resided in the Valley of Kings. She lived with her pride, and Mufasa and Taka, watching the two brothers grow up. She recognised Mufasa as her son even despite he was adoptive. She is later killed offscreen by the Outsiders.
- Chigaru (voiced by Abdul Salis) is a member of Obasi's pride who formerly lived in the Valley of Kings. He condemned Obasi for accepting "stray" Mufasa into his pride. After the Outsiders attacked Mufasa and Eshe, he is sent as a scout to their territory and witnesses them killing one of their own for his failure. Chigaru informs Obasi of his findings. He later gets killed by the outsiders offscreen.

=== Kiros' Pride ===
Kiros' Pride, also known as the Outsiders, is a group of supporting antagonists in the 2024 film Mufasa: The Lion King. Those dangerous white lions, being born in different prides and later banished for fur colour, they wipe out other lions to become the only rulers to start with the young. Because they stalk around with Kiros, his sisters are accompanied by 16 lionesses in the pride minus Kiros, Shaju, and Azibo.

- Kiros (voiced by Mads Mikkelsen) is the formidable leader of the Outsiders. He serves as the main antagonist of the movie. After Mufasa killed his son Shaju in self-defense, Kiros sought vengeance against Mufasa starting will leading his pride into killing Obasi's pride. During the final battle, Kiros scars Taka's left eye who took the blow that was meant for Mufasa. When Mufasa and Kiros fall into the underwater lake, Kiros is killed by a large falling rock that Mufasa avoided.
- Akua and Amara (voiced by Joanna Jones and Folake Olowofoyeku respectively) are Kiros' twin sisters. They help Kiros track down Mufasa and his allies. During the final battle, Akua and Amara are among the lionesses in Kiros' pride that die in an earthquake which causes the formation of the Pride Rock, trying to attack Sarabi and the Milele lions.
- Shaju is Kiros's son. He and Azibo ambushed Eshe and Mufasa while she was teaching him some important lessons. He is accidentally killed by Mufasa upon getting impaled on a sharp log.
- Azibo (voiced by A.J. Beckles) is a former Outsider lion who joined Shaju in ambushing Mufasa and Eshe. He gets killed by the lionesses on Kiros' order because he fled in fright after Shaju was killed by Mufasa.

=== Junia's Troop ===
A group of baboons that live in the Congress of Baboons.

- Junia (voiced by Thuso Mbedu) is a yellow baboon who is Rafiki's friend. She wishes Rafiki good-bye when he sets off on a journey following his exile.
- Inaki (voiced by Maestro Harrell) is a yellow baboon whom Rafiki once healed, but he voted for his exile.
- Mosi (voiced by Derrick L. Macmillon) is a yellow baboon and a member of Junia's troop.
- Zala (voiced by Sylvia Tirix) is a yellow baboon and a member of Junia's troop.

=== Milele animals ===
- Ajarry (voiced by Sheila Atim) is a reticulated giraffe who lived in Milele and the leader of her herd. She greeted Mufasa and later agreed to resist the Outsiders under his command.
- Mobo (voiced by David S. Lee) is a Cape buffalo who lived in Milele. At the beginning, he did not believe in Mufasa's intention to defend Milele. After having listened to his address, he agreed to fight at his side.
