= Lansdown (film) =

2001 film by Tom Zuber

- Directed by: Tom Zuber
- Written by: Tom Zuber
- Starring: Paul Shields
- Release date: 2001
- Language: English

Lansdown is a 2001 dark comedy film written and directed by Tom Zuber. Paul Shields stars as Jake Jorgenson, a criminal defense attorney in the fictional town of Lansdown, New Jersey.

The film won Best First Feature at the Cinequest Film Festival.
