= Chad Marshall (producer) =

American producer and director (born 1971)

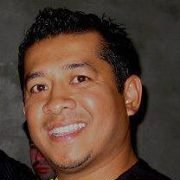
- Born: 15 July 1971 (age 54); Rangoon, Burma
- Occupations: Producer, director, screenwriter
- Years active: 1994–present

Chad Marshall is an American producer and director.

== Biography ==
Marshall started his entertainment career with NBC Entertainment in the summer of 1994 within its finance department, maintaining production budgets for NBC Studios. Later, he became the assistant to the senior vice president who helped create Seinfeld and headed the Late Night and Specials Department for NBC Entertainment.

After leaving NBC in late 1999, Marshall went on to develop original programming at HBO Independent Productions from 1999 to 2000. In the fall of 2001, Marshall helped start KBK Entertainment with Kip Konwiser, where he worked until 2003.

In 2000, Marshall left HBO Independent Productions and started Below The Radar Entertainment. Within its first year, the company had created, sold and produced Suspicion, starring Dean Haglund of The X-Files.

== Filmography ==
Year	Title	Role	Type	Notes
2014	The 6th Dimension	Producer	Feature Film	
2013	Fine Tuned	Creator, Producer & director	Television	
2010	The Desert Maverick	Producer, writer & director	Long-Form Documentary	In conjunction with General Motors and HUMMER
2008	Ditching Party	Producer	Feature Film	
2008	Green with Envy	Writer	Feature Film	Optioned by Christine Peters, Executive Producer of How to Lose a Guy in 10 Days
2008	The Mario Joyner Project	Executive Producer		
2007	Fine Tuned	Creator, Executive Producer & director	Television	
2006	Strange but Law	Producer & director	Television	Pilot
2005	Dallas 362	Co-Producer & Post-Production Supervisor	Feature Film	
2005	OverHaulin'	Producer	Television	Season 3
2005	The Untold Pete Best Story	Executive Producer	Television	Co-Producer with Dick Clark Productions
2004	Little Athens	Producer	Feature Film	
2003	The Jamie Foxx Project	Executive Producer	Television	
2002	The Underground Poets Railroad	Co-Creator & producer	Long-form Documentary	
2000	Suspicion	Executive Producer & director	Television	Starred Dean Haglund
