= Michelle Horn =

American actress

- Born: Michelle Elizabeth Horn; February 28, 1987 (age 39); Pasadena, California, U.S.
- Other name: Michelle Tsaur
- Occupation: Actress
- Years active: 1995–2008; 2016–2021
- Spouse: Johnny Tsaur (m. 2018)
- Children: 1

External image
- Horn in 2004

Michelle Horn (born February 28, 1987) is an American retired actress. She is best known for her voice acting role as young Kiara in The Lion King II: Simba's Pride.

== Career ==
Horn is known for her work in the television shows Strong Medicine and Family Law. Horn is also known for her voiceover work as young Kiara in The Lion King II: Simba's Pride. Her voice can be heard in Lion King-related merchandise such as software, plushes, toys, and video games. Horn costarred with Bruce Willis in the 2005 feature Hostage as Jennifer Smith and appeared on Loving Annabelle as Kristen. Her TV show guest appearances include two episodes of Star Trek: Deep Space Nine ("Tears of the Prophets" and "Penumbra") as Sahgi, a young Bajoran resident of Deep Space Nine, an episode of Without a Trace, "4.0" as Tara Patterson, as well as an episode of Family Guy as the singing voice for Eliza Pinchley. Horn was cast as Sophie in the UK animated television show Dodo in 2021 which also starred Dylan Llewellyn, Mark Watson, Connor Swindells, Kadiff Kirwan, Akiya Henry and Ricky Wilson.

== Filmography ==
- Strong Medicine
- Family Law
- The Lion King II: Simba's Pride (voice)
- Hostage
- Loving Annabelle
- The Coverup
- The Practice
- The Amanda Show
- Stuart Saves His Family
- Chance of a Lifetime
- Profiler
- The Journey of Allen Strange
- A Bug's Life
- The Ruby Princess Runs Away
- Lloyd in Space (voice)
- Fillmore! (voice)
- Family Guy (voice)
- Fillmore! (voice)
- Star Trek: Deep Space Nine
- Without a Trace
- Little Athens
- Walt Disney World Quest: Magical Racing Tour (voice)
- Dodo (voice)

== Personal life ==
On March 1, 2017, Horn became engaged to Johnny Tsaur. On March 3, 2018, they married in a private ceremony at the Castle Green in Pasadena, California. They live in Culver City, California. On August 5, 2023, Horn revealed she was pregnant with their first child. In September 2023, Horn revealed she had given birth to their daughter.
