= Little Athens =

2005 film

- Directed by: Tom Zuber
- Written by: Tom Zuber; Jeff Zuber
- Produced by: Tom Zuber; Larry Romano; Chad Marshall; Josh Lawler
- Starring: John Patrick Amedori; Erica Leerhsen; DJ Qualls; Rachel Miner; Michelle Horn; Michael Peña; Jill Ritchie; Danny Wolske
- Cinematography: Lisa Wiegand
- Edited by: Aaron Toaso; Tom Zuber
- Music by: Barak Moffitt
- Production company: Legaci Pictures
- Distributed by: THINKFilm
- Release dates: June 2005 (CineVegas International Film Festival); November 21, 2006 (DVD)
- Running time: 103 minutes
- Country: United States
- Language: English

Little Athens is a 2005 American independent film directed by Tom Zuber, which stars John Patrick Amedori, Erica Leerhsen, DJ Qualls, Rachel Miner, Eric Szmanda, Michael Peña, and more. Despite premiering at the Toronto International Film Festival in 2005, it was not released on DVD until November 21, 2006.

== Plot ==
Little Athens follows a whirlwind day in the hapless lives of small town youth caught in a dead-end post-high school void. The journeys of four groups of late teens/early twenty-somethings unfold through four different storylines. Their separate trails converge at an explosive house party.

== Cast ==
- John Patrick Amedori as Jimmy
- Erica Leerhsen as Heather
- DJ Qualls as Cory
- Rachel Miner as Allison
- Eric Szmanda as Derek
- Shawn Hatosy as Carter
- Michelle Horn as Emily
- Jorge Garcia as Pedro
- Jill Ritchie as Jessica
- Michael Peña as Carlos
- Danny Wolske as Bobby
- Kenny Morrison as Aaron
- Leonardo Nam as Kwon
- R.J. Knoll as Brad
- Forrest Landis as Kevin
- Esteban Powell as Troy
- Mary-Pat Green as Mrs. Carlson
- Tory Kittles as Sinjin

== Critical reception ==
Mark Bell from Film Threat wrote that "Little Athens spends enough time gradually introducing us to the characters as they are, in their lives, not spending minutes upon minutes on random exposition, and the end result is that, though the characters are numerous and the plotlines varied, you never feel overwhelmed or lost." The reviewer also praised the cast, calling the actors' work "astonishing", and highlighted the acting skills of Erica Leerhsen and DJ Qualls.
