= Grand Jeté (studio) =

Grand-Jeté
Industry	Design, Animation, Post-production
Founded	2003
Headquarters	Hollywood, California
Owner	Howard Nourmand
Website	grand-jete.com

Grand Jeté is a design and production studio specializing in branding consultation, design, film, and motion graphics. The company was founded by Howard Nourmand and is located in the Hollywood Athletic Club in Hollywood, California. The studio has created content for brands and clients including HBO, Brett Ratner, Oliver Stone, Stüssy, Capitol Records, CBS, Lena Dunham, RatPac Entertainment, TBS, Warner Bros, 20th Century Fox, among others. The company has been recognized by AIGA, Art of the Title, Print Magazine, Fast Company and Vice.

== History ==
Founded in 2003 by Howard Nourmand, Grand Jeté has created content for title sequences and film projects including Oliver Stone’s Wall street: Money Never Sleeps and Savages, Brett Ratner’s Tower Heist, the theatrical branding for RatPac Entertainment, and Scott Caan’s The Dog Problem.

In 2011, Grand Jeté created the logo and opening title design for HBO’s hit show Girls. Grand Jeté later went on to design the feminist newsletter Lenny Letter for the Girls creator Lena Dunham and her partner Jenni Konner, as well as their production company shingle.
