= Family Law (American TV series) =

American legal drama TV series (1999–2002)

- Genre: Legal drama
- Created by: Paul Haggis; Anne Kenney
- Starring: Kathleen Quinlan; Julie Warner; Christopher McDonald; Dixie Carter; Cristián de la Fuente; Salli Richardson; Merrilee McCommas; Michelle Horn; David Dorfman; Tony Danza; Orla Brady; Meredith Eaton
- Opening theme: "War" by Edwin Starr and the Brink
- Composers: Jeff Beal; Bruce Roberts; David Tobocman
- Country of origin: United States
- Original language: English
- No. of seasons: 3
- No. of episodes: 68

Production
- Executive producers: Paul Haggis; Stephen Nathan; David Shore
- Producers: Chuck Binder; Dana Maksimovich
- Production companies: Paul Haggis Productions; CBS Productions; Columbia TriStar Television

Original release
- Network: CBS
- Release: September 20, 1999 – May 27, 2002

Family Law is an American legal drama television series, created by Paul Haggis and Anne Kenney, that was produced by Paul Haggis Productions, CBS Productions and Columbia TriStar Television and aired on CBS from September 20, 1999, to May 27, 2002. This series starring Kathleen Quinlan as divorced lawyer Lynn Holt, who attempted to start her own law firm after her husband left both her and their law practice, taking all of their clients with him.

The show also starred Christopher McDonald as opportunistic, ambulance-chasing attorney Rex Weller, Julie Warner as Lynn's friend Danni (and the one member of her former firm's staff who did not defect with Lynn's ex-husband), and Dixie Carter as "pit bull" divorce attorney Randi King. Later cast additions included Tony Danza, Cristián de la Fuente, Salli Richardson, and Meredith Eaton as Emily Resnick, an ambitious attorney hoping to make partner.

Edwin Starr's 1970 hit song, "War" was used as the series' opening title theme, in season one. A cover version of the song was performed by The Brink and used in season two and three.

== Cast ==
- Kathleen Quinlan as Lynn Holt
- Julie Warner as Danni Lipton (seasons 1–2)
- Christopher McDonald as Rex Weller
- Dixie Carter as Randi King
- Cristián de la Fuente as Andres Diaz (seasons 1–2)
- Salli Richardson as Viveca Foster
- Merrilee McCommas as Patricia Dumar
- Michelle Horn as Cassie Holt (Note: Portrayed by Rosemarie Martin in the pilot.)
- David Dorfman as Rupert Holt (Note: Portrayed by Elliott & Jordan Dolling in the pilot. Portrayed by Blake Rossi during season 1.)
- Tony Danza as Joe Celano (seasons 2–3)
- Orla Brady as Naoise O'Neill (season 2–3)
- Meredith Eaton as Emily Resnick (season 3)

== Episodes ==
Season	Episodes	Originally released	
Season	Episodes	First released	Last released
1	23	September 20, 1999	May 8, 2000
2	24	October 2, 2000	May 21, 2001
3	21	September 24, 2001	May 27, 2002

=== Season 1 (1999–2000) ===
No. overall	No. in season	Title	Directed by	Written by	Original release date	Prod. code	Viewers (millions)
1	1	"Pilot"	Paul Haggis	Paul Haggis & Anne Kenney	September 20, 1999	101	15.55
2	2	"Damages"	Paul Haggis	Paul Haggis & David Shore	September 27, 1999	102	15.03
3	3	"All God's Creatures"	Paul Haggis	Stephen Nathan & Paul Haggis	October 4, 1999	103	14.15
4	4	"Prisoners"	Fred Gerber	Anne Kenney	October 11, 1999	104	14.27
5	5	"The List"	Richard J. Lewis	Judith Feldman & Sarah Woodside Gallagher	October 18, 1999	105	13.63
6	6	"The Nanny"	Fred Gerber	Stephen Nathan	October 25, 1999	106	13.99
7	7	"Games"	Perry Lang	David Shore	November 8, 1999	107	12.07
8	8	"The Fourth Trimester"	John Patterson	Thomas L. Moran	November 15, 1999	108	13.30
9	9	"Holt vs. Holt"	Fred Gerber	Anne Kenney	November 22, 1999	109	14.24
10	10	"Four Drops of Blood"	Michael Schultz	Judith Feldman & Sarah Woodside Gallagher	November 29, 1999	110	13.16
11	11	"Decisions"	Adam Nimoy	David Shore & Stephen Nathan	December 13, 1999	111	12.26
12	12	"Media Relations"	Elodie Keene	Gay Walch	January 10, 2000	112	13.09
13	13	"Human Error"	Fred Gerber	Thomas L. Moran	January 17, 2000	113	12.36
14	14	"Stealing Home"	Stephen Nathan	Vivienne Radkoff	January 24, 2000	114	12.14
15	15	"A Mother's Son"	Richard J. Lewis	Anne Kenney & Judith Feldman & Sarah Woodside Gallagher	February 7, 2000	115	11.20
16	16	"Are You My Father?"	Anita Addison	Susan Hamilton Brin	February 21, 2000	116	9.70
17	17	"Metamorphosis"	Fred Gerber	Edmond Stevens	February 28, 2000	117	9.68
18	18	"Necessity"	Ericson Core	Stephen Nathan & David Shore	March 6, 2000	118	11.51
19	19	"Playing God"	Fred Gerber	Tricia Brock & Marc Flanagan	March 20, 2000	119	12.66
20	20	"The Witness"	Kari Skogland	Jeff King	April 17, 2000	120	9.90
21	21	"Second Chance"	Fred Gerber	Bill Chais & David Shore	April 24, 2000	121	11.56
22	22	"Love and Money"	Elodie Keene	Story by : Judith Feldman & Sarah Woodside Gallagher; Teleplay by : Stephen Nathan & David Shore	May 1, 2000	122	13.40
23	23	"Possession Is Nine Tenths of the Law"	Ericson Core	David Shore & Stephen Nathan	May 8, 2000	123	11.71

=== Season 2 (2000–01) ===
No. overall	No. in season	Title	Directed by	Written by	Original release date	Prod. code	Viewers (millions)
24	1	"The Choice"	Paul Haggis	Paul Haggis & Edmond Stevens	October 2, 2000	201	14.08
25	2	"One Mistake"	Fred Gerber	Paul Haggis & David Shore	October 9, 2000	202	11.43
26	3	"Affairs of State"	Fred Gerber	Paul Haggis & Stephen Nathan	October 16, 2000	203	13.31
27	4	"Going Home"	Fred Gerber	Linda McGibney & David Shore	October 23, 2000	204	13.31
28	5	"Telling Lies: Part 1"	Fred Gerber	Paul Haggis & Anne Kenney	October 30, 2000	205	12.73
29	6	"Telling Lies: Part 2"	Jerry Levine	Stephen Nathan & David Shore	November 6, 2000	206	12.69
30	7	"For Love"	Stephen Nathan	Bill Chais & Marjorie David	November 13, 2000	207	13.04
31	8	"Family Values"	Oz Scott	Ashley Gable & Thomas L. Moran	November 20, 2000	208	12.27
32	9	"Echoes"	Martha Mitchell	Jonathan Estrin	November 27, 2000	209	10.89
33	10	"Generations"	Fred Gerber	E.J. Safirstein	December 11, 2000	210	13.40
34	11	"Intentions"	Richard J. Lewis	Linda McGibney & Edmond Stevens	January 8, 2001	211	12.98
35	10	"Film at Eleven"	Ericson Core	Christopher Ambrose & Lawrence Kaplow	January 15, 2001	212	12.00
36	13	"Separation"	Fred Gerber	Stephen Nathan & David Shore	January 29, 2001	213	11.51
37	14	"The Quality of Mercy"	Miles Watkins	Majorie David, Stephen Nathan & David Shore	February 5, 2001	214	12.67
38	15	"Liar's Club: Part 1"	Jeremy Kagan	Ashley Gable & Thomas L. Moran	February 19, 2001	215	11.66
39	16	"Liar's Club: Part 2"	Fred Gerber	Stephen Nathan & David Shore	February 26, 2001	216	10.41
40	17	"Soul Custody"	Oz Scott	Bill Chais & Stephen Nathan	March 12, 2001	217	8.60
41	18	"Safe at Home"	Paul Haggis	Thomas L. Moran & Paul Haggis	March 19, 2001	218	12.80
42	19	"The Gay Divorcee"	Jerry Levine	Stephen Nathan & David Shore	April 9, 2001	219	10.49
43	20	"Bringing Up Babies"	Richard J. Lewis	Linda McGibney & David Shore	April 16, 2001	220	11.11
44	21	"Americans"	Elodie Keene	Stephen Nathan, David Shore & Scott Cameron	April 30, 2001	221	10.52
45	22	"Recovery"	Fred Gerber	Stephen Nathan, David Shore & Jason Preston	May 7, 2001	222	11.02
46	23	"Clemency"	Paul Haggis	Bill Chais, Paul Haggis & Thomas L. Moran	May 14, 2001	223	10.82
47	24	"Planting Seeds"	Elodie Keene	Ashley Gable, Stephen Nathan & David Shore	May 21, 2001	224	11.53

=== Season 3 (2001–02) ===
No. overall	No. in season	Title	Directed by	Written by	Original release date	Prod. code	Viewers (millions)
48	1	"Irreparable Harm"	Fred Gerber	Story by : Paul Haggis & Jan Nash and Lawrence Kaplow; Teleplay by : Lawrence Kaplow and Stephan Nathan & David Shore	September 24, 2001	301	9.48
49	2	"Moving On"	Fred Gerber	Christopher Ambrose & Lawrence Kaplow	October 1, 2001	302	11.36
50	3	"Obligations"	Oz Scott	Ashley Gable	October 8, 2001	303	11.71
51	4	"My Brother's Keeper"	Ericson Core	Story by : Thomas L. Moran & Vivienne Radkoff; Teleplay by : Thomas L. Moran	October 15, 2001	304	10.27
52	5	"Against All Odds"	Fred Gerber	Christopher Ambrose	October 22, 2001	305	10.87
53	6	"Sacrifices"	Oz Scott	Gregg Gettas & Scott Cameron	October 29, 2001	306	12.13
54	7	"All in the Family"	Jerry Levine	Ayanna Floyd	November 5, 2001	307	12.00
55	8	"Security"	Fred Gerber	I.C. Rapoport	November 12, 2001	308	10.54
56	9	"No Options"	Jerry Levine	Lindsay Sturman	November 19, 2001	309	11.78
57	10	"Sex, Lies and the Internet"	Oz Scott	Bill Chais & Thomas L. Moran	December 10, 2001	310	11.01
58	11	"Angel's Flight"	Max Mayer	Paul Haggis & Jan Nash	December 17, 2001	311	11.81
59	12	"Blood and Water"	Max Mayer	Jan Nash	January 7, 2002	312	11.08
60	13	"To Protect and Serve"	Fred Gerber	Ayanna Floyd & Ashley Gable	January 14, 2002	313	11.18
61	14	"Arlene's Choice"	Stephan Nathan	Lawrence Kaplow	February 4, 2002	314	9.84
62	15	"Children of a Lesser Dad"	Oz Scott	Christopher Ambrose	February 25, 2002	315	10.59
63	16	"Celano v. Foster"	Fred Gerber	Bill Chais & Thomas L. Moran	March 4, 2002	316	10.28
64	17	"Big Brother"	Julie Warner	Story by : Stuart Wolpert; Teleplay by : David Shore & Stephen Nathan	March 18, 2002	317	10.00
65	18	"Once Removed"	Oz Scott	Pamela Davis	March 25, 2002	318	10.59
66	19	"Admissions"	Fred Gerber	Lindsay Sturman	April 8, 2002	319	8.78
67	20	"Ties That Bind"	Max Mayer	Ashley Gable & Jan Nash	April 15, 2002	320	9.21
68	21	"Alienation of Affection"	Fred Gerber	Stephan Nathan & David Shore	May 27, 2002	321	9.09

== Release and syndication ==
Since fall 2018, the show has been syndicated on the channel Start TV. Currently it airs Saturdays at 2:00 and 3:00 a.m. EST.

== Reception ==
Ron Wertheimer of the New York Times wrote: "Ms. Quinlan is most appealing, but this series can't survive on her determination alone." Tom Shales of The Washington Post gave it a positive review, "Quinlan is admirable and believable as a woman who won't let setbacks set her back; she's easy to root for."

On Rotten Tomatoes, season one has an approval rating of 10% based on reviews from 10 critics. The site's consensus is "Although Kathleen Quinlan gives a commendable performance, Family Law fizzles out with its bizarre tonal shifts, two-dimensional characterizations, and unbelievable storylines."
