= The Dog Problem =

- Directed by: Scott Caan
- Written by: Scott Caan
- Produced by: Jonah Smith; Palmer West
- Starring: Giovanni Ribisi; Lynn Collins; Scott Caan; Kevin Corrigan; Mena Suvari
- Cinematography: Phil Parmet
- Edited by: Jeffrey M. Werner
- Music by: Mark Mothersbaugh
- Production companies: Dog Problem LLC; Thousand Words
- Distributed by: THINKFilm
- Release date: September 11, 2006 (TIFF)
- Country: United States

The Dog Problem is a 2006 comedy film written and directed by Scott Caan. Along with Caan, the film stars Giovanni Ribisi, Lynn Collins, Kevin Corrigan, Sarah Shahi, and Mena Suvari. Don Cheadle appears in an uncredited role. The film premiered at the 2006 Toronto International Film Festival and was released on DVD on August 28, 2007.

== Plot ==
Solo Harrington is a down-on-his-luck writer who has published an unsuccessful novel and accrued heavy debt on drugs and therapy. After being encouraged by his psychiatrist Dr. Nourmand to get a dog, Solo gets himself a scrawny little terrier, but the dog irritates him to the point that Solo doesn't give it a name. Casper, Solo's womanizing best friend, suggests that Solo sell the dog to Jules, a wealthy dog-lover, in order to pay off Benny, a loan shark who regular threatens Solo.

At a dog park, Solo meets Lola and becomes romantically interested in her. When Lola's pit bull injures Solo's unnamed dog, Solo must take him to the vet, borrowing money from Lola in the process. Solo and Lola's friendship blossoms into the potential for romance, but a series of problems stands in the way of the couple. Solo also starts to form a bond with his dog, which complicates his situation when Jules decides she wants the dog for herself.

== Cast ==
- Giovanni Ribisi as Solo Harrington
- Lynn Collins as Lola
- Scott Caan as Casper
- Kevin Corrigan as Benny
- Mena Suvari as Jules
- Sarah Shahi as Candy
- Tito Ortiz as Frank
- Kimo Leopoldo as Ted
- Brian Goodman as Joe, The Guard
- Joanna Krupa as Taffy
- Med Abrous as Brad
- Melissa Keller as Escalator Girl
- Jimmy the Dog as Spot The Dog
- Don Cheadle as Dr. Nourmand (uncredited)
- Steve Jones as Himself

== Reception ==
The Dog Problem premiered at the 2006 Toronto International Film Festival.

Based on eight critics' reviews on Rotten Tomatoes, The Dog Problem has an approval rating of 63%.

Erik Childress of eFilmCritic.com said the film is, "a romantic comedy which doesn't force its charm down your throat and instead allows the viewer in to peek around its quirks and discover the true heart beating within." David Nusair of Reel Film Reviews called it "a quirky, thoroughly lightweight film that’s generally elevated by several engaging performances and Scott Caan’s confident, almost cocky directorial choices." Eddie Cockrell of Variety wrote the film "is a distinct change of pace [for Caan], reining in the testosterone of 2003's Dallas 362 in favor of a moderately more benevolent worldview," and said "Collins displays an innate understanding of comedic timing", but said it is also "off-puttingly mannered" and the ending appeared to be lifted from the end of 2004's Sideways. In his review for Screen Daily, Patrick Z. McGavin said, "The visual highpoint - a sequence that explains the dog's brief disappearance - reveals a young film-maker whose progress and maturity warrants full consideration."

== Music ==
The film features a score by Mark Mothersbaugh, and the music used during the title sequence is based on the Devo song "Gut Feeling".
