= Suricata major =

Suricata major Temporal range: Early Pleistocene

Scientific classification
- Domain: Eukaryota
- Kingdom: Animalia
- Phylum: Chordata
- Class: Mammalia
- Order: Carnivora
- Suborder: Feliformia
- Family: Herpestidae
- Genus: Suricata
- Species: †S. major

Binomial name
- †Suricata major Hendey, 1974

Extinct species of mongoose

Suricata major is an extinct species of meerkat from the Early Pleistocene of Africa.

== Description ==
Material from this species has been found at the Elandsfontein fossil site in South Africa. Suricata major was larger than the living meerkat, and appears to be intermediate in form between it and Mungos species. Compared to the modern meerkat, its upper cheekteeth were larger and its post-orbital process less well developed.
