= Tom Zuber =

American attorney

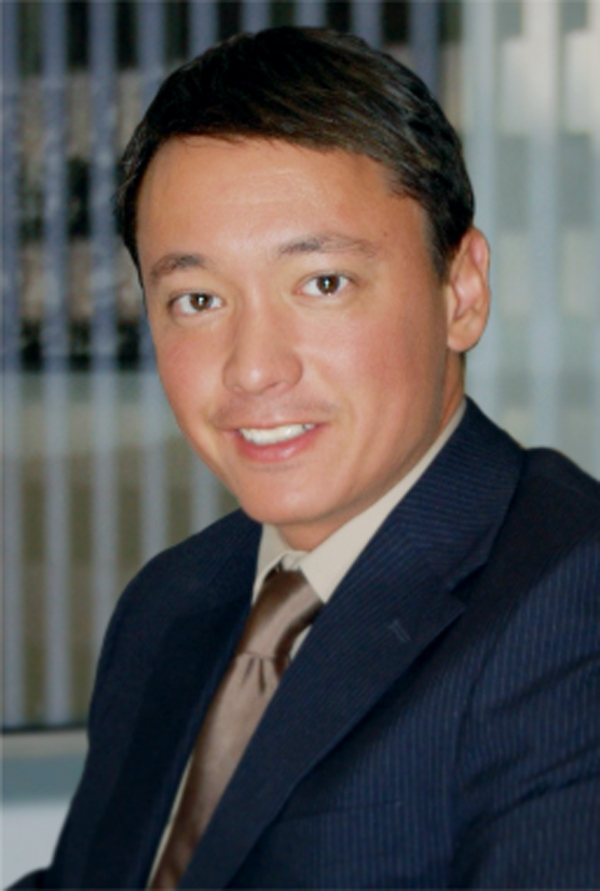
- Education: Harvard University (MPP); Columbia University (JD); Rutgers University (BS)
- Occupations: CEO, LawLoop.com; Co-Founder, Zuber Lawler & Del Duca
- Board member of: Former UNICEF's (Southern California Region) member.

Thomas Francis Zuber (born March 25, 1972) is an American attorney, entrepreneur, and inventor. He is the creator and CEO of LawLoop.com, a cloud computing portal for lawyers, and a Co-Founder and Partner of Zuber Lawler & Del Duca, a bi-coastal law firm headquartered in Los Angeles, California, with additional offices in Chicago, Illinois, New York, New York, Phoenix, Arizona and Silicon Valley, California. He is also known for directing, co-writing, and producing the independent motion picture Little Athens, which was an Official Selection of the 2005 Toronto International Film Festival.

== Life ==
Zuber grew up in Piscataway, New Jersey. He received his M.P.P. from Harvard University, and his J.D. from Columbia Law School, where he was a Harlan Fiske Stone Scholar. He graduated with a B.S. summa cum laude in engineering from Rutgers University. Tom Zuber is admitted to the New York State Bar and the California State Bar.

Zuber began his legal career in the New York office of White & Case in 1999. In 2001, he joined the Los Angeles office of O'Melveny & Myers. Shortly thereafter, Zuber left O'Melveny & Myers to co-found Zuber & Zuber, now Zuber Lawler & Del Duca.

== LawLoop.com ==
Zuber created LawLoop.com, a cloud-computing portal for lawyers, with offices in Los Angeles, California. LawLoop.com uses an online business-network platform to integrate front-and-back office software solutions. LawLoop.com operates completely in the cloud, and includes software application services relating to document management, contact management, client management, and matter management, among other services.

On January 30, 2012, LawLoop.com launched at LegalTech New York 2012. LawLoop.com's launch triggered positive responses from major media outlets such as Los Angeles Business Journal, CNNMoney, Yahoo! Finance, and Corporate Counsel. Following the launch at LegalTech, competing among some 600 start-up companies, LawLoop.com won the start-up competition at IT Expo East 2012, which took place in Miami, Florida.

Zuber's inventions relating to LawLoop.com have resulted in over 10 patents and patents pending. On February 7, 2012, Zuber received his first patent relating to LawLoop.com, U.S. Patent No. 8,112,713 B2, relating to a "Method for Providing Alias Folders in a Document Management System."

== Zuber Lawler & Del Duca ==
With his brother Jeff Zuber, Zuber co-founded Zuber & Zuber, now Zuber Lawler & Del Duca, in 2003 as a 3rd-year associate with no clients, and served as its Managing Partner for the first 7 years of its history. During his tenure, Zuber managed Zuber Lawler & Del Duca's growth from 2 attorneys working out of a Los Angeles domestic kitchen to over 25 attorneys working in 11 different languages representing clients throughout the world from offices in Los Angeles, California; New York, New York; and San Francisco, California.

Zuber Lawler & Del Duca currently represents nine of the Fortune 100 companies, and government entities such as the Federal Deposit Insurance Corporation (FDIC). At the end of 2010, Zuber stepped down as Managing Partner to focus more precisely on client service, attorney recruitment and business development, and to serve as CEO of LawLoop.com. Zuber Lawler & Del Duca is now governed by a Management Committee, on which Zuber serves. He continues to chair Zuber Lawler & Del Duca's Recruiting Committee and Business Development Committee.

== Film ==
In 2005, Zuber directed, co-wrote, and produced the independent motion picture Little Athens, starring Jorge Garcia, Eric Szmanda, and Michael Peña. Made on a shoe-string budget, Little Athens was an Official Selection of the 2005 Toronto International Film Festival.

== Boards ==
Zuber sits on the Regional Board of Directors for Southern California of UNICEF, the world's leading advocate for children.
