= Dallas 362 =

- Directed by: Scott Caan
- Written by: Scott Caan
- Produced by: Kip Konwiser; Beau Flynn; Mary Leigh Hennings; Chad Marshall; Gregory Sabatino
- Starring: Scott Caan; Jeff Goldblum; Shawn Hatosy; Kelly Lynch; Selma Blair
- Distributed by: ThinkFilm
- Release date: June 14, 2003
- Running time: 95 minutes
- Country: United States
- Language: English

Dallas 362 is a 2003 film, starring and directed by Scott Caan. This film was Caan's debut as a director.

The movie won the Critics Award at the 2003 CineVegas International Film Festival in Las Vegas, Nevada.

== Plot ==
Rusty, played by Shawn Hatosy, and Dallas, played by Caan, are best friends, in their mid-20s. Their main source of income is collecting small debts for a local crime boss, Bear (played by Heavy D). Rusty's mother, played by Kelly Lynch, is constantly bailing them out of jail, stitching their cuts, and trying desperately to get them to change their ways, but can't seem to break them out of this destructive pattern. Desperate to help her son, she persuades Rusty to begin sessions with the therapist she is dating, Bob (Jeff Goldblum).

Around the same time that Rusty is making up his mind to go back to Texas to compete in rodeos, Dallas is presented the opportunity to be the driver for "Rubin the Roofer", where there is supposedly $50,000 to be had, of which he will get $20,000. But he has to put $1,000 up front for Rubin, to ensure he doesn't get scared and flee. In the search to collect the $1,000, Dallas attempts to borrow $300 from Christian (played by Val Lauren), one of the men they collect money from for Bear. Christian refuses to loan Dallas the money, so Dallas offers to rob Bear with Christian, telling Christian he knows for a fact that there is $150,000 to be had, as long as he gives him the $300.

Christian ends up overhearing Dallas tell Rusty that he won't go through with the plan with Christian, but will still do the job with Rubin. Christian follows Dallas and Rubin on their robbery job, and it turns out that they are robbing Bear. After Rubin goes inside, Dallas decides to go after him to get the proper share of the $150,000. They end up getting killed trying to rob Bear.

In the end, Rusty goes to Texas, and rodeos like he wanted to. On the bus ride to Texas, Rusty sees a sign that reads "Dallas 362", the title of the film.

== Cast ==
- Scott Caan as Dallas
- Jeff Goldblum as Bob
- Shawn Hatosy as Rusty
- Kelly Lynch as Mary
- Heavy D as "Bear"
- Val Lauren as Christian Potter
