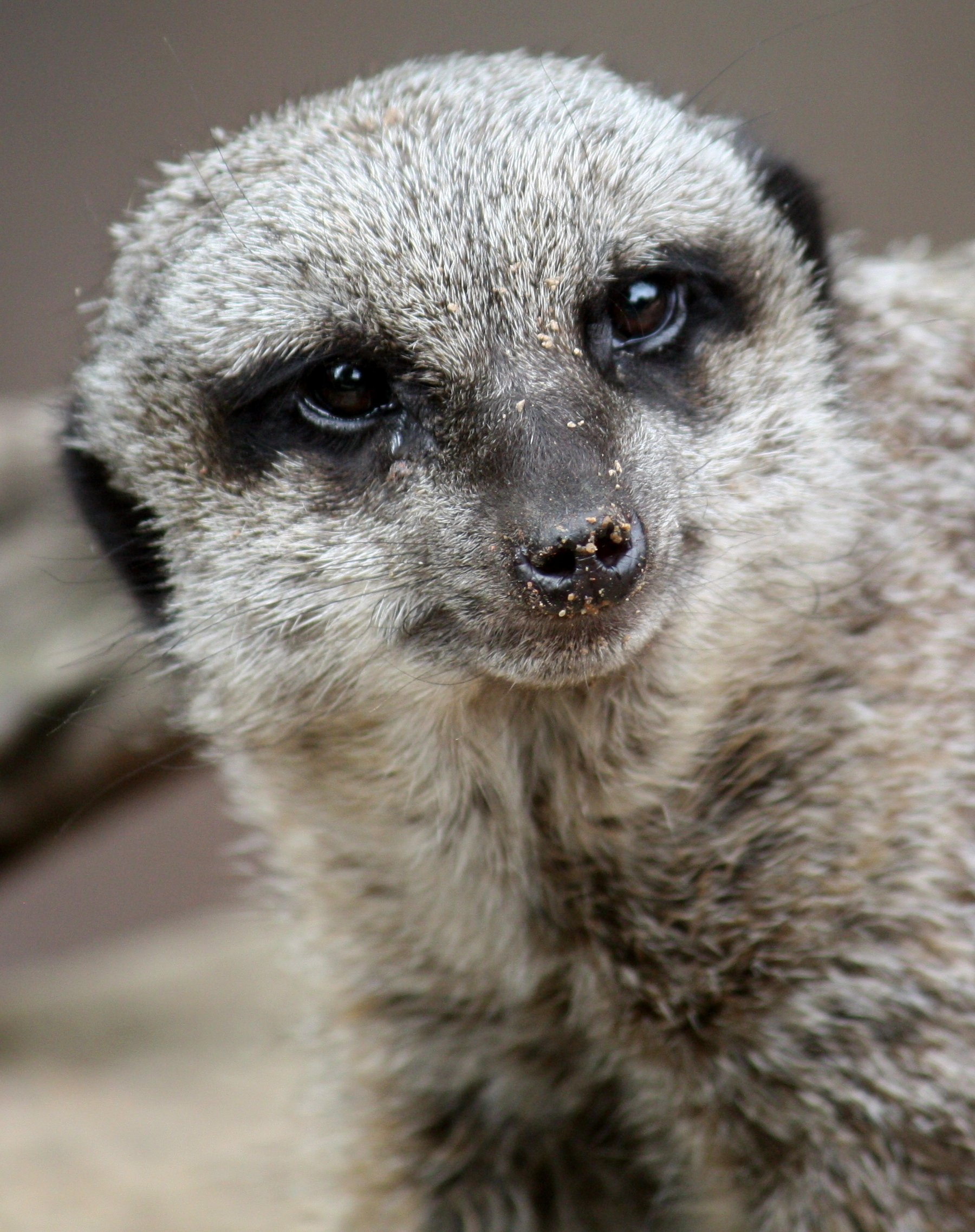
- Meerkat (Suricata suricatta)

Scientific classification
- Kingdom: Animalia
- Phylum: Chordata
- Class: Mammalia
- Order: Carnivora
- Family: Herpestidae
- Subfamily: Mungotinae
- Genus: Suricata; Desmarest, 1804

Type species
- Suricata suricatta Schreber, 1776

Species
- Suricata suricatta - Meerkat; †Suricata major

= Suricata =

Suricata Temporal range: Early Pleistocene - Recent

Genus of mammal

Suricata is a genus of mongoose that is endemic to Africa. The oldest species known is the extinct Suricata major that lived about 1.8 million years ago in South Africa. The only extant species is the meerkat (Suricata suricatta).
