= Kimba the White Lion (TV series) =

Japanese animated television series

- Genre: Anime
- Created by: Osamu Tezuka
- Based on: Kimba the White Lion by Osamu Tezuka
- Directed by: Hayashi Shigeyuki
- Voices of: Yoshiko Ōta; Yoshiko Matsuo; Hajime Akashi; Kinto Tamura; Hisashi Katsusa; Seizo Kato; Kiyoshi Kawabuko; Kazuo Kumakura; Nobuaki Sekine; Yoshiko Yamamoto; Junji Chiba
- Music by: Isao Tomita
- Opening theme: "Jungle Emperor Leo's Theme"
- Country of origin: Japan
- Original language: Japanese
- No. of episodes: 52

Production
- Running time: 23 minutes
- Production company: Mushi Production

Original release
- Network: Fuji TV
- Release: October 6, 1965 – September 28, 1966

Kimba the White Lion, originally known as Jungle Emperor Leo (Japanese: ジャングル大帝, Hepburn: Janguru Taitei) in Japan, is a 1965 television series produced by Mushi Production. This series was based on the manga written and illustrated by Osamu Tezuka. The series was broadcast on Fuji Television and other stations from October 6, 1965, to September 28, 1966; as such, it was the first full-colored Japanese anime broadcast on TV. This series consisted of 52 episodes and won a few awards like Special Award of the 4th TV Editors' Award 1966 and the Cultural Award of Children's Welfare under the Ministry of Health and Welfare 1966. Since its first airing, there have been sequel TV shows, films, and remakes made.

== Plot ==
The series begins in Africa where a group of human hunters begin capturing many of the animals. Among these animals are a lion cub named Kimba (Leo in the Japanese version) and his mother Snowene (Eliza in the Japanese version). Kimba's father Caesar (Panja in the Japanese version), who is the king of the jungle, is killed trying to save Kimba. The ship that captured Kimba and his mother starts to sink and his mother provides Kimba a way to escape and he finds his way back to the jungle. Throughout his journey, Kimba returns to his home in the jungle and becomes a leader of the animals like his father and tries to bring peace between humans and animals. Some of the ways Kimba does this is by adapting human techniques into the animal kingdom such as farming.

== Characters ==
The characters and their voice actors in the original Japanese dub. To see a full list of the English dub voice actors, see List of Kimba the White Lion characters.

- Leo/Kimba: voiced by Yoshiko Ōta
- Lyre: voiced by Yoshiko Matsuo
- Tommy: voiced by Hajime Akashi
- Coco: voiced by Kinto Tamura
- Mandy: voiced by Hisashi Katsusa
- Totto: voiced by Seizo Kato
- Dick: voiced by Kiyoshi Kawabuko
- Bo: voiced by Kazuo Kumakura
- Kenichi: voiced by Nobuaki Sekine
- Mary: voiced by Yoshiko Yamamoto
- Higeoyaji: voiced by Junji Chiba

== International syndication ==
Other than the original broadcast in Japan in 1965, the series has been broadcast in many countries around the world.

In Asia, it was broadcast in Indonesia on Lativi, antv and SCTV (1995–96); in Iran on Channel 1; in the Philippines on ABC 5; in Saudi Arabia on Saudi TV and in Sri Lanka on ART TV.

In Europe, it was broadcast in Bosnia and Herzegovina on RTVUSK; in Croatia on ATV Split/TV Jadran, Nezavisna televizija (NeT), TV Nova Pula and Gradska TV Zadar; in Germany 1977 in ZDF; in France on ORTF (1972) and on TF1; in Italy first in syndication from 1977 and lately on Italia 1 (in 1999 and 2003 with the title Una giungla di avventure per Kimba [literally "a jungle of adventures for Kimba"]) and Boing (2010) and in Spain on TV3.

In North America, it was broadcast in Canada on Knowledge; in Mexico on Boomerang. It was broadcast, with English-dubbed voices, in the United States and other English-speaking markets, beginning on September 11, 1966. It was first commissioned for U.S. development by NBC Enterprises (the original version, now part of CBS Television Distribution) and adapted by Fred Ladd, for syndicated broadcast, with Kimba voiced by Billie Lou Watt. In 2005 the original 1965 dub of Kimba the White Lion was released as an 11-disc DVD set by Madman Anime of Australia and Right Stuf International of the U.S. It was a best seller. The series was re-dubbed into English in 1993, featuring the voice of Yvonne Murray as Kimba and having a new opening, with an all new soundtrack composed by Paul J. Zaza. In 2012 BayView Entertainment/Widowmaker releases "Kimba the White Lion: The Complete Series" 10 DVD box set of the original 1965 series. It was broadcast several times in the United States: on KHJ-TV (1965–67; Billie Lou Watt dub), on NBC (1965–77, re-runs until 1980; Billie Lou Watt dub), on syndication (1965–77; Billie Lou Watt dub; 1993, re-runs until 1995; Yvonne Murray dub), on Kids & Teens TV (1993 re-runs; 2005–2009) and on Inspiration Life TV (1993 re-runs; 2005–2009). The series was (partially) dubbed to Spanish and published in the United States on several cartoon-compilation DVDs by East West DVD Entertainment in the mid-2000s, bearing the titles Kimba y sus amigos, Kimba y sus amigos 2, and Kimba y sus amigos 3. On the DVDs, the episodes were presented alongside other unrelated, Spanish-dubbed cartoons. It is unknown if these DVDs together contain the entirety of the series.

== TV sequel, films, remakes ==
All of the TV and film titles are translations from the Japanese version.

=== New Jungle Emperor, Go Ahead Leo! (1966) ===
This series is a sequel to the original 1965 series where it takes place in the future when Leo is now a full-grown lion. Osamu Tezuka's dream was to create a series that went through all phases of Leo's (Kimba's) life. The episodes follow Leo and his family, Lyre, Rune and Rukkio as they face many different challenges in the jungle.

=== Jungle Emperor Leo (1966) ===
This feature-length film is based on the manga of Jungle Emperor Leo, but the plot is not related or a continuation of the 1965 TV series. It is another retelling of the original story by Osamu Tezuka. This film was awarded the St. Mark's Silver Lion Award at the 19th Venice International Film Festival in 1967.

=== Jungle Emperor Leo (1989) ===
This series is a remake of the 1966 series made by Tezuka Productions. It aired on the TV Tokyo Network from October 11, 1989, to October 12, 1990, and was made up of 52 episodes similar to the original series. Much like the 1965 series, this series focused on the early life of Kimba (Leo).

=== Jungle Emperor Leo (1997) ===
Released on August 1, 1997, the feature film Jungle Emperor Leo follows a similar story line to the original manga and goes through Leo's life. The notable difference in this retelling compared to the previous anime is that the 1997 film features the original ending that Osamu Tezuka intended for Leo. While the 1966 sequel TV series features a happy ending to accommodate the younger audiences, this film ends with Leo's sacrifice in order to bring peace to all life.

=== Jungle Emperor Leo: The Brave Changes the Future (2009) ===
A remake of the original Television series. This series follows a new story line set in the future of 20XX, where there is an artificial jungle created by man. In this artificial jungle, a lion cub named Leo is born and grows up in this environment. This TV series is meant to be a retelling of Jungle Emperor Leo for a newer generation.

== Claims of resemblance to The Lion King ==
In 1994, Walt Disney Pictures released an animated feature-length film, The Lion King. Soon after its release, news circulated of the visual similarities that the film had with Kimba the White Lion. Some similarities included the plot point of a lion cub's father's tragic death, an evil lion with a scar under their eye (though in Kimba, the evil Claw is not related to Kimba), and a baboon as a sage. Although many other plot points like human interaction in Kimba the White Lion differ from The Lion King's absence of humans, there were several design similarities. The Lion King's director Rob Minkoff claimed that he was unaware of the television series and also acknowledged these similarities and believed that within the elements of telling stories in Africa, there are bound to be similarities between all of these. Moreover, this controversy has garnered huge media attention. For example, it was referenced in a 1996 episode of The Simpsons entitled "'Round Springfield". In this episode, Lisa looks into the clouds where Mufasa from The Lion King appears and says to her "You must avenge my death, Kimba, I mean Simba," referencing the similarities between the two works. Matthew Broderick, the voice actor for the adult Simba, recalled in an interview back in 1994 that he once believed that he was cast in a project about Kimba, bringing up memories of watching the series as a child.

In 2019, Walt Disney Pictures released a CGI remake of their film The Lion King, which resurfaced the controversy between Kimba the White Lion and The Lion King. When the Disney remake was released, an article by The Washington Post discussed the copyright issues between the remake and Kimba the White Lion. The Tezuka Family and director of Tezuka Productions claims that copyright laws are slightly different in Japan and therefore, The Lion King is not viewed as infringing copyright. They both viewed that the two works featured similarities in broad elements about nature, and copyrighting facts would not be possible. Furthermore, Billy Tringali states that it is common for Japanese writers to take inspiration from each other; however, as a result, the controversy in the American production of The Lion King lies in the lack of acknowledgment or similarities.
