= List of fictional ungulates in animation =

This list of fictional ungulates in animation is subsidiary to the list of fictional animals and is sorted by species. The list is restricted to notable ungulate (hooved) characters from various animated works. This list includes deer, moose, bovids, giraffes, camels, donkeys, and zebras, but excludes fictional horses, fictional pigs, and fictional pachyderms as each has its own list.

Name	Species	Origin	Notes
Alexa Mongello	Giraffe	Summer Camp Island	Lem's 12-year-old older sister who is athletic and active. She likes sports very much.
Alpacacino	Alpaca	One Piece	
Angus	Highland Cattle	Ferdinand	One of the bulls from Casa Del Toro who has trouble seeing and has a Scottish accent.
Annabelle	Cattle	Annabelle's Wish	A young calf who gains the ability to speak and fly.
Appa	Sky Bison	Avatar: The Last Airbender	Aang's pet Sky Bison.
Archie Everhardt	Indian rhinoceros	GOAT	A roarball player and single father of two daughters.
Baba Looey	Donkey	The Quick Draw McGraw Show	
Baku	Tapir	Onegai My Melody	A purple tapir and Kuromi's sidekick with the ability to fly.
Bambi	White-tailed deer	Bambi	The film's title character and protagonist.
Beshte	Hippo	The Lion Guard	
Black Sheep	Sheep	Cow and Chicken	Cow and Chicken's other cousin. He is the black sheep of the family. He is in fact extremely kind and cultured, but people accuse him of misdemeanors anyway, because he is a black sheep. Like Boneless Chicken and Cousin Sow, it is unknown which side of the family he is related to.
Bob	Buffalo	The New Adventures of Kimba The White Lion	
Boss Rhino	Rhinoceros	Kimba the White Lion	
Charlotte Carson	Red Deer	BoJack Horseman	A former friend of Bojack, she moved to New Mexico.
Chief Bogo	Cape Buffalo	Zootopia	The chief of the Zootopia Police Department, he protects and serves the animal kingdom.
Clam	Rhinoceros	Camp Lazlo	In the show
Bones	Cattle	Ferdinand	One of the bulls who used to pick on Ferdinand as a calf.
Bridget	Giraffe	The Wild	Female Reticulated giraffe
Bucky	Gazelle	The New Adventures of Kimba The White Lion	
Bucky Oryx-Antlerson	Kudu	Zootopia	Judy Hopps's grumpy and crazy kudu neighbor.
Bullwinkle	Moose	The Rocky and Bullwinkle Show	
Chad	Moose	Hey Duggee	One of the members of the Hummingbirds, whose body design resembles Tag.
Chou	Deer mix Boar	Kamichu!	
Clarabelle Cow	Cattle	Disney's Mickey Mouse universe of characters	Clarabelle Cow is a Disney fictional character within the Mickey Mouse universe of characters. Clarabelle Cow was created by Walt Disney and Ub Iwerks in 1928. Clarabelle is one of Minnie Mouse's best friends and is usually depicted as the girlfriend of Horace Horsecollar, although she has also been paired with Goofy occasionally.
Clarice	Reindeer	Rudolph the Red-Nosed Reindeer	A doe who is Rudolph's girlfriend.
Cow	Cattle	Cow and Chicken	Chicken's 7-year-old sister. She is usually depicted with low intelligence and childlike naivety, and is often blind to her brother's disdain and carelessness for her. However, she is better-liked by her peers and has achieved a wide array of accomplishments throughout the course of the series, such as being crowned a beauty pageant queen.
Cow	Cattle	Almost Naked Animals	A Minor Character in the series. he appears in crowds, alone or in a random scene.
The Cow	Cattle	Mighty Mouse: The New Adventures	Mighty Mouse's frequent nemesis who often plots to put dairy supply out of commission.
Cranston	Goat	Cats Don't Dance	A cranky elderly goat who surprisingly loves to dance.
Darius	Yak	Sing 2	A self-centered dance partner for Meena.
Dawn Bellwether	Sheep	Zootopia	She is the former and convicted assistant mayor of the titular city.
Deer	Deer	Nichijou	Has a "wrestling match" to the death with the principal but lost.
Don Valetino	Goat	Cuticle Detective Inaba	
Donkey	Donkey	Shrek	Shrek's first friend and partner in his adventures.
Dorothy	Cattle	Clifford's Really Big Movie	Dorothy is a cow who is friends with Clifford and is the only female in Shackleford's group.
Ellie	Moose	Work It Out Wombats!	An athletic and kind-hearted moose who is an emergency medical technician.
Elliot, Ian and Giselle	Deer	Open Season	Elliot is a hyperactive, dull-witted and albeit clever mule deer and is goods friend with Boog Giselle is a doe deer.
Emperor Kuzco	Llama	The Emperor's New Groove	Emperor Kuzco transformed into a llama.
Fawn Deer	Deer	Bonkers	Romantic interest to title character.
Ferdinand	Cattle	Ferdinand the Bull and Ferdinand	Peaceful and an underdog bull who is also Nina's companion and likes to smell flowers.
Flavio and Marita	Hippopotamus	Animaniacs	Known as "the Hip Hippos", a wealthy, Spanish hippo couple obsessed with being trendy. Sometimes they have been in dangerous situations, but usually remain unaware of it and rarely suffer harm, mainly due to their large frames.
Fleetwood Yak	Yak	Rock Dog	Khampa's yak friend who lives in Snow Mountain voiced by Sam Elliott.
Gabi	Goat	Doki	
Gazelle	Gazelle	Zootopia	Zootopia's popstar voiced by Shakira
Gentle Heart Lamb	Sheep	Care Bears	A Care Bear Cousin. She is mint-green and her tummy symbol is a pink, lace-trimmed, heart-shaped pillow.
Georgina	Giraffe	64 Zoo Lane	A giraffe who lives near Lucy's house and tells bedtime stories to her.
Georgina	Sheep	Sheeep	The bossy leader of the three sheep.
Gertie	Goat	64 Zoo Lane	A Goat who lives in Asia with Bao Bao, Cassandra and Horace.
Giraffe	Giraffe	Revue Starlight	A mysterious talking giraffe who is in charge of the underground revues that the main cast participates in. He also appears in the mobile game connected to anime, Revue Starlight: Re LIVE.
Gloria	Hippo	Madagascar	A hippo, she acts as an older sister to the gang, often putting her foot down when the boys start to lose control.
Gommorah	Zebra	One Piece	
Gompers	Goat	Gravity Falls	
Guapo	Cattle	Ferdinand	One of the bulls from Casa Del Toro.
Hallie	Hippopotamus	Doc McStuffins	A stuffed purple hippopotamus who is Doc's assistant as a nurse.
Heffer Wolfe	Cattle	Rocko's Modern Life	A gluttonous steer
Hippopotamus, White Rhinoceros, Malayan Tapir	Hippopotamus, White Rhinoceros, Malayan Tapir	Kemono Friends	Friends who first appeared in the original Kemono Friends mobile game and later appeared in various other Kemono Friends media including the 2017 anime.
Hipster	Hippopotamus	Wild Kratts	Known as "Hipster Opotamus", is a male hippopotamus calf. Named by Martin Kratt, he made his first appearance in "Race for the Hippo Disc".
Hoppopotamus	Hippopotamus-rabbit hybrid	The Wuzzles	
Mr. Hornbill	Rhinoceros	My Gym Partner's a Monkey	
Hyacinth	Hippopotamus	Fantasia	A ballet dancing hippo who leads other dancing hippos and tries to avoid Ben Ali Gator.
Ingrid	Giraffe	My Gym Partner's a Monkey	
Jacchus	Donkey	Fantasia	The pet donkey of Bacchus
Kabae	Hippopotamus	Aggretsuko	A hippopotamus character who is the coworker of the main character Retsuko.
Kai	Cattle	Kung Fu Panda 3	An evil spirit who steals chi from defeated kung fu masters. He used to be a dear friend of Grand Master Oogway until Oogway banished Kai to the spirit realm to stop his power-lust.
Kapi	Okapi	The New Adventures of Kimba The White Lion	
Kapi Mother	Okapi	The New Adventures of Kimba The White Lion	
Katie	Yak	Horton Hears a Who!	A baby yak who is one of Horton's students.
Kazar	Wildebeest	The Wild	The film's main antagonist who desires to be at the top of the food chain.
Khumba	Zebra	Khumba	The main protagonist of the movie, Khumba. A half-striped zebra who is determined to earn his stripes. He meets true eccentric friends along the way, Mama V and Bradley.
Lammy	Sheep	Happy Tree Friends	A schizophrenic sheep.
Lem Mongello	Giraffe	Summer Camp Island	Alexa's 5-year-old younger sister
Lenny Williams	Giraffe	GOAT	A roarball player and rapper.
Little Strongheart	American Bison	My Little Pony: Friendship Is Magic	A young female buffalo who appears in the episode "Over a Barrel".
Louis	Red Deer	Beastars	He is a red deer who is running candidate for the fictional title of "Beastar"
Lulu	Rhinoceros	Ni Hao, Kai-Lan	A rhinoceros with balloon flying.
Lumpy	Moose	Happy Tree Friends	He is a light blue moose with a very low I.Q., bad teeth (although they are clear white), distorted eyes and mismatched antlers (they always change directions). Known to be the big brother, or perhaps the babysitter of many of the other characters in the cartoon.
Lupe	Goat	Ferdinand	A wisecracking goat who is the coach of Casa Del Torto and one of his closest friend and Nina's companion.
Madame Gazelle	Gazelle	Peppa Pig	The playgroup teacher. She has a French accent(which is a pun on "mademoiselle") and has light blue eyeshadow. She also plays guitar and sings the Bing Bong song with Peppa and her friends in several episodes.
Maggie, Mrs Calloway, and Grace	Cattle	Home on the Range	Three main protagonists.
Mama V	Wildebeest	Khumba	A true friend of Khumba and Bradley.
Maquina	Belted Galloway	Ferdinand	A cloned Belted Galloway bull who is unvoiced in the film.
Marsha Moffet	Moose	Paws & Tales	
Marty the Zebra	Zebra	Madagascar	
Mei-tan	Sheep	Etotama	#8 Eto-Shin
Melman	Giraffe	Madagascar	
Milt	Hippopotamus	Camp Lazlo	A blue hippopotamus who is Larrison's friend and a background character of the series.
Mime	Deer	Happy Tree Friends	A purple male deer who wears face makeup and a navy blue or dark purple and white, striped shirt. He never speaks, because he is a mime, causing others to have a hard time understanding him.
Miniroba	Donkey	Tokyo Marble Chocolate	
Miss Deer Teacher	Deer	Kiff	
Molly	Hippo	64 Zoo Lane	
Montgomery	Moose	The Get Along Gang	The leader of the Get Along Gang. He is very well-rounded and excels in athletics, while tinkering in electronics and science.
Moo-tato	Cattle	Etotama	#2 Eto-Shin
Moose A. Moose	Moose	Noggin	an animated mascot, for the television station Noggin and later the Nick Jr. Channel voiced by Paul Christie.
Moto Moto	Hippo	Madagascar: Escape 2 Africa	A muscular hippo who likes Gloria for being huge.
Mr. Mammoth	Rhinoceros	The Raccoons	
Nessa	Giraffe	My Big Big Friend	A pink giraffe who is Lili's Big Big Friend.
Nestor	Donkey	Nestor the Long-Eared Christmas Donkey	Stop motion animation about a misfit donkey.
Nina	Giraffe	Camp Lazlo	
Nubs	Black rhinoceros	Wild Kratts	A baby black rhino that the Kratts found crying after the rhino stampede was gone. Martin took him to the Tortuga, but he had a contact with a tracking device chip that Zach gave him to lead him to the Tortuga to destroy the Kratts and the crew. They escape and Zach fell in mud. In the end, Nubs returned to his mother.
Nurse Gazelle	Gazelle	My Gym Partner's a Monkey	
Otis, Daisy, Abby, Bessy, and Ben	Cattle	Back at the Barnyard	Main characters.
Ottie	Zebra	Hey Duggee	A zebra that is one of the Hummingbirds, whose body resembles Roly.
Pedro	Reindeer	Itsudatte My Santa!	
Peter Moosebridge	Moose	Zootopia	A news anchor for the Zootopia News Network, he is voiced by Peter Mansbridge
Peter Potamus	Hippo	Peter Potamus	Big, purple, and friendly. Uses his Hippo Hurricane Holler technique to blow away his opponents.
Pronk Oryx-Antlerson	Oryx	Zootopia	Judy Hopps's grumpy and crazy oryx neighbor.
Pyotr	Giraffe	School Rumble	
Quincy Goatee	Goat	Littlest Pet Shop: A World of Our Own	Quincy Goatee is Trip's best friend and roommate. He is an easily frightened fainting goat who faints easily.
Ramona	Sheep	Summer Camp Island	Susie's elderly friend who lives in between time.
Ramurin Makiba	Sheep	Shima Shima Tora no Shimajirou	One of the four main characters. She is a tomboyish sheep who loves drawing.
Romuald	Reindeer	Romuald the Reindeer	
Roro	Antelope	The New Adventures of Kimba The White Lion	
Rocksteady	Mutant human	Teenage Mutant Ninja Turtles	A member of the Foot Clan who was mutated into an anthropomorphic rhinoceros.
Rogon	Rhinoceros	Legends of Chima	The Prince of the Rhino tribe.
Roy the Rhino	Rhinoceros	The Penguins of Madagascar	
Roly	Hippo	Hey Duggee	
Rudolph the Red-Nosed Reindeer	Reindeer	Rudolph the Red-Nosed Reindeer	The main character of the TV special.
Rudy	Ram	Happy Tree Friends	Description as written by his creator: Rudy returns and this time is disguised as one of the characters in video games more fight known in the world (Ryu)...
Rutt and Tuke	Moose	Brother Bear	voiced by Rick Moranis and Dave Thomas respectively, in imitation of their SCTV characters Bob and Doug McKenzie.
Scoutmaster Lumpus	Moose	Camp Lazlo	
Scrubby	Goat	Robinson Crusoe/The Wild Life	An elderly goat with an astigmatism. He and the other animals support Robinson Crusoe after he is marooned on their island.
Shaun Timmy Shirley Timmy's Mother	Sheep	Shaun the Sheep Timmy Time	Shaun is a clever sheep and keeps his head. He has a good friendship with Bitzer. Timmy is a lamb, who is the youngest in the group, and has his own spin-off series. Shirley is the biggest member of the group, and has a high metabolism, her fur can be used as a spot for storing things.
Sheep	Sheep	Sheep in the Big City	Owned by Farmer John, who named him sheep because "when he was born, he looked just like a sheep." Sheep has a hard time with life—between getting chased by the military and trying to see Swanky the Poodle, the poodle that Sheep loves, without getting bonked on the head by Lady Richington with her stainless steel wig.
Sheep	Domestic sheep	WordWorld	A female sheep that is made up of the word "Sheep"
Souffle	Goat	Twelve Warrior Explosive Eto Rangers	Cool goat that can automatically detect any metallic materials in the area.
Sprint	Deer	Enchantimals	Danessa Deer's pet.
Surgeon Sally	Hippopotamus	Hilltop Hospital	
Sven	Reindeer	Frozen	Kristoff's sidekick.
Tag	Rhinoceros	Hey Duggee	
Tasha	Hippopotamus	The Backyardigans	
Tillie	Hippopotamus	Cats Don't Dance	A happy-go-lucky hippopotamus who tries to find the best in every situation. She is a hilarious hippopotamus as hinted out by her giggling and snorting, and by how quickly she introduces many people (and fellow animals).
Tony Tony Chopper	Reindeer	One Piece	A reindeer pirate who is part of the Straw Hat Pirates. He previously ate the Human-Human Fruit, which allows him to transform into a human or a humanoid reindeer.
Toro	Cattle	Looney Tunes	Makes his debut in the Looney Tunes short Bully for Bugs and Bugs fights him in a bull ring tournament.
Tyrone	Moose	The Backyardigans	A good-natured, red-haired, orange moose who is one of the five lead characters of the Nick Jr / Nelvana animated series.
Commander Vachir	Javan rhinoceros	Kung Fu Panda	A chief of security at Chorh-Gom Prison and the leader of Anvil of Heaven, a one-thousand strong army of elite battle rhinos.
Valiente	Cattle	Ferdinand	An arrogant bull from Casa Del Toro who used to pick on other bulls especially Ferdinand. After the fight with Ferdinand, he lost one of his horns and later makes amends with Ferdinand.
White Deer	Deer	Koi☆Sento	
Wilbur	Cattle	Wilbur	
Will Harris	Goat	GOAT	A young goat who aspires to be a roarball champion.
Yakkity Yak	Yak	Yakkity Yak	
Yax	Yak	Zootopia	A laid back Yak, He is voiced by Tommy Chong
Yona	Yak	My Little Pony: Friendship Is Magic	A friendly and clumsy yak who is a student at the School of Friendship.
Zecora	Zebra	My Little Pony: Friendship Is Magic	Friend of the ponies who dabbles in herbal medicine and speaks in rhyme.
Zigzag	Zebra	Wild Kratts	A zebra foal that Chris and Martin Kratt named.
