= List of Kimba the White Lion characters =

The following is a list of characters from Kimba the White Lion.

== Characters ==
Leo (レオ, Reo) / Kimba
Voiced by (Japanese): Yoshiko Ōta (1965 anime), Takashi Toyama (Go Ahead Leo!), Megumi Hayashibara (1989 anime, cub), Shinnosuke Furumoto (1989 anime, adult), Masane Tsukayama (1997 movie), Taeko Kawata (2009 TV movie)
Voiced by (English): Billie Lou Watt (1965 anime), Enzo Caputo (Go Ahead Leo!), Yvonne Murray (1965 anime redub), Brad Swaile (1989 anime), Dan Green (1997 movie)
A white lion and the protagonist of the story who, in the original manga, is followed from birth to death. He believes that there would be peace between animals and humans if each understood the other. In the 1997 movie, the lion leads Dr. Moustache and his assistant to Mt. Moon, and he sacrifices himself by falling on Dr. Moustache's kris so that Dr. Moustache will have food and shelter from the cold. In the 2009 TV movie, Leo has poor hunting skills and is acrophobic, always leaping straight up instead of across gaps. In his attack on the facility, he manages to conquer his fear of heights.
Panja (パンジャ, Panja) / Caesar
Voiced by (Japanese): Asao Koike (1965 anime), Isao Sasaki (1989 anime), Saburō Tokitō (2009 TV movie)
Voiced by (English): Ray Owens (1965 anime)
A white masai lion, Leo's father, and Emperor of the Jungle. He is killed by Ham Egg while trying to rescue his wife and queen. His skin is in his son Leo's lair and under his care. Leo uses his hide as an attraction for a festival in episode 24. He was Specklerex's rival, and (according to High Priestess Leona) Bubu's most hated archenemy, as the one-eyed lion always tried to defile the shrine. He appears in certain episodes in flashbacks, and his head is seen on the full moon in Episode 22 when he gives Leo the strength to find the medicine to save Pop Wooly. In the 2009 movie, he dies protecting his family from hunters.
Eliza (エライザ, Eraiza) / Snowene
Voiced by (Japanese): Noriko Shindo (1965 anime), Nanako Matsushima (2009 TV movie)
Voiced by (English): Billie Lou Watt (1965 anime)
Leo's mother, used as bait by Ham Egg and Kutter. While on the ship, she gives birth to Leo and urges him to escape due to the tropical storm; she is then drowned. She plays a very important role in the 2009 TV movie, in parts like quelling an argument between Leo and Kenichi, and even partaking an assault on the cloning facility; unlike in the previous versions, she does not perish in the 2009 movie.
Leona (リョーナ, Ryōna)
Voiced by (Japanese): Sumi Shimamoto (1989 anime)
Voice by (English): Billie Lou Watt (1966), Kathleen Barr (1989)
Leo's older sister whose task is to guard a small shrine and its chapel, which has many skins of white lions. In the 1989 remake, she was Leo's aunt, shares the same white color as he (minus the black tips), and something of a foster mother to Laiya, and also served as the High Priestess of a small abbey; many men and women revere her to the point of hand feeding her fresh meat cuts. As High Priestess, its Leona's job to ensure that everyone in the abbey heeds her orders and her terms, especially when one of the abbesses attempted to knock her out with a tranquilizer gun.
Laiya (ライヤ, Raiya) / Kitty
Voiced by (Japanese): Keiko Matsuo (1965 anime), Haruko Kitahama (Go Ahead Leo!), Sakiko Tamagawa (1989 anime), Chieko Baisho (1997 movie)
Voiced by (English): Sonia Owens (1965 anime), Kelly Sheridan (1989 anime), Veronica Taylor (1997 movie)
A lioness who would later be Leo's mate and bear him a son and daughter. She is the niece of the old lion named Specklerex and lives with him after her parents are slain by hunters. She notices things that Leo sometimes overlooks. She is always there when Leo needs advice, a "better nature" to calm him down in anger, a shoulder to cry on, or a warrior at his side. In the 1989 remake, she served as a disciple and foster daughter of High Priestess Leona, as her order was to find a type of flower known as a 'starflower'. In the movie, Laiya falls victim to the speckled fever and slowly dies.
Lune (ルネ, Rune)
Voiced by (Japanese): Kyoko Satomi (Go Ahead Leo!), Mifuyu Hiragi (1997 movie)
Voiced by (English): Jose Alvarez (Go Ahead Leo!), Tara Sands (1997 movie)
Leo and Laiya's son. He resembles Leo when he was a cub. He prefers to help his father out in dangerous quests (such as relocating a large horde of elephants, defending the last heroes of a tribe of warriors from corrupted leopard spearmen, and even reclaiming Panja's hide from bandits). He and Lukio made their rise to the spotlight in Episode 5, where his struggles begin in fear and end with new-found valiance. He is, according to one of the giraffes in Episode 15, headstrong, though Leo counters that the cub makes the right choice of friends. Episode 21 shows that he was tricked by an overweight hyena named Agura. He has a very strong dislike of Bizo, for a good reason. Lune always strives to do right things and good deeds, as seen in Episode 9. In the tenth episode, he and Lukio befriend a lycon named Rick.
Lukio (ルッキオ, Rukkio)
Voiced by (Japanese): Eiko Masuyama (Go Ahead Leo!), Hekiru Shiina (1997 movie)
Voiced by (English): Elizabeth Williams (1997 movie)
Leo and Laiya's daughter. She resembles Laiya when she was a cub. Episode 6 of the anime is when she truly gives her all to protect a herd of gorillas from an army of mandrills long enough for Leo to give her a hand. In the tenth episode, she and Lune befriend an African wild dog named Rick.
Tommy (トミー, Tomī) / Bucky
Voiced by (Japanese): Hajime Akashi (1965 anime), Sukekiyo Kameyama (1989 anime), Naoki Tatsuta (1997 movie)
Voiced by (English): Ray Owens (1965 anime), Michael Sinterniklaas (1997 movie)
A gazelle that always gets into mischief. He almost always seen wearing a straw hat, which Leo had used to appoint him Secretary of the Jungle Economy. He is known as "Tony" (トニー, Tonī) in the 1989 series.
Coco (ココ, Koko) / Pauly Cracker
Voiced by (Japanese): Kinto Tamura (1965 anime), Shigeru Chiba (1989 anime), Kaneta Kimotsuki (1997 movie), Rie Kugimiya (2009 TV movie)
Voiced by (English): Gilbert Mack (1965 anime), David Wills (1997 movie)
A green parrot who spent some time living with humans and believes that he should be put in charge of mentoring Leo. While still a close friend, Coco is made female for the 2009 TV movie.
Burazza (ブラッザー, Burazzā) / Dan'l Baboon
Voiced by (Japanese): Hisashi Katsuta (1965 anime), Kei Tani (1997 movie)
Voiced by (English): Ray Owens (1965 anime), Kayzie Rogers (1997 movie)
A wise mandrill who is Leo's mentor. His name was changed to "Mandy" (マンディ, Mandi) for the original anime series, but changed back in the 1997 movie.
Bongo (ボンゴ, Bongo) / Speedy Cheetah
A cheetah who is one of Leo's cubhood friends.
Keruru (ケルル, Keruru)
Voiced by (Japanese): Mayumi Tanaka (1989 anime)
Amuji (アムジ, Amuji)
Voiced by (Japanese): Yō Inoue
Pagura (パグラ, Pagura) / Kelly Phunt
Voiced by (Japanese): Masatō Ibu (1997 movie)
Voiced by (English): David Brimmer (1997 movie)
A stubborn African bush elephant who never trusts humans or human culture - however, he does praise Kimba (Leo) for the cub's beliefs. In episode 44, Pagoola gives Kimba a trail: bypass his defenses and he shall rescue Kenichi. As usual, he praises the cub, letting him and his friends pass.
Bubu (ブブ, Bubu) / Claw / Jamar
Voiced by (Japanese): Tesshō Genda
A one-eyed lion who wants Leo and his family dead so that he may take the role of Jungle Emperor for himself. Bubu tries to capture Laiya so that she would become his queen and shows affection toward her. This romantic interest was not in the 1989 remake.
Toto (トット, Totto) / Cassius / Sylvester / Shaka
Voiced by (Japanese): Seizō Katō (1965 anime), Ryusei Nakao (1989 anime), Eiichiro Funakoshi (2009 TV movie)
Voiced by (English): Ray Owens (1965 anime)
A black panther working with Bubu to dethrone Leo and the white lions. He often acts as Bubu's adviser. In the 2009 movie he is a clone panther who rebels against his human creators and would become a close ally to Leo, seemingly sacrificing himself toward the end.
Dick (ディック, Dikku) / Tom
Voiced by (Japanese): Kazuo Kumakura (1965 anime)
Voiced by (English):
A tall, lanky hyena, almost always seen with his confederate Bo, who works with Bubu and Sylvester in their fiendish plans. He was created for the TV series to provide comic relief.
Bo (ボウ, Bō) / Tab
Voiced by (Japanese): Kiyoshi Kawakubo (1965 anime)
Voiced by (English):
A short, squat hyena, almost always seen with Dick, who works with Bubu and Sylvester. Along with Dick, he was created for the TV series to provide comic relief.
Kenichi (ケン一, Kenichi) / Roger Ranger
Voiced by (Japanese): Nobuaki Sekine (1965 anime), Kappei Yamaguchi (1989 anime), Akiko Yajima (2009 TV movie)
Voiced by (English): Hal Studer (1965 anime)
Shunsaku Ban's nephew who takes Leo in after he washes ashore. After a year living with Leo in human civilization, he decides to go to the jungle with Leo and live with him and the other animals. He teaches the animals how to speak to humans. In the 2009 movie, he is made a child with the ability to talk with animals in addition to being given the full name of Kenichi Oyama and made one of the main heroes and helps Leo return all the animals back to the "real" Jungle from the human created preserve called "Neo-Earth."
Mary (メリー, Merī)
Voiced by (Japanese): Yoshiko Yamamoto (1965 anime), Tomoko Nakajima (1997 movie)
Voiced by (English): Stephanie Sheh (1997 movie)
A young girl who was in love with Kenichi, but who then lost her memory for a while. During this time, she was the animal hunter Tonga. She regained her memory and left the jungle with Roger and Mr. Pompous. In the movie, Mary was the circus girl who lost her parents and takes good care of Lune, Leo's son.
Dr. Mustache (ヒゲオヤジ, Higeoyaji) / Mr. Pompous
Voiced by (Japanese): Junji Chiba (Go Ahead Leo!), Mahito Tsujimura (1989 anime), Kōsei Tomita (1997 movie)
Voiced by (English): Gilbert Mack (Go Ahead Leo!), Mike Pollock (1997 movie)
Kenichi's uncle who helps take care of Leo on the Arabian Peninsula. He then helps return Leo to the jungle and is one of the first to discover Mt. Moon. He often tries to get his nephew Kenichi to return to human civilization. Dr. Moustache has appeared in many of Tezuka's works as a detective under his real name of "Shunsaku Ban." In the movie, he saves Lukio, Bizo, and other animals from the dreaded speckled fever (a.k.a. the great plague).
Lamp (ランプ, Ranpu)
Voiced by (Japanese): Rokuro Naya (1989 anime)
Ronmel (ロンメル, Ronmeru)
Voiced by (Japanese): Tooru Oohira (1965 anime), Tōru Ōhira (1989 anime)
Ramune (ラムネ, Ramune)
Voiced by (Japanese): Yasunori Matsumoto
Voiced by (English): Jamie McGonnigal
Bizo (ビゾー, Bizō)
Voiced by (Japanese): Ranran Suzuki (1997 movie)
Voiced by (English): Michelle Newman (1997 movie)
A young male African bush elephant and Pagoola's son. Known for his habit of dismantling homes of many smaller animals because of his arrogant nature. For this reason, he is at odds with Lune, though they reluctantly have to work as a duo to free themselves from a dual-headed bear trap in Episode 18. Despite his arrogant nature, he is whiny, boisterous, and brutal; as seen in Episode 19, where he tears more homes of smaller animals asunder due to his apparent dislike of them, which sparked a fight between him and Lune which ends in a win for the calf. In the 1989 remakes, he was shown to be a bully, teasing the younger animals - which caused Bubu and Toto to lead a forest wide manhunt which ends in a short brawl between Leo and Bubu. Luckily, the misunderstanding was solved.
Plus (プラス, Purasu)
Voiced by (Japanese): Gorō Naya (Go Ahead Leo!), Yasuo Muramatsu (1997 movie)
Voiced by (English): Lex Woutas (1997 movie)
A head of the Science and Technology Agency who will to pay Ham Egg for leading them to the source of the Moon Stones. He has also gathered information on Ham Egg's activities and will blackmail him if necessary.
Minus (マイナス, Mainasu)
Voiced by (Japanese): Kōzō Shioya (1997 movie)
Voiced by (English): Zachary Alexander (1997 movie)
A member of the Science and Technology Agency who hopes to use the Moon Stone to provide a clean and potent energy source for the planet. His assistant is Mr. Lemonade.
Ham Egg (ハム・エッグ, Hamu Eggu) / Viper Snakely / Jake
Voiced by (Japanese): Kei Tomiyama (1989 anime), Danshi Tatekawa (1997 movie)
Voiced by (English): Gilbert Mack (1965 anime), Ted Lewis (1997 movie)
A poacher who will do anything for money. He killed Leo's father Panja before the former was born. Ham Egg has appeared as a villain in many of Tezuka's works.
Kutter (クッター, Kuttā) / Tubby
Voiced by (Japanese): Seizo Kato, Hiroshi Masuoka (1989 anime)
A sidekick to Ham Egg who has reservations about what the two of them are doing.
Specklerex
An old lion and Raiya's uncle, he lives in the mountains with a small pride of his own. He misjudges Leo, for the cub's father Panja was his rival. He went insane, causing havoc in a city, and even getting himself drunk in the process, especially when he gorged himself on barrels of wine and walked out with the hiccups. Because of his age, his mane is almost pale blonde.
Makoba / Silvertail the Renegade
A timid lion who was rumored to be stealing village livestock. He is often afraid of hunters who would kill him because of this rumor. He is an old lion like Specklerex, though he is two years younger and lacks the leopard rosettes. He only appears in the last episode.
Conga (コンガ, Konga)
Voiced by (Japanese): Masako Katsuki
Clave
Voiced by (Japanese): Gorō Naya (1965 anime)
Doug
Voiced by (Japanese): Kazuyuki Sogabe (1965 anime)
Dodie Deer, Gypsy, Henry Hedgehog
Voiced by (English): Billie Lou Watt (1965 anime, 1966 dub)
Coco, Mr. Pompous, Viper Snakely, Gargoyle T. Warthog, Claw, Tab
Voiced by (English): Gilbert Mack (1965 anime, 1966 dub)
Narrator, Tom, Stork, and Specklerex
Voiced by (English): Ray Owens (1965 anime, 1966 dub)
Mary, Mammoth, Bella Donna
Voiced by (English): Sonia Owens (1965 anime, 1966 dub)
Boss Rhino
A bad-tempered white rhinoceros who has a very strong hatred for mankind. Since Episode 3, this big bull has been at odds with Kimba (Leo), as most of their brawls always end in a victory for the young cub. He eventually changes his mind in Episode 38, when he learns that Kimba was using a makeshift raft to rescue a newborn rhino from an out of control volcano eruption. In the 1989 remake, he is older and wiser.
