= Raize =

Raize may refer to:

- Toyota Raize, a rebadged A200 series Daihatsu Rocky subcompact crossover SUV
- Jason Raize (1975–2004), an American actor
