= Jungle Emperor Leo =

Japanese anime film

- The North American DVD cover for Jungle Emperor Leo. Lune is portrayed on the cover.
- Directed by: Yoshio Takeuchi
- Written by: Yoshio Takeuchi
- Based on: Jungle Taitei by Osamu Tezuka
- Produced by: Minoru Kubota; Sumio Udagawa; Chiharu Akiba
- Music by: Isao Tomita
- Production company: Tezuka Productions
- Distributed by: Shochiku
- Release date: August 1, 1997
- Running time: 99 minutes
- Country: Japan
- Language: Japanese
- Box office: ¥430 million ($5.39 million)

Jungle Emperor Leo, known in Japan as Jungle Emperor: The Movie (Japanese: 劇場版 ジャングル大帝, Hepburn: Gekijōban Janguru Taitei) is a 1997 Japanese animated adventure drama film focusing on the last half of Osamu Tezuka's manga, Jungle Taitei (known in earlier US productions as Kimba the White Lion and Leo the Lion).

== Plot ==
At the beginning of the film, Leo is an adult and learns that his mate, Lyra, has just given birth to twin cubs; Lune, pronounced as "Lu-Ney" and Lukio. After a grand celebration, the scene changes drastically to a bustling city where a man named Ham Egg is traveling from jeweler to jeweler to try and sell a special stone he found in the Bajalu Jungle. After being turned down at every pawn shop and jeweler he goes to, the jewelers all inform someone of Ham Egg's whereabouts, and soon he is hauled away in a black car by intimidating men in black suits.

As it turns out, the stone that he has been trying to sell is really the "Moonlight Stone", a mineral that could be used as a power source and save the world from an impending energy crisis. A scientific organization led by Dr. Plus and Dr. Minus seek the help of Ham Egg to lead them to the source of the Moonlight Stone so it can be salvaged. But Ham Egg is only interested in money and is soon persuaded by Dr. Plus, who is well aware of Ham Egg's illegal poaching activities. Ham Egg agrees to work for them, but demands to be put in charge of the search. Accompanying Ham Egg is Mr. Lemonade of the organization and Dr. Moustache, who is already stationed in the jungle.

When they arrive in the jungle, Dr. Moustache and Mr. Lemonade are shocked by Ham Egg and his "friends", who lack concern for any form of animal. Dr. Moustache constantly argues with them over being respectful to nature, as Mr. Lemonade records everything that happens in his journal.

As Leo's son, Lune becomes more curious of the human world, Leo continues to protect the animals of the jungle from which may threaten them, including Ham Egg's barbarous actions, dissent amongst the animals including the African elephant leader Pagoola, and a deadly plague that is affecting the animals. But he is encouraged to go on by Earth Mother, the benevolent mammoth elder from Mount Moon.

Lune leaves the jungle behind and travels by a log in the water to a near by city. Lune is found by fishers and taken to a circus. An altruistic girl, named Mary from the circus decides to take care of him and he befriends a rat, named Jack. Eventually, a stork from the jungle finds Lune, tells him of how the disease is killing off many animals, and she leaves with her flock. Lune is frightened by the idea that his family may be dead. Eventually, there is a fire in the circus, and Lune gets all the animals to help put it out. Lune, Jack, and Mary, who took care of Lune bid their goodbyes, and Lune sneaks onto a boat that will help him get back to Africa. In the jungle, Lyra is affected by the deadly disease and shortly dies. Although Lukio comes down with the same ailment, Dr. Moustache is able to cure her and others, including Pagoora's son thus proving humans can be friends to animals.

Leo decides to lead Dr. Moustache and Dr. Lemonade to the center of the mountain where there are many moonlight stones. They go up the mountain, guided by Earth Mother who helps them fight a pack of dire wolves. Many hunters are lost on the way, but finally, they arrive. As they discover the stones, Ham Egg shoots at the trio. At the last minute, Mr. Lemonade jumps in the way, takes the bullet himself, and dies. They soon discover the stones and Ham Egg, blinded by greed, steals one of the stones and swallows it so no one else can have it, but dies shortly afterward because the stone poisoned him. Dr. Moustache takes Leo and together they escape back down the mountain. It is then that Moustache suddenly realizes that the lion has gone blind. He rids of the stone they got because he believes it has ruined enough lives.

The film ends with Lune returning from the human world, and Dr. Moustache taking the cub to see his father's pelt. Leo died on the journey by stabbing himself with Dr. Moustache's knife. He did this so Dr. Moustache could eat his flesh, and clothe himself with Leo's fur so he can tell the humans what they need to know. Lune then begins nuzzling his fur. Dr. Moustache tells Lune about what his father did, "Your father was as wise as he was brave, and you should know what he did to save the world. He was the most courageous soul I have ever met, a true king who gave his life to save the land". Then, both of them head out into a meadow and see clouds in the shape of Leo.

== Cast ==
Character	(Japan) Original Japanese version	(United States) English dubbed version
Leo	Masane Tsukayama	Dan Green
Lyre	Chieko Baisho	Veronica Taylor
Lune	Tomoko Ishimura	Tara Sands
Lukio	Hekiru Shiina	Elizabeth Williams
Tommy	Naoki Tatsuta	Michael Sinterniklaas
Coco	Kaneta Kimotsuki	David Wills
Burazza	Kei Tani	Kayzie Rogers
Pagoola	Masatō Ibu	David Brimmer
Bizo	Ranran Suzuki	Michelle Newman
Mary	Tomoko Nakajima	Stephanie Sheh
Higeoyaji	Kōsei Tomita	Mike Pollock
Ham Egg	Danshi Tatekawa	Ted Lewis
Ramune	Yasunori Matsumoto	Jamie McGonnigal
Dr. Minus	Kōzō Shioya	Zachary Alexander
Dr. Plus	Yasuo Muramatsu	Lex Woutas

== See also ==
- List of Osamu Tezuka manga
- List of Osamu Tezuka anime
- Osamu Tezuka's Star System
