= Jack and the Witch =

- Front cover of Japanese DVD of the film

Japanese name
- Kanji: 少年ジャックと魔法使い
Transcriptions
- Revised Hepburn: Shōnen Jakku to Mahōtsukai
- Directed by: Taiji Yabushita
- Written by: Shin'ichi Sekizawa; Susumu Takaku
- Produced by: Hiroshi Ōkawa
- Starring: Meiko Nakamura; Chiharu Kuri; Tetsuko Kuroyanagi
- Cinematography: Hideaki Sugawara
- Edited by: Yutaka Chikura
- Music by: Seiichirō Uno
- Production company: Tōei Animation
- Distributed by: Tōei Company
- Release date: March 19, 1967
- Running time: 80 minutes
- Country: Japan
- Language: Japanese

Jack and the Witch (少年ジャックと魔法使い, Shōnen Jakku to Mahōtsukai; lit. 'The Boy Jack and the Witch') is a Japanese animated fantasy adventure feature film, the 10th cinema feature produced by Tōei Animation (then Tōei Dōga), released in Japan in 1967. It was developed by Jirō Sekimasa, Seiichi Moro and Takeshi Ariga, written by Shin'ichi Sekizawa and Susumu Takaku and directed by Taiji Yabushita and has an essentially original story, though one which alludes in structure and character names to the Jack tales and Beowulf, both of English folklore. A working title for the film was Fushigina Sekai no Daibōken (ふしぎな世界の大冒険; "Great Adventure in a Strange Land"). The animation director is Akira Daikuhara.

It is one of a number of Tōei Dōga features licensed by the television division of American International Pictures and localised by Titan Productions, Jack's English-dubbed version being directed by Peter Solmo and made available for syndication starting in 1969. Corinne Orr, of Speed Racer fame, is the voice of Allegra in the English-language version.

== Plot ==
The film opens with a retelling of Beowulf, narrated over pans of paintings imitative of stained glass, then cuts to Jack, a boy who lives with his animal friends Barnaby Bear, Dinah Dog, Squeeker Mouse and Phineas Fox and drives a car resembling a Ford Model T, even inside the house. One day while out driving Jack sees a girl named Allegra in a flying machine and challenges her to race. After he loses Allegra offers him a ride and he accepts, along with Squeeker Mouse who sneaks aboard. Allegra is actually a witch, and takes Jack to the castle of the evil queen Auriana, who changes children into harpies to be her slaves. Squeeker is sucked into a machine that changes him into a harpy but Jack escapes. When Allegra and another harpy named Harvey Harpy pursue Jack he leads them away from the castle. Harvey Harpy ends up lassoing Jack's animal friends and they get tangled together in the rope.

Barnaby Bear starts laughing at the predicament, and soon all are laughing. They take Harvey Harpy back to the house, where they sing and dance together. Spying on them through a window Allegra seems to soften a little as she watches the fun. However, when Jack returns to the house she tries to capture him with a magic rope that has a claw on the end, but the animals drive her away by pelting her with dishes. In some fan copies of the English version about 8 minutes is cut out here, including scenes where Allegra returns to the castle and a battle between Allegra and Jack where she pulls his house off the ground and drops it into a lake. Allegra is injured when she crash lands her flying machine, and Jack takes her back to his house to let her recover. When she comes to she sees Jack, and smiles for a moment, but then flees back to the castle, knocking Jack over as she goes. Jack and friends go back to the castle to rescue Squeeker Mouse, and they encounter Allegra again. She promises to help them since they were so kind to her when she was injured, but instead she leads them into a trap that drops them into a land where the plants try to eat everybody.

At the end giant mushrooms drop Jack and friends into a pit with the machine that changes children into harpies. The wind starts to suck Jack into the machine, while the Harpies chant 'Into the Machine!'. Barnaby Bear remembers that a giant windmill powers the machine, so he runs off and stops it. With the windmill immobilized other harpies jump into the pit to take Jack prisoner, but Barnaby Bear finally lets go of the windmill and the harpies are sucked into the machine, which overloads and explodes, with Jack and friends escaping. Queen Auriana punishes Allegra for her failure to capture Jack by exiling her to the ice caves beneath the castle. Harvey Harpy is sad to see Allegra punished, even opposing the queen for her harshness, so when he runs into Jack he explains what happened to Allegra, and leads him to the ice caves to rescue her. Meanwhile, Barnaby Bear, Phineas Fox and Dinah Dog are captured by the queen, who imprisons them in magic bottles and leaves them to watch what happens to Jack in a crystal ball. When Jack rescues Allegra from the ice caves, the queen transports them back to the pit, where she battles them with a golden chain she uses as a whip.

When Squeeker Mouse tries to cover up the crystal ball with his cape so no one can see what is happening to Jack he knocks the crystal ball to the ground and it cracks. This breaks the spell imprisoning the animals, and they realize that the crystal is the source of the queen's power. Barnaby Bear throws the crystal ball out the window, and when it shatters the queen loses her powers and is transformed into a large goblin-like creature. Jack and friends pursue the queen, who has a large air-ship ready for her escape. She sets a time bomb to explode after she leaves, but Harvey Harpy ties the bomb to her air-ship as it takes off. As the queen tries to remove the bomb she crashes into the castle and explodes. This destroys the castle and breaks the spell cast by the evil queen, and one by one all the harpies turn back into children, including Allegra and Harvey, who celebrate with Jack.

== Voice cast ==
- Boy Jack (少年ジャック, Shōnen Jakku)

Voiced by: Meiko Nakamura (Japanese);Stephen Garlick (English)

- Devil girl Kiky (悪魔の少女キキー, Akuma no shōjo Kikī), Allegra (English)

Voiced by: Meiko Nakamura (Japanese); Corinne Orr (English)

- Kiky's younger brother Shibari (キキーの弟シバリ, Kikī no otōto Shibari), Harvey Harpy (English)

Voiced by: Chiharu Kuri (Japanese); ??? (English)

- Mouse (ネズミ, Nezumi), Squeaker Mouse (English)

Voiced by: Tetsuko Kuroyanagi (Japanese); ??? (English)

- Bear cub (子熊, Kokuma), Barnaby Bear (English)

Voiced by: Kazuo Kumakura (Japanese); ??? (English)

- Fox (キツネ, Kitsune), Phineas Fox (English)

Voiced by: Hiroshi Ōtake (Japanese); Billie Lou Watt (English)

- Puppy (子犬, Koinu), Dinah Dog (English)

Voiced by: Yōko Mizugaki

- Witch Grendel (魔女グレンデル, Majo Gurenderu), Auriana (English)

Voiced by: Hisano Yamaoka (Japanese); Corinne Orr (English)

- Little devils (小悪魔, Shō akuma), harpies (English)

Voiced by: Makiko Itō, Makoto Yuasa, Kenji Nakagawa, Kiyoko Yamamoto and Kazuko Yoshikawa

- Additional voices

Voiced by: Jōji Yanami, Masako Nozawa, Keiko Yamamoto, Hiroshi Masuoka, Yōko Kuri, Mari Kitagawa, Hiromi Yamagishi, Takako Kondō and Sanjūnin-kai

== Release ==
Jack and the Witch is currently available as a region 2 DVD from Toei Video. The audio is Japanese, without an option for English audio or subtitles. Amazon Prime Video has the English version for sale or rent. Fan copies of the English version can sometimes be found on EBay or on fan sites.

== Reception ==
Starting at KTLA in Los Angeles, Jack and the Witch became an annual tradition to show on Halloween on stations across North America during the 1970's.
