= Taro the Dragon Boy =

- Directed by: Kiriro Urayama
- Written by: Isao Takahata (concept)
- Screenplay by: Kiriro Urayama; Takashi Mitsui
- Based on: Taro, the Dragon Boy by Miyoko Matsutani
- Produced by: Toei Doga
- Starring: Kazuo Kitamura; Sayuri Yoshinaga; Junya Kato; Kirin Kiki; Kazuo Kumakura
- Cinematography: Motoi Takahashi
- Edited by: Yasuhiro Yoshikawa
- Music by: Riichiro Manabe
- Distributed by: Toei Animation
- Release date: 17 March 1979
- Running time: 75 minutes
- Country: Japan
- Language: Japanese

Taro the Dragon Boy (龍の子太郎, Tatsu no ko Tarō) is a 1979 film adaptation of a famous Japanese folk tale, and the novel Taro, the Dragon Boy by Miyoko Matsutani. In 1966, Taro, the Son of Dragon with the original Japanese title of "Tatsu, no ko Taro", started as a puppet series on a Japanese television channel. In the late 1970s the anime television series Taro the Dragon Boy (original story by Miyoko Matsutani) was shown on Doordarshan.

== Plot ==
In the distant past of Japan, a lazy and selfish Taro loves to eat and sleep and wrestle with the animals. With no direction in his life, a Tengu appears that gives him a special potion. With this potion, he gains the strength of a hundred men – but he can only use it when he is helping others. After drinking the potion, Taro, day by day, begins to understand what it means to help others, first by fighting Akaoni (Red Oni) to save Aya, a young girl gifted with the flute, then by helping others in his village collect fire wood.

One night his grandmother tells him of his mother's transformation into a dragon. Taro then begins his search for his mother. Before his search for his mother starts, Taro again confronts Akaoni after hearing from the animals that Aya was captured by Kurooni (Black Oni). After a brief fight, Akaoni agrees to help Taro save Aya from Kurooni. After besting Kurooni, Taro finds out he has also saved a village terrorized by Kurooni and Akaoni, the latter bullied into the former's service.

Taro then aids Akaoni by throwing him into the clouds to serve the thunder god. After the village celebrates Taro's deeds, he starts his search. He comes upon an old woman and is tricked into service in her rice paddies. After a successful harvest year and learning the truth from a giant serpent living in the lake next to the old woman's rice farm, Taro takes the fruits of his labor and gives it to the old woman's former employees and others, leaving her with little.

During his conversation with the serpent, Taro learns that nine mountains over lives a yamanba that could point him in the right direction. Taro takes that information and finds the yamanba. The yamanba tells him what he seeks and lets slip she was responsible for the serpent. After narrowly escaping the yamanba, Taro is overpowered by yukionna.

The following morning, Aya finds Taro near frozen and able to revive him. With her aid, Taro finds the lake where his mother, Tatsu, now lives. Tatsu tells Taro why she was transformed; as a mother heavy with child fulfilling her duties to her unborn child, she needed to eat, but neglecting her duties to the rest of her village, she left nothing of her catch for the other workers.

Taro then proposes a means to make the lives of the villagers back home better, by making for them a new home with large rice paddies. Taro and Tatsu then attempt to break the dam that formed the lake Tatsu resides in. Although they succeed, Tatsu's body is broken, and after seeing the lake had emptied, Taro concludes she had died. He mourns the loss of his mother, only to realize that her life has returned and she is human yet again, much to his relief. Their actions are successful and the new flooded low lands enable prosperity for all the villagers Taro has helped, not only along his way but from his home village.

== A Shock for Chinese Audiences ==
"Taro the Dragon Boy" was the first animated film imported from Japan to China. It was released in 1979, and at the time many kindergartens organized outings for children to watch it—the box office did very well. It was an era of social conservatism not long after the Cultural Revolution had just ended. In the film's ending, a shot of Taro's mother completely nude appears with no censorship or alteration in China. As it was the first time the audience had seen a nude woman in a movie, it was extremely shocking. Yet in the 21st century, on online video platforms in China, the nude scene from this film was handled with censorship.

== Cast ==
Character	Original	English
Aya	Miina Tominaga	Unknown
Niwatori-chouja	Kazuo Kitamura	Unknown
Red Oni	Kazuo Kumakura	Unknown
Taro	Junya Kato	Billie Lou Watt
Tatsuya	Sayuri Yoshinaga	Unknown
Yamanba	Kirin Kiki	Unknown

== See also ==
- Kintarō, hero from a similar fairy tale
- Momotarō, hero from a similar fairy tale
