= Simba =

Fictional character from The Lion King

- The Lion King character
- A promotional image of adult Simba
- First appearance: The Lion King (1994)
- Created by: Irene Mecchi; Jonathan Roberts; Linda Woolverton
- Voiced by: Matthew Broderick (adult; main 3 films); Jonathan Taylor Thomas (cub; 1st film); Joseph Williams (adult; singing in 1st film, The Lion King II: Simba's Pride Active Play and Mickey's Magical Christmas: Snowed in at the House of Mouse); Jason Weaver (cub; singing; 1st film); Evan Saucedo (cub; singing; 1st film (The Morning Report only)); Ryan O'Donohue (cub; Disney's Animated Storybook: The Lion King and Disney's Activity Center: The Lion King); Shaun Fleming (cub; The Lion King: Simba's Mighty Adventure); Bret Loehr (cub; Disney's Extreme Skate Adventure); Matt Weinberg (cub; The Lion King 1½); Oliver King (cub; singing; The Lion King 1½); Kathryn Haywood (cub; The Lion King: Simba's Big Adventure); Colin Ford (cub; Disney Friends); Cam Clarke (spin-offs, merchandise and singing in Simba's Pride); Rob Lowe (The Lion Guard); Donald Glover (adult; 2019 remake and Mufasa: The Lion King); JD McCrary (cub; 2019 remake)
- Inspired by: Prince Hamlet; Moses; Joseph

In-universe information
- Species: Lion (Panthera leo)
- Family: Mufasa (father); Sarabi (mother); Timon & Pumbaa (adoptive fathers); Bunga (adoptive brother)
- Spouse: Nala (wife)
- Children: Kopa (son); Kiara (daughter); Kion (son)
- Relatives: Sarafina (mother-in-law); Kovu (son-in-law); Rani (daughter-in-law); Scar (paternal uncle); Ahadi (paternal grandfather; in Six New Adventures); Uru (paternal grandmother; in Six New Adventures); Mohatu (paternal great-grandfather; in The Brightest Star); Kamaria (grandmother)

Simba is a fictional character in Disney's The Lion King franchise. He first appears as the main protagonist in The Lion King (1994), starting as a cub where he flees the Pride Lands after his father, Mufasa, is murdered by his uncle, Scar, who deceives Simba into believing he is responsible for the death. Years later, Simba returns as an adult to confront Scar and reclaim his rightful place as king of the Pride Lands. He subsequently appears in the sequels The Lion King II: Simba's Pride and The Lion King 1½.

Created by The Lion King's screenwriters, Irene Mecchi, Jonathan Roberts, and Linda Woolverton, Simba underwent several changes as the film's story developed, including making him a more sympathetic character and establishing his familial relation to Scar. Although conceived as an original character, Simba was inspired by Moses and Joseph from the Bible, as well as the title character from William Shakespeare's Hamlet. Despite sharing similarities with the character from the anime television series Kimba the White Lion, Disney has refuted claims that Simba was inspired by Kimba. Mark Henn and Ruben A. Aquino were supervising animators for the cub and adult Simba, respectively, with both animators researching live lions and drawing inspiration from the character's voice actors. Simba was originally voiced by actors Jonathan Taylor Thomas as a cub and an adult by Matthew Broderick, respectively; various actors have voiced the character in sequels, spin-offs, and related media.

Simba has received a mixed reception from film critics, some of whom praised his design but found him uninteresting as a main character. However, several publications have ranked Simba among Disney's most iconic characters, and consider him to be one of the most famous lions in popular culture. The character's likeness has been used in several tie-in products, including merchandise, television series, and video games. In 1997, The Lion King actors Scott Irby-Ranniar and Jason Raize originated the role on Broadway. In 2019, Donald Glover and JD McCrary voiced the character in a photorealistic remake of the film.

== Role ==
Simba first appears in The Lion King as a cub, the son of King Mufasa and Queen Sarabi. As Mufasa's heir, Simba is destined to become the next King of the Pride Lands. However, Simba's jealous uncle Scar plots against him in order to seize the throne for himself, betraying and killing Mufasa after he rescues Simba from a wildebeest stampede, and then deceiving Simba into believing he is responsible for Mufasa's death. Crippled with guilt, Simba flees to the jungle where he befriends Timon and Pumbaa, a meerkat and warthog who raise him and teach him to live the carefree lifestyle, but, for some reason, Simba hadn't noticed that he continuously struggles to ignore his past just for close attention. Years later, Simba's childhood friend Nala finds him and convinces him to return to the Pride Lands which has grown barren and starving under Scar's rule. After being visited by Rafiki and Mufasa's spirit who reminds him of his responsibilities, Simba confronts Scar who finally admits to killing Mufasa and defeats him, reclaiming his rightful place as king. With order restored and Scar killed by the hyenas, Simba and Nala have a child, thus ushering in hope for the future of the Pride Lands.

In The Lion King II: Simba's Pride, Simba and Nala commemorate the birth of their daughter, Kiara, who Simba is overprotective of since she grows up to be adventurous and rebellious like he was as a cub. Simba discovers that Kiara has visited the forbidden Outlands – home to an enemy pride of Scar's exiled followers known as the Outsiders – and befriended Kovu, the younger son of the pride's leader, Zira. Unbeknownst to them, Zira is grooming Kovu to avenge Scar by usurping Simba. Several years later, Kovu rescues Kiara from a wildfire started by Kovu's siblings, Nuka and Vitani. Simba reluctantly lets Kovu, who claims to have left the Outsiders, live with them, but continues to act coldly towards him. Witnessing Kiara and Kovu's growing friendship, Simba decides to spend a day getting to know Kovu. Realizing that Kovu is beginning to side with Simba due to his feelings for Kiara, Zira ambushes Simba and convinces him that Kovu orchestrated the attack. After narrowly escaping with his life, Simba exiles Kovu and warns Kiara against seeing him, prompting her to leave. When a battle ensues between the Pride Landers and Outsiders, Kiara and Kovu return to stop them, with Kiara helping Simba and the prides reconcile their differences peacefully. Zira attacks Simba as he is about to accept the Outsiders back into his pride, but he she is intercepted by Kiara, causing the pair of lionesses to tumble over the edge of a cliff. Having landed safely on a ledge, Kiara offers to help Zira, who is struggling to hang on. However, Zira, consumed by resentment, refuses help and falls to her death. Simba finally accepts Kovu into the pride and reconciles with his daughter.

In The Lion King 1½, Simba appears as a less prominent character because the film's primary focus is on Timon and Pumbaa's behind-the-scenes role and involvement in the events of The Lion King. Although the two films technically share the same story and timeline, the plot of The Lion King 1½ focuses more on Timon and Pumbaa. The meerkat and warthog unknowingly coexist alongside Simba, and the story fills in the two characters' backstories and events that led up to their long-lasting friendship, coinciding with and often initiating the events that affect Simba's life during the first film. These events include the commemorative bow that occurs during the opening "Circle of Life" musical number and the collapsing of the animal tower that takes place during "I Just Can't Wait to Be King". The film also explores, in further detail, the relationship among the three characters as Timon and Pumbaa struggle to raise Simba as adoptive "parents" and disapprove of his relationship with Nala,

== Development ==
=== Creation ===
The Lion King was conceived in 1988. Although considered an original story (Note: Disney has stated that The Lion King was their first "original" animated film, in the sense that its story is not directly based on or adapted from any pre-existing work or material. Although loosely inspired by and sharing several similarities with William Shakespeare's play Hamlet, The Lion King is not considered to be an adaptation of the play.) that follows a young lion, Simba, becoming an adult and learning to take responsibility for his actions, the film's creators drew inspiration for the character from various sources, namely several coming-of-age stories and the biblical figures Moses and Joseph. The film underwent several title changes, one of the earliest of which was King of the Jungle. According to producer Don Hahn, this title was intended to serve as an allegory about Simba needing to survive and grow up in both a literal and metaphorical jungle. However, they renamed it The Lion King upon realizing lions don't live in jungles, and wanting to shift focus to a simpler story about a lion becoming king. Some filmmakers nicknamed the film "Bambi in Africa" due to similarities between The Lion King and Disney's own Bambi. The name "Simba" is the Swahili word for "lion". Unlike Disney's three previous romantic films The Little Mermaid, Beauty and the Beast, and Aladdin, The Lion King focuses on Simba's relationship with his father.

In April 1992, the filmmakers hosted a "brainstorming session" in which much of the film, including Simba's personality, was re-written. Story supervisor Brenda Chapman realized they had written a proud, unlikeable character. Originally, Simba was intended to remain with his pride after Mufasa's death until this was revised to make him a more sympathetic character. Additionally, one of the earliest iterations of Scar was a rogue lion unrelated to Simba, whereas Simba was meant to be raised by Scar in another version. According to Disney Theatrical Group president Tom Schumacher, Scar was planned to kill Simba and Mufasa at the same time, only for other characters to mistake him for saving Simba from the stampede. Instead of meeting Timon and Pumbaa, this version of Simba would have grown up a slacker under Scar's reign, making him easier to overthrow. A short scene depicting a young Simba wandering the desert before meeting Timon and Pumbaa was also cut.

Screenwriter Linda Woolverton, one of the writers credited with creating the character, joined the film to revise its screenplay, which included providing Simba with a stronger adversary by changing the rogue lion into Simba's uncle. She felt the change contributed more Shakespearean elements to the story. The character has often been compared to Prince Hamlet from William Shakespeare's tragedy Hamlet. In an earlier version of the script, Simba was meant to lose his final fight to Scar, being thrown from Pride Rock before his uncle ultimately dies in a fire. Nala's younger brother Mheetu, who Simba was to have rescued from a stampede, was also written out of the film, as well as a trio of Simba's childhood friends. For a while, the story team struggled to come up with a convincing reason as to why Simba would believe he was responsible for Mufasa's death, without killing him. Story artist Chris Sanders explained that the key to this was eventually accepting that a child in an extremely emotional state would simply believe what their uncle told them.

Addressing online speculation that Simba and Nala could potentially be related since Mufasa and Scar are the only adult male lions identified in the film, Woolverton acknowledged that although it is possible, she had never written Simba and Nala as cousins or siblings. Although Woolverton admitted that songs such as "Hakuna Matata" were non-essential to the plot and arrived later during the writing process, she confirmed that it helps demonstrate Simba during his "lost boy" phase. Some of Disney's marketing team doubted Simba's marketability, since most of Disney's lead characters at the time were female or princesses.

=== Voice ===
Actor Matthew Broderick provided the speaking voice of adult Simba. The first actor cast for The Lion King, Broderick learned that Disney was interested in him for the lead role while he was vacationing in Ireland, to where Disney sent him sketches of Simba. The filmmakers hired him based on his performance in the teen comedy film Ferris Bueller's Day Off. According to Hahn, Broderick was cast because his voice invoked a character who could be irresponsible yet likeable enough to redeem himself. Minkoff recalled that the actor was able to humanize the character, preventing the hero from "becoming 2-dimensional" using a combination of sensitivity, thoughtfulness, and humor. Having been involved in the film since early development, Broderick said he had always assumed The Lion King was an adaptation of Hamlet, elements of which were most prominent when he was first cast. Broderick worked on the film on-and-off for two-three years, often re-recording his work to match what the animators had drawn several months later. He also slightly lowered his pitch to establish Simba's maturity once he decides to become king. Although Broderick recorded most of his lines alone, he briefly recorded with an actress who had originally been cast as Nala until she was ultimately replaced with Moira Kelly, which Broderick only learned had happened at the film's premiere. The actor said he sometimes felt left out when recording his lines, which were more somber in comparison to the film's supporting cast.

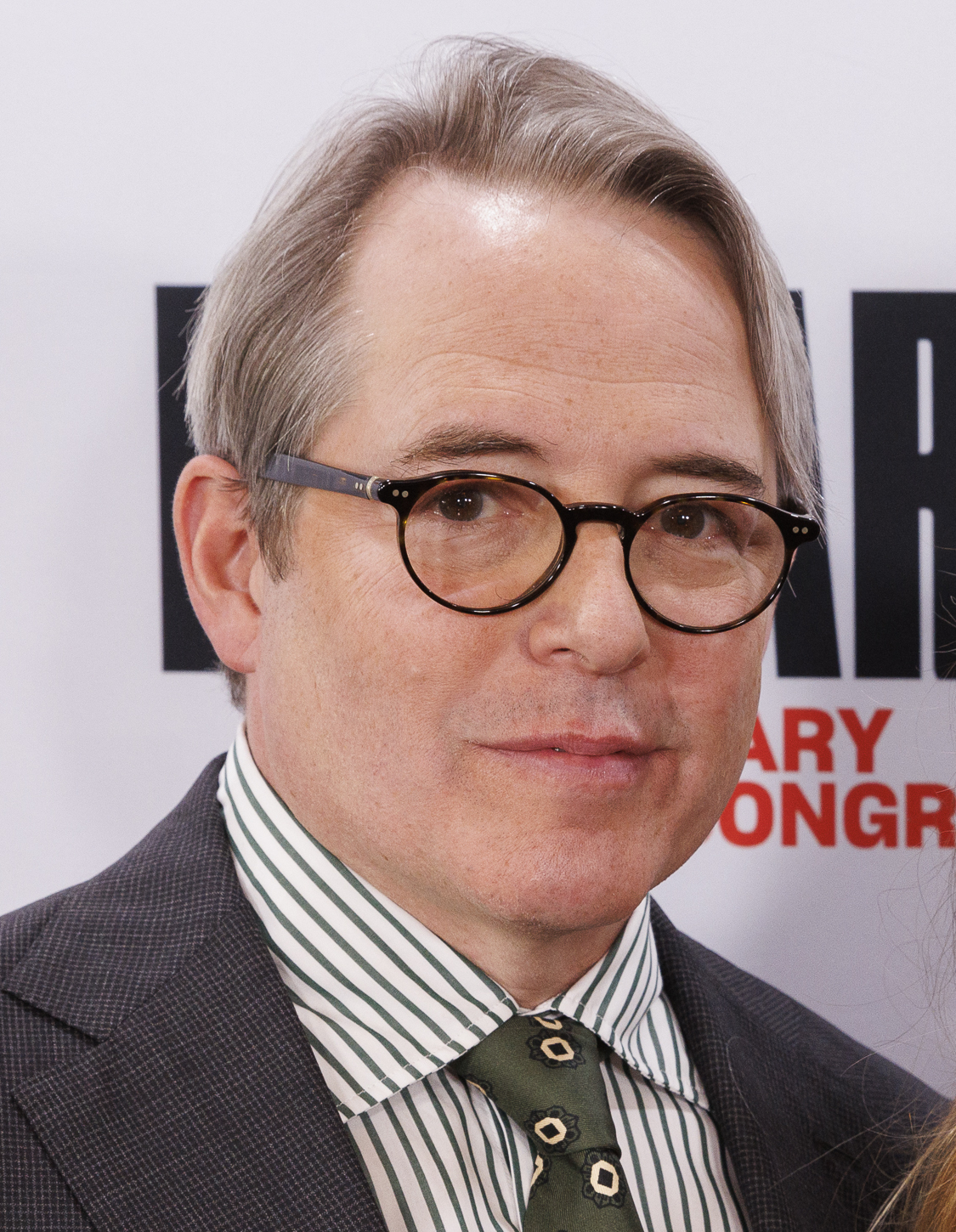
Matthew Broderick voiced the adult Simba.

Disney auditioned dozens of child actors for the role of young Simba, searching for an actor who could embody "a scrappy young kid". Actor Jonathan Taylor Thomas was cast as the speaking voice of young Simba. He was 12 years-old at the time. Thomas did not alter his voice for the character, but simply spoke "with a real kid spirit" since Simba had been described to him by the film's directors as "energetically cocky". Thomas recorded his lines in hour-long sessions over the course of a year and a half. Because he was working by himself, he improvised much of what other characters were supposed to be saying to his character due to the lack of other actors on set. Due to his busy schedule, Thomas recorded some his dialogue on the Home Improvement set, the sitcom on which he was starring at the time, since both productions were filmed on Disney's Burbank lot. His recording sessions were video recorded, which animators used to incorporate some of Thomas' expressions and mannerisms into their drawings, namely the actor's "sly smile". His appearance and personality served as creative inspiration for supervising animator Mark Henn in particular. The actor found Simba's curiosity similar to his own. He also likened Simba to his Home Improvement character Randy Taylor, describing both as curious, intuitive, confident, and quick-witted. Hahn recalled "rough[ing Thomas] up" during certain recording sessions when his character was intended to sound active or out of breath, in order to deliver a convincing performance.

Although Broderick recorded his character's songs twice, the studio opted not to use his vocals in the final film, which the actor attributed to Disney being interested in a poppier sound than he was capable of delivering. Toto lead singer Joseph Williams and actor Jason Weaver provided the singing voices of adult and young Simba, respectively. Williams was originally hired to record all of Aladdin's vocals. However, Aladdin's songwriters preferred a more theatrical voice over Williams', and ultimately replaced him with actor Brad Kane. Several months later, Disney's music supervisor Chris Montan invited Williams back to record some demos, which ultimately became the songs used in The Lion King. Although Williams speculated that he would be replaced similar to Aladdin, all of his vocals were retained in the final film. Williams claims Broderick was upset that Disney had decided to dub him. He recorded "Hakuna Matata" and "Can You Feel the Love Tonight" for the film.

Impressed by Weaver's performance as a young Michael Jackson in the miniseries The Jacksons: An American Dream, songwriters Elton John and Tim Rice recruited him to record "I Just Can't Wait to Be King" and "Hakuna Matata" while The Lion King was still in its early stages and little animation had been completed. Weaver said the songwriters approached his mother about wanting Simba's singing voice to have "a young Michael Jackson vibe". Weaver recorded "I Just Can't Wait to Be King" only a few days after completing the miniseries, with John in particular vouching for his involvement in The Lion King. His meeting with Disney in Burbank was intended to only be an audition but he ultimately recorded "I Just Can't Wait to Be King" in two takes, completing his work before he had to fly back to Chicago. His recording from the audition was ultimately retained for the final film, which Weaver said they had prepared for extensively prior. Impressed by his performance, the directors considered offering Weaver the speaking role as well before learning that negotiations with Thomas had already been finalized. Disney originally offered Weaver $2 million USD for his work on The Lion King, but Weaver's mother declined in favor of a deal securing $100,000 upfront and lifetime royalties. Weaver receives a portion of the film's revenue every time it is re-released, and his total earnings have since exceeded Disney's initial offer. Weaver was not invited to the film's premiere and did little promotion for it, which he attributes to Disney's desire to use the bigger names in the cast to promote the film. Voice actor Frank Welker provided the roars of adult Simba and all other lions, simulating the effect using a trash can.

=== Personality and design ===
Disney has long denied accusations that The Lion King is based on the anime series Kimba the White Lion, despite similarities between the names "Simba" and "Kimba", as well as some concept art depicting Simba as a white lion. The studio maintains that any parallels are coincidental. However, Broderick said he thought he had originally been cast in an American remake of Kimba because the characters seemed so similar to him at first. Because Disney was prioritizing Pocahontas over The Lion King, the former of which most of their experienced animators gravitated towards since the studio considered it the more promising of the two projects, Simba was one of the few Lion King characters animated at the studio's main California location. This proved challenging for the production team because Simba shares several scenes with characters who were animated in Florida.

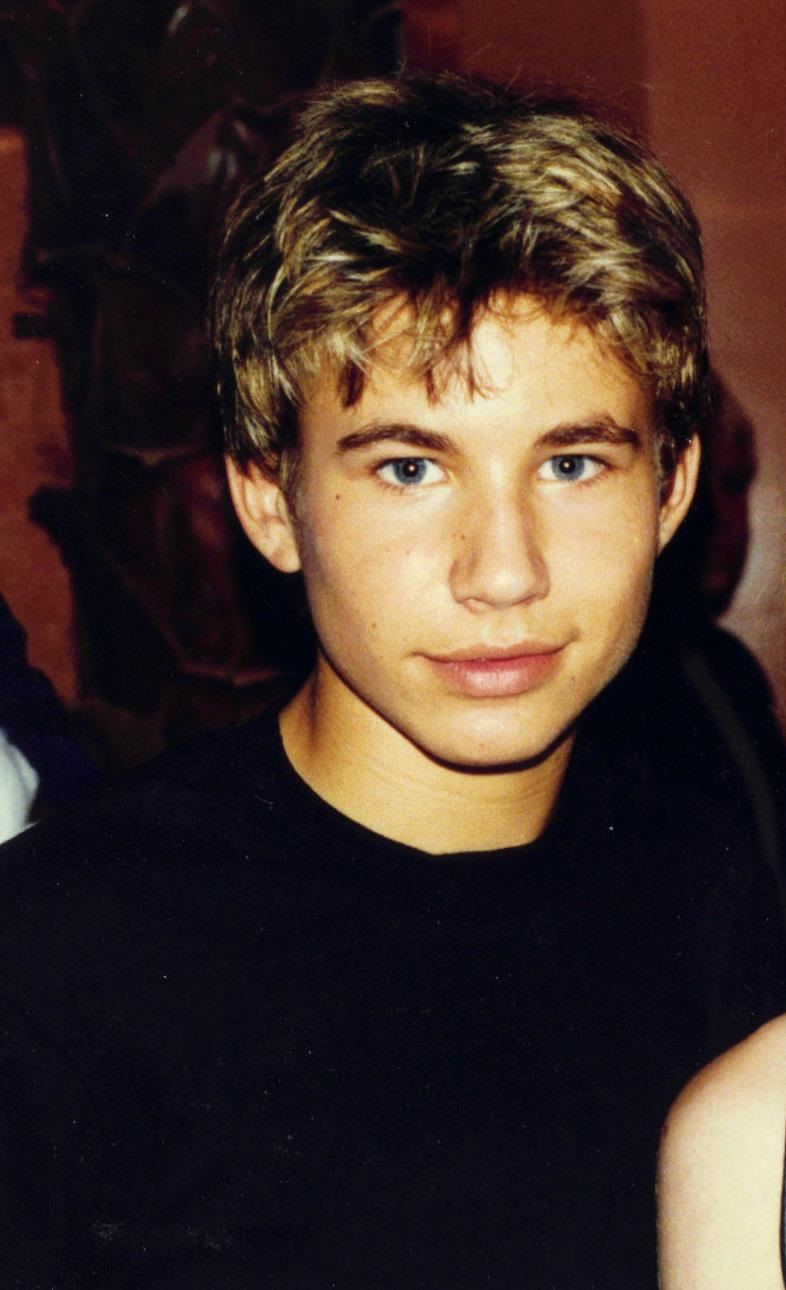
Actor Jonathan Taylor Thomas voiced young Simba and served as visual inspiration for his animators.

The role of Simba's supervising animator was divided between Ruben A. Aquino and Mark Henn, the former of whom was the first animator hired for The Lion King. Henn served as the supervising animator of Simba as a cub, and Aquino animated him as an adult. Aquino and Henn worked on the character from Disney's California and Florida studios, respectively. According to Aquino, animating four-legged creatures is difficult because artists are required to draw twice as many legs as human characters, while still incorporating human-like qualities. For assistance, Aquino drew inspiration from Disney's previous animal films such as Bambi, Lady and the Tramp, and The Jungle Book. Aquino based his early drawings of Simba on Broderick, whose voice he said offers the character "a lot of humor and vulnerability ... which really gave me something to go on and made it easier for me to flesh out my performance". Aquino would quietly sketch Broderick live during his sessions, which would end up informing each other's performances. Because the adult version of the character is introduced mildly depressed, Aquino originally drew him with sad, soulful eyes and a disheveled mane, but redesigned him to look more heroic at Hahn's request. As a result, Simba ended up resembling Mufasa. To make sure the character looked believable, Aquino studied live lions loaned to the studio and consulted with zoologists.

Henn animated Simba's scenes from the beginning of the film until approximately the "Hakuna Matata" sequence, including Simba's first appearance as an adult towards the end of the musical number. Before The Lion King, his experience as a supervising animator was limited to predominantly female characters, having previously worked on Ariel from The Little Mermaid, Belle from Beauty and the Beast, and Jasmine from Aladdin. He initially campaigned heavily to animate the film's villain, Scar, because he wanted to do something different than the princesses he had become known for, but Hahn convinced him to work on Simba due to his experience with main characters. Hahn reminded Henn that the success of the entire film hinges on Simba's design, since he is considered the most important character in The Lion King, and the animator found it a welcome departure from leading ladies nonetheless. Aside from Andreas Deja who ultimately animated Scar, Henn was the most tenured animator on The Lion King, whose roster mostly consisted of newer or first-time animators. Simba proved to be a challenge because Henn was tasked with creating an animated character who would both appear and behave like a real lion cub for the first time. To achieve believability, Henn visited zoos, studied live lion cubs that were loaned to the studio for research, and consulted with wildlife professionals. Henn maintained that animators can not simply use their cats as reference models due to their different anatomies. Recalling their efforts to make his character as realistic as possible, Henn said that, unlike domestic cats, lion cubs “have a power ... underlying that seemingly soft exterior". He was also responsible for making sure Simba's appearance remained consistent between himself, the directors, and other animators.

When it came to animating the "I Just Can't Wait to Be King" musical sequence, Henn insisted that Simba remain on all-fours, despite the character exhibiting human characteristics by dancing. The animators would often observe and film the actors' recording sessions, using their mannerisms as visual reference, with Thomas proving particularly influential on Simba's design and personality. Henn described his version of the character as a young, cocky, inexperienced cub who had yet to mature, which he hoped would remind viewers of their younger selves. Compared to adult Simba, Simba is "looser" and less physically assured, which allowed Henn to draw him "a little more awkward, his feet were a little bigger, they could be a little floppier than when he's an adult". Although Henn and Aquino did not spend much time discussing the character's design with each other, both artists referenced live lions and received input from the same research team to determine how Simba should look and behave. Catherine Hinman of the Orlando Sentinel observed that the animators' extensive research resulted in "a lion cub who moves like his aristocratic cousins on the savannah but acts like the kid down the street". Tom Bancroft, an animator who worked on Simba under Henn, described his supervisor as the fastest animator at Disney at the time, making it difficult for other animators to acquire their own scenes to animate as Henn would typically do them himself. According to the Academy of Art University, Henn's work on Simba "further cemented his place in [animation] history".

Journalists reported that Simba's mane was based on how singer Jon Bon Jovi styled his hair during the 1980s. Simba spends 55% of his screen time as a cub, and the remaining 45% as an adult lion. At the time of the film's release, Simba had the most screen time of any Disney hero, appearing in 49.71% of the film (or 43 minutes and 51 seconds).

== Critical reception ==
Reception towards Simba has been generally mixed. The Christian Science Monitor's David Sterritt hailed him as "a superbly realized character". Owen Gleiberman of Entertainment Weekly described Simba as "marvelously expressive", to the point where he appears to be more human-like than Aladdin and The Little Mermaid's human characters. In a review for The Fresno Bee, author John Scalzi called Simba "the cutest little lion club you'd ever care to see", and film critic Roger Ebert described him as "cute" several times throughout his review of the film. Peter Travers of Rolling Stone and About.com's David Nusair were moved by Simba's relationship with Mufasa. James Berardinelli of ReelViews enjoyed that the film prioritizes Simba's personal growth over his romantic relationship with Nala, but found Broderick's performance "nondescript".

Some critics complimented Simba's design.

Vox described Simba as "the least compelling character in The Lion King", acknowledging this might be a controversial opinion. Hal Hinson of The Washington Post gave the character a negative review, questioning Simba as a hero and nicknaming him "the Lion Country incarnation of Fabio". Kenneth Turan of the Los Angeles Times said Simba was outshone by his sidekicks, describing him as "irritatingly callow". Joshua Starnes of ComingSoon.net panned Simba as a main character, describing him as the film's "weak link being both blandly designed and blandly performed". Acknowledging the character's Shakespearean roots, The Baltimore Sun's Stephen Hunter called Simba a less compelling version of Hamlet, Morris the Cat, and Sylvester the Cat. Hunter also found adult Simba to be even less interesting than young Simba, while film critic Gene Siskel found the character boring. Johnny Brayson of Bustle described Simba as "not as great as you remember" despite the character's popularity, criticizing his privileged upbringing, arrogance, and immaturity. Jonathan Allford of The Guardian called Simba "a happy, slightly dislikable lion cub". In 2022, Rachel Ulatowski of Screen Rant wrote that despite differing opinions about the character, "Audiences cannot deny that Simba's design perfectly embodies his role as the tragic hero" with "an intriguing appearance that is heroic, bold, charming, but also weary and disheveled at times. The contrasting elements paint him perfectly as an exiled prince who has been through tragedy in his life".

Despite the character's mixed reviews, several critics have praised Broderick's performance, including The Washington Post's Desson Howe. Annette Basile of FilmInk described Broderick as "excellent" in the role, while Peter Bradshaw of The Guardian called him "sumptuous". Digital Spy's Mayer Nissim described Broderick's work as "wonderful". Several critics and publications have ranked The Lion King among his best films and performances. According to the actor's biography on PBS, Broderick's work in the film and its sequels ironically delivered him "his greatest screen success (to date) in relative anonymity". Gold Derby said the film earned Broderick legions of younger fans, ranking it his sixth best film. MovieWeb ranked Simba the greatest performance of Thomas' career, praising his "wide range of emotions". However, Janet M. Walker of the New York Amsterdam News criticized Disney for casting white actors as Simba, considering his parents are voiced by Black actors James Earl Jones and Madge Sinclair. Christopher Null of Contactmusic.com panned Weaver's performance, likening his singing to Michael Jackson and saying "You almost don't want him to succeed".

When the film was released, some viewers alleged that during one of Simba's scenes, he creates a dust cloud that appears to spell the word "SEX" in the night sky. In a lawsuit filed against Disney in Texas, the studio was accused of including sexual subliminal messages in a family-oriented film, while Catholic activist organization American Life League demanded an apology for including sexual material in its films. Animator Tom Sito claims the letters actually spelled "SFX", an abbreviation for special effects, and was an easter egg animated by the film's special effects department. Beginning in 2002, the letters were edited out of re-releases of The Lion King, and replaced with standard dust clouds.

== Cultural impact ==
=== Legacy and popularity ===
According to a Vox writer, Simba is not as iconic as Scar or Mufasa, which they attributed to the character's perceived lack of agency and tendency to rely on instructions from other characters. Contrarily, Marc Snetiker of Entertainment Weekly described Simba as an iconic character who has "spent nearly a quarter century etched into pop culture". Chhavi Puri of Pinkvilla said characters such as Simba "defined our childhood". The same publication named Simba the second-best Disney character of all-time and "undoubtedly one of the best male Disney characters", while The A.V. Club ranked him 29th. According Toons Mag, Simba is one of the 10 best Disney cartoon characters of all time and "one of Disney's most significant characters". Looper ranked Simba Disney's 37th best character of all-time. Variety named Simba one of Disney's 25 most iconic characters. According to Arunkumar Sekhar of Cinema Express and Rachel Ulatowski of Screen Rant, Simba is one of the studio's most iconic animated characters. In a 1995 article ranking "The most powerful people in entertainment", Entertainment Weekly likened Disney chairman Michael Eisner's success story to that of Simba. Publications such as World Animal Protection, the Los Angeles Times, Wilmington Star-News, and the Birmingham Mail consider Simba to be one of the most famous lions in popular culture. Richard Fink of MovieWeb declared him "the most famous lion in all of cinema".

Charlotte Cripps of The Independent ranked Simba Disney's second best role-model for children. Comic Book Resources ranked Simba Disney's 12th most likeable prince character, due to his relatability. Collider ranked Simba The Lion King's fourth-best character, as well as the best protagonist of the Disney Renaissance. Contributor Tyler B. Searle said Simba "has one of the strongest character arcs of any Disney protagonist". Writing for the same publication, Anas Yamin said Simba has the best character development of all Disney main characters. Comic Book Resources ranked Simba eighth in their ranking, including him among "some of the most beloved and iconic main characters in animation history".

Simba's appearance has also generated online debates discussing whether it is appropriate for fans to consider the character attractive, because he is a cartoon lion. Several publications, such as Refinery 29, HuffPost, Seventeen, The Edge, YourTango, The Daily Edge, Pride, and Thought Catalog, included Simba in listicles about their most memorable "cartoon crushes", while Elle ranked him the fourth most attractive Disney prince. Polygon ranked Simba the sixth "hottest animated animal character", and Mashable ranked him eighth. Refinery29's Anne Cohen lamented that the 2019 remake lacks the "Hot Simba Energy" of the original film. Kayla Cobb of Decider theorized that Disney wanted audiences to know that "in the lion world, Simba is a babe" by drawing him with traditionally attractive and masculine features. Louis Costello, a writer for Pedestrian, said "yes it's okay to be attracted to adult Simba and yes you're not the only one". In 2019, the pop culture website Punkee published an article asking readers "Why Are We All So Thirsty For Simba?", which author Jenna Guillaume attributed to the character's long mane, smile, "flirty eyebrow raise", and Broderick's voice. Senior lecturer Dr. Lauren Rosewarne theorized that Simba's story and character development throughout The Lion King offers several opportunities for viewers to find him attractive, progressing from wounded, ostracized cub to “potentially offers a bad boy, and then the hero appeal that some audiences will be drawn to".

=== Pop culture references ===
During the film's opening song, "Circle of Life", Rafiki introduces a newborn Simba to a large crowd of onlooking animals gathered at the foot of Pride Rock by standing towards the edge and holding the cub high above their heads, while Mufasa and Sarabi observe from behind them. The scene is considered to be one of the most famous from The Lion King, and has been parodied in several projects since the film's release. Several fans have recreated the image using their own children or pets, including, controversially, singer Michael Jackson in 2002, and Brendan Fraser at the end of the film George of the Jungle. During the third season finale of Once Upon a Time, the main character Emma Swan asked her parents Snow White and David Nolan if they were going to hold up her yet unnamed baby brother like in The Lion King.

Since the release of The Lion King, the name "Simba" has increased in use and popularity among pet owners, specifically dogs and cats. According to Comcast in 2010, the use of Simba as a dog name reemerged in popularity in 2009 after experiencing a noticeable decline in 2001, ranking the name ninth out of 10 on its list of "Top 10 Trendiest Dog Names of the Year". In May 2013, Yahoo! Lifestyle included the name on its list of "Trendiest Dog Names". According to YouPet, Simba is the 17th most popular cat name out of 100 candidates. Care2 included Simba in its article "All-around Cool Cat Names," while DutchNews.nl reported that Simba ranks among the country's most popular cat names as of July 2013. In its list of "Top Popular Pet Names," BabyNames.com placed Simba at number 64 on its list of most popular dog names out of the 100 that were considered. Yahoo! News UK reported that Simba was one of the most popular pet names in Britain in 2016. Corresponding with the Lion King remake in 2019, Simba was that year's most popular male cat name. According to Daily Hive, Simba ranked among Toronto's 10 most popular dog names in 2021.

== In other media ==
Actors Donald Glover and JD McCrary voiced adult and young Simba, respectively, in the 2019 photorealistic remake of The Lion King. The remake closely adheres the plot and characters from the original, but devotes more time to exploring Simba's transition from lion cub to adult. Although the film had already been completed, Glover asked to rerecord his work after his own father died, claiming the experience strengthened his understanding of his character. To commemorate the remake's release, Funko Pop! released several vinyl figurines of Simba and other main characters from the film. Glover reprised his role in Mufasa: The Lion King, which coveys the story of Mufasa's origins and upbringing to Simba's daughter Kiara.

Simba makes several guest appearances on the animated television series The Lion King's Timon & Pumbaa. Beginning with the television special The Lion Guard: Return of the Roar, Simba guest appears on the animated series The Lion Guard, which mostly occurs during the timeline of The Lion King II: Simba's Pride's. It follows Simba and Nala's second-born cub, Kion, who becomes leader of the Lion Guard tasked with protecting the Pride Lands. Simba is voiced by Rob Lowe. The character was also featured as guest on the animated series House of Mouse, as well as its spin-off film Mickey's Magical Christmas: Snowed in at the House of Mouse.

Actors Scott Irby-Ranniar and Jason Raize played young and adult Simba, respectively, in the original Broadway cast of the stage adaptation of The Lion King. Raize auditioned after learning that director Julie Taymor was looking for ethnically ambiguous actors. Raize said the role was highly sought-after because the musical required more "triple-threat work" than other Broadway shows at the time, and immediately felt connected to Simba. Once cast, Raize found it challenging to maintain the character's duality because Simba is "both man and beast", without sacrificing one for the other. Although hundreds of child actors auditioned for the role of young Simba, the casting process was much less grueling for Irby-Ranniar who, according to Taymor, simply "walked in and he had the part". Both actors received positive reviews for their performances.

=== Merchandising and video games ===
As an part of the franchise's merchandising, Simba has appeared in various The Lion King-related products. The character's likeness has been used in and adapted into a variety of items, including plush toys and figurines, clothing, bedding, household decor, and appliances. The success of the stage musical has also led to its own line of merchandising, including the Simba beanbag doll, based on the character's appearance and costume in the Broadway show.

Simba has appeared as a playable character in several video games both directly and indirectly associated with the Lion King franchise. The character's first appearance as a video game character was in The Lion King (1994), which follows the plot of the original film and features Simba as both a cub and an adult. Simba appears in The Lion King: Simba's Mighty Adventure (2000), which encompasses 10 levels that incorporate the plot of both The Lion King and The Lion King II: Simba's Pride as "Simba ... matures from a precocious cub to an adult lion".

In the Kingdom Hearts video game franchise, Simba appears as a friend and ally of the series' main character, Sora, in Kingdom Hearts, Kingdom Hearts: Chain of Memories and Kingdom Hearts III, and as a companion in battle in Kingdom Hearts II. Simba also appears as a playable character in Disney Interactive Studios' Disney's Extreme Skate Adventure and Disney Magic Kingdoms. He is one of the central characters in Disney Friends and also appears as a villager in the life simulation adventure game Disney Dreamlight Valley.

=== Walt Disney Parks and Resorts ===
Live versions of Simba appear in the Lion King musical and in the parades and shows at the Walt Disney Parks and Resorts.

Simba was also the main character in "Legend of the Lion King," a former Fantasyland attraction in Walt Disney World's Magic Kingdom, which retold the story of the film using fully articulated puppets. Other Disney attractions that have featured Simba include the Mickey's PhilharMagic 3D show and the Hong Kong Disneyland version of It's a Small World.

He appeared as one of the main characters at Epcot's Land Pavilion 12-minute edutainment film Circle of Life: An Environmental Fable, until its closure in 2018. He currently appears in animatronic form in Festival of the Lion King at Disney's Animal Kingdom.
