= Jason Raize =

American actor and singer (1975–2004)

- Born: Jason Raize Rothenberg; July 20, 1975; Oneonta, New York, U.S
- Died: February 3, 2004 (aged 28); Yass, New South Wales, Australia
- Resting place: Mount Calvary Cemetery in Emmons, Otsego County, New York
- Occupations: Actor, singer and activist
- Years active: 1994–2004

Jason Raize Rothenberg (July 20, 1975 – February 3, 2004) was an American actor, singer, and former Goodwill Ambassador for the United Nations Environment Programme. He was best known for his roles as the adult Simba in the Broadway stage musical version of The Lion King and the voice of Denahi in the 2003 animated Disney film Brother Bear.

== Early life ==
Born Jason Raize Rothenberg in Oneonta, New York, he grew up in the Catskills in upstate New York and started acting as a teenager, when his stepmother enrolled him in a summer Shakespeare workshop. After moving with his father to Oneonta in high school, Raize performed in high school plays and with Oneonta's Orpheus Theatre. He moved to New York City and briefly attended the American Musical and Dramatic Academy.

== Career ==
In 1994, he dropped his given surname, "Rothenberg", and began using his middle name, "Raize," as his professional surname.

He performed at the Bucks County Playhouse in Oklahoma! (as Jess/Dream Curly), The King and I (as Lun Tha), Phantom (in the title role), and The Rocky Horror Show (as Rocky). His other regional credits include Gypsy: A Musical Fable, The Sound of Music and West Side Story.

At the age of 19, Raize succeeded Dennis DeYoung of Styx in the national tour of Jesus Christ Superstar, starring Ted Neeley and Carl Anderson. Next, he toured with Miss Saigon, and had been cast as a swing in a national tour of The King and I starring Hayley Mills when he decided to audition for Julie Taymor's upcoming Broadway production of The Lion King (1997).

Winning the role of "Simba" in The Lion King's original Broadway cast, Raize became part of one of the biggest Broadway hits of the 1990s. During his three years with The Lion King, Raize performed "Endless Night" and "He Lives in You" on The Rosie O'Donnell Show, and "Can You Feel the Love Tonight" on Good Morning America. He was also featured twice on the cover of InTheater magazine.

In September 1998, Raize appeared on The Paul Simon Album: Broadway Sings the Best of Paul Simon singing Simon & Garfunkel's "The Sound of Silence". The album also featured Christiane Noll, Jose Llana, Lauren Kennedy, Jane Krakowski, and Sal Viviano.

In May 1999, Raize co-produced a benefit for refugees from Kosovo at the Kit Kat Club. In October 1999, the United Nations Environment Programme appointed Raize a Goodwill Ambassador "for his commitment and dedication to furthering the cause of the environment through the use of his creative talents to inspire respect for our natural heritage and to promote the conservation and sustainable use of the earth's resources." In November 1999, he narrated the National Geographic nature documentary series Wild Africa: The Land of the Lion.

Raize signed a deal with Universal Records and released two singles ("Taste the Tears" and "You Win Again"), both produced by Desmond Child who had recently produced Ricky Martin's hit "Livin' la Vida Loca." In mid-2000, Raize and Jessica Simpson starred in a Disney Channel special called Jessica Simpson and Jason Raize in Concert. The concert was filmed in Disneyland and featured Raize's songs "I Can Make it Without You," "You Win Again," "Lovin' You Lovin' Me," "Run Away Girl," and "NYC." His debut CD on Universal was titled NYC, but it was not officially released.

Raize returned to the New York theater scene in January 2001 for a concert performance of Carmen Jones. He starred in the made-for-TV-movie The Kitchen which premiered on PBS in June 2001. Later, he starred in Keeping it Wild with Jason Raize, which premiered as a nationally syndicated program in which he visited exotic locations, such as Africa, Costa Rica and Australia to learn about animals in their natural habitats. The show was produced by Sue Ann Taylor of Blue Heron Films.

He also voiced Denahi in the 2003 Disney animated feature Brother Bear before his death.

== Death ==
In 2003, Raize moved to Australia without his family's knowledge to rethink his career path. Sarah MacArthur, his mother, said "[Jason] needed to step back and catch his breath. I don't think he had figured it out yet [what to do next]". He worked as a general hand at a stud farm in Yass, New South Wales called Hardwicke Stud, owned by Olympic gold medalist Lawrence Morgan. This was also a place where he had friends whom he met while filming there in 2001.

Raize was last seen alive at 10:30 am on February 2, 2004. A missing person's report was filed the following day, as his absence had made his friends increasingly concerned. Raize's body was found at 11:15 am on February 7. He had hanged himself in a shed on the property.

== Memorial and legacy ==
A public memorial service for Raize was held on April 8, 2004, at Broadway's New Amsterdam Theatre, where Raize had performed as Simba for almost three years. The service included speeches by Raize's sister, Lisa, and Disney Theatrical's Thomas Schumacher, a performance by Raize's former The Lion King co-star Heather Headley, a slide show and home movies from his younger days, clips of Raize performing in The Lion King, and a montage from his Keeping it Wild television series. The service ended with a traditional South African celebration of passing into the next world led by cast members of The Lion King. The Orpheus Theatre in Oneonta issued two annual Jason Rothenberg Raize Scholarships which underwrite tuition to the theater's summer music theater workshops for youths with financial need.
