= Sympathetic character =

A sympathetic character is a fictional character in a story whom the writer expects the reader to identify with and care about, if not admire. Protagonists, almost by definition, fit into the category of a sympathetic character; so, however, do many supporting characters and even antagonists.

== See also ==
- Hero
- Villain
