= List of Camp Lazlo characters =

Camp Lazlo is an American animated television series created by Joe Murray. It features a large cast of anthropomorphic animal characters. The series takes place in Camp Kidney, a boy scout summer camp in the fictional town of Prickly Pines.

The cartoon is set in a universe inhabited solely by anthropomorphic animals of many species and focuses on a trio of campers attending a poorly run summer camp known as Camp Kidney; the series focuses on three "bean scouts": Lazlo the eccentric, optimistic monkey, Raj the Indian elephant, and Clam the albino pygmy rhinoceros. Other characters include the Camp Kidney staff, including the ill-tempered Scoutmaster Lumpus and his mild-mannered assistant Slinkman the banana slug. The program also features Lazlo's assortment of fellow campers, characters from a rival summer camp attended solely by girls, and some of the odd locals of the town of Prickly Pines.

Lazlo won the award for "Best New Character" at the Pulcinella Awards in 2006.

== Creation ==
After the end of the production of Rocko's Modern Life, Murray kept a notebook of ideas for television shows and books. Murray attributes some of his most fond memories to days at summer camp; Murray said that he attended summer camp every summer for "4 or 5 years in a row" and that he "couldn't really get the scouting thing down". He also described cartoons with pastoral settings such as the Bugs Bunny cartoons of the Looney Tunes and Merrie Melodies series and Yogi Bear as having a "calming" effect due to the tree-filled backgrounds. At the time he believed that too many futuristic themes appeared in media and literature, so he wished to create a series that would "get back to nature." Camp Lazlo originated from a camp-related children's book series concept by Murray that, according to him, "outgrew its medium." As Murray developed the concept, he felt that his "lunatic characters wanted to live" and decided that a simple story could not sufficiently house his characters. Murray desired to create a series about a group of children without "high tech stimulus" and "in nature". Murray also cited the summer camp-themed cartoon series Camp Candy as an influence on the show's humor.

Linda Simensky, who had previously worked with Murray on Rocko, had since moved to Cartoon Network and called Murray to solicit a new series. After an initial hesitation, Murray sent Simensky the idea for a show with a working title of 3 Beans. Simensky "thought it sounded too much like a salad", so Murray changed the name to Camp Lazlo. When approval was given, Murray decided to produce the show at Cartoon Network Studios and brought Mark O'Hare on as co-producer.

Murray asked Tom Kenny to voice Scoutmaster Lumpus and Slinkman because Murray felt that Kenny "adds writing to his roles" and "brings so much." Murray looked for "comedic timing" in his voice actors, and therefore he used many stand-up comics and sketch actors.

== Main characters ==
=== Lazlo ===
Lazlo (voiced by Carlos Alazraqui) is the only son of his father who is an adventurous, chipper, optimistic, and quirky spider monkey. Often annoying Edward or Scoutmaster Lumpus, he is a very happy-go-lucky monkey. As a hippie, Lazlo loves peace. Lazlo has a really serious case of coulrophobia. Lazlo "goes where the wind blows" by his own statement.

Joe Murray, creator of Camp Lazlo, originally created Lazlo for a children's book concept. As he developed the concept, Murray believed that a children's book could not contain the stories and ideas, so he decided to create a television show. According to Murray, when he thought about Lazlo's personality, a spider monkey came to his mind.

Lazlo comes from São Paulo, Brazil. Murray wrote on his website that Lazlo's parents moved to the United States to start a fruit company, allowing Lazlo to learn English. Originally Murray wanted Lazlo to carry a strong Brazilian accent, but when Cartoon Network asked Murray to choose only one character to carry a strong accent, Murray opted for Raj and gave Lazlo an Americanized voice. Murray said that he did not plan for Alazraqui to voice Lazlo; according to him the arrangement simply occurred.

Lazlo stays in the Jelly Cabin with Raj and Clam; the three are called the "Jelly Cabin Trio."

The Cartoon Network press kit character descriptions describe Lazlo as "imaginative, freethinking," and a "natural-born non-conformist." The press kit states that Lazlo "enthusiastically spreads mischief and wacky shenanigans," uses "imagination and creativity" to solve problems, and vex Scoutmaster Lumpus with his "persistent happiness and optimism." The Hollywood Reporter reviewer Ray Richmond described Lazlo as "energetic." Science Fiction Weekly reporter Kathie Huddleston describes Lazlo as "optimistic" and "out to wreak as much good-natured havoc as he can." Common Sense Media reviewer Joly Herman, whose review is posted on Go.com, says that Lazlo possesses "innocent rebellious quality of a trickster" since "authority" is often his adversary, and that Lazlo does not "take him seriously," with "him" being Lumpus.

Murray says that he admires Lazlo's ability to "make the best of situations when things go against him." In an interview the interviewer inquired Murray about Lazlo's dislike of "structure." He also describes Lazlo as dealing with conflicts and issues "with imagination"; the Camp Lazlo creator said that in his own family he likes to use "imagination" when dealing with his real life conflicts.

=== Raj ===
Rajesh "Raj" (voiced by Jeff Bennett) is a cautious, timid Indian elephant who speaks with a distinct Indian accent. Born in India, Raj is one of Lazlo's bunkmates and best friends in the Jelly Bean Cabin at Camp Kidney and is seen spending most of his time with Lazlo and Clam; as said above, the three are collectively known as the "Jelly Trio." He is the smartest of the Jelly Beans. Raj has dreams of becoming a famous DJ.

The Raj character design appeared in many of Joe Murray's sketchbooks; the Raj design appeared as a character in "Family Pop," a web series written by Murray. When Murray created Camp Lazlo, he wanted one of the main characters to be Indian and decided that Raj would make a good choice. Murray thought about an Indian elephant and its personality, and "that's how we got Raj." When the network asked Murray to choose only one character for an accent, Murray chose Raj over Lazlo and gave him an Indian accent. Originally Murray created Raj with a massive overbite, creating a "spitty" noise; he decided to remove the trait as he felt it made the voice difficult to understand.

Cartoon Network's press kit described Raj as "reluctant, neurotic," and "often finds himself pulled into situation that he would rather avoid but goes along with Lazlo and Clam for fear of being left alone." Raj has allergies to bacon as revealed in "Lights Out" Season 1, Episode 3.

Raj's parents sent him to Camp Kidney because they believed that Raj needed "toughening up." The press kit says that he has several disorders, including a "cleaning compulsion," skin ruptures, and phobias of snakes and "bugs" and found "a philosophical home at Camp Kidney." Raj was terrified of water but has since gotten over his fear, becoming one of the stronger swimmers at camp, along with Lazlo and Clam. The kit states that Raj uses many "sayings" that "usually strike a point with his co-conspirators." Raj also owns an "extensive and dusty hi-fi" gramophone record collection.

The Hollywood Reporter reviewer Ray Richmond described Raj as "wise and neurotic." He is very organized with his blankets with days Mondays-Fridays as revealed in "Lights Out".

=== Clam ===
Clam (voiced by Carlos Alazraqui) is a small, taciturn albino white rhinoceros who is one of Lazlo's bunkmates and best friends. Despite being one of the main characters of the show, he rarely speaks in full sentences. He has a low voice and usually speaks in short bursts of few words, often repeating the last words that others say.

Murray said that he had "no idea where he came from." He said that he started drawing a character with rhinoceros horns and the form is "what he became." Originally Murray created Clam as a mute, but he decided that he preferred Clam to have a voice.

Cartoon Network's press kit describes Clam as an "eccentric musical and academic genius," "misunderstood," and "protective." The Hollywood Reporter reviewer Ray Richmond described Clam as "highly intelligent." In the episode "Prodigious Clamus", which by far portrayed the best examples of Clam's intelligence, he finished an entire puzzle by simply chewing it up in his mouth, painted Leonardo da Vinci's Mona Lisa (both of which were performed in under ten seconds), and, from blowing in an empty soda bottle, he coaxed a symphonic version of Beethoven's Ninth, complete with supporting chorus. Clam understands the operation of technology and machinery that other characters find "confusing." Clam eats cereal in order to obtain prizes from the cereal carton; most of the possessions he brings to camp consist of prizes from cereal boxes. Other episodes have shown he loves to eat pancakes and vegetables. He is also good friends with Squirrel Scout Nina Neckerly as seen in the episode "Step Clam".

=== Edward ===
Edward Platypus (voiced by Doug Lawrence) is a cynical and irritable duck-billed platypus with a New York accent and known for having a grudge against Lazlo, who also stays in the Pinto Cabin with Chip and Skip. He enjoys watching the suffering of others and is constantly coming up with schemes to spoil any fun that Lazlo and his pals might have. He has a severe hatred for Lazlo and Camp Kidney, though that has lessened over time. Murray described Edward as having "a serious negative attitude and no social skills." The official Cartoon Network press kit described Edward as "a stickler for rules" who hates "any scout who doesn't follow them." However, Edward has a rebellious streak and turns on Lumpus and Slinkman if he thinks he can get away with it. Murray described Edward as one of his and his crew's favorite characters to write for. Edward sometimes plots to ruin the Jelly Trio and its "freethinking ways," and the plans often fail. Even though his attitude and temperament suggest a tough guy, he has a secret soft side: the Barbie-like platypus doll named Veronica whom he hides from the other campers. "Movie Night" reveals that he's the youngest camper at Camp Kidney.

Of the campers, Edward is the only one to have his brothers appear. Murray said that the situation involving the brothers provided insight into Edward's neurosis.

=== Samson ===
Samson Clogmeyer (voiced by Jeff Bennett) is a nerdy yet likeable, bespectacled and accident-prone guinea pig who has been known to become injured multiple times throughout the cartoon, often by a volleyball flying in out of nowhere and knocking him to the ground, an occurrence used as a running gag throughout the series. He is reputated as the camp wimp and is often unintentionally ignored, yet is rather social, generally appearing and being involved with many other campers. Samson is usually seen with or alongside Edward, although Samson is sometimes bullied by him in the later seasons. It is also shown in the episode "S is for Crazy" that he was raised by jellyfish.

=== Chip and Skip ===
Chip and Skip Hopps (both voiced by Steve Little) are clueless, dirt loving identical dung beetle twin brothers. The official Cartoon Network press release described the two as confused by "their role in nature." Edward often asks them to assist him in his schemes, although Edward does get very annoyed at their antics.

The two are constantly being followed by a smelly dirt cloud and a large group of fruit flies that they obtained from Lazlo. On his website Murray commented, "I am sure that the overseas animators got tired of constantly including their ever-present flies into every shot." The features prevent the brothers from stealthily moving. The only way to tell each other apart is that Skip, the eldest twin, wears a badge sash and has a higher voice.

Murray encountered Little when he performed at The Groundlings in Los Angeles. Murray asked him if he was interested in being a voice actor and decided that Little matched the Dung Beetles.

=== Scoutmaster Lumpus ===
Scoutmaster Algonquin Casper Lumpus (voiced by Tom Kenny) is an irascible moose with a large ego. Lumpus refers to himself on the show as Algonquin C. Lumpus; however, the Cartoon Network press release refers to him as Scoutmaster Leonard Lumpus. Contrary to how his last name is spelt, it is pronounced as "Loom-pus", though most people seldom get it right.

Lumpus throws temper tantrums, complete with screaming, stomping and/or crying if his demands are not met. He wishes to become the Head Scoutmaster and feels disappointment with his current role. Lumpus has a crush on Squirrel Scout leader Ms. Jane Doe, who is oblivious to his constant attempts to take her on a date. Lumpus enjoys Doe's "Minnesota accent." Towards the end of Camp Lazlo, Lumpus marries Jane Doe (though in one episode he was already married to a migrating mulberry tree).

It was also revealed at the end of the series that Lumpus was not the official scoutmaster of Camp Kidney, but an imposter. The real scoutmaster manages to have Lumpus arrested and sent to a mental hospital/cell under a straitjacket. The real scoutmaster lied because he stated that Lumpus had locked him in the closet this summer, but Lumpus has been the scoutmaster for 5 years (though it turns out he got to be scoutmaster by buying fake badges) and that the real scoutmaster may be framing Lumpus. Also, in one of the episodes, it was revealed that Scoutmaster Lumpus was given the job from his dad from the Bean Tree, which was once owned by his grandfather. However, there's a contradiction in that episode for it said Lumpus' grandfather got Camp Kidney from a descendant of the camp's founder but another episode shows the founder as still alive and still owning Camp Kidney. Lumpus would've still had his job after being arrested, due to the conclusion in the episode "Dead Bean Drop" end credits, showing that Lumpus is still scoutmaster in the future, despite the dispute that he's not the real Scoutmaster. The real scoutmaster resembles both Scoutmaster Lumpus and Heffer Wolfe and is also voiced by Tom Kenny.

Murray originally created Lumpus as a horse, but changed the design to a moose when the design seemed more "mountain" [sic] to the Camp Lazlo creator. Murray experimented with voices, imagining (and later disliking) a "Don Knotts"-like voice. Murray described Kenny's voice as a "crazy mix of Richard Nixon and W. C. Fields." Murray stated that he enjoyed writing situations involving Lumpus as the character that had "no morals and zero conscience". It was revealed that in some episodes, Lumpus was a former Bean Scout from the same camp when he was a young kid. He is always in a bad mood and this horrible disposition could have been caused by his parents' failure to visit him at camp when he was a Bean Scout and tell him that they love him or even show any signs of care for him. It was seen in the episode "Slug Fest" that Lumpus does appreciate Slinkman. As Camp Lazlo episodes entered production, Slinkman, Lumpus's right-hand man, takes increasing control of the camp as Lumpus increasingly becomes mentally incapacitated. In a way to show difference between characters: Lumpus loves clowns and Lazlo hates clowns.

Kenny, during a recording, thought of a scenario involving Lumpus locking up the real scoutmaster (who resembles Heffer Wolfe from Rocko's Modern Life) into a closet. The real scoutmaster said that Lumpus locked him in the closet since the summer began. Murray decided to use the concept as a twist ending in the final episode, adding that the twist "tied up his character well."

The official Cartoon Network press kit describes Lumpus as a "frustrated" and "egomaniacal" individual who "needs to have his world in complete order". The Hollywood Reporter reviewer Ray Richmond described Lumpus as "thin-skinned". Common Sense Media reviewer Joly Herman, whose review is posted on Go.com, describes Lumpus as the "primary malignant, greedy character who yells at the campers and ends up getting his just desserts [sic] in the end" and characterizes his yelling as "frightening, even if Lazlo does not take him seriously".

=== Mr. Slinkman ===
Mr. Slinkman (voiced by Tom Kenny) is a smart, nice and friendly banana slug, who is Scoutmaster Lumpus' assistant and best friend. Like a real slug, Slinkman is an invertebrate. Kenny revealed that Slinkman was his favorite character that he voiced over. His first name is never mentioned.

Murray discovered banana slugs in the Santa Cruz Mountains when he attended summer camps as a child. Murray originally created Slinkman as Lumpus's "beaten-down" assistant with a voice intended to sound "like Dustin Hoffman's Rain man." [sic] Cartoon Network's press release states that Slinkman, who "has lots of social skills, and knows the Bean Scout manual cover-to-cover and can keep up with Lumpus’ busy schedule better than Lumpus himself" and operates the camp whenever Lumpus suffers from a meltdown, does not have "enough spine to stand up for himself." As episodes entered production, Slinkman gained increasing control over Camp Kidney as Lumpus became more mentally incapacitated. As a consequence, Slinkman's voice drifted away from the Rain Man voice towards a Christian Slater voice. Murray stated that Kaz placed an eye stalk gag involving Slinkman in all of the episodes that he wrote and storyboarded.

== Supporting characters ==
=== Dave and Ping Pong ===
David "Dave" Derryberry and Ping Pong Derryberry are two identical twin common loons, except that Ping Pong is taller. The two eat many "bugs" and indicate scenarios that can ruin any plan. Their last name is Loon. They get a bag of pretzels from their homeland, implied to be Canada, yearly. The two also run the camp newspaper "The Weekly Bean." Both are sarcastic towards Edward, although Dave is a little more innocent than Ping Pong is.

Mr. Lawrence voices both Dave and Ping Pong.

=== Larry, Louie, Leonard, and Liniment ===
Lawrence "Larry" Lemmingberg, Louis "Louie" Lemmingberg, Leonard Lemmingberg, and Liniment Lemmingberg are quadruplet brothers that are teal-colored and black-eyed Norway lemmings. A Cartoon Network press kit gives the brothers the names Larry, Louie, Leonard, and Liniment.

All four of their voices are done by Steve Little.

=== Patsy Smiles ===
Patricia "Patsy" Smiles is an adventurous, skillful and upbeat yellow mongoose with pink hair. She has a massive crush on Lazlo, and throughout the series she tries to impress him, like when she pushed him off a giant pinecone with her love, lied about being a snake-hunter, and gave him a valentine card. She is Commander Hoo-Ha's daughter, which is weird since she's a mongoose. In an interview Murray said that Patsy's affection causes Lazlo to feel "little freaked out" and that "she scares him." He describes Patsy as "a little more aggressive with Lazlo than he would ever reciprocate". Even though her affection causes Lazlo to feel uncomfortable, Lazlo probably has a secret crush on her." In "Spacemates", it's revealed that Patsy and Lazlo are soulmates, meaning they will be together in the future. Patsy is voiced by Jodi Benson.

=== Nina Neckerly ===
Nina Neckerly is a scholarly, geeky and neat Masai giraffe with orange hair who is best friends with Patsy and Gretchen. The press release describes Nina as "gangly" and "bookish." She is a fan of science-fiction and loves reading comic books about aliens, and also dreams of being able to go into space. In "Spacemates", her soul mates are revealed to be Chip and Skip. Her "knowledge" hides that she is a dork. She also gets along with Clam very well. Nina is voiced by Jill Talley.

=== Gretchen Laurence ===
Gretchen Laurence is an aggressive, tough and tomboyish alligator, with long blonde hair and has a grudge on the Bean Scouts. The official Cartoon Network press kit describes her as "ever-hungry" and desiring to eat "everyone, especially happy monkeys." She was said to have a crush on Edward in the episode "Squirrel Seats." In some episodes, she has a crush on Clam. Gretchen is voiced by Jill Talley.

=== Ms. Doe ===
Ms. Jane Doe is a female, blonde-haired red deer and the scoutmaster of the Squirrel Scouts, assisted by Ms. Mucus in leading the scout troop. Throughout the series, Scoutmaster Lumpus has held a strong infatuation for Jane and yearned for her affections in basically any episode where she appears alongside him with the exception of the episode of her debut, where she and the Squirrel Scouts enjoyed a successful, hassle-free fishing trip in a motorboat, much to Lumpus's envy. Ms. Doe is presumably from Minnesota because of her accent, in "Wedding Bell Blues" she and Lumpus get married, but possibly because of the reveal that he was a imposter at the final episode, she filed a divorce due to his false identity. Jane is voiced by Jodi Benson.

=== Ms. Mucus ===
Ms. Rubella Mucus is a common warthog who is Jane's assistant. The Cartoon Network press kit describes her as bearing a "gruff, prison guard attitude." She had been a soldier for 15 years. She hates the Bean Scouts with a passion, viewing them as "bitter, dim, and crude", and tries to teach the Squirrel Scouts to despise them as well (in multiple episodes, she has the girls fire watermelons at any Bean Scouts who try to cross the lake to their side). She even once tried to have Camp Kidney shut down permanently. Ms. Mucus is voiced by Jill Talley.

=== Commander Hoo-Ha ===
Commander Hoo-Ha Smiles is an American bison who is the commandant of the scouts of Prickley Pines. He is in charge of both Camp Kidney and Acorn Flats, and possibly Tomato Camp as well. His daughter is Patsy Smiles, a member of the Squirrel Scouts. He's so protective of her that, when he figured out she likes one of the Bean Scouts (by finding a valentine card she wrote), he ordered her to beat all of them so he could figure out which one she likes when she hesitates to beat him. When it was Lazlo's turn to be beaten, she said the card was for her father and Commander Hoo-Ha believed it. Hoo-Ha's mannerism are comparable to a stereotypical marine, particularly R. Lee Ermey's acting in the film Full Metal Jacket. His name is based on a variation of a common affirmation/cheer in the United States Marine Corps. Hoo-Ha is also charged, aside from being commandant to the Bean Scouts, with selecting scouts to move up to the next camp: the Tomato Scouts, which are portrayed (in slides in their only appearance) as brutal, militaristic, sadistic, and he has muscles from Valentine's day. He once considered moving Edward up to the Tomato Scouts but changed his mind when he saw Edward shedding a tear. It seems that throughout the series, Lazlo seems to be his favorite scout of Camp Kidney. The character went through two designs over the course of the series. He is voiced by Jeff Bennett.

=== Chef McMuesli ===
Chef Heimlich McMuesli is Camp Kidney's domestic goat cook. Originally Murray created McMuesli as the camp deacon; Cartoon Network discouraged religious elements, so McMuesli became the cook. McMuesli's name is based on Muesli, a health food, and this in turn references his cooking choices. Most of his food sits on the eccentric end of the health food menu, almost always including tofu and other vegan ingredients. He seems somewhat oblivious to the fact that campers hate his cooking and considers serving them "normal" camp food to be a punishment. McMuesli is voiced by Carlos Alazraqui.

=== Nurse Leslie ===
Nurse Douglas Leslie is a male pink nurse shark and is Camp Kidney's nurse. Murray created Leslie when the episode "Parasitic Pal" required the role of a nurse. O'Hare created the trait involving Leslie sitting in his stool at all times to the point where his leg muscles had atrophied; when Leslie tries to stand on his feet, his legs crumble. O'Hare reasoned that, in Murray's words, "that doctors never seem to get up from their stools. Only scoots himself around the examining room." He is voiced by Mr. Lawrence.

== Other characters ==
=== Pierre and No-Neck ===
Pierre and No-Neck are two strict river otter lifeguards with thick French accents. Pierre is voiced by Jeff Bennett and No-Neck is voiced by Carlos Alazraqui.

=== Harold ===
Harold Chan is a Pacific walrus that is a background character, but associated in more episodes than the other background characters. He talks almost as if he has a retainer. In the episode "Radio Free Edward", he does a show called "Freddie's Night Train". In "Harold and Raj", Harold got sick of always being in the background and decided to do something about it. He tries to impress Raj, much to Raj's extreme annoyance, after Harold tries copy Raj. Raj tells him to "Don't call, don't write, don't drop by unexpectedly". This sends Harold into a bitter depression. Once Raj relents, we learn that Harold always wanted to be a super hero named "Captain Banana Pants". Even though his real name is not Harold, he doesn't seem to mind, as all of the "cool guys" call him Harold, but he never does tell us his real name. He's voiced by Jeff Bennett.

=== Almondine Nestelle ===
Almondine Nestelle is a horned owl who is the most prominent of the recurring Squirrel Scouts. She wears glasses and is shown to be a fan of the "Rock Buckskin Fan Club" in the episode "Seven Deadly Sandwiches". She's voiced by Jodi Benson.

=== Mayor McPucker ===
Mayor Pothole McPucker is the hideous domestic pig mayor of Prickly Pines who frequently burps and farts. This character was thought up by J. G. Quintel, who later created Regular Show. He's voiced by Steve Little.

=== Heffer Wolfe ===
The Real Scoutmaster of Camp Kidney is a one-time character of Camp Lazlo who made his debut in the final episode of Camp Lazlo, "Lumpus's Last Stand". It was revealed that Scoutmaster Lumpus was an impostor all along who locked up the real scoutmaster in the closet the whole series, stole his job, and fooled everyone into thinking that he was the real scoutmaster of Camp Kidney. Lumpus was finally arrested and taken away to a mental asylum under a strapjacket, vowing revenge on the steer, but Lazlo still thought it was a great summer.

The real scoutmaster is indicated to be a shaved and elderly version of a character from Rocko's Modern Life, Heffer Wolfe, given their similar appearances, insistence on being called a steer rather than a cow, and sharing the same voice actor in Tom Kenny. The character was designed to be Heffer himself and the scene featuring said design was already animated, but due to Nickelodeon and Cartoon Network's rivalry, Murray was forced to change his design to be legally distinct.
