= Kinto Tamura =

Japanese actor and voice actor

Kinto Tamura (田村錦人, Tamura Kinto; September 29, 1928 – December 30, 2015) was a Japanese actor and voice actor from Tokyo Prefecture and affiliated with Gekidan Bunkaza.

== Roles ==
=== Television animation ===
- Dog of Flanders (Bertrand)
- Kamui the Ninja (Hansuke)
- Kimba the White Lion (Coco)
- Like the Clouds, Like the Wind (Sumito-sensei)
- Norakuro (Bernard)
- Ranma ½ Nettōhen (Chingensai)
- Time Bokan (Emperor)
- Andersen Monogatari (Painter, Father, Sea Lion)

=== OVA ===
- Sakura Wars: Ouka Kenran (Kenjiji)

=== Dubbing roles ===
- 12 Angry Men (2003 NHK edition) (Juror #9 (Hume Cronyn))
- Harry Potter film series (Filius Flitwick (Warwick Davis))
- Indiana Jones and the Temple of Doom (Shaman (D. R. Nanayakkara))
- Remo Williams: The Adventure Begins (Master Chiun (Joel Grey))
- Return of the Jedi (TV edition) (Admiral Ackbar (Tim Rose))
