= Yahoo News Underground =

Yahoo! News feature series

Yahoo! News Underground was a regular Yahoo! News feature series that explored fringe culture in America with reporting brought to life with original songs and music. It was a site dedicated "to subcultures, pastimes, passionate pursuits and pursuers of passion," according to the show's creator and host, Brad Miskell. The series included produced video, photo and written reportage, and made in-roads in the social media space with user generated content and interaction. The site and its content was part of Yahoo! News' move into original content that, at the time, included programming such as Kevin Sites in the Hot Zone and People of the Web.

The series premiered on April 1, 2007, leading one journalist to wonder if Underground was an April Fools prank. A ZDNet journalist wrote, "Yahoo gets it, big time" while commenting on the search for the holy grail of user generated content.

Underground features included coverage of:

- Sci-fi fandom
- Import scene tuners and drifters
- Gay rodeo
- Tribute bands, including Thai Elvis, Mini-Kiss, and Led Zepplica
- Graffiti and graff artists
- Krumping, the expressive street dance phenomenon, along with clown dancing progenitor Tommy the Clown
- Art cars and culture
- Amateur rocketry enthusiasts
- Bollywood dance troupe competitions

The series was canceled later in 2007 though Yahoo News left the site (http://underground.yahoo.com) online for more than a year following its cancellation.
