= Kimba the White Lion =

Japanese manga series and media franchise

- Artwork from the Kimba the White Lion - Ultra Edition DVD Set

ジャングル大帝 (Janguru Taitei)
- Manga
- Written by: Osamu Tezuka
- Published by: Gakudosha; Kobunsha; Kodansha
- English publisher: JP: Jippi English Comics (bilingual)
- Magazine: Manga Shōnen
- Original run: November 1950 – April 1954
- Volumes: 3
- Anime television series
- Directed by: Eiichi Yamamoto
- Music by: Isao Tomita
- Studio: Mushi Production
- Licensed by: NA: Nozomi Entertainment
- Original network: Fuji TV
- English network: AU: ABC; UK: Cartoon Network; US: NBC
- Original run: October 6, 1965 – September 28, 1966
- Episodes: 52
- Anime film
- Directed by: Eiichi Yamamoto
- Studio: Mushi Production
- Released: July 31, 1966
- Runtime: 74 minutes
- Anime television series
- Leo the Lion
- Anime television series
- The New Adventures of Kimba The White Lion
- Original video animation

Jungle Emperor Leo: Symphonic Poem
- Directed by: Toshio Hirata
- Music by: Isao Tomita
- Studio: Madhouse; Tezuka Productions
- Released: 1991
- Runtime: 51 minutes
- Anime film
- Jungle Emperor Leo
- Anime film

Jungle Emperor Leo: Hon-o-ji
- Directed by: Fumihiro Yoshimura
- Produced by: Minoru Kubota
- Written by: Mayumi Morita
- Studio: Beijing Sharaku Art; Media.Vision
- Released: March 18, 2000
- Runtime: 9 minutes
- Anime television film

Jungle Taitei: Yūki ga Mirai o Kaeru
- Directed by: Gorō Taniguchi
- Written by: Osamu Suzuki
- Music by: Takefumi Haketa
- Studio: Tezuka Productions
- Licensed by: NA: Discotek Media; SEA: Muse Communication
- Original network: FNS (Fuji TV)
- Released: September 5, 2009
- Runtime: 96 minutes

Kimba the White Lion, known in Japan as Jungle Emperor (Japanese: ジャングル大帝, Hepburn: Janguru Taitei), is a Japanese manga series written and illustrated by Osamu Tezuka, serialized in Manga Shōnen from November 1950 to April 1954. An anime based on the manga was created by Mushi Production and was broadcast on Fuji Television from 1965 to 1967, the first Japanese color animated television series. It began airing in North America from 1966. The later series was produced by Tezuka Productions.

A TV special premiered September 5, 2009, on Fuji TV. Produced in commemoration of Fuji TV's 50th anniversary, it was directed by Gorō Taniguchi, written by novelist and drama writer Osamu Suzuki, and features character designs by illustrator Yoshitaka Amano.

== Plot ==
In Africa during the mid-20th century, as humankind encroaches, the white lion Panja (パンジャ; Caesar in the English dub) gives the jungle's wild animals a safe haven. However, he angers nearby villagers by stealing their cattle and their food to feed the jungle carnivores (in the English dub he merely frees the cattle). A professional hunter, Ham Egg (Viper Snakely in the English dub), is called in to stop these raids. He avoids directly attacking Panja. Instead, he records the sounds of Panja and uses them to trap his pregnant mate, Eliza (エライザ, Eraiza), who then becomes bait in a trap for Panja. Panja is killed for his hide (but not before asking Eliza to name their child Kimba) and Eliza is put on a ship, destined for a zoo.

Kimba (レオ, Reo; "Leo" in Japanese (Note: The name Kimba was adopted after Simba, meaning "lion" in Swahili was first suggested, according to Fred Ladd. The name "Leo" needed to be changed because it coincided with the name of the MGM lion.)) is born on the ship. Eliza teaches him his father's ideals. As a huge tropical storm nears, she urges her cub out through the bars of her cage. The storm wrecks the ship, and Kimba starts to drown in the ocean. The fish help him learn to swim. As he begins to despair, the stars in the sky form the face of his mother, who encourages him. Guided by butterflies, he makes it to land.

Kimba lands far from his ancestral home and is found and cared for by humans. He learns the advantages of human culture and decides that when he returns to his wild home, he will bring culture to the jungle and stand for peace like his father.

The show follows Kimba's life after he returns to the wild, still a young cub, and how he learns and grows in the next year. Kimba soon learns that only communication and mutual understanding between animals and humans will bring true peace.

== Media ==
=== Manga ===
In 1950, the original Jungle Emperor story started in Manga Shōnen (Comic Boy) magazine.

The first manga volume has been released bilingually (Japanese-English) as Jungle Emperor Leo – Leo Edition.

=== Anime ===
==== 1965 series ====
Kimba, as he appears in Kimba the White Lion (1965)

The animated series was first broadcast in Japan on Fuji Television from October 6, 1965, to September 28, 1966. It was the first color TV anime series. Six months earlier the color anime Dorufin ōji had been broadcast on the same network, but since it was an experimental project that was cancelled after only 3 episodes, Jungle Emperor is generally considered the first official color anime series.

Other than the original broadcast in Japan in 1965, the series has been broadcast in many countries around the world.

In Asia, it was broadcast in Indonesia on Lativi, antv and SCTV (1995–96); in Iran on Channel 1; in the Philippines on ABC 5; in Saudi Arabia on Saudi TV and in Sri Lanka on ART TV.

In Europe, it was broadcast in Bosnia and Herzegovina on RTVUSK; in Croatia on ATV Split/TV Jadran, Nezavisna televizija (NeT), TV Nova Pula and Gradska TV Zadar; in Germany 1977 in ZDF; in France on ORTF (1972) and on TF1; in Italy first in syndication from 1977 and lately on Italia 1 (in 1999 and 2003 with the title Una giungla di avventure per Kimba [literally "a jungle of adventures for Kimba"]) and Boing (2010) and in Spain on TV3.

In North America, it was broadcast in Canada on Knowledge; in Mexico on Boomerang. It was broadcast, with English-dubbed voices, in the United States and other English-speaking markets, beginning on September 11, 1966. It was first commissioned for U.S. development by NBC Enterprises (now CBS Television Distribution) and adapted by Fred Ladd, for syndicated broadcast, with Kimba voiced by Billie Lou Watt. In 2005 the original 1965 dub of Kimba the White Lion was released as an 11-disc DVD set by Madman Anime of Australia and Right Stuf International of the U.S. It was a best seller. The series was re-dubbed into English in 1993, featuring the voice of Yvonne Murray as Kimba and having a new opening, with an all new soundtrack composed by Paul J. Zaza. In 2012 Right Stuf, Inc. releases "Kimba the White Lion: The Complete Series" 10 DVD box set of the original 1965 series. It was broadcast several times in the United States: on KHJ-TV (1965–1967; Billie Lou Watt dub), on NBC (1965–1977, re-runs until 1980; Billie Lou Watt dub), on syndication (1965–1977; Billie Lou Watt dub; 1993, re-runs until 1995; Yvonne Murray dub), on Kids & Teens TV (1993 re-runs; 2005–2009) and on Inspiration Life TV (1993 re-runs; 2005–2009).

In Oceania, it was broadcast in Australia on ABC, 31 Brisbane and Access 31 and on the NZBC in New Zealand.

==== 1966 film ====
The theatrical version of Jungle Emperor, directed by Eiichi Yamamoto, was released in Japan on July 31, 1966.

==== 1966 series ====
A sequel series, Jungle Taitei: Susume Leo! (Jungle Emperor: Onward, Leo!) first aired in Japan on Fuji Television from October 5, 1966, to March 29, 1967, featuring Leo (Kimba) as an adult. It aired in the United States in 1984 as Leo the Lion on CBN Cable Network.

==== 1989 series ====
In 1989, Dr. Osamu Tezuka died at age 60 on February 9. A remake of Jungle Emperor, The New Adventures of Kimba The White Lion was broadcast in Japan from October 12, 1989, to October 11, 1990. This series bears little resemblance to the original manga or the first TV series, as the plot is extremely different and the characters have been completely reworked and changed. Several heavily edited episodes of the series were dubbed into English and released directly to video in 1998 under the name: The New Adventures of Kimba the White Lion, by Pioneer Family Entertainment. It features the voice of Brad Swaile as Kimba.

==== 1991 OVA film ====
In 1991, an original video animation film was created, using the Symphonic Poem for its audio.

==== 1997 film ====
A new Jungle Taitei theatrical film, Jungle Emperor Leo, was released in Japan on August 1, 1997. Directed by Hiro Takeuchi, it is based on the second half of Dr. Tezuka's original manga story; it is not entirely faithful, however. It was dubbed into English and released on DVD in 2003 under the name Jungle Emperor Leo by Anime Works. The film was later released on Blu-ray and DVD by Discotek. In 1997, Julian Grant the head of the Fant-Asia film festival received a Cease-and-Desist from the Disney company to attempt to keep the Jungle Emperor Leo film from showing at the festival. Despite the order, the film screened to a full house. However, this is the last North American screening the film would ever receive.

The film had a distribution income of ¥430 million ($5.39 million) at the Japanese box office in 1997.

==== 2000 short film ====
A 9-minute anime short was released in Japan on March 18, 2000, titled Jungle Emperor Leo: Hon-o-ji. It was shown at a theater at Tezuka Osamu World in Kyoto.

==== 2009 television film ====
A television film, Jungle Taitei – Yūki ga Mirai o Kaeru (ジャングル大帝 勇気が未来をかえる), aired in Japan on September 5, 2009, with a completely new story, different from both the previous TV shows and the original manga. The setting was an artificially created jungle in 20XX Earth. In this movie, Panja and his mate, Eliza, are still alive; Coco is an unspecified female bird; and Sylvester, the black panther, serves as an antagonist until he changes his ways when a young boy mends his leg.

In 2019, the Japan Foundation produced an English dub of the film which was released on RetroCrush in July 2020.

An earlier English dub of the film premiered on Cartoon Network in the Philippines on November 19, 2010.

=== Other media ===
The music video for the song "A Boy" by Leo Ieiri, which has an animated part made by Tezuka Productions, features an anime version of the singer (based on Kimba and modeled after the singer) which meets other characters from the Kimba the White Lion series.

Jungle Emperor (ジャングル大帝 Jungle Taitei) is a cancelled 1990 eight-bit platform action game that was in development by Taito for the Family Computer, based on the popular manga/anime of the same name (aka Kimba the White Lion) by Osamu Tezuka. Not much is known about this game, except that it was going to be released in November 1990, but it was cancelled for unknown reasons. There were also plans for the unreleased Nintendo 64. A Jungle Emperor/Kimba the White Lion N64 game titled Emperor of the Jungle was going to be made for the magnetic disk drive peripheral, but was also cancelled. The only known evidence of its existence is a short video clip from Nintendo Space World. It was going to be an action-adventure game with vast exploration, but no information regarding the plot of the game currently exists. The game had its first on-video appearance at the 1996 Tokyo Shoshinkai Show, after which the release date of Spring 1999 was announced. A few scenes from the game were shown shortly after. Later that year in an interview at E3 1998, Shigeru Miyamoto mentioned that the project is in a bit of trouble and may take longer to complete than originally expected, due to inexperience. Its cancellation was announced soon after.

Jungle Emperor characters have cameos in the GBA game Astro Boy: Omega Factor, as well as a chapter from the Black Jack manga and Naoki Urasawa's Pluto.

In the sixth episode of Season 2 of the Fox TV series Fringe, Earthling, Kimba had a cameo in one of the episodes.

== Music ==
The series uses several themes. The 1966 Japanese version uses an opening theme and a closing theme. The opening is called "Jungle-Taitei" (ジャングル大帝, Janguru-Taitei; "Jungle Emperor"). The end song is "Leo no Uta" (レオのうた, Reo no Uta; "Leo's Song"). For the Japanese remake, the opening song is "Savanna o Koete" (サバンナを越えて, Sabanna o Koete; "Past the Savanna") sung by Ichiro Mizuki, and the ending is "Yūbae ni Nare" (夕映えになれ) sung by Tomoko Tokugai.

The American theme was written by Bernie Baum, Bill Giant and Florence Kaye and sung by Bill Giant. The opening song for the sequel series is "Go Ahead Onward Leo!" written by Isao Tomita and sung by Mieko Hirota. The US-English theme song known as "Leo the Lion" was written by Mark Boccaccio and Susan Brunet of Miami, Florida's SONIC-Sound International Corporation in 1984. Jungle Emperor Symphonic Poem (by Isao Tomita) was released on LP in 1966.

== Claims of resemblance to The Lion King ==
Screenshot from an early presentation reel of "King of the Jungle" that would later become The Lion King which shows a white lion cub and a butterfly

After the 1994 release of Disney's animated feature film The Lion King, it was suggested by some that there were similarities in characters, plotlines, sequences and events in the story resembling those of Kimba. Fred Ladd, the English-language producer, referred to the parallels as "stunning". Similarities in visual sequences have also been noted, most comprehensively by animation historian Fred Patten who published an essay on the subject. Patten would later go on to say that allegations that The Lion King was "simply [an] imitation" of Kimba were "not true", and that many fans who had not seen the show since childhood—or at all—had "exaggerated the similarities". Matthew Broderick, the voice actor for the adult Simba, recalled in an interview back in 1994 that he once believed that he was cast in a project about Kimba, bringing up memories of watching the series as a child.

Upon the release of The Lion King in Japan, multiple Japanese cartoonists signed a letter urging The Walt Disney Company to acknowledge due credit to The Jungle Emperor in the making of The Lion King. 488 Japanese cartoonists and animators signed the petition, which drew a protest in Japan, where Tezuka and Kimba are cultural icons.

Addressing alleged similarities between characters, The Lion King director Roger Allers stated it was "not unusual to have characters like a baboon, a bird, or hyenas" in films set in Africa. Additionally, the word simba is simply the Swahili word for 'lion', which Fred Ladd acknowledges could account for the similarly named protagonists; in fact, Leo (the protagonist's original name) was initially going to be changed in the English dub to "Simba", but an NBC executive changed the protagonist's name to Kimba during development. According to Ladd, this was because the executive found Simba "too common", which would make it difficult to maintain rights over the character's name.

Tezuka's family and Tezuka Productions have never pursued litigation against The Walt Disney Company for copyright infringement. Yoshihiro Shimizu, the company's director, stated that many of their employees saw resemblances between the two properties, but "any similarities in their plots are based in the facts of nature and therefore are two different works". In his book, Makoto Tezuka states that the controversy started in America and people inflated the issue because of their opposition to Disney's business practices. He also states that he refuses to participate in this denunciation of Disney and that he does not want to see his father's works being turned into a weapon for those people. Tezuka acknowledges that Kimba and The Lion King are two different stories with different themes, but if the latter was about a white lion who spoke with humans, then he would not be able to pardon the similarities.

== Reception ==
In 1967, the Jungle Emperor theatrical feature was awarded the St. Mark's Lion Award at the 19th International Children's Film Festival, which ran alongside the 28th Venice International Film Festival.

== Commercial use ==
In 1978, the adult Leo character, designed by Tezuka himself, became the mascot for the Seibu Lions (current Saitama Seibu Lions) baseball team, along with his sister Lina who was created for the baseball team. The Leo mascot was used on the team baseball cap and helmet for decades Leo also appeared on the players' uniform for the 2014 season, designed by Tezuka Productions. The Seibu conglomerate-owned team's mascot became highly visible throughout Japan on baseball caps, shirts, etc., as well as being heavily used in advertisement especially in the Tokyo area. Frederick L. Schodt makes the argument that by the 1980s, Leo the lion could hardly escape the notice of foreign visitors to the city.

Image from the Jungle Emperor manga appears on shirts made by Lacoste in cooperation with Tezuka Productions for their "Lacoste Live" capsule collection "Tezuka Collection", edition Fall/Winter 2013/2014.

== See also ==
- List of Osamu Tezuka anime
- List of Osamu Tezuka manga
- Osamu Tezuka's Star System
- Atlantis: The Lost Empire and Nadia: The Secret of Blue Water controversy, a similar plagiarism controversy
