= Kazuo Kumakura =

Japanese actor and theatre director

- 熊倉 一雄
- Born: January 30, 1927; Minato, Tokyo, Japan
- Died: October 12, 2015 (aged 88); Tokyo, Japan
- Occupations: Actor, voice actor, theatre director
- Years active: 1949–2015
- Organization: Theatre Echo
- Notable credit(s): Japanese voice of Alfred Hitchcock and Hercule Poirot

Kazuo Kumakura (熊倉 一雄, Kumakura Kazuo; January 30, 1927 – October 12, 2015) was a Japanese actor, voice actor, and theatre director. He was the head of the Theatre Echo agency at the time of his death.

== Biography ==
Kazuo Kumakura was born in the Azabu district of Minato, Tokyo on January 30, 1927. In 1956, he joined the Theatre Echo theatre group. From 1957, he became the Japanese voice of Alfred Hitchcock in Nippon TV's TV broadcasts of Alfred Hitchcock Presents, and from 1989, he played the voice of Hercule Poirot in Agatha Christie's Poirot.

He died of rectal cancer on October 12, 2015, at a hospital in Tokyo, at the age of 88.

== Filmography ==
=== Puppet show ===
- Hyokkori Hyoutanjima (1964) (Torahige)

=== Television animation ===
- Kimba the White Lion (1965) (Bo)
- Super Jetter (1965) (Matabee Saigou)
- Marine Boy (1969) (Doctor Akkeran)
- The Ultraman (1979) (Professor Henry Nishiki)
- Astro Boy (1980) (Higeoyaji)
- Reign: The Conqueror (1999) (Diogenes of Sinope)
- Monster (2004) (The Baby)

=== Theatrical animation ===
- Jack and the Witch (1967) (Bear cub)
- The Wonderful World of Puss 'n Boots (1969) (Boss Mouse)
- Panda! Go, Panda! (1972) (Papanda)
- The Rainy-Day Circus (1973) (Papanda)
- The Great Adventures of Kikansha Yaemon D51 (1974) (Yaemon)
- Phoenix 2772 (1980) (Doctor Saruta)
- Doraemon: Nobita and the Steel Troops (1986) (Doctor)
- Royal Space Force: The Wings of Honneamise (1987) (Prince Toness)
- Bonobono (1993) (Kuzuri-kun's father)

=== Video games ===
- Kingdom Hearts (2002) (Mister Smee, Geppetto)
- GeGeGe no Kitarō: Ibun Yōkai Kitan (2003) (Medama Oyaji)
- Kingdom Hearts II (2005) (Cogsworth)
- Kingdom Hearts Birth by Sleep (2010) (Mister Smee, Doc)
- Kingdom Hearts 3D: Dream Drop Distance (2012) (Geppetto)

=== Dubbing roles ===
==== Live-action ====
- Alfred Hitchcock Presents (Alfred Hitchcock)
- Agatha Christie's Poirot (Hercule Poirot (David Suchet))
- The Elephant Man (Bytes (Freddie Jones))
- Hart to Hart (Max (Lionel Stander))
- Lost in Space (Doctor Zachary Smith (Jonathan Harris))
- The Wizard of Oz (NHK edition) (Professor Marvel, The Doorman, The Cabby, The Guard, The Wizard of Oz (Frank Morgan))

==== Puppet show ====
- Fraggle Rock (Cantus)
- The Muppet Show (Gonzo the Great)
- Stingray (King Titan of Titanica)

==== Animation ====
- Alice in Wonderland (The Mad Hatter)
- The Aristocats (Scat Cat)
- Bambi (Friend Owl)
- Bambi II (Friend Owl)
- Beauty and the Beast (Cogsworth)
- Beauty and the Beast: The Enchanted Christmas (Cogsworth)
- Belle's Magical World (Cogsworth)
- The Black Cauldron (Dallben)
- Disney's Christmas Carol (Mister Fezziwig & Old Joe)
- The Fox and the Hound (Boomer the Woodpecker)
- Fun and Fancy Free (Jiminy Cricket, Willie the Giant)
- Lady and the Tramp (Tony)
- Lady and the Tramp II: Scamp's Adventure (Tony)
- One Hundred and One Dalmatians (Jasper)
- Peter Pan (Buena Vista edition) (Mister Smee)
- Pinocchio (Geppetto)
- Popeye (Bluto)
- Return to Never Land (Mister Smee)
- Scooby-Doo (Scooby-Doo)
- Snow White and the Seven Dwarfs (Doc)
- SWAT Kats: The Radical Squadron (Dark Kat)
- The Magic Voyage (Christopher Columbus)

=== Japanese Voiceover ===
- Peter Pan's Flight (Mr. Smee)
- Snow White's Adventures (Doc)
- E.T. Adventure (Monster James)
- The Amazing Adventure of Spider-Man the Ride (Truck driver)

=== Radio ===
- GeGeGe no Kitaro radio drama (Theme song)

=== Songs ===
- Captain Ultra (TV series) (Insert song Tom & Huck)
- Denki Groove's "Karateka" (Narration)
- GeGeGe no Kitaro (First and second opening themes)
- M-Flo's "Beat Space Nine" (Intermezzo)

== Awards ==
Kumakura received the 1998 Kinokuniya theater award for his performance in Neil Simon's The Sunshine Boys. In 2011, he won the selection committee's special award at the Yomiuri Theatrical Grand Awards.

== Honours ==
- Medal with Purple Ribbon (1991)
- Order of the Rising Sun, 4th Class, Gold Rays with Rosette (1998)
