= TV Jadran =

TV Jadran is a Croatian commercial television station, licensed to broadcast in Split-Dalmatia County.

It was launched in Split, Croatia, in late 1993 under the name of CATV as cable-only station. Few years later it received a broadcasting license for Split-Dalmatia County and became available to the rest of County under the name Adriatic TV (ATV). Finally, since the beginning of 2004, it was renamed into TV Jadran. Its signal also spreads over the neighbouring parts of Šibenik-Knin County and Dubrovnik-Neretva County, from Vodice on the north to Metković on the south. For the near future there is a plan to cover Croatia's far south territory and western part of Montenegro as it is already done over Western, Central and Eastern Herzegovina Counties in Federation of Bosnia and Herzegovina with over 1 million inhabitants over there.
