= Billie Lou Watt =

American actress (1924–2001)

- Watt in 1965
- Born: June 20, 1924; St. Louis, Missouri, U.S.
- Died: September 7, 2001 (aged 77); New York City, U.S.
- Occupation: Actress
- Years active: 1938–2001
- Spouse: Hal Studer (m. 19??)
- Children: 3

Billie Lou Watt (June 20, 1924 – September 7, 2001) was an American actress. She was best known as the original English dub voice of the title characters of the 1960s anime series Astro Boy and Kimba the White Lion, the character Elsie the Cow for Borden Cheese's television commercials, and a live-action turn playing Ellie Harper Bergman on the soap opera Search for Tomorrow.

== Early life ==
Watt was born on June 20, 1924, in St. Louis, Missouri, the daughter of Mr. and Mrs. E. J. Watt. She attended Midland and Howe Heights schools and Ritenour High School and received dramatic training at St. Louis School of the Theater. She was also active with a local amateur theatrical group. Her education continued at Northwestern University.

== Career ==
Her first role on a professional stage came two years later at the St. Louis Municipal Opera production of The American Way. Her first acting role using mainly her voice was heard by listeners of the KMOX radio program The Land We Live In. She graduated from Ritenour High School.

Watt's first regular role on television had her portraying the girlfriend of the title character in The Billy Bean Show (1949, 1951). A review of The Billy Bean Show in the trade publication Billboard said: "Billie Lou Watt did a smooth job as his girl friend. This ingenue should be a natural for many television shows." She also appeared on the 1958 series From These Roots as Maggie Barber Weaver.

Her career in animation began after she and her husband Hal Studer were suggested by Fred Ladd as actors in his journey into animation, with their first successful project being Astro Boy in 1963. Along the way, Billie Lou and Hal learned how to write character dialog and situations as Ladd brought in more shows to work on, resulting in such series as Kimba the White Lion (as Kimba) and Gigantor (as Jimmy Sparks). Ladd's cast remained close during Watt's career, including her friend Ray Owens, his wife Sonia, and Gilbert Mack. Watt returned to acting as herself on the soap opera The Edge of Night in the role of Florence Hatcher in 1967, but her longest television role would be Ellie Harper Bergman on Search for Tomorrow from 1968 to 1981.

Watt continued to provide voice-acting and script-writing duties for English redubs of Japanese anime, such as the 1970s feature-length Jack and the Beanstalk (as Jack), Taro the Dragon Boy (as the title character), and the Biblical-based television series Superbook (as Christopher Peeper and various other characters) and The Flying House (as Justin Casey and various other characters).

Later in life, Watt's voice was heard by radio listeners of In-Touch Networks who are visually impaired or completely blind. Watt's final acting role was the voice of Ma Bagge (Eustace's mother) on the series Courage the Cowardly Dog from 1999 to 2001. The fourth (and final) season of Courage the Cowardly Dog was dedicated to her memory.

== Death ==
Watt succumbed to lung cancer in New York City later in 2001, leaving her husband Hal and their three children. For her contributions to the entertainment industry, and her charitable works, she was inducted into the Ritenour Alumni Hall of Fame in 2005.
