= Jeffrey Steefel =

American actor and video games creator (born 1961)

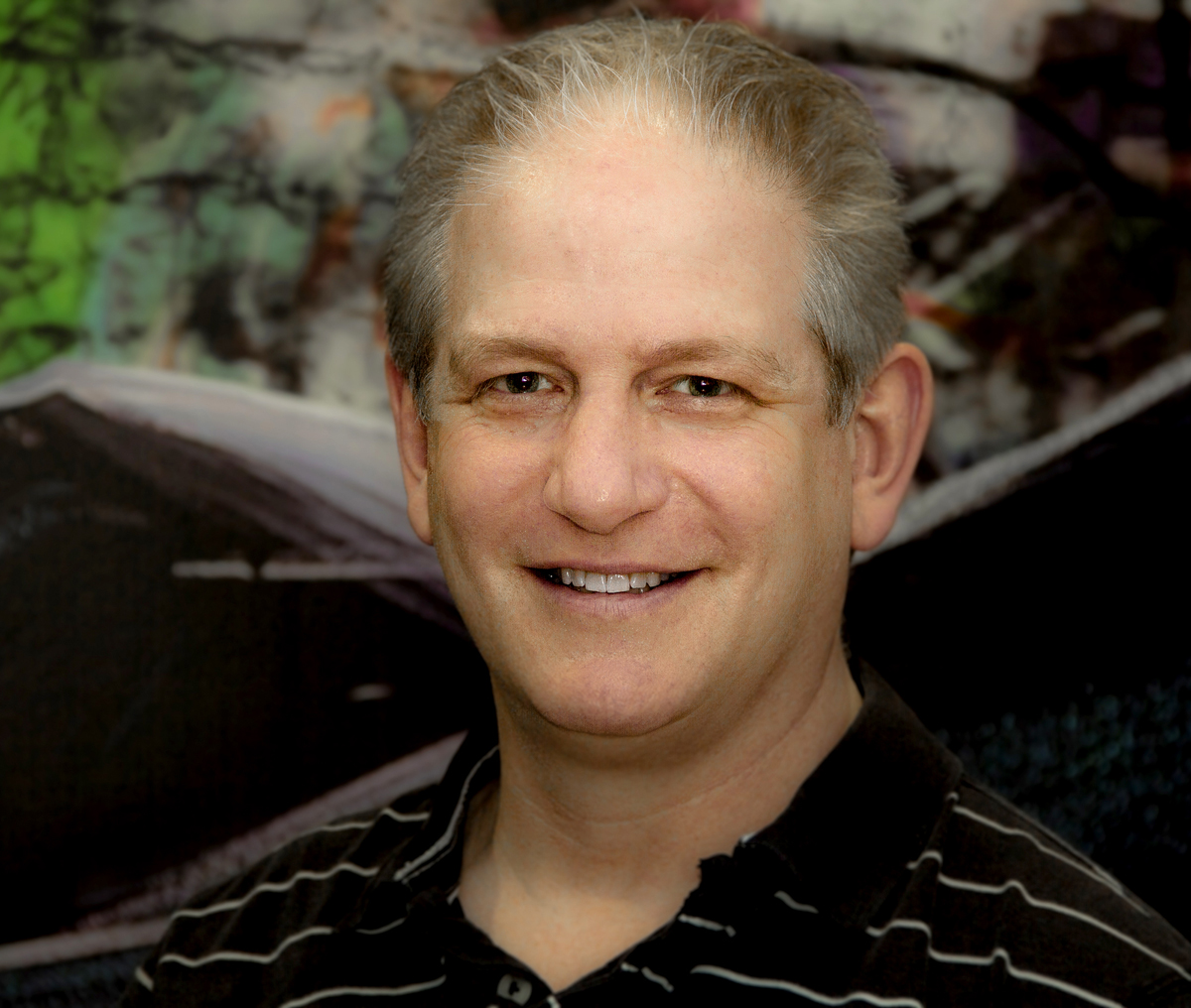
- Born: June 1, 1961 (age 65); San Francisco, California, USA
- Occupation: Video game developer (Wizards of the Coast)
- Spouse: Carissa Channing-Steefel

Jeffrey Steefel is a creator of video games and former actor. He earned a degree in drama from University of California, Davis. Steefel served as Executive Producer at Turbine, Inc. from 2004 to 2015, during which time he led the creation and launch of The Lord of the Rings Online. Since 2015, he has been building a game development studio at Wizards of the Coast, currently in Open Beta with Magic: The Gathering Arena, the studio's first game.

== Acting career ==
As a young adult in the 1980s, Steefel left his native California for New York City to pursue an acting career. After having graduated from the Circle in the Square professional acting program, he performed and sang in off-Broadway productions.

Steefel helped found the Project III Ensemble Theater, where he managed the 1986 production of Flood by Günter Grass, and appeared onstage in Molière's The Imaginary Invalid and the world premiere of Bliss by Mikhail Bulgakov.

Steefel's most notable New York performance was at the Lamb's Theatre, in the role of Jesus in the 1989 revival of Godspell, alongside young actors Trini Alvarado and Harold Perrineau, Jr. The production, directed by Don Scardino, caught the attention of New York Times writer Sonia Taitz, who wrote a lengthy article about the director and cast. In the article, cast members describe how Steefel was selected for the lead role by the director after the ensemble spent a week playing theater games. New York Times critic Stephen Holden gave the play and Steefel's performance a somewhat lukewarm review, though other reviews were more favorable and the play enjoyed full houses for a long run.

After several years in New York, Steefel headed back to California and became an ensemble member of the Colony Theater Company in Burbank. While there, he performed in the plays Rags and Working. According to his 1995 biography at The Colony Theatre Company website, he also appeared in soap operas on television.

== Computer games career ==
Steefel's early experience in game development includes his time as Vice President of Production at 7th Level, an interactive entertainment company. There he helped develop and maintain the company's strategic partnerships with such companies as IBM and Disney, and oversaw the creation of many games, including Tamagotchi, Monty Python's Complete Waste of Time, Monty Python's Meaning of Life, Ace Ventura Pet Detective (for which his wife provided the voices of characters "Oosik" and "Vanilla Sundae"), Fun on Imagination Island, and Timon & Pumbaa's Jungle Games.

Steefel then moved to Sony Online Entertainment as the Vice President of Programming & Production, where he headed their digital studios in Los Angeles and New York and supervised a large production staff. While there, he oversaw the launches of franchises such as JEOPARDY! Online, Wheel of Fortune Online, and Trivial Pursuit Online, among others. Steefel also developed strategic relationships with Columbia Tri-Star Television, MTV, RealNetworks, VH1, ESPN, Hasbro, and LucasArts.

In his next role, Steefel served as Vice President of Programming and Member Services for There, Inc., where he helped create an online virtual 3D environment tailored for mainstream consumers. He also headed customer service, community development, programming teams, and managed Member Services and content programming for a large-scale public Beta community, and oversaw its transition to a multi-player pay service.

In early 2004, Steefel joined Turbine, Inc. as Executive Producer of The Lord of the Rings Online, having stated in an interview that he had long been a fan of the Tolkien classic and made the move to Turbine specifically to work on this project. Turbine's The Lord of The Rings Online launched in 2007 and proved to be wildly popular among gamers and fans of Tolkien's book, as Steefel and his team strove to keep the environment of the game as faithful to the author's original writings as possible.

Steefel joined Wizards of the Coast in January 2017, to lead the newly created Digital Games Studio, focused on game development. The studio's first game was Magic: The Gathering Arena, released in Beta form in November 2017, and followed by full releases for Microsoft Windows and macOS in 2019 and 2020, respectively.

=== Games created by Jeffrey Steefel ===
- Monty Python's Complete Waste of Time (1994), 7th Level
- Battle Beast (1995), 7th Level, BMG Interactive
- Ace Ventura (1996), Bomico Entertainment Software
- Monty Python's The Meaning of Life (1997), Panasonic Interactive Media
- Raymond E. Feist's Return to Krondor (1998), Sierra On-Line
- Sports JEOPARDY! Online (1999), Sony Online Entertainment
- Trivial Pursuit Online (2000), Sony Online Entertainment
- There (2003), There, Inc.
- Asheron's Call 2: Legions (2005), Turbine, Inc.
- The Lord of the Rings Online: Shadows of Angmar (2007), Midway Games
- The Lord of the Rings Online: Mines of Moria (2008), Turbine, Inc.
- The Lord of the Rings Online: Siege of Mirkwood (2009), Turbine, Inc.
- Infinite Crisis (2014), WB Games
- Magic: the Gathering Arena (2018), Wizards of the Coast

== Personal life ==
Jeffrey Steefel is married and a father of twins. He and his wife, former writer and actress Carissa Channing-Steefel, reside in Burien, Washington.
