= Neo Tokyo =

Neo Tokyo or NeoTokyo may refer to:

== Anime and manga ==
- Neo Tokyo (film), a 1987 science fiction anthology anime film
- Neo Tokyo, the name of the city in the 1983 manga Mirai Keisatsu Urashiman

== Video games ==
- NeoTokyo, a 2009 Half-Life 2 first-person shooter modification
- NeoTokyo, a setting from the 1997 first-person shooter Helicops
- NeoTokyo, a setting from the 1996 fighting arcade game Last Bronx
- Neo Tokyo, a territory in the 2001 game Risk 2210 A.D.
- Neo Tokyo, a field in the 2015 soccer game Rocket League
- Neo Tokyo, level in the 2002 first-person shooter TimeSplitters 2
- Neo Tokio, a city in the 1995 role playing game Terranigma

== Other uses ==
- "Neotokyo", a 2015 single by The Algorithm
- "Neo Tokyo", a song on the 2016 album The Uncanny Valley by Perturbator
- NeoTokyo, the name of a megalopolis in the 2012 card game Android: Netrunner
- Dreams of Neo-Tokyo, a 2017 album by Scandroid

== See also ==
- Neo-Tōkyō Plan, a futuristic Tokyo project from the Metabolism movement
- Tokyo-3, a city from the 1995 anime Neon Genesis Evangelion
- New New York (disambiguation), several futuristic New York topics
- NT (disambiguation)
