= Monty Python's The Meaning of Life (disambiguation) =

Monty Python's The Meaning of Life is a 1983 film.

Monty Python's The Meaning of Life may also refer to:

- Monty Python's The Meaning of Life (album), 1983 soundtrack for the film
- Monty Python's The Meaning of Life (book), 1983
- Monty Python's The Meaning of Life (video game), 1997

== See also ==
- Meaning of Life (disambiguation)
