= List of Timon & Pumbaa episodes =

The following is an episode list for The Lion King's Timon & Pumbaa, an American animated television series made by Walt Disney Television Animation, based on Disney's 1994 feature film The Lion King. It follows the adventures of Timon the meerkat and Pumbaa the warthog, as they continue to live by their problem-free philosophy hakuna matata. Rafiki, Zazu, and hyena trio Shenzi, Banzai, and Ed are also each given their own segments occasionally.

Much like Aladdin, almost every episode title is a parody of a famous movie, song, phrase, or TV show. Geographic place names, usually those where an episode is set, form the basis of the puns, for example "To Kilimanjaro Bird" is a combination of the novel To Kill a Mockingbird and the name of the mountain Kilimanjaro; "Kenya Be My Friend" & "Catch Me if you Kenya" feature the name of Kenya, Africa.

In the fall of 1995, 13 episodes premiered on Friday afternoons on the syndicated Disney Afternoon block, and 12 more episodes aired on Saturday mornings on CBS at the same time. In the fall of 1996, 13 new episodes aired on The Disney Afternoon, with 8 more premiering on CBS. The syndicated and CBS episodes from both 1995 and 1996 each constituted a single production season, but because they are divided here, the episodes from the two seasons are not listed according to their broadcast chronology. In 1998, 39 new episodes were produced due to overseas demand. These episodes began airing on Toon Disney on January 1, 1999. In total, the series ran for 85 half-hour episodes, with 171 segments.

In the third season, characters like Simba, Speedy, Fred, Irwin, Boss Beaver, the Vulture Police, Rabbit, Toucan Dan, and the Natives are absent.

== Series overview ==
Season	Segments	Episodes		Originally released		
Season	Segments	Episodes		First released	Last released	Network
1	26	25	13	September 8, 1995	December 29, 1995	Syndicated
1	24	25	12	September 16, 1995	December 16, 1995	CBS
2	24	21	13	September 2, 1996	November 25, 1996	Syndicated
2	16	21	8	September 14, 1996	November 9, 1996	CBS
3	78	39		January 1, 1999	September 24, 1999	Toon Disney

== Episode segments ==
Each segment of the episodes in the first season starring The Lion King Characters:

- "Timon & Pumbaa": starring Timon and Pumbaa.
- "Rafiki Fables": starring Rafiki.
- "The Laughing Hyenas": starring Shenzi, Banzai and Ed.
- Songs: starring Timon and Pumbaa singing a song.

== Episodes ==
=== Season 1 (1995) ===
Timon is voiced by Nathan Lane & Quinton Flynn in this season. Lane, Timon's original voice actor, reprises his role as the character in 10 episodes while Flynn fills in for him in 31 episodes.

No. overall	No. in season	Title	Produced and directed by	Written by	Storyboard by	Original release date
Syndication
1	1	"Boara Boara"	Tony Craig & Roberts Gannaway	Roberts Gannaway	Todd Frederiksen	September 8, 1995
1	1	"Saskatchewan Catch"	Rob LaDuca	Darrel Campbell	Phil Weinstein	September 8, 1995
On a tropical island, Timon and Pumbaa run into The Three Natives who make Pumbaa their god-king and try to kill Timon for intending to "abduct" him. Timon and Pumbaa help a female flying squirrel find love in return for her fetching them some Saskatchewan tree beetles.
2	2	"Kenya Be My Friend?"	Tony Craig & Roberts Gannaway	Roberts Gannaway	Wendell Washer	September 15, 1995
2	2	"Rafiki Fables: Good Mousekeeping"	Tony Craig & Roberts Gannaway	Byron Simpson	Ashley Brannon & Andrew Stanton	September 15, 1995
Following a bitter falling out on "Bestest Best Friend Day", Timon and Pumbaa each vow to find another Bestest Best Friend, and they are successful in meeting each other's polar opposites (Baampu and Monti), until they realize how much they miss each other. Rafiki comes across a mouse who wishes to be bigger to gain more respect. Rafiki grants him his wish, and he soon discovers that being big does not necessarily mean more respect.
3	3	"Never Everglades"	Tony Craig & Roberts Gannaway	Roberts Gannaway	Cynthia Petrovic	September 22, 1995
3	3	"The Laughing Hyenas: Cooked Goose"	Tony Craig & Roberts Gannaway	Trey Callaway & Nancy Neufeld	Wendell Washer & Mark Swan	September 22, 1995
An alligator egg hatches underneath Pumbaa, leading the baby alligator to believe that Pumbaa is his mother. Pumbaa takes him in as "Pumbaa Jr.", but Timon is less than pleased with the "ugly chicken" and their new "relaxed" lifestyle. Two cheetahs, Cheetata and Cheetato, send Shenzi, Banzai, and Ed on a wild goose chase in order to stop them from thwarting their hunting efforts, but they repeatedly fail from treasure maps, airplanes, and even a trip to the North Pole.
4	4	"How to Beat the High Costa Rica"	Tony Craig & Roberts Gannaway	Roberts Gannaway	Cynthia Petrovic	September 29, 1995
4	4	"Swiss Missed"	Tony Craig & Roberts Gannaway	Mirith J.S. Colao	Sharon Forward	September 29, 1995
After accidentally returning a stolen fortune to an escaped convict, Criminal Quint, Timon, and Pumbaa resolve to steal the money back themselves instead of going to the police. When a much-loved clock breaks down whilst the respected timekeeper is away thanks to Timon's Hakuna Matata lectures, Timon and Pumbaa resolve to track him down to fix it before rival timekeeper Clockwork Quint has him fired and ruined.
5	5	"Uganda Be an Elephant"	Tony Craig & Roberts Gannaway	Kevin Campbell	Cullen Blaine & Ken Boyer	October 6, 1995
5	5	"To Kilimanjaro Bird"	Rob LaDuca	Darrel Campbell	Ryan Anthony	October 6, 1995
Upon seeing the respect elephants earn from other animals, Timon attempts to physically transform Pumbaa into one. In retribution for stealing Baby Earl's bug breakfast, Timon and Pumbaa are forced by Earl's mother to babysit him while she goes for more bugs. They soon realize that Earl is more than a handful to look after.
6	6	"French Fried"	Tony Craig & Roberts Gannaway	Kevin Campbell	Ken Harsha	October 13, 1995
6	6	"The Laughing Hyenas: Big Top Breakfast"	Jeff DeGrandis	Trey Callaway & Nancy Neufeld	Ryan Anthony & Ken Mitchroney	October 13, 1995
Timon and Pumbaa befriended a talking snail and (nick)named him "Speedy" before the three of them are transported to France, where they are forced to save Speedy from a crazed chef, Culinary Quint. When a Circus box drops from a plane, Shenzi, Banzai, and Ed meet a young circus monkey whom they try to catch and eat, by making a fake circus stunt.
7	7	"The Pain in Spain"	Tony Craig & Roberts Gannaway	Roberts Gannaway	Sharon Forward	November 3, 1995
7	7	"Frantic Atlantic"	Rob LaDuca	Kevin Campbell & Gordon Kent	Lonnie Lloyd	November 3, 1995
In Spain, Pumbaa is mistaken for a bull and captured by two bull catchers, Carlos and Consuelo Quint. But Pumbaa soon discovers that the current champion, El Toro, is unwilling to give up his title without a fight, leaving Timon unaware that he's not fighting Pumbaa until it's too late. After being mistaken during their trip in Antarctica, Timon and Pumbaa meet a dimwitted penguin named Irwin, whose apologies annoy Timon. After the three get a ride on a boat, Irwin makes a mess of things, and Pumbaa eventually gives in that Timon is right about Irwin.
8	8	"Tanzania Zany"	Rob LaDuca	Mirith J.S. Colao	Carin-Anne Anderson	November 10, 1995
8	8	"Guatemala Malarkey"	Tony Craig & Roberts Gannaway	Roberts Gannaway	Cullen Blaine	November 10, 1995
Timon and Pumbaa are visited by Timon's old best friend Fred, a practical joker who bonds more with Pumbaa than with Timon. Timon and Pumbaa try to plunder an ancient temple protected by a giant mummified beetle.
9	9	"Back Out in the Outback"	Rob LaDuca	Bruce Talkington	Jill Colbert	November 17, 1995
9	9	"Gabon with the Wind"	Rob LaDuca	Mark Saraceni	Holly Forsyth	November 17, 1995
Having gone to the Australian Outback, Timon and Pumbaa split up so each can fulfill his potential as a bug hunter. Timon tries to do this by catching a land crab, believing him to be a large bug. Pumbaa believes that Timon has betrayed him to Cheetata and Cheetato in order to save his own skin.
10	10	"Timon's Time Togo"	Tony Craig & Roberts Gannaway	Mirith J. Colao	Ken Boyer	November 24, 1995
10	10	"The Law of the Jungle"	Tony Craig & Roberts Gannaway	Steve Roberts	Wendell Washer	November 24, 1995
Under a shady tree in hot weather on what he believes to be a Wednesday afternoon, Timon eats a toxic bug and dies. He is destined for Heck, but gets a second chance. So an angel agrees to send him back to earth so that he can do one good deed to enter heaven. Timon resolves to never again do any good deeds, since that tactic will ensure he'll live forever. Timon breaks the law by using a certain stick to scratch his back. He is brought before a court of law where he must prove his guilt or innocence as punishment.
11	11	"Be More Pacific"	Tony Craig & Roberts Gannaway	Roberts Gannaway	Sharon Forward	December 1, 1995
11	11	"Going Uruguay"	Tony Craig & Roberts Gannaway	Kevin Campbell & Mirith J. Colao; Story by : Heather C. Kenyon	Ken Harsha	December 1, 1995
Pumbaa saves the life of an enchanted whale and gets three wishes. Pumbaa doesn't wish anything for himself, but Timon has some suggestions. Note: This episode is a parallel to the Brothers Grimm fairy tale, The Fisherman and His Wife. Timon and Pumbaa help a lost termite king get back to his home, secretly planning to eat him and his subjects.
12	12	"Yosemite Remedy"	Rob LaDuca	Mirith J. Colao	Jill Colbert	December 22, 1995
12	12	"Rafiki Fables: The Sky Is Calling"	Rob LaDuca	Byron Simpson, Kevin Campbell & Mirith J. Colao	Ryan Anthony	December 22, 1995
A raccoon criminal steals Timon and Pumbaa's valuables and since the Vulture Police can't arrest him, Timon wants to get even. A meteorite lands in between Timon and Pumbaa. Pumbaa wants to return the meteorite to outer space, while Timon wants them to ignore it, leading to a falling-out between the two. Rafiki orders Pumbaa to return the meteorite to outer space and orders Timon not to help Pumbaa.
13	13	"Mozam-Beaked"	Tony Craig & Roberts Gannaway	Roberts Gannaway	Ken Boyer	December 29, 1995
13	13	"Ocean Commotion"	Tony Craig & Roberts Gannaway	Kevin Campbell	Cullen Blaine	December 29, 1995
A woodpecker wakes Timon and Pumbaa from their nap under their favorite tree. The two try to stop the woodpecker from eating the tree. After almost getting thrown off a cruise ship due to being stowaways, Timon and Pumbaa once again meet Speedy. However, a diamond collector tries to obtain Speedy's shell and turn it into an earring for his wife. Can Timon and Pumbaa save Speedy in time?
CBS
14	14	"Brazil Nuts"	Jeff DeGrandis	Kevin Campbell	Denise Koyama	September 16, 1995
14	14	"South Sea Sick"	Tony Craig & Roberts Gannaway	Bobbi JG Weiss & David Cody Weiss	Cynthia Petrovic	September 16, 1995
14	14	"Song: The Lion Sleeps Tonight"	Ashley Quinn & Darrell Van Citters	N/A	N/A	September 16, 1995
After being lured by two carnivorous snakes, Eddie and Ralph, into a gourmet restaurant trap, Timon and Pumbaa resolve to get their own delicious revenge. Pumbaa falls ill during a feast, and Timon attempts to treat him, unaware that Pumbaa's illness is far more simple than it looks. Timon and Pumbaa sing "The Lion Sleeps Tonight" as, after their dinner (grubs) escape them, they traipse the peaceful and quiet jungle in search for food, unaware that a real lion is wide awake and following them. The lion turns out to be Simba, and the three friends enjoy their time together. Note: The song in this musical segment was used in the original film.
15	15	"Yukon Con"	Tony Craig & Roberts Gannaway	Kevin Campbell	Lonnie Lloyd	September 23, 1995
15	15	"Doubt of Africa"	Jeff DeGrandis	Mark Saraceni	Joe Horne	September 23, 1995
Timon and Pumbaa fall out over a gold nugget. A prospector, Kusko Quint, convinces Timon the gold nugget is rightfully Timon's and helps Timon steal it from Pumbaa. Note: This episode marks the first time Kevin Schon voices Timon in an episode of the series. He and Nathan Lane share Timon's voice during the character's lines. Timon and Pumbaa meet a wisecracking widowed tigress with a constant cold. The tigress has a large family and no way of feeding it, so Timon and Pumbaa try to teach her how to hunt.
16	16	"Russia Hour"	Jeff DeGrandis	Mirith J. Colao	Ken Mitchroney	September 30, 1995
16	16	"You Ghana Join the Club"	Jeff DeGrandis	Kevin Campbell; Story by : Bobbi JG Weiss & David Cody Weiss	Ken Mitchroney	September 30, 1995
Timon and Pumbaa visit Pumbaa's ballet-dancing Uncle Boaris for his grand performance, but a reckless act by Timon sends Boaris to the hospital, leaving it up to Pumbaa to learn ballet and give the performance in a week's time. After being thrown out of their favorite relaxing spot by a pesky group of ground squirrels, the Teds, Timon, and Pumbaa are forced to perform a series of tasks involving a vicious lion in order to get back inside. Eventually, the enraged lion sees through the Teds' game and declares all-out war against them.
17	17	"Rocky Mountain Lie"	Jeff DeGrandis	Roberts Gannaway	Shawna Cha	October 7, 1995
17	17	"Amazon Quiver"	Jeff DeGrandis	Trey Callaway & Nancy Neufeld	Michael Bennett	October 7, 1995
Timon leads Pumbaa on a wild goose chase around the Canadian Rockies to search for Pumbaa's new bug friend who Timon believes he accidentally ate. Timon and Pumbaa are chased into the trunk of a hollow tree by a ravenous panther. After previous attempts to escape backfire, the two decide to wait out the predator in an attempt to survive. But how long will that take?
18	18	"Madagascar About You"	Jeff DeGrandis	Mirith J. Colao	Jeffrey Siergey	October 14, 1995
18	18	"Truth or Zaire"	Jeff DeGrandis	Kevin Campbell	Joe Horne	October 14, 1995
18	18	"Song: Yummy Yummy Yummy"	Steve Moore	N/A	N/A	October 14, 1995
A lemur makes Pumbaa marry a pink female warthog. Timon tells Pumbaa that if he gets married, he will no longer do what he normally does with Timon. In order to not make that happen, Timon makes Pumbaa dirty and smelly during the wedding ceremony so that the bride calls the wedding off. While on the run from the adventurer Congo Quint, Timon and Pumbaa end up in baby clothes and are taken in by a ditzy mother mountain gorilla. But how long can they keep up the farce until Congo Quint finds them? Timon and Pumbaa sing "Yummy Yummy Yummy" as they celebrate eating grubs, expressing their love and satisfaction for their tastes. The two then fight over a single bug, in a manner similar to street harassment, that happens to be a stinkbug.
19	19	"Mojave Desserted"	Jeff DeGrandis	Patricia Jones & Donald Reiker	Michael Bennett	October 21, 1995
19	19	"Rafiki Fables: Beauty and the Wildebeest"	Jeff DeGrandis	Byron Simpson	Ken Mitchroney	October 21, 1995
Timon and Pumbaa save the life of an annoying and obnoxious rabbit, who then tries to repay them by waiting on them hand and foot. A wildebeest goes to Rafiki for help in impressing a beautiful gazelle he is in love with.
20	20	"Don't Break the China"	Tony Craig & Roberts Gannaway	Roberts Gannaway	Cynthia Petrovic	October 28, 1995
20	20	"The Laughing Hyenas: Can't Take A Yolk"	Rob LaDuca	Trey Callaway & Nancy Neufeld	Holly Forsyth	October 28, 1995
20	20	"Song: Stand by Me"	Steve Moore	N/A	N/A	October 28, 1995
Timon and Pumbaa attempt to reunite a lost baby panda with its parents by trekking all over China. When morning comes, Shenzi, Banzai, and Ed try to steal an ostrich egg away from its mother, but keep failing until they disguised themselves as birds. Timon sings "Stand by Me" along with three frogs, as he states how happy he will be as long as he has Pumbaa by his side, all while various unfortunate events keep happening to Pumbaa, which he doesn't notice. Note: This musical segment was released theatrically as a short film on December 22, 1995, attached to Walt Disney Pictures' Tom and Huck. It was also featured on selected VHS releases from Walt Disney Home Video in 1996, including A Kid in King Arthur's Court, The Big Green and Disney Sing Along Songs: Topsy Turvy. It was also the only musical segment to use digital ink and paint.
21	21	"Unlucky in Lesotho"	Rob LaDuca	Kevin Campbell	Carin-Anne Anderson & Cullen Blaine	November 4, 1995
21	21	"Rafiki Fables: Rafiki's Apprentice"	Rob LaDuca	Byron Simpson	Craig Kemplin	November 4, 1995
Timon wants to join Ned's Good Luck Club and in order to do so, he must protect Ned's Lucky Jar (which is really an unlucky jar). However, this proves to be a challenge when Pumbaa accidentally brings home a black panther cub (since black cats mean bad luck). Rafiki's nephew comes to visit and wants to learn magic from him. Sadly, it gets out of control, especially when he starts to make trees walk. Note: The plot of this episode mirrors the plot of The Sorcerer's Apprentice, which stars Mickey Mouse.
22	22	"Mombasa-In-Law"	Jeff DeGrandis	Mirith J. Colao	Joe Horne	November 11, 1995
22	22	"The Laughing Hyenas: TV Dinner"	Jeff DeGrandis	Trey Callaway & Nancy Neufeld	Ken Mitchroney	November 11, 1995
Timon gets a visit from his mother. To convince her that Timon has settled down, Pumbaa has to play Timon's wife. Shenzi, Banzai, and Ed each try to convince a filmmaker into making a wildlife documentary about them, rather than about an armadillo, but keep failing to star for steaks, until they decided to eat the filmmaker.
23	23	"Manhattan Mishap"	Jeff DeGrandis	Darrel Campbell	Michael Bennett	November 25, 1995
23	23	"Paraguay Parable"	Jeff DeGrandis	Roberts Gannaway	Ken Mitchroney	November 25, 1995
While on their way to New York, Timon and Pumbaa get kicked off an airplane (due to Pumbaa's gas odor) and are marooned on an island with a starving man who wants to eat them. A lazy anteater tricks Timon and Pumbaa into competing over who can catch the most bugs.
24	24	"Let's Serengeti Out of Here"	Jeff DeGrandis	Kevin Campbell	Ken Mitchroney	December 9, 1995
24	24	"Congo on Like This"	Jeff DeGrandis	Mirith J. Colao	Joe Horne	December 9, 1995
Timon and Pumbaa are captured and forced to live in a wildlife preserve because its owner believes that they belong to endangered species. After rumors begin to spread, Timon believes that Simba has become a carnivore and intends to eat him and Pumbaa.
25	25	"Okay Bayou?"	Rob LaDuca	Karey Kirkpatrick	Lonnie Lloyd	December 16, 1995
25	25	"Shake Your Djibouti"	Jeff DeGrandis	Mirith J. Colao & Kevin Campbell	Ken Mitchroney	December 16, 1995
A wise, Cajun French-speaking possum guides Timon and Pumbaa through the Louisiana Bayou to reach the great "Boudreaux". Timon tries to whip Simba into shape when a 40-foot tall monster is on the loose.

=== Season 2 (1996) ===
Kevin Schon, who sung the show's theme song "Hakuna Matata", voices Timon in this season and onwards, replacing both Nathan Lane and Quinton Flynn.

No. overall	No. in season	Title	Produced and directed by	Written by	Storyboard by	Original release date
Syndication
26	1	"Palm Beached"	Tony Craig & Roberts Gannaway	Roberts Gannaway	Cynthia Petrovic	September 2, 1996
26	1	"Jamaica Mistake?"	Tony Craig & Roberts Gannaway	Darrel Campbell	Cynthia Petrovic	September 2, 1996
Timon and Pumbaa's newest napping spot is moved to a posh hotel. After being evicted by hotel manager Concierge Quint, they repeatedly try to sneak back in. Timon and Pumbaa pursue a supposed moth into a scary house where they are imprisoned by vampire bats.
27	2	"Oregon Astray"	Tony Craig & Roberts Gannaway	Roberts Gannaway	Cynthia Petrovic	September 9, 1996
27	2	"New Guinea Pig"	Tony Craig & Roberts Gannaway	Roberts Gannaway	Mark Swan	September 9, 1996
Pumbaa gets a lazy Timon and himself jobs as dam builders for Boss Beaver, leading to Timon becoming a workaholic, knowing that he'll be rich within days. Pumbaa gets tired of his tusks, so Timon decides to sell them to the Three Natives.
28	3	"Klondike Con"	Tony Craig & Roberts Gannaway	Mirith J. Colao	Cullen Blaine	September 16, 1996
28	3	"Isle Find Out"	Tony Craig & Roberts Gannaway	Roberts Gannaway	Jill Colbert & Cynthia Petrovic	September 16, 1996
While mining for gold in the Klondike, Timon and Pumbaa join forces with a friendly man named Courteous Quint, who is Claim Jumper Quint in disguise. Although Quint repeatedly fakes saving Timon's life, Timon refuses to trust him. After observing a colony of flamingos standing still for hours, Timon becomes obsessed with finding out what they are up to.
29	4	"Wide Awake in Wonderland"	Tony Craig & Roberts Gannaway	Mirith J. Colao	Cullen Blaine	September 23, 1996
29	4	"Zazu's Off-by-One Day"	Tony Craig & Roberts Gannaway	Kevin Campbell	Cynthia Petrovic	September 23, 1996
The insomniac Pumbaa makes Timon read him warthog/meerkat versions of The Ant and the Grasshopper and Goldilocks and the Three Bears. As the stories put warthogs in a good light and meerkats in a bad light, Timon dislikes every story he reads and decides to make up one himself. Zazu gets fired from his job after he forgets to count one single animal on his (nearly) complete list of animals. He sets out in a quest to find out which animal he forgot.
30	5	"Africa-Dabra!"	Tony Craig & Roberts Gannaway	Roberts Gannaway	Ryan Anthony & Craig Kemplin	September 30, 1996
30	5	"I Don't Bolivia"	Tony Craig & Roberts Gannaway	Kevin Campbell	Ben Stone	September 30, 1996
A magic rabbit breaks up Timon and Pumbaa's friendship, so he and Timon can create a successful magic act and win a talent show. A criminal toucan named Toucan Dan talks Timon into releasing him from a cage. After recapturing Toucan Dan, Timon is again talked into releasing him, leading to a cycle of recaptures and re-releases. The episode ends with Timon impersonating Toucan Dan, the Vulture Police capturing Timon, Toucan Dan impersonating Timon... and Pumbaa having to determine which is which.
31	6	"Catch Me if You Kenya"	Tony Craig & Roberts Gannaway	Roberts Gannaway	Tony Craig	October 7, 1996
31	6	"Scent of the South"	Tony Craig & Roberts Gannaway	Roberts Gannaway	Jill Colbert & Ken Mitchroney	October 7, 1996
Timon and Pumbaa try to pass a vicious tiger in order to break into a butterfly collector's collection to free the butterflies. When Timon suddenly finds Pumbaa's natural smell disgusting, the unhappy Pumbaa decides to freshen up his smell with the help of a perfume-knowledgeable skunk.
32	7	"Forbidden Pumbaa"	Tony Craig & Roberts Gannaway	Kevin Campbell	Bob Logan	October 14, 1996
32	7	"Washington Applesauce"	Tony Craig & Roberts Gannaway	Kevin Campbell	Michael Goguen & Mark Zoeller	October 14, 1996
Pumbaa and, accidentally, Timon are kidnapped by an alien spacecraft and are taken to a vast laboratory. A voracious worm eats the apples of Apple Valley, threatening the continued existence of the annual apple festival. Timon and Pumbaa are hired to catch the worm. This is a parody of Jaws.
33	8	"I Think I Canada"	Tony Craig & Roberts Gannaway	Roberts Gannaway	Cynthia Petrovic	October 21, 1996
33	8	"Zazu's Off Day Off"	Tony Craig & Roberts Gannaway	Kevin Campbell	Joe Horne	October 21, 1996
A carnivorous wolverine enrolls Timon and Pumbaa in a training camp so they can get in better shape. It's Zazu's day off, but before he can enjoy it, he is informed that an elephant named Jumbo Jumbo is causing problems at the river. Zazu reluctantly agrees to fix the problem.
34	9	"Timon on the Range"	Tony Craig & Roberts Gannaway	Kevin Campbell	Bob Logan & Ken Boyer	October 28, 1996
34	9	"The Man from J.U.N.G.L.E."	Tony Craig & Roberts Gannaway	Kevin Campbell	David Fulp & Bob Logan	October 28, 1996
When the criminal Cisco Pig goes missing, his gang mistakes Pumbaa for their leader. Timon makes sure to take advantage of their mistake. Timon impersonates the famous superhero Super Duper Hero X to make money. When he is subsequently kidnapped by the superhero's arch nemesis Chromosome Quint, Pumbaa and Speedy have to save their friend.
35	10	"Maine-Iacs"	Tony Craig & Roberts Gannaway	Roberts Gannaway	Cynthia Petrovic	November 4, 1996
35	10	"Fiji-Fi-Fo-Fum"	Tony Craig & Roberts Gannaway	Bruce Talkington	Edward Baker	November 4, 1996
Timon and Pumbaa accidentally arrive at Boss Beaver's lumber mill where they, due to having violated a large number of safety regulations, are forced to take jobs. In order to afford dinner for Bestest Best Friend Day, Pumbaa trades his and Timon's cow for three magic bugs. At night, the bugs create a huge beanstalk that takes Timon and Pumbaa up into the clouds to a giant grasshopper. This is a parody of the folktale Jack and the Beanstalk.
36	11	"Once Upon a Timon" (Note: "Once Upon a Timon" and "Home Is Where the Hog Is" explain Timon and Pumbaa's origins, and how they came to be wandering loners, although The Lion King 1½ contradicted these episodes, especially the former.)	Tony Craig & Roberts Gannaway	Roberts Gannaway	Cynthia Petrovic & Ken Boyer	November 11, 1996
When Timon and Pumbaa refuse to tell Zazu about themselves, Zazu has Rafiki tell him why Timon is an outcast from his meerkat colony and how he first met Pumbaa. Note: This is the first and only episode to feature all of the original Lion King characters who returned in the series. Song: "Alone Together", performed by Kevin Schon and Ernie Sabella
37	12	"Home Is Where the Hog Is"	Eddy Houchins	Mirith J. Colao	Joe Horne & Amber Tornquist (part one)	November 18, 1996
37	12	"Home Is Where the Hog Is"	Eddy Houchins	Mirith J. Colao	David Fulp & Seth Kearsley (part two)	November 18, 1996
Pumbaa hears a distress call from the warthog sounder he was banished from while he and Timon eat bugs off a battered Jeep. It's up to the two to save the warthogs from the Guinea fowl that guard the entrance to the sounder.
38	13	"Bumble in the Jungle Plus: Beethoven's Whiff!"	Tony Craig & Roberts Gannaway	Story by : Roberts Gannaway	Joe Horne & Bob Logan	November 25, 1996
38	13	"Mind Over Matterhorn"	Tony Craig & Roberts Gannaway	Roberts Gannaway	Jill Colbert & Chris Rutkowski	November 25, 1996
"Beethoven's Whiff": Timon is trying to conduct Beethoven's Fifth Symphony, but Pumbaa keeps messing everything up, leading the two to be forced by Simba and Rafiki to clean up the mess they made. "Bumble in the Jungle": In this Fantasia-esque episode, Timon and Pumbaa try to catch a bumblebee. In order to get to Paris, France, Timon and Pumbaa attempt to get past a billy goat toll guard in numerous ways.
CBS
39	14	"Isle of Manhood"	Eddy Houchins	Mirith J. Colao	David Fulp	September 14, 1996
39	14	"Puttin' on the Brits"	Eddy Houchins	Steve Roberts	Amber Tornquist	September 14, 1996
A letter from The Meerkitten Society forces Timon to reveal that he still hasn't become a man, so Pumbaa must man Timon up himself. Timon & Pumbaa try to save a baby fox from a hound dog who's believed to be a hunter. But is the fox really in danger?
40	15	"Beetle Romania"	Eddy Houchins	Mirith J. Colao	David Fulp & Craig Kemplin	September 21, 1996
40	15	"Rumble in the Jungle"	Eddy Houchins	Sib Ventress	Joe Horne	September 21, 1996
When Timon tries to eat a gypsy moth, she curses him. Timon is subsequently transformed into a bug, and when Pumbaa eats him, Timon has to find a way out of Pumbaa's body. Timon and Pumbaa have a bitter argument and Rafiki tries to make them resolve their differences. When nothing works, Rafiki finally tells them to fight.
41	16	"Animal Barn"	Eddy Houchins	Sib Ventress	Amber Tornquist	September 28, 1996
41	16	"Roach Hotel"	Eddy Houchins	Kati Rocky	Ken Mitchroney	September 28, 1996
Pumbaa competes with the titleholder to win the Mr. Pig contest. Pumbaa is continuously beaten in the individual competitions, so Timon secretly cheats to make Pumbaa win. Timon and Pumbaa are hired to remove two cockroaches from "the cleanest hotel in the world" but are instructed to keep the hotel spotless while doing so if they wish to eat the cockroaches afterwards.
42	17	"Shopping Mauled"	Eddy Houchins	Mirith J. Colao & Gordon Kent	David Fulp	October 5, 1996
42	17	"Library Brouhaha"	Eddy Houchins	Mirith J. Colao	Bob Onorato	October 5, 1996
After Timon and Pumbaa accidentally find themselves in a shopping mall, they are spotted by the accident-prone penguin Irwin. Timon and Pumbaa try to evade him, but Irwin keeps pursuing them around the mall. This episode contains flashbacks to the episode "Frantic Atlantic". At a library, Timon and Pumbaa try to catch a bookworm. After a long pursuit, the three accidentally find themselves in the world of books – literally!
43	18	"Monster Massachusetts"	Eddy Houchins	Steve Roberts	Joe Horne	October 12, 1996
43	18	"Handle with Caribbean"	Eddy Houchins	Kevin Campbell	Bob Onorato	October 12, 1996
Mad scientist Dr. Cagliostro wants to make Timon & Pumbaa beautiful with his Metamorphotron. However, the machine makes his test subjects ugly. Can they change back so they can get out of the Cagliostro laboratory? Timon and Pumbaa try to get to Nashville, Tennessee. After they accidentally arrive on a pirate ship, a group of dimwitted pirates elect Timon to be their captain. When the pirates mess up on the directions to Nashville, Timon and Pumbaa go there themselves.
44	19	"Alcatraz Mataz" (Note: This is how this episode is called in its title card; it is credited as "Alcatraz-Mataz".)	Eddy Houchins	Steve Roberts	David Schwartz & Craig Kemplin	October 19, 1996
44	19	"Oahu Wahoo" (Note: This is how this episode is called in its title card; it is credited as "Oahu Wahoo!".)	Eddy Houchins	Steve Roberts	Bob Onorato	October 19, 1996
After Timon is framed by Toucan Dan for committing a crime, he and Pumbaa are thrown into jail by the Vulture Police. In order to clear their names, the two plan a desperate escape into the wild, where they can get Toucan Dan to confess that he is the true criminal. While Timon and Pumbaa are relaxing on an island, a tiki statue named Bahuka comes out of a volcano and gives Timon orders. Pumbaa thinks that Timon is crazy when he follows the orders.
45	20	"Beast of Eden"	Eddy Houchins	Jason Butler Rote	Elmer Hartman & Celia Kendrick	October 26, 1996
45	20	"Sense & Senegambia"	Eddy Houchins	Mirith J. Colao	Joe Horne & Seth Kearsley	October 26, 1996
Timon and Pumbaa agree to help a monster retrieve his gold tooth from the Three Natives and their leader. After Pumbaa fails to catch a cricket, Timon thinks that it's because he has a problem with his sense of seeing, hearing, and smelling, so he goes to the "Doctor's Office" to buy expensive aides. Later, Pumbaa realizes that he has to believe in himself to catch bugs.
46	21	"Rome Alone"	Tony Craig & Roberts Gannaway	Roberts Gannaway	Seth Kearsley & Craig Kemplin	November 9, 1996
46	21	"Amusement Bark"	Tony Craig & Roberts Gannaway	Roberts Gannaway	Cynthia Petrovic	November 9, 1996
When Simba is kidnapped by Roman Emperor, "Colosseum Quint-eus" for refusing to eat Timon and Pumbaa, the duo try to rescue him and stop his lion opponent Claudius from fighting him the next day. After deliberate accidents caused by Boss Beaver's obnoxious son Boy Beaver happen at an amusement park, Timon and Pumbaa must work at the park to repay the damage.

=== Season 3 (1999) ===
As of this season, the show was produced in Canada by the Vancouver-based Studio B Productions for Walt Disney Television Animation, with a new staff of producers, directors, writers, and storyboard artists. The episodes now open with the same title card artwork that is used in the Season 2 episode "Catch Me If You Kenya". These episodes premiered on the now-defunct Toon Disney.

No. overall	No. in season	Title	Directed by	Written by	Storyboard by	Original release date
47	1	"Whiff"	Mauro Casalese	Tedd Anasti & Patsy Cameron	Travis Cowsill, David Earl & Glen Lovett	January 1, 1999
47	1	"To Be Bee or Not To Be Bee"	Mauro Casalese	Don Gillies	Travis Cowsill, David Earl & Glen Lovett	January 1, 1999
When Timon reads a newspaper article about a golfer who got rich by making a hole in one, he and Pumbaa decide to play golf in order to get rich as well. However, the two are not so good at the sport as they have trouble hitting the golf ball. Timon & Pumbaa get caught by bees. When Timon and Pumbaa take over the bee colony with their Hakuna Matata, only one of the bees can get the Queen bee to come back.
48	2	"Luck Be a Meerkat"	Mauro Casalese	Roger Reitzel	Louie Escauriaga & Eduardo Soriano	January 8, 1999
48	2	"Just When You Thought You'd Cuisine It All"	Mauro Casalese	Matthew Negrete	Louie Escauriaga & Eduardo Soriano	January 8, 1999
Timon finds Pumbaa's lucky marble and decides to keep it as good things are happening to him. He and Pumbaa later have a fight over it. Timon and Pumbaa try to learn to cook.
49	3	"Lemonade Stand Off"	Mauro Casalese	Henry Gilroy	David Earl & Glen Lovett	January 15, 1999
49	3	"Big Jungle Game"	Mauro Casalese	Tracy Berna	David Earl & Glen Lovett	January 15, 1999
Timon and Pumbaa decide to start a lemonade stand. They then decide to go their separate ways and each start their own stand and spend all of their time trying to keep the other from sabotaging their stand. It turns out that their lemonade is terrible. Pumbaa joins an olympic jungle game to live out his dream.
50	4	"Boo Hoo Bouquet"	Mauro Casalese	Tedd Anasti & Patsy Cameron	Marlon Deane, Luisito Escauriaga & Glen Lovett	January 22, 1999
50	4	"Timon... Alone"	Mauro Casalese	Kat Likkel	Marlon Deane, Luisito Escauriaga & Glen Lovett	January 22, 1999
In order to get bees, Timon and Pumbaa have a business to sell flowers. The two try to give one of the flowers to a man, but the man hates flowers. Timon decides to start a new life by becoming a writer and in order to not be disturbed by Pumbaa, he wants to be alone, but he later changes his mind.
51	5	"So Sumo Me"	Brad Neave	Jeff Abel & Michael Keyes	Marlon Deane, David Earl & Gord McBride	January 29, 1999
51	5	"Now Museum, Now You Don't"	Brad Neave	Matthew Negrete	Marlon Deane, David Earl & Gord McBride	January 29, 1999
While in Japan, Timon and Pumbaa train to be sumo wrestlers. Timon and Pumbaa visit a museum where a security guard is protecting a bug exhibit from bug eaters.
52	6	"Visiting Pig-nitaries"	Brad Neave	Drew Daywalt & David Schneider	Luisito Escauriaga, Glen Lovett & Maurice Sherwood	February 5, 1999
52	6	"The Truth About Kats and Hogs"	Brad Neave	Sindy McKay	Luisito Escauriaga, Glen Lovett & Maurice Sherwood	February 5, 1999
Timon and Pumbaa are visiting in Etiquettica. When they run into an assistant to the Empress, who mistakes them for visiting dignitaries, Timon talks Pumbaa into going along with it. Pumbaa eats the bugs in front of the assistant, burps in the Empress' face, ruins Etiquettica's Constitution by using it as a tissue to blow his nose, then ruins a painting of Etiquettica's first Emperor, and ruins a fancy dinner. Timon covers up for it by saying, "A custom in our country". They get thrown out as soon as Timon admits that they're not fancy-schmancy dignitaries. An Animal Behavioral Scientist, Jean Farrell, is watching Pumbaa (whom she calls Melvin), although he doesn't like it very much. Soon she shows Pumbaa some bugs, and he doesn't care anymore. Timon (Billy Bob) has now caught Jean's attention. She cannot decide which animal to study, the meerkat or the warthog. Timon and Pumbaa try to help her decide with every talent they have, which makes her go crazy. She's so crazy that some male Naturalists think that she's a Wild Woman of the Jungle and take her away.
53	7	"Escape From Newark"	Mauro Casalese	Tracy Berna	Travis Cowsill, David Earl, Glen Lovett & Gord McBride	February 12, 1999
53	7	"Truth Be Told"	Mauro Casalese	Roger Reitzel	Travis Cowsill, David Earl, Glen Lovett & Gord McBride	February 12, 1999
Timon and Pumbaa are trapped in a 5 stars pet shop. Now they want to escape from their "golden cage". Timon and Pumbaa is going to tell everyone their secret of their long and everlasting friendship, but then Rafiki sends out a bee to stick them which makes them unable to lie. Then the truth will be told.
54	8	"Throw Your Hog in the Ring"	Mauro Casalese	Sindy McKay	Lazarino Baarde, Marlon Deane, Luisito Escauriaga & Maurice Sherwood	February 19, 1999
54	8	"Slalom Problem"	Mauro Casalese	Drew Daywalt & David Schneider	Lazarino Baarde, Marlon Deane, Luisito Escauriaga & Maurice Sherwood	February 19, 1999
Pumbaa uses his mouth odor as an effective weapon in wrestling. Timon and Pumbaa pretend to be skiing instructors in order to make money for a restaurant. Their first client is Mr. Bear.
55	9	"Circus Jerks"	Mauro Casalese	Tedd Anasti & Patsy Cameron	David Earl, Glen Lovett & Gord McBride	February 26, 1999
55	9	"Nest Best Thing"	Mauro Casalese	Joan Considine Johnson	David Earl, Glen Lovett & Gord McBride	February 26, 1999
Timon & Pumbaa are in a circus, making an angry clown jealous of them. Pumbaa builds a house for Little Jimmy, but Little Jimmy is actually a criminal, and his house is actually a hideout.
56	10	"Super Hog-O"	Mauro Casalese	Henry Gilroy	Lazarino Baarde, Marlon Deane, Luisito Escauriaga, Gary Scott, Maurice Sherwood & Eduardo Soriano	March 5, 1999
56	10	"Don't Have the Vegas Idea"	Mauro Casalese	Henry Gilroy	Lazarino Baarde, Marlon Deane, Luisito Escauriaga, Gary Scott, Maurice Sherwood & Eduardo Soriano	March 5, 1999
After an inspiration from a Lightning Lard comic, Pumbaa becomes a superhero. To get money for lobsters (which is mistakened for bugs), Timon and Pumbaa get jobs in an act involving White Lions.
57	11	"Hot Enough For Ya?"	Brad Neave	Roger Reitzel	Travis Cowsill, David Earl & Gord McBride	March 12, 1999
57	11	"Werehog of London"	Brad Neave	Matthew Negrete	Travis Cowsill, David Earl & Gord McBride	March 12, 1999
After creating their own bug chili, Timon and Pumbaa have a contest to see who can cook the hottest and spiciest dish before one of them surrenders. Timon and Pumbaa visit London when they encounter a spooky fortune teller who leads Timon to believe that Pumbaa is a sinister werehog.
58	12	"Bigfoot, Littlebrain"	Brad Neave	Roger Reitzel	Luisito Escauriaga, Glen Lovett & Maurice Sherwood	March 19, 1999
58	12	"Astro-Nots"	Brad Neave	Tracy Berna	Luisito Escauriaga, Glen Lovett & Maurice Sherwood	March 19, 1999
Timon & Pumbaa meet Bigfoot. When they eat Bigfoot's bug friends, Bigfoot makes them keep him company so that he won't be lonely. After reading a newspaper that says that bugs are hidden inside Martian rocks, Timon and Pumbaa go to NASA (National Academy for the Study of Ants) in order to go to Mars to find bugs.
59	13	"Robin Hoodwinked"	Brad Neave	Barry Hawkins	Lazarino Baarde, Marlon Deane & Glen Lovett	March 26, 1999
59	13	"Serengeti Western"	Brad Neave	Matthew Negrete	Lazarino Baarde, Marlon Deane & Glen Lovett	March 26, 1999
In order to buy bugs, Timon becomes Robin Hood and Pumbaa becomes his merry man, "Little Hog" to reclaim the gold rocks from Claim-Jumper Quint. Timon and Pumbaa become sheriffs of a western town when the outlaws, Mad Dog McGraw and his minions, Billy the Goat and Three-fingered Jackalope, invade.
60	14	"All Pets Are Off"	Brad Neave	Scott M. Gimple	Travis Cowsill, Luisito Escauriaga & Maurice Sherwood	April 2, 1999
60	14	"Boary Glory Days"	Brad Neave	Gene Grillo	Travis Cowsill, Luisito Escauriaga & Maurice Sherwood	April 2, 1999
While in New York City, Timon and Pumbaa become pets to a rich kid in order to eat some cockroaches. However, it does not work out as they hoped and the two try to go outside to eat the cockroaches they see in the window. To prevent Pumbaa from bothering him in his bug hunt, Timon lies to him saying that his current age is considered to be old age. He then feels guilty and tries to make Pumbaa feel young again by playing games, such as coconut football and predator tag with Cheetata and Cheetato.
61	15	"Two for the Zoo"	Brad Neave	Don Gillies, Kevin Hopps & Joan Considine Johnson	Lazarino Baarde, Marlon Deane, David Earl & Gord McBride	April 9, 1999
61	15	"The Swine in the Stone"	Brad Neave	Drew Daywalt & David Schneider	Lazarino Baarde, Marlon Deane, David Earl & Gord McBride	April 9, 1999
When trying to be captured by Quint for his zoo, Timon and Pumbaa unwittingly help him capture an Eastern green mamba snake, an East African lion, a black rhinoceros, a mountain gorilla, and a White-backed vulture. While a knight version of Quint is at lunch, Timon and Pumbaa have to get a sword out of a stone for him before a dragon attacks.
62	16	"You May Have Already Won Six Million Bakra"	Brad Neave	Richard Gitelson	Lazarino Baarde, Marlon Deane & Glen Lovett	April 16, 1999
62	16	"My Meteor, My Friend"	Brad Neave	Jeff Abel & Michael Keyes	Lazarino Baarde, Marlon Deane & Glen Lovett	April 16, 1999
Pumbaa becomes a millionaire through a lottery ticket while Timon remains poor. Fed up with Timon doing the all taking and no giving, Pumbaa becomes friends with a meteor, which makes Timon jealous and causes him to find a new friend.
63	17	"Jungle Slickers"	Brad Neave	Tracy Berna	Travis Cowsill, David Earl, Luisito Escauriaga, Glen Lovett, Gord McBride & Maurice Sherwood	April 23, 1999
63	17	"Don't Wake the Neighbear"	Brad Neave	Henry Gilroy	Travis Cowsill, David Earl, Luisito Escauriaga, Glen Lovett, Gord McBride & Maurice Sherwood	April 23, 1999
Timon and Pumbaa go to Kansas to become farmers. Timon doesn't like that job at first, but then starts getting into it. Timon and Pumbaa are throwing a party at Pumbaa's aunt's house, but are threatened by Mr. Bear, who is trying to sleep. They are forced to be quiet as a result, but Timon must prevent his buddies from being noisy as well.
64	18	"Recipe for Disaster"	Brad Neave	Roger Reitzel	Travis Cowsill, Luisito Escauriaga & Maurice Sherwood	April 30, 1999
64	18	"Going Over-Boar'd"	Brad Neave	Barry Hawkins	Travis Cowsill, Luisito Escauriaga & Maurice Sherwood	April 30, 1999
Timon and Pumbaa create a salsa recipe out of bugs and become famous because of it. But Pumbaa finds it difficult when Timon entrusts him to avoid exposing their secret recipe. While on a cruise ship, Timon and Pumbaa fight over who should be captain, and accidentally set the ship in motion.
65	19	"Ivy Beleaguered"	Brad Neave	Etan Cohen	David Earl, Glen Lovett & Gord McBride	May 7, 1999
65	19	"Broadway Bound & Gagged"	Brad Neave	Ford Riley	David Earl, Glen Lovett & Gord McBride	May 7, 1999
Timon and Pumbaa go to college, but the students like Pumbaa more than Timon. Timon and Pumbaa compete against each other to make the best Broadway play.
66	20	"Steel Hog"	Brad Neave	James Bates	Lazarino Baarde, Marlon Deane, Luisito Escauriaga & Maurice Sherwood	May 14, 1999
66	20	"Dealer's Choice Cut"	Brad Neave	Nicholas Hollander	Lazarino Baarde, Marlon Deane, Luisito Escauriaga & Maurice Sherwood	May 14, 1999
Timon and Pumbaa accidentally bump into a group of Smell's Angels. Rather than killing Pumbaa for beating the leader of the gang in a fight, they ask him to join. While Pumbaa, with the nickname "Beef", is having tons of fun, Timon, with the nickname "Toothpick", misses the old days of Hakuna Matata. Timon plays a game of poker with some of the jungle animals. When Pumbaa is put up for bid against a man from a meat producing business who wins, Timon must rescue Pumbaa from being made into someone's lunch.
67	21	"Space Ham"	Brad Neave	Tracy Berna	Phil Ceasar, David Earl, Glen Lovett & Gord McBride	May 21, 1999
67	21	"You Bet Your Tuhkus"	Brad Neave	Drew Daywalt & David Schneider	Phil Ceasar, David Earl, Glen Lovett & Gord McBride	May 21, 1999
After Timon complains to Pumbaa about always getting picked on, the two get kidnapped by alien gladiators to compete in some gladiator games. Pumbaa later gets homesick, but Timon wants to stay because he has a crush on the king alien's daughter. Timon & Pumbaa are on a game show called "You Bet Your Tuhkus". The salamander host talks the two friends into cheating to win the Tuhkus Trophy. Timon plays along but Pumbaa thinks that it's too wrong.
68	22	"No-Good Samaritan"	Brad Neave	Nick DuBois	Lazarino Baarde, Marlon Deane, Luisito Escauriaga & Maurice Sherwood	May 28, 1999
68	22	"Living in De Nile"	Brad Neave	Michael J. Prescott	Lazarino Baarde, Marlon Deane, Luisito Escauriaga & Maurice Sherwood	May 28, 1999
An African leopard king's daughter mistakes Timon and Pumbaa as the ones who saved her from a spotted hyena. This causes her father to appoint them as her bodyguards. While on their trip to Ancient Egypt, after Timon eats a scarab beetle, Tutun Pharaoh throws Timon and Pumbaa in the pyramid for all eternity.
69	23	"One Tough Bug"	Brad Neave	Michael Ryan	David Earl, Gord McBride & Gary Scott	June 4, 1999
69	23	"Pirates of Pumbzance"	Brad Neave	Drew Daywalt & David Schneider	David Earl, Gord McBride & Gary Scott	June 4, 1999
Timon targets a strong bug to eat while Pumbaa acts like a hippie to prevent Timon from catching it. Timon and Pumbaa get jobs as pirates working for Captain Bloodbeard, but it's not as Pumbaa hoped for.
70	24	"Miss Perfect"	Brad Neave	Etan Cohen	Lazarino Baarde, Marlon Deane, Luisito Escauriaga & Maurice Sherwood	June 11, 1999
70	24	"Hakuna Matata U."	Brad Neave	Nick DuBois	Lazarino Baarde, Marlon Deane, Luisito Escauriaga & Maurice Sherwood	June 11, 1999
Pumbaa mistakenly wins a beauty pageant when a fly gets trapped a machine and begins to neglect Timon. Timon and Pumbaa start a university teaching others about Hakuna Matata. Only a sloth and a smart owl show up to their disbelief.
71	25	"Pig-Malion"	Brad Neave	Gene Grillo	Phil Ceasar, Glen Lovett & Gary Scott	June 18, 1999
71	25	"Why No Rhino"	Brad Neave	Roger Reitzel	Phil Ceasar, Glen Lovett & Gary Scott	June 18, 1999
Timon and Pumbaa enroll in a hedgehog professor's university where Pumbaa is smart and Timon procrastinates. Timon and Pumbaa run a safari to get money from a rich couple, even if it's finding the rare Blue Rhino.
72	26	"War Hogs"	Brad Neave	Steve Roberts & Kevin Hopps	David Earl, Luisito Escauriaga, Gord McBride & Maurice Sherwood	June 25, 1999
72	26	"The Big No Sleep"	Brad Neave	Brian Swenlin	David Earl, Luisito Escauriaga, Gord McBride & Maurice Sherwood	June 25, 1999
Timon and Pumbaa join a warthog army only to find out that a war is starting. Pumbaa keeps Timon up all night to see the Porkeswanees, but them not sleeping attracts the Sandman.
73	27	"Common Scents"	Brad Neave	Bill Matheny	Lazarino Baarde, David Earl & Gord McBride	July 2, 1999
73	27	"Mister Twister"	Brad Neave	Darryl Nickens	Lazarino Baarde, David Earl & Gord McBride	July 2, 1999
When fashion designer Donny Gofigure smells Pumbaa's odor, he finds Pumbaa and suggests that the warthog starts a business selling perfume and become famous, much to Timon's jealousy. Timon and Pumbaa need a job in order to raise the membership fee for the "Bug of the Month" club. When all of Pumbaa's ideas go wrong, Timon suggests becoming tornado watchers, which falls to pieces when a real twister comes along.
74	28	"Don't Be Elfish"	Brad Neave	Tracy Berna	Luisito Escauriaga, Glen Lovett & Maurice Sherwood	July 9, 1999
74	28	"Lights, Camera, Traction"	Brad Neave	Barry Hawkins	Luisito Escauriaga, Glen Lovett & Maurice Sherwood	July 9, 1999
Timon wants a video game for Christmas. So he and Pumbaa get jobs at the mall, Pumbaa being Santa and Timon being an elf. Timon makes kids meet his every need or they won't get to talk to Santa. Then one of Santa's elves shows up and tells Timon that he's on the naughty list. So Timon desperately tries to get on the nice list to get his video game. Pumbaa helps Timon become a movie star to impress a female meerkat.
75	29	"The Running of the Bullies"	Brad Neave	James Bates & Steve Roberts	Phil Ceasar, David Earl, Glen Lovett & Andres Miranda	July 16, 1999
75	29	"Special Defects"	Brad Neave	Jim Markovich	Phil Ceasar, David Earl, Glen Lovett & Andres Miranda	July 16, 1999
While in Spain, Timon agitates El Toro during the Running of the Bulls. Timon & Pumbaa ask for Rafiki's help to fix the problems both hate about each other which keeps going horribly wrong.
76	30	"Wishy Washy"	Brad Neave	Jeff Abel & Michael Keyes	Lazarino Baarde & Dave Pemberton	July 23, 1999
76	30	"Ice Escapades"	Brad Neave	Brian Swenlin	Lazarino Baarde & Dave Pemberton	July 23, 1999
Timon and Pumbaa find a genie's lamp and soon they wish for a million more wishes. After watching a famous polar bear ice skating champion on TV, Timon decides that he and Pumbaa should learn how to ice skate so that they could be the world's famous ice skating champions as well. While Pumbaa is good at skating, Timon isn't and decides to give up his dream, but Pumbaa suggests that he keeps trying.
77	31	"Guru-Some"	Brad Neave	Roger Reitzel	Luisito Escauriaga, Glen Lovett, Andres Miranda & Maurice Sherwood	July 30, 1999
77	31	"Jailhouse Shock"	Brad Neave	Joan Considine Johnson	Luisito Escauriaga, Glen Lovett, Andres Miranda & Maurice Sherwood	July 30, 1999
Pumbaa's sayings cause the jungle's animals to get advice from him. Timon and Pumbaa end up in jail for eating June bugs in July. They end up being cellmates with Little Jimmy and his new friend Mr. Bear.
78	32	"Nearly Departed"	Brad Neave	Nick DuBois	Phil Ceasar, David Earl & Dave Pemberton	August 6, 1999
78	32	"Early Bird Watchers"	Brad Neave	Etan Cohen	Phil Ceasar, David Earl & Dave Pemberton	August 6, 1999
Timon and Pumbaa get stung by a scorpion-like beatle. After learning that its venom is fatal after 24 hours and there is no cure for it, the two try to make their last day the best, with Timon acting nice towards every other animal in the Serengetti and Pumbaa getting the fame and fortune he deserves. However, when the time comes, they realize that the venom has no effect on meerkats or warthogs. Timon wants to try to eat a worm every morning, but as always, a bird swoops in and takes each worm inside its beak. Pumbaa always tries to tell him that no matter what he tries, the early bird always gets the worm.
79	33	"The Spy's the Limit"	Brad Neave	Ford Riley	Lazarino Baarde, Luisito Escauriaga & Maurice Sherwood	August 13, 1999
79	33	"Ready, Aim, Fire"	Brad Neave	Drew Daywalt & David Schneider	Lazarino Baarde, Luisito Escauriaga & Maurice Sherwood	August 13, 1999
After injuring a secret agent, Timon and Pumbaa use his stuff in order to stop Count Down from destroying the sun. Somewhere in the north, Timon and Pumbaa stumble upon a campfire. However, they end up in between extinguishing the fire to prevent getting in trouble with Smolder the Bear (Mr. Bear) and relighting the fire for a French-like Quint.
80	34	"Timoncchio"	Brad Neave	Henry Gilroy	Dave Pemberton, Glen Lovett & Andres Miranda	August 20, 1999
80	34	"Ghost Boosters"	Brad Neave	Tracy Berna	Dave Pemberton, Glen Lovett & Andres Miranda	August 20, 1999
Rafiki places a curse on Timon that causes his tail to grow everytime he brags. After Timon sees an ad in the newspaper, he and Pumbaa decide to go hunt ghosts in a house.
81	35	"Stay Away from my Honey!"	Brad Neave	James Bates, Tedd Anasti & Patsy Cameron	Phil Ceasar, David Earl & Luisito Escauriaga	August 27, 1999
81	35	"Sitting Pretty Awful"	Brad Neave	Steve Roberts	Phil Ceasar, David Earl & Luisito Escauriaga	August 27, 1999
Timon and Pumbaa fall in love with a lady named Leslie Lambeau, but run into conflict with Mr. Bear, who also wants her love. Timon and Pumbaa are hired to babysit triplets.
82	36	"He's A Bad, Bad, Bad Sport"	Brad Neave	Nick DuBois	Lazarino Baarde & Glen Lovett	September 3, 1999
82	36	"Dapper Duck Burgers"	Brad Neave	Tracy Berna	Lazarino Baarde & Glen Lovett	September 3, 1999
Timon becomes a bad sport when Pumbaa repeatedly wins at every game they compete in. Timon and Pumbaa are working at a fast food restaurant called Dapper Duck Burgers. When Mr. Bear confronts them for getting his order wrong, the duo frantically try to correct their mistake to avoid suffering his wrath.
83	37	"It Runs Good"	Brad Neave	Nick DuBois & James Bates	Phil Ceasar, David Earl & Dave Pemberton	September 10, 1999
83	37	"Hot Air Buffoons"	Brad Neave	Ford Riley	Phil Ceasar, David Earl & Dave Pemberton	September 10, 1999
Working as car salesman, Timon and Pumbaa sell a car to Mr. Bear and end up working it to keep him happy. Timon and Pumbaa stumble onto a hot air balloon and end up in a race around the world.
84	38	"Timon in Love"	Brad Neave	Sindy McKay, Tedd Anasti & Patsy Cameron; Story by : Sindy McKay, Michael Keyes & Jeff Abel	Phil Ceasar, Luisito Escauriaga & Lyn Hart	September 17, 1999
84	38	"Kahuna Potato"	Brad Neave	Henry Gilroy	Phil Ceasar, Luisito Escauriaga & Lyn Hart	September 17, 1999
After getting struck by cupid's arrow, Timon looks at his reflection and falls in love... with himself. However, Pumbaa feels a little left out. Timon and Pumbaa get attacked by two bullies who almost look identical to them and ask Rafiki for help. He offers to give them magical bugs to assist them, but they must follow Rafiki's exact directions.
85	39	"Mook Island"	Mauro Casalese & Brad Neave	Nick DuBois	Lazarino Baarde, Phil Ceasar, David Earl & Lyn Hart	September 24, 1999
85	39	"Cliphangers"	Mauro Casalese & Brad Neave	Nick DuBois, James Bates, Jeff Abel, Tracy Berna, etc.	Lazarino Baarde, Phil Ceasar, David Earl & Lyn Hart	September 24, 1999
Because of Timon's rudeness, he and Pumbaa get kicked off a cruise ship, and they sail to a deserted island. There they are greeted by a mad scientist who wants to clone Timon. After trying to get a worm on the Cliffs of Moher, Timon & Pumbaa fall down, nearly plummeting to death, and discuss their past (seen through flashbacks). However, after Pumbaa pulls out an umbrella, the two safely land, and try to eat the worm from before.
