= Helicops =

Helicops may refer to:

- Helicops (snake)
- Helicops (video game)
