= Kevin Schon =

American former voice actor

- Occupation: Voice actor
- Years active: 1982–2020

Kevin Schon is an American former voice actor who is known for his voice-over work in video games, movies and television shows. He is best known as a voice double for Nathan Lane for animated media, most notably as Timon in the Timon & Pumbaa television series and in various other Disney related projects.

== Career ==
He played Frank II and Mirabelle in The Naked Truth and two years after that, he played Daryl O'Melveny in A Kiss Goodnight.

Schon frequently served as a voice double for Nathan Lane. He voiced Timon in Timon & Pumbaa, The Lion Guard, and House of Mouse; Scott Helperman in Teacher's Pet while Lane was busy with The Producers; and Snowbell in Stuart Little and Stuart Little 3: Call of the Wild. For three years, he was the "comedy voice" of the ABC television network, voicing all promos for their comedies (Home Improvement, Drew Carey, Roseanne, and Ellen, among others) and was the promo voice for Politically Incorrect when it moved from cable to ABC. Schon's voice appears in over 40 episodes of Married... with Children, with two on-camera appearances.

He also voiced Lob-Star in Skylanders: Trap Team and Skylanders: SuperChargers, Otto in Ben 10: Omniverse, Roboy in Bubble Guppies, Onyx in Sofia the First, Dead-Eye in Jumanji, various villains in The Incredible Hulk, Muk and Luk in the Balto franchise, and Pongo in 101 Dalmatians: The Series.

In late 2003, Schon produced More, an autobiographical one-woman show written and performed by Yeardley Smith at the Union Square Theatre in New York City. It was critically acclaimed, but financially unsuccessful.

In September 2004, Schon co-produced the West End production of Bat Boy: The Musical at the Shaftesbury Theatre in London. That November, film director John Landis was attached to direct a film version of the musical.

As of 2020, Schon has retired from voice acting and now lives in Palm Springs.

== Filmography ==
=== Television ===
Year	Title	Role	Notes
1992–1993	Teenage Mutant Ninja Turtles	Merdude, Alim Coelacanth, Wesley Knight, Landor	2 episodes
1993–1995	Married... with Children	TV Announcer, Felix Katt, Mouse Lawyer, Stage Manager, Phil	4 episodes
1994	Skeleton Warriors	Ursak/Guardian	13 episodes
1994	A Kiss Goodnight	Daryl O'Melveny	Television film
1994–1996	The Tick	Feral Boy, Big Shot, Babyboomerangutan, Living Doll, Watt, Proto-Clown, various voices	17 episodes
1995	The Baby Huey Show	Papa	Episode: "Superhero Huey"
1996–1999	Timon & Pumbaa	Timon	Main cast
1996	The Incredible Hulk	Glenn Talbot, Zzzax, Abomination, Samuel LaRoquette, Judge	7 episodes
1996	Wing Commander Academy	Thrakhath, Blizzard	6 episodes
1997	Jumanji	Deadeye	Episode: "An Old Story"
1997	The Angry Beavers	Patron	Episode: "H-2 Whoa"
1997–1998	Cow and Chicken	Various voices	2 episodes
1997–1998	101 Dalmatians: The Series	Pongo	Main cast (22 episodes)
1998	Rugrats	Announcer, Weatherman	Episode: "Sleep Troubles"
2001–2002	House of Mouse	Timon, Happy	21 episodes
2001-2002	Teacher's Pet	Spot Helperman	8 episodes
2003	Stuart Little	Snowbell	11 episodes
2013	Ben 10: Omniverse	Otto	Episode: "OTTO Motives"
2013–2014	Bubble Guppies	Roboy	6 episodes
2015	Sofia the First	Onyx	Episode: "Minimus Is Missing"
2016–2019	The Lion Guard	Timon, Chungu, Thurston	40 episodes

=== Film ===
Year	Title	Role	Notes
1992	The Naked Truth	Frank II	
1999	The Nuttiest Nutcracker	Stash	
2001	Mickey's Magical Christmas: Snowed in at the House of Mouse	Timon	Direct-to-video
2002	Balto II: Wolf Quest	Muk, Luk, Wolverine	Direct-to-video
2005	Balto III: Wings of Change	Muk, Luk, Mr. Simpson	Direct-to-video
2006	Stuart Little 3: Call of the Wild	Snowbell	Direct-to-video
2009	Jack and the Beanstalk	Officer What	

=== Video games ===
Year	Title	Role	Notes
1995	Timon & Pumbaa's Jungle Games	Timon	
1996	JumpStart 2nd Grade	CJ, Arvin	
1997	JumpStart Math for Second Graders	CJ	
1998	Disney's Adventures in Typing With Timon and Pumbaa	Timon	
1999	Disney's Villains' Revenge	Peter Pan, In	
2001	The Lion King: Simba's Mighty Adventure	Timon	
2003	Disney's Extreme Skate Adventure	Timon	
2014	Infamous Second Son	Activist	
2014	Skylanders: Trap Team	Lob-Star	
2015	Battlefield Hardline	Additional voices	
2015	Skylanders: SuperChargers	Lob-Star	
2016	Skylanders: Imaginators	Lob-Star	
2016	Doom	VEGA, UAC Soldier, additional voices	
2020	Doom Eternal	VEGA	
