= Timon & Pumbaa (TV series) =

American animated television series

- Also known as: The Lion King's Timon & Pumbaa
- Genre: Adventure; Comedy; Slapstick
- Based on: The Lion King
- Developed by: Bobs Gannaway; Tony Craig
- Voices of: List: Ernie Sabella Nathan Lane Quinton Flynn Kevin Schon Cam Clarke Robert Guillaume Edward Hibbert Rob Paulsen Jim Cummings Tress MacNeille Corey Burton Charlie Adler Nancy Cartwright April Winchell Frank Welker S. Scott Bullock Brian Cummings Townsend Coleman Brad Garrett Gilbert Gottfried Jeff Bennett Jess Harnell Phil LaMarr
- Theme music composer: Elton John (music); Tim Rice (lyrics)
- Opening theme: "Hakuna Matata"
- Ending theme: "Hakuna Matata" (instrumental)
- Composer: Stephen James Taylor
- Country of origin: United States
- Original language: English
- No. of seasons: 3
- No. of episodes: 85 (171 segments) (list of episodes)

Production
- Executive producers: Tedd Anasti (season 3); Patsy Cameron (season 3)
- Producers: Bobs Gannaway (seasons 1-2); Tony Craig (seasons 1-2); Chris Bartleman (season 3); Blair Peters (season 3)
- Editor: John Royer
- Running time: 22 minutes
- Production companies: Walt Disney Television; Walt Disney Television Animation (Note: Animation outsourced to Jaime Diaz Productions, Koko Enterprises, Rough Draft Korea, Sunmin Image Pictures, Sunwoo Animation, Toon City, Toonz Animation, Walt Disney Animation Australia, Studio B Productions, Morning Sun Animation and Wang Film Productions.)

Original release
- Network: Syndication; CBS
- Release: September 8, 1995 – November 25, 1996
- Network: Toon Disney
- Release: January 1 – September 24, 1999

Related
- The Lion King; The Lion King II: Simba's Pride; The Lion King 1½; The Lion Guard

The Lion King's Timon & Pumbaa is an American animated buddy comedy television series produced by Walt Disney Television Animation. It was based on Disney Animation's 1994 film The Lion King, centering on Timon the meerkat and Pumbaa the warthog as they continue to live by their problem-free philosophy hakuna matata. Compared to most other The Lion King media, the tone of the series is more slapstick comedy-oriented.

Ernie Sabella reprised his role as Pumbaa for the show's entire run, while Nathan Lane reprised his role as Timon in ten episodes, the last of which being "Paraguay Parable".

The show ran for three seasons, with the first two as part of the syndicated The Disney Afternoon block, CBS, and the third season on Toon Disney. It aired from September 8, 1995, to September 24, 1999. It is the first Lion King-related media to feature on-screen appearances by humans. It is also the first of two television series to be based on the film, the second being The Lion Guard (2016–2019).

Bobs Gannaway and Tony Craig, who would later work on shows like 101 Dalmatians: The Series, House of Mouse, and Lilo & Stitch: The Series, served as the show's executive producers for the first two seasons. As of Season 3, the series was produced by Chris Bartleman and Blair Peters, with Tedd and Patsy Cameron-Anasti (who have previously worked on DuckTales and The Little Mermaid TV series) serving as the executive producers.

== Premise ==
The show stars Timon, a meerkat, and Pumbaa, a warthog, both characters from The Lion King. Taking place after the events of the movie, Timon and Pumbaa continue to live according to the hakuna matata lifestyle, as they venture beyond the Pride Lands and go on adventures. From the jungles of Africa to other places around the world: Europe, Asia, Australia, and Americas, the duo is shown being on various quests and misadventures, either in search for food, fun, napping spots, valuables, and as well as escape from danger such as predators, encountering various new allies and enemies throughout their journey. Whereas the show focuses on Timon and Pumbaa, Simba makes appearances in some episodes, often accompanying Timon and Pumbaa. Additionally, two episodes are focused on Zazu, and four episodes center respectively on Rafiki and the hyena trio Shenzi, Banzai, and Ed, named Rafiki Fables (Note: Often credited as Rafiki's Fables.) and The Laughing Hyenas.

== Episodes ==
Season	Segments	Episodes		Originally released		
Season	Segments	Episodes		First released	Last released	Network
1	26	25	13	September 8, 1995	December 29, 1995	Syndicated
1	24	25	12	September 16, 1995	December 16, 1995	CBS
2	24	21	13	September 2, 1996	November 25, 1996	Syndicated
2	16	21	8	September 14, 1996	November 9, 1996	CBS
3	78	39		January 1, 1999	September 24, 1999	Toon Disney

== Characters ==
=== Main ===
- Timon (voiced in early episodes by Nathan Lane, reprising his role from The Lion King, Quinton Flynn in Season 1 and Kevin Schon in Seasons 2–3) is one of the show's two main protagonists. Schon later provided Timon's voice in The Lion Guard.
- Pumbaa (voiced by Ernie Sabella) is one of the show's two main protagonists. Sabella reprises his role from The Lion King.

=== The Lion King alumni ===
The following additional characters from The Lion King appear in this series:

- Simba (voiced by Cam Clarke) was the protagonist of the original The Lion King film and best friend of Timon and Pumbaa and the son of the late Mufasa. He is the current king of the Pridelands after overthrowing his uncle Scar as revenge for Mufasa's brutal demise Simba witnessed as a cub. In the series, he occasionally is the voice of reason around Timon and Pumbaa's antics. Clarke later provided Simba's singing voice in The Lion King II: Simba's Pride.
- Rafiki (voiced by Robert Guillaume) is a wise mandrill who gives good advice. Guillaume reprises his role from The Lion King.
- Zazu (voiced by Edward Hibbert) is a pompous hornbill who works as Simba's majordomo as well as jungle administrator. Edward Hibbert later provided Zazu's voice in The Lion King II: Simba's Pride and The Lion King 1½.
- Shenzi, Banzai, and Ed (voiced by Tress MacNeille, Rob Paulsen, and Jim Cummings respectively) are three buffoonish hyenas who are the late Scar's former henchmen and are usually spending their time looking for food, though their attempts to get it tend to backfire. Cummings reprises his role of Ed from The Lion King, with Paulsen and MacNeille replacing Cheech Marin and Whoopi Goldberg as Banzai and Shenzi, respectively.
- Gopher (voiced by Ernie Sabella) is Zazu's chief lieutenant. He was portrayed by Jim Cummings in The Lion King.

=== Supporting ===
- Speedy (voiced by Corey Burton imitating Bing Crosby) is a laid-back blue snail who can talk and sing. Timon and Pumbaa originally planned to eat him, but ended up becoming friends with him instead. They often find themselves rushing to have to save Speedy from dangerous situations.
- Fred (voiced by S. Scott Bullock) is a maniacal meerkat who is an old friend of Timon. He loves to laugh and play around, as well as pulling practical jokes. He often uses Timon and Pumbaa as his victims, although they don't find his jokes very funny.
- Boss Beaver (voiced by Brad Garrett) is a stereotypical beaver whose life philosophy is the exact opposite of Hakuna Matata. He values hard work and is sometimes too harsh on his employees. He also emphasizes the importance of safe work conditions.
- Irwin (voiced by Charlie Adler) is a dimwitted, accident-prone penguin whose bad luck seems to be terribly contagious. Timon and Pumbaa became his friends after they were stranded in Antarctica and Irwin had two extra tickets to a cruise ship. They will try to avoid him at all costs.

=== Antagonists ===
- Quint (voiced by Corey Burton) is Timon and Pumbaa's human archenemy and the main antagonist of the series. He is a man of many disguises and his role varies from episode to episode, from mildly bothersome antagonist to full villain.
- Toucan Dan (voiced by Jeff Bennett) is a criminal toucan, wanted by the police. He is known for being a sly con-artist and always manages to trick Timon and Pumbaa (or, as seen in his debut episode, only Timon) into helping him in his schemes and cons.
- Cheetata and Cheetato (voiced by Rob Paulsen and Jim Cummings respectively) are a pair of sophisticated cheetahs who hunt for their prey, enemies of Timon and Pumbaa and of Shenzi, Banzai and Ed. Although hard to tell apart, aside from their voices, Cheetata appears to be more eager and aggressive while Cheetato seems more likely to think things through and is the most conniving.
- Smolder the Bear (voiced by Jim Cummings) is a large brown bear with a very short temperament who Timon and Pumbaa often run into. He can be quite menacing and dangerous, but at least one episode shows that deep inside he is a nice guy.
- The Three Natives (voiced by Jeff Bennett) are a trio of natives who are really university students. Their "chief" is also a university student, and usually precedes what he says with "Bungala bungala!"
- Little Jimmy (voiced by Joe Alaskey) is a cute yet dangerous bluebird who is a criminal mastermind. He also has two voices: a cute, innocent voice to pass himself off as a hatchling and a gruff voice to prove his true maturity.

== History ==
=== Production ===
On January 24, 1995, it was announced that a Lion King television series starring Timon and Pumbaa was set to premiere during the fall, as part of The Disney Afternoon. Gary Krisel, who was then president of Walt Disney Television Animation, found Timon and Pumbaa to be the best new comedy team to come on the scene for a long time and that they had the potential to be just as classic as Abbott and Costello, Hope and Crosby, Martin and Lewis, and Nichols and May.

Bobs Gannaway and Tony Craig were the supervising producers for the show, and instead of recreating the lush, lyrical tone of the movie weekly, they decided to shape the series in a more Tex Avery-ish vein. Gannaway explained that he and Craig wanted to expand on Timon and Pumbaa's personalities as a comedy team to keep the series fresh and to keep the show interesting, they decided to not have Timon and Pumbaa be locked into the Serengeti, but allow them to explore the world and meet different kinds of animals. According to one of the show's writers Kevin Campbell, at the beginning of the series, he and Gannaway made a giant list of puns using country names to open the doors on how many places they could go. After figuring out which funny animal or obstacle situation Timon and Pumbaa would face, they used a "Which Animals Live Where" atlas reference book to find where in the world an episode could take place and check a list of country puns they could pick.

The show was one of the last Disney productions to air on CBS, which had a cross-promotion agreement with Disney, as Disney bought ABC in 1996, the same year that this show (and all other Disney properties still airing on CBS at the time) left the network. Also, in 1995, Westinghouse acquired CBS outright for $5.4 billion. As one of the major broadcasting group owners of commercial radio and television stations (as Group W) since 1920, Westinghouse proceeded to transform itself from its legendary role as a diversified conglomerate with a strong industrial heritage into a media giant with its purchase of CBS. Music underscore by Stephen James Taylor featuring frequent use of a microtonal xylophone and pan pipes based on an African tribal tuning.

=== Animation ===
Animation production was done by a consortium of overseas animation studios, including Walt Disney Animation Australia, Toon City, Wang Film Productions, Thai Wang Film Productions, Rough Draft Korea Co., Ltd., Sunmin Image Pictures Co., Sunwoo Animation, Koko Enterprises, Toonz Animation, Gnome Productions, Jaime Diaz Productions, Golden Key Animation, Project X Animation, Shanghai Morning Sun Animation and Studio B Productions.

=== Broadcast ===
The first two seasons of the show aired simultaneously on The Disney Afternoon and CBS, whereas the third and final season aired on Toon Disney. Reruns of the series aired on Disney Channel from 1997 to 2008. Reruns were shown on Toon Disney up until the channel's demise on February 8, 2009. As a result, the show went off the air for three years.

While the show aired on Disney Channel and Toon Disney, certain episodes from its original run were never re-aired or had scenes edited out, likely for content reasons. For example, "Catch Me if You Kenya" originally had a scene with the butterfly collector returning to his tree house from China and threatening Timon and Pumbaa to put them in a collection for releasing the butterflies. That scene was removed from reruns due to his clothing and appearance evoking Asian stereotypes. The scene was eventually reinstated when the show became available on the Disney+ streaming service since its launch on November 12, 2019.

On March 23, 2012, the show returned to television when Disney Junior was launched as its own channel. However, only selected episodes were shown and some episodes were abruptly edited (presumably due to scenes being deemed inappropriate for preschoolers). As of 2014, the show was removed from the channel. In Russia, however, the show continued to air until the channel closed in 2022.

=== Marketing ===
Upon its premiere in the United States, the show was accompanied with a marketing campaign, which include promotional tie-ins with Burger King (the same promotional partner for the original theatrical and home video releases of The Lion King), KFC and Campbell's through its Franco-American brand's SpaghettiOs.

== Music ==
Name	Notes
"The Lion Sleeps Tonight"	Music video
"Yummy Yummy Yummy"	Music video
"Stand by Me"	Music video
"Alone Together"	From the episode "Once Upon a Timon"
"Beethoven's Whiff"	Musical episode
"Bumble in the Jungle"	Musical episode

== Home media ==
=== VHS releases ===
==== North American releases ====
Six VHS cassettes containing 18 episodes were released in the United States and Canada under the name Timon & Pumbaa's Wild Adventures. Also in the same two North American countries, a double-feature LaserDisc contains the series' first two volumes, Hangin' with Baby and Grub's On.

VHS name	Season(s)	Episode count	Release date	Episodes include	Stock number
Hangin' With Baby	1	3	January 30, 1996	"Never Everglades"; "To Kilimanjaro Bird"; "Rafiki Fables: Good Mousekeeping"	6705
Grub's On	1	3	January 30, 1996	"Saskatchewan Catch"; "French Fried"; "The Laughing Hyenas: Big Top Breakfast"	6706
True Guts	1	3	January 30, 1996	"The Pain in Spain"; "How to Beat the High Costa Rica"; "The Laughing Hyenas: Cooked Goose"	6709
Don't Get Mad, Get Happy	1	3	May 8, 1996	"Yosemite Remedy"; "Kenya Be My Friend?"; "Rafiki Fables: The Sky Is Calling"	6711
Live & Learn!	1	3	May 8, 1996	"The Law of the Jungle"; "Uganda Be an Elephant"; "Be More Pacific"	7646
Quit Buggin' Me	1	3	May 8, 1996	"Frantic Atlantic"; "Swiss Missed"; "Going Uruguay"	7647

==== International releases ====
Three titles containing 21 episodes were released in Europe, Australia and New Zealand, Asia, the Middle East, South Africa, and South America each containing six episodes and a music video. These three titles were released on VHS, LaserDisc, Video CD and DVD. The first release, Around the World with Timon And Pumbaa, features an original story told through bridging sequences in which, after Pumbaa develops amnesia from a lightning strike, Timon tries to restore his friend's memory through the episodes featured on that video.

VHS name	Episode titles	Release date
Around the World with Timon & Pumbaa	"Boara Boara" "Yukon Con" "Saskatchewan Catch" "Stand by Me" (music video episode) "Brazil Nuts" "Truth or Zaire" "Never Everglades"	September 12, 1996; Re-released: June 7, 2004
Dining Out with Timon & Pumbaa	"French Fried" "Russia Hour" "Swiss Missed" "To Kilimanjaro Bird" "Don't Break the China" "Rocky Mountain Lie" "Yummy Yummy Yummy" (music video episode)	August 15, 1997; Re-released: March 14, 2005
On Holiday with Timon & Pumbaa	"Kenya Be My Friend?" "South Sea Sick" "Uganda Be an Elephant" "The Pain in Spain" "How to Beat the High Costa Rica" "You Ghana Join the Club" "The Lion Sleeps Tonight" (music video episode)	August 15, 1997; Re-released: March 14, 2005

=== Video on demand ===
==== United States ====
The series was made available in its entirety on Disney+ since its November 12, 2019 launch, in remastered high definition.

==== International ====
The first two seasons of the show was made available on the DisneyLife streaming service in the United Kingdom.

The entire series is currently available for purchase on Amazon Instant Video in Germany.

The series is available in its entirety on Disney+, where the streaming service is available.

== Accolades ==
Year	Award	Category	Nominee(s)	Result
1996	Daytime Emmy Awards	Outstanding Sound Mixing - Special Class	Melissa Ellis Jim Hodson Dan Hiland Joseph D. Citarella Bill Koepnick Deb Adair Allen L. Stone	Nominated
1996	Daytime Emmy Awards	Outstanding Performer in an Animated Program	Nathan Lane: For playing Timon	Won
1996	Daytime Emmy Awards	Outstanding Performer in an Animated Program	Ernie Sabella: For playing Pumbaa	Nominated
1997	Daytime Emmy Awards	Outstanding Individual in Animation	Kexx Singleton: For the episode "Beethoven's Whiff"	Won
1997	Daytime Emmy Awards	Outstanding Sound Mixing - Special Class	Deb Adair Jim Hodson Melissa Ellis Michael Beiriger Dan Hiland Joseph D. Citarella Allen L. Stone Michael Jiron	Won
1997	Daytime Emmy Awards	Outstanding Music Direction and Composition	Stephen James Taylor	Nominated
1997	Daytime Emmy Awards	Outstanding Sound Editing - Special Class	Bill Kean Thomas A. Harris Fil Brown David Lynch Robbi Smith Brian F. Mars Eric Hertsguaard Kris Daly Michael Warner Phyllis Ginter William Griggs Jennifer Mertens	Nominated
1997	Annie Awards	Best Individual Achievement: Storyboarding in a TV Production	Bob Logan: For the episode "Bumble in the Jungle"	Nominated
1997	Annie Awards	Best Individual Achievement: Directing in a TV Production	Roberts Gannaway; Tony Craig: For the episode "Bumble in the Jungle + Beethoven's Whiff / Mind Over Matterhorn"	Nominated
1997	Annie Awards	Best Achievement in Production Design	Mike Moon: For the episode "Bumble in the Jungle"	Nominated
1997	Annie Awards	Best Achievement in Production Design	Kexx Singleton: For the episode "Beethoven's Whiff"	Nominated
1997	Annie Awards	Best Achievement in Production Design	Sy Thomas Tex: For the episode "Bumble in the Jungle"	Nominated
1997	Annie Awards	Best Individual Achievement: Character Animation	Bob Baxter	Nominated
1997	Humanitas Prize	Children's Animation	Roberts Gannaway: For the episode "Once Upon a Timon"	Nominated
2000	Golden Reel Awards - Motion Picture Sound Editors	Best Sound Editing - Television Animated Series - Sound	Jennifer Mertens Charles Rychwalski Eric Hertsguaard Rick Hammel Kenneth Young David Lynch: For the episode "War Hogs / The Big No Sleep"	Nominated
2000	Golden Reel Awards - Motion Picture Sound Editors	Best Sound Editing - Television Animation - Music	Fil Brown; Liz Lachman: For the episode "Hot Air Buffoons"	Nominated
2000	Golden Reel Awards - Motion Picture Sound Editors	Best Sound Editing - Television Animation - Music	Brian F. Mars; Liz Lachman: For the episode "Steel Hog / Dealer's Choice Cut"	Nominated

== Other media ==
=== Video games ===
Game	Publisher	Platform	Release date
Timon & Pumbaa's Jungle Games	THQ (SNES); Disney Interactive (PC)	Super NES; Microsoft Windows	November 1997 (SNES); December 15, 1995 (Windows)

== Impact and legacy ==
Some of the show's crew returned for The Lion King II: Simba's Pride, The Lion King 1½, and The Lion Guard. Show writer Ford Riley went on to develop the latter, and has since been a series creator, writer and lyricist on many Disney properties. Kevin Schon, who voiced Timon in the series as of its second season, reprised his role as the character in The Lion Guard (as well as its pilot film), along with some other related media, such as House of Mouse. Edward Hibbert continued to voice Zazu in the two direct-to-video follow-ups to The Lion King.

Much of the show's staff members (including executive producers Tony Craig and Bobs Gannaway) went on to work on House of Mouse and Lilo & Stitch: The Series.

=== References in other media ===
- A scene from the episode "Uganda Be an Elephant" is shown in the 2000 Disney Channel Original Movie Stepsister from Planet Weird.
- The title card artwork for the two Zazu-centered episodes is referenced in the House of Mouse episode "King Larry Swings in".
