= Charles Otte =

- Born: May 22, 1956 (age 69); Cleveland, Ohio, United States
- Genres: Theatrical production and direction, Theatrical design, Education
- Occupation: Director/Producer/Educator
- Years active: 1980–present

Charles Otte (born May 22, 1956) is an American theatre director, producer, designer and educator. He is best known as a theatre and multi-media director working in New York and Los Angeles. Otte was born in Cleveland Ohio. He received a B.A. from the University of Virginia, and an M.F.A. from the University of Southern California.

Otte's theatrical career includes work at the Guthrie Theatre, Lincoln Center, the Alliance Theatre, Ensemble Studio Theatre, La Mama ETC, Los Angeles Opera, Houston Opera, Brooklyn Academy of Music, Carnegie Hall, the Ohio Theatre, and the Open Fist Theatre. From 1984 to 1990 he was the artistic director for Project III Ensemble Theatre and later was artistic director for Mojave Group from 1991 to 1996. He is currently co-Artistic Director for Zoo District Theatre in Los Angeles.

Major theatrical productions include James Joyce's The Dead by Richard Nelson, Travesties by Tom Stoppard, Bulgakov's Flight, and Three Penny Opera, Goose and Tomtom by David Rabe, Brecht's Baal Philip Glass’s multi-media opera La Belle et La Bete. Additional work with Glass included staging the international tour of Einstein on the Beach (for Robert Wilson) , staging Songs from Liquid Days, The Civil Wars (again for Wilson), and The Juniper Tree (for Andrei Serban).

Otte produced the CD-ROM game, Monty Python & the Quest for the Holy Grail for 7th Level in 1996 and was named one of the Top 100 producers of the year. Screenwriting and film directing credits include Blind Faith, I Am Not a Ghost, Mission Invisible, Biography for A&E, and Beer Nutz for HDTV.

As a multi-media creative director for BRC Imagination Arts, Otte was Co-Creative Director for the Abraham Lincoln Presidential Museum and Library in Illinois where he created stage/film productions, historical interactive kiosks, and oversaw copy and design elements. The museum occupies two city blocks and includes such high level artifacts as the Gettysburg Address and Lincoln's Second Inaugural Address within the collection. Also produced by BRC, his production of The Star of Destiny is on permanent exhibit in the Texas State History Museum in Austin. His work can also be seen at Lotte World in Seoul, Korea, and at Resorts World in Singapore.

Otte received the Themed Entertainment Award for Outstanding Achievement in 2002 for the Star of Destiny, and again in 2006 for the Abraham Lincoln Presidential Library and Museum. He has received the LA Weekly Award for comedy direction for Travesties, and been nominated on numerous occasions.

Otte is currently on the faculty at the Savannah College of Art and Design teaching Themed Entertainment Design.
