= Le sens de la vie (disambiguation) =

Le sens de la vie is the French equivalent of Meaning of life, the concept concerning the possible purpose and significance that may be attributed to human existence and one's personal life.

Le sens de la vie may also refer to:

- "Le sens de la vie", a 2012 single by French singer Tal
- Le sens de la vie, 1889 novel by French-Belgian novelist Edouard Rod
- Le sens de la vie, 1968 work by Belgian writer Marcel Lecomte
- Le sens de la vie, 1994 novel by French actress and talk show host Brigitte Lahaie
- Le sens de la vie, a 2008 book in the comics series Titeuf by Zep
- Monty Python: Le sens de la vie, the French language title of Monty Python's The Meaning of Life

== See also ==
- Meaning of life (disambiguation)
