= NT =

NT or nt may refer to:

== Language ==
- Nt (digraph), a letter in several African languages
- n't, a contracted form of the English word not

== Arts, entertainment, and media ==
=== Music ===
- Neighbor tone, a nonchord tone that passes from a chord tone directly above or below it and resolves to the same tone
- "N.T.", a song by Kool & the Gang from the 1971 album Live at PJ's
- "N.T.", a song by Q-Tip from the 1999 album Amplified

=== Fictional entities ===
- North Takoma, a posited fictional state in which the town of Springfield is located in The Simpsons TV show

=== Other uses in arts, entertainment, and media ===
- Royal National Theatre, London, England
- No Trump, in contract bridge and other card games
- Norrköpings Tidningar, a Swedish newspaper
- NT Corp (abbreviation of Nurdin Tampubolon Corporation), an Indonesian group of companies

== Places ==
- Northern Territory, Australia
- Northwest Territories, Canada
- New Territories, Hong Kong
- Netherlands Antilles (1954–2010), Caribbean, by FIPS 10-4 code
- Saudi Arabian–Iraqi neutral zone (1922–1991), by ISO 3166-1 code

== Physics and chemistry ==
- Nanotesla (nT), an SI unit of magnetic flux density
- Nit (unit) (nt), a non-SI name for a unit of luminance
- Niton (element) (Nt), obsolete name of the element radon

== Biology, psychology, and medicine ==
- Near-threatened species, a category in the IUCN Red List
- FloraNT (Index herbariorum code for Northern Territory Herbarium in Alice Springs)
- nt, nucleotide, a chemical compound making up DNA or RNA. The abbreviation is used to specify DNA/RNA length.
- Neurotransmitter, chemical signals used in communication between neurons
- Intuitive thinker, one of the Myers–Briggs Type Indicators
- Neurotypical or neurologically typical, someone whose brain development and activity are typical
- Normotension, normal level of blood pressure
- Nuchal translucency scan, a sonographic prenatal screening scan

== Computing ==
- Nested Task flag, a flag in the FLAGS register of Intel x86 processors
- Windows NT, a family of operating systems from Microsoft
- NT (cassette), a Sony microcassette-based digital memo recorder
- Analogue Nt, an aftermarket Nintendo Entertainment System

== Telecommunications ==
- Network termination, a device connecting the customer's data or telephone equipment to the local exchange carrier's line
- Nortel (stock symbol: NT), a telecommunications equipment company
- National Telecom Public Company Limited (NT), a Thai state-owned telecommunications company

== Transport ==
- Net tonnage, a measurement used for ships
- Binter Canarias (IATA airline designator)
- Zeppelin NT, a type of German airship manufactured since the 1990s

== Other uses ==
- New Taiwan dollar (NT$ or NT), the currency of Taiwan
- Newfoundland Time, a time zone in Atlantic Canada
- New Testament, the second part of the Christian Bible
- National Trust, a British heritage conservation charity
- New Trier High School, Winnetka, Illinois, United States
- Neurotypical, in relation to neurodiversity

== See also ==
- Neutronium, a hypothetical substance composed purely of neutrons
- Neo Tokyo (disambiguation), a fictional futuristic version of Tokyo
