= The Nuttiest Nutcracker =

1999 animated film

- DVD cover
- Directed by: Diane Eskenazi; Harold Harris
- Based on: The Nutcracker and the Mouse King by E. T. A. Hoffmann; The Nutcracker by Tchaikovsky & Petipa
- Produced by: Dan Krech; Diane Eskenazi
- Starring: Debi Derryberry; Kevin Schon; Cheech Marin; Desirée Goyette; Jim Cummings; Tress MacNeille; Cam Clarke; Phyllis Diller; Jim Belushi; Jeff Bennett
- Music by: David Krystal
- Production companies: Columbia TriStar Home Video; Dan Krech Productions; Pacific Title/Mirage
- Distributed by: Columbia TriStar Home Video
- Release date: October 19, 1999
- Running time: 48 minutes
- Countries: United States; Canada
- Language: English
- Budget: $84,000

The Nuttiest Nutcracker is a 1999 Canadian-American animated direct-to-video Christmas film loosely based on the 1892 ballet The Nutcracker. The film was directed by Harold Harris and stars the voices of Jim Belushi, Cheech Marin, and Phyllis Diller. The film follows a group of anthropomorphic fruits and vegetables. Their goal is to help the Nutcracker's army get a star to the top of a Christmas tree before midnight and stop a rodent army from destroying Christmas. The film was released on home video by Columbia TriStar Home Video on October 19, 1999. A little over two months later, on December 3, 1999, it was broadcast in the United States on the CBS television network.

== Plot ==
On a snowy Christmas Eve, Marie and her brother Fritz are home alone with their Uncle Drosselmeyer. Marie and Fritz's parents are away for the night and Marie is dismayed at having to spend Christmas Eve without them. She then wishes for Christmas to go away forever.

A group of anthropomorphic nuts, Colonel, Mac, Sparkle, Stash, and Gramps, overhear her plight, but become relieved at the scene of Uncle Drosselmeyer giving his niece and nephew Christmas gifts: a cannon for Fritz and a nutcracker doll for Marie. The nuts believe that the doll may be their prince and proceed to tell Little Pea, the youngest of the nuts, the story of how the nutcracker prince's relationship with a princess cursed by a mouse queen had turned him into a wooden figure, revealing that only true love will break the spell. Fritz takes the nutcracker from Marie. A chase up the ladder of the Christmas tree ensues, resulting in the doll falling hard to the floor. Upset by how "hurt" her nutcracker is, Marie turns Fritz away. She forgives her brother later in private, telling her nutcracker that out of all her gifts, she loves him the most. After kissing the doll on the lips, Marie becomes tired and falls asleep.

The nuts fall asleep as well, unaware of being targeted by the mouse queen's son, Reginald. He plans to steal the Christmas star on the top of the tree and take over the Christmas Kingdom. With his army of mice, he attempts to capture the nuts. The nuts fight toy soldiers, who prove no match against the mice. Mac stages a coup d'état with his own army of fruits and vegetables. The foods are eventually exhausted by fighting; Gramps is captured by three mice. Marie, awakened by the battle, sees her doll alive and fighting Reginald. Marie intervenes; Reginald is infatuated with her, but she brushes the mouse off her foot using the Christmas star. However, as the foods celebrate their victory, Marie is magically reduced to the nutcracker prince's height by Uncle Drosselmeyer.

The foods inform Marie that without the Christmas star, Christmas will be "gone forever". Fortunately, Marie still has the star. They head into the Sugar Plum Fairy's kingdom to seek help in getting the star back on the tree. Just as the entourage reaches the fairy's castle, Reginald shows up and captures Marie. Imprisoned in the cheese foundry of Reginald's palace, Marie laments her failure to save Christmas and imagines herself slow dancing with the prince in a chapel to emotional music. She is then summoned by Reginald, who offers to marry her. She refuses, but eventually sympathizes with the mouse king after learning that no one has given him a single Christmas gift.

The prince and the foods arrive at Reginald's palace, adamant on rescuing Marie and the others captured by Reginald's army. The foods are reluctant at first, but agree to sneak into the palace after noticing the prince's courage. Reginald and his sergeant perform a dance number. The prince is reunited with Marie. Chaos ensues when Reginald overhears a black-eyed pea laughing at him for not winning Marie's heart; a chase on flying motorcycles made of crackers and olives follows suit. In the middle of the chase, Reginald's palace starts to collapse. After the foods are rescued, Reginald falls into the cheese river due to his vehicle running out of fuel. Marie, having grown soft for the king, saves him and loses the star in the process. Reginald admits that it was "the first nice thing that anyone had ever done to [him]" before producing the star to Marie.

The group arrives at the Sugar Plum Fairy's castle, where she reveals that the Christmas star is able to grant any wish including the power to bring Marie's parents home. After making her wish, Marie gently tosses the star to the ceiling and the screen fades to white. Marie wakes up to find her parents greeting her along with Uncle Drosselmeyer and a guest resembling the prince. The film ends with Marie and the prince sharing a kiss while Mac and the nuts provide the mistletoe.

== Voice cast ==
- Debi Derryberry as Marie, the protagonist / Fritz, Marie's little brother
- Cam Clarke as the Prince, a nutcracker / Asparagus / The Mouse Sergeant
- Jim Belushi as Reginald the Mouse King
- Cheech Marin as Mac the Macadamia nut
- Phyllis Diller as the Sugar Plum Fairy
- Desirée Goyette as Sparkle, a humanoid nut in a blue dress
- Tress MacNeille as Li'l Pea, a peanut child / Broccoli Floret, a broccoli in a tutu
- Jeff Glen Bennett as Colonel, a peanut / The Mouse Doctor / The Mouse Soldier / Toy Soldier
- James Jonah Cummings as Uncle Drozzelmeyer / Gramps the Walnut
- Kevin Schon as Stash, a cashew with a news reporter hat

== Release ==
The Nuttiest Nutcracker, billed by Columbia TriStar as the first computer-animated direct-to-video feature film, was named as one of the top five DVDs of 1999 by its president at the time, Ben Feingold. To promote the video, which was issued on October 19, 1999 the company did a series of lavish tie-ins with such companies as Hardee's, Carl's Jr. and Blue Diamond Growers. The special, when aired on CBS, finished at 87th place in the Nielsen ratings, with a 5.1 share and over nine million viewers.

The special received marginally positive reviews from those who reviewed it at the time. Alan Levine of The Arizona Republic gave it four stars and called it "just the ticket for 3-to-6-year olds." Tony Atherton of The Ottawa Citizen stated that it was, "among new shows this year, the most likely to become a Christmas tradition", adding that "the story's innovations are not remarkable, but the animation, particularly the backgrounds and use of perspective, is gorgeous. It's the kind of thing you'd like to look at again" Lynne Heffley of the Los Angeles Times remarked that "It's silly and raucous [...] and this computer-musical twist on The Nutcracker Suite tale doesn't match Disney's Toy Story wizardry, but the colorful 3-D visuals are still pretty remarkable." Nancy Churnin of The Dallas Morning News referred to the special as "a delightful, comic romp through familiar territory." A more mixed assessment was provided by Steve Slosarek of The Indianapolis Star, who gave it two and a half stars and said that while it "will hold children's attention", its animation style was "flat". Another mixed review came from Michael Janusonis of The Providence Journal, who remarked that "the mood of The Nuttiest Nutcracker is merry, its songs are lively and its characters zany. But clearly it's not for traditionalists. They may not only carp about changes to the romantic mood of the original story, but complain that the computer-generated animation has rendered all the human characters as though they're made of plastic."

Among those who waxed negative about the special was Jake Sherman of the Boston Herald, who said the following:

Avoid "The Nuttiest Nutcracker" like the remnants of a circus parade. It's a shoddy attempt to combine the computer-generated animation and colorful characters of "Toy Story" with the holiday cheer of "The Nutcracker." It lacks the logic of "Toy Story," with a cast made up of some unconvincing-looking humans and nuts who are dressed wackily - a peanut with a backwards baseball cap on, for example - for no apparent reason. And its filmmakers lack the smarts to keep computer-animated human characters to a bare minimum.

== See also ==
- List of animated feature-length films
- List of Christmas films
- List of computer-animated films
- The Nutcracker
