= The Hunchback of Notre Dame: Topsy Turvy Games =

1996 video game

Disney's The Hunchback of Notre Dame: Topsy Turvy Games
- Developers: 7th Level (Microsoft Windows); Tiertex (Game Boy)
- Publishers: Disney Interactive (Microsoft Windows); THQ (Game Boy)
- Platforms: Microsoft Windows; Game Boy
- Release: Microsoft Windows: US: August 13, 1996; Game Boy: NA: March 1997
- Genre: Party
- Modes: Single-player, multiplayer

Disney's The Hunchback of Notre Dame: Topsy Turvy Games is a 1996 party game developed by 7th Level and published by Disney Interactive Studios for Microsoft Windows. It was released on August 13, 1996. It was the second and final title in Disney's short-lived Gamebreak series following Timon and Pumbaa's Jungle Games (1995). A Game Boy port, titled as Disney's The Hunchback of Notre Dame: 5 Foolishly Fun Topsy Turvy Games, was developed by Tiertex and published by THQ. It had Super Game Boy support and was released in North America in March 1997.

The video game was based on the film The Hunchback of Notre Dame and features a collection of mini-games based on the Festival of Fools.

== Gameplay ==
The game is a collection of mini-games set around Notre Dame Cathedral during the Festival of Fools. The game features sounds and music from the film. In the Windows version, the games are presented by the three gargoyles from the film, Victor, Hugo, and Laverne, who may also give some support. Games can be played by one or two players in the Windows version.

The five games in the Windows version include:

- Chiseler: A Breakout clone in which players play as either Victor or Hugo using stone marble pigeons to chip away bricks covering a humorous piece of art. Players use either a mouse, keyboard, or joystick to move their gargoyle's arm to hit the moving stone pigeon with a paddle. A brick is chipped if a pigeon hits it, however, only the top-most bricks in play can be cleared. If a player's pigeon goes out of play, Laverne will throw in another pigeon after a few seconds. The winning player scores 25 points if they clear their side first; a short animation of the winner's art also plays upon clearing.
- Djali Bowling: Tenpin bowling but with Esmeralda's goat, Djali, taking the place of a bowling ball and "festival fools" (people) as the bowling pins. Players decide on Djali's lane, head butt (representing "spin"), and running speed to see if he can get a strike; if he does so, a monk next to the bowling lane will get dunked in a tub of water. The lane and head butt can be changed before launching Djali, but the run speed–represented by a meter with an arrow pointing at it–can only be set once per "bowl". After all ten frames, a mime appears and moves around the lane to give the player a chance at a free strike, although the player's final score is unaffected whether or not Djali hits the mime.
- Le Food Feud!: Players compete in a food fight by clicking on fools moving around a scene to throw food. Players have a limited amount of time and food to throw at a target number of fools in order to advance to the next stage. Furthermore, some fools will throw food at the player's screen, with splats blocking their view. If the player achieves the target number of fools hit, they then have unlimited food to throw until the end of the round. The game ends if the player fails to hit enough fools in the time limit, runs out of food to throw before reaching the target, or gets too many splats on their screen.
- Upsy Daisy: A fighting game where two players floating on balloons must use air currents from chimneys below to pop the other player's balloons in a best of three one-minute rounds. Players must either pop all their opponent's balloons or pop more of their opponent's balloons when the time runs out to win a round. Furthermore, fools and pigeons will pass by to pop or steal a random player's balloon, while a fool on stilts will try to reach and grab a player to make them vulnerable to attack.
- Inside Outwords: A trivia game where players are given a word, term, or phrase that are "Topsy Turvyized" into their "opposites". Players must buzz in and choose one of three answers to guess the correct answer. In two-player mode, if a player who buzzed in first gives an incorrect answer, the other player has a chance to score by selecting one of the two remaining answers.

The five games in the Game Boy version include:

- Chiseler: Plays identically to the Windows version, but the player plays alone and has a limited number of pigeons to clear the field to score points for every brick broken. The artwork are static images of the film's characters.
- Djali Bowling: Plays identically to the Windows version, though the ten fools are replaced with just six pins that look similar to duckpins, Djali can be better aimed instead of being forced to follow one of five lanes, and he rolls down the lane instead of running. There is also no monk over a dunk tank.
- Catch the Fool: Players must move a trampoline to catch fools falling out of windows and have them bounce back through their window. Players have a limited time to catch a set number of fools. Players also have a boost meter to move faster.
- Upsy Daisy: Plays identically to the Windows version, but there is no time limit; the round ends when the player or their opponent pops all of the other's balloons. No fools appear to steal or pop any balloons.
- Picture Puzzle: A sliding puzzle mini-game with puzzles depicting the film's characters.
- Additionally, a sixth game mode called Funfair has players completing challenges in the other five games.

== Critical reception ==
Coming Soon Magazine gave the game 87 out of 100, concluding "although Hunchback of Notre Dame was first designed for children, the game might appeal as well for adults with its remarkable design. Not only do the graphics look sterling, but also the soundtrack plays admirably with the original music from the film. At no time you will get bored in the game. The hilarious commentaries from the gargoyles will keep you awake, and even the loading sequences feature small animations. Rarely has a game for children been so well made, and no doubt it will be another smash hit for Disney Interactive". Entertainment Weekly described it as having less "charm and originality" than Savoy Pictures' The Adventures of Pinocchio, ultimately giving it a B−.

Electric Playground gave the game a score of 8 out of 10.
