= Take Your Best Shot =

1995 video game

- Developer(s): 7th Level
- Publisher(s): 7th Level
- Platform(s): Windows
- Release: February 1995

Take Your Best Shot is a 1995 video game from 7th Level.

== Gameplay ==
Take Your Best Shot is a darkly comedic multimedia compilation featuring the surreal animations of Bill Plympton. Designed as a stress-relief novelty for corporate environments, it includes games, screen savers, wallpapers, and Windows icons that depict suited businessmen engaging in absurd and violent antics—like mutual decapitation and explosive head-swapping—without consequence.

== Development ==
The game was developed in collaboration with Bill Plympton who developed the characters. It was released in February 1995.

== Reception ==
Reception

Review scores
| Publication | Score |
|---|---|
| All Game Guide | 2.5/5 |
| New York Daily News | 4/4 |
| Star Tribune | B- |
| PC Player | 60/100 |

PC Gamer said "We guarantee that you will laugh, and insist on having someone else see it to believe it. For under $20, this is a novelty well worth having"

Star Tribune gave the game a score of B− stating: "novelty wears off quickly, since game play is limited to a few variations on a standard theme".
