= My Teacher Is an Alien =

Science fiction children's book series

My Teacher Is an Alien is a four-book science fiction children's book series authored by Bruce Coville. The titles include:

- My Teacher Is an Alien (1989)
- My Teacher Fried My Brains (1991)
- My Teacher Glows in the Dark (1991)
- My Teacher Flunked the Planet (1992)

== Plot summary ==
=== My Teacher Is an Alien ===
The plot is about three children, Peter Thompson, who is called a nerd, Susan Simmons, the protagonist, and school bully Duncan Dougal. Susan eventually discovers that Mr. Smith, their teacher, is actually an orange-eyed green alien named Broxholm, who seems to be planning to abduct five students from his class to take back with him. She calls Peter for help, and later Duncan. They later discover that Broxholm's motives are much more complex. Susan had earlier discovered that Broxholm hated music and especially her piccolo. At the end, the heroes publicly reveal Mr. Smith to be Broxholm by having the whole school band start to play "Stars and Stripes Forever" by John Philip Sousa in the auditorium. Broxholm then makes an escape with Peter. Peter went to outer space, like he wanted to. In the end, the lesson is to never give up.

=== My Teacher Fried My Brains ===
Three months later, in My Teacher Fried My Brains, former bully Duncan Dougal discovers an alien's human disguise in the form of a human skin-like glove in a dumpster, which leads him to believe that there is still another alien posing as someone else at the school. While investigating, Duncan participates in an in-class demonstration of static electricity that he comes to believe has made him more intelligent. Since he believes this machine is making him more intelligent, he sneaks into his science classroom after school hours to use it. He gradually becomes a much more thoughtful and considerate person. One day when he is using the machine he discovers an alien creature “Poot” in the classroom refrigerator, which makes him even more suspicious of his science teacher.

One day after school when Duncan was having a terrible day, he goes into his home economics teacher Miss Betty Lou Karpou's classroom to seek advice. During this conversation, Miss Karpou is revealed to be the alien and identifies herself as Kreeblim. She freezes Duncan's body and uses his brain as a means of communication among other aliens in the galaxy who are trying to decide what they want to do with humans. Susan, the hero of the previous story, tries to save Duncan when Kreeblim is out of her house, however the two of them do not get out of the house in time.

At the end of the book, Peter (with enhanced eyesight and no need of glasses) and Broxholm return, and Duncan and Susan decide to help Peter prove to the Interplanetary Council, the ruling aliens of the galaxy, that the human race is worth saving.

=== My Teacher Glows in the Dark ===
Peter explains to Duncan and Susan what happened to him in the last few months, in My Teacher Glows in the Dark.

The story begins in Kennituck Falls, as Peter and Broxholm evade those who are trying to capture the alien, quickly reaching Broxholm's ship and leaving the Earth. They swiftly travel to the far side of the Moon and rendezvous with the starship New Jersey (so named because the ship is the same size as New Jersey). Once on board, Peter is subjected to some rather unsettling albeit benign boarding procedures and finds himself in a truly alien world, on a starship crewed by aliens from various worlds throughout the galaxy. Peter is introduced to the alien Hoo-Lan who undertakes to serve as Peter's teacher to introduce Peter to the intergalactic society he has joined. Hoo-Lan can glow in the dark, giving the book its title, although this doesn't become a plot point (making this the only book in the series where the title isn't a plot point).

Peter quickly learns that the galaxy is stranger than he had previously believed, and also discovers that the assembled alien races think humanity is uncivilized and dangerous, and that humanity is close to discovering the secret of interstellar space flight, greatly worrying the aliens about the damage that humans could do if they discover interstellar travel while still warlike. This has led the aliens to study Earth to find out why we are the way we are, and divided the aliens into factions that variously believe Earth should be left alone, conquered, quarantined, or destroyed.

Peter agrees to have his brain examined, in an effort to determine if humanity's behavior is due to a biological condition. After much study, the aliens discover that Peter is latently and naturally telepathic, which is apparently quite rare in the galaxy. Unfortunately, while attempting to study this further, Hoo-Lan falls into a coma, which the aliens suspect is Peter's doing. Peter goes to a communications room and contacts Duncan to try to warn Earth of the aliens' plans, which makes them even more suspicious, despite that they gave Peter free range of the ship.

The book ends with the aliens agreeing to give Peter and Broxholm one last chance to find some redeeming characteristic of humanity that would save it, apparently having decided that otherwise they will destroy the Earth. Peter and Broxholm return to Earth, setting up their appearance at the end of My Teacher Fried my Brains.

=== My Teacher Flunked the Planet ===
Peter, Susan, and Duncan end up together again with Kreeblim and Broxholm for My Teacher Flunked the Planet, as they decide to join their forces to defend Earth in front of the interplanetary council. After numerous discussions, with Hoo-Lan's help they make the case that humanity needs to largely be left alone to develop independently, while Peter also asks that the council send Earth alien teachers to help them learn and grow, so that Earth can seek the council's approval when it is ready.

== Computer game ==
A computer game based on the series was produced by 7th Level and Byron Preiss Multimedia Company. Players can take the perspective of the three main children in the series, Peter Thompson, Duncan Dougal or Susan Simmons.
