= Monty Python's Complete Waste of Time =

1994 video game

- Developer: 7th Level
- Publisher: 7th Level
- Designer: Monty Python
- Platforms: Macintosh, Windows (95/3.x)
- Release: 4 October 1994; 1995 (Mac)
- Genre: Software toy
- Mode: Single player

Monty Python's Complete Waste of Time is a collection of minigames, screensavers, desktop wallpaper and icons for Mac OS System 7 and Windows released in 1994 by 7th Level, Inc. It was brought on board the Mir Space Station by astronaut Andy Thomas.

== Gameplay ==
Monty Python's Complete Waste of Time is a point-and-click experience in absurdity and irreverence, emulating the anarchic spirit of the original British comedy series, Monty Python's Flying Circus. Created with input from Terry Gilliam, the game is a digital playground filled with references to TV sketches, bizarre animations, and unpredictable interactions. Players explore surreal environments like the Exploratorium, Exploding TV Room, and Portrait Gallery, where clicking on anything might trigger a classic skit like the "Dead Parrot," a strange animation, or even land the player in a penalty box with cheesy music and no clear escape. The game parodies multimedia seriousness, offering a mess of nonsense instead. It also offers a few structured elements, including: the Desktop Pythonizer which lets users decorate their screen with squiggly icons and themed screen savers; arcade-style mini-games which involve dodging flying pigs and their deadly droppings; and a hidden puzzle called the "Secret to Intergalactic Success," which players must uncover and solve on their own, with the promise of prizes like a multimedia PC or $5,000. Even the help button is a joke, offering gags instead of guidance—like a voice explaining that "Help!" was a Beatles song. Overall, the game is a satirical, interactive tribute to Monty Python's legacy, designed more for laughs than logic.

== Development ==
The Mac version of the game was released in October 1995.

== Reception ==
Reception

Review scores
| Publication | Score |
|---|---|
| Entertainment Weekly | A- |
| MacUser | 4.5/5 |

MacUser named Complete Waste of Time one of 1996's top 50 CD-ROMs, and gave it a score of 4.5 out of 5.

Games Domain said "All in all, if you are just looking to kill some time and have some fun, this product fits the bill".

In 1995, it won the Codie award for "Best Strategy Program" from the Software Publishers Association.

== Sales ==
The game shipped more than 50,000 units worldwide by December 1994 and generated over $7 million in revenue.

== See also ==
Release timeline
| 1994 | Monty Python's Complete Waste of Time |
1995
| 1996 | Monty Python & the Quest for the Holy Grail |
1997
| 1998 | Monty Python's The Meaning of Life |

- Monty Python & the Quest for the Holy Grail, a successor based on the film Monty Python and the Holy Grail
- Monty Python's The Meaning of Life, based on the 1983 film of the same name
