= Tracer (video game) =

1996 video game

- Developer: Future Endeavors
- Publisher: 7th Level
- Platform: Windows
- Release: June 25, 1996
- Genre: Puzzle

Tracer is a puzzle video game developed by short-lived Ottawa, Canada studio Future Endeavors and published by 7th Level for Microsoft Windows.

== Gameplay ==
Tracer is an action game with puzzles, in which the player is a contract hacker navigating cyberspace, building pathways across an empty grid by aligning multi‑colored blocks like dominoes. A deadly virus pursues the player, consuming the path behind and forcing constant forward motion. Levels introduce hazards and tools—bridges, zipper pads, bad sectors, code pads, and keys—that complicate route‑building and unlock higher areas. The challenge comes from quick thinking, fast reflexes, and patience, as the puzzles grow tricky early on but offer variety beyond standard block‑matching games.

== Development ==
Tracer was first mentioned in May 1996.

== Reception ==
Reception

Review scores
Publication	Score
All Game Guide	2.5/5
Computer Gaming World	2/5
Computer Games Magazine	2.5/5
GameSpot	6.6/10
PC Gamer	55%
PC Player	5/5
PC Games	19%
Quad-City Times	3/4

Next Generation reviewed the PC version of the game, rating it three stars out of five, and stated that "as far as this sort of thing goes, the game is certainly worth a look." Games Domain recommended Tracer to people who like puzzle games.
