= The Secret of Life =

Secret of Life may refer to:

== Music ==
- "Secret O' Life", a 1977 song by James Taylor
- "The Secret of Life" (song), a 1996 release by Gretchen Peters, recorded in 1998 by Faith Hill
- The Secret of Life (album), a 1996 album by Gretchen Peters
- The Secret of Life: Partners, Volume Two, a 2025 duets album by Barbra Streisand

== Fiction ==
- The Secret of Life (novel), a 2001 sci-fi thriller by Paul J. McAuley

== See also ==
- Meaning of Life (disambiguation)
