= Arcade America =

1996 video game

- Developer: 7th Level
- Publishers: 7th Level; BMG Interactive (Germany)
- Platforms: Windows, Classic Mac OS
- Release: 1996
- Genre: Platform

Arcade America is a platform game developed and published by 7th Level. It was released in 1996 for Windows and Classic Mac OS.

== Plot ==
Joey's band "Joey and the Monsters" is offered a deal to perform at Woodstock. The next day, the monsters try to wake Joey up, but he's a heavy sleeper. They decide to try blowing up his house in order to get him up in time, causing California to get destroyed and sending the monsters flying across America. Now Joey must travel across the US to save his friends and eventually make it to Woodstock in time.

== Gameplay ==
The game stars Joey and his monsters. This is a side scrolling arcade platform game about traveling across America to find all of Joey's missing monsters.

== Development ==
In the German version of Arcade America, German singer & songwriter Nina Hagen voices Joey's mother as well as three other characters; this was a selling point present in advertisements, and is featured on the front cover of the German version of the game.

== Reception ==
Reception

Review scores
Publication	Score
PC Games	82% (Windows)
PC Player	3/5 (Windows)
Next Generation	3/5 (Windows)
PC Joker	56% (Windows)
Computer Game Review	79/74/71

Next Generation reviewed the Windows version of the game, rating it three stars out of five, and stated that "It's an interesting platform puzzler, and some of the challenges will surprise even the most adept gamer. Still, if you're looking for a good action title, there are better ones out there."

German gaming magazine PC Joker gave the Windows version of Arcade America an overall score of 56%, praising the game's "cute" graphics that are "animated with care", as well as the game's humor, but criticized the game's "limited" longevity and 'unoriginal' gameplay, summarizing the game as "getting the character from the bottom to the top of the screen without getting hurt". PC Joker praised Nina Hagen's "first-class" voiceover work and Arcade America's overall "witty" presentation, but expressed that while visually and aurally appealing, Arcade America is "boring".

German gaming magazine PC Player gave the Windows version of Arcade America an overall score of three stars out of five, and PC Games gave 82%.
