= Monty Python's The Meaning of Life (video game) =

1997 adventure video game

- North American Box Art
- Developer: 7th Level
- Publishers: EU: Take-Two Interactive; NA: Panasonic Interactive Media
- Director: Steve Martino
- Producer: Robert Ezrin
- Writer: Bart Jennett
- Platform: Windows
- Release: December 1997
- Genre: Adventure
- Mode: Single player

Monty Python's The Meaning of Life is a 1997 video game developed by 7th Level and published for Microsoft Windows by Take-Two Interactive in Europe and Panasonic Interactive Media in North America. It is based on the 1983 film of the same name, and is a point and click adventure title in which players interact with objects and characters to progress scenes from the film, and complete additional puzzles and minigames. The Meaning of Life was the last of three Monty Python games created by the developer. Upon release, it received mixed contemporary and retrospective reviews, with critics faulting the game's lack of interactivity, difficult puzzles, and bugs that prevented completion of the game.

== Gameplay ==
Gameplay screenshot

The Meaning of Life is an adventure video game in which players navigate scenes with a 360 degree field of view over eight chapters of gameplay. The game is split across multiple discs into three stages across eight chapters: Life, Afterlife, and The Cottage, and use a radial menu named the "Wheel of Life" to select a chapter from the main menu. Life is set as a retelling of the film of the same name, consisting of interactive scenes including animation and full motion video based on content from the film. The Afterlife stage consists of new content designed for the game across three sub-levels, named Material, Spiritual, and Dental. The Cottage consists of the player navigating the summer home of Terry Gilliam and completing puzzles within. Players navigate and interact with scenes by using point and click controls to select interactive objects or people, which animate and progress the game to new areas. Across chapters, players must collect seven objects that, when combined, complete the game and purport to reveal the meaning of life. The game features several minigames interspersed between stages, including You Don't Know John, a trivia game and parody of You Don't Know Jack, in which players must match historical figures to comedic descriptions. The game features the full voice cast of Monty Python actors John Cleese, Terry Gilliam, Eric Idle, Terry Jones and Michael Palin.

== Development ==
The Meaning of Life was developed by Richardson, Texas based development studio 7th Level, and the third in a trilogy of Monty Python-themed titles after Monty Python's Complete Waste of Time and Monty Python & the Quest for the Holy Grail. Following a period of poor commercial performance and contraction, 7th Level announced at Comdex that the company intended to sell distribution rights to the title, which was acquired by Take Two Software, who retained European distribution rights and sold North American rights to Panasonic Interactive Media. 7th Level showcased the game at E3 1997. Terry Gilliam was an executive producer.

== Critical reception ==
Reception

Review scores
Publication	Score
AllGame	4/5
Computer Games Strategy Plus	4/5
Computer Gaming World	2/5
PC PowerPlay	57%
APC	4/5
Just Adventure	C−
PC Force	45%
Ultimate PC	75%

The Meaning of Life received mixed reviews upon release. Some critics appreciated the addition of content beyond the film and adventure gameplay elements, with John Altman of Computer Games Strategy Plus praising there being "real goals to be accomplished". Others felt felt it lacked material, with PC Force writing that the game's interface and control felt like a "lazy interactive ride" due to "animation that goes on and on" and the game overall lacked "depth and longevity". Critics also critiqued the gameplay and limited level of interactivity. Describing the gameplay as "merely a case of methodically clicking on things as they appear", David Wildgoose of PC PowerPlay felt gameplay was tedious and the minigames "fail to hit the mark". Ultimate PC felt the game's repetition was "irritating" and undermined its humour. Whilst critiquing the game's first half as a "sluggish, revolting slog through familiar scenes" and finding its puzzles "confusing and repetitive", Charles Ardai of Computer Gaming World praised the game's Afterlife disc as better in quality due to being more "inventive" than tiresome, featuring a "surreal fantasy world", and displaying more interesting puzzles.

Retrospective reception of The Meaning of Life has also been mixed. Describing the game as "reasonable" compared to its predecessors, Richard Cobbett of PC Gamer praised the size and additional content of the game, although expressed that its minigames were "admittedly dreadful and featured "nasty bugs", making it impossible to finish. Anthony Burch of Destructoid appreciated the game aspired to be a legitimate adventure video game, but felt it "certainly failed" due to its "mind-meltingly hard puzzles", "odd logic" and game-breaking bugs, although found its satirical and surreal qualities merited investigation if "only as a curiosity". Zanandi Botes of Cracked felt the inclusion of new content made the game "somewhat fresh", but critiqued its difficulty and bugs.
