= Disney's Adventures in Typing With Timon and Pumbaa =

- Developer: Disney Interactive
- Publisher: Disney Interactive
- Platforms: Windows; Macintosh
- Release: August 1998
- Genre: Educational

Disney's Adventures in Typing With Timon and Pumbaa is a 1998 video game from Disney Interactive. It was released in August 1998.

== Gameplay ==
Disney's Adventures in Typing With Timon & Pumbaa presents a set of typing-focused activities in which the player practices finger placement, home‑row technique, speed, and accuracy while interacting with characters from The Lion King. The program offers multiple difficulty levels and five distinct typing exercises. As the player progresses, the software provides rewards and brief interactive moments with Timon, Pumbaa, and Rafiki.

== Reception ==
Reception

Review scores
| Publication | Score |
|---|---|
| Chicago Tribune | 3/4 |
| FamilyPC | 88% |
| The Daily Telegraph | 5/5 |

The New York Times liked the visuals and animation in Adventures in Typing. Kids Domain called Adventures in Typing a highly successful combination of tried-and-true typing techniques.
