= Battle Beast (video game) =

1995 video game

- North American cover
- Developer: 7th Level
- Publisher: BMG Interactive
- Platforms: MS-DOS, Windows, Mac OS
- Release: August 19, 1995
- Genre: Fighting
- Modes: Single-player, Multiplayer

Battle Beast is a side-scrolling fighting game released for the PC in 1995.

== Gameplay ==
The player controls animals that transform into fighters in a 2D fighting game, uncovering secret items and performing special moves as the player engages in straightforward one‑on‑one battles.

== Reception ==
Reception

Review scores
Publication	Score
Computer Game Review	92/88/89
Entertainment Weekly	B
Next Generation	3/5
PC Gamer	69%

Reviewing the Windows version, a Next Generation critic called Battle Beast "an incredibly fun and visually stunning fighting game". He complimented the play control, numerous secrets, and most especially the cute, humorous animation, concluding that "At its heart it's still just another 2D fighter, but its light-hearted feel gives it an edge over many of the others out there." He awarded it 3 out of 5 stars. The game received a positive review from Computer Game Review, which concluded, "Finally, a quality fight game worth owning."

Entertainment Weekly gave Battle Beast a B. PC Gamer rated Battle Beast a score of 69% stating that "It's a decent fighting game, but one with significant flaws. CNET called Battle Beast kind of a Kartoon Kombat primer for the beginning gamer.

Battle Beast shipped more than 50,000 units.
