= New New York =

New New York or Neo-New York may refer to:

== Fictional places ==
- New New York, in The Martian Chronicles by Ray Bradbury, New New York is named as one of the early human settlements on Mars.
- New New York, in the novel Do Androids Dream of Electric Sheep? by Philip K. Dick
- New New York, the setting of Futurama
- New New York, in the Doctor Who episodes "New Earth" and "Gridlock", referred to by the Doctor as New New New New New New New New New New New New New New New New York, as it was the 15th New York since the original New York. (In other words, the 16th York since the original York.)
- New New York, a space habitat orbiting Earth in Joe Haldeman's Worlds trilogy (the name shortened to "New New" in daily speech)
- New New York, in the novel Oryx and Crake by Margaret Atwood
- New New York, In the novel Infinite Jest by David Foster Wallace
- Neo-New York, in the video game, Barkley, Shut Up and Jam: Gaiden
- Neo-New York, in the video game, Guilty Gear Xrd

== Other uses ==
- "New New York", a song on The Cranberries album Stars: The Best of 1992–2002
- "New New York" (Glee), an episode of the American musical television series Glee

== See also ==
- New York (disambiguation)
- New (disambiguation)
- York (disambiguation)
