= Meaning of Life (disambiguation) =

The meaning of life pertains to the significance of living or existence in general.

Meaning of Life or The Meaning of Life may also refer to:

== Film and television ==
- Monty Python's The Meaning of Life, a 1983 film
  - Monty Python's The Meaning of Life (album) (1983)
  - Monty Python's The Meaning of Life (book) (1983)
  - Monty Python's The Meaning of Life (video game) (1997)
- The Meaning of Life (2005 film), an animated short film by Don Hertzfeldt
- The Meaning of Life (TV series), an Irish TV series presented by Gay Byrne

== Literature ==
- The Meaning of Life and Other Essays, a 1990 book by Alfred Ayer
- Meanings of Life, a 1991 book by Roy Baumeister
- The Meaning of Life, a 2007 book by Terry Eagleton
- The Meaning of Life, a 2001 book by Bradley Trevor Greive
- The Meaning of Life: Buddhist Perspectives on Cause and Effect, a book by Tenzin Gyatso, 14th Dalai Lama
- The Meaning of Life: As Shown in the Process of Evolution, a 1928 book by C. E. M. Joad
- Meaning in Life, a three-volume book by Irving Singer
- Man's Search for Meaning, a 1946 book by Viktor Frankl

== Music ==
- Meaning of Life (album), a 2017 album by Kelly Clarkson
- The Meaning of Life, an album by Tankard (1990), or its title track

=== Songs ===
- "Meaning of Life" (Kelly Clarkson song)
- "The Meaning of Life" (The Offspring song) (1997)
- "Meaning of Life", a 2000 song by Disturbed from The Sickness

== See also ==
- The Meaning of Liff, a 1983 humorous dictionary by Douglas Adams and John Lloyd
- M.O.L. (video), a 2002 video album by rock band Disturbed
- Meaning (disambiguation)
- The Secret of Life (disambiguation)
