= 7th Level =

American video game developer

7th Level, Inc.
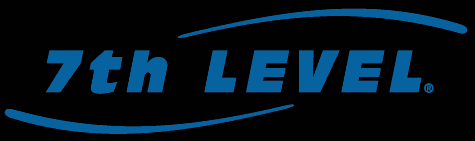
- Type: Video game
- Industry: Video games
- Founded: October 1993
- Defunct: 1998
- Headquarters: Dallas, Texas, U.S.
- Key people: George Grayson; Bob Ezrin; Scott Page
- Number of employees: 180 (1995)

7th Level was a video game development company based in Dallas, Texas and founded in 1993. Notable game titles by the company include: the three Monty Python games (with the aid of Python member Eric Idle); G-Nome (1997), a MechWarrior-style game; Helicops (1997), an anime-inspired game that featured arcade-style aerial combat; and Tracer, a game where the player hacked computer systems distributed for cash by using a virtual avatar in the design of Neuromancer, Shadowrun, or Snowcrash-styled virtual worlds.

== History ==
On February 24, 1995, 7th Level announced that they have acquired Distant Thunder Entertainment, Inc., a Dallas-based game developer specializing in 3-D games. The same year the company acquired Lanpro Corp. and Lanpro Localization Center Inc., based in San Francisco, Calif., who localize interactive entertainment and educational multimedia software.

On March 1, 1996, 7th Level announced that they have acquired PyroTechnix, a privately held company based in Cincinnati, Ohio. The company grew to nearly 300 employees in Texas, California, Ohio, and Europe by June 1996.

On November 17, 1997, 7th Level announced their intention to merge with Pulse Entertainment, in order to create P7 Solutions. The following day, the distribution rights for the three Monty Python games were acquired by Panasonic Interactive Media, which ended 7th Level's involvement with the game's development and publishing. The merger announced between 7th Level and Pulse Entertainment was cancelled in April 1998.

In February 1999, 7th Level merged with Street Technologies Inc. and formed a website named 7th Street.com, which later became learn.com, tutorials.com, and Taleo, which was acquired by Oracle Corporation in 2012. George Grayson, the co-founder of 7th Level, later founded The Imagination Station.

Before ceasing all game development, 7th Level had begun working on another title, named Dominion: Storm Over Gift 3. The partially-completed game was sold to Ion Storm to finish development.

== Titles ==
Game name	Release year	Notes
Tuneland series	1993–1997	Released by a division of 7th Level
Lil' Howie's FunHouse series	1993-1997	Starring the voice of Howie Mandel; Developed by subsidiary Kids' World Entertainment
Monty Python's Complete Waste of Time	1994	
Battle Beast	1995	
Timon & Pumbaa's Jungle Games	1995 (PC), 1996 (Mac OS), 1997 (SNES)	Developed by 7th Level and published by Disney Interactive
Take Your Best Shot	1995	
Ace Ventura	1996	
Arcade America	1996	
The Hunchback of Notre Dame: Topsy Turvy Games	1996	Developed by 7th Level and published by Disney Interactive
Monty Python & the Quest for the Holy Grail	1996	
Tracer	1996	
The Universe According to Virgil Reality	1996	
G-Nome	1997	
Monty Python's The Meaning of Life	1997	
Tamagotchi	1997	PC version, created in association with Bandai Digital Entertainment
Helicops	1997	
My Teacher Is an Alien	1997	
Dominion: Storm Over Gift 3	1998	Development finished by Ion Storm
Return to Krondor	1998	Development finished by PyroTechnix
