= Monty Python & the Quest for the Holy Grail =

1996 video game

- Developer: 7th Level
- Publisher: Panasonic Interactive Media
- Directors: Terry Gilliam; Terry Jones; Steve Martino
- Producer: Charles Otte
- Writer: Bart Jennett
- Platforms: Windows, Macintosh
- Release: June 1996
- Genre: Adventure
- Mode: Single-player

Monty Python & the Quest for the Holy Grail is an adventure game created by 7th Level in 1996 for Windows. The game is based on the 1975 film Monty Python and the Holy Grail and was the second of three Monty Python games created by 7th Level.

The game's aesthetics are a mixture of photo realistic rendering and the comic style of Terry Gilliam. The objective is to move through the world and collect a series of objects in order to cross the bridge of death. The game also contains a series of sketches and audio clips not present in the film, including an alternative reason for the minstrels' disappearance.

== Gameplay ==
Many mini-games are available to play along the way, including a Tetris clone using dead plague victims, a Whac-A-Mole game where a knight has to spank virgins in a bed (points are deducted for spanking the bare-cheeked women) and a Simon says game where the player has to remember the order in which four different coloured burning witches scream. The majority of the game is a point and click interface, where the player must also collect items to complete puzzles, and complete the missing planks on the bridge of death.

== Reception ==
Reception

Review scores
Publication	Score
Next Generation	2/5
PC Zone	6.9/10
MacUser	4/5

Global sales of Holy Grail, Complete Waste of Time and Desktop Pythonizer surpassed 650,000 copies by November 1997, which accounted for revenues above $15 million at 7th Level.

A Next Generation critic said Monty Python & the Quest for the Holy Grail "lacks any semblance of decent gameplay". He elaborated that since there is no indicator of where the hot spots are, the gameplay consists of little more than blindly clicking everywhere on the screen to see what happens. Despite this, he said that enthusiasts of the film would probably still enjoy the game due to the previously unseen video clips included on it.

Pyramid magazine reviewed Monty Python & the Quest for the Holy Grail and stated that "It is proudly proclaimed on the box as the 'Best CD-ROM Game of 932 A.D.,' but Monty Python & the Quest for the Holy Grail is deserving of much more than that bit of false modesty. This is the funniest computer game I've ever played, period."

MacUser named Quest for the Holy Grail one of 1996's top 50 CD-ROMs, while Inside Mac Games declared it the year's best comedy game. The latter publication's editors wrote, "Non-Python fans will probably wonder what the big deal is, but even casual followers will be rolling on the floor." The game was a finalist for Computer Gaming World's 1996 "Classic/Puzzle Game of the Year" award, which ultimately went to Baku Baku Animal. However, it won the category's Reader's Choice award that year.

== Crew ==
- Terry Gilliam – Director
- Terry Jones – Director / voice actor
- Steve Martino – Creative Director
- Alex Yevgenyev – Technical Director
- Charles Otte – Producer
- Robert Alan Ezrin – Executive Producer
- Eric Idle – Executive Producer / Writing Consultant / voice actor
- Trent M. Wyatt – Lead Software Engineer
- Hollis Leech – Supervising Producer
- Jon M. Greenwood – Line Producer
- Bert Jennett – Writer
- Peter Crabb – Writing Consultant
- Ron Wasserman – Music
- Michael Palin – Voice actor
- Kurt Heiden – Sound Designer
