= Timon & Pumbaa's Jungle Games =

1995 video game

- SNES cover art
- Developers: 7th Level (Windows, Macintosh); Tiertex Design Studios (SNES)
- Publishers: Disney Interactive (Windows, Macintosh); THQ (Super NES)
- Series: The Lion King
- Platforms: Windows, Classic Mac OS, Super NES
- Release: Windows: NA: December 15, 1995; Macintosh: NA: 1996; Super NES: NA: November 1997; PAL: March 26, 1998
- Genre: Party
- Modes: Single-player, multiplayer

Timon & Pumbaa's Jungle Games is a 1995 party video game developed by 7th Level and published by Disney Interactive Studios. The game was released on December 15, 1995, for Microsoft Windows. It was one of only two games under the Disney Gamebreak brand, the other being The Hunchback of Notre Dame: Topsy Turvy Games. A Super Nintendo Entertainment System port, developed by Tiertex and published by THQ, was released in North America and PAL territories in November 1997 and March 1998, respectively.

== Gameplay ==
Timon & Pumbaa's Jungle Games features five minigames featuring Timon and Pumbaa and other animal characters from The Lion King. Players access minigames from a hub world. The objective of each minigame is to earn a high score, with no end state. Some games including Bug Drop can be played against another player or computer. Minigames include:

- Bug Drop - a two-player puzzle game in which players must match three or more descending bugs by color. Bug Drop was omitted from the Super Nintendo version of the game. When
- Burper - a shoot 'em up. Players move Pumbaa across the bottom of the screen and fire burps to target falling bugs and other objects, whilst avoiding damage from falling objects such as kitchen sinks. Pumbaa must also use his tail to ward off bugs approaching him on the ground.
- Hippo Hop - a Frogger inspired game, where players as Timon must cross a river without touching the water, using objects such as logs or hippos to run and jump across.
- Jungle Pinball - a pinball game, in which the board is filled with animals instead of bumpers.
- Slingshotter - a second shooting title in which players shoot berries at passing animals by pointing a crosshair.

== Development ==
The game was announced in June 1995. Design of the 'Bug Drop' minigame was a licensed version of the game mechanics of Puyo Puyo. The game was one of the last to be developed for the Super Nintendo Entertainment System in North America and Europe.

== Reception ==
Reception

Review scores
Publication	Score
Computer and Video Games	3/5
PC Entertainment	3.6/5
PC Review	6/10
Quad-City Times	3.5/4

== Sales ==
The game sold 175,000 units.

== See also ==
- List of Disney video games
