= Helicops (video game) =

1997 first person shooter video game

- Developer: Paragon Visual Systems
- Publisher: 7th Level
- Platform: Windows
- Release: March 25, 1997
- Genre: First-person shooter
- Mode: Single-player

Helicops is a 1997 video game developed by Paragon Visual Systems Inc. and published by 7th Level for Windows.

== Storyline ==
After a major earthquake, the city of Tokyo is destroyed. Afterwards, a new city is created, called NeoTokyo. It is a technologically advanced society and the frontier of humanity's science. However, a new threat arises. An international criminal syndicate, known as Nemesys, led by Maxwell Giger, takes over the city with military force. Now, only a specially designed squad of cops piloting high-tech combat helicopters can save NeoTokyo. Each of five combat pilots have their own archenemy among the ranks of Giger's five lieutenants. Upon choosing the one of pilots, the player has to complete four missions against Nemesys leaders. Then, another mission follows, where the player has to take down a leader who is the pilot's personal enemy. One final mission follows, where the player confronts Maxwell Giger himself and thwarts his plan to launch nuclear missiles.

== Gameplay ==
The game is a first-person shooter where the player takes control of a special combat helicopter.The game has five characters to choose from, as well as five different helicopters, each with its own speed and ammo types. The character selection alters only the order in which the missions are given. While controlling the helicopter from the first-person view, the player navigates through levels, which range from city landscapes to gigantic caves. The game consists of six missions, each with about three levels. Using up to four ammo types, the player has to complete a specific task in each level, ranging from saving civilians and destroying an enemy vehicle to locating an artifact and destroying a specific building.

== Reception ==
Reception

Review scores
| Publication | Score |
|---|---|
| Computer Games Strategy Plus | 3.5/5 |
| Computer Gaming World | 3/5 |
| GameSpot | 7.3 |
| Hyper | 72% |
| PC PowerPlay | 79% |

Helicops was released to generally positive reviews, with reviewers highlighting the story, presentation and variety of missions. Computer Games Strategy Plus praised the setting of NeoTokyo and the "distinct solidity to the game world", with "refreshing variety of terrain" that "far exceeds other games of this style". GameSpot complimented the story of Helicops, stating "how personal the game becomes when you begin to absorb the character profiles", due to the rivalries of the central characters, which "(brings) an unlikely emotional element" to the game. March Stepnik of PC PowerPlay highlighted the design of the campaign, praising the missions as "the game's ultimate strength" as "the objectives are intelligent, well thought-out and interesting, and tie in with the overall plot nicely".

More critical reviews of Helicops focused on the lack of depth of the gameplay. Robert Coffey of Computer Gaming World critiqued the game as "not too difficult...and doesn't have much depth", highlighting how "some levels can be finished in under a minute". David Wildgoose of Hyper similarly critiqued the game and questioned "who this game is for", stating that although "half the time it feels like a simple shoot ’em up", the game is "too techy to be (one)" due to difficulties with the controls and navigation.
