= The Lion King 1½ =

2004 film by Bradley Raymond

- Home video release poster
- Directed by: Bradley Raymond
- Screenplay by: Tom Rogers
- Produced by: George A. Mendoza
- Starring: Nathan Lane; Ernie Sabella
- Edited by: Joyce Arrastia
- Music by: Don L. Harper
- Production company: Disneytoon Studios
- Distributed by: Walt Disney Home Entertainment (Note: Released through the Walt Disney Pictures banner.)
- Release date: February 10, 2004
- Running time: 83 minutes
- Country: United States
- Language: English

The Lion King 1 1/2 (known internationally as The Lion King 3: Hakuna Matata) is a 2004 American animated direct-to-video musical comedy film directed by Bradley Raymond and produced by Disneytoon Studios. The third and final installment in the Lion King trilogy, the film focuses on the supporting characters Timon and Pumbaa. A majority of the voice cast from the first film returns to reprise their roles, including Nathan Lane and Ernie Sabella as the voices of Timon and Pumbaa, respectively. The film's structure is inspired by Tom Stoppard's Rosencrantz and Guildenstern Are Dead, a tragicomedy that tells the story of Hamlet from the point of view of two minor characters. The Lion King 1 1/2 was released by Walt Disney Home Entertainment on February 10, 2004 and received generally positive reviews from critics.

== Plot ==
In a home theater (a parody of Mystery Science Theater 3000) Timon and Pumbaa watch the opening act of the first film until Timon fast forwards to the Hakuna Matata scene where they appear. However, Pumbaa rewinds the film to the beginning so as not to confuse the audience. Timon decides to tell the story about how he and Pumbaa met and learned Hakuna Matata, which Pumbaa agrees to. They rewind the film to back before the beginning as their own story begins.

The meerkat Timon lives in his colony on the outskirts of the Pride Lands with his Ma and Uncle Max but is an outcast to the meerkats. One day, while assigned as a lookout for hyenas Shenzi, Banzai, and Ed, his daydreaming of a better life leads to a hyena attack, prompting Timon to leave the colony after deciding that he will never fit in. During his journey, he meets the mandrill Rafiki, who teaches him the philosophy of "Hakuna Matata" and advises him to "look beyond what you see." Timon takes this advice literally, and, after observing Pride Rock in the distance, sets out in that direction. Later on, Timon encounters the warthog Pumbaa.

The pair arrive at Pride Rock during the presentation of Simba to the animals of the Pride Lands, and as they make their way through the crowd, Pumbaa passes gas from his claustrophobia, causing the nearby animals to faint and prompting animals further away to bow to Simba. Attempting to find their perfect home, the pair witness the dramatic ending of "I Just Can't Wait to Be King", the chase through the Elephant Graveyard, the hyena march scene of "Be Prepared", and the wildebeest stampede that kills Mufasa. Escaping the stampede, the pair are sent down a river and over a waterfall. Exhausted, Timon suggests giving up and going home. Pumbaa admits that he does not have a home, and the pair realize they are each other's only friends. They discover that the river has deposited them in a lush green jungle that Pumbaa was trying to tell Timon about. The pair settle there, embracing "Hakuna Matata" as their philosophy.

Timon and Pumbaa later rescue Simba and raise him under their philosophy such as eating grubs and relaxing in a hot tub. Years later, Simba's best friend Nala appears and reunites with him. Believing the trio's friendship to be in jeopardy, Timon and Pumbaa attempt to sabotage their burgeoning romance, and believe they have succeeded when they see the two get into an argument about why Simba refuses to return to Pride Rock much to Timon's excitement. The next day, Nala explains that Simba has returned home to challenge Scar and reclaim his rightful place as king. Pumbaa follows him, but Timon, angry that Simba has seemingly discarded their philosophy, refuses to help. Timon soon becomes lonely without his friends' company. However, Rafiki, having realized his mistake thanks to Ma scolding him for apparently leading Timon on a wild goose chase, indirectly helps him realize that his true Hakuna Matata is with the ones he loves. Timon catches up and reconciles with Pumbaa in the desert.

After helping to distract the hyenas with a hula dance in the Pride Lands, Timon and Pumbaa run into Ma and Uncle Max, who had left the colony in search of Timon. Seeing the hyenas advancing on Simba, Timon proposes that they all help Simba by getting rid of the hyenas for good. Ma and Uncle Max construct a series of tunnels beneath the hyenas while Timon and Pumbaa stall for time. Uncle Max collapses the tunnels, breaking the ground under the hyenas. Timon breaks the final support beam himself and the hyenas are ejected through the tunnels, which Scar then falls into. Simba accepts his place as the rightful king of the Pride Lands, thanking Timon and Pumbaa for their help. Timon invites Ma, Uncle Max, and the rest of the meerkat colony to live in the jungle with him and Pumbaa to complete his Hakuna Matata; the colony praise him as their hero.

As the film ends Pumbaa wants to watch it again, but Timon declines. Ma comes in and wants to watch the film and rewinds the movie. They were soon joined by Uncle Max, Simba, Rafiki, and various Disney characters such as Mickey Mouse, Snow White, Stitch, and many more. Pumbaa gives Timon the remote and plays the movie. Then Pumbaa reminds Timon that he still doesn't do so well in crowds.

== Voice cast ==
- Nathan Lane as Timon, a meerkat who is Pumbaa's best friend. Though somewhat selfish, arrogant, and withdrawn, Timon shows courageous loyalty towards his friends.
- Ernie Sabella as Pumbaa, a warthog who is Timon's best friend. Though slow-witted, he is very empathetic and willing to trust and befriend anyone. He is also claustrophobic and passes gas in crowds.
- Julie Kavner as Ma, a genus meerkat who is Timon's caring but worrisome mother.
- Jerry Stiller as Max, a genus meerkat who is Timon's paranoid, eccentric, but kind-hearted uncle.
- Matt Weinberg as Simba, as a cub who is the son of Mufasa and Sarabi, nephew to Scar and Timon and Pumbaa's good friend.
- Robert Guillaume as Rafiki, a mandrill who is the shaman of the Pride Lands and the one who teaches Timon the philosophy of "Hakuna Matata".
- Moira Kelly as Nala, as a cub who is Simba's best friend.
- Whoopi Goldberg, Cheech Marin, and Jim Cummings as Shenzi, Banzai, and Ed, a trio of spotted hyenas who act as the local predators of Timon's meerkat colony before their allegiance with Scar.
- Edward Hibbert as Zazu, a red-billed hornbill who is the majordomo to Mufasa and later Simba. Hibbert previously voiced Zazu in The Lion King II: Simba's Pride, replacing Rowan Atkinson from the original film.

== Production ==
In April 2000, it was announced that the Walt Disney Company had selected Jeff Ahlholm, Colin Goldman, and Tom Rogers to write the script for The Lion King 3. It was scheduled to arrive in video stores sometime in 2001. Bradley Raymond, who had previously directed Pocahontas II: Journey to a New World (1998) and The Hunchback of Notre Dame II (2002), came on board as director. He recalled that it was then-Disney Feature Animation president Thomas Schumacher's idea to "retell Lion King through the eyes of Timon and Pumbaa". Additionally, Roger Allers and Irene Mecchi, who directed and co-wrote the screenplay for The Lion King respectively, consulted on the production. According to Raymond, it was Allers who came up with the Mystery Science Theater 3000–inspired framing of the film. Furthermore, the filmmakers drew inspiration from Tom Stoppard's play Rosencrantz and Guildenstern are Dead as the first Lion King film had drawn inspiration from Hamlet.

In May 2003, The Lion King 1 1/2 was scheduled for home video release in early spring 2004 with Nathan Lane, Ernie Sabella, and Matthew Broderick reprising their original roles, and Elton John and Tim Rice returning to compose a new song, "That’s All I Need" which was based on "The Warthog Rhapsody" which was deleted from the original film.

The film was animated by Walt Disney Animation Australia in Sydney, New South Wales and Disneytoon Studios in the United States.

== Release ==
Upon its initial home video release, The Lion King 1 1/2 was accompanied by a marketing campaign tie-in with McDonald's with six Happy Meal toys: Simba, Rafiki, Timon, Pumbaa, Mufasa and Ed. (This same promotion was used in international countries for the Special Edition release of the first Lion King with two additional toys featuring Zazu and Scar.)

The DVD edition contains music videos, deleted scenes, behind-the-scenes views of how the movie was made, and two featurettes: Timon -- The Early Years; a mockumentary tracing Timon's childhood through tongue-in-cheek interviews with family and friends; and Disney's Funniest Moments, highlighting Disney animated characters from the Seven Dwarfs to Brother Bear. Three games are also featured, including: Timon and Pumbaa's Virtual Safari 1.5, a Lion King trivia game in the format of Who Wants to Be a Millionaire, titled Who Wants to Be King of the Jungle?, and hosted by Meredith Vieira, then-host of the American syndicated version and a find the face game which shows pictures of several Disney Characters coming to watch Timon and Pumbaa's movie. The Lion King 1 1/2 was released on February 10, 2004. Internationally, it was titled The Lion King 3: Hakuna Matata.

On its first day of sales, the film sold 1.5 million DVD copies, and in its first three days of release the film generated about $55 million in sales revenue, 2.5 of which were DVD copies of the film. By March 2004, six million DVD and VHS copies of the film had been sold in North America. More than 30 percent of the title's sales were from the Latino market. Later that year, the movie was released as part of a 3-movie box set along with The Lion King and The Lion King II: Simba's Pride on December 6. On January 31, 2005, the film, along with its predecessors, went back into moratorium.

The film was first released on Blu-ray as part of an eight-disc box set on October 4, 2011, along with the other two films. The movie later received a separate Blu-ray release as well as a standard DVD release on March 6, 2012, along with The Lion King II: Simba's Pride. The Blu-ray and DVD releases, along with Simba's Pride and the Diamond Edition release of The Lion King, were removed from release on April 30, 2013.

The film was re-released by Walt Disney Studios Home Entertainment on a Blu-ray combo pack and digital release along with The Lion King II: Simba's Pride on August 29, 2017 — the same day as the first film's Signature Edition was released.

== Reception ==
On Rotten Tomatoes, the film has an approval rating of 76% based on 17 reviews, with an average rating of 6.5/10.

Frank Lovece of TV Guide gave the film 3 1/2 stars out of 4 stating that "This retelling of The Lion King (1994) from the point of view of comic sidekicks Timon (voice of Nathan Lane) and Pumbaa (Ernie Sabella) is one of the rare Disney direct-to-video sequels worthy of the original." He went on to say that 'the only aspect of the film that feels forced is the revisionist positioning of Timon as young Simba's step-dad, which has no emotional echo in the first film. The quality of the animation is surprisingly impressive; some static backgrounds are the primary concession to a small-screen budget and the fluid character movements and expressions are vastly superior to those of, say, The Lion King's Timon and Pumbaa TV cartoon series.'" Joe Leydon of Variety gave the film a positive review, writing "toddlers and preschoolers will be equally enchanted and amused by colorful toon shenanigans." Los Angeles Times article writer Susan King wrote that "Because Disney's made-for-video sequels to their classic animated films have been mediocre at best, expectations for this new sequel to the mouse house's 1994 blockbuster were slim. But thanks to a clever story line, snappy dialogue that kids and adults will enjoy, a couple of decent new songs and the return of the original voice actors, Lion King 1 1/2 is an irreverent gas."

Many reviewers have suggested that the film was influenced by the Tom Stoppard play Rosencrantz and Guildenstern Are Dead, which follows Rosencrantz and Guildenstern, two minor characters from Shakespeare's play Hamlet, and details their experiences taking place during the same time as the events of Hamlet, similar to what the film does with its predecessor, which has been similarly compared to Hamlet. Screenwriter Tom Rogers confirmed that this was intentional in a 2019 interview, adding that the film's frame story was inspired by Mystery Science Theater 3000.

== Soundtrack ==
The Lion King 1 1/2: Songs From Timon and Pumbaa's Hilarious Adventure

Soundtrack album by Various Artists
- Released: February 10, 2004
- Recorded: 2003
- Genres: R&B, pop, world, soundtrack
- Length: 22:52
- Label: Walt Disney

The film's soundtrack album contains two original songs: "Diggah Tunnah", written by Seth Friedman and Martin Erskine, and "That's All I Need", written by Elton John and Tim Rice, who had worked on the first film. The latter song, which is performed by Nathan Lane in the film, is largely based on a deleted song from The Lion King titled "The Warthog Rhapsody", with which it shares a similar melody.

The film features the song "Hakuna Matata" from the first film, which is featured both as the original soundtrack recording in the soundtrack album and in the film as a new cover performed by Lane and Ernie Sabella. The soundtrack also consists of various covers of pop songs, such as The Friends of Distinction's "Grazing in the Grass" performed by Raven-Symoné, Kool and the Gang's "Jungle Boogie" performed by Drew K. and the French, and "The Lion Sleeps Tonight" (which appears briefly in the original film as well) by Lebo M. Vinx (and with sampled vocals from Lebo M) performed "Diggah Tunnah Dance". Other featured songs not on the soundtrack include "Sunrise, Sunset" from the musical Fiddler on the Roof and the eponymous theme song from the television show Peter Gunn composed by Henry Mancini.

The film contains an original score composed by Don L. Harper, and also features Ennio Morricone's instrumental theme from the Sergio Leone film The Good, the Bad and the Ugly.

Track listing

| No. | Title | Artist | Length |
|---|---|---|---|
| 1. | "Grazing in the Grass" | Raven-Symoné | 2:59 |
| 2. | "Diggah Tunnah Dance" | Lebo M and Vinx | 3:53 |
| 3. | "That's All I Need" | Nathan Lane | 2:29 |
| 4. | "Hakuna Matata" | Nathan Lane, Ernie Sabella, Jason Weaver and Joseph Williams | 3:33 |
| 5. | "The Lion Sleeps Tonight" | Lebo M | 3:35 |
| 6. | "Jungle Boogie" | Drew K. and the French | 3:20 |
| 8. | "Timon's Traveling Theme" | Don L. Harper | 1:20 |
| 9. | "The Good, the Bad and the Ugly" | Ennio Morricone | 1:43 |
| Total length: | | | 25:35 |

== Awards and nominations ==
| Year | Award | Category | Nominees | Result |
|---|---|---|---|---|
| 2005 | Annie Awards | Best Home Entertainment Production | The Lion King 1½ | Won |
| 2005 | Annie Awards | Music in an Animated Feature Production | The Lion King 1½ | Nominated |
| 2005 | DVD Exclusive Awards | Best Animated Character Performance | Nathan Lane (voice); Alexis Stadermann (animator): For Timon | Won |
| 2005 | DVD Exclusive Awards | Best Animated DVD Premiere Movie | The Lion King 1½ | Won |
| 2005 | DVD Exclusive Awards | Best Director (of a DVD Premiere Movie) | Bradley Raymond | Won |
| 2005 | DVD Exclusive Awards | Best Editing (of a DVD Premiere Movie) | Joyce Arrastia | Won |
| 2005 | DVD Exclusive Awards | Best Screenplay (for a DVD Premiere Movie) | Tom Rogers | Won |
| 2005 | Saturn Award | Best DVD Release | The Lion King 1½ | Nominated |

== Video game ==
A video game based on the film was published in 2003 for the Game Boy Advance, featuring Timon and Pumbaa as the playable characters.
