= Wild About Safety =

Educational series

- Also known as: Timon & Pumbaa's Wild About Safety; Disney's Wild About Safety; Safety Smart
- Written by: Douglas Segal
- Directed by: David Bossert; Matthew O'Callaghan; Frank Montagna
- Starring: Bruce Lanoil; Ernie Sabella
- Theme music composer: Marcy Heisler; Zina Goldrich
- Composer: Mark Watters
- Original language: English
- No. of episodes: 8

Production
- Executive producer: Mark Medernach
- Producers: David Bossert; Daniel Ridgers; Joes A. Rodriquez
- Editors: Charles T. Jones; Vanessa Yulle; Dominck Certo
- Running time: 12 minutes
- Production companies: Disney Educational Productions; Underwriters' Laboratories; Duck Studios

Disney's Wild About Safety is an educational series that features short films that were produced by Disney Educational Productions, Duck Studios, and Underwriters' Laboratories.

The short films are played at Hong Kong Disneyland and Disneyland Paris. Each short film is approximately 12 minutes long. The short films appear as signs at the bag-checking area in the Disneyland Resort. In Walt Disney World and Disneyland's resort hotels, a video about hotel safety, the episode "Safety Smart: On the Go!" Is are played on TV.

== Synopsis ==
Supposedly set in the world of The Lion King, the series follows friends Timon (Bruce Lanoil) and Pumbaa (Ernie Sabella) as they learn to be "Safety Smart" by taking precautions such as being aware of your surroundings. The main storyline for the series is Timon not knowing/following proper safety guidance, and Pumbaa teaching it to him. At the end of each episode, Timon and Pumbaa sing a musical number reviewing all that they learned from the episode in question.

Disney explains: "The two loveable characters will teach students in kindergarten through third grade the importance of always being on the look-out for safety problems. Together with Timon and Pumbaa, students will learn a variety of safety lesson that will help themselves and others avoid injuries".

== Characters ==
- Timon (voiced by Bruce Lanoil)
- Pumbaa (voiced by Ernie Sabella)

Simba and his mother Sarabi make a cameo appearance in Safety Smart: Go Green! in which Timon misunderstands a CFL light bulb as a "cute fluffy lion."

== List of shorts ==
- Safety Smart: At Home! (27 January 2008) - Pumbaa teaches Timon how to be safe in a house when they move into their new home in the jungle.
- Safety Smart: Goes Green! (23 February 2009) - Pumbaa teaches Timon what they can do to make the earth a safe, healthier place from picking up trash and recycling it and conserving the resources.
- Safety Smart: In the Water! (27 April 2009) - Timon and Pumbaa discuss water safety.
- Safety Smart: About Fire! (2009) - Timon and Pumbaa discuss fire safety.
- Safety Smart: Healthy and Fit! (2010) - When Timon is sick, Pumbaa teaches him about various ways to prevent germs from spreading, like exercise, nutrition, and sleep.
- Safety Smart: Online! (2012) - Pumbaa teaches Timon about online safety, such as not giving personal information to strangers online, knowing who the person on the other end might actually be, how to handle cyberbullying situations, and getting a parent's permission before visiting new websites.
- Safety Smart: Honest and Real! (2013) - Timon is upset because he didn't win the Honest & Real Award until Pumbaa teaches him how to have good character by identifying and practicing the three character traits (honesty, kindness, and responsibility) as they prepare for Hilda Hippo's party to honor her for winning.
- Safety Smart: On the Go! (2013) - Pumbaa teaches Timon the safety rules when walking, biking, riding in a car, a plane, a boat, a bus, and a train on their way to Pride Rock.

== Awards and nominations ==
Year	Nominee / work	Award	Result
2009	Safety Smart: At Home!	Teachers’ Choice Award	Won
2009	Safety Smart: Goes Green!	Parents’ Choice Product Recommendation	Won
2009	Safety Smart: Goes Green!	Environmental Media Award	Won
2009	Safety Smart: In the Water!	Parents’ Choice Recommended Product	Won
2010	Safety Smart: About Fire!	Parents’ Choice Recommended Product	Won
2010	Safety Smart: About Fire!	AEP Distinguished Achievement Award	Won
2012	Safety Smart: Healthy & Fit!	Parents’ Choice Silver Award	Won
2013	Safety Smart: Healthy & Fit!	Learning Magazine Teachers’ Choice Award	Won
2013	Safety Smart: Online!	Parents’ Choice Gold Award,	Won
2013	Safety Smart: Honest & Real!	Parents’ Choice Silver Award	Won
2013	Safety Smart: On the Go!	Parents’ Choice Silver Award	Won
