= Timon and Pumbaa's Virtual Safari =

Series of interactive DVD games

Timon and Pumbaa's Virtual Safari is a series of interactive 3D virtual games that were included as bonus-features within several of Disney's The Lion King-related DVD releases throughout the 2000s, starting in 2003. The series of games centers on Timon and Pumbaa going on a variety of safari adventures. The Virtual Safari games are a cross between the Jungle Cruise and Indiana Jones-related Disney theme park rides along with Kilimanjaro Safaris. Players press the left or right arrow buttons on their DVD player's remote at decision making points to decide which way the vehicle travels.

== Overview ==
Buena Vista Home Entertainment, Disney Feature Animation, and DisneyToon Studios produced four Virtual Safari games, including:

- Timon And Pumbaa’s Virtual Safari Boat Tour, Included within Disney's 2003 DVD release of The Lion King
- Timon And Pumbaa’s Virtual Safari Jeep Tour, Included within Disney's 2003 DVD release of The Lion King
- Timon And Pumbaa’s Virtual Safari 1.5: The Lion King Prideland Adventure, Included within Disney's 2004 DVD release of The Lion King 1½
- Timon And Pumbaa’s Virtual Safari 2.0: Prideland Pachiderm Safari, Included within Disney's 2004 DVD release of The Lion King II: Simba's Pride

== Production ==
This series marked the first time that Buena Vista Home Entertainment collaborated with Disney Feature Animation and DisneyToon Studios to create a game of this type. Andy Siditsky, Disney's Senior VP of Worldwide DVD production and Creative Services, explained that he wanted set a higher benchmark with what could be done within a DVD set top experience: "We started thinking about various theme park rides land Timon and Pumbaa were our natural hosts. That led to different ways of doing it and different pieces and wondering where would you go?"

Siditsky brainstormed ideas with a small team including re-recording mixer Terry Porter, discussing different types of tours. They worked closely with the Feature Animation team to develop the animation and assets for the game. As part of the research, the team traveled to Walt Disney World, hung around The Jungle Cruise and read some of scripts of the rides, using them as a guide. There was some trepidation over whether the team could successfully complete the project as it had never been done before. Describing it as an "experiment", Siditsky noted that it opened up the door to create virtual safari type of experiences down the line. Part of the challenge was in making it an engaging theme park ride while being relevant to The Lion King franchise and including some adult humour. An additional challenge was in making the animation quality up to the level of the film, considering time and budget constraints. Around 20% of The Lion King was repurposed for Virtual Safari. The first Virtual Safari game was released on The Lion King special edition after six months of work, which combined traditional and CG elements.

I spent a number of hours at John Ross shop at Gork Enterprises and it was a very collaborative process. We supplied them with digital images that were projection mapped onto billboards. They put together the CG elements and digital artwork and built the environments. I helped them match the look of the film, such as when repurposed monkeys jump up and down on the bow of the jungle cruiser.

— Dave Bossert, producer/artistic coordinator on Virtual Safari, who served as an FX animator on The Lion King back in 95

Ernie Sabella reprised the voice of Pumbaa and Kevin Schon voiced Timon in both 1.0 and 2.0. Nathan Lane returned to voice Timon for the 1.5 installment. 1.5 also featured the returning voices of Julie Kavner and Jerry Stiller as Ma and Uncle Max respectively.

== Critical reception ==
The Digital Bits felt the game would be appealing to young children, but noted that as someone who buys DVD out of a love of film, "interactive games don't particularly do anything for me". Sound and Vision felt it was one of the few aspects of the DVD specifically aimed at children. DVDCC said it was "Worth checking out". When speaking about how a featurette about the lost attraction The Little Mermaid Under the Sea Adventure was to be featured on The Little Mermaid 2-Disc DVD, DLP Today commented "they’ve taken the “Virtual Safari” idea from The Lion King’s DVDs and transferred the concept to a real Disney theme park attraction".

DVD Mag said they "didn't expect a lot from Virtual Safari 1.5 but had it offered a very fun experience." IGN felt it was "definitely not as traumatic as the original virtual safari on The Lion King". MousePlanet noted there is "plenty of humor and adventure mixed in" to Virtual Safari 2.0. AnimatedViews felt the game was impressing but lacked replay value due to not having much gameplay.
