= Timon and Pumbaa =

Characters from The Lion King franchise

- The Lion King characters
- Timon (left) and Pumbaa (right)
- First appearance: The Lion King (1994)
- Created by: Irene Mecchi; Jonathan Roberts; Linda Woolverton
- Portrayed by: Timon: Max Casella (musical); Pumbaa: Tom Alan Robbins (musical)
- Voiced by: Timon: Nathan Lane (1994–2004, 2023) (Note: Traditionally-animated film trilogy, Disney's Animated Storybook: The Lion King, Circle of Life: An Environmental Fable, early episodes of Timon & Pumbaa, The Lion King: Simba's Mighty Adventure, and Once Upon a Studio); Quinton Flynn (1995) (Note: Most season one episodes of Timon & Pumbaa and Disney's Activity Center: The Lion King); Kevin Schon (1995–2019, 2024) (Note: Intro and all episodes of seasons two and three of Timon & Pumbaa, The Lion King: Simba's Mighty Adventure, House of Mouse, Timon and Pumbaa's Virtual Safari, The Lion Guard, and Disney Dreamlight Valley); Jim Cummings (1996) (Note: Manly form in the Timon & Pumbaa episode "Isle of Manhood"); Bruce Lanoil (2004–2017) (Note: Kingdom Hearts II, Wild About Safety shorts, and Disney Think Fast); Billy Eichner (2019, 2024; photorealistic CGI version) (Note: The Lion King (2019) and Mufasa: The Lion King); Pumbaa: Ernie Sabella (1994–present) (Note: All appearances except where noted); Jim Cummings (1995) (Note: Older Pumbaa in the Timon & Pumbaa episode "Amazon Quiver"); Leslie Mack (2003) (Note: Disney's Extreme Skate Adventure); Seth Rogen (2019, 2022, 2024; photorealistic CGI version) (Note: The Lion King (2019), Chip 'n Dale: Rescue Rangers, and Mufasa: The Lion King)
- Inspired by: Rosencrantz and Guildenstern

In-universe information
- Full name: Timon Berkowitz and Pumbaa Smith
- Species: Timon: Meerkat (Suricata suricatta); Pumbaa: Common warthog (Phacochoerus africanus)
- Gender: Male (both)
- Family: Simba and Bunga (adoptive sons and best friends); Nala (adoptive daughter-in-law); Kopa (adoptive grandson; in the books); Pumbaa Jr. (adoptive son); Kiara (adoptive granddaughter); Kion (adoptive grandson); Kovu (adoptive grandson-in-law); Rani (adoptive granddaughter-in-law); Ma (mother; Timon); Max (uncle; Timon); Boaris (uncle; Pumbaa); Ernie (uncle; Pumbaa)

Timon and Pumbaa are an animated meerkat and warthog duo who appear in Disney's The Lion King franchise, introduced in the 1994 animated feature film. Timon was played through his many appearances by Nathan Lane (in all three films and early episodes of the show), Max Casella (the original actor in Broadway musical), Kevin Schon (in most episodes of the show), Quinton Flynn (in certain episodes of the show), Bruce Lanoil in the Wild About Safety shorts and Kingdom Hearts II, while Pumbaa is voiced by Ernie Sabella (in all of his traditionally animated speaking appearances), and was portrayed by Tom Alan Robbins in the original cast of the Broadway musical. In the CGI remake, the characters are portrayed by Billy Eichner and Seth Rogen, respectively. Nathan Lane and Ernie Sabella first came to audition for the roles of the hyenas, but when the producers saw how well they worked together, they decided to cast them as Timon and Pumbaa.

As with many characters in The Lion King, Pumbaa's name derives from the East African language Swahili. In Swahili, pumbaa (v.) means "to be foolish, silly, weakminded, careless, negligent." Timon is one of the few characters whose name has no meaning in Swahili; Timon is a historical Greek name, taken to mean "he who respects." Timon's name may derive from Shakespeare's tragedy Timon of Athens, another Shakespeare reference in a film which derives its plot from Hamlet. The tragedy is based in the history of the real Timon of Athens, a famous misanthrope during the era of the Peloponnesian War, who refused life in Athens to live isolated. Another explanation is that he is named after the Greek philosopher Timon, a disciple of Pyrrho, the founder of the school of skepticism.

Timon is an insouciant and fast-talking meerkat who is known for claiming Pumbaa's ideas as his own. Pumbaa is a friendly warthog with flatulence problems but is also a brave warrior, charging into battle like a battering ram, and taking great offense if anyone who's not his friend calls him a pig, at which point he exclaims "They call me Mister pig!"—a reference to Sidney Poitier's line "They call me Mister Tibbs!" from the 1967 film In the Heat of the Night and then screams as he charges. Unlike real meerkats, Timon can walk on his hind legs, while in real life, meerkats walk on all four legs and can only stand on their hind ones.

== Development ==
=== Conception ===
During production of The Lion King, Timon and Pumbaa were portrayed as children who grew up with Simba in the Pride Lands and fled with him to the jungle. Timon and Pumbaa's roles were later changed to make them "strangers and fellow outcasts" so that Simba would have someone to take him under their wing.

Timon and Pumbaa originally sang a song titled "Warthog Rhapsody", but it was ultimately replaced by "Hakuna Matata" as the filmmakers wanted to move the plot along and have Simba being shown turning his back on responsibilities. The "Hakuna Matata" musical sequence originally had a verse explaining Timon's backstory. In this version, Timon was an oddball amongst other meerkats from his former colony as he refused to work, which ultimately led to his exile. That scene was deleted as the filmmakers felt that it was not working, thus changing the scene to focus on Pumbaa's background instead.

According to George Scribner, Pumbaa was originally conceived as an elephant by Lion King screenwriter Linda Woolverton, but Scribner recommended that he be a warthog instead.

=== Voice ===
Originally, Nathan Lane auditioned for the role of Zazu, and he and his friend and fellow voice actor Ernie Sabella were originally cast for the hyenas. Upon meeting at the recording studio, Lane and Sabella – who were starring together in the 1992 Broadway revival of Guys and Dolls at the time – were asked to record together as hyenas. The directors laughed at their performance and because of their strong and authentic chemistry, they were instead cast as Timon and Pumbaa.

=== Design and characterization ===
Tony Bancroft and Michael Surrey were given the assignment to animate Timon and Pumbaa, having previously animated Aladdin and Iago from Aladdin (1992) and Cogsworth and Lumière from Beauty and the Beast (1991). Surrey commented that since a warthog would eat a meerkat in real life, they have taken quite a few liberties in making them friends. As he watched Nathan Lane at the recording session, he was able to embody his distinct eyebrows and facial expressions into the character of Timon. Bancroft added that he would typically start the animation in most scenes because Pumbaa is "almost like a moving stage for Timon", noting that Timon is usually on Pumbaa's head or his nose or climbing all over him. Before he did any actual drawing, he talked the scene over to Surrey to make sure that what he was doing would work with what Surrey had in mind for Timon.

=== Music ===
Timon and Pumbaa sing the musical number "Hakuna Matata" (written by Elton John with lyrics by Tim Rice) as they teach Simba about moving forward from their troubled pasts and forgetting their worries. It was rumored that Rice got the idea for the lyrics for the song from watching the comedy series Bottom and at one point wanted the show's stars Rik Mayall and Adrian Edmondson to play Timon and Pumbaa. However, Rice has stated that he meant to craft the number as a philosophical conversation.

Timon and Pumbaa also sing the beginning and end parts of the musical number "Can You Feel the Love Tonight", written by Elton John and Tim Rice. It was planned that the song was to be sung only by Timon and Pumbaa, but when the story reel was screened for John, he disliked the comical nature of the concept as he declared that the song was meant to follow "Disney's tradition of great love songs", and that it could "express the lions' feelings for each other far better than dialogue could". As a result, Rice wrote another draft of the song in which Timon and Pumbaa opened, while Simba, Nala, and the choir sang in the middle. This version of the song ended up being the finalized version, although John remained partial to the original lyrics.

== Appearances ==
=== The Lion King ===
Timon and Pumbaa are played by Nathan Lane and Ernie Sabella. Timon was animated and created by Michael Surrey. They made their first appearances in the 1994 film when they chased away the vultures that swarmed around young Simba, who had collapsed from heat exhaustion. Timon and Pumbaa then took the comatose lion cub back to a small pool, where they splashed water on him to wake him up. After Simba is awakened by the two, they introduce themselves and welcome Simba to stay with them and follow their hakuna matata philosophy. At first, Simba is unsure about Timon and Pumbaa's lifestyle, but it is explained to him in the song "Hakuna Matata".

Many years later, while out on a musical walk with Timon, Pumbaa is distracted by a bug, which he follows into the jungle. The bug leads him right to a hungry lioness prowling around, who then tries to hunt down Pumbaa. She chases the warthog until Simba springs into action, and the two lions engage in conflict. When the lioness pins Simba, he recognizes her as Nala, his childhood playmate. They are happy to be together again, but Timon is jealous after they leave for a night of romance. He and Pumbaa start singing the song "Can You Feel the Love Tonight?" and are joined by Simba and Nala on their night out. Still, the two help Simba fight Scar and gain his rightful place as the king of the Pride Lands, most notably when they create a hula distraction to lure away Scar's hyenas. Pumbaa single-handedly defeats Shenzi, Banzai and Ed. They also stand on top of Pride Rock along with Simba and Nala when Rafiki presents Simba and Nala's newborn cub to the animals of the Pride Lands.

=== The Lion King's Timon & Pumbaa ===
Timon and Pumbaa starred in their own spin-off television series. The duo continues to live by their problem-free philosophy Hakuna Matata, having many adventures in their jungle home, as well as across the globe, such as the United States, Spain, and France. In this series, Timon and Pumbaa are given full names: Timon's is revealed to be "Timon Leslie Berkowitz" and Pumbaa's is revealed to be "Pumbaa Smith".

Being bug eaters, Timon and Pumbaa are often shown hunting for grubs of various species. There are, however, certain grubs that Timon and Pumbaa are willing to relent eating and decide to befriend, mostly those that have sentience and even the ability to speak, such as Speedy the snail. There are also certain species of bugs that they would not eat due to their notorious natures, such as stinkbugs. Timon and Pumbaa are also occasionally seen spreading their Hakuna Matata lifestyle to others, although they learn that such lifestyle does not work for everyone, such as humans and bees, as shown in the episodes "Swiss Missed" and "To Be Bee or Not to Be Bee" respectively. The series also highlights and expands on Timon and Pumbaa's friendship, showing their liking and occasional conflict with each other and them celebrating their own holiday called "Bestest Best Friend Day", which was established by Pumbaa to show how much he values their friendship.

It is revealed in the series that before Timon met Pumbaa, he had a best friend named Fred, who is a meerkat who loves to laugh and play around as well as pulling practical jokes. The episode "Isle of Manhood" also reveals Timon taking a manhood test in order to become a full-fledged meerkat. Timon also is very egotistical and tends to get involved in "get-rich-quick" schemes throughout the series.

As usual, Pumbaa proves to be the brains of the duo, but Timon thinks that he is. It is shown in the series that Pumbaa is very popular among the jungle and usually gains the chance to live the glamorous life, but gives it up for Timon. Pumbaa's notorious odor also annoys Timon on some occasions, as shown in the episode "Scent of the South" where he berates Pumbaa for smelling bad, leading Pumbaa to seek help from a skunk expert to remove his odor. In the episode "Russia Hour", Pumbaa is shown to have an uncle named Boaris, who is very famous in Russia due to his ballet dancing skills. Pumbaa is also shown to have a deceased uncle named Ernie in "Sense & Senegambia". In another episode "New Guinea Pig", it is shown that Pumbaa's tusks can get in his way of doing some activities or passing through some things. As a result, Pumbaa starts to get tired of them and considers trading them to the three natives. The warthog later realizes how useful his tusks are and learns from Timon that they are an important part of what makes him who he is. It is also revealed that years before the episode "Madagascar About You", an arranged marriage has been set up for Pumbaa before he was even born.

The episode "Once Upon a Timon" reveals (one of the two versions of) Timon's origin and how he first met Pumbaa, where it is shown that Timon was a member of a colony of meerkats who each had a specific duty. The episode "Home is Where the Hog is" reveals that Pumbaa was a member of a sounder of warthogs who banished him due to his foul smell, and as a result, Pumbaa spent his life as a loner until he met and befriended Timon.

=== The Lion King II: Simba's Pride ===
It is unclear whether Timon and Pumbaa have taken up residence at Pride Rock, or just make frequent visits. They serve as aides to Simba and are often called upon to protect his adventurous daughter Kiara, replacing Zazu's role as babysitters. Despite being bumbling, Simba trusts them to look after Kiara and does not blame them when Kiara escapes as Kiara is known to do so.

A few years later when a now adolescent Kiara goes on her first hunt, they are hired to make sure she won't get hurt. Furious that Simba broke his promise to let her hunt alone, Kiara leaves the Pride Lands to hunt outside the boundary. Timon and Pumbaa also teach Kovu how to have fun after he forgets due to years of indoctrination in hatred. After Kovu's pride, the Outsiders, ambush Simba, and Nuka’s death, Timon is on Kiara and Zazu’s side instantly, not even wanting to hear Kovu's explanation. Afterwards, they carry Simba back and discover that Kiara has left Pride Rock (having left to find Kovu) and reveal this to Simba, much to the latter's annoyance as he had forbidden Kiara to leave Pride Rock in order to stop her from seeing Kovu again. Timon and Pumbaa later assist Simba and his pride in the battle against Kovu's vengeful and bitter mother Zira, and the Outsiders, but get chased off and trapped by a group of Outsider lionesses, until Timon threatens to use Pumbaa's tail as a gun and use his gas on them causing them to flee in fear. When Simba tries to make peace with Zira after Kiara convinces him that both prides "were one", he uses the same advice Timon and Pumbaa gave him when he was a cub, showing how much he had learned from his old friends.

Timon and Pumbaa then return to Pride Rock with the pride and witness Kiara marry Kovu.

=== The Lion King 1½ ===
Timon and Pumbaa are the main characters in this follow-up, which reveals an alternative version of Timon's origin and how he first met Pumbaa. The duo are also revealed to have passed by and caused some key events in the first film before their first appearance. Timon, his mother Ma and his uncle Max were part of a meerkat colony living in the savannah, but he was unable to do any job to a good standard and almost led to the meerkats being at the mercy of Shenzi, Banzai and Ed. Miserable, he received counsel from Rafiki, who taught him the "Hakuna Matata" philosophy and told him to "look beyond what you see." Timon took this literally and set off to find the ultimate paradise. Along the way, he first encountered Pumbaa and the duo instantly became friends. On the way to find paradise, they passed by the presentation of Simba; the "I Just Can't Wait To Be King" sequence; the elephant graveyard; the hyenas marching to the "Be Prepared" sequence; and the wildebeest stampede. Finally, they reach a beautiful oasis and are enjoying life until they find an unconscious Simba. After rescuing Simba, Timon and Pumbaa find themselves as surrogate parents trying to keep up with the head-strong cub.

The film also shows more of Simba's life with Timon and Pumbaa before Nala came along, stating that Simba had beaten Timon in every bug-eating contest they had done with one another. Timon and Pumbaa, afraid that Nala would take away their friend, attempted to spoil Simba and Nala's date by letting out bees, a spider, and tripping the two, but all failed. Later on, they see Simba and Nala arguing. They also mistake the appearance of Mufasa's ghost as bad weather. After they realize Simba has gone back to take his rightful place as king, it is revealed that Pumbaa had set off to help Simba before Timon, who was unsupportive and angry. Timon eventually came to his senses thanks to Rafiki's continued advice and quickly followed, leaving Rafiki satisfied with his progress. After the duo provide their hula distraction, they encounter Ma and Uncle Max, who had been searching for Timon ever since he left the meerkat colony. Later on during the fight, they defeat the hyenas by digging a massive tunnel network, sending the hyenas down to Pride Rock's base in time for them to take revenge on Scar for betraying them. At the end, Timon takes his entire meerkat colony to live in the oasis, free from danger.

=== The Lion Guard ===
Timon and Pumbaa appear with several of the film's other characters in the Disney Junior series The Lion Guard, which centers around Simba and Nala's second-born cub, Kion. During the series, which is set within the time gap in The Lion King II: Simba's Pride, Timon and Pumbaa are adoptive uncles of a young honey badger named Bunga, who is one of the members of the Lion Guard. When Bunga was an infant, he encountered Timon and Pumbaa singing "Utamu". Instantly smitten, Bunga had begun following them around. Pumbaa wanted to keep Bunga, but Timon didn't want to raise anymore kids since he and Pumbaa have already done so with Simba, but the two friends see that the honey badger wants to be with them as well. Before he accepted Bunga, Timon instructed the honey badger to climb a tree and fetch them some Utamu grubs. When Bunga had succeeded and given the grubs to Timon, the meerkat had allowed him to stay, and the three have lived together ever since.

=== The Lion King (2019) ===
Billy Eichner and Seth Rogen played Timon and Pumbaa respectively in the 2019 CGI remake. Director Jon Favreau encouraged Rogen and Eichner, who did their voice recordings together, to improvise a lot.

Eichner said that "It's such a great role that allows you to do so much. But I've learned that the bigger the project and the bigger the names that you're working with, the more you have to ignore it. If you get to the soundstage and you're thinking, 'Oh my God, what a full-circle moment! Nathan Lane did it originally! Beyoncé's in this!' then you're paralyzed creatively. You just have to put that out of your head in order to get the job done." Eichner also talked about having "what some may consider a gay sensibility" that he brought to the table when he voiced Timon.

Rogen said that "As an actor, I 100 percent don't think I'm right for every role—there are a lot of roles I don't think I'm right for even in movies I'm making—but Pumbaa was one I knew I could do well. Truthfully, I probably would have been a little insulted if [Favreau] didn't ask me to."

Among the film's vocal performances, Eichner and Rogen received particular praise by critics, with A.V. Club's A.A. Dowd proclaiming: "Ultimately, only Billy Eichner and Seth Rogen, as slacker sidekicks Timon and Pumbaa, make much of an impression; their funny, possibly ad-libbed banter feels both fresh and true to the spirit of the characters—the perfect remake recipe."

=== Mufasa: The Lion King (2024) ===
Rogen and Eichner returned to voice the characters in the 2024 prequel film Mufasa: The Lion King. Director Barry Jenkins encouraged them to improvise in the roles, therefore the majority of the two characters' dialogue was improvised. Rogen said that while voicing the characters they were "beholden to nothing" and were given complete freedom to be imaginative. They were surprised to discover that some of the improvised dialogue was used in the final film.

== Other appearances ==
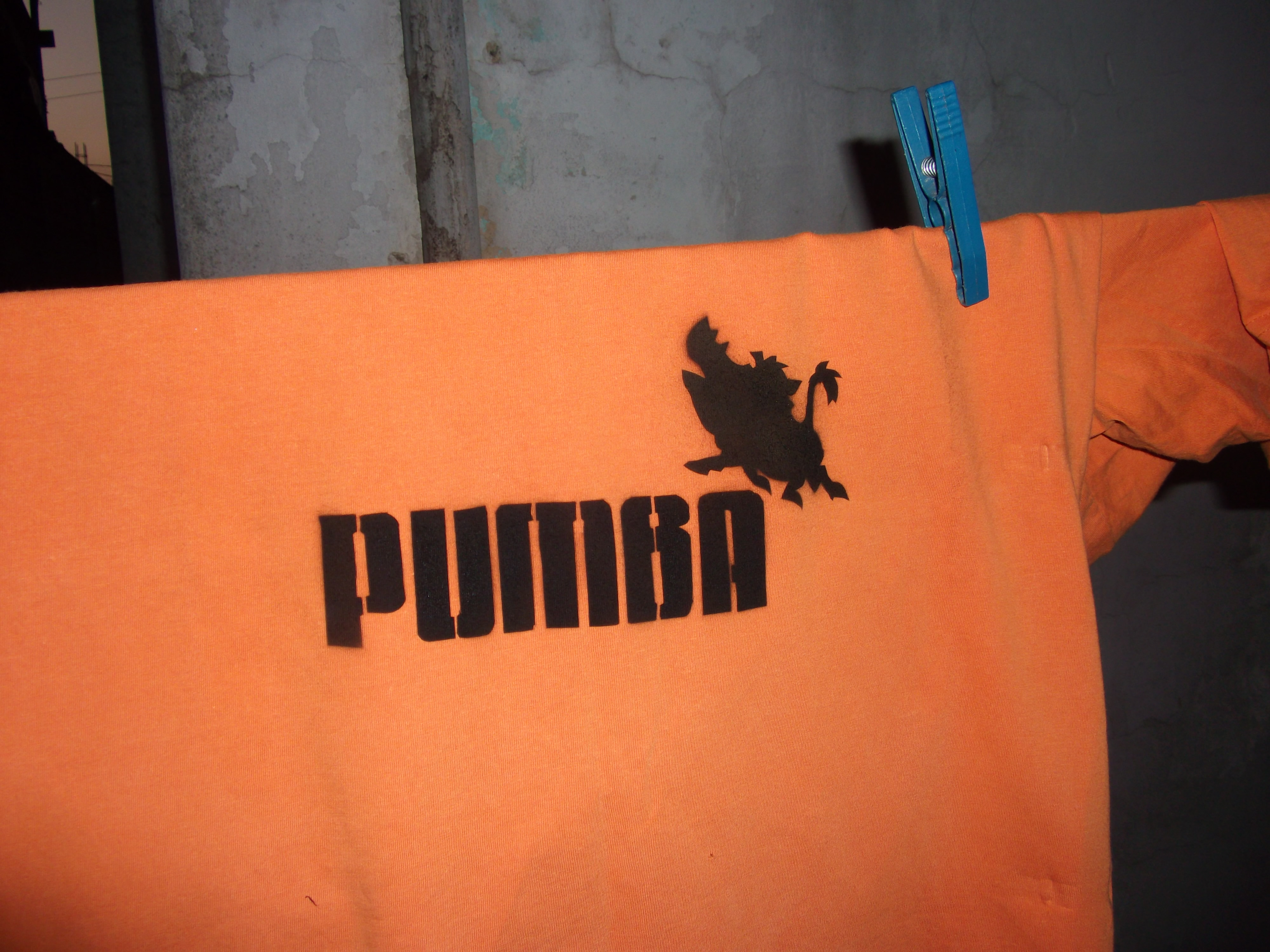
An example of Lion King fan artwork - the stencil, which features Pumbaa, is a parody of the Puma logo.

Timon and Pumbaa made regular appearances in the animated television series House of Mouse (2001–2002) as guests and also appeared in Mickey's Magical Christmas: Snowed in at the House of Mouse. An occasional running gag in the show involved Timon trying to eat Jiminy Cricket, only to be stopped by Pumbaa.

The two have made cameos in other Disney films and TV series. In Aladdin and the King of Thieves, the Genie turns into Pumbaa in a scene saying, "Hakuna Matata". Timon appears in the Virtual Magic Carpet Ride game included on disc 2 of the 2004 Aladdin Platinum Edition DVD. In Enchanted, Pip accidentally transforms himself momentarily into Pumbaa in the DVD extra "Pip's Predicament: A Pop-Up Adventure". Pumbaa makes a cameo appearance in the "Good Neighbor Cruella" episode of 101 Dalmatians: The Series. Both characters make a cameo appearance in the Lilo & Stitch: The Series finale film, Leroy & Stitch, hidden among Stitch's experiment "cousins" in the climax. In The Jungle Book 2, two animals resembling Timon and Pumbaa can briefly be seen dancing during the song "W-I-L-D" until Baloo knocks them off the wall with his backside. Rogen reprises the 2019 film version of Pumbaa in the 2022 film Chip 'n Dale: Rescue Rangers, who appears in a scene with several other characters also voiced by Rogen.

The duo also appeared within the Timon and Pumbaa’s Virtual Safari series of interactive virtual games. Produced by Buena Vista Home Entertainment, Disney Feature Animation, and DisneyToon Studios, these DVD bonus-feature games were included within Disney's The Lion King-related DVD releases throughout the 2000s. Ernie Sabella reprised the voice of Pumbaa and Kevin Schon voiced Timon for the first game. Nathan Lane returned to voice Timon for the latter Virtual Safari installments.

Timon and Pumbaa were featured in a series of commercials that were part of the Smart Yet Satisfying PSA Campaign. These commercials were co-developed by Disney, Team Nutrition, and the United States Department of Agriculture. They are all animated in the style of the 1995 TV show (and by extension, the style of a typical Disney Afternoon cartoon).

Timon and Pumbaa, along with a young Simba, appeared on the packaging of the Kellogg's cereal "Chocolate Mud & Bugs", which was themed around them.

The two were referenced in The Black Eyed Peas and J Balvin song "Ritmo".

=== Video games ===
Disney Interactive Studios published two games starring Timon and Pumbaa. The first game is titled Timon & Pumbaa's Jungle Games, which was released in 1995 for Microsoft Windows under the "Disney Gamebreak" brand and was developed by 7th Level. It consists of five mini-games, including Jungle Pinball (a pinball game where the board is filled with animals instead of bumpers), Burper (a shooter type game, using Pumbaa to belch gas), Hippo Hop (concept similar to Frogger), Bug Drop (based on Puyo Puyo), and Slingshooter (a slingshot game) accessible directly from the menu. The second game published was an educational game titled Disney's Adventures in Typing With Timon and Pumbaa, which was released in 1998 for PCs with Microsoft Windows and Mac OS. It teaches children how to type through use of five games.

Timon and Pumbaa reprise their roles from The Lion King in the 2006 video game Kingdom Hearts II. They charge in to battle the hyenas, and are saved by Sora, Donald Duck, and Goofy. After Simba's coronation, they fear that Simba will forget them and let the other lions eat them, though Sora assures them that Simba will never forget them. Pumbaa later shows his bravery by standing between a pregnant Nala and Scar's "ghost". Ernie Sabella reprises his role as Pumbaa, while Timon is voiced by Bruce Lanoil.

Timon and Pumbaa are playable characters to unlock for a limited time in Disney Magic Kingdoms.

=== Walt Disney Parks and Resorts ===
Timon appears at Walt Disney Parks and Resorts as a meetable character in Adventureland and at Disney’s Animal Kingdom, while Pumbaa occasionally appears on show or parade floats. At Walt Disney World, the two appear in signage explaining the park's safety policies to visitors. They were similarly featured on the Disney Safety website which was created in conjunction with Animax Entertainment until its closure. Timon and Pumbaa were main characters in The Legend of the Lion King, a defunct Fantasyland attraction in Walt Disney World's Magic Kingdom, which retold the story of the film using fully articulated puppets. The two also make cameo appearances in the Hong Kong Disneyland and the Disneyland versions of It's a Small World. They appeared along with Simba in the film Circle of Life: An Environmental Fable, an edutainment film at Epcot's Land Pavilion that ran from 1995 to 2018. Timon and Pumbaa both feature in Festival of the Lion King at Animal Kingdom, voiced by Kevin Schon and Ernie Sabella.

=== Educational shorts ===
Timon and Pumbaa were featured in a series of educational shorts called Find Out Why, sponsored by the National Science Foundation. These shorts involved Timon and Pumbaa answering kids' questions about science, such as why there is lightning, why we sneeze, why pandas don't live in deserts, why there is wind, and why an airplane flies. The shorts were interstitial segments of the Saturday morning cartoon block Disney's One Saturday Morning in 2000. The series consisted of nine shorts, five of which were featured in the extras at Disc 2 of the 1998 film's Special Edition DVD in 2004.

Disney Educational Productions and Underwriters Laboratories co-produced an educational film series called Wild About Safety: Safety Smart with Timon and Pumbaa, where Pumbaa educated Timon on how to stay safe. Ernie Sabella reprised his role as Pumbaa, while Timon was voiced by Bruce Lanoil. The series ran from 2008 to 2013. Each installment is approximately 12 minutes long. They are all somewhat animated in the style of the 1994 film, with occasional use of stock footage from the movie, as well as Tony Bancroft, who animated Pumbaa in the film, returning as an animator for the series. The following titles were produced:

- Wild About Safety: Safety Smart At Home! (2008)
- Wild About Safety: Safety Smart Goes Green! (2009)
- Wild About Safety: Safety Smart In The Water! (2009)
- Wild About Safety: Safety Smart About Fire! (2009)
- Wild About Safety: Safety Smart Healthy and Fit! (2010)
- Wild About Safety: Safety Smart Online! (2012)
- Wild About Safety: Safety Smart Honest & Real! (2013)
- Wild About Safety: Safety Smart On The Go! (2013)
