= Anthony DeRosa =

American animator (born 1959)

Anthony "Tony" DeRosa (born January 1, 1959) is an American animator, best known for his work at Walt Disney Animation Studios. DeRosa has worked as a supervising animator on several Disney Animated Feature Films, including The Lion King, Pocahontas, Hercules, Fantasia 2000, Atlantis: The Lost Empire and The Princess and the Frog. Outside of Disney, DeRosa has worked as an animator on films such as Looney Tunes: Back in Action, Fat Albert, Curious George and The Simpsons Movie, for which he received an Annie Award nomination.

== Filmography ==
Year	Title	Credits	Characters	Notes
1985	Hoomania (Video short)	Character Designer / Storyboard Artist		End Credited and known as Tony A. Derosa
1985	The Black Cauldron	Breakdown Artist		
1986	The Great Mouse Detective	Key Assistant Animator		
1988	Oliver & Company	Character Animator		End Credited and known as Anthony Derosa
1989	The Little Mermaid	Character Animator		
1990	The Rescuers Down Under	Supervising Animator		End Credited and known as Anthony de Rosa
1991	Beauty and the Beast	Animator	Beast	
1992	Aladdin	Animator	Aladdin	
1994	The Lion King	Supervising Animator	Adult Nala	End Credited and known as Anthony Derosa
1995	Pocahontas	Supervising Animator	Nakoma	
1996	Quack Pack (TV Series)	Supervising Animator - 1 Episode		
1997	Hercules	Supervising Animator	Zeus and Hera	
2000	Fantasia 2000	Lead Character Animator - Segment "Firebird Suite - 1919 Version"	Spring Sprite	
2001	Atlantis: The Lost Empire	Supervising Animator	Gaetan Molière	End Credited and known as Anthony de Rosa
2002	Treasure Planet	Animator	Captain Long John Silver	End Credited and known as Anthony De Rosa
2003	Looney Tunes: Back in Action	Lead Animator		End Credited and known as Anthony Derosa
2004	Home on the Range	Animator	Maggie	End Credited and known as Anthony De Rosa
2004	Mickey, Donald, Goofy: The Three Musketeers (Video)	Character Animator		
2004	Fat Albert	Animator		End Credited and known as Anthony de Rosa
2006	Curious George	Lead Animator	George	
2007	The Simpsons Movie	Animator		
2009	Pups of Liberty (Short)	Animator		
2009	The Princess and the Frog	Supervising Animator	Lawrence	
2011	Winnie the Pooh	Animator		
2012	Paperman (Short)	Final Line Animator		
2013	Get a Horse! (Short)	Animator		
2015	Pups of Liberty: The Dog-claration of Independence (Short)	Supervising Animator		
2016	Zootopia	Animator		
2016	Moana	Animator		
2018	Ralph Breaks the Internet	Animator		
2019	Lightning in a Bottle (short)	Animator		
2019	Frozen II	Animator		
2020	Just a Thought (short)	Final Line Animator		
2021	Raya and the Last Dragon	Animator		
2021	The Mitchells vs. the Machines	Animator		
2021	Luca	Animator		
2021	Space Jam: A New Legacy	Animator		
