= Hakuna Matata (song) =

1994 song from The Lion King film

Song by Nathan Lane, Ernie Sabella, Jason Weaver and Joseph Williams

from the album The Lion King: Original Motion Picture Soundtrack
- Released: May 31, 1994
- Length: 3:33
- Label: Walt Disney
- Composer: Elton John
- Lyricist: Tim Rice
- Producers: Jay Rifkin; Fabian Cooke; Mark Mancina

"Hakuna Matata" is a song from Disney's 1994 animated feature film The Lion King. The music was written by Elton John with lyrics by Tim Rice. The song is based on Timon and Pumbaa's catchphrase, originating from the Swahili language, Hakuna matata; it is translated by Disney as meaning “no worries".

== Rhythm of the Pride Lands edition ==
"Hakuna Matata"
- Cover of the Jimmy Cliff and Lebo M version

Single by Jimmy Cliff and Lebo M

from the album Rhythm of the Pride Lands
- B-side: "He Lives in You"; "Warthog Rhapsody"
- Released: February 28, 1995
- Length: 4:24
- Label: Walt Disney
- Composer: Elton John
- Lyricist: Tim Rice

Audio sample
- Jimmy Cliff & Lebo M - "Hakuna Matata": file; help

The second version of "Hakuna Matata" (sung by Jimmy Cliff and Lebo M) is a single from the 1995 soundtrack Rhythm of the Pride Lands.

== The Lion King 1½ (2004) ==
The third version of "Hakuna Matata" (sung once again by Lane and Sabella, but this time without Weaver or Williams) is from the 2004 film The Lion King 1½. This version remains unreleased on the soundtrack; the version included is instead the first version from the original film.

== The Lion King (2019) ==
"Hakuna Matata"

Song by Billy Eichner, with Seth Rogen, JD McCrary and Donald Glover

from the album The Lion King: Original Motion Picture Soundtrack
- Released: June 11, 2019
- Length: 4:11
- Label: Walt Disney
- Composer: Elton John
- Lyricist: Tim Rice
- Producer: Pharrell Williams

The fourth version of "Hakuna Matata" (sung by Billy Eichner as Timon, with Seth Rogen as Pumbaa, JD McCrary as young Simba and Donald McKinley Glover Jr. as adult Simba) is a song from the remake film.

== Music ==
The song's music and melody were composed by Elton John, with lyrics by Tim Rice. In the film the song is sung by Timon (voiced by Nathan Lane), Pumbaa (voiced by Ernie Sabella), and Simba, a young lion voiced by Jason Weaver (singing voice as a cub) and Joseph Williams (singing voice as an adult). Taking place after Mufasa's death, it features Timon and Pumbaa, the two main comic relief characters in the film, talking to Simba about moving forward from their troubled pasts and forgetting their worries, and Simba grows from cub to adult as the song progresses. The song also provides a backstory for Pumbaa, explaining that he was ostracized from animal society for his excessive flatulence. It makes use of a large proportion of the orchestra as well as many other more unusual instruments including an elaborate drum kit. Rice is said to have got the idea for the lyrics for the song from watching the comedy series Bottom and at one point wanted the show's stars Rik Mayall and Adrian Edmondson to play Timon and Pumbaa.

A second version of the song, produced for the companion album Rhythm of the Pride Lands, was performed by Jimmy Cliff featuring Lebo M. This version has a slightly modified, previously unreleased verse focusing on Timon's past. It was partially rewritten with a different instrument arrangement, but remains very similar to the original. This version of the song was released as a single with "He Lives in You" as a B-side and was ultimately used in the Broadway theatrical version of The Lion King.

== Production ==
"Hakuna Matata" replaced another song written early on in the production stage, titled "Warthog Rhapsody". This song was eventually recorded and released on Rhythm of the Pride Lands, along with several other songs that did not appear in the finished film. The vocal melody of "Warthog Rhapsody" was later used for the song "That's All I Need" in the spinoff film The Lion King 1½.

== Meaning ==
Hakuna matata is a phrase in Swahili. Disney translates the phrase as "No worries." "Hakuna" means "there is no" and "matata' can be translated as "troubles" or "worries." It can be translated as "no trouble here." It originally expresses resilience and adaptability in East African cultures. In the The Lion King, the phrase takes on a more light-hearted and carefree tone.

In a behind-the-scenes segment on The Lion King Special Edition DVD, the film's production team claim that it picked up the term from a tour guide while on safari in Kenya. It was then developed into an ideology that, along with the seemingly antithetical value of duty to the monarchy, is central to the moral content of the film.

The title phrase is pronounced with American English phonology within the song, including a flapped "t", rather than as it is pronounced in Swahili.

== Critical reception ==
"Hakuna Matata" has become one of Disney's most celebrated and popular songs. The song was nominated for Best Song at the 67th Academy Awards but lost to "Can You Feel the Love Tonight", one of three Lion King song nominations (the third one was "Circle of Life"). It was also ranked 99th in the AFI's list of the 100 best American movie songs of all time, Disney's seventh and last entry of songs on the list (the others being "When You Wish Upon a Star" from Pinocchio at #7, "Some Day My Prince Will Come" from Snow White and the Seven Dwarfs at #19, "Supercalifragilisticexpialidocious" from Mary Poppins at #36, "Wind Beneath My Wings" from Beaches at #44, "Zip-A-Dee-Doo-Dah" from Song of the South at #47, and "Beauty and the Beast" from Beauty and the Beast at #62).

A shortened version of "Hakuna Matata" was used as the theme song of the spinoff TV series Timon & Pumbaa. Another shortened version of "Hakuna Matata" was used in the TV series The Lion Guard in the first-season episode "Bunga and the King" (2016), sung by the cast members.

The film's 2019 photorealistic CGI remake features a version performed by Billy Eichner as Timon, Seth Rogen as Pumbaa, JD McCrary as young Simba, and Donald Glover as adult Simba.

Disney trademarked the phrase "Hakuna matata" in 2003 for merchandise. This has led to criticism that the company has appropriated a cultural phrase and turned it into a commodity.

== Track listings ==
CD single

1. "Hakuna Matata" – 4:24
2. "He Lives in You" – 4:51

CD maxi

1. "Hakuna Matata" (radio version) – 3:50
2. "Warthog Rhapsody" by Nathan Lane & Ernie Sabella – 3:06
3. "Hakuna Matata" (album version) – 4:24

== Charts ==
=== Weekly charts ===
Chart (1995)	Peak position
Belgium (Ultratop 50 Flanders)	46
Belgium (Ultratop 50 Wallonia)	6
Canada Top Singles (RPM)	45
Canada Adult Contemporary (RPM)	34
Europe (Eurochart Hot 100)	39
France (SNEP)	7
Germany (GfK)	77
Iceland (Íslenski Listinn Topp 40)	2
Italy Airplay (Music & Media)	8
Netherlands (Dutch Top 40)	11
Netherlands (Single Top 100)	77
Switzerland (Schweizer Hitparade)	32
US Bubbling Under Hot 100 Singles (Billboard)	5
US Adult Contemporary (Billboard)	26

=== Year-end charts ===
Chart (1995)	Position
Belgium (Ultratop 50 Wallonia)	35
France (SNEP)	27
Iceland (Íslenski Listinn Topp 40)	48
Netherlands (Dutch Top 40)	81

== Certifications ==
Region	Certification	Certified units/sales
France (SNEP)	Gold	250,000^{*}
United Kingdom (BPI) Film version	Platinum	600,000^{‡}
United States (RIAA)	2× Platinum	2,000,000^{‡}
^{*} Sales figures based on certification alone.^{‡} Sales+streaming figures based on certification alone.

== In popular culture ==
- Alvin and the Chipmunks covered the song in their 1995 album When You Wish Upon a Chipmunk, with Alvin and Simon performing Timon and Pumbaa's parts, respectively, and replacing "warthog" with "chipmunk".
- In Mouse Hunt, Ernie Smuntz (played by Nathan Lane, the voice of Timon) says "hakuna matata" to a guest at the house auction.
- In one of Disney's many self references, the "Hakuna Matata" song can be heard briefly in the 1995 Disney·Pixar film Toy Story, in which it was played in Andy's mother's car while Molly sees Woody, Buzz Lightyear and Slinky Dog through one of the side-view mirrors. "Hakuna Matata" is referenced in Aladdin and the King of Thieves when Genie turns into Pumbaa and says, "Hakuna Matata".
- In the Seinfeld episode "The Merv Griffin Show", Elaine says that she was caught in the office singing "Hakuna Matata".
- An instrumental version of this song appears in Mannheim Steamroller's 1999 album Mannheim Steamroller Meets the Mouse. It features various African chants, but ends with the phrase "You Got a Problem with That".
- The song was covered by Bahamian group Baha Men for the first Disneymania album.
- The song was covered by Debby Ryan for the Disneymania 7 album.
- The 2012 Japanese album Disney - Koe no Oujisama vol. 2, which features various Japanese voice actors covering Disney songs, includes a version of "Hakuna Matata" sung by Hiro Shimono and Nobuhiko Okamoto. A subsequent album with a similar concept, Disney - Koe no Durimu Dyuetto (2014), includes a version sung by Mitsuki Saiga and Katsuyuki Konishi, whereas an additional version by Tasuku Hatanaka is featured on the 2018 album Disney Koe no Ōji-sama Voice Stars Dream Selection.
- In 2015, the song was including in a Lion King songs medley performed by YouTuber and singer Georgia Merry.
- A parody of the song, Hasa Diga Eebowai, features in the musical The Book of Mormon.
- For the Saturday Night Live 50th Anniversary Special in 2025, Nathan Lane (Timon's voice actor) sung a parody of this song alongside John Mulaney, but it was tongue-in-cheek, and about the crackhead era of the 80s.
