= Bradley Raymond =

America film director

- Occupations: Film director; animator; storyboard artist
- Years active: 1993–present
- Employer: The Walt Disney Company

Bradley Raymond is an American film director, animator and storyboard artist best known for his work on animated shows and films as well as working at Disney. He has directed numerous sequels including Pocahontas II: Journey to a New World (1998), The Hunchback of Notre Dame II (2002), and The Lion King 1½ (2004). Raymond also directed Tinker Bell (2008), Tinker Bell and the Great Fairy Rescue (2010), and the television special Pixie Hollow Games (2011).

== Filmography ==
=== Storyboard ===
- Bonkers (1993)
- The All-New Dennis the Menace (1993)
- Aladdin (1994)
- Thumbelina (1994)
- A Troll in Central Park (1994)
- Quack Pack (1996)
- Cats Don't Dance (1997)

=== Animator ===
- Cats Don't Dance (1997)

=== Assistant animator ===
- A Troll in Central Park (1994)

=== Writer ===
- Tinker Bell (2008)
- Tinker Bell and the Great Fairy Rescue (2010)
- Raya and the Last Dragon (2021), "based on story ideas by" credit

=== Director ===
- Pocahontas II: Journey to a New World (1998)
- Mickey's Once Upon a Christmas (1999) (segment "Donald Duck: Stuck on Christmas")
- The Hunchback of Notre Dame II (2002)
- The Lion King 1½ (2004)
- Tinker Bell (2008)
- Tinker Bell and the Great Fairy Rescue (2010)
- Pixie Hollow Games (2011) (TV special)
- Green Eggs and Ham (2022) (TV series, 5 episodes)

=== Dialogue director ===
- The Lion King 1½ (2004)

=== Story consultant ===
- Pooh's Heffalump Movie (2005)

=== Senior creative team ===
- The Lion King 1½ (2004)
- Tinker Bell (2008)
- Secret of the Wings (2012)
- Planes (2013)
- The Pirate Fairy (2014)
- Planes: Fire & Rescue (2014)
