= Ernie Sabella =

American actor (born 1949)

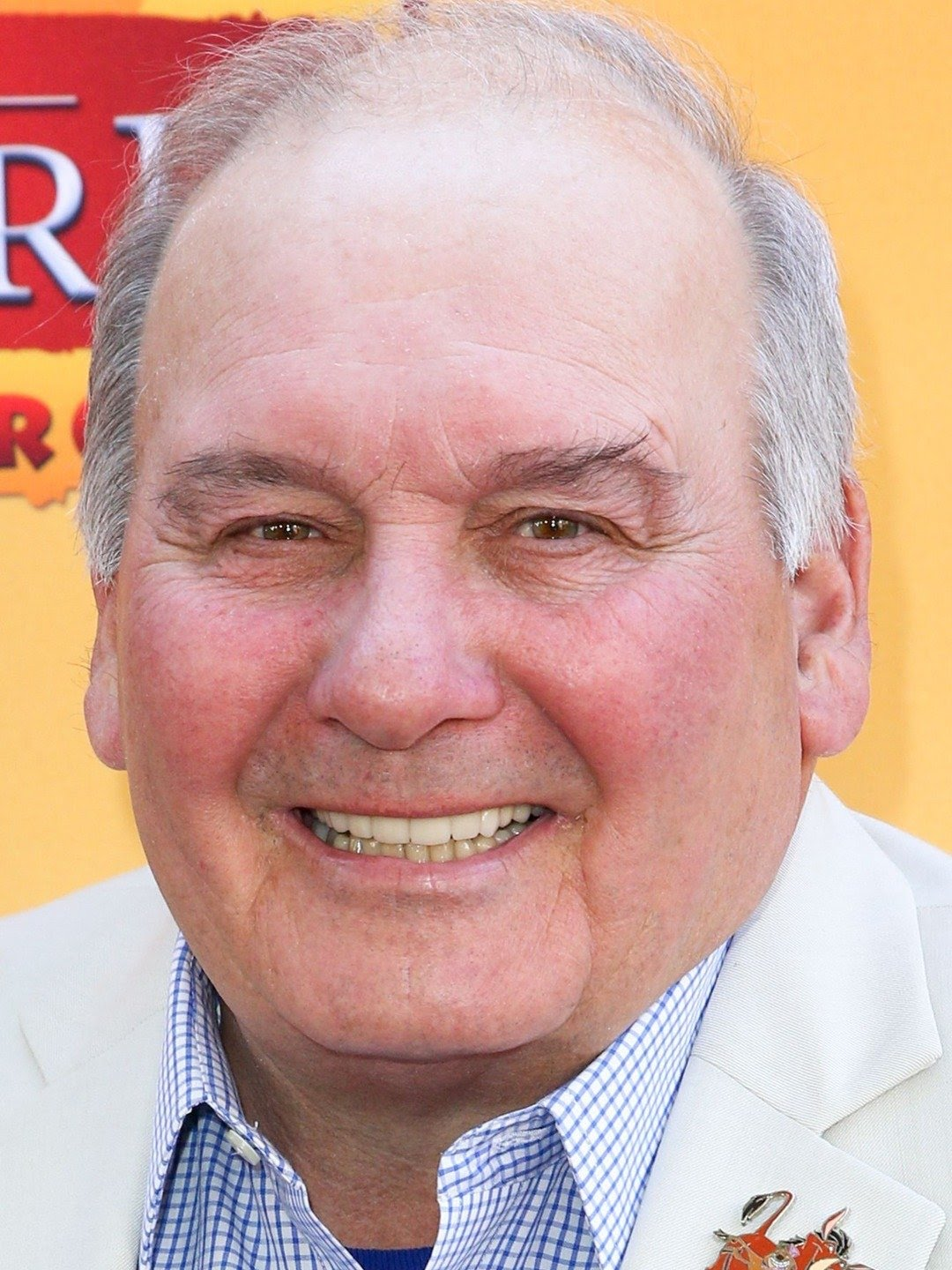
- Sabella in 2015
- Born: Ernest Sabella; September 19, 1949 (age 77); Westchester County, New York, U.S.
- Education: University of Miami
- Occupation: Actor
- Years active: 1976–present
- Spouse: Cheryl Sabella (m. 1999)

Ernest Sabella (born September 19, 1949) is an American actor. He is best known for his role as Pumbaa from The Lion King franchise, voicing the character in all media except the 2019 and 2024 films. Sabella's TV roles include Mr. Donald "Twinkie" Twinkacetti in Perfect Strangers (1986–1987), George Shipman in A Fine Romance (1989), and Leon Carosi in Saved by the Bell (1991). His work in Broadway theatre includes starring roles in Guys and Dolls, Chicago, Curtains, and Man of La Mancha.

== Early life and education ==
Born in Westchester County, New York, Sabella graduated from the University of Miami, where he studied at the Department of Theatre Arts and performed at the university's Jerry Herman Ring Theatre.

== Career ==
His stage credits include The Robber Bridegroom (1976), Little Johnny Jones (1982), Guys and Dolls (1992) as Harry the Horse, A Funny Thing Happened on the Way to the Forum (1996), Chicago as Amos Hart (replacement), Man of La Mancha (2002, as Sancho Panza) and Sweet Charity (2005).

Film credits include Quiz Show (1994) as the car salesman, In & Out (1997) as Aldo Hooper, Disney's The Lion King (1994) and multiple sequels and spin-offs as Pumbaa. He also has worked with Nathan Lane, who had voiced Timon, in Guys and Dolls, Mouse Hunt, The Producers (in a deleted scene) and A Funny Thing Happened on the Way to the Forum. In the latter production, Sabella portrayed Marcus Lycus while Lane played Pseudolus. Sabella also joined Lane for his Saturday Night Live monologue, where they sang "Hakuna Matata".

On television, Sabella portrayed apartment manager Lou Donatelli in the Jason Bateman comedy It's Your Move (1984–1985). He appeared in an episode of Cheers titled "Love Thy Neighbor" (Season Four Episode Eight air date November 21, 1985) in which he played the role of a private investigator named Santo Carbone, who was Carla Tortelli's cousin. He played store owner and landlord Donald Twinkacetti on Perfect Strangers (1986–1987). He played Leo in the short-lived sitcom Encore! Encore! starring Nathan Lane (2000). Sabella had a five-episode stint on Saved by the Bell in 1991 as Leon Carosi, an uptight resort manager and owner who employed the main cast's characters. Leah Remini was featured as his daughter. His other recurring roles include the lazy teacher Mr. Petrachelli on That's So Raven (2003), the floundering attorney Harland Bassett on The Practice (2000–2001), and characters on Newhart (1983).

In the Quantum Leap episode "Catch a Falling Star", he played the dual role of Manny, a stage actor, and Sancho Panza, Manny's character in a touring production of Man of La Mancha. Sabella had a brief appearance as a naked man on a subway train in a 1992 episode of Seinfeld titled "The Subway".

He starred in a series of television commercials for NyQuil cold medicine in 1994 and was seen in a MasterCard commercial (2007), as well as Lynx in 2008.

Sabella co-starred as Sidney Bernstein in the Broadway musical comedy Curtains, which opened officially on March 22, 2007, and ran until June 29, 2008.

He played the role of apartment building superintendent Leon in the 9th episode "Hold Outs" of the 6th season (2015) of the CBS police procedural drama Blue Bloods.

In 2015, Sabella reprised his voice role as Pumbaa in the TV pilot film The Lion Guard: Return of the Roar. He later became a recurring cast member in the full series, The Lion Guard.

== Personal life ==
Sabella met his wife Cheryl near the backstage door following a Broadway performance of Guys & Dolls in 1994; they married in 1999. His wife works as a computer programmer in their hometown.

== Filmography ==
=== Film ===
Year	Title	Role	Notes
1984	City Heat	Ballistics Expert	
1986	Tough Guys	Hotel Clerk	
1988	Fright Night Part 2	Dr. Harrison	
1990	Faith	Stanley	
1990	Going Under	The Mole	
1994	The Lion King	Pumbaa	Voice
1994	Quiz Show	Car Salesman	
1995	Roommates	Stash	
1996	Around the World with Timon & Pumbaa	Pumbaa	Voice, direct-to-video
1997	In & Out	Aldo Hopper	
1997	Mouse Hunt	Maury, the Cat Care Society Owner	
1998	The Lion King II: Simba's Pride	Pumbaa	Voice, direct-to-video
1999	The Out-of-Towners	Getaway Driver	
2001	Mickey's Magical Christmas: Snowed in at the House of Mouse	Pumbaa	Voice, direct-to-video
2004	The Lion King 1½	Pumbaa	Voice, direct-to-video
2010	Listen to Your Heart	Tony	
2015	The Challenger	Frankie	
2016	Bakery in Brooklyn	Dave	

=== Television ===
Year	Title	Role	Notes
1980	Broadway on Showtime	Sing Song, Big Harp	2 episodes
1982	St. Elsewhere	Patient	Episode: "Pilot"
1982–1984	Cagney & Lacey	Cabbie	2 episodes
1983	The New Odd Couple	Policeman	Episode: "My Strife in Court"
1983	13 Thirteenth Avenue	Vlastock Spoltechzep	Television film
1983	Newhart	Ed Halstead, Police Officer	3 episodes
1983–1984	Knots Landing	Frank Edmunds	2 episodes
1983–1987	Hill Street Blues	Pauli, Paulie Shellcop, Paulie	4 episodes
1984	Alice	Franklin	Episode: "Vera, the Horse Thief"
1984	Oh Madeline	Phelps	Episode: "Monday Night Madeline"
1984	The Facts of Life	Husband	Episode: "All by Herself"
1984	The New Mike Hammer	Salvatore Juno	2 episodes
1984	Domestic Life	Ralph Pomeroy	Episode: "Showdown at Walla Walla"
1984	100 Centre Street	Harry Pike	Television film
1984	Punky Brewster	Elroy Kramer	Episode: "Parents Night"
1984–1985	It's Your Move	Lou Donatelli	18 episodes
1985	Diff'rent Strokes	Ben	Episode: "Sam's Missing"
1985	Hardcastle and McCormick	Clyde Whitley	Episode: "Strange Hold"
1985	Cheers	Santo Carbone, Stan	2 episodes
1985	Copacabana	Sam Gropper	Television film
1986	It's a Living	Walter Cliff	Episode: "Gander Gap"
1986	Benson	Bo	Episode: "Parade Rest"
1986–1987	Perfect Strangers	Mr. Donald 'Twinkie' Twinkacetti	22 episodes
1987	Roxie	Vito Carteri	6 episodes
1987	Married... with Children	Mr. Pond	Episode: "Peggy Sue Got Work"
1987	Hunter	Earnie	Episode: "Turning Point"
1988	Sledge Hammer!	Al Fresco	Episode: "The Secret of My Excess"
1988	Mr. Belvedere	Mr. Plumer	Episode: "Roommates"
1989	A Fine Romance	George Shipman	13 episodes
1989	Open House		Episode: "Murder, He Wrote"
1989	My Two Dads	Officer Ringer	Episode: "Dad Patrol"
1989	Quantum Leap	Manny, Sancho Panza	Episode: "Catch a Falling Star - May 21, 1979"
1990	Coach	Ernie	Episode: "Men Don't Heal"
1990–1991	Good Grief	Tyrone, Flipper	2 episodes
1991	Babes	Mo	Episode: "The Last Temptation of Marlene"
1991	Murphy Brown	Julian	Episode: "Small"
1991	Saved by the Bell	Leon Carosi	6 episodes
1991	Major Dad	Phil	Episode: "Lady in Waiting"
1992	Seinfeld	Naked Man	Episode: "The Subway"
1992	A Different World	Campus Security	Episode: "The Cat's in the Cradle"
1992	Davis Rules	Coach	Episode: "Strike Down the Band"
1992	Dangerous Curves	Jack Kilty	Episode: "Die Laughing"
1992	Just My Imagination	Arnold Mayer	Television film
1994	Mad About You	Maurice	Episode: "Till Death Do Us Part"
1995	Pins and Needles	Marvin	Television film
1995	Blame It on Ernie	Unknown role	Unknown episodes
1995–1999	Timon & Pumbaa	Pumbaa, Bampuu, Gopher	Voice, main role
1997	Disney's One Saturday Morning	Pumbaa	Voice
1998–1999	Encore! Encore!	Leo	5 episodes
1999–2001	The Practice	Harland Bassett	4 episodes
1999	Malcolm & Eddie	Mort Diamond	Episode: "The Tapawingo Witch Project"
1999	Annie	Mr. Bundles	Television film
2000	Find Out Why	Pumbaa	Voice, 8 episodes
2000	Providence	Lou Keppler	3 episodes
2001	Ed	Gary Swirdlock	Episode: "Hook, Line and Sinker"
2001–2002	House of Mouse	Pumbaa	Voice, 14 episodes
2003	That's So Raven	Mr. Petrachelli	2 episodes
2015	Blue Bloods	Leon	Episode: "Holds Out"
2015	The Lion Guard: Return of the Roar	Pumbaa	Voice, television film
2016–2019	The Lion Guard	Pumbaa	Voice, 10 episodes

=== Video games ===
Year	Title	Role
1995	Animated Storybook: The Lion King	Pumbaa
1995	Timon & Pumbaa's Jungle Pinball	Pumbaa
1995	The Lion King: Activity Center	Pumbaa
1995	Timon & Pumbaa's Jungle Games	Pumbaa
1998	Disney's Adventures in Typing with Timon and Pumbaa	Pumbaa
1998	The Lion King II: Simba's Pride Active Play	Pumbaa
2000	The Lion King: Simba's Mighty Adventure	Pumbaa
2003	Timon & Pumbaa Virtual Safari	Pumbaa
2004	Who Wants to be King of the Jungle	Pumbaa
2005	Kingdom Hearts II	Pumbaa
2007	Kingdom Hearts II Final Mix	Pumbaa
2024	Disney Dreamlight Valley	Pumbaa

=== Theme park attractions ===
Year	Title	Role
1995–2018	Circle of Life: An Environmental Fable	Pumbaa
2008–2013	Wild About Safety	Pumbaa

== Theatre ==
Year	Title	Role	Notes
1976–1977	The Robber Bridegroom	Big Harp, Little Harp	Broadway
1982	Little Johnny Jones	Whitney Wilson	Tour
1983	Merrily We Roll Along	Joseph Josephson	Dupree Studio Theatre
1990	A Funny Thing Happened on the Way to the Forum	Pseudolus	La Jolla Playhouse & Segerstrom Center for the Arts
1992	Guys and Dolls	Harry the Horse	Broadway
1994	How to Succeed in Business Without Really Trying	Twimble / Wally Womper	La Jolla Playhouse
1996	A Funny Thing Happened on the Way to the Forum	Marcus Lycus	Broadway
1997	Chicago	Amos Hart	Broadway & Tour Replacement
2002	Man of La Mancha	Sancho Panza	Broadway
2004–2005	Sweet Charity	Herman	Broadway
2007–2008	Curtains	Sidney Bernstein	Broadway

== Awards and nominations ==
- 1996 - Daytime Emmy Award - Outstanding Performer in an Animated Program - Nominated
- 2005 - DVDX Award for Best Animated Character Performance (Voice and Animation in a DVD Premiere Movie) - Nominated
