= The Lion King =

1994 American animated film

- Theatrical release poster by John Alvin
- Directed by: Roger Allers; Rob Minkoff
- Screenplay by: Irene Mecchi; Jonathan Roberts; Linda Woolverton
- Story by: Barry Johnson; Andy Gaskill; Kevin Harkey; Tom Sito; Rick Maki; Burny Mattinson; Lorna Cook; Gary Trousdale; Jorgen Klubien; Larry Leker; Ed Gombert; Mark Kausler; Thom Enriquez; Jim Capobianco; Chris Sanders; Joe Ranft; Francis Glebas
- Produced by: Don Hahn
- Starring: Matthew Broderick; James Earl Jones; Jeremy Irons; Jonathan Taylor Thomas; Moira Kelly; Niketa Calame; Ernie Sabella; Nathan Lane; Robert Guillaume; Rowan Atkinson; Whoopi Goldberg; Cheech Marin; Jim Cummings; Madge Sinclair
- Edited by: Ivan Bilancio
- Music by: Hans Zimmer
- Production company: Walt Disney Feature Animation
- Distributed by: Buena Vista Pictures Distribution (Note: Distributed under the Walt Disney Pictures banner.)
- Release dates: June 15, 1994 (El Capitan Theatre); June 24, 1994 (United States)
- Running time: 88 minutes
- Country: United States
- Language: English
- Budget: $45 million
- Box office: $979 million

The Lion King is a 1994 American animated musical drama film directed by Roger Allers and Rob Minkoff and written by Irene Mecchi, Jonathan Roberts, and Linda Woolverton. Produced by Walt Disney Feature Animation, it features an ensemble voice cast consisting of Matthew Broderick, James Earl Jones, Jeremy Irons, Jonathan Taylor Thomas, Moira Kelly, Niketa Calame, Madge Sinclair, Nathan Lane, Ernie Sabella, Whoopi Goldberg, Cheech Marin, Rowan Atkinson, and Robert Guillaume. The story follows a young lion prince named Simba, who is exiled from his kingdom after his father, King Mufasa, is murdered by his uncle Scar, who usurps the throne. As he grows up, Simba must decide whether to return to his homeland to confront Scar and reclaim his rightful place as king.

The Lion King was conceived during conversations among various Disney executives, to whom several writers submitted early treatments under the title King of the Jungle. Original director George Scribner had envisioned The Lion King as a nature documentary-style film, with Allers joining as co-director. The Lion King's plot draws inspiration from several sources, notably Bambi (1942), William Shakespeare's play Hamlet, as well as the Bible. Woolverton, the screenwriter for Disney's Beauty and the Beast (1991), drafted early scripts for The Lion King before Mecchi and Roberts were hired to revise once Woolverton left to prioritize other projects. Scribner departed due to disagreements over the studio's decision to reimagine the film as a musical, with original songs by Elton John and Tim Rice. Minkoff was hired to replace him in April 1992. Throughout production, the creative team visited Kenya for research and inspiration.

Released in theaters on June 24, 1994 by Walt Disney Pictures, The Lion King was praised by critics for its music, story, themes, and animation. With an initial worldwide gross of $763 million, it completed its theatrical run as the highest-grossing film of 1994 and the second-highest-grossing film of all time, behind Jurassic Park (1993). It held the title of highest-grossing animated film until it was replaced by Finding Nemo in 2003. The film remains the highest-grossing traditionally animated film of all time. The film was also the best-selling film on home video, having sold over 55 million copies worldwide. It won two Academy Awards, as well as the Golden Globe Award for Best Motion Picture – Musical or Comedy.

The success of the film launched a multibillion-dollar franchise comprising a Broadway adaptation, two direct-to-video follow-ups, two television series, and a photorealistic remake (which itself spawned a prequel), which in 2019 also became the highest-grossing animated film at the time of its release. In 2016, The Lion King was selected for preservation in the United States National Film Registry by the Library of Congress as being "culturally, historically, or aesthetically significant".The film is considered one of the greatest animated films ever made.

== Plot ==
In the Pride Lands of Eastern Africa, a pride of lions rules over the kingdom from Pride Rock. King Mufasa and Queen Sarabi's newborn son, Simba, is presented to the gathered animals by Rafiki, an elderly mandrill who is the kingdom's shaman and advisor. Mufasa's younger brother, Scar, covets the throne and plots to eliminate Mufasa and Simba so that he may become king.

When Simba grows into a young cub, Mufasa shows him the Pride Lands and forbids him to explore beyond its borders. Mufasa explains to Simba the responsibilities of kingship and the "circle of life," which connects all living things. Scar manipulates Simba into exploring an elephants' graveyard beyond the Pride Lands. There, Simba and his best friend, Nala, are chased by three spotted hyenas named Shenzi, Banzai, and Ed. Mufasa is alerted by his majordomo, the hornbill Zazu, and rescues the cubs. Though disappointed in Simba for disobeying him and endangering himself and Nala, Mufasa forgives him. He explains that the great kings of the past watch over them from the night sky, from which he will one day watch over Simba. Scar visits the hyenas and convinces them to help him kill Mufasa and Simba in exchange for hunting rights in the Pride Lands.

Scar lures Simba into a gorge and signals the hyenas to drive a large herd of wildebeest into a stampede to trample him. He then alerts Mufasa, who saves Simba and tries to escape the gorge, but Scar betrays him by throwing him into the stampede to his death. As Simba mourns his father, Scar deceives him into believing that Mufasa's death was his fault and tells him to leave the kingdom and never return. He orders the hyenas to kill Simba, but Simba escapes. Unaware of Simba's survival, Scar tells the pride that the stampede killed both Mufasa and Simba, and steps forward as the new king, allowing the hyenas into the Pride Lands.

Simba collapses in a desert but is rescued by two outcasts, a meerkat and a warthog named Timon and Pumbaa. Simba grows up with his two new friends in their oasis, living a carefree life under their motto "hakuna matata" ("no worries" in Swahili). Years later, an adult Simba rescues Timon and Pumbaa from a hungry lioness, who is revealed to be Nala. Simba and Nala fall in love with each other on their night out, and she urges him to return home, telling him that the Pride Lands have recently become stricken by a severe drought under Scar's tyranny. Still feeling guilty over Mufasa's death, Simba refuses and leaves angrily. He encounters Rafiki, who tells Simba that Mufasa's spirit lives on in him. Simba is visited by the spirit of Mufasa in the night sky, who tells him that he must take his place as the rightful king. After Rafiki advises him to learn from the past instead of running from it, Simba decides to return to the Pride Lands.

With the help of his friends, Simba sneaks past the hyenas at Pride Rock and confronts Scar, who shames Simba over his alleged role in Mufasa's death. Nearly pushing Simba off a cliff, Scar whispers that he was the one who killed Mufasa. Enraged, Simba retaliates and forces Scar to confess the truth to the pride. A battle breaks out between Simba and his allies and the hyenas. Scar attempts to escape but is cornered by Simba at the top of Pride Rock. Scar begs for mercy, falsely blaming his actions on the hyenas. Simba orders Scar to leave the Pride Lands forever; Scar appears to accept this, but then he deceitfully attacks Simba. After a brief struggle, Simba throws Scar off the ledge. Although Scar survives the fall, the hyenas, having overheard his betrayal, maul him to death.

With Scar and the hyenas gone, Simba takes his place as king, and Nala becomes his queen. With the Pride Lands restored, Rafiki presents Simba and Nala's newborn cub to the assembled animals, thus continuing the circle of life.

== Voice cast ==
A promotional image of the characters from the film. From left to right: Shenzi, Scar, Ed, Banzai, Rafiki, Young Simba, Mufasa, Young Nala, Sarabi, Zazu, Sarafina, Timon, and Pumbaa.

- Matthew Broderick as Simba, a young lion crown prince, the son of Mufasa and Sarabi, who grows up to become the king of the Pride Lands. Rock singer Joseph Williams provided Simba's singing voice. (Note: Mark Henn and Ruben A. Aquino respectively were the supervising animators for young and adult Simba.)
  - Jonathan Taylor Thomas voiced young Simba, while Jason Weaver provided the cub's singing voice and Evan Saucedo also provided the cub's singing voice in "The Morning Report", a newly animated song which was added to the 2003 DVD Special Edition of The Lion King.
- Jeremy Irons as Scar, Mufasa's younger brother and rival, and Simba's uncle, who plots to seize the throne of the Pride Lands. Jim Cummings partially provided Scar's singing voice for the song "Be Prepared". (Note: Andreas Deja was the supervising animator for Scar.)
- James Earl Jones as Mufasa, Simba's father, Scar's older brother, Sarabi's mate, and the king of the Pride Lands at the beginning of the film. (Note: Tony Fucile was the supervising animator for Mufasa.)
- Moira Kelly as Nala, Simba's childhood best friend, who later becomes his mate and the queen of the Pride Lands. Sally Dworsky provided her singing voice. (Note: Aaron Blaise and Anthony de Rosa respectively were the supervising animators for young and adult Nala.)
  - Niketa Calame provided the voice of young Nala while Laura Williams provided her singing voice.
- Nathan Lane as Timon, a wise-cracking meerkat who becomes one of Simba's best friends. (Note: Michael Surrey was his supervising animator.)
- Ernie Sabella as Pumbaa, a naïve warthog who is Timon's best friend. He also becomes one of Simba's best friends. (Note: Tony Bancroft was his supervising animator.)
- Robert Guillaume as Rafiki, an old mandrill who serves as the shaman of the Pride Lands and ceremonially presents the newborn cubs of the King and Queen to the gathered animals. (Note: James Baxter was the supervising animator for Rafiki.)
- Rowan Atkinson as Zazu, an uptight hornbill who serves as the majordomo to the King of the Pride Lands. Jeff Bennett provided Zazu's singing voice in "The Morning Report", a newly animated song sequence which was added to the 2003 DVD Special Edition of The Lion King. (Note: Ellen Woodbury was the supervising animator for Zazu.)
- Madge Sinclair as Sarabi, Mufasa's mate, Simba's mother, and leader of the lioness hunting party, as well as the queen of the Pride Lands at the beginning of the film. (Note: Russ Edmonds was the supervising animator for Sarabi.)
- Whoopi Goldberg, Cheech Marin, and Jim Cummings as the three leaders of a clan of spotted hyenas, and allies of Scar who participate in his plot in the death of Mufasa. (Note: Animated by Alex Kupershmidt and David Burgess.)
  - Goldberg voices Shenzi, the sassy and short-tempered female leader of the trio.
  - Marin voices Banzai, an aggressive and hot-headed hyena prone to complaining and acting on impulse.
  - Cummings voices Ed, a dimwitted hyena who does not talk, only communicating through laughter.
    - Cummings also voiced a mole that talks with Zazu.
- Zoe Leader as Sarafina, Nala's mother, who is briefly shown talking to Simba's mother, Sarabi.

== Production ==
=== Development ===
The origin of the concept for The Lion King is widely disputed. According to Charlie Fink (then-Walt Disney Feature Animation's vice president for creative affairs), he approached Jeffrey Katzenberg, Roy E. Disney, and Peter Schneider with a "Bambi in Africa" idea with lions. Katzenberg balked at the idea at first, but nevertheless encouraged Fink and his writers to develop a mythos to explain how lions serviced other animals by eating them. Another anecdote states that the idea was conceived during a conversation between Katzenberg, Roy E. Disney, and Schneider on a flight to Europe during a promotional tour. (Note: In his book DisneyWar, James B. Stewart states it was a plane trip across Europe while promoting The Little Mermaid (1989). Allan Neuwirth and Don Hahn separately claimed it was for Oliver & Company (1988).) During the conversation, the topic of a story set in Africa came up, and Katzenberg immediately jumped at the idea. Katzenberg decided to add elements involving coming of age and death, and ideas from personal life experiences, such as some of his trials in his career in politics, saying about the film, "It is a little bit about myself."

On October 11, 1988, Thomas Disch (the author of The Brave Little Toaster) had met with Fink and Roy E. Disney to discuss the idea, and within the next month, he had written a nine-paged treatment entitled King of the Kalahari. Throughout 1989, several Disney staff writers, including Jenny Tripp, Tim Disney, Valerie West and Miguel Tejada-Flores, had written treatments for the project. Tripp's treatment, dated on March 2, 1989, introduced the name "Simba" for the main character, who gets separated from his pride and is adopted by Kwashi, a baboon, and Mabu, a mongoose. He is later raised in a community of baboons. Simba battles an evil jackal named Ndogo, and reunites with his pride. Later that same year, Fink recruited his friend J. T. Allen, a writer, to develop new story treatments. Fink and Allen had earlier made several trips to a Los Angeles zoo to observe the animal behavior that was to be featured in the script. Allen completed his script, which was titled The Lion King, on January 19, 1990. However, Fink, Katzenberg, and Roy E. Disney felt Allen's script could benefit from a more experienced screenwriter, and turned to Ronald Bass, who had recently won an Academy Award for Best Original Screenplay for Rain Man (1988). At the time, Bass was too preoccupied to rewrite the script himself, but agreed to supervise the revisions. The new script, credited to both Allen and Bass, was retitled King of the Beasts and completed on May 23, 1990.

Sometime later, Linda Woolverton, who was also writing Beauty and the Beast (1991), spent a year writing several drafts of the script, which was titled King of the Beasts and then King of the Jungle. The original version of the film was vastly different from the final product. The plot centered on a battle between lions and baboons, with Scar being the leader of the baboons, Rafiki being a cheetah, and Timon and Pumbaa being Simba's childhood friends. Simba would not only leave the kingdom but become a "lazy, slovenly, horrible character" due to manipulations from Scar, so Simba could be overthrown after coming of age. By 1990, producer Thomas Schumacher, who had just completed The Rescuers Down Under (1990), decided to attach himself to the project "because lions are cool". Schumacher likened the King of the Jungle script to "an animated National Geographic special".

George Scribner, who had directed Oliver & Company (1988), was the initial director of the film, being later joined by Roger Allers, who was the lead story man on Beauty and the Beast (1991). Allers worked with Scribner and Woolverton on the project, but temporarily left the project to help rewrite Aladdin (1992). Eight months later, Allers returned to the project, and brought Brenda Chapman and Chris Sanders with him. In October 1991, several of the lead crew members, including Allers, Scribner, Chapman, Sanders, and Lisa Keene visited Hell's Gate National Park in Kenya, in order to study and gain an appreciation of the environment for the film. After six months of story development work, Scribner decided to leave the project upon clashing with Allers and the producers over their decision to turn the film into a musical, since Scribner's intention was of making a documentary-like film more focused on natural aspects. By April 1992, Rob Minkoff had replaced Scribner as the new co-director.

Don Hahn joined the production as the film's producer because Schumacher was promoted to Vice President of Development for Walt Disney Feature Animation. Hahn found the script unfocused and lacking a clear theme, and after establishing the main theme as "leaving childhood and facing up to the realities of the world", asked for a final retool. Allers, Minkoff, Chapman, and Hahn then rewrote the story across two weeks of meetings with directors Kirk Wise and Gary Trousdale, who had finished directing Beauty and the Beast (1991). One of the definite ideas that stemmed from the meetings was to have Mufasa return as a ghost. Allers also changed the character Rafiki from a more serious court advisor into a wacky shaman. The title was also changed from King of the Jungle to The Lion King, as the setting was not the jungle but the savannah. It was also decided to make Mufasa and Scar brothers, as the writers felt it was much more interesting if the threat came from someone within the family.

Allers and Minkoff pitched the revised story to Katzenberg and Michael Eisner, to which Eisner felt the story "could be more Shakespearean"; he suggested modeling the story on King Lear. Maureen Donley, an associate producer, countered, stating that the story resembled Hamlet. Continuing on the idea, Allers recalled Katzenberg asking them to "put in as much Hamlet as you can". However, they felt it was too forced, and looked to other heroic archetypes such as the stories of Joseph and Moses from the Bible. Aside from Disney's prior anthology films and The Rescuers Down Under (1990) (a sequel to The Rescuers (1977)), The Lion King was Disney's second animated feature film to feature an original story conception after The Aristocats (1970), although the final product was heavily modelled on Hamlet, Joseph and Moses. The story has also been compared to Shakespeare's lesser known plays Henry IV, Part 1 and Part 2.

By this point, Woolverton had left the production to work on the Broadway adaptation of Beauty and the Beast. To replace her, Allers and Minkoff met with numerous screenwriters, including Billy Bob Thornton and Joss Whedon, to discuss writing the new screenplay. During the summer of 1992, Irene Mecchi was hired as the new screenwriter, and months later, she was joined by Jonathan Roberts. Mecchi and Roberts took charge of the revision process, fixing unresolved emotional issues in the script and adding comedic situations for Pumbaa, Timon, and the hyenas.

Lyricist Tim Rice worked closely with the screenwriting team, flying to California at least once a month, as his songs for the film needed to work in the narrative continuity. Rice's lyrics—which were reworked up to the production's end—were pinned to the storyboards during development. Rewrites were frequent, with animator Andreas Deja saying that completed scenes would be delivered, only for the response to be that parts needed to be reanimated because of dialogue changes. Due to the rewrites, The Lion King missed its initial release window for Thanksgiving 1993, with The Nightmare Before Christmas (1993) assuming its release slot. Hahn stated the film was delayed to a summer 1994 release, "with much consternation, because people said you can't release animation in the summertime."

=== Casting ===
The voice actors were chosen for how they fit and could add to the characters; for instance, James Earl Jones was cast because the directors found his voice "powerful" and similar to a lion's roar. Jones remarked that during the years of production, Mufasa "became more and more of a dopey dad instead of [a] grand king". Originally, Jess Harnell and Jim Cummings were Timon and Pumbaa during the production, recording a demo of "Hakuna Matata".

Nathan Lane auditioned for Zazu, and Ernie Sabella for one of the hyenas. Upon meeting at the recording studio, Lane and Sabella – who were starring together in a Broadway production of Guys and Dolls at the time – were asked to record together as hyenas. The directors loved the chemistry between Lane and Sabella when they auditioned for roles as hyenas/Zazu, so they decided to cast them as Timon and Pumbaa instead. For the hyenas, the original intention was to reunite Cheech & Chong, but while Cheech Marin agreed to voice Banzai, Tommy Chong was unavailable. His role was changed into a female hyena, Shenzi, voiced by Whoopi Goldberg, who insisted on being in the film. The English double act Vic Reeves and Bob Mortimer auditioned for roles as a pair of chipmunks; according to Mortimer, the producers were enthusiastic, but he and Reeves were uncomfortable with their corporate attitude and abandoned the film. Rowan Atkinson was initially uninterested in the studio's offer to voice Zazu, later explaining that "voice work is something I generally had never done and never liked [...] I'm a visual artist, if I'm anything, and it seemed to be a pointless thing to do". His friend and fellow Mr. Bean writer/actor Robin Driscoll convinced him to accept the role, and Atkinson retrospectively expressed that The Lion King became "a really, very special film".

Matthew Broderick was cast as adult Simba early during production. Broderick only recorded with another actor once over the three years he worked on the film, and only learned that Moira Kelly voiced Nala at the film's premiere. Tim Curry, Jonathan Pryce, David Ogden Stiers, John Lithgow, Michael Wincott, Malcolm McDowell, Alan Rickman, Patrick Stewart, and Ian McKellen were considered for the role of Scar, which eventually went to Jeremy Irons. Irons initially turned down the part, as he felt uncomfortable going to a comedic role after his dramatic portrayal of Claus von Bülow in Reversal of Fortune (1990). His performance in that film inspired the writers to incorporate more of his acting as von Bülow in the script – adding one of that character's lines, "You have no idea" – and prompted animator Andreas Deja to watch Reversal of Fortune and Damage (1992) in order to incorporate Irons' facial traits and tics.

=== Animation ===
"The Lion King was considered a little movie because we were going to take some risks. The pitch for the story was a lion cub gets framed for murder by his uncle set to the music of Elton John. People said, 'What? Good luck with that.' But for some reason, the people who ended up on the movie were highly passionate about it and motivated."

— Don Hahn

The development of The Lion King coincided with that of Pocahontas (1995), which most of the animators of Walt Disney Feature Animation decided to work on instead, believing it would be the more prestigious and successful of the two. The story artists also did not have much faith in the project, with Chapman declaring she was reluctant to accept the job "because the story wasn't very good", and Burny Mattinson telling his colleague Joe Ranft: "I don't know who is going to want to watch that one." Most of the leading animators either were doing their first major work supervising a character, or had much interest in animating an animal. Thirteen of these supervising animators, both in California and in Florida, were responsible for establishing the personalities and setting the tone for the film's main characters. The animation leads for the main characters included Mark Henn on young Simba, Ruben A. Aquino on adult Simba, Andreas Deja on Scar, Aaron Blaise on young Nala, Anthony DeRosa on adult Nala, and Tony Fucile on Mufasa. Nearly twenty minutes of the film, including the "I Just Can't Wait to Be King" sequence, was animated at the Disney-MGM Studios facility. More than 600 artists, animators, and technicians contributed to The Lion King. Six months before the film's release, the 1994 Northridge earthquake shut down the studio and required the animators to complete their work via remote work.

The character animators studied real-life animals for reference, as was done for Bambi (1942). Jim Fowler, renowned wildlife expert, visited the studios on several occasions with an assortment of lions and other savannah inhabitants to discuss behavior and help the animators give their drawings authenticity. The animators also studied animal movements at the Miami MetroZoo under guidance from wildlife expert Ron Magill. The Pride Lands are modeled on the Kenyan national park visited by the crew. Varied focal lengths and lenses were employed to differ from the habitual portrayal of Africa in documentaries—which employ telephoto lenses to shoot the wildlife from a distance. The epic feel drew inspiration from concept studies by artist Hans Bacher—who, following Scribner's request for realism, tried to depict effects such as lens flare—and the works of painters Charles Marion Russell, Frederic Remington, and Maxfield Parrish. Art director Andy Gaskill and the filmmakers sought to give the film a sense of grand sweep and epic scale similar to Lawrence of Arabia (1962). Gaskill explained: "We wanted audiences to sense the vastness of the savannah and to feel the dust and the breeze swaying through the grass. In other words, to get a real sense of nature and to feel as if they were there. It's very difficult to capture something as subtle as a sunrise or rain falling on a pond, but those are the kinds of images that we tried to get." The filmmakers also watched the films of John Ford and other filmmakers, which also influenced the design of the film.

Because the characters were not anthropomorphized, all the animators had to learn to draw four-legged animals, and the story and character development was done through the use of longer shots following the characters.

Computers helped the filmmakers present their vision in new ways. For the wildebeest stampede sequence, several distinct wildebeest characters were created in a 3D computer program, multiplied into hundreds, cel shaded to look like drawn animation, and given randomized paths down a mountainside to simulate the real, unpredictable movement of a herd. Five specially trained animators and technicians spent more than two years creating the two-and-a-half-minute stampede. The Computer Animation Production System (CAPS) helped simulate camera movements such as tracking shots, and was employed in coloring, lighting, and particle effects.

== Music ==
Lyricist Tim Rice, who was working with composer Alan Menken on songs for Aladdin (1992), was invited to write songs for The Lion King, and accepted on the condition of bringing in a composing partner. As Menken was unavailable, the producers accepted Rice's suggestion of Elton John, after Rice's invitation of ABBA fell through due to Benny Andersson's commitments to the stage musical Kristina från Duvemåla. John expressed an interest in writing "ultra-pop songs that kids would like; then adults can go and see those movies and get just as much pleasure out of them", mentioning a possible influence of The Jungle Book (1967), where he felt the "music was so funny and appealed to kids and adults".

Rice and John wrote five original songs for The Lion King ("Circle of Life", "I Just Can't Wait to Be King", "Be Prepared", "Hakuna Matata", and "Can You Feel the Love Tonight"), with John's performance of "Can You Feel the Love Tonight" playing over the end credits. The IMAX and DVD releases added another song, "The Morning Report", based on a song discarded during development that eventually featured in the live musical version of The Lion King. The score was composed by Hans Zimmer, who was hired based on his earlier work on two films in African settings, A World Apart (1988) and The Power of One (1992), and supplemented the score with traditional native African music and choir elements arranged by Lebo M. Zimmer said while uninterested at first due to a dislike of Broadway musicals, accepted the job to have a work he could watch with his daughter, and given he also lost his father as a child, used that as inspiration for the music regarding Mufasa's death. Zimmer's partners Mark Mancina and Jay Rifkin helped with arrangements and song production.

Jason Weaver recorded his song vocals as young Simba for "I Just Can't Wait to be King," "Hakuna Matata," and an unused song, 'Warthog Rhapsody," the day he came in for what was supposed to be an audition. His mother turned down Disney's initial financial offer and negotiated a fee of $100,000 plus royalties.

The Lion King original motion picture soundtrack was released by Walt Disney Records on April 27, 1994. It was the fourth-best-selling album of the year on the Billboard 200 and the top-selling soundtrack. It is the only soundtrack to an animated film to be certified Diamond (10× platinum) by the Recording Industry Association of America. Zimmer's complete instrumental score for the film was never originally given a full release, until the soundtrack's commemorative twentieth anniversary re-release in 2014. The Lion King also inspired the 1995 release Rhythm of the Pride Lands, with eight songs by Zimmer, Mancina, and Lebo M.

The use of the song "The Lion Sleeps Tonight" in a scene with Timon and Pumbaa led to disputes between Disney and the family of South African Solomon Linda, who composed the song (originally titled "Mbube") in 1939. In July 2004, Linda's family filed a lawsuit, seeking $1.6 million in royalties from Disney. In February 2006, Linda's heirs reached a settlement with Abilene Music, who held the worldwide rights and had licensed the song to Disney for an undisclosed amount of money.

== Marketing ==
For The Lion King's first film trailer, Disney opted to feature a single scene, the entire opening sequence with the song "Circle of Life". Buena Vista Pictures Distribution president Dick Cook said the decision was made for such an approach because "we were all so taken by the beauty and majesty of this piece that we felt like it was probably one of the best four minutes of film that we've seen", and Don Hahn added that "Circle of Life" worked as a trailer as it "came off so strong, and so good, and ended with such a bang". The trailer was released in November 1993, accompanying The Three Musketeers (1993) and Sister Act 2: Back in the Habit (1993) in theaters; by then, only a third of The Lion King had been completed. Audience reaction was enthusiastic, causing Hahn to have some initial concerns as he became afraid of not living up to the expectations raised by the preview. Prior to the film's release, Disney did 11 test screenings.

Upon release, The Lion King was accompanied by an extensive marketing campaign which included tie-ins with Burger King, Mattel, Kodak, Nestlé, and Payless ShoeSource, and various merchandise, accounting 186 licensed products. In 1994, Disney earned approximately $1 billion with products based on the film, with $214 million for Lion King toys during Christmas 1994 alone.

In a 2024 retrospective, the New York Times noted that the marketing and promotion of the film heavily focused on Jonathan Taylor Thomas' role in the film, with a lot less emphasis on Jason Weaver's role as young Simba's singing voice.

== Release ==
=== Theatrical ===
The Lion King had a limited release in the United States on June 15, 1994, playing in only two theaters, El Capitan Theatre in Los Angeles and Radio City Music Hall in New York City, and featuring live shows with ticket prices up to $30.

The wide release in the United States and Canada followed on June 24, 1994, in 2,550 screens. The digital surround sound of the film led many of those theaters to implement Dolby Laboratories' newest sound systems. The film also started its international release on June 24, opening in Latin America, South Africa and Israel.

=== Localization ===
When first released in 1994, The Lion King numbered 28 versions overall in as many languages and dialects worldwide, including a special Zulu version made specifically for the film in South Africa, where a Disney USA team went to find the Zulu voice-actors. This was the first Zulu dubbing made by Disney, and also the only one made in any African language other than Arabic. The Zulu language version was released in South Africa on June 24, 1994.

Following the success of the 2017 Māori dub of Moana, a Māori version of The Lion King was announced in 2021, and released theatrically on June 23, 2022, to align with the Māori holiday of Matariki. Much of the Matewa Media production team, including producer Chelsea Winstanley, director Tweedie Waititi, and co-musical director Rob Ruha had previously worked on the Māori language version of Moana. The Lion King Reo Māori is the first time a language adaptation has translated Elton John's "Can You Feel the Love Tonight" for the ending credits.

=== Re-releases ===
==== IMAX and large-format ====
The film was re-issued on December 25, 2002, for IMAX and large-format theaters. Don Hahn explained that eight years after The Lion King had its original release, "there was a whole new generation of kids who haven't really seen it, particularly on the big screen." Given the film had already been digitally archived during production, the restoration process was easier, while also providing many scenes with enhancements that covered up original deficiencies. An enhanced sound mix was also provided to, as Hahn explained, "make the audience feel like they're in the middle of the movie." On its first weekend, The Lion King made $2.7 million from 66 locations, a $27,664 per theater average. This run ended with $15.7 million on May 30, 2003.

==== 3D conversion ====
In 2011, The Lion King was converted to 3D for a two-week limited theatrical re-issue and subsequent 3D Blu-ray release. The film opened at the number one spot on Friday, September 16, 2011, with $8.9 million and finished the weekend with $30.2 million, ranking number one at the box office. This made The Lion King the first re-issue release to earn the number-one slot at the American weekend box office since the re-issue of Return of the Jedi (1983) in March 1997. The film also achieved the fourth-highest September opening weekend of all time. It held off very well on its second weekend, again earning first place at the box office with a 27 percent decline to $21.9 million. Most box-office observers had expected the film to fall about 50 percent in its second weekend and were also expecting Moneyball (2011) to be at first place.

After its initial box-office success, many theaters decided to continue to show the film for more than two weeks, even though its 3D Blu-ray release was scheduled for two and a half weeks after its theatrical release. In North America, the 3D re-release ended its run in theaters on January 12, 2012, with a gross of $94.2 million. Outside North America, it earned $83.4 million. The successful 3D re-release of The Lion King made Disney and Pixar plan 3D theatrical re-releases of Beauty and the Beast, Finding Nemo (2003), Monsters, Inc. (2001), and The Little Mermaid (1989) during 2012 and 2013. However, none of the re-releases of the first three films achieved the enormous success of The Lion King 3D and the theatrical re-release of The Little Mermaid was ultimately cancelled. In 2012, Ray Subers of Box Office Mojo wrote that the reason why the 3D version of The Lion King succeeded was because, "the notion of a 3D re-release was still fresh and exciting, and The Lion King (3D) felt timely given the movie's imminent Blu-ray release. Audiences have been hit with three 3D re-releases in the year since, meaning the novelty value has definitely worn off."

==== Disney 100 ====
As part of Disney's 100th anniversary, The Lion King was re-released between September 29 to October 12, 2023, in selected Cinemark theaters across the United States as well as Helios theaters across Poland on October 8.

==== 30th anniversary ====
In conjunction with the film's 30th anniversary, The Lion King was re-released on July 12, 2024. During its opening weekend, the film earned an estimated $1.08 million in the United States from 1,330 theaters.

=== Home media ===
The Lion King was first released on VHS and LaserDisc in the United States on March 3, 1995, under Disney's "Masterpiece Collection" video series. The VHS edition of this release contained a special preview for Walt Disney Pictures' then-upcoming animated feature film Pocahontas (1995), in which the title character (voiced by Judy Kuhn) sings the musical number "Colors of the Wind". In addition, Deluxe Editions of both formats were released. The VHS Deluxe Edition included the film, an exclusive lithograph of Rafiki and Simba (in some editions), a commemorative "Circle of Life" epigraph, six concept art lithographs, another tape with the half-hour TV special The Making of The Lion King, and a certificate of authenticity. The CAV LaserDisc Deluxe Edition also contained the film, six concept art lithographs and The Making of The Lion King, and added storyboards, character design artwork, concept art, rough animation, and a directors' commentary that the VHS edition did not have, on a total of four double sided discs. The VHS tape quickly became the best-selling videotape of all time: 4.5 million tapes were sold on the first day and ultimately sales totaled more than 30 million before these home video versions went into moratorium in 1997. The VHS releases have sold a total of 32 million units in North America, and grossed $520 million in sales revenue. In addition, 23 million units were shipped overseas to international markets. In the Philippines, the film was released on VHS in March 1995 by Magnavision. The film sold more than 55 million video copies worldwide by August 1997, making it the best-selling home video title of all time.

On October 7, 2003, the film was re-released on VHS and released on DVD for the first time, titled The Lion King: Platinum Edition, as part of Disney's Platinum Edition line of DVDs. The DVD release featured two versions of the film on the first disc, a remastered version created for the 2002 IMAX release and an edited version of the IMAX release purporting to be the original 1994 theatrical version. A second disc, with bonus features, was also included in the DVD release. The film's soundtrack was provided both in its original Dolby 5.1 track and in a new Disney Enhanced Home Theater Mix, making this one of the first Disney DVDs so equipped. This THX certified two-disc DVD release also contains several games, Timon and Pumbaa's Virtual Safari, deleted scenes, music videos and other bonus features. By means of seamless branching, the film could be viewed either with or without a newly created scene – a short conversation in the film replaced with a complete song ("The Morning Report"). A Special Collector's Gift Set was also released, containing the DVD set, five exclusive lithographed character portraits (new sketches created and signed by the original character animators), and an introductory book entitled The Journey. The Platinum Edition of The Lion King featured changes made to the film during its IMAX re-release, including re-drawn crocodiles in the "I Just Can't Wait to Be King" sequence as well as other alterations. More than two million copies of the Platinum Edition DVD and VHS units were sold on the first day of release. A DVD box set of the three The Lion King films (in two-disc Special Edition formats) was released on December 6, 2004. In January 2005, the film, along with the sequels, went back into moratorium. The DVD releases have sold a total of 11.9 million units and grossed $220 million.

Walt Disney Studios Home Entertainment released the Diamond Edition of The Lion King on October 4, 2011. This marks the first time that the film has been released in high-definition Blu-ray and on Blu-ray 3D. The initial release was produced in three different packages: a two-disc version with Blu-ray and DVD; a four-disc version with Blu-ray, DVD, Blu-ray 3D, and digital copy; and an eight-disc box set that also includes the sequels The Lion King II: Simba's Pride and The Lion King 1½. A standalone single-disc DVD release also followed on November 15, 2011. The Diamond Edition topped the Blu-ray charts with over 1.5 million copies sold. The film sold 3.83 million Blu-ray units in total, leading to a $101.14 million income.

The Lion King was once again released to home media as part of the Walt Disney Signature Collection first released on Digital HD on August 15, 2017, and on Blu-ray and DVD on August 29, 2017.

The Lion King was released on Ultra HD Blu-ray and 4K digital download on December 3, 2018.

== Reception ==
=== Box office ===
The Lion King has grossed $425 million in North America and $554 million in other territories, for a worldwide total of $979 million. After its initial run, having earned $763.5 million, it ranked as the highest-grossing animated film of all time, the highest-grossing film of Walt Disney Animation Studios, and the highest-grossing film of 1994. It was the second-highest-grossing film of all time, behind Jurassic Park (1993). The film remained as the second-highest-grossing film until the spot was taken by Independence Day (1996) two years later. It finished as the 5th highest grossing film of the 1990s domestically.

It held the record for the highest-grossing animated feature film (in North America, outside North America, and worldwide) until it was surpassed by Finding Nemo (2003). With the earnings of the 3D run, The Lion King surpassed all the aforementioned films but Toy Story 3 (2010) to rank as the second-highest-grossing animated film worldwide—later dropping to ninth, and then tenth, surpassed by its photorealistic CGI remake counterpart—and it remains the highest-grossing hand-drawn animated film. It is also the biggest animated movie of the last 50 years in terms of estimated attendance. The Lion King was also the highest-grossing G-rated film in the United States from 1994 to 2003 and again from 2011 to 2019 until its total was surpassed by Toy Story 4 (2019) (unadjusted for inflation).

==== Original theatrical run ====
During the first two days of limited release in two theaters, The Lion King grossed $622,277, and for the weekend it earned nearly $1.6 million, placing the film in tenth place at the box office. The average of $793,377 per theater stands as the largest ever achieved during a weekend, and it was the highest-grossing opening weekend on under 50 screens, beating the record set by Star Wars (1977) from 43 screens. The film grossed nearly $3.8 million from the two theaters in just 10 days.

When it opened wide, The Lion King grossed $40.9 million—which at the time was the third-highest opening weekend ever, trailing only behind Jurassic Park (1993) and Batman Returns (1992), as well as the highest sum for a Disney film—to top the weekend box office. It displaced the previous box office champion Wolf, while also topping Speed and Wyatt Earp. At that time, it easily outgrossed the previous biggest 1994 opening, which was the $37.2 million earned by The Flintstones during the four-day Memorial Day weekend. For five years, the film held the record for having the highest opening weekend for an animated film until it was surpassed by Toy Story 2 (1999). For its second weekend, The Lion King collected a total of $34.2 million, outgrossing the openings of The Shadow, Blown Away and I Love Trouble. It remained the number-one box office film for a total of two weeks until it was displaced by Forrest Gump, followed by True Lies the week after.

In September 1994, Disney pulled the film from movie theaters and announced that it would be re-released during Thanksgiving to take advantage of the holiday season. At the time, the film had earned $267 million in the United States. Upon its re-release in November 1994, it earned $5.5 million during its first weekend, ranking in fourth place behind Star Trek Generations, Interview with the Vampire and The Santa Clause. Following its re-release, by March 1995, it had grossed $312.9 million, being the highest-grossing 1994 film in the United States and Canada, but was soon surpassed by Forrest Gump. Box Office Mojo estimates that the film sold over 74 million tickets in the US in its initial theatrical run, equivalent to $812.1 million adjusted for inflation in 2018.

Internationally, the film grossed $455.8 million during its initial run, for a worldwide total of $763.5 million. It had record openings in Sweden and Denmark.

=== Critical response ===
The Lion King was widely praised by film critics upon release. On Rotten Tomatoes, The Lion King has an approval rating of 92% with an average score of 8.5/10, based on 172 reviews. The website's critical consensus reads, "Emotionally stirring, richly drawn, and beautifully animated, The Lion King stands tall within Disney's pantheon of classic family films." It also ranked 56th on Rotten Tomatoes' "Top 100 Animation Movies". At Metacritic, which uses a weighted average, the film received a score of 88 out of 100 based on 30 critics, indicating "universal acclaim". Audiences polled by CinemaScore gave the film a rare "A+" grade on an A+ to F scale.

Roger Ebert of the Chicago Sun-Times gave the film three and a half stars out of a possible four and called it "a superbly drawn animated feature". He further wrote in his print review, "The saga of Simba, which in its deeply buried origins owes something to Greek tragedy and certainly to Hamlet, is a learning experience as well as an entertainment." On the television program Siskel & Ebert, the film was praised but received a mixed reaction when compared to previous Disney films. Ebert and his partner Gene Siskel both gave the film a "Thumbs Up", but Siskel said that it was not as good as Beauty and the Beast and that it was "a good film, not a great one". Hal Hinson of The Washington Post called it "an impressive, almost daunting achievement" and felt that the film was "spectacular in a manner that has nearly become commonplace with Disney's feature-length animations". However, he was less enthusiastic toward the end of his review saying, "Shakespearean in tone, epic in scope, it seems more appropriate for grown-ups than for kids. If truth be told, even for adults it is downright strange."

Jeremy Gerard of Variety opened his review, writing, "Set off by some of the richest imagery the studio's animators have produced, and held together by a timeless coming-of-age tale, The Lion King marks a dazzling — and unexpectedly daring — addition to the Disney canon." However, he felt the songs were not as memorable as those composed by Howard Ashman and Alan Menken. Janet Maslin of The New York Times felt The Lion King "is as visually enchanting as its pedigree suggests. But it also departs from the spontaneity of its predecessors and reveals more calculation." Duane Byrge of The Hollywood Reporter called The Lion King "a scrumptiously delightful moviegoing experience", in which he praised the voice cast, the music, and the emotionally resonant storyline.

Owen Gleiberman of Entertainment Weekly praised the film, writing that it "has the resonance to stand not just as a terrific cartoon but as an emotionally pungent movie". Rolling Stone film critic Peter Travers praised the film and felt that it was "a hugely entertaining blend of music, fun, and eye-popping thrills, though it doesn't lack for heart". James Berardinelli from Reelviews.net praised the film saying, "With each new animated release, Disney seems to be expanding its already-broad horizons a little more. The Lion King is the most mature (in more than one sense) of these films, and there clearly has been a conscious effort to please adults as much as children. Happily, for those of us who generally stay far away from 'cartoons', they have succeeded."

Some reviewers were critical of the film's narrative. Kenneth Turan of the Los Angeles Times felt the film "is less of a piece than its revered predecessors and the first to have a core story noticeably less involving than its scintillating peripheral characters." Maslin felt the storyline has "more noticeably derivative moments", which she attributed to the film having "an original story" than previous Disney animated films. TV Guide wrote that while The Lion King was technically proficient and entertaining, it "offers a less memorable song score than did the previous hits, and a hasty, unsatisfying dramatic resolution." The New Yorker's Terrence Rafferty considered that despite the good animation, the story felt like "manipulat[ing] our responses at will", as "Between traumas, the movie serves up soothingly banal musical numbers and silly, rambunctious comedy".

=== Accolades ===
List of awards and nominations
Award	Category	Nominee(s)	Result	Ref.
Academy Awards	Best Original Score	Hans Zimmer	Won	
Academy Awards	Best Original Song	"Can You Feel the Love Tonight"; Music by Elton John; Lyrics by Tim Rice	Won	
Academy Awards	Best Original Song	"Circle of Life"; Music by Elton John; Lyrics by Tim Rice	Nominated	
Academy Awards	Best Original Song	"Hakuna Matata"; Music by Elton John; Lyrics by Tim Rice	Nominated	
American Music Awards	Top Soundtrack	The Lion King: Original Motion Picture Soundtrack	Won	
Annie Awards	Best Animated Feature		Won	
Annie Awards	Best Achievement in Story Contribution	Brenda Chapman (Head of Story)	Won	
Annie Awards	Best Achievement in Production Design	Mark Henn (Supervising Animator for "Young Simba")	Nominated	
Annie Awards	Best Achievement in Production Design	Scott F. Johnston (Artistic Supervisor – Computer Graphics)	Nominated	
Annie Awards	Best Achievement in Production Design	Andy Gaskill (Art Director)	Nominated	
Annie Awards	Best Achievement in Voice Acting	Jeremy Irons	Won	
Artios Awards	Animated Voice-Over Casting	Brian Chavanne	Won	
ASCAP Film and Television Music Awards	Top Box Office Films	Hans Zimmer	Won	
ASCAP Film and Television Music Awards	Most Performed Song from Motion Pictures	"Can You Feel the Love Tonight"; Music by Elton John; Lyrics by Tim Rice	Won	
BAFTA Interactive Awards	DVD		Won	
British Academy Film Awards	Best Original Film Music	Hans Zimmer	Nominated	
British Academy Film Awards	Best Sound	Terry Porter, Mel Metcalfe, David J. Hudson, and Doc Kane	Nominated	
Chicago Film Critics Association Awards	Best Original Score	Hans Zimmer	Won	
Cinema Audio Society Awards	Outstanding Achievement in Sound Mixing for Motion Pictures	Terry Porter, Mel Metcalfe, David J. Hudson, and Doc Kane	Nominated	
Dallas–Fort Worth Film Critics Association Awards	Best Film		Nominated	
Dallas–Fort Worth Film Critics Association Awards	Best Animated Film		Won	
Golden Globe Awards	Best Motion Picture – Musical or Comedy		Won	
Golden Globe Awards	Best Original Score – Motion Picture	Hans Zimmer	Won	
Golden Globe Awards	Best Original Song – Motion Picture	"Can You Feel the Love Tonight"; Music by Elton John; Lyrics by Tim Rice	Won	
Golden Globe Awards	Best Original Song – Motion Picture	"Circle of Life"; Music by Elton John; Lyrics by Tim Rice	Nominated	
Golden Reel Awards	Best Sound Editing – Animated Feature	Richard L. Anderson, Vince Caro, Doc Kane, and Mark A. Mangini	Won	
Golden Reel Awards	Best Sound Editing – Music	Dominick Certo and Adam Milo Smalley	Won	
Grammy Awards	Song of the Year	"Can You Feel the Love Tonight" – Elton John and Tim Rice	Nominated	
Grammy Awards	Song of the Year	"Circle of Life" – Elton John and Tim Rice	Nominated	
Grammy Awards	Best Male Pop Vocal Performance	"Can You Feel the Love Tonight" – Elton John	Won	
Grammy Awards	Best Musical Album for Children	The Lion King: Original Motion Picture Soundtrack – Various Artists	Won	
Grammy Awards	Best Spoken Word Album for Children	The Lion King Read-Along – Robert Guillaume	Won	
Grammy Awards	Best Instrumental Arrangement with Accompanying Vocals	"Circle of Life" – Hans Zimmer and Lebo Morake	Won	
Grammy Awards	Best Instrumental Composition Written for a Motion Picture or for Television	The Lion King – Hans Zimmer	Nominated	
Grammy Awards	Best Song Written Specifically for a Motion Picture or for Television	"Can You Feel the Love Tonight" – Elton John and Tim Rice	Nominated	
Grammy Awards	Best Song Written Specifically for a Motion Picture or for Television	"Circle of Life" – Elton John and Tim Rice	Nominated	
International Film Music Critics Association Awards	Best Archival Release of an Existing Score – Re-Release or Re-Recording	Hans Zimmer, Elton John, Tim Rice, Randy Thornton, Lorelay Bové, and Don Hahn	Nominated	
Kansas City Film Critics Circle Awards	Best Animated Film		Won	
Los Angeles Film Critics Association Awards	Best Animation	Roger Allers and Rob Minkoff	Won	
MTV Movie Awards	Best Villain	Jeremy Irons	Nominated	
MTV Movie Awards	Best Song from a Movie	Elton John – "Can You Feel the Love Tonight"	Nominated	
National Film Preservation Board	National Film Registry		Inducted	
Nickelodeon Kids' Choice Awards	Favorite Movie		Won	
Online Film & Television Association Awards	Film Hall of Fame: Productions		Inducted	
Online Film & Television Association Awards	Film Hall of Fame: Songs	"Circle of Life"	Inducted	
Satellite Awards (2003)	Outstanding Youth DVD		Won	
Satellite Awards (2011)	Outstanding Youth DVD		Won	
Saturn Awards (1994)	Best Fantasy Film		Nominated	
Saturn Awards (1994)	Best Performance by a Younger Actor	Jonathan Taylor Thomas	Nominated	
Saturn Awards (2003)	Best Classic Film DVD Release		Nominated	
Turkish Film Critics Association Awards	Best Foreign Film		16th Place	
Young Artist Awards	Best Family Motion Picture – Comedy or Musical		Won	
Young Artist Awards	Best Performance by a Youth Actor in a Voice-Over – TV or Movie	Jonathan Taylor Thomas	Nominated	
Young Artist Awards	Best Performance by a Youth Actor in a Voice-Over – TV or Movie	Jason Weaver	Won	
Young Artist Awards	Best Performance by a Youth Actress in a Voice-Over – TV or Movie	Laura Williams	Won	

==== Other honors ====
In 2008, The Lion King was ranked as the 319th greatest film ever made by Empire magazine, and in June 2011, TIME named it one of "The 25 All-TIME Best Animated Films". In June 2008, the American Film Institute listed The Lion King as the fourth best film in the animation genre in its AFI's 10 Top 10 list, having previously put "Hakuna Matata" as 99th on its AFI's 100 Years...100 Songs ranking. The film was ranked 66th in a Hollywood Reporter ranking of "Hollywood's Top 100 Movies of All Time" and the film ranked 86th in a BBC ranking of the "100 greatest American films."

In 2016, the film was selected for preservation in the United States National Film Registry by the Library of Congress as being "culturally, historically, or aesthetically significant".

==== Year-end lists ====
- 2nd – Douglas Armstrong, The Milwaukee Journal
- 5th – Sandi Davis, The Oklahoman
- 5th – Todd Anthony, Miami New Times
- 6th – Stephen Hunter, The Baltimore Sun
- 6th – Christopher Sheid, The Munster Times
- 7th – Joan Vadeboncoeur, Syracuse Herald American
- 7th – Dan Craft, The Pantagraph
- 8th – Steve Persall, St. Petersburg Times
- 8th – Desson Howe, The Washington Post
- 10th – Mack Bates, The Milwaukee Journal
- 10th – David Elliott, The San Diego Union-Tribune
- Top 7 (not ranked) – Duane Dudek, Milwaukee Sentinel
- Top 9 (not ranked) – Dan Webster, The Spokesman-Review
- Top 10 (listed alphabetically, not ranked) – Matt Zoller Seitz, Dallas Observer
- Top 10 (listed alphabetically, not ranked) – William Arnold, Seattle Post-Intelligencer
- Top 10 (listed alphabetically, not ranked) – Mike Mayo, The Roanoke Times
- Top 10 (not ranked) – Bob Carlton, The Birmingham News
- "The second 10" (not ranked) – Sean P. Means, The Salt Lake Tribune
- Honorable mention – Michael MacCambridge, Austin American-Statesman
- Honorable mention – Dennis King, Tulsa World
- Honorable mention – Glenn Lovell, San Jose Mercury News
- Honorable mention – John Hurley, Staten Island Advance
- Honorable mention – Jeff Simon, The Buffalo News

=== Criticisms ===
The alleged "SEX" frame

Protests were raised against one scene where it appears as if the word "SEX" might have been embedded into the dust flying in the sky when Simba flops down, which conservative activist Donald Wildmon asserted was a subliminal message intended to promote sexual promiscuity. Animator and story artist Tom Sito has stated that the letters spell "SFX" (a common abbreviation for "special effects"), not with an "E" instead of the "F", and were intended as an innocent "signature" created by the effects animation team.

Hyena biologists protested against the animal's portrayal, though the complaints may have been somewhat tongue-in-cheek. One hyena researcher, who had organized the animators' visit to the University of California, Berkeley, Field Station for the Study of Behavior, Ecology, and Reproduction, where they would observe and sketch captive hyenas, listed "boycott The Lion King" in an article listing ways to help preserve hyenas in the wild, and later "joke[d] that The Lion King set back hyena conservation efforts." Even so, the film was also credited with "spark[ing] an interest" in hyenas at the Berkeley center.

The film has been criticized for race and class issues, with the hyenas seen as reflecting negative stereotypes of Black and Latino ethnic communities. Others have also criticized the film for advancing a fascist narrative in its portrayal of a lion kingdom and a circle of life where "only the strong and the beautiful triumph, and the powerless survive only by serving the strong."

==== Resemblance to Kimba the White Lion ====
Screenshot from an early presentation reel of The Lion King that shows a white lion cub and a butterfly.

Elements of The Lion King bear some superficial resemblance to the 1960s Japanese anime television series Jungle Emperor (known as Kimba the White Lion in the United States). The 1994 release of The Lion King drew a protest in Japan, where Kimba and its creator, Osamu Tezuka, are cultural icons. 488 Japanese cartoonists and animators, led by the manga author Machiko Satonaka, signed a petition accusing Disney of plagiarism and demanding that they give due credit to Tezuka. Broderick believed initially that he was working on an American version of Kimba.

Allers said he was unfamiliar with Kimba until The Lion King was almost complete, and did not remember it being mentioned during development. The law professor Madhavi Sunder suggested that Allers might have seen the 1989 remake of Kimba on television while living in Tokyo. However, while Allers did move to Tokyo in 1983 to work on Little Nemo: Adventures in Slumberland (1989), he moved back to the United States in 1985, four years before the 1989 remake of Kimba began airing. Minkoff also said he was unfamiliar with Kimba, and observed that stories set in Africa often have characters such as baboons, birds and hyenas.

Takayuki Matsutani, the president of Tezuka Productions, which created Kimba the White Lion, said in 1994 that "quite a few staff of our company saw a preview of The Lion King, discussed this subject and came to the conclusion that you cannot avoid having these similarities as long as you use animals as characters and try to draw images out of them". Yoshihiro Shimizu of Tezuka Productions refuted rumors that the studio was paid hush money by Disney and said they had no interest in suing Disney, explaining that "we think it's a totally different story". Shimizu said that they rejected urges from some American lawyers to sue because "we're a small, weak company... Disney's lawyers are among the top twenty in the world!" Tezuka's family and Tezuka Productions never pursued litigation.

The American writer Fred Ladd, who was involved with importing Kimba and other Japanese anime into America for NBC, expressed incredulity that Disney staff could be ignorant of Kimba. Ladd said at least one animator was remembered by his colleagues as a Kimba fan and vociferous about Disney's conduct during production. The animators Tom Sito and Mark Kausler said they had watched Kimba as children in the 1960s, but Sito denied any influence, and Kausler emphasized Disney's Bambi as their model. The controversy was parodied in The Simpsons episode "'Round Springfield", in which Mufasa appears through the clouds and says, "You must avenge my death, Kimba... I mean, Simba."

== Legacy ==
=== Sequels and spin-offs ===
The first Lion King–related animated project was the spin-off television series, The Lion King's Timon & Pumbaa, which centers on the characters of Timon and Pumbaa, as they have their own (mis)adventures both within' and outside of the Serengeti. The show ran for three seasons and 85 episodes between 1995 and 1999. Ernie Sabella continued to voice Pumbaa, while Timon was voiced by Quinton Flynn and Kevin Schon in addition to Nathan Lane. One of the show's music video segments "Stand By Me", featuring Timon singing the eponymous song, was later edited into an animated short which was released in 1995, accompanying the theatrical release of Tom and Huck (1995).

Disney released two direct-to-video films related to The Lion King. The first was sequel The Lion King II: Simba's Pride, released in 1998 on VHS. The film centers around Simba and Nala's daughter, Kiara, who falls in love with Kovu, a male lion who was raised in a pride of Scar's followers, the Outsiders. The Lion King 1½, another direct-to-video Lion King film, saw its release in 2004. It is a prequel in showing how Timon and Pumbaa met each other, and also a parallel in that it also depicts what the characters were retconned to have done during the events of the original movie.

In June 2014, it was announced that a new television series based on the film would be released called The Lion Guard, featuring Kion, the second-born cub of Simba and Nala. The Lion Guard is a sequel to The Lion King and takes place during the time-gap within The Lion King II: Simba's Pride, with the last 2 episodes of Season 3 taking place after the events of that film. It was first broadcast on Disney Channel as a television film titled The Lion Guard: Return of the Roar in November 2015 before airing as a series on Disney Junior in January 2016.

=== CGI remake ===
In September 2016, following the critical and financial success of The Jungle Book, Walt Disney Pictures announced that they were developing a CGI remake of The Lion King by the same name, with Jon Favreau directing. The following month, Jeff Nathanson was hired to write the script for the film. Favreau originally planned to shoot it back-to-back with the sequel to The Jungle Book. However, it was reported in early 2017 that the latter film was put on hold in order for Favreau to instead focus mainly on The Lion King. In February 2017, Favreau announced that Donald Glover had been cast as Simba and that James Earl Jones would be reprising the role of Mufasa. The following month, it was reported that Beyoncé was Favreau's top choice to voice Nala, but she had not accepted the role yet due to a pregnancy. In April 2017, Billy Eichner and Seth Rogen joined the film as Timon and Pumbaa, respectively. Two months later, John Oliver was cast as Zazu. At the end of July 2017, Beyoncé had reportedly entered final negotiations to play Nala and contribute a new soundtrack. The following month, Chiwetel Ejiofor entered talks to play Scar. Later on, Alfre Woodard and John Kani joined the film as Sarabi and Rafiki, respectively. On November 1, 2017, Beyoncé and Chiwetel Ejiofor were officially confirmed to voice Nala and Scar, with Eric André, Florence Kasumba, Keegan-Michael Key, JD McCrary, and Shahadi Wright Joseph joining the cast as the voices of Azizi, Shenzi, and Kamari, young Simba, and young Nala, respectively, while Hans Zimmer would return to score the film's music. On November 28, 2017, it was reported that Elton John had signed onto the project to rework his musical compositions from the original film.

Production for the film began in May 2017. It was released on July 19, 2019.

=== Black Is King ===
In June 2020, Parkwood Entertainment and Disney announced that a film titled Black Is King would be released on July 31, 2020, on Disney+. The live-action film was inspired by The Lion King (2019) and served as a visual album for the tie-in album The Lion King: The Gift, which was curated by Beyoncé for the film. Directed, written and executive produced by Beyoncé, Black Is King is described as reimagining "the lessons of The Lion King for today's young kings and queens in search of their own crowns". The film chronicles the story of a young African king who undergoes a "transcendent journey through betrayal, love and self-identity" to reclaim his throne, utilizing the guidance of his ancestors and childhood love, with the story being told through the voices of present-day Black people. The cast included Lupita Nyong'o, Naomi Campbell, Jay-Z, Kelly Rowland, Pharrell Williams, Tina Knowles-Lawson, Aweng Ade-Chuol, and Adut Akech.

=== Mufasa: The Lion King ===
On September 29, 2020, Deadline Hollywood reported that a follow-up film was in development with Barry Jenkins attached to direct. While The Hollywood Reporter said the film would be a prequel about Mufasa during his formative years, Deadline said it would be a sequel centering on both Mufasa's origins and the events after the first film, similar to The Godfather Part II. Jeff Nathanson, the screenwriter for the remake, has reportedly finished a draft. In August 2021, it was reported that Aaron Pierre and Kelvin Harrison Jr. had been cast as Mufasa and Scar respectively. The film will not be a remake of The Lion King II: Simba's Pride, the 1998 direct-to-video sequel to the original animated film. In September 2022 at the D23 Expo, it was announced that the film will be titled Mufasa: The Lion King and it will follow the title character's origin story. Seth Rogen, Billy Eichner, and John Kani will reprise their roles as Pumbaa, Timon, and Rafiki, respectively. The film was released on December 20, 2024.

=== Video games ===
Along with the film release, three different video games based on The Lion King were released by Virgin Interactive in December 1994. The main title was developed by Westwood Studios, and published for PC and Amiga computers and the consoles SNES and Sega Mega Drive/Genesis. Dark Technologies created the Game Boy version, while Syrox Developments handled the Master System and Game Gear version. The film and sequel Simba's Pride later inspired another game, Torus Games' The Lion King: Simba's Mighty Adventure (2000) for the Game Boy Color and PlayStation. Timon and Pumbaa also appeared in Timon & Pumbaa's Jungle Games, a 1995 PC game collection of puzzle games by 7th Level, later ported to the SNES by Tiertex.

The Square Enix series Kingdom Hearts features Simba as a recurring summon, as well as a playable in the Lion King world, known as Pride Lands, in Kingdom Hearts II. There the plotline is loosely related to the later part of the original film, with all of the main characters except Zazu and Sarabi. The Lion King also provides one of the worlds featured in the 2011 action-adventure game Disney Universe, and Simba was featured in the Nintendo DS title Disney Friends (2008). The video game Disney Magic Kingdoms includes some characters of the film and some attractions based on locations of the film as content to unlock for a limited time.

=== Stage adaptations ===
Walt Disney Theatrical produced a musical stage adaptation of the same name, which premiered in Minneapolis, Minnesota in July 1997, and later opened on Broadway in October 1997 at the New Amsterdam Theatre. The Lion King musical was directed by Julie Taymor and featured songs from both the movie and Rhythm of the Pride Lands, along with three new compositions by Elton John and Tim Rice. Mark Mancina did the musical arrangements and new orchestral tracks. To celebrate the African culture background the story is based on, there are six indigenous African languages sung and spoken throughout the show: Swahili, Zulu, Xhosa, Sotho, Tswana, Congolese. The musical became one of the most successful in Broadway history, winning six Tony Awards including Best Musical, and despite moving to the Minskoff Theatre in 2006, is still running to this day in New York, becoming the third longest-running show and highest grossing Broadway production in history. The show's financial success led to adaptations all over the world.

The Lion King inspired two attractions retelling the story of the film at Walt Disney Parks and Resorts. The first, "The Legend of the Lion King", featured a recreation of the film through life-size puppets of its characters, and ran from 1994 to 2002 at Magic Kingdom in Walt Disney World. Another that is still running is the live-action 30-minute musical revue of the movie, "Festival of the Lion King", which incorporates the musical numbers into gymnastic routines with live actors, along with animatronic puppets of Simba and Pumbaa and a costumed actor as Timon. The attraction opened in April 1998 at Disney World's Animal Kingdom, and in September 2005 in Hong Kong Disneyland's Adventureland. A similar version under the name "The Legend of the Lion King" was featured in Disneyland Paris from 2004 to 2009.

== See also ==
- Cultural depictions of lions
- Atlantis: The Lost Empire and Nadia: The Secret of Blue Water controversy, a similar plagiarism controversy

== Bibliography ==
- Chandler, David (2018). "Creating The Lion King: Story development, authorship and accreditation in the Disney Renaissance". Journal of Screenwriting. 9 (3): 329–345. doi:10.1386/josc.9.3.329_1. S2CID 192049630.
- Finch, Christopher (1994). The Art of The Lion King. Hyperion. ISBN 978-0-7868-6028-9.
- Geirland, John; Keidar, Eva Sonesh (1999). Digital Babylon: How the Geeks, the Suits, and the Ponytails Fought to Bring Hollywood to the Internet. Arcade Publishing. ISBN 978-1-559-70483-0.
- Koenig, David (1997). "The Lion King". Mouse Under Glass: Secrets of Disney Animation & Theme Parks. Irvine, California: Bonaventure Press. pp. 227–232. ISBN 978-0-96406-051-7.
- Kroyer, Bill; Sito, Tom (2019). "Roger Allers Interview". In Diamond, Ron (ed.). On Animation: The Director's Perspective—Volume 1. CRC Press. pp. 255–292. ISBN 978-1-138-06653-3.
- Neuwirth, Allan (2003). Makin' Toons: Inside the Most Popular Animated TV Shows and Movies. Skyhorse Publishing. ISBN 978-1-58115-269-2.
- Stewart, James B. (2005). DisneyWar. New York: Simon & Schuster. ISBN 0-684-80993-1.
