= The Lion King: Simba's Mighty Adventure =

2000 video game

- Developers: Paradox Development (PS1); Torus Games (GBC)
- Publisher: Activision
- Series: The Lion King
- Platforms: PlayStation, Game Boy Color
- Release: NA: December 22, 2000 (PS1); NA: December 29, 2000 (GBC); EU: March 9, 2001
- Genre: Platform
- Mode: Single-player

The Lion King: Simba's Mighty Adventure is a 2000 platform game based on the 1994 animated film The Lion King. It was developed by Paradox Development for the PlayStation and by Torus Games for the Game Boy Color, and published by Activision. Unlike the previous The Lion King video game, it adhered more closely to the events in the film and the storyline carried on into the 1998 animated film The Lion King II: Simba's Pride, with Simba having to battle his evil uncle Scar, rescue his daughter Kiara (the protagonist from The Lion King II: Simba's Pride), and finally battle Zira.

This game was the only console-based platform game to involve The Lion King II: Simba's Pride. All other games based on the title were educational or puzzle games and were released on the PC.

== Gameplay ==
The game's gameplay varied between the two consoles.

=== Game Boy Color ===
The game is mostly a side-scrolling platform game with occasional levels where the camera is top-down. The gameplay is very similar to the first The Lion King video game, in which the player takes control of Simba and must leap and run between platforms while fighting enemies and avoiding pitfalls. During levels Simba can collect pawprint-shaped tokens which add to the overall score.

The game supports the Game Link Cable accessory.

=== PlayStation ===
Due to the PlayStation console's 3D graphics capabilities the gameplay became slightly more varied. Simba's capabilities are identical to the first The Lion King video game in which he can roar, leap, roll and run.

== Graphics and sound ==
=== Game Boy Color ===
In the Game Boy Color version of the game there was only one piece of music used on every level. Some of the animation for both adult Simba and cub Simba was recycled from the previous The Lion King video game.

=== PlayStation ===
In the PlayStation version, voices, music and sound effects from the film were used. Clips from the films are placed between levels although many of the lines were redubbed by other Lion King-related actors, including Cam Clarke, Jim Cummings, and Kevin Schon.

== Reception ==
Reception

Review scores
Publication	Score
4Players	68/100 (PS1)
AllGame	3/5 (PS1)
Gamekult	5/10 (GBC)
IGN	4.0/10 (PS1)
Jeuxvideo.com	16/20 (GBC); 11/20 (PS1)
Nintendo Power	4.5/5 (GBC)
Gamezilla	62/100 (PS1)

=== Game Boy Color ===
Nintendo Power gave a positive review, praising the level design but also pointing out that certain jumps may necessitate overly precise execution. Jeuxvideo.com liked the graphics and controls but called the music repetitive. Gamekult praised the graphics, animation, and the level design. They criticized the repetitive music and felt the game was too short.

=== PlayStation ===
IGN wrote: "The game's biggest problem is that the control is very sluggish and unresponsive [...]" Jeuxvideo.com expressed disappointment in the PlayStation version after the excellent Game Boy Color version. The graphics were deemed average and the controls awful. AllGame gave a positive review saying: "Nice graphics and good control are its strengths, while ordinary gameplay and some perspective problems are its drawbacks." Gamezilla summarized: "It isn't a terrible game to purchase, but you should probably buy it only if it is on sale". 4Players compared the game unfavorably to Crash Bandicoot and Rayman.
