= Nala (The Lion King) =

Fictional character from The Lion King

- The Lion King character
- Nala as she appears in Kingdom Hearts II.
- First appearance: The Lion King (1994)
- Created by: Irene Mecchi; Jonathan Roberts; Linda Woolverton
- Voiced by: Moira Kelly (adult, speaking; original film trilogy and Disney Dreamlight Valley); Sally Dworsky (adult, singing); Niketa Calame (cub, speaking); Laura Williams (cub, singing); Gabrielle Union (The Lion Guard); Beyoncé (adult; 2019 film and Mufasa: The Lion King); Shahadi Wright Joseph (cub; 2019 film); Chelsea Tavares (cub; The Lion King: Simba's Mighty Adventure); Ariel Alexandria Davis (cub; Disney's Extreme Skate Adventure); Vanessa Marshall (adult; Kingdom Hearts II)

In-universe information
- Species: Lioness
- Title: Queen of the Pride Lands
- Family: Sarafina (mother)
- Spouse: Simba
- Children: Kopa (son; in Six New Adventures); Kiara (daughter); Kion (son)
- Relatives: Mufasa (father-in-law); Sarabi (mother-in-law); Scar (uncle-in-law); Kovu (son-in-law); Rani (daughter-in-law); Ahadi (grandfather-in-law; in Six New Adventures); Uru (grandmother-in-law; in Six New Adventures); Mohatu (great-grandfather-in-law; in The Brightest Star)

Nala is a fictional character in Disney's The Lion King franchise. Introduced in The Lion King (1994), Nala subsequently appears as a less prominent character in The Lion King II: Simba's Pride (1998) and The Lion King 1½ (2004), and as a recurring character in The Lion Guard (2015–2019) television series. In the original animated film trilogy, the adult Nala is voiced by American actress Moira Kelly. Young Nala's speaking voice in the original film is provided by actress Niketa Calame, while singers Laura Williams and Sally Dworsky provide the singing voices of young and adult Nala respectively. Nala is introduced as the daughter of an unnamed lion and Sarafina, the best friend of Simba, and ultimately becomes his wife as well as the daughter-in-law of Mufasa and Sarabi and the niece-in-law of Scar by the end of The Lion King. Nala becomes Simba's wife as well as his Queen Consort. Nala is also the mother of Kiara and Kion, and in The Lion King: Six New Adventures, she is the mother of Kopa.

Several years after Simba's uncle Scar has killed Simba's father Mufasa and taken the throne, Nala desperately ventures into the jungle to find help. Upon unexpectedly reuniting with a young adult Simba, whom she had long since been tricked by Scar into presuming dead, Nala encourages him to return to Pride Rock, overthrow his uncle and ultimately become king. As Simba's queen, Nala has a son, Kopa, an adventurous cub in The Lion King: Six New Adventures, a daughter, Kiara, whose story is explored in The Lion King: Simba's Pride and another son named Kion, who serves as the protagonist of The Lion Guard.

Nala is the most significant female character in The Lion King. As the film was inspired by William Shakespeare's tragedy Hamlet, Nala is considered to be The Lion King's equivalent of Hamlet's love interest Ophelia, although differences remain between the two characters. Many early concepts first developed for Nala were eventually abandoned, including a brother and father for the character, as well as her being romantically pursued by Scar. While critical reception towards Nala has been generally mixed, Kelly's vocal performance has been praised.

Nala appears in the Broadway musical adaptation of the film, first played by singer Heather Headley. The character also appears in the television series, with Gabrielle Union replacing Kelly as the voice of Nala. Beyoncé and Shahadi Wright Joseph voice the character in the 2019 CGI live adaptation of the original film directed by Jon Favreau.

== Development ==
=== Conception and creation ===
Screenwriter Linda Woolverton conceived Nala "as part of a gradual progression ... which have driven recent public conversation about what young girls should be able to expect from their cinematic role models". In early versions of Woolverton's script, Nala has a younger brother named Mheetu, who enjoys joining her and her best friend Simba on their adventures. Pronounced "me too", the character's name references this specific personality trait. Simba was intended to save the cub from a wildebeest stampede, and Nala would eventually become responsible for protecting Mheetu from Simba's tyrannical uncle Scar. Nala also had a fox friend named Bhati. According to Woolverton, Mheetu and Bhati were written out of the film because their stories were beginning to distract from Simba's, in addition to the Mheetu-Scar subplot making the film too dark when combined with the death of Simba's father Mufasa. At one point, Nala also had a named father; the character was similarly abandoned. In addition, in another script, Sarafina (then named Naanda) was Sarabi's younger sister, and Mufasa was implied to be her mate, and thus Nala's Father. This implication was censored in the final draft as it would lead to incest between Simba and Nala as half siblings as well as first cousins.

Because The Lion King was originally conceived as a much more mature and adult-oriented film, Nala was intended to have been banished from the Pride Lands as punishment for rejecting Scar's romantic advances. This idea was to have been further explored in Scar's song "Be Prepared (Reprise)", during which Scar demands that Nala become his queen, but the musical number was ultimately cut from the final film because the scene was considered too "creepy". Matthew Roulette of TheFW believes that the scene was abandoned because of the significant age difference between Nala and Scar.

The character has a mother, whose name is never mentioned in the film; however, she is credited as Sarafina during the film's end credits. Asked at an anniversary event who Nala's father was after fan speculation, producers Rob Minkoff and Roger Allers suggested that they had "hoped nobody would notice," but that it would probably have to be Mufasa or Scar based on the behavior of real-life lions. Candice Russel of the Sun-Sentinel believes that Nala contributes to the film's love story – "an indispensable factor in Disney cartoon features" – in addition to convincing Simba to return to Pride Rock. It has been observed that, unlike Disney's three previous animated efforts (The Little Mermaid (1989), Beauty and the Beast (1991) and Aladdin (1992)), the romantic relationship between Nala and Simba is not main plot of the film. Ella Ceron of Thought Catalog observed that "At [Simba's] return, she's not exactly the friendliest little kitten, either ... but is willing to overlook her own hurt ego in the spirit of their friendship. She believes in Simba, and doesn't understand why he wouldn't want to fight for his right to rule."

=== Voice and music ===
The speaking voice of adult Nala is provided by American actress Moira Kelly, who had learned that Disney was auditioning actors for the role from her agent. Despite not being the directors' first choice, Kelly was granted an audition because the filmmakers were interested in hearing different voices at the time. Kelly believes the directors had been searching for an authoritative, warm voice to complement Nala's sensible yet nurturing personality. After attending a series of callbacks, Kelly was selected as one of two finalists. She was officially offered the part several months after her audition; Disney's first choice remains undisclosed. Actor Matthew Broderick, the voice of Simba, had already begun recording opposite a different actress who had been cast as Nala before she was replaced with Kelly. Broderick was not informed that his original co-star had been recast, and only learned that Nala was voiced by Kelly at the film's premiere.

The film's entire recording process was completed over approximately three years, during which Kelly's sessions were held in both the United States and Canada, while her co-stars Broderick and Jeremy Irons, voice of Scar, recorded in the United States and England, respectively. Each main cast member recorded their dialogue separately, which took Kelly some time to adjust to because she had grown accustomed to working with several other actors at a time on the sets of her live-action films. For The Lion King, a director would often take the place of another actor for Kelly to act opposite of. Vocally, Kelly decided to approach the role as though she were reading to a child, which she admitted is different than how the actress would approach a live-action role. Because Nala is a "very straight character", determining what kind of voice she would use for her was not a particularly challenging task. Additionally, the filmmakers would also film Kelly's performances in order to incorporate her own facial expressions into her character's design, the process of which impressed the actress. In her film debut, actress Niketa Calame voices young Nala. According to Calame's official website, Nala remains the actress' "biggest role to date".

A classically trained pianist and chorister, Laura Williams provides the singing voice of young Nala, which can be heard in the song "I Just Can't Wait to Be King"; the singer was 15 years old at the time. Meanwhile, singer-songwriter Sally Dworsky provides the singing voice of adult Nala, which is heard during the song "Can You Feel the Love Tonight". The lyrics of the film's love theme, "Can You Feel the Love Tonight", were re-written approximately 15 times, according to lyricist Tim Rice, who wrote the song alongside composer Elton John. At one point, the producers wanted the song to be a comical duet performed by supporting characters Timon and Pumbaa, despite the fact that John had originally composed the song with Nala and Simba in mind. However, John lobbied in favor of "Can You Feel the Love Tonight" being a love song performed as a duet by Nala and Simba, with which the filmmakers ultimately agreed.

When asked by Disney if she was interested in reprising her role as Nala in The Lion King II: Simba's Pride, Kelly immediately accepted, joking, "Sure, you wanna do a third, fourth, fifth? I'm right there". In the case of The Lion King 1½, it took the actress only a couple of days to record her character's dialogue due to Nala's comparatively smaller role in the film; much of Nala's footage from the first film was simply reused accordingly. Elton John's official website cites Kelly among the film's cast of actors who "would grace any red carpet." Kelly's performance as Nala is responsible for introducing the actress to a younger audience. Previously, she had been better known for appearing in more adult-oriented live-action films at that time. In 2011, Kelly revealed that fans of the film rarely recognize her speaking voice as the voice of Nala, although Robert DeSalvo of NextMovie.com claims that the actress "has a ... distinctive voice that The Lion King fans will instantly recognize as the voice of adult Nala." In 2023, Kelly reprised her voice role as Nala for the first time outside of the animated trilogy in Disney Dreamlight Valley.

== Characterization and themes ==
A straight woman character, Kelly described Nala as a sensible and nurturing yet authoritative character, while Amber Leab of Bitch Flicks described her as strong, independent and intelligent. Occupying the role of the film's female lead, Nala is The Lion King's most important female character, who contributes to the film's "small romance element". Often identified as the film's second most important character, Taylor Orci of The Atlantic felt that "Nala is really the agent of change in The Lion King", dismissing Simba as a "rich, lazy boyfriend." Leab observed that The Lion King's male characters tend to "take the center stage" while "female characters take a backseat to the action." Lenka Křivánková of Masaryk University wrote in her thesis "1990s Hollywood Break-Away Hits: A Feminist Perspective" that she was not particularly surprised by the film's lack of strong roles for women because of its Shakespearean source material, dubbing the film "an old traditional fairy tale with all its traditional features", including patriarchy and monarchism. Writing for the University of Waterloo's Kinema, Vicky Wong believes that Nala reinforces the film's "take your place" motif, reminding main character Simba of his responsibilities. In his book Retelling Stories, Framing Culture: Traditional Story and Metanarratives in Children's Literature, author John Stephens credits Nala with teaching Simba about responsibility – "the lesson the hero must learn before he can become an adult".

Film critic James Berardinelli identified Nala as The Lion King's "sole significant female character." Including Nala, The Lion King has only three major female characters in comparison to the film's total of nine male ones. Mouse Morality: The Rhetoric of Disney Animated Film author Annalee R. Ward wrote that Nala's role in The Lion King reflected "a 1990s feminist reversal". In her book Biblical Allusions, author Lindsay Bacher acknowledged that Nala is often depicted as a stronger and more responsible character than Simba, despite observations that The Lion King's female characters lack agency. Leab identified Nala as Simba's "equal" who is "a more naturally sound leader throughout the film, while Simba tends to be comparatively a bit more immature and in need of multiple characters propelling him into responsible/rightful action." Nala is also a more skilled fighter than Simba, proven by the character's ability to overwhelm him in battle, which is reminiscent "of the physical power of lionesses in the real nature." However, as strong as she is, Nala has little impact elsewhere; author Brian K. Pennington wrote in his book Teaching Religion and Violence that "Nala's assertions of gender equality are clearly groundless, since only a male lion can stop Scar." New York's David Denbey dismissed Nala's athleticism as nothing more than Disney's attempt to "disguise [the film's] essential boss-daddy ethos." Bacher believes that had The Lion King featured Nala as the Pride Lands' hero as opposed to Simba, the film could have avoided having a "patriarchal structure." Leab concluded that "the main and most problematic aspects of the film" remain that The Lion King "boils down to the fact that an entire group of strong female characters are unable to confront a single male oppressor; to do so, they need to be led by a dominant male." Leab continued, "It almost sucks more that Nala is such a strong ... female character and still ends up constrained by this plot device", accusing the film of depicting women as weak.

Alongside Faline from Bambi (1942) and Maid Marian from Robin Hood (1973) added, Nala belongs to a trio of Disney heroines who, after having been separated from their love interests for several years, eventually reunite with them. Stephens believes that Nala and Simba's separation allows the characters to fall in love "properly" upon reuniting as young adults. Because The Lion King is loosely based on William Shakespeare's tragedy Hamlet, Nala is considered to be the film's "representative" of the Hamlet character Ophelia, Hamlet's love interest. Both characters' relationships with and opinions of their love interests are similar, however, there are several differences between the two women. The Daily Californian's Miyako Singer argued that "Nala is no poor, tragic Ophelia", instead resembling a "fierce princess warrior" similar to the strong heroines Disney introduced during the 1990s. Unlike Ophelia, Nala does not succumb to insanity, nor does she eventually die. Instead, Nala establishes herself as a powerful ally by encouraging Simba to return to Pride Rock, and helping the character overthrow Scar. Additionally, Nala is a more stubborn character than Ophelia, the latter of whom is quite passive and obedient. While Ophelia is raised by a single father, Nala is raised solely by her mother, which inspired Allen to believe that Nala is a manifestation of how Ophelia would have turned out had she been raised by a woman instead of a man, concluding, "Nala is able to show the potential that Ophelia could have had.".

== Appearances ==
=== Film and television ===
A young Nala debuted in The Lion King (1994) as the daughter of Sarafina and the best friend of Simba, whom she is betrothed to and often accompanies with on his adventures throughout the Pride Lands. Simba invites Nala to visit the forbidden Elephant Graveyard with him, despite his father Mufasa's orders. The two cubs are soon ambushed by Shenzi, Banzai and Ed, a trio of spotted hyenas chosen by Simba's treacherous uncle Scar to kill Simba in order to improve his own chances of becoming king, but are ultimately rescued by Mufasa. The following day, however, Nala is devastated to learn from Scar that both Simba and Mufasa have perished during a wildebeest stampede. With both Simba and Mufasa dead, Scar usurps the throne and becomes king, allowing the hyenas into the Pride Lands. Several years into Scar's tyrannical rule, which has left the kingdom barren and starving, a desperate Nala ventures into the jungle oasis in search of help, where she attempts to eat a warthog named Pumbaa; little does she know that the warthog is actually a friend of Simba's, who is, in fact, alive and well. While defending Pumbaa from Nala, Simba recognizes Nala, and the two finally reunite only to argue over why Simba is refusing to face his responsibilities and return to Pride Rock. Upon learning that Simba has eventually decided to return to Pride Rock and face Scar, Nala travels back to the Pride Lands to assist him. Surprised to find Simba alive, Scar forces his guilt-ridden nephew to "admit" to the pride that he is responsible for Mufasa's death, which was in fact caused by Scar himself by throwing Mufasa off a cliff into the stampede. Upon learning the truth, Simba forces his uncle to admit his act to the pride, and a battle ensues between the pride and Scar's army of hyenas. Simba eventually defeats Scar and becomes king, with Nala ultimately becoming his queen.

Nala does not appear in the spin-off television series The Lion King's Timon & Pumbaa.

In the film's first direct-to-video sequel The Lion King II: Simba's Pride (1998), Nala appears in a less prominent role as Queen of the Pride Lands and mother of Kiara, the spirited daughter of her and Simba. Nala observes that Kiara, of whom Simba is very protective, has inherited her father's rebellious personality and love of adventure. When Kiara befriends Zira's son Kovu, a young lion from an exiled pride of Scar's followers known as the Outsiders, Nala is much more tolerant of their relationship than Simba, and convinces him to offer Kovu a chance to prove himself trustworthy. At the end of the film, Nala gains Kovu as her son-in-law after he marries Kiara. In The Lion King 1½ (2004), which focuses instead on Timon and Pumbaa's friendship, Nala's role is virtually identical to that of her appearance in The Lion King because filmmakers reused most of the character's footage from the first film.

Voiced by actress Gabrielle Union, Nala reprises her role as Queen of the Pride Lands in the television series The Lion Guard, the 2016 premiere of which was preceded by the made-for-television film The Lion Guard: Return of the Roar (2015). Set within the time gap in The Lion King II: Simba's Pride, the show revolves around Nala and Simba's son Kion who, being their second-born cub after Kiara, has been tasked with forming the next Lion Guard, a group responsible for protecting the Pride Lands. By the end of season 3, Nala also gains Rani as her daughter-in-law after she marries Kion, who is becoming the king of the Tree of Life and retired as the leader of the Lion Guard. Although a fan of the Lion King franchise, Union avoided watching previous Lion King films in preparation for the role because she wanted to "put [her] own stamp" on the character.

On November 1, 2017, it was confirmed that Beyoncé Knowles-Carter would voice adult Nala in Jon Favreau's The Lion King, which was released on July 19, 2019. Favreau felt that "part of [her joining the film] is that she's got young kids, part of it is that it's a story that feels good for this phase of her life and her career, and she really likes the original very much. And then, of course, there are these wonderful musical numbers that she can be involved with, and my God… she really lives up to her reputation as far as the beauty of her voice and talent". The same day Shahadi Wright Joseph was cast as young Nala in the film. Joseph reprises her role from the Broadway production. Joseph choose to work on the film because "[she knows] Nala inspires little girls because that happened to [her] when [she] was younger. [Joseph] literally said that [she] wanted to be her. She's a great role model". Joseph said that, upon learning that Beyoncé would be voicing the grown-up Nala, she "really had to step [her] game up and think about what Beyoncé would want". The film marks the comeback of the singer since her pregnancy and her first musical film since Dreamgirls in 2006.

Nala's role in the 2019 remake is slightly expanded. As a cub, Nala is portrayed as more wary and reluctant when venturing the Elephant Graveyard with Simba, sensing the danger lurking in the place. During Scar's reign, adult Nala develops a rivalry with Shenzi due to their first encounter. She also suggests to Sarabi that they should fight back or leave Pride Lands, but Sarabi turns down both suggestions. This leads Nala to sneak out of Pride Rock the following night so she can get help. Zazu uses himself as a diversion to allow Nala to leave without being caught by Scar and the hyenas. She reunites with Simba at the jungle like in the original but leaves immediately after Simba refuses to return, only for Simba to follow her soon after changing his mind. During the climax, Nala fights against Shenzi and emerges victorious. She then ends up becoming the Pride Lands’ new Queen by marries Simba and gave birth to a cub whom she and Simba named Kiara just like when Nala gave birth to an unnamed newborn female cub in the original film. In the 2024 prequel film Mufasa, Nala and Simba disappear to an oasis while Rafiki regales Kiara with her grandfather's origin story, only to return at the film's end and introduces Kiara to the newborn Kion.

=== Musical ===
In the Broadway musical adaptation of The Lion King, the role of Nala was originated by Trinidadian-American singer Heather Headley. Her Broadway debut, at first auditioning for the role proved a challenge for the singer due to her Ragtime contract, which her agent was eventually successful in getting her released from. Director Julie Taymor felt that Nala's journey in the film was underdeveloped and among the story's weaker elements, and thus decided to "strengthen" the character's narrative for Broadway.

Her role in the musical remains the same as the film except for a scene where during the song "The Madness of King Scar", Nala comes to Scar to urge him to do something about the drought in the Pride Lands, only for Scar to try and seduce her into becoming his queen and mother of his children. Nala refuses since she's already been betrothed to Simba, prince of the Pride Lands as an infant by their parents, Sarafina, Mufasa and Sarabi and flees the Pride Lands to find help.

== Reception ==
Critical reception towards Nala has been generally mixed; both film and feminist critics have accused the film of lacking empowering roles for female characters, including Nala. James Berardinelli of ReelViews appreciated the fact that "after three animated motion pictures centered upon the love of two people from different worlds", the love story between Nala and Simba has been relegated to that of "a subplot." Desson Howe of The Washington Post advised parents to remind their daughters that despite the fact that Nala "pads in the supportive shadows, awaiting her inevitable marriage to Simba, it doesn't mean human girls can't grow up to be monarchs too."

Nala's role and demeanor during the film's romantic "Can You Feel the Love Tonight" sequence has drawn criticism in regards to her "submissive behaviour". The New York Times' Janet Maslin cited the film's lack of a strong heroine among its weaknesses, dismissing Nala and Simba's interaction throughout "Can You Feel the Love Tonight" as "obligatory" and "gratuitous". Joel W. Martin wrote in the Journal of Religion and Film, "One song later, [Nala and Simba] have fallen in love. Playing one day, they literally tumble down a hillside in the jungle, and he ends up on top of her. This time, she does not bear her teeth, but instead, shows 'bedroom eyes'". Martin ultimately accused the scene's "reversal of positions" of "establish[ing] male dominance." Criticizing the film for "being merely distracting when it could have been both meaningful and instructive", Robert Humanick of Slant Magazine wrote, "Small potatoes, then, when Simba's former childhood friend and betrothed queen Nala ... unexpectedly reappears in his duty-free, protein-rich life, demanding he return to his kingly responsibilities and coaxing the lion to sleep tonight with arguably the most blatant 'fuck me now' face to ever appear in a PG-rated film." Kathryn LeBey Davidson of Her Campus believes that Nala's reputation is harmed by her limited screen time and role, ranking her the 19th greatest Disney heroine. More recently, the possibility of an incestuous relationship involving Simba, his mate Nala, Scar and Mufasa has surfaced. According to Johnson Cheu, author of Diversity in Disney Films: Critical Essays on Race, Ethnicity, Gender, Sexuality and Disability, the fact that Mufasa, Scar, and Simba appear to be the only male lions present in The Lion King suggests the possibility that either Mufasa or Scar is Nala's father, which would in turn make Nala either Simba's half-sister or cousin.

However, the character has garnered positive reviews as well. Sara Franks-Allen of ScreenCrush wrote that "If being a Disney princess is about being a good role model for little girls, then Nala has a lot in her favor", elaborating, "She's strong enough to take down Simba, ventures out on her own to find help for her pride and calls Simba out for ignoring his responsibilities." Meanwhile, Ella Ceron of Thought Catalog ranked Nala 14th on her list of "The 16 Most Awesome Female Characters From Disney Movies". Responsible for introducing the seasoned actress to a younger audience, Kelly's vocal performance as Nala has garnered critical acclaim. Writing for The Washington Post, Desson Howe hailed Kelly's voice acting as "terrific." Jeremy Gerard of Variety commended Kelly for voicing the character "beautifully". PopSugar ranked Kelly among the website's "Favorite Animated Voices", writing, "there are a lot of great voices in Disney's The Lion King ... but Moira Kelly has a unique quality to her voice, and I remember reveling in it as a youngster anytime the adult Nala was on the screen." Official Disney Blogs published an article entitled "We All Thought it… But Nala Actually Said It", which cites the character's most revered quotes. The blog also ranked Nala eighth on the website's "Definitive Ranking of Disney Cats" list. In a 2014 interview, actor Eddie Redmayne admitted that Nala was his first "celebrity crush", having been specifically attracted to the character's "sweet" face and singing voice, referring to the experience as his "sexual awakening".

Reviewing the 2019 remake, Brandon Zachary from CBR praised Nala's growth in the film as being better than the original due to her rivalry with Shenzi. He enjoyed the fight between them at the climax, commenting it "has more weight than any of the other nameless fights that happen in the frenzy". USA Today's Brian Truitt praised Beyoncé's performance as Nala for bringing "all the necessary fire as Nala, a lion willing to do anything to protect her pride." Peter Debrug of Variety felt that Nala was an improvement from her animated version.
