= The Lion King: Friends in Need =

Disney children book

- Author: Justine Korman
- Illustrator: John Kurtz
- Language: English
- Genre: Children's
- Publisher: Golden Press
- Publication date: June 1994
- Publication place: United States
- Media type: Paperback
- ISBN: 978-0-307-62848-0

The Lion King: Friends In Need is a children's book based on Disney's The Lion King. The book tells how Zazu came to be Mufasa's advisor. Canonically, it conflicts with How True, Zazu? from The Lion King: Six New Adventures.

== Plot ==
Zazu is about to be cooked and eaten by the three hyenas (Shenzi, Banzai and Ed) when a young Mufasa arrives, frightens off the hyenas and saves him. Zazu is thankful and hopes that he can be of service to the Lion King someday. Mufasa is doubtful of this.

Zazu follows Mufasa around and watches over him. Mufasa tires of this quickly as Zazu disturbs his hunts and his private time with Sarabi.

One day, Zazu notices some vultures hovering. Zazu then asks Mufasa if he wants him to fly over and see what's happening, but Mufasa is not concerned and lies down for a nap. Zazu flies over to where the vultures are anyway and sees that Sarabi has fallen into a pit and can't get out. Zazu flies back to tell Mufasa who leaps up and runs to the gorge, but once he arrives he can't find a way to rescue Sarabi. Zazu finds a tree trunk that Mufasa drags over to the pit, allowing Sarabi to climb out. Mufasa realizes that the hornbill is useful after all and appoints him as royal advisor.
