= Mufasa =

Fictional character from The Lion King

- The Lion King character
- First appearance: The Lion King (1994)
- Created by: Irene Mecchi; Jonathan Roberts; Linda Woolverton
- Designed by: Tony Fucile
- Voiced by: James Earl Jones (1994-2019); Keith David (House of Mouse, 2024-present); Gary Anthony Williams (The Lion Guard); Aaron Pierre (Mufasa: The Lion King); Braelyn Rankins (cub; Mufasa: The Lion King)

In-universe information
- Species: Lion
- Title: King of the Pride Lands
- Family: Scar (younger brother); Ahadi (father; in Six New Adventures); Uru (mother; in Six New Adventures); Mohatu (grandfather; in The Brightest Star)
- Spouses: Sarabi (mate)
- Children: Simba (son)
- Relatives: Nala (daughter-in-law); Kopa (grandson; in Six New Adventures); Kiara (granddaughter); Kion (grandson); Kovu (grandson-in-law); Rani (granddaughter-in-law)

Mufasa is a fictional character in Disney's The Lion King franchise. He first appears in the 1994 animated film as King of the Pride Lands and father to Simba, who he is raising to inherit the kingdom. Mufasa is killed by his younger brother, Scar, to usurp the throne. Mufasa's death forces Simba into exile, but his ghost later appears to an adult Simba, urging his son to return home and confront his responsibilities as the rightful heir.

Created by screenwriters Irene Mecchi, Jonathan Roberts, and Linda Woolverton, Mufasa underwent several changes during production of The Lion King. Notably, the decision to make Mufasa and Scar brothers was intended to strengthen the plot, and Mufasa was reintroduced as a spirit to give Simba a compelling reason to return to Pride Rock. The filmmakers extensively debated whether showing Mufasa's death on-screen was suitable for a children's film. Some writers suggested it should occur off-screen, but director Rob Minkoff insisted on depicting it explicitly, an unprecedented choice for an animated film. The character was voiced by James Earl Jones. Mufasa's animation, supervised by Tony Fucile, drew inspiration from Jones's mannerisms and smile.

Jones received widespread acclaim for his performance. While some critics and audiences initially debated whether Mufasa's death was too frightening for children—many comparing it to the death of Bambi's mother in Bambi (1942)—the scene is retrospectively regarded as one of the most memorable deaths in film history, particularly resonating with millennials. Several publications have also celebrated Mufasa as one of the greatest fictional fathers in popular culture.

Mufasa has appeared in various tie-in media and merchandise. Jones reprised the role in the 2019 remake of The Lion King, the only main cast member to return from the original film and one of his final performances before his death in 2024. A prequel to the remake, Mufasa: The Lion King, was released in 2024, and explores Mufasa's childhood. Actor Samuel E. Wright received a Tony Award nomination for originating the role on Broadway in the film's 1997 stage adaptation.

== Role ==
In The Lion King (1994), King Mufasa rules over the Pride Lands alongside his mate, Queen Sarabi. Their young son, Simba, is destined to inherit the throne. Mufasa teaches Simba about the "Circle of Life" and the delicate balance required to maintain harmony in the Pride Lands. Mufasa advises Simba to prepare for the day when Simba will succeed him as king. However, Mufasa's envious younger brother, Scar, covets the throne and devises a scheme to eliminate both Mufasa and Simba. Scar lures Simba into a gorge and orchestrates a wildebeest stampede, knowing Mufasa will risk his life to save his son. After rescuing Simba, Mufasa is swept into the stampede and struggles to escape. Reaching for Scar's help at the gorge's edge, Mufasa is betrayed as Scar pushes him to his death. Scar manipulates Simba into feeling responsible for his father's death, prompting the guilt-ridden cub to flee the Pride Lands. Lost and alone, Simba finds refuge in the jungle oasis, where he is raised by the carefree Timon and Pumbaa, a meerkat and a warthog. Despite his relaxed new lifestyle, Simba remains haunted by guilt over his father's death. Years later, Simba encounters Rafiki, a wise mandrill, (Note: Although often erroneously referred to as a baboon, Rafiki is actually a mandrill.) who reveals that Mufasa's spirit endures within him. Mufasa appears to Simba as a ghostly vision in the sky, urging him to accept his responsibilities and reclaim his place as king. Inspired, Simba returns to the Pride Lands, defeats Scar, and fulfills his destiny as Mufasa's successor. In The Lion King II: Simba's Pride (1998), Mufasa has a smaller role, appearing in the sky to offer guidance to Simba and communicating with Rafiki through the wind.

== Development ==
=== Creation ===
The Lion King was the first Disney Renaissance (Note: The Disney Renaissance was a period from 1989 to 1999 when Walt Disney Feature Animation experienced a resurgence in critical and commercial acclaim, releasing some of the studio's most successful animated films. The Lion King was the fifth film released during this period.) film to focus on a father-son relationship. Producer Don Hahn described the film as "essentially a love story between a father and a son ... It's about that moment in life when you realise that your father is going to pass on to you his wisdom and knowledge". In early drafts of the script, Mufasa was not related to Scar, (Note: In early versions of the story, Scar was originally a rogue lion unrelated to Mufasa, before the filmmakers incorporated inspiration from William Shakespeare's play Hamlet.) but the producers decided that making these characters brothers would strengthen the story. However, their physical appearances had already been finalized, leaving little family resemblance between the siblings. According to director Rob Minkoff, they had always imagined that Mufasa accidentally gave Scar his eponymous scar when they were cubs. Although Mufasa and Scar refer to each other as "brothers" as members of the same pride, Hahn retrospectively suggested that Mufasa and Scar sharing parents would be unlikely because lion prides typically have only one adult male, with younger, rogue lions often killing a pride's patriarch and his offspring to assert dominance. (Note: In a 2017 interview, producer Don Hahn received extensive media coverage when he suggested that, contrary to popular belief, Mufasa and Scar are not blood-related brothers due to power and gender dynamics that typically limit lion prides to one adult male. Hahn said Scar alludes to their nonrelation by describing himself as belonging to "the shallow end of the gene pool". Following fan outcry, Hahn's statement was retracted by director Rob Minkoff.)

Hahn credited directors Minkoff and Roger Allers with deepening Mufasa and Simba's relationship, such as when the cub places his paw inside of his father's pawprint. Allers was particularly attached to the material, due to his own father having died shortly before he started working on the film, and hoped to dedicate The Lion King to all fathers. Screenwriter Linda Woolverton described writing Mufasa's death as realizing they would need to make him "the greatest father that ever lived" for his death to feel impactful. By the time Minkoff became involved, they had already decided Mufasa would die from a stampede, albeit in a less brutal manner. Death via stampede was chosen because lions lack natural predators. (Note: Although Mufasa's exact cause of death is not shown on-screen after Scar throws him from the cliff, critics agree that the character was "trampled to death" by the stampeding wildebeests.) His cause of death was one of the few ideas that remained unchanged during production, although there were some early discussions brainstorming exactly how Mufasa should die. While doing research for the film, Woolverton suggested "drowning" Mufasa in a wildebeest stampede, after seeing photographs of "how frenetic and unstoppable" wildebeests are when migrating. Minkoff lobbied in favor of exploring Mufasa's death in more detail, which was unusual for an animated film at the time. The director also understood the risk of killing a character as important as Mufasa after viewers had already become attached.

Although they drew inspiration from the implied off-screen death of Bambi's mother in Bambi (1942), Minkoff argued that The Lion King should confront Mufasa's death more directly by having Simba interact with his dead body on-screen. According to art director Andy Gaskill, the decision to slowly reveal Mufasa's corpse as the dust clears from the scene heightens its realism by allowing audiences and Simba to realize what has occurred simultaneously. The creative team was initially divided on whether showing Mufasa's death was appropriate for the film's target audience, and carefully re-wrote the scene to straddle "'the sweet spot of emotion,' pushing just far enough without making the scene too overwhelming for its young audience". Despite its short length, (Note: Mufasa's death scene occurs thirty-two minutes and ten seconds into the film and last five minutes, according to Preaching Today.) Mufasa's death required approximately 30 filmmakers and over two years to complete; it was the last scene finished, despite being the first storyboarded. Inbetweener Rachel Bibb was one of the crew members who was shocked that Disney retained the sequence.

Mufasa's death prompted the filmmakers to conceive ways to lighten the film's mood afterward. Minkoff suggested sending Simba into exile immediately, which allowed the emotional impact of Mufasa to be alleviated by Timon and Pumbaa's humor. Originally, they had not planned for Mufasa to reappear after dying, but they wanted Simba to have a valid reason to return to Pride Rock, and decided his father's ghost should convince him. Mufasa's death and return as a ghost are among several thematic similarities The Lion King shares with William Shakespeare's play Hamlet, from which screenwriters Irene Mecchi and Jonathan Roberts drew inspiration. However, they removed a version of Mufasa's death that included the Hamlet line "good night, sweet prince" to avoid sounding "too self-conscious". Animator Chris Sanders and story artist Brenda Chapman were responsible for drafting the scene where Mufasa's spirit tells Simba to return home. Since it was one of the first scenes written for the film, Chapman wrote Mufasa's dialogue as repeating "remember" to call back to an earlier moment when Mufasa scolds Simba for visiting the elephant graveyard. She had intended for the dialogue to merely serve as a placeholder, but it was ultimately retained. From the dialogue, Sanders determined that the character would manifest as either "a lifelike ghost, a series of stars, or just a dark presence" in the scene. To elevate his storyboards per the directors' feedback, Sanders drew inspiration from a musical excerpt from the film The Mission (1986), and used pastels "to fully encapsulate a vision of Mufasa emerging from the clouds".

=== Voice ===
Actor Sean Connery was Disney's initial choice to voice Mufasa, and actor Liam Neeson was also considered. Mufasa was voiced by American actor James Earl Jones, who Woolverton admitted was the stronger candidate despite Connery being her first choice. Disney said it was difficult to envision anyone other than Jones voicing Mufasa once the character was fully realized. Jones gravitated towards the role because he was impressed by drawings he had seen of Mufasa and relished the opportunity to create a character using only his voice, saying the process reminded him of his early career performing on radio. As a prolific thespian, he was also drawn to the film's Shakespearean elements. He described voice acting as the "purest form" of acting, likening it to performing in ancient Greek theatre "where the actors would wear masks. In our case, the masks are the animators' drawings and we just simply supply all the behaviors, emotions, and feelings behind that mask".

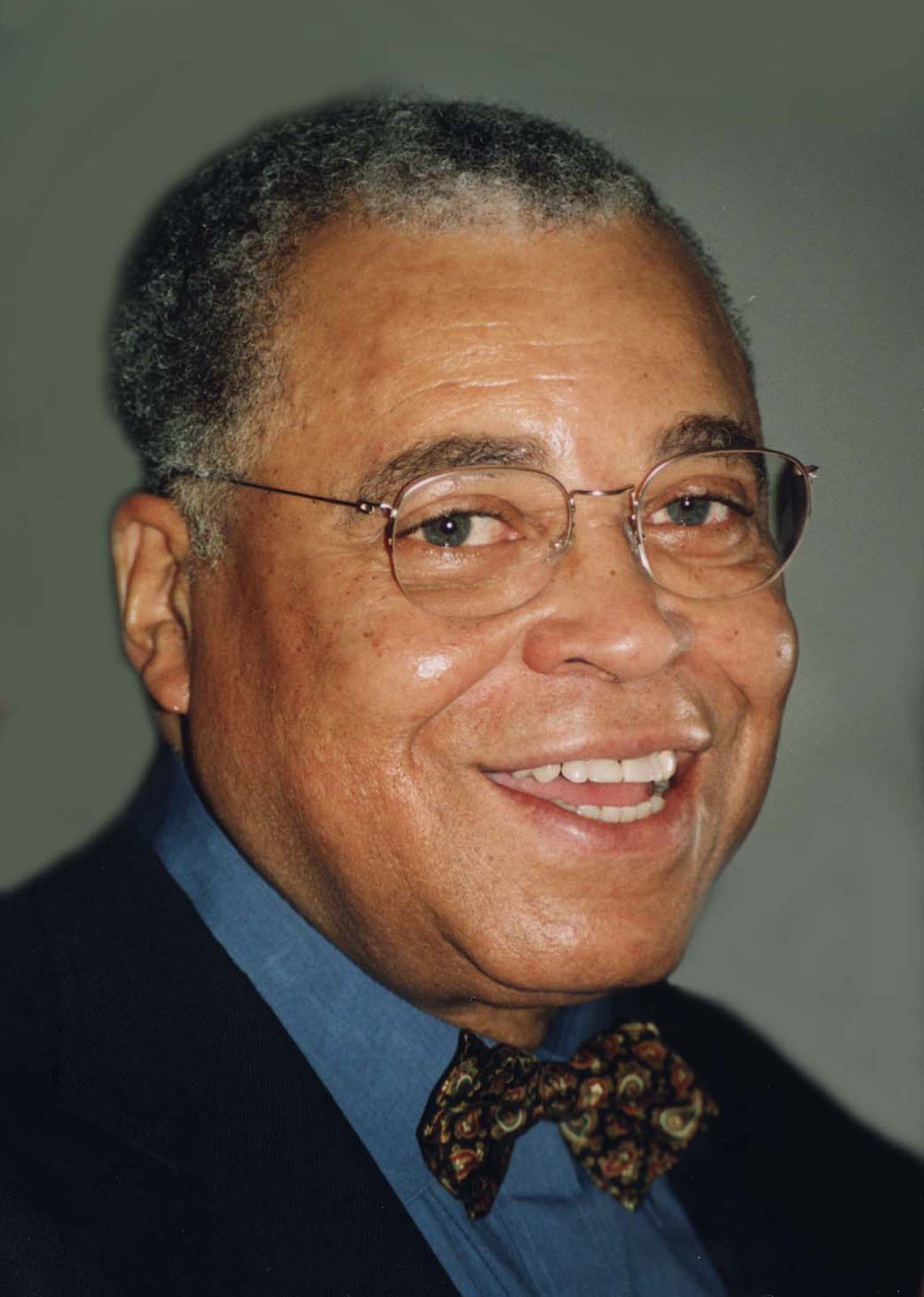
Actor James Earl Jones voiced Mufasa in the original film, several sequels, and the 2019 remake.

Jones admitted to originally making the error of forcing his character to sound regal, which he corrected upon receiving direction to voice Mufasa as himself, who the actor described as more akin to "a dopey dad". Jones explained that "Fathers are not always grand, certainly not with their sons. When you accommodate being a father, you are often dopey and goofy". Inspired by his revised tone of voice, the animators proceeded to incorporate Jones's own facial expressions into Mufasa's. Minkoff and Allers praised Jones's work on the film, recalling that Jones's vocal exercises alone "sometimes sounded like a real lion with a rumbling growl". Allers said that Jones's voice would already echo throughout the studio without the aid of a microphone. Nonetheless, they strategically placed six microphones around his head to create the illusion that his voice was "coming from everywhere". Jones worked on the film sporadically for over two years until Disney was satisfied. A song originally written for the character was not used in the final film once Disney realized Jones was unable to perform it. Entitled "To Be King", it was ultimately reworked into "I Just Can't Wait To Be King", performed by Simba. Jones and actress Madge Sinclair, who voiced Sarabi, had previously played the king-and-queen couple in the romantic comedy film Coming to America (1988). The actor voiced the character again for tie-in projects such as The Lion King II: Simba's Pride (1998) and The Lion Guard: Return of the Roar (2015).

In 2011, Jones said he would often prove to younger children that he was the voice of Mufasa by saying, in his character's voice, "Simba. You have deliberately disobeyed me". Jones was the only original cast member to reprise their role in the 2019 remake of The Lion King. The remake's director, Jon Favreau, was surprised that he agreed to return. Out of respect and admiration for the actor, Favreau refused to give Jones direction regarding his performance, reassuring him that he already embodied the character. While most of the remake's cast recorded together in a black box theater in California, Jones worked solo from a New York-based recording studio. Much of the character's dialogue from the original film was also retained for the remake, which was one of Jones's final film credits before his death on September 9, 2024.

Actor Aaron Pierre voiced the character in 2024's Mufasa: The Lion King, a prequel to the 2019 film, and cited Jones as one of his greatest inspirations. The prequel is dedicated to Jones's memory. Although Jones did not record any new material before he died, the film's director, Barry Jenkins, insisted on opening the prequel with Jones's speech from the original film, in which Mufasa explains to Simba that great kings from the past continue to watch over their descendants from the stars. Jenkins listened to all of Jones's dialogue from the original film before making this selection.

=== Personality and design ===
Jones described Mufasa as an authoritative, but ultimately gentle, father. Jones's staunch demeanor during recording sessions inspired supervising animator Tony Fucile. Fucile said Jones contributed both the regality and "fatherly warmth" the animators needed to create the character, explaining, "it was up to us to visually come up to that standard that he set with his voice". Specifically, the animators incorporated the "dopey smile" Jones would wear during recording sessions into Mufasa's face. Fucile found watching Jones's performance in the film Matewan (1987) to be particularly helpful because the actor "used a lot of facial expressions and eye movements to communicate", mirroring Mufasa's tendency to be subtle and convey a lot of emotion with little movement. The animators reused some design elements from Mufasa for adult Simba to make the latter look more heroic. Under Fucile, Phillip Young was another animator who worked on Mufasa, which Young referred to as his "best character assignment". Prior to The Lion King, Young had mostly animated action scenes, some of which he also did for Mufasa, but he considers the character the first time "in which I could exercise some acting chops". He also animated Mufasa's stampede scenes, as well as some of his interactions with Simba.

Animator Chris Wahl specifically requested to work on Mufasa because he admired Fucile and Jones's vocal performance. Despite the character's lack of footage due to his smaller role and already having an established an animation team, the filmmakers allowed Wahl to help animate the character. Maquettes of Mufasa were created by animation sculptor Kent Melton.

== Reception ==
Critics and audiences initially expressed varying opinions about Mufasa's death. According to Jessica Wang of Entertainment Weekly, no viewer of the film was left "emotionally unaffected". Dan Webster of The Spokesman-Review called the moment "a plot twist unfamiliar to this era of family-values emphasis". At the time of the film's release, news outlets reported that several parents complained that the scene was inappropriate for a film marketed towards younger viewers, and voiced concerns about children potentially experiencing nightmares, worrying about their own parents, and regressing. In return, some commentators accused said parents of being overprotective. According to Darryl E. Owens of Tampa Bay Times, child-development experts warned that his death could be traumatizing should parents fail to prepare their children before viewing. However, child therapist Mercedes Ojeda-Castro encouraged parents to use the opportunity to discuss death, and psychologist Rosalyn Laudati argued that the film could help children cope with parental loss and divorce. Several critics cited Mufasa's death as potentially frightening for younger viewers. In his review for Prodigy, William C. Banks accused Disney of finally overdoing their "increasingly weird predilection for cartoon violence". Journalist Janet Maslin questioned the film's G rating, and the Ottawa Citizen's Jay Stone said he "could have done without" Simba's attempt to awaken his dead father. Ranking it among Disney's most traumatic moments, Paolo Ragusa of Consequence said, "It may be cruel, but with years of reflection, it's a profoundly important detail in the scope of The Lion King ... and animated with palpable emotion and cinematic elegance". Several reviewers, such as Roger Ebert, compared Mufasa's death to Bambi's mother's. Variety's Jeremy Gerard suggested that parents who remember being traumatized by Bambi should use that film to gauge "who goes to The Lion King—and who stays home with the babysitter". However, Animation World Network's Rick DeMott implied that the public's reaction to Mufasa's death was muted in comparison.

Rob Humanick of Slant Magazine called Mufasa a "badass father figure", but Stone found him one-dimensional. Meanwhile, Jones received critical acclaim for his performance, which Kaushal S. of Soap Central deemed one of the most celebrated voice-acting performances in recent memory. Digital Spy's Simon Reynolds said Jones brought the character to life "brilliantly". Film critic David Sterritt and Elizabeth Gregory of the Evening Standard called him a standout among the film's cast, while Kate Erbland of Film School Rejects called his casting "both strikingly great and thuddingly obvious". Turner Classic Movies said the actor's "distinct baritone was put to excellent use". According to Daniel Carter of Beliefnet, Jones's efforts resulted in "a beloved character that resonated with audiences worldwide". Rebecca Kivak of The Scranton Times-Tribune said Mufasa's delivery earned her immediate respect. João Gabriel de Lima of Veja called Jones the film's standout performance, writing that Mufasa would have been less majestic without Jones' contribution. In a rare negative review, The Independent's Anthony Quinn found Jones's performance "insufferable" and "portentous". Lex Pryor of The Ringer said Jones outshone his co-stars in the remake, despite his limited screentime and dialogue.

Several publications consider Mufasa to be one of Jones's greatest performances of his career. Calling Mufasa one of "pop culture's most imposing dads", Noel Murray of The New York Times said that "Few other performers of Jones's era could have made characters so vivid while sitting in front of a microphone", while P. Ragusa of Consequence said the actor elevated the film's material, with his line delivery remaining "as poignant all these years later as it is necessary for the plot". Game Rant and Esquire Australia ranked The Lion King as his best performance. Mary Kate Carr of The A.V. Club said the actor "imbued the character with such dignity and distinction", to the point where he speaks the film's most iconic lines. Wilson Chapman of IndieWire said "Few actors have ever been better suited for a voice role than Jones was for Mufasa", calling the actor equally effective during his quieter moments parenting Simba. According to Paste, The Lion King is the actor's sixth-best movie. Pinkvilla's Suhasini Oswal wrote that Jones's "performance defined the character's regal and compassionate nature, cementing his place in the hearts of generations".

== Cultural impact ==
=== Legacy and commendations ===
Matt Fowler of IGN called Mufasa as a household name. In 2014, Camille Dautrich of the Springfield News-Leader described Mufasa as one "of the world's most beloved animated characters". Some journalists have described him as one of the best Disney animated characters. Mufasa has been described by several publications as one of the greatest fathers to have appeared on film; Zach Seemayer of Entertainment Tonight ranked him among "the 13 greatest fictional fathers in movie history", and Business Insider called him one of the 19 "best fictional dads of all time". Jeff Peterson of the Deseret News said the character "demonstrates the qualities of a good father, which, incidentally, are the same qualities needed for Simba to become a good ruler later on". In 2022, Indy100 recognized Mufasa as one of the 100 greatest on-screen fathers, and Euronews included him among "The 12 best on-screen dads of all time". GamesRadar+ named the character the fifth-greatest movie father figure. The Daily Beast ranked him the sixth "coolest movie dad", and Brian Tallerico of Vulture declared Mufasa to be Disney's most iconic father. America writer John Dougherty described Mufasa as "graceful and dignified, but also warm and playful—the ideal father". Jenkins believes that, to himself and other fans, Mufasa became synonymous with surrogate fatherhood. Meanwhile, Maddie Garfinkle of People declared him "one of the greatest kings" in "the history of animated cinema". Mufasa is "one of the most famous lions of all time", according to Jenna Mullins of E!.

Mufasa was Jones's most famous animated performance and one of the most popular roles of his career, arguably second to Darth Vader from the Star Wars franchise. Comparing the two roles, Kofi Outlaw of ComicBook.com said that, with Mufasa, Jones successfully transitioned "from being a nightmare bad dad in Star Wars, to being the dad every young cub (human or lion) wishes they had". Peter Debruge of Variety observed that which character Jones is associated with depends on if his fan was born before or after 1990. Mufasa is credited with introducing Jones to a younger generation of filmgoers, whereas Okla Jones of Essence said the role embedded "his legacy in the hearts of audiences young and old". According to Carlos Morales of IGN, Jones's voiceover work also brought credibility to a form of acting that continues to be undervalued. In 2019, The Walt Disney Company inducted Jones as a Disney Legend in the "voice" category for his "remarkable contributions to the Disney legacy". Many celebrities paid tribute to Jones after his death on September 9, 2024, with several referencing The Lion King. Crystal Kung Minkoff, a television personality and the director's wife, shared a photo of Jones holding a Mufasa maquette with the caption, "Rest in Power, Mr Jones. You made a young animator's dream come true when you accepted the role of Mufasa".

=== Death ===
Described by Isaac Williams of Comic Book Resources as "one of the most impactful moments of any Disney film", Mufasa's murder at the hands of Scar is widely regarded as one of the most memorable on-screen deaths in film history. The scenes comprising Mufasa's death and Simba's gradual realization have been described as inseparable from The Lion King franchise. Vanity Fair's Laura Bradley said Mufasa's death "became the benchmark against which all future film tragedies would be measured", comparing its legacy to that of Bambi's mother. Although death and violence had already been depicted in children's entertainment, Alex Spencer of The Escapist reported that nothing released before 1994 rivaled the immediate impact of Mufasa's death. Prior to Mufasa, deceased parents had typically died off-screen in Disney films, and Comic Book Resources considers The Lion King to be the first Disney film from the modern era to depict trauma resulting from death. Josh Spiegel of /Film heralded The Lion King as the only Disney film that rivaled Bambi's depiction of coming of age through tragedy. Writers for Legacy.com said both murders "affected the children of their generations and the generations to follow". Jonathan Allford of The Guardian theorized that few preceding or subsequent parental deaths in Disney films have been as emotionally devastating as Mufasa's, which he attributed to the character's benevolence and audience connection. Pediatrician and writer Perri Klass said that Mufasa's death subverted the absent or dead mother trope in Disney films by embracing the "90's-style celebration of the involved dad". Collider's Diego Pineda Pacheco observed that any conversation surrounding death in children's media is virtually guaranteed to discuss The Lion King, and Gem Seddon of GamesRadar+ ranked it as film's 20th saddest tearjerker.

Nadira Goffe of Slate said, as "one of the first and most visceral main-character deaths we would experience", Mufasa "traumatized an entire age group". Commentators agree that Mufasa's death was particularly impactful on millennials, with Rachel Paige of HelloGiggles saying that, to them, it eclipses all other cinematic moments. Dougherty, Tyler Dane Wingco of Esquire Australia, and Andrew Pulver of The Irish Times compared the phenomenon to the effect Bambi's mother had on baby boomers. Rebecca Hawkes of The Daily Telegraph called The Lion King "the defining cinematic shock of [millennial] youth", and writer Aisha Harris said Mufasa's "death served as their earliest encounter with the notion of losing a parent". According to Hollywood.com, Mufasa's death was the aforementioned group's "first traumatizing cinematic event", and arguably their first time witnessing death. The website also considers Mufasa's death as children's first confrontation with the reality that "the hero doesn't always triumph", prior to which cartoon heroes typically escaped death at the last minute. Dougherty, Hollywood.com, Marisa Mirabal of /Film, and Elena Merenda of The Conversation each credited The Lion King with teaching 1990s children how to reconcile complicated emotions stemming from the deaths of loved ones, while /Film's Hoai-Tran Bui said concepts such as death, loss, and grief were foreign to children until Mufasa. For Consequence, Dominick Mayer said the scene taught this generation about death, mortality, "and the responsibilities that the living have to the dead they once loved". Spiegel suggested that modern Disney films should return to Mufasa's example to abolish the "Disney Death" trope. Meanwhile, Panama Jackson of The Root called Mufasa's death "one of the most significant deaths in the black community of all time".

Scott Campbell of Far Out said that while Jones's performance "had already elevated Mufasa to iconic status", the character's death cemented him in "the minds of viewers everywhere", and consequently ranked him the eighth saddest death in film history. Readers of The Independent voted Mufasa's "the most iconic death scene". IGN ranked Mufasa's death "Disney's Most Traumatic Movie Moment", with author Lucy O'Brien writing that "a little bit of innocence in every child ... withered away forever". Despite ranking it the third most powerful animated death, Entertainment Weekly's Jonathan W. Gray called it arguably the most impactful one discussed. Best Life ranked it the 16th all-time saddest movie death.

=== In other media ===
To promote the release of The Lion King in 1994, Mufasa began appearing in a plethora of merchandise licensed by Disney Consumer Products. Mufasa's likeness has been used in several The Lion King tie-in products and media, including the PC game Disney's Animated Storybook: The Lion King (1994) and console game The Lion King: Simba's Mighty Adventure (2000). From 1995 to 2018, Mufasa provided the opening narration for the Epcot documentary Circle of Life: An Environmental Fable. In 2019, a Funko Pop! figurine was released to commemorate the remake, which Screen Rant ranked among "The 10 Best Disney Funko Pops". The character recurs in some episodes of the animated television series The Lion Guard (2016–2019), voiced by Gary Anthony Williams. Mufasa: The Lion King (2024), a prequel to the 2019 remake, focuses on Mufasa's childhood, formative relationships, and major events that ultimately lead to him becoming King of the Pride Lands. In this version, Mufasa is an orphan born outside of the royal family, and the plot explores his relationship with his adoptive brother, Taka, the disgraced heir who ultimately becomes "Scar". In December 2024, Pierre performed his "spirit tunnel" dance on The Jennifer Hudson Show, during which the show's staff chanted "Aaron Pierre, that's Mufasa". The performance went viral on social media in 2024 and 2025, eventually prompting the show to disable comments on the videos.

In 1997, actor Samuel E. Wright originated the role of Mufasa on Broadway in the stage adaptation of the film. Prior to The Lion King, he had voiced Sebastian in Disney's The Little Mermaid (1989). Mufasa's role in the show was expanded with the addition of the original songs "The Morning Report" and "They Live in You". Wright was initially reluctant to audition, fearing the role would be too similar to playing the Cowardly Lion from The Wizard of Oz (1939) or the Beast from Beauty and the Beast (1994), but relented once he saw director Julie Taymor's plans for the character's design and costume. He based his performance on Masai warriors who hunted lions, and learned to growl by researching lions at the Bronx Zoo. He also received physiotherapy regularly due to the physical demands of the role. Wright's performance received positive reviews from The New York Times and Variety theater critics. In 1998, he was nominated for the Tony Award for Best Featured Actor in a Musical.

Outside of The Lion King franchise, the character has appeared in the television series Disney's House of Mouse (2001) and the video game Kingdom Hearts II (2006). In The Simpsons episode '"Round Springfield" (1995), Mufasa appears in the clouds to Lisa Simpson, alongside Darth Vader and Jones. All three characters are voiced by Simpsons cast member Harry Shearer, despite Jones himself having guest starred on three earlier Simpsons episodes. In "Round Springfield", Mufasa mistakenly says the name "Kimba" before correcting himself to "Simba", which parodies allegations that The Lion King was inspired by the anime Kimba the White Lion. Chance the Rapper has referenced Mufasa in several of his songs, including "I Am Very Very Lonely" (2014), "Blessings" (2016), and "How Great" (2016). The rapper said he has always likened the character to his own father, and believes Mufasa "was a lot of young black boys' depiction of growing into manhood". He found himself identifying with Mufasa once he became a father himself. The character has also been name-dropped in songs by hip hop artists Wu-Tang Clan, Nicki Minaj, Smino, and Waka Flocka Flame.
