= The Lion Guard =

2016 American animated children's TV series

- Genre: Adventure; Comedy; Drama; Musical
- Based on: The Lion King
- Developed by: Ford Riley
- Directed by: Howy Parkins
- Voices of: Max Charles; Joshua Rush; Diamond White; Dusan Brown; Atticus Shaffer; Bryana Salaz (Note: Salaz's character was introduced in season 2 and became a main character in season 3.)
- Opening theme: "Call of the Guard" performed by The Lion Guard Chorus
- Ending theme: "Here Comes the Lion Guard" (Seasons 1–2) performed by Beau Black "The Power of the Roar" (Season 3) written by Ford Riley and Beau Black performed by Michael Luwoye
- Composers: Christopher Willis (score); Beau Black (songs)
- Country of origin: United States
- Original language: English
- No. of seasons: 3
- No. of episodes: 74 (list of episodes)

Production
- Executive producers: Ford Riley; Howy Parkins
- Running time: 22 minutes(though some special episodes extended runtimes)
- Production company: Disney Television Animation

Original release
- Network: Disney Channel (2015); Disney Junior (2016–2019)
- Release: January 15, 2016 – November 3, 2019 (Note: The series was first broadcast with a television film entitled "The Lion Guard: Return of the Roar" which aired on November 22, 2015, and began airing on Disney Junior as a TV series on January 15, 2016.)

The Lion Guard is an American animated children's television series developed by Ford Riley and based on Disney Animation's 1994 film The Lion King. The series was first broadcast with a television film titled The Lion Guard: Return of the Roar on Disney Channel on November 22, 2015, and began airing as a TV series on January 15, 2016, on Disney Junior. It is the second television series based on The Lion King following The Lion King's Timon & Pumbaa (1995–1999), taking place both before and during the events of The Lion King II: Simba's Pride.

The second season premiered on July 7, 2017, followed by the third on August 3, 2019, with the series finale airing on November 3 the same year.

== Premise ==
The Lion Guard is a group that serves to protect the circle of life, traditionally led by the second born of the King and Queen. Simba and Nala's son Kion finds himself taking up the title last held and tainted by his evil great-uncle Scar.

Despite the tradition that the Lion Guard has always been made of lions, Kion appoints his friends Bunga the honey badger, Beshte the hippopotamus, Fuli the cheetah, and Ono the western cattle egret, and together, they set out to keep their homeland safe and protect it from animals who disrespect the Circle of Life. As leader of the Lion Guard, Kion possesses the Roar of the Elders, a powerful roar that can become corrupted when used in anger and be lost when deliberately used for evil.

At the start of Season 2, the Lion Guard's mission becomes harder when Kion's evil deceased great uncle Scar returns as a fiery spirit and plans to destroy the Pride Lands. Scar forms an army consisted of animals from the Outlands. This eventually leads to an all-out battle between the Pridelanders and the Outlanders.

By Season 3, the guards, now adolescents, successfully defeat Scar. Afterward, they leave the Pride Lands in Africa to locate the Tree of Life in Asia to cure Kion and Ono's battle injuries, Kion having received a venomous scar from Ushari the cobra and Ono losing his eyesight from the poisonous volcanic fumes while rescuing Bunga. Kion's team also gets a new member, a martial eagle named Anga who replaces Ono as the keenest of sight after Ono temporarily loses his eyesight, while the latter gains a new position as the smartest.

Once reaching the Tree of Life, the Lion Guard assists in defending the haven from intruders together with the Night Pride, the group and family who protects the Tree of Life. After Kion and Ono are healed and their enemies are defeated, hyenas Jasiri and Janja (the latter having reformed during the final confrontation with Scar) come looking for them and alert them that Zira and her pride are back.

The Lion Guard returns to the Pride Lands, only to find out that the conflict has already been settled. Zira's daughter, Vitani, has formed her own Lion Guard in their absence, causing an argument between them and Kion's Lion Guard. However, after seeing Vitani's confidence in becoming a leader even without the Roar, Kion allows Vitani's Lion Guard to succeed his Guard as defenders of the Pride Lands. Kion and his friends return to the Tree of Life where Kion marries the Night Pride's leader, Queen Rani, and is crowned king of the Tree of Life.

== Episodes ==
Season	Episodes	Originally released	
Season	Episodes	First released	Last released
Pilot		November 22, 2015	
1	26	January 15, 2016	April 21, 2017
2	29	July 7, 2017	April 22, 2019
3	19	August 3, 2019	November 3, 2019

== Characters ==
=== The Lion Guard ===
- Kion (voiced by Max Charles, singing voice by Aaron Daniel Jacob in season 3 except for "Battle for the Pride Lands") is a lion who is Simba and Nala's second-born cub, Mufasa's grandson, Kiara's younger brother, the Prince of the Pride Lands and the leader of the Lion Guard as well as its stalwart member known for his maverick but good-natured personality. He serves as the main protagonist of the series. He often exclaims "Hevi kabisa!" and he can be quick-tempered when provoked. His and the Lion Guard's catchphrase is "Till the Pride Lands end, Lion Guard defend!" By the end of the season 3 premiere "Battle for the Pride Lands", Kion gets a scar over his left eye due to being bit by the cobra Ushari before defeating his evil great-uncle Scar. Kion and the Lion Guard then journey to find the Tree of Life to heal him. Once reaching the Tree of Life, Kion meets the protectors of the tree, the Night Pride, who guides him during his recovery process. He and the Night Pride's leader Rani fall in love during his journey and they become the rulers of the tree of life in the series finale.
- Bunga (voiced by Joshua Rush) is a honey badger who is the bravest member of the Lion Guard. He is Timon and Pumbaa's adoptive nephew and Kion's best friend. He often exclaims "Un-Bunga-lievable!" His battle cry is "Zuka Zama!" In season three he meets a honey badger named Binga, and they fall in love.
- Fuli (voiced by Diamond White) is a cheetah who is the fastest member of the Lion Guard, the only female member (before Anga), Kion's friend and second-in-command. She is also the first female animal to ever serve in the Guard as mentioned in the season 2 special The Rise of Scar. Her battle cry is "Huwezi!" In season three, she develops romantic feelings for a cheetah named Azaad.
- Beshte (voiced by Dusan Brown) is a hippopotamus who is the strongest member of the Lion Guard and Kion's friend. His gentle-giant persona extends to everyone, as he acts like a big brother to the younger members of his herd, a friend to animals of all different species, and a protector of the Pride Lands at large. He often exclaims "Poa!" His battle cry is "Twende Kiboko!"
- Ono (voiced by Atticus Shaffer) is an egret who is Kion's friend. Ono was the keenest of sight of the Lion Guard until his eyes were damaged while saving Bunga in "Battle for the Pride Lands". Ono respectfully relinquishes his original role to Anga, though Kion keeps Ono as part of the Lion Guard by giving him the new role of the smartest member, due to Ono's vast knowledge of all kinds of animals, the environment and much more. He often exclaims "Hapana!" In Season 3, he also often mutters "Nawaza" whenever he tries to think, most commonly when he tries to remember to locations on the map to the Tree of Life. He is the youngest member of the Lion Guard.
- Anga (voiced by Bryana Salaz) is a martial eagle who takes over as the keenest of sight from Ono at the start of season 3. Her battle cry is "Anga Lenga!"

=== The Lion King alumni ===
Characters from across The Lion King franchise return in this series:

- Simba (voiced by Rob Lowe) is a lion who is Mufasa's son, Nala's mate, Scar's nephew and Kiara and Kion's father. He is the king of the Pride Lands and the leader of his pride. His father died when he was a young cub. Simba and Bunga share a history of being raised by Timon and Pumbaa, as pointed in the season 1 episode, "Bunga and the King". Lowe replaces Matthew Broderick, who previously voiced the character in the original film and sequel.
- Nala (voiced by Gabrielle Union) is a lioness, who is Simba's mate and Kiara and Kion's mother. She is the queen of the Pride Lands. Union replaces Moira Kelly, who voiced Nala in the original film and sequel.
- Kiara (voiced by Eden Riegel) is a lioness who is Simba and Nala's daughter, Mufasa's granddaughter, Kion's older sister, the princess of the Pride Lands and its future queen. Riegel also voiced young adult Kiara (replacing Neve Campbell, who voiced young adult Kiara in The Lion King II: Simba's Pride) in the series finale "Return to the Pride Lands". Riegel also replaces Michelle Horn, who voiced young Kiara in Simba's Pride.
- Timon (voiced by Kevin Schon) is Simba and Pumbaa's quick-witted meerkat friend. Timon is Bunga's adoptive uncle. Schon, who previously voiced Timon in Timon & Pumbaa and other various media, replaces Nathan Lane, who voiced Timon in the original film and sequels.
- Pumbaa (voiced by Ernie Sabella) is Simba and Timon's genial warthog friend. Pumbaa is Bunga's other adoptive uncle. Sabella reprises his role from the original film and other prior appearances.
- Rafiki (voiced by Khary Payton) is a wise old mandrill who serves as a Royal Mjuzi (a Pride Lands word for knowledge keeper and advisor) for the Royal Family of Pride Rock. Payton becomes the current voice of the character replacing Robert Guillaume, who voiced Rafiki in all prior appearances.
- Zazu (voiced by Jeff Bennett) is a red-billed hornbill who is Simba's majordomo and supplies news via the Morning Report of the Pride Lands. Bennett replaces Edward Hibbert, who, in turn, replaced Rowan Atkinson in the original film as the voice of Zazu in Simba's Pride. Bennett previously provided Zazu's singing voice in the 2003 special edition of The Lion King for the song "The Morning Report".
- Mufasa (voiced by James Earl Jones in Return of the Roar, reprising his role from The Lion King and its sequels, and Gary Anthony Williams for the rest of the series) is Simba's late father and Kiara and Kion's grandfather who was the previous king of the Pride Lands in the original film before being murdered by his younger brother, Scar. Since his death, he lives on as a spirit that gives Kion advice on how to get through any tough plight.
- Scar (voiced by David Oyelowo) is Simba's cruel deceased uncle, Kion and Kiara's great-uncle and Mufasa's younger brother. In his youth, Scar was the leader of the Lion Guard, gifted with the Roar of the Elders. During his young adulthood, he befriended a rogue lion from the Outlands, who leads him into the jaws of a cobra, who gave him his scar. In retaliation, Scar used the Roar to kill the lion and snake, however, Mufasa mocked his brother and gave him the nickname of Scar, leading to Scar plotting to dethrone Mufasa, before abusing his power by using the Roar to destroy his Guard. In the years that followed the Lion Guard's downfall, Scar plots with the hyenas to rule over the Pride Lands, eventually leading to Mufasa's death, and Simba's exile from the Pride Lands. After being defeated by an now older Simba in a final violent fight in the original film, he was mauled to death by the hyenas when he betrayed them by trying to pin the blame of Mufasa's death on them after initially blaming Simba. By the end of The Rise of Scar, Kion unintentionally summons Scar back as a fiery spirit in the Outlands' volcano after he uses the Roar in anger when Janja provokes him. Scar then begins to form plans to take over the Pride Lands and rule it forever. However, by the end of the third season's premiere Battle for the Pride Lands, Scar is finally exiled and sent back to the afterlife by Kion. Oyelowo replaces Jim Cummings, who, in turn, replaced Jeremy Irons as the voice of Scar in Simba's Pride.
- The Outsiders are a pride of offshoot lions that were loyal to Scar. After Scar's death, Simba exiled them from the Pride Lands. In the third season, they reform and join Simba's pride under Kovu and Kiara's future rule.
  - Zira (voiced by Nika Futterman) is a lioness who is the matriarch of Kovu's family and the leader of the Outsiders. After the death of Scar, Simba exiled her and her clan from the Pride Lands. While Kion and the Lion Guard are on their journey to the Tree of Life, Zira attacks the Pride Lands, which leads to her death, as seen in Simba's Pride. Futterman replaces Suzanne Pleshette, who had previously portrayed the character.
  - Kovu (voiced by Jason Marsden) is a lion who is Zira's youngest son and the younger brother of Nuka and Vitani. Before the series, he briefly befriended (and later fell in love with) Kiara. In Return to the Pride Lands, Kovu is now Kion's older brother-in-law. Marsden reprises his role from Simba's Pride and replaces Ryan O'Donohue who voiced Kovu as a cub.
  - Nuka (voiced by Andy Dick) is an adolescent lion who is the oldest son of Zira and the older brother of Kovu and Vitani. Parallel to the third season of the series, Nuka died in the struggle to kill Simba. Dick reprises his role from Simba's Pride.
  - Vitani (voiced by Lacey Chabert) is a lioness who is Zira's daughter and the sister of Nuka and Kovu. Years later after she and her pride joined Simba's, Vitani formed her own Lion Guard in Kion's Guard's absence. Chabert, who voiced young Vitani in Simba's Pride, replaces Meredith Scott Lynn, who voiced young adult Vitani.

=== Supporting ===
- Tiifu (voiced by Sarah Hyland in Return of the Roar, season 1 and The Rise of Scar and Bailey Gambertoglio in season 2) is a lion friend of Kiara and a member of Simba's Pride who is somewhat more reasonable than her constant companion Zuri.
- Zuri (voiced by Madison Pettis) is another lion friend of Kiara and a member of Simba's Pride who is somewhat haughty and hates getting dirty.
- Makini (voiced by Landry Bender) is a young mandrill who becomes Rafiki's apprentice. She is one of a few characters who know that Kion speaks to the spirit of Mufasa. In Season 3, she went along with the Lion Guard to the Tree of Life. Following Queen Janna's passing, Makini is made Rani's Royal Mjuzi.
- Vitani's Lion Guard are a group of lionesses seen in the series finale led by Kovu's sister Vitani who is the Fiercest member of her guard who take the role of the Lion Guard during Kion and his Lion Guard's absence, due to their journey to the Tree of Life.
  - Shabaha (voiced by Fiona Riley) is the Bravest member of Vitani's Lion Guard, known for her level of insanity. Her fighting style is similar to Bunga, but whereas Bunga's bravery leaves him dimwitted, Shabaha's makes her slightly unhinged and often laughs maniacally in the midst of a challenge. Her catchphrase is "Bila hofu!"
  - Kasi (voiced by Savannah Smith) is the Fastest member of Vitani's Lion Guard, noted to have Fuli's level of serenity. Though without the advantage of Fuli's cheetah speed, Kasi has more constant stamina as she is a lion and agility in part due to her thin build. Her catchphrase is "Haraka, haraka!"
  - Imara (voiced by Rachel Crow) is the strongest member of Vitani's Lion Guard, given her tenacity. With a stocky build, she proves nearly as strong as Beshte. Her catchphrase is "Misuli!"
  - Tazama (voiced by Sophie Reynolds) is the Keenest of Sight in Vitani's Lion Guard, as well as a supportive team player. While not able to fly like Anga or Ono, Tazama is capable of seeing in darkness and has some level of Ono's tact. Her catchphrase is "Hiyo kali!"
- Jasiri's Clan are a clan of friendly hyenas that resides in the Outlands. Unlike Janja's clan, Jasiri and her hyena clan respect the Circle of Life and mostly scavenge for food. When Jasiri learns from Kion that Scar has returned, she and her clan form a hyena resistance to aid the Lion Guard and help defeat Scar. After the season 3 premiere Battle for the Pride Lands, Jasiri and Janja's clan have unified as one and rule the Outlands with Jasiri in charge.
  - Jasiri (voiced by Maia Mitchell) is a hyena living in the Outlands who is the leader of the clan and allies with Kion. In season 2, after learning of Scar's spiritual return to the Outlands, Jasiri forms the Hyena Resistance, consisting of her entire clan in an attempt to overthrow Scar as the leader of the Outlands. In season 3, Jasiri accepts Janja and his clan as members of her clan and after the defeat and destruction of Scar, Jasiri becomes the leader of the Outlands.
  - Madoa (voiced by Maisie Klompus) is a hyena who is Jasiri's sister and is part of her clan.
  - Tunu (voiced by Crimson Hart) is a hyena cub and brother of Wema who is part of Jasiri's clan.
  - Wema (voiced by Fiona Hart) is a hyena cub and sister of Tunu who is part of Jasiri's clan.
- Makuu (voiced by Blair Underwood) is a formerly villainous crocodile who is the leader of the crocodile float, reforming from his troublemaking ways.
- Janja's clan are a clan of male hyenas that live in the Outlands. Initially, they disrespect the Circle of Life, but after being betrayed and almost killed by Scar, they join forces with Scar's enemies to help destroy him once and for all. After the destruction of Scar and the death of Ushari, Janja and Jasiri's clan merge as one and rule over the Outlands with Jasiri in charge while keeping the other Outlanders in line.
  - Janja (voiced by Andrew Kishino) is initially a cunning, arrogant and vicious hyena, who is the leader of his all-male clan, later a friendly and loyal hyena.
  - Cheezi (voiced by Vargus Mason) is an excitable hyena who is one of Janja's right-hand henchmen.
  - Chungu (voiced by Kevin Schon) is an unintelligent hyena with a slightly heavier build than the other hyenas, who is the other of Janja's right-hand henchmen.
  - Nne (voiced by Beau Black) is a stout but a sly and smart spotted hyena.
  - Tano (voiced by Dee Bradley Baker) is a sloping but devious and smart spotted hyena.
- Mzingo's Flock are a parliament of vultures that live in the Outlands and is allied with Janja's clan and later Jasiri's clan following Scar's defeat.
  - Mzingo (voiced by Greg Ellis) is a calculative vulture who is the leader of the parliament. He sometimes serves as Janja's spy and scout. Later in season 3, he reform as Jasiri's friend and ally.
  - Mwoga (voiced by Cam Clarke) is a foolish and clumsy vulture who is the spy of the parliament.
- Azaad (voiced by Behzad Dabu) is a prideful Asiatic cheetah that the Lion Guard encounter in his canyon during their journey to the Tree of Life. He later helped them to the Tree of Life where he visited before and guided them down the fastest route to the Pride Lands where he later meets Simba and Nala. He is also Fuli's love interest.
- Askari (voiced by Michael Luwoye) is a lion and the leader of the original Lion Guard who was the second-born of the unnamed king and queen and a distant relative of Mufasa, Simba, and Kion. His spirit teaches Kion about how the roar works during Kion's journey to the Tree of Life.
- The Night Pride is a pride of lions who protect the Tree of Life.
  - Rani (speaking voice by Peyton Elizabeth Lee and singing voice by Lana McKissack) is the leader of the Night Pride and Kion's love interest. Following the death of her grandmother, Rani becomes Queen of the Tree of Life. At the end of the series, she marries Kion. Her and the Night Pride's catchphrase is "With strength & respect, Night Pride protect!"
  - Baliyo (voiced by Hudson Yang) is Rani's younger brother. His battle cry is "Ladai".
  - Surak (voiced by Lou Diamond Phillips) is Janna's son and Rani and Baliyo's uncle. His battle cry is Jogina.
  - Nirmala (voiced by Miki Yamashita) is the Night Pride's healer. She is the one who guides Kion in his recovery process. Her catchphrase is "Aramakaro".
  - Janna (voiced by Shohreh Aghdashloo) is the former queen of the Night Pride, mother of Surak, and grandmother of Rani and Baliyo. She passes away in "Long Live the Queen". In "Return to the Pride Lands", her ghost is seen with the ghosts of Mufasa and Askari when Kion marries Rani with his Lion Guard agreeing to help the Night Pride protect the Tree of Life.
- Binga (voiced by Fiona Riley) is a fun-loving honey badger and Bunga's love interest.

=== Villains ===
- Ushari (voiced by Christian Slater) is a short-tempered cobra who used to live in the Pride Lands and would get disturbed whenever the Lion Guard was near him. In the season 2 special The Rise of Scar, Ushari turns to villainy after being trampled by the Lion Guard one too many times and allies with Janja to resurrect Scar and take over the Pride Lands, which succeeds by the end of the special, as later on throughout season 2 and the beginning of season 3, Scar plots to reform his army to take revenge against Simba and Kion. By the end of "Battle for the Pride Lands", he bites Kion, resulting in a scar over Kion's left eye. Shortly after this, Ushari is knocked over by Bunga and falls to his death in the Outlands' volcano.
- Reirei's pack are a family pack of jackals that live in the Outlands.
  - Reirei (voiced by Ana Gasteyer) is a clever, scheming and manipulative jackal who is the matriarch of the family.
  - Goigoi (voiced by Phil LaMarr) is a lazy and dimwitted jackal who is Reirei's mate.
  - Dogo (voiced by Jacob Guenther) is a jackal pup who is one of Reirei and Goigoi's sons; he has blue eyes, while the other pups have brown eyes.
  - Dogo's Siblings (voiced by Jacob Guenther, Khary Payton, and Alex Cartañá) are a group of young or adult jackals who are Reirei and Goigoi's sons and daughter and brothers and sister of Dogo.
  - Kijana (voiced by Amber Hood) is a jackal pup who is Reirei and Goigoi's daughter and Dogo's sister.
- Makucha's Leap are a group of leopards who live in the Backlands. After hearing from Makini excitedly talking all about the Tree of Life and the rare animals, Makucha uses that info to sneakily follow the Lion Guard to the Tree of Life so that he, and later his two members, could feast on the rare animals. When they do arrive at the Tree of Life, Makucha and his allies are blown away by the Roar of the Elders.
  - Makucha (voiced by Steve Blum) is a cunning and devious cream-colored leopard from the Backlands who enjoys hunting rare animals. While he has appeared in the episodes of the series before, Makucha becomes the main antagonist of season 3 and makes a new goal, sneakily follow the Lion Guard to the Tree of Life so that he could feast on the rare animals. He gained allies along the way. When he does arrive at the Tree of Life, Makucha and his allies are blown away by the Roar of the Elders.
  - Fahari (voiced by Nolan North) is a cream-colored leopard and a member of Makucha's leap.
  - Jiona (voiced by Ace Gibson) is a cream-colored leopard and a member of Makucha's leap.
- Kiburi's Float are a group of crocodiles who were former members of Makuu's float who defied Makuu's orders and were exiled for their evil deeds.
  - Kiburi (voiced by Common) is an arrogant crocodile who is the leader of the float.
  - Tamka (voiced by Nolan North) is an overconfident and unintelligent crocodile who is a member of the float.
  - Nduli (voiced by Jorge Diaz) is an optimistic crocodile who is a member of the float.
- Shupavu's Group are a group of skinks who are friends with Ushari and serve as his spies.
  - Shupavu (voiced by Meghan Strange) is a red skink who is the leader of the group.
  - Njano (voiced by Ford Riley) is a yellow skink with a blue tongue who is second-in-command of the group.
  - Nyeusi (voiced by Dee Bradley Baker) is a stealthy black skink who is a member of the group.
  - Waza is an observant blue skink who is a member of the group.
  - Nyata is a swift purple skink who is a member of the group.
- Kenge (voiced by Kristofer Hivju) is an enormous and ferocious monitor lizard and acquaintance of Ushari who dislikes being called "little" or else it will infuriate him. His venomous bite - to everyone except Bunga - induces temporary paralysis.
- Chuluun (voiced by Kimiko Glenn) is a cunning and sneaky snow leopard. First encountered by the Lion Guard in the mountains in the episode "Ghost of the Mountain", Chuluun eventually is defeated for the first time as the Lion Guard fights back against her alongside a group of red pandas. After her defeat, she encounters Makucha and joins him to follow the Lion Guard to the Tree of Life.
- Ora's Bank are group of Komodo dragons who encountered by the Lion Guard on an island in the episode "Dragon Island", Ora and his two unnamed lackeys is eventually defeated after Kion uses the Roar to escape the island. But little do the Lion Guard know that Ora, and later on, his two lackeys, have survived and joined up with Makucha and Chuluun to follow the Lion Guard to the Tree of Life.
  - Ora (voiced by Andrew Kishino) is a ferocious Komodo dragon who is the leader of his bank.
  - Komodo Dragon (voiced by Ford Riley) is an unnamed Komodo Dragon who is one of Ora's two lackeys.
- Mama Binturong (voiced by Rachel House) is a sneaky and arrogant binturong crime boss who lives in the stone forest and enjoys eating tuliza until Bunga ruins her tuliza pile with his stink, causing Mama Binturong to chase him down with intention on finishing him. In "The River of Patience" after overhearing & noticing Chuluun's hatred towards Bunga, after she, Ora, and Makucha were defeated by the Lion Guard and the Night Pride, Mama Binturong joins them to assist them in their cause.
  - Smun (voiced by James Sie) is a porcupine, who is the leader of his prickle and a servant of Mama Binturong.

== Production ==
The series was announced by Disney on June 9, 2014, on the run-up to the first film's 20th anniversary. Disney Junior general manager Nancy Kanter stated: "It's kind of like The Lion King meets The Avengers". The series' announcement came after a meeting between Kanter and Disney chief executive Robert Iger. Iger suggested to Kanter that Disney Junior should consider producing content to celebrate the 20th anniversary of The Lion King in 2014. Disney had shown early footage to young test audiences, who were able to make suggestions, such as adjusting the look of the hyenas. Disney Consumer Products launched a line of toys to tie into the television series, as well at book titles based on the series such as Return of the Roar, Can't-Wait to be Queen, Bunga the Wise, Meet the New Guard, Fuli Finds Her Place, Join the Lion Guard!, and Kion's Animal Alphabet. A sneak peek of The Lion Guard was shown at the 2015 D23 Expo. On August 12, 2015, a sneak peek was shown, with new information that the television movie was scheduled to air in November 2015 to be titled The Lion Guard: Return of the Roar. On October 9, 2015, it was announced that Return of the Roar would premiere on November 22, 2015, on Disney Channel.

On coming up with the idea, the series' creator and executive producer Ford Riley noted that at the end of The Lion King the presentation of Simba and Nala's newborn cub is seen. In The Lion King II: Simba's Pride, it is revealed that the cub in question is Kiara and that she will be the future queen. Riley was interested in the idea of a second-born cub and what his role would be if Kiara is destined to become queen. Additionally, he was inspired by his 8-year-old son, who would visit the park with friends and pretend to be a superhero team.

Riley confirmed the timeline of the series; in Simba's Pride there is a years-long time gap, The Lion Guard takes place during the years in-between Kiara's first meeting with Kovu as a cub and her first hunt as an adult. Riley also noted the inclusion of Swahili into the series, which is used for names of characters, locations, songs, and catchphrases.

Classic mythology is used as inspiration for the show. Riley stated "We want it to feel epic and so we're trying to draw from as many epics in classical literature and classical television in addition to (The Lion King) itself". Riley noted that protecting the Circle of Life is the main theme of the series; "The animals who respect it don't eat too much, allow for the grass to grow, and larger animals to eat smaller animals. Our bad guys come from those that don't respect the Circle of Life. They just want to eat and wreak havoc."

In terms of giving The Lion Guard the same look as the original film, director Howy Parkins stated that they were mindful to keep the essence of The Lion King. To that end, the crew did extensive research on the look of the backgrounds and characters and were able to obtain some original model sheets. In addition, Barry Atkinson and Mike Surrey, background painter and supervising animator for Timon on the original film respectively, were brought in to consult with the series' background artists, animators and storyboard artists.

Speaking on the show's educational aspect, Parkins stated that research was done on animals and habitats in the Serengeti, and that this information is woven into storylines without being overt.

== Broadcast ==
Like its American counterpart, Return of the Roar premiered on November 22, 2015, on Disney Channel in Canada, while the series premiered on January 17, 2016, on Disney Junior, two days after its American premiere. In the United Kingdom and Ireland, Return of the Roar premiered on Disney Junior on February 8, 2016, while the series premiered on April 13, 2016. In Australia and New Zealand, the pilot debuted on February 6, 2016, and the series began airing on February 28, 2016, on Disney Junior. In Southeast Asia, the pilot premiered on March 20, 2016, on Disney Channel (April 11 on Disney Junior) and the series itself on April 17 on the Disney Junior block on Disney Channel.

== Reception ==
Max Nicholson from IGN gave the pilot episode score of 7.7, describing the special as "a fun-filled, if younger-skewing, hour television". He praised the pilot for introducing more of the Lion King lore, and also the animation, music, and performance of the new voice actors. However, he found Janja and his clan lacked the appeal to make a compelling villain.

Ed Power of The Daily Telegraph scored the pilot two stars out of five, labeling it a "Soggy, sentimental throwback".

Emily Ashby of Common Sense Media gave the series four out of five stars, stating "With its strong messages about courage, responsibility, and friendship, this series is a fun pick for kids, and parents who watch with their kids will enjoy seeing the original The Lion King gang -- including Timon, Pumbaa, and the eccentric Rafiki -- in cameos throughout the series".

== Home media ==
=== Region 1 DVD releases ===
Distributed by Walt Disney Studios Home Entertainment.

Title	Release date	Episodes	Additional features
The Lion Guard: Return of the Roar	February 23, 2016	Television movie	Music video of Beau Black performing "Here Comes the Lion Guard." Talking Lion Guard Backpack Clip
The Lion Guard: Unleash the Power	September 20, 2016	"Fuli's New Family" (Season 1, Episode 7); "Bunga the Wise" (Season 1, Episode 3); "Eye of the Beholder" (Season 1, Episode 5); "Follow That Hippo!" (Season 1, Episode 9); "The Search for Utamu" (Season 1, Episode 8); "Never Judge a Hyena by Its Spots" (Season 1, Episode 1)	Lion Guard Power Necklace
The Lion Guard: Life in the Pride Lands	January 10, 2017	"The Rise of Makuu" (Season 1, Episode 2); "The Kupatana Celebration" (Season 1, Episode 6); "Bunga and the King" (Season 1, Episode 13); "Never Roar Again" (Season 1, Episode 21); "The Imaginary Okapi" (Season 1, Episode 14)	Music videos: "A Trail to Hope", "Teke Ruka Teleza" It's UnBungalievable shorts Five Lion Guard Wristbands
The Lion Guard: The Rise of Scar	January 9, 2018	"The Rise of Scar" (Season 2, Episode 5/Television movie); "The Trouble With Galagos" (Season 1, Episode 16); "Janja's New Crew" (Season 1, Episode 17); "Baboons!" (Season 1, Episode 18); "Lions of the Outlands" (Season 1, Episode 20)	

=== Region 2 DVD releases ===
Distributed by Walt Disney Studios Home Entertainment.

Title	Release date	Episodes	Additional features
The Lion Guard: Return of the Roar	March 28, 2016	Television movie	Music video of Beau Black performing "Here Comes the Lion Guard." Talking Lion Guard Backpack Clip
The Lion Guard: Unleash the Power	October 3, 2016	"Fuli's New Family" (Season 1, Episode 7); "Bunga the Wise" (Season 1, Episode 3); "Eye of the Beholder" (Season 1, Episode 5); "Follow That Hippo!" (Season 1, Episode 9); "The Search for Utamu" (Season 1, Episode 8); "Never Judge a Hyena by Its Spots" (Season 1, Episode 1)	Lion Guard Power Necklace
The Lion Guard: Life in the Pride Lands	February 13, 2017	"The Rise of Makuu" (Season 1, Episode 2); "The Kupatana Celebration" (Season 1, Episode 6); "Bunga and the King" (Season 1, Episode 13); "Never Roar Again" (Season 1, Episode 21); "The Imaginary Okapi" (Season 1, Episode 14)	Music videos: "A Trail to Hope", "Teke Ruka Teleza" It's UnBungalievable shorts Five Lion Guard Wristbands
The Lion Guard: The Rise of Scar	March 5, 2018	"The Rise of Scar" (Season 2, Episode 5/Television movie); "The Trouble With Galagos" (Season 1, Episode 16); "Janja's New Crew" (Season 1, Episode 17); "Baboons!" (Season 1, Episode 18); "Lions of the Outlands" (Season 1, Episode 20)	

== Soundtrack ==
The Lion Guard (Music from the TV Series)

Soundtrack album by Various artists
- Released: January 8, 2016
- Genres: Children, Pop, Pop rock, World, Soundtrack
- Length: 34:43
- Label: Walt Disney

The Lion Guard (Music from the TV Series)
No.	Title	Performer(s)	Length
1.	"Call of the Guard (The Lion Guard Theme)"	The Lion Guard Chorus	1:03
2.	"A Beautiful Day (Ni Siku Nzuri)"	Beau Black	2:16
3.	"Zuka Zama"	Bunga	1:57
4.	"Tonight We Strike"	Janja, Mzingo & Hyenas	1:56
5.	"Kion's Lament"	Kion	3:24
6.	"Here Comes the Lion Guard"	Beau Black	2:28
7.	"We're the Same (Sisi Ni Sawa)"	Kion & Jasiri	2:33
8.	"Outta the Way"	Janja, Cheezi & Chungu	2:00
9.	"Duties of the King"	Simba & Zazu	2:01
10.	"Bunga the Wise"	Timon, Pumbaa & Bunga	1:41
11.	"My Own Way"	Fuli	2:18
12.	"Jackal Style"	Reirei	2:10
13.	"Panic and Run"	Janja, Cheezi, & Chungu	1:34
14.	"It Is Time"	Beau Black	3:01
15.	"Call of the Guard (Full Version)"	The Lion Guard Chorus	4:21
Total length:			34:43

A second soundtrack release entitled The Lion Guard: Disney Junior Music was released digitally on September 1, 2017.

== Awards and nominations ==
Year	Award	Category	Nominee	Result	Ref.
2017	NAACP Image Awards	Outstanding Children's Program	The Lion Guard	Nominated	
2017	Daytime Emmy Awards	Outstanding Original Song	Beau Black, Sarah Mirza, Ford Riley, Kevin Hopps for "Sisi Ni Sawa”	Nominated	
2018	NAACP Image Awards	Outstanding Character Voice-Over Performance – (Television or Film)	David Oyelowo	Nominated	
2020	Daytime Emmy Awards	Outstanding Original Song	Beau Black, Ford Riley, Jennifer Skelly for "As You Move Forward"	Nominated	
