= Ford Riley =

American producer and screenwriter

- Born: Stephen Ford Riley; Pittsburgh, Pennsylvania, U.S.
- Other name: Steve Riley
- Education: Tisch School of the Arts
- Occupations: Producer; screenwriter; voice actor
- Years active: 1991–present
- Spouse: Holly Marsh (m. 1995)
- Children: 2

Ford Riley is an American producer, screenwriter and voice actor. He is best known for creating the Disney Junior animated television series Special Agent Oso (2009–2012) and he most recently created and developed the animated television series The Lion Guard (2016–2019), based on Disney's 1994 film The Lion King. Riley also serves as the series' executive producer.

== Education and early career ==
Riley is a graduate of New York University Tisch School of the Arts, where he studied theater and film. He studied briefly in Prague before returning to his hometown of Pittsburgh, where he worked at the Pittsburgh Public Theater and the Heinz Endowments. He has cited his time working in Pittsburgh as being a huge motivator to pursue his own artistic endeavors.

== Writing ==
Upon relocating to Los Angeles, Riley began writing for animation in 1998, starting with Disney’s Timon & Pumbaa, followed by Recess, Teacher’s Pet and Teamo Supremo. He went on to work for Nickelodeon as a staff writer on ChalkZone and freelancer on Wow! Wow! Wubbzy!. His credits also include episodes of Megas XLR, Hi Hi Puffy AmiYumi, and Hero: 108 for Cartoon Network.

In 2004, Riley delved into animated features, writing the screenplay for the full-length animated feature Robotech: The Shadow Chronicles, based on the long-running television series Robotech.

Following Robotech, Riley developed the TV series The Land Before Time for Universal Animation Studios, based on the 1988 film by George Lucas and Steven Spielberg and its long-running series of direct-to-video features. He created that series’ first recurring villain, Red Claw (a Tyrannosaurus Rex.) In addition to overseeing the writing of every episode of the series, Riley personally wrote numerous individual episodes. He also co-wrote all of the songs for the series with Michele Brourman.

Between working on Robotech: The Shadow Chronicles and The Land Before Time, Riley developed his own series, Special Agent Oso, for Disney Junior. Special Agent Oso was originally pitched as a series of interstitials in 2004. However, during development, it was moved from the interstitial to series development track. Riley was given the green light for production of Oso in June 2007. A series of interstitials was spun off from Special Agent Oso in 2011, entitled Special Agent Oso: Three Healthy Steps.

In 2014, it was announced that Riley was developing a spin-off television series based on Disney's The Lion King film franchise for Disney Junior, entitled The Lion Guard. Riley is executive producer of both the television movie The Lion Guard: Return of the Roar, and its subsequent TV series. In addition, Riley had a minor voice role as Big Baboon in Return of the Roar, and is the voice of Njano on the series.

== Awards ==
Riley’s episode of Angela Anaconda entitled "Ice Breakers" won Le Grand Prix Anneny 2000 at the 2000 Annecy Awards for best TV Animation programme. "Ice Breakers" was also nominated for a 2000 Daytime Emmy Award in the category of Outstanding Special Class Animation Program.

The theme song that Riley co-wrote with Mike Himelstein for Special Agent Oso was nominated for a 2010 Daytime Emmy Award for Outstanding Original Song.

The song "Sisi Ni Sawa", that Riley co-wrote with Beau Black, Sarah Mirza and Kevin Hopps for The Lion Guard was nominated for a 2017 Daytime Emmy Award for Outstanding Original Song.

== Personal life ==
Riley lives in Los Angeles, California with his wife Holly (née Marsh) Riley whom he wed in 1995 and their two children, a daughter (b. 2001) and a son (b. 2003).

Riley's son was diagnosed with autism in 2005. In his 2009 interview with Emmy Magazine Riley cited his son's subsequent autism therapy as the inspiration for the curriculum for Special Agent Oso.

== Filmography ==
- Timon & Pumbaa (1998–1999) - Writer
- Angela Anaconda (1999) – Writer
- Recess (1999–2000) – Story Editor, Writer
- Teacher's Pet (2000) – Story Editor, Writer
- Teamo Supremo (2001–2003) – Story Editor, Writer
- ¡Mucha Lucha! (2002) – Writer
- ChalkZone (2003–2004) – Writer
- Higglytown Heroes (2004) – Writer
- Megas XLR (2004) – Writer
- Hi Hi Puffy AmiYumi (2004) - Writer
- Wow! Wow! Wubbzy! (2006) - Writer
- Robotech: The Shadow Chronicles (2006) - Screenplay
- The Land Before Time (2007–2008) - Developed by, Story Editor, Writer, Lyricist
- Hero: 108 (2010) - Writer
- Special Agent Oso (2009–2012) – Creator, Executive Producer, Story Editor, Writer, Lyricist
- Doc McStuffins (2014) - Writer
- The Lion Guard: Return of the Roar (2015) - Developed by, Executive Producer, Writer, Voice of Big Baboon
- The Lion Guard (2016–2019) – Creator, Developed By, Executive Producer, Story Editor, Writer, Voice of Njano, Additional voices
