= List of The Lion Guard episodes =

The Lion Guard is an American animated television series developed by Ford Riley based on Disney Animation's 1994 film The Lion King. The series was first broadcast with a television movie, titled The Lion Guard: Return of the Roar on Disney Channel on November 22, 2015 and began airing as a TV series on January 15, 2016, on Disney Junior and Disney Channel. The Lion Guard is a sequel to The Lion King and takes place during the time-gap within the 1998 film The Lion King II: Simba's Pride, with the third season taking place in parallel with the film's second act, followed by the final two episodes of Season 3 serving as a continuation to that film.

The second season premiered on July 7, 2017. A third and final season was commissioned on March 15, 2017, and premiered on August 3, 2019. The series finale aired on November 3, 2019.

== Series overview ==
Season	Episodes	Originally released	
Season	Episodes	First released	Last released
Pilot		November 22, 2015	
1	26	January 15, 2016	April 21, 2017
2	29	July 7, 2017	April 22, 2019
3	19	August 3, 2019	November 3, 2019

== Episodes ==
=== Pilot (2015) ===
Title	Directed by	Written by	Original release date	US viewers (millions)
"The Lion Guard: Return of the Roar"	Howy Parkins	Ford Riley	November 22, 2015	5.36
Kion, the second-born cub of Simba and Nala, discovers that he can channel the roars of the Great Lions of the Past, giving him fierce power just like his great uncle Scar who had the same power before him, but who misused it for evil and thus lost it forever. At the instructions of Simba and Rafiki, Kion forms a team called the Lion Guard. This team is constructed of the fiercest, strongest, bravest, fastest, and keenest of sight, Kion is the fiercest as well as the leader. As Kion goes against tradition and chooses his non-lion friends Bunga the honey badger (bravest), Ono the egret (keenest of sight), Beshte the hippopotamus (strongest), and Fuli the cheetah (fastest) to populate it, Simba feels that Kion is not taking his new responsibilities seriously and scolds him. When the guard save Kion's sister Kiara from a herd of stampeding gazelle and defeats a hyena clan led by Janja, Simba realizes that Kion has protected the Pride Lands and is indeed ready to lead his new Lion Guard. Songs: "A Beautiful Day (Ni Siku Nzuri)" sung by "The Lion Guard" chorus, "Zuka Zama" sung by Bunga, "Tonight We Strike" sung by Janja, Mzingo, and the Hyenas, and "Kion's Lament" sung by Kion

=== Season 1 (2016–17) ===
No. overall	No. in season	Title	Directed by	Written by	Original release date	Prod. code	US viewers (millions)
1	1	"Never Judge a Hyena by Its Spots"	Howy Parkins	Kevin Hopps, John Loy, Ford Riley	January 15, 2016	105	1.28
When Kion winds up in the Outlands after falling in a river, he meets Jasiri, a friendly hyena who guides him to Flat Ridge Rock to regroup with the rest of the Lion Guard and explains how she and her clan respect the Circle of Life. When Jasiri gets cornered by Janja and his clan, Kion helps her fight them off. Meanwhile, the rest of the Guard struggle to find directions to Flat Ridge Rock. "Song": "We're the Same (Sisi Ni Sawa)" sung by Kion and Jasiri
2	2	"The Rise of Makuu"	Howy Parkins	Ford Riley	January 15, 2016	103	1.28
When Makuu wins a Mashidano duel against Pua and becomes the leader of the local crocodile float and invades hippo territory, chaos ensues for the Pride Lands. Kion is torn between fighting and surrendering and struggles to find a middle path to stand his ground to resolve the situation. Meanwhile, Ono tries to find a way to free Bunga from his stinky smell. "Song": "Don't Make a Stink" sung by Ono, Timon, Pumbaa, and Bunga
3	3	"Bunga the Wise"	Howy Parkins	John Loy	January 22, 2016	104	1.48
Due to a misunderstanding with Rafiki about the wisdom of honey badgers following Bunga averting a flood, the animals of the Pride Lands begin to think that Bunga is the wisest animal there is, but when his advice begins to cause more harm than good, Kion and the others must find some way to stop Bunga before it is too late. Song: "Bunga the Wise" sung by Timon, Pumbaa, and Bunga and "Make Way for Bunga the Wise" sung by Timon, Pumbaa, Thurston, Shingo, Mbuni & other Pride Landers
4	4	"Can't Wait to be Queen"	Howy Parkins	Jack Monaco, John Loy, Ford Riley	January 29, 2016	106	1.46
Simba leaves Kiara in charge of the Pride Lands while he, Nala, and Zazu go to Kilio Valley to attend a funeral for an old elephant friend named Amanifu who has just died. Upon learning this from Mzingo, Janja decides to take advantage of Kiara's inexperience and comes up with a plan to take over the Pride Lands. Meanwhile, Simba is nervous about performing his eulogy in front of the elephants, including Amanifu's daughter, Ma Tembo. Song: "Duties of the King" sung by Simba and Zazu
5	5	"Eye of the Beholder"	Howy Parkins	Jack Monaco, John Loy, Ford Riley	February 5, 2016	107	1.42
While helping the Lion Guard drive away Janja's clan following their attempted attack on a wildebeest herd, Ono temporarily loses his vision in his left eye when he gets dirt in it. When Janja overhears the news from Mzingo and the vultures, he plans to take advantage of this by trapping the Lion Guard between two rockslides in a narrow ravine with Cheezi and Chungu's help. Meanwhile, Rafiki tries to work on his paintings of the Lion Guard. Song: "Outta the Way" sung by Janja, Cheezi, and Chungu
6	6	"The Kupatana Celebration"	Howy Parkins	Elise Allen, John Loy, Ford Riley	February 12, 2016	108	1.77
During the celebrated holiday of Kupatana in the Pride Lands, Kion and his friends rescue a jackal pup named Dogo from Janja's clan, but they soon discover that he is in a whole family of jackals and the matriarch, Reirei, and her husband Goigoi, manage to fool the Lion Guard into letting them stay. Songs: "Kupatana Community" sung by Twiga the giraffe, Mbuni the ostrich, Mtoto the elephant's Mom, and Muhanga the aardvark and "Jackal Style" sung by Reirei
7	7	"Fuli's New Family"	Howy Parkins	Elise Allen, John Loy, Ford Riley	February 19, 2016	109	1.50
The guard feel as though Fuli has no family and invites her to join their activities, oblivious to the fact that she enjoys being alone. Meanwhile, Bunga lets immunity go to his head after being told that he is immune to Ushari the cobra's venom, and goes to the Outlands to play in a volcano, where he is targeted by Janja and his clan. Song: "My Own Way" sung by Fuli
8	8	"The Search for Utamu"	Howy Parkins	Elise Allen, John Loy, Ford Riley	February 26, 2016	110	1.26
Bunga, Kion, Ono, and Beshte search for Utamu grubs. On the way, Bunga tells the story of how he met Timon and Pumbaa. Meanwhile, Fuli goes on a mission alone to stop the oryxes' fighting to save the duck flocks' eggs from being trampled, and overexerts herself, leaving her vulnerable to an attack by Mzingo's flock of vultures. Songs: "Utamu" sung by Bunga, Timon, and Pumbaa and "All Hail the Vultures" sung by Mzingo and the vultures
9	9	"Follow That Hippo!"	Howy Parkins	John Loy	April 8, 2016	111	1.19
While the Lion Guard practice their training skills, a young elephant named Mtoto idolizes Beshte. Soon, Mtoto sees Beshte in action when both of them are attacked by Janja, Cheezi, and Chungu, and later crocodiles. Song: "Hero Inside" sung by Beshte
10	10	"The Call of the Drongo"	Howy Parkins	Story by : Elise Allen; Teleplay by : Kevin Hopps	April 15, 2016	112	1.97
The Lion Guard get confused when Janja, Makuu, and Goigoi try to scare the other animals and steal their food until they discover the real culprit, Tamaa the drongo bird, who uses his talent to imitate the voice of any animal to gain food from others, which annoys the Lion Guard for false alarms. Tamaa promises not to use his voices for his benefit again but soon finds himself forced by Janja's clan to help them trap a herd of impalas in the Outlands. Song: "Bird of a Thousand Voices" sung by Tamaa
11	11	"Paintings and Predictions"	Howy Parkins	Story by : Elise Allen; Teleplay by : Kevin Hopps	April 22, 2016	113	1.42
During a rainstorm, Bunga thinks that Rafiki's paintings can predict the future after watching a painting of some zebras run towards a rock formation, narrowly missing the top rock as they run towards it and believes that Kion will fall from a high tree. Soon, he and the rest of the Lion Guard try to keep Kion from climbing trees. Meanwhile, Janja, Cheezi, and Chungu plan an attack on Thurston's zebra herd. Song: "Panic and Run" sung by Janja, Cheezi, and Chungu
12	12	"The Mbali Fields Migration"	Howy Parkins	Elise Allen, John Loy, Ford Riley	April 29, 2016	114	1.38
Under the suggestion of Simba, the Lion Guard lead a herd of zebras led by Muhimu and a herd of gazelles led by Swala to a new grazing ground located at the edge of the Pride Lands in Mbali Fields. One of the obstacles during their journey is passing through the Outlands while avoiding Janja's clan, which becomes complicated when Muhimu starts to have a baby. Song: "A Trail to Hope" sung by The Lion Guard chorus
13	13	"Bunga and the King"	Howy Parkins	Jack Monaco	May 6, 2016	115	1.53
When Simba and Bunga get trapped in a large sinkhole, the Lion Guard struggle to find a way to rescue them so that the Royal Family can go to Ma Tembo's elephant concert. While in the hole, Simba and Bunga find a tunnel that leads to Nandembo Caverns, and the Lion Guard head to the cavern entrance along with Timon and Pumbaa in the hopes of meeting them inside. Meanwhile, Simba and Bunga realize that being raised by Timon and Pumbaa is something that they have in common. Song: "Hakuna Matata" sung by Simba, Kion, Nala, Kiara, Timon, Pumbaa, and The Lion Guard
14	14	"The Imaginary Okapi"	Howy Parkins	John Loy	July 8, 2016	117	1.37
Beshte makes friends with a timid okapi named Ajabu who has traveled to the Pride Lands to get away from Makucha the leopard, but the other members of the Lion Guard think that Ajabu is imaginary due to his tendency to hide from others. When Makucha shows up in the Pride Lands, however, the guard soon realize that Beshte's new friend is real and rushes off to help Ajabu. Song: "Life in the Pride Lands" sung by Beshte and Ajabu
15	15	"Too Many Termites"	Howy Parkins	Elise Allen	July 15, 2016	118	0.97
While the Lion Guard is on night patrol, they mistake a pack of aardwolves for hyenas. Kion Roars at them which sends them flying into the Outlands and causes a massive termite infestation in the Pride Lands. The Lion Guard soon realize their mistake and travel to the Outlands to bring the aardwolves back. However, Reirei and Goigoi have their sights on the aardwolves as well. Song: "We'll Make You a Meal" sung by Reirei, Goigoi, and the Aardwolves
16	16	"The Trouble With Galagos"	Howy Parkins	Elise Allen	August 5, 2016	119	1.21
The Lion Guard discovers from Laini and her group of galagos that a leopard named Badili has moved into their tree. They find out that Badili has been driven out of his home by the mean leopard Mapigano who has taken over his territory in Mirihi Forest in the Back Lands. Kion and the Lion Guard scare Mapingano away, but the next day, the Galagos tell them that Badili has returned to their tree, due to Mapingano returning. The guard then teaches Badili to stand up to Mapigano and reclaim his territory. Song: "Find Your Roar" sung by "The Lion Guard" chorus
17	17	"Janja's New Crew"	Howy Parkins	Kevin Hopps	August 26, 2016	120	1.40
After a failed attack on a wildebeest herd, Janja kicks Cheezi and Chungu out of the Outlands and promotes Nne and Tano to be his seconds-in-command. While the Lion Guard makes sure that the Pride Lands' trails are safe after a big rainstorm, they find Cheezi and Chungu and reluctantly let them stay. Meanwhile, Nne and Tano plan an attack on an oryx herd and ditch Janja. "Song": "Chungu's Lament" sung by Chungu
18	18	"Baboons!"	Howy Parkins	Kevin Hopps, Jack Monaco	September 23, 2016	121	1.32
The Lion Guard rescues a baby baboon and Fuli is tasked with returning the baboon to its mother on Mapango Cliffs. Along the way, she has to avoid Mzingo's flock of vultures. Meanwhile, Kiara, Tiifu, and Zuri get trapped on an island after a flood. The Lion Guard helps rescue them in time for Kiara to preside over the buffalo herd's Royal Buffalo Wallow led by Vuruga Vuruga. Song: "Baboons" sung by Fuli
19	19	"Beware the Zimwi"	Howy Parkins	Jack Monaco	October 14, 2016	122	1.27
Rafiki tells a story to the Lion Guard and some young animals about a terrifying beast called the Zimwi. Kion does not believe that such a creature exists, but when Mtoto and his friends claim to have seen it, the guard searches the Pride Lands to find out the truth. Song: "Beware of the Zimwi" sung by Rafiki
20	20	"Lions of the Outlands"	Howy Parkins, Tom Derosier	Kevin Hopps, Ford Riley, John Loy	November 11, 2016	123	1.46
Jasiri asks for Kion's help in dealing with a pride of lions who are keeping her family away from their watering hole, including her sister Madoa and two cubs named Tunu and Wema. When he goes to help them out, he encounters, Kovu, Nuka, Vitani, the Outsider lions, and their leader Zira, who tries to get Kion to join her side by stating that she knows more about the Roar of the Elders than he does, such as its ability to bring a brief rain shower by roaring at a cloud. Zira eventually reveals to Kion that she knew Scar. When Kion refuses to join Zira, she and her lionesses trap him. Meanwhile, the rest of the guard head to the Outlands to rescue Kion after Rafiki informs them of who the Outsider lions are. Song: "Lions Over All" sung by Zira and Kion
21	21	"Never Roar Again"	Howy Parkins	Jack Monaco	November 18, 2016	116	1.19
Kion uses the Roar of the Elders in anger when Janja's clan attack Nala. As a result, Kion loses control of the Roar and its power almost harms her. Worried that he nearly hurt his mother, Kion feels that he should never use the Roar again. Meanwhile, Ono feels self–conscious after the Roar blows off his head feathers. Overhearing Kion's plans to never use the Roar again, Makuu and his float of crocodiles take advantage of the opportunity and take over the Flood Plains. With some convincing from Mufasa and Nala, Kion gains the confidence to use the Roar when he confronts Makuu. Song: "Stand Up, Stand Out" sung by Bunga, Beshte, and Fuli
22	22	"The Lost Gorillas"	Howy Parkins, Tom Derosier	Elise Allen	December 2, 2016	127	1.03
The Lion Guard encounters two gorilla princes named Majinuni and Hafifu who have a message for Simba on behalf of their father King Sokwe of the Theluji Mountains. However, the gorilla brothers have forgotten the message. Simba explains to Kion that every wet season, Sokwe gives Simba a message to let him know if their peace treaty still stands. The guard goes back to the mountain to get the message from the gorilla brothers, who are reluctant to face their father. On the way, Kion, Bunga, Fuli, Ono, and Beshte experience snow for the first time. Song: "Kuishi Ni Kucheka" sung by The Lion Guard chorus
23	23	"The Trail to Udugu"	Howy Parkins, Tom Derosier	Teleplay by : Elise Allen; S/T : Kendall Michele Haney	January 6, 2017	125	0.79
Nala takes Kion and Kiara on a special trip to find Udugu. With Kion away, Simba leads the Lion Guard to help both Mbuni's ostrich flock and Swala's gazelle herd. When Simba orders the guard to follow his command, they make matters worse. Meanwhile, Nala disappears and Kion and Kiara have to work together to find her. Afterward, Nala reveals that Udugu is not a place but a word that means "kinship" or the bond between siblings, and Simba learns that the Lion Guard works best not when they do exactly what he does but doing what they each do best. Song: "Running With the King" sung by Bunga
24	24	"Ono's Idol"	Howy Parkins	Jack Monaco	February 24, 2017	126	1.05
When the legendary eagle named Hadithi comes to the Pride Lands, Ono discovers that his hero is not what he seems when it turned out that he made up some of his adventures. While the Lion Guard searches for leaves from the top of the tallest tree in the Pride Lands for Hadithi's Royal Mud Print ceremony, Janja, Cheezi, and Chungu target a group of klipspringers. Song: "Hadithi the Hero" sung by Hadithi
25	25	"Beshte and the Hippo Lanes"	Howy Parkins	Story by : John Loy; Teleplay by : Chelsea Beyl and Jack Monaco	March 17, 2017	124	1.17
When Beshte's dad Basi gets injured saving a frightened rhino calf while creating hippo lanes in the flood plains after a big rainstorm, Beshte must step up and make the hippo lanes instead. Meanwhile, Kion, Bunga, Ono, and Fuli lead a herd of stubborn antelope led by Bupu to higher ground, and the guard must help Basi before Makuu’s float try to take over the Flood Plains. Song: "Makin' Hippo Lanes" sung by Beshte
26	26	"Ono the Tickbird"	Howy Parkins	Elise Allen	April 21, 2017	128	1.02
Ono acts as a replacement for Kifaru the rhino's tick bird Mwenzi to guide him to Tamasha, a sparring event at Lake Matope after Kifaru and Mwenzi have a falling out. Meanwhile, the other members of the Lion Guard track down the tick bird and convince him to work out his differences with Kifaru. During a confrontation at a lake, Kifaru and Mwenzi must put aside their differences to help the Lion Guard fight off Makuu's float. Song: "Tickbirds and Rhinos" sung by Kifaru and Mwenzi

=== Season 2 (2017–19) ===
No. overall	No. in season	Title	Directed by	Written by	Original release date	Prod. code	US viewers (millions)
27	1	"Babysitter Bunga"	Howy Parkins	Elise Allen	July 7, 2017	201	1.02
Muhimu asks Bunga to watch over her son Hamu while she takes some time out to relax. Before long, some of the other animals ask Bunga to watch their kids as well. While doing so, Bunga has to work hard to keep them safe from Reirei's Pack, including Dogo and Kijana. Meanwhile, Goigoi tries to keep the Lion Guard from going to Hakuna Matata Falls to see how Bunga is getting on. Song: "Teke Ruka Teleza" sung by Bunga
28	2	"The Savannah Summit"	Howy Parkins, Tom Derosier	Jack Monaco	July 7, 2017	202	1.04
Simba gathers key leaders of the Pride Lands' different animal communities for the Savannah Summit in order to make arrangements for the upcoming dry season. The Lion Guard gets suspicious when Makuu is one of the attendees and suspects that he might ruin the summit. Meanwhile, Makuu butts head with Bupu when Makuu wants to have his float sleep near his herd's watering hole during the dry season. Eventually, Kion realizes that Makuu wants to change from his trouble-making ways in order to become a better leader for his float and the Pride Lands. Song: "Everyone is Welcome" sung by Simba and Zazu
29	3	"The Traveling Baboon Show"	Howy Parkins	John Loy	July 14, 2017	208	1.06
When the Traveling Baboon Show led by Uroho arrives in the Pride Lands to perform their show, they end up stealing the other animals' food. After chasing the baboons to the Outlands, the Lion Guard has to come to their rescue when they are cornered by Janja, Cheezi, and Chungu. Song: "The Traveling Baboon Show" sung by Uroho
30	4	"Ono and the Egg"	Howy Parkins, Tom Derosier	Elise Allen	July 21, 2017	209	0.95
Ono becomes the protector of the egg that belongs to the hamerkop Kulinda when a hawk named Mpishi leaves her hunting territory and comes to the Pride Lands to look for new food to try. When the egg hatches, Ono and the Lion Guard must keep the hamerkop chick safe from Mpishi, who has assisted Mwoga the vulture to help her catch a meal. Song: "A Real Meal" sung by Mpishi and Mwoga
31	5	"The Rise of Scar"	Howy Parkins	Ford Riley	July 29, 2017	205	1.38
As the dry season begins, Ma Tembo works to find a new water source, and Rafiki takes in a young mandrill named Makini as an apprentice. While fed up with always getting trampled and disturbed when the Lion Guard is near, Ushari the Egyptian cobra inadvertently finds out that Kion talks to the spirit of Mufasa. When ambushed by Janja's clan, Ushari forms an alliance with them, and they conspire to find a way to summon the spirit of Scar. While overhearing Rafiki, Ushari learns that the evil lions of the past appear in the flames of fire, and once they are summoned by the Roar of the Elders, a bakora staff can be used to talk to them. With this knowledge, Janja, Cheezi, Chungu, Nne, and Tano steal Makini's bakora staff and kidnap Kiara to lure Kion and the Guard to the Outlands, with the intent of tricking Kion to Roar with enough power to make the hyenas' volcano erupt in flames. After the Guard manages to save Kiara, Janja taunts Kion until he Roars in anger and unknowingly summons Scar when the volcano erupts. Ushari and Janja's clan are then able to speak with Scar's spirit in the volcano after Janja drops the bakora staff into it. Meanwhile, the Lion Guard and Kiara return to the Pride Lands safely and find a new water source for Ma Tembo, but are unaware that Scar has returned. Songs: "Fujo" sung by The Lion Guard chorus, "Path of Honor" sung by Simba and Kion, "Bring Back a Legend" sung by Janja, Ushari, and the Hyenas, and "Today Is My Day" sung by Makini Note: Hour-long movie.
32	6	"Let Sleeping Crocs Lie"	Howy Parkins	Elise Allen	August 11, 2017	207	1.03
After the Lion Guard accidentally awakens Makuu and his float from their sleep during the dry season upon unknowingly sending a stampede near their sleeping cave, the Lion Guard and Simba work to find a new place for Makuu's float to endure the dry season. During this time, a crocodile named Kiburi conspires against Makuu which leads to them getting into a Mashidano as Ushari, under Scar's orders, persuades Kiburi to have his followers attack Simba. After he and his followers are kicked out of Makuu's float upon Kiburi losing the Mashidano, and banished from the Pride Lands upon the attack on Simba being thwarted by the Lion Guard, Kiburi joins Janja's clan and Ushari in working for Scar, who plans to unite all the animals of the Outlands and get them under his leadership as part of his plot to take over the Pride Lands. Song: "I Have a Plan" sung by Scar, Ushari, and Janja
33	7	"Swept Away"	Howy Parkins, Tom Derosier	Jack Monaco	September 15, 2017	210	0.68
While working to free Thurston's zebra herd from the dry river before the mud hardens, Kion has no choice but to use the Roar on a dark cloud to make it rain. The rain from the cloud not only frees Thurston's herd, but it also causes a flash flood that sends Beshte into the Outlands. After Njano informs Ushari of Beshte's presence, Scar enlists Janja, Cheezi, and Chungu to assist Shupavu's group of skinks in laying a trap to get rid of Beshte at Rocky Plateau. Meanwhile, the rest of the Lion Guard head to the Outlands to search for Beshte. Song: "Gotta Look on the Bright Side" sung by Beshte
34	8	"Rafiki's New Neighbors"	Howy Parkins	Teleplay by : Krista Tucker; S/T : Laura Sreenby	September 22, 2017	TBA	0.60
As Rafiki gets Makini ready to paint for Simba's family, he gets disturbed by the antics of three young animals; elephant Chama (who was formerly a part of Ma Tembo's herd), antelope Mzaha (who was formerly a part of Bupu's herd), and monkey Furaha (who was formerly a part of Tumbili's troop). Meanwhile, the Lion Guard works to keep the animals of the Pride Lands safe from the threat of dry lightning. When the fire from the dry lightning threatens Rafiki's tree, Chama, Mzaha, and Furaha save Rafiki and Makini and work with the Lion Guard to put out the fire. Song: "Three of a Kind" sung by The Lion Guard chorus
35	9	"Rescue in the Outlands"	Howy Parkins, Tom Derosier	Elise Allen	September 29, 2017	TBA	0.58
The tsetse flies have been causing problems in the Pride Lands. Due to the Tsetse flies' dislike of zebra stripes, the Lion Guard escorts Thurston's herd and Mbeya the rhino to a source of water. Meanwhile, Scar instructs Janja's clan to get rid of Jasiri, as she is an ally of the Lion Guard and interfering in the plans to get Reirei's pack on their side. Janja's clan ends up trapping Jasiri and her clan's cubs, Tunu and Wema, in a steam vent. This causes her sister Madoa to enlist the Lion Guard to help rescue Jasiri, Tunu, and Wema, with the unlikely help of Thurston. Song: "Worst Hyena We Know" sung by Janja, Cheezi, and Chungu
36	10	"The Ukumbusho Tradition"	Howy Parkins	Jack Monaco	October 27, 2017	TBA	0.59
The Ukumbusho, a performance that celebrates the friendship between the elephants and lions of the Pride Lands is being held in Mizimu Grove, and Makini is tasked with painting sunbursts on the elephants. The Lion Guard plays the original Guard which was led by a lion named Askari. As Ma Tembo states that the Guard was made up of lions at the last Ukumbusho, Makini paints Bunga, Fuli, Beshte, and Ono to look like lions while Timon and Pumbaa help them in practicing their performance. Due to Makini using yellow flowers for the elephants' sunburst paint, a swarm of bees starts swarming Ma Tembo and the other elephants causing them to go on a rampage. The Lion Guard then rushes after the elephants to calm them down and save them from the bees. Song: "May There Be Peace" sung by Kion, Bunga, Fuli, Beshte, and Ono
37	11	"The Bite of Kenge"	Howy Parkins	Krista Tucker	November 3, 2017	213	0.58
When Janja, Cheezi, and Chungu target the Tikiti melons which hold water that the elephants need during the dry season, Scar orders Ushari to enlist his monitor lizard friend named Kenge to deal with the Lion Guard. His venomous bite temporarily paralyzes Kion, Fuli, and Beshte, causing Ono to enlist Makini to find a remedy to heal them faster while Rafiki is away. While Makini gets Ponya flowers for the remedy, Ono and Bunga are left to defend the Tikiti melons from Kenge and Janja's clan. Song: "Big Bad Kenge" sung by Ushari
38	12	"Timon and Pumbaa's Christmas"	Howy Parkins	Story by : Krista Tucker; S/T : Ford Riley and John Loy	December 8, 2017	221	0.66
Rafiki tells Makini the story of how Timon and Pumbaa introduced Christmas to the Pride Lands during the time of year when a large star shines day and night. In order for Dandy Claws to deliver presents to Timon and Pumbaa, Bunga enlists the rest of the Lion Guard and the rest of the animals in the Pride Lands to help perform "The Twelve Ways of Christmas" by obtaining the different things and animals for the song by Christmas morning. Songs: "Christmas in the Pride Lands" sung by Bunga, Timon, and Pumbaa, "The Twelve Ways of Christmas" sung by Bunga, Kion, Ono, Fuli, and Beshte
39	13	"The Morning Report"	Howy Parkins, Tom Derosier	Jack Monaco	January 8, 2018	TBA	0.68
Under Scar's orders, Janja, Cheezi, and Chungu kidnap Zazu while he is compiling the Morning Report, and take him to the Outlands to get him to reveal royal secrets about Simba. After Kion reminisces about how Zazu once saved him and Bunga from Makuu and Pua's crocodile float when he was a little cub, the Lion Guard finds out that Zazu has been kidnapped by Janja's clan and heads to the Outlands to save him. Song: "I Do Have a Great Deal to Say" sung by Zazu
40	14	"The Golden Zebra"	Howy Parkins	Elise Allen	January 9, 2018	216	0.57
When there is a water shortage in the Pride Lands, Simba instructs the Lion Guard to travel to the Back Lands to find the zebra leader Dhahabu and ask her if she is willing to share her herd's watering hole with the Pride Lands' animals. When they find Dhahabu and her herd they discover that she is a rare golden zebra. Along the way, they have to face Makucha, who he and his leap of leopards are preventing the zebras from getting their water source. Song: "Fabulous Dhahabu" sung by Raha, Starehe, Dhahabu, and the Zebras
41	15	"The Little Guy"	Howy Parkins, Tom Derosier	Gus Constantellis	January 10, 2018	217	0.63
A gecko named Hodari wants to be in a crocodile float, but Makuu does not want Hodari in his float due to his size. Witnessing this happening, Shupavu and Njano get Hodari to be part of Kiburi's float. Once Hodari joins the float, Kiburi then comes up with a plan to use Hodari to find out all of Makuu's fighting moves and to get past the Lion Guard. Song: "Give a Little Guy a Chance" sung by Hodari
42	16	"Divide and Conquer"	Howy Parkins, Tom Derosier	John Loy	January 11, 2018	TBA	0.59
After Scar obtains the alliance with Reirei's pack, they work with Janja's clan to cause two different attacks in the Pride Lands at the same time, forcing the Lion Guard to split up to chase them down. In order to be in two places at once and to fool both Reirei and Janja's groups, Kion enlists the help of Tamaa to imitate the Guard's voices. Meanwhile, Scar orders Janja's clan to take down Rafiki while Reirei's pack causes a distraction elsewhere. The Guard realizes that Janja's clan is heading towards Rafiki and send Tamaa to confuse Reirei's pack while they go to assist Rafiki in fighting the hyenas. However, the jackals soon find out that Tamaa is tricking them and rush off to help the hyenas. During the battle, Scar appears in the flames of a nearby fire and speaks with Janja. Kion briefly witnesses Scar's spirit before it vanishes, but is unsure of what to make of it. With the help of Tamaa and Rafiki, the Guard wins the battle and Janja and Reirei retreat with their groups. In the area where Scar appeared, a scorch mark with a symbol remains. Rafiki recognizes it from the paintings of the past as a sign of evil and goes off to consult the paintings to be sure. Song: "We're the Smartest" sung by Janja, Reirei, the Jackals, and the Hyenas
43	17	"The Scorpion's Sting"	Howy Parkins, Tom Derosier	Krista Tucker	April 2, 2018	222	0.75
During the Kumbuka celebration honoring the day that Simba defeated Scar, a scorpion named Sumu sent by Scar stings Simba, causing him to become very ill. Rafiki sends Makini and the Lion Guard to the Outlands' volcano to get the volcanic ash needed to cure Simba by sundown. Once Makini and the guard reach the volcano, Scar reveals himself to them and commands Janja's clan, Reirei's pack, Kiburi's float, Mzingo's flock, Ushari, Kenge, and Shupavu's group to attack them. After battling Scar's army of Outlanders with Kion's Roar of the Elders, Makini and the Lion Guard make it back in time to Pride Rock with the ash. While Simba is recuperating, Kion informs Rafiki that Scar has returned. Song: "Good King Simba" sung by Rafiki and the Pride Landers
44	18	"The Wisdom of Kongwe"	Howy Parkins	Jack Monaco	April 3, 2018	218	0.69
Seeking advice on how to defeat Scar, Simba and Rafiki send Makini and Fuli to Urembo River to escort Kongwe, a wise old tortoise, to Pride Rock. Along the way, Fuli becomes frustrated with Kongwe's need to stop and observe things. However, when they have to take a detour through the Back Lands, Fuli ends up taking Kongwe's advice on how to deal with Makucha. Meanwhile, Kion, Bunga, Ono, and Beshte patrol the Pride Lands and save some elands from wildfire. Song: "The Faster I Go, The More That I See" sung by Fuli
45	19	"The Kilio Valley Fire"	Howy Parkins	Elise Allen	April 4, 2018	TBA	0.62
Scar has Janja's clan, Reirei's pack, Kiburi's float, and Mzingo's flock set fire to Kilio Valley, the home of Ma Tembo's herd, and ambush them while the Lion Guard is working to extinguish the flames. The guard has no choice but to ignore the fire in order to get the elephants to safety, resulting in the valley burning down. While Kion struggles to find Ma Tembo's herd a new home someplace else in the Pride Lands, Scar orders Janja, Reirei, Kiburi, and Mzingo's groups to remain in what is left of Kilio Valley as part of his plan to take over the Pride Lands piece by piece. Meanwhile, after some advice from Mufasa, Kion tasks the elephants to help save Laini and her group of Galagos home Ndefu Grove when it catches fire. Song: "I'm Gonna Run This Dump" sung by Janja, Reirei, and Mzingo
46	20	"Undercover Kinyonga"	Howy Parkins	Don Gillies	April 5, 2018	TBA	0.72
After Ono has trouble infiltrating the Outlands without being detected by Mzingo's flock, the Lion Guard meets a chameleon named Kinyonga who offers to spy on Scar in the Outlands due to her ability to camouflage. She overhears Scar ordering Janja's clan to block the river above Hakuna Matata Falls to prevent the Pride Lands from receiving a major water source. Kinyonga ends up getting seen and is chased through the Outlands by Shupavu's group of skinks. However, the Lion Guard sneaks into the Outlands and saves her by taking inspiration from her camouflage abilities, which they also use to surprise Janja's clan and stop them from carrying out Scar's plan. Song: "Now You See Me, Now You Don't" sung by Kinyonga
47	21	"Cave of Secrets"	Howy Parkins, Tom Derosier	Jack Monaco	September 4, 2018	TBA	0.60
Wondering how to defeat Scar, Makini and the Lion Guard find a secret tunnel deep inside their lair. According to paintings of the past that depict the original guard led by Askari, the secret to defeating great evil is hidden inside. Along the way, each member of the guard is put through a dangerous test to prove their worthiness. At the end of their journey, they realize that Askari's original Lion Guard was the secret, and by going through their tests they discover that they together, as the current Lion Guard, are the force that will defeat Scar. Song: "Wisdom on the Walls" sung by Makini
48	22	"The Zebra Mastermind"	Howy Parkins	John Loy, Don Gillies	September 5, 2018	TBA	0.44
After hearing Thurston bragging to his herd that he gives advice to the Lion Guard, Cheezi and Chungu take him to the Outlands to impress Janja and Scar. Once they are in the Outlands, Thurston inadvertently provides them with wrong information and convinces them that the Lion Guard's weakness are red flowers. Soon, Thurston gives Goigoi, Tamka, and Nduli some poor advice on how to weaken the Lion Guard as well. Meanwhile, the Lion Guard patrols the Pride Lands to keep other animals safe from dust devils. Song: "The Zebra Mastermind" sung by Thurston and the Zebras
49	23	"The Hyena Resistance"	Howy Parkins, Tom Derosier	Kendall Michele Haney	September 6, 2018	226	0.46
When Kion tells Jasiri that Scar has returned, she forms a hyena resistance with her clan to help the Lion Guard by informing them of Scar's plans and stopping Janja's clan, Reirei's pack, and Kiburi's float before they can get to the Pride Lands. Following fights at Mzimu Grove, Big Springs, and Okute Woods, Shupavu and Njano hear about the hyena resistance and inform Scar of its existence. This allows Janja, Reirei, and Kiburi's groups to get the drop on the hyena resistance and ambush them. Ono informs the rest of the guard of the situation and they help Jasiri's clan fight them off. During the fight, Janja falls into a steam vent upon being accidentally knocked in by one of Kiburi's crocodiles, while his clan, Reirei's pack, and Kiburi's float are blown away by Kion's Roar of the Elders. Jasiri pulls Janja out of the steam vent and tells him that he and his clan are welcome to join the resistance to help defeat Scar. After some hesitation, Janja dismisses her offer and runs off, but Jasiri remains hopeful that he will come around. Choosing to stay in the Outlands as it is their home, Jasiri tells Kion that she and her clan will continue to help defend against Scar. Song: "Kwetu Ni Kwetu" sung by Jasiri and the Hyenas
50	24	"The Underground Adventure"	Howy Parkins	Elise Allen	September 7, 2018	227	0.44
While Kion, Bunga, Kiara, Tiifu, and Zuri are at the mud pots at the edge of the Pride Lands, Scar has Mzingo set fire to the area upon being informed by Shupavu and Njano. Seeking shelter from the fire, the five of them head into Muhangus the aardvark's den, and underground where they meet Kuchimba the mole. Kuchimba points them in the direction of Pride Rock and helps Tiifu get over her fear of the dark. Eventually, Kion, Bunga, Kiara, Tiifu, and Zuri run into Thurston, who has found himself underground as well. They are soon able to track down Muhangus and get him to help them find a way back to the surface. Tiifu ultimately becomes friends with Thurston and helps him get over his fear of the dark using what she learned from Kuchimba. Song: "Nothin' to Fear Down Here" sung by Kuchimba
51	25	"Beshte and the Beast"	Howy Parkins, Tom Derosier	Elise Allen	November 12, 2018	228	0.74
A large and strong gorilla named Shujaa is sent to the Pride Lands by King Sokwe to assist the Lion Guard in their big fight against the villainous Outlanders. However, while fighting off against Janja's clan, Reirei's pack, and Kiburi's float, Shujaa ends up damaging the Pride Lands due to being unaware of his own strength, much to Scar's delight, so Beshte helps Shujaa by teaching him to think before he acts. But when Beshte gets his leg hurt while helping the Lion Guard defend Basi's pod of hippos against Janja's clan, Reirei's pack, and Kiburi's float, Shujaa comes to his aid and helps the Lion Guard defeat the Outlanders. With that taken care of, Shujaa promises that if the Lion Guard ever needs him, he will be there and returns to his home. Song: "Shujaa Ponda" sung by Shujaa and "Shujaa Ponda Reprise" sung by Shujaa
52	26	"Pride Landers Unite!"	Howy Parkins	Jack Monaco	January 21, 2019	229	0.67
Kion gathers Ma Tembo's herd, Bupu's herd, Laini's group, and Mbeya's crash to prepare them in their fight against the villainous Outlanders. After the training does not go well, Kion asks Makuu to help train the Pride Landers, but Makuu soon becomes frustrated and abandons them. When Scar hears the news from the skinks, he orders Janja's clan, Reirei's pack, and Kiburi's float to attack Makuu's float at their watering hole, but the Pride Landers are determined to help Makuu and his float and follow the Lion Guard to help them. Song: "Pride Landers Unite" sung by The Lion Guard chorus
53	27	"The Queen's Visit"	Howy Parkins, Tom Derosier	Don Gillies, John Loy	February 18, 2019	230	0.75
Dhahabu and her herd of zebras visit from the Back Lands to promote a treaty with Simba for the Pride Landers' use of their watering hole during the dry season. Kiara, Tiifu, and Zuri give Dhahabu a tour of the Pride Lands but are threatened by a big fire, leaving the Lion Guard to rescue them, and for Dhahabu to have Fuli be her guard until her visit is done. However, Scar orders Reirei's Pack to take down Dhahabu. Meanwhile, Raha and Starehe want to be by their leader's side and do everything they can to help by taking on Goigoi on the first attack and the second attack with Reirei's Pack and Kiburi's float members at a watering hole. Song: "Prance With Me" sung by Dhahabu, Raha, Starehe, the Zebras, and the Pride Landers
54	28	"The Fall of Mizimu Grove"	Howy Parkins	Kendall Michele Haney	March 25, 2019	231	0.49
While the Pride Landers are on edge due to the recent Outlander attacks, Makini is excited for her Mpando Mpya, the planting of a baobab tree in Mizimu Grove by a Royal Mjuzi in training. To cheer everyone up, Kion decides to make Makini's Mpando Mpya a big event and invites all of the Pride Landers to witness it, and asks Timon and Pumbaa to put on a show to entertain them. However, the skinks overhear this and inform Scar, who comes up with a plan to take over Mizimu Grove. After dealing with Janja's clan, Reirei's pack, and Kiburi's float attacking Mizimu Grove during the festivities, Scar's spirit appears in the flames of a fire and comes face to face with Simba and the Pride Landers for the first time. The Pride Landers become spooked by Scar's appearance and consider leaving the Pride Lands to avoid further attacks. Later, Kion gets some advice from Mufasa and then discovers that the baobab sapling that Makini left behind had survived the whole attack. This inspires the Pride Landers to stay, as they realize that they are stronger together, and celebrate this moment with Makini's Mpando Mpya. Song: "Tujiinue" sung by Timon and Pumbaa and "Tujiinue Reprise" sung by Fuli
55	29	"Fire from the Sky"	Howy Parkins, Tom Derosier	Jack Monaco	April 22, 2019	232	0.44
When Ono has trouble detecting the source of the fire falling from the sky, the Lion Guard persuades an eagle named Anga to assist Ono with flying higher. Anga soon discovers Mzingo's flock has been setting the recent fires, under Scar's orders. Kion decides to have more birds take on the vultures, so he sends Ono to collect Hadithi, with Anga following him. Ono then leads Hadithi, Anga, and the rest of the Pride Lands' birds to take down Mzingo's flock while the Lion Guard stops the fires from getting into the Maumivu thorn patch. Song: "Height and Sight" sung by Anga and Ono

=== Season 3 (2019) ===
No. overall	No. in season	Title	Directed by	Written by	Original release date	Prod. code	US viewers (millions)
56	1	"Battle for the Pride Lands"	Howy Parkins	Ford Riley	August 3, 2019	301 302	0.54
Kion and the Lion Guard have grown into teenagers and continue to defend the Pride Lands from Scar and his army. Simba suggests they take the battle with Scar into the Outlands to defeat his army once and for all. Meanwhile, Janja finds himself and his clan starting to consider joining Jasiri's clan. That night, the Lion Guard gathers all of their allies, and Janja’s clan is sent to distract them. Unbeknownst to Janja, however, Scar has Mzingo’s flock, Reirei's pack, and Kiburi's float set fire to Pride Rock to take out his clan as well as the royal family and the Lion Guard. Realizing Scar has betrayed them, Janja asks for Jasiri's help while the Lion Guard escapes through an underwater tunnel along with Cheezi, Chungu, Nne, Tano, and the other hyenas. Janja tells Kion of the supposed way to vanquish Scar, by using the Roar at full power inside the Outlands volcano. Unbeknownst to Janja's clan and the others, this is part of Scar's plan to trick Kion into causing the volcano to erupt, destroying the Pride Lands. Scar then tells Ushari the story of how he got his scar from a strange lion and cobra and was teased by Mufasa, leading to his downfall. The next morning, the Pride Landers and the hyenas charge into battle with Scar's army, allowing the Lion Guard to get to the top of the volcano. Once they reach the pit, Ushari bites Kion on the face, giving him a scar as well. Kion, refusing to use violence, instead summons the Great Lions of the Past to vanquish Scar. Ushari tries to attack Kion again, but is knocked into the lava pit by Bunga and is killed. Ono suffers eye damage from the ash fumes while rescuing Bunga. With Scar gone, Janja determines that Jasiri should assume control of the Outlands, and she accepts. Back at Pride Rock, Rafiki instructs Kion to eat Tuliza blossoms to help soothe the venom in his scar and deduces that Kion and Ono’s injuries can be healed by the Tree of Life, a faraway place where sick animals go to get better. Rafiki tells the Lion Guard that it can be found by following the paintings on the moja kwa moja stones. Due to Ono's eye damage, Kion names Anga as the new keenest of sight and renames Ono as the smartest member. The Lion Guard then sets off on a journey to the Tree of Life, with Makini joining them. Songs: "We Will Defend" sung by The Lion Guard chorus, "A New Way to Go" sung by Janja and Jasiri, "On The Last Night" sung by Kion, Bunga, Fuli, Ono, and Beshte, and "When I Led the Guard" sung by Scar
57	2	"The Harmattan"	Howy Parkins; Tom Derosier	Gus Constantellis	September 7, 2019	303	0.47
Traveling through the Backlands, the guard comes across Makucha and his leap of leopards. When a harmattan strikes, they all take shelter in a cave. Makucha reluctantly decides to show the guard the way out of his territory. After overhearing Makini talk about the Tree of Life and all of the rare animals there, Makucha decides to go there to feast on all of them. Makucha's first plan of leading the guard off a cliff and forcing Makini to take him and his companions, Fahari and Jiona, to the Tree is foiled by Ono's cleverness. So Makucha then decides to secretly follow the Lion Guard to the Tree of Life. Song: "The Tree of Life" sung by Makucha
58	3	"The Accidental Avalanche"	Howy Parkins; Tom Derosier	John Loy, Elise Allen	September 8, 2019	304	0.48
When Kion loses control of the Roar of the Elders on a snowy mountain, he starts an avalanche that destroys the home of a family of snow monkeys. Wanting to make things right, Kion and the Lion Guard search for a new home for the snow monkeys, but his scar keeps making the situation worse. When Bunga and the snow monkeys fall into a deep hole, Kion gives Fuli the task of leading the Lion Guard. Song: "A Snow Monkey's Home" sung by the Snow Monkeys
59	4	"Ghost of the Mountain"	Howy Parkins	Kendall Michele Haney	September 14, 2019	305	0.40
On their way to the next moja kwa moja stone, the Lion Guard reaches a bamboo forest and comes across a group of red pandas who claim that Bunga is their chosen one who will defeat a ghost that has been terrorizing them. The guard soon discovers that the ghost is actually a snow leopard named Chuluun. After Chuluun is defeated and the guard continues on their way, Makucha finds Chuluun and convinces her to join him on his trip to the Tree of Life. Song: "Ghost of the Mountain" sung by the Red Pandas
60	5	"Marsh of Mystery"	Howy Parkins	Kendall Michele Haney	September 15, 2019	306	0.40
While traveling through a marsh to get to the next moja kwa moja stone, Makini and Ono get distracted by some marsh lights and are separated from the rest of the guard and end up falling into a cavern below the marsh. Meanwhile, the rest of the Lion Guard is confused when a group of angry Mongooses starts attacking them because Bunga is unknowingly eating their snails. Song: "Anything" sung by Makini and Ono
61	6	"Dragon Island"	Howy Parkins; Tom Derosier	Alison Taylor	September 21, 2019	307	0.40
The Lion Guard and Makini reach an ocean and meet a dolphin named Lumba-Lumba who saves Bunga. They then travel onto a peninsula to get to the next moja kwa moja stone but are attacked by a trio of Komodo dragons led by Ora. While trying to get rid of them, Kion loses control of the Roar and accidentally washes away the land bridge and beaches Lumba-Lumba. Ora's bank soon returns and attacks the Lion Guard and Lumba-Lumba. After a battle, Kion roars a path off the island, which sends Lumba-Lumba back to the ocean and washes away Ora and the other Komodo dragons. Meanwhile, unbeknownst to the guard, Makucha and Chuluun find Ora and convince him to join them on their journey to the Tree of Life to get revenge on the Lion Guard. Song: "That's the Dolphin Way" sung by Lumba-Lumba
62	7	"Journey of Memories"	Howy Parkins; Tom Derosier	Jennifer Skelly	September 22, 2019	308	0.45
On their way to the next moja kwa moja stone, the Lion Guard travels through a desert, where they have trouble finding their next landmark, which they believe is supposed to be a field of white flowers. Meanwhile, Makini reminisces about her first trip to the Tree of Life she took with her parents, Kitendo and Fikiri. Eventually, the Lion Guard realizes that the next landmark is not a field of flowers, but actually four bright stars in the night sky. Song: "As You Move Forward" sung by Kitendo and Fikiri
63	8	"The Race to Tuliza"	Howy Parkins	Kent Redeker	September 28, 2019	309	0.43
After traveling through the desert, the Lion Guard comes across a beach with a salty body of water. Taking Makini's advice, Kion decides to soak in the water to soothe his scar and becomes relaxed. While Kion is relaxing, Fuli runs off to search for some tuliza for him and comes across a cheetah named Azaad, whom she must race for to show her where the tuliza is. Meanwhile, when a noisy flock of flamingos shows up at the beach, the guard works to keep Kion calm. Song: "Flamingo Dance Party" sung by the Flamingos
64	9	"Mama Binturong"	Howy Parkins	Gus Constantellis	September 29, 2019	310	0.45
The Lion Guard reaches a forest in which all the animals seem to be afraid of Tuliza. Eventually, the Lion Guard learns that a binturong known as Mama Binturong controls all of the tuliza in the forest with the help of her porcupine henchmen led by Smun and that she has stolen Makini's staff which had tuliza in it. Bunga then sneaks into Mama's hideout in the stone forest and gets Makini's staff back with the help of his stink. Enraged that her tuliza was ruined by Bunga's stink, Mama Binturong swears revenge on him and leaves the stone forest and Smun's prickle to follow the Lion Guard. Song: "You Best Not Mess With Mama" sung by Mama Binturong and the Porcupines
65	10	"Friends to the End"	Howy Parkins; Tom Derosier	Alison Taylor	October 5, 2019	311	0.39
When Kion starts to act mean to everyone, Bunga wonders if Kion is turning evil like Scar due to the venom from his scar. Things come to a head when Kion yells at Beshte and almost fights Fuli. Ashamed of himself, Kion runs off. Fuli and the rest of the guard assure Bunga that Kion will never turn evil. Meanwhile, after seeing Scar in his reflection, Kion decides to apologize to everyone, but he accidentally falls on a branch hanging over a cliff. With the help of a friendly clouded leopard, the guard is able to rescue Kion. Song: "Friends to the End" sung by Fuli, Beshte, Ono, Makini, and Anga
66	11	"The Tree of Life"	Howy Parkins	Kendall Michele Haney	October 6, 2019	312	0.40
Nearing the end of their journey to the Tree of Life, the Lion Guard reaches a mountain pass, where Bunga accidentally starts a rock slide. Believing that the guard is a threat, the protectors of the Tree, the Night Pride, a group of lions consisting of Rani, Baliyo, Nirmala, and Surak, arrive at the mountain pass and fight with the guard. Kion loses control of the Roar and sends Baliyo flying. After this, Rani tells Kion that he and his friends will never be welcome at the Tree of Life. Rani then goes inside the Tree and tells her grandmother Queen Janna about Kion's roar. Recognizing it as the Roar of the Elders, Queen Janna tells Rani to welcome the guard to the Tree. After Rani consults with the spirits of her parents, she and the Night Pride return to the mountain pass and lead the guard to the Tree of Life. Song: "Kion's Reckoning" sung by Kion
67	12	"The River of Patience"	Howy Parkins; Tom Derosier	Jennifer Skelly	October 12, 2019	313	0.46
Now at the Tree of Life, Rani and the Night Pride take the Lion Guard inside to meet Queen Janna, who tells Ono that his cure will take a few days to prepare and that curing Kion will take time. Nirmala takes Kion to the River of Patience to complete a task for his first step in healing. Makini stays with Queen Janna while the guard is given a tour by Rani, who explains that the Tree of Life is home to every kind of habitat. Meanwhile, Makucha, Chuluun, and Ora arrive at the mountain pass and Ullu the owl informs Rani, who takes the Night Pride with her to fight them off. The next day, Kion completes his task, and he and the guard help the Night Pride fight off another attack by Makucha, Chuluun, and Ora. Later, Mama Binturong finds the villains and declares herself their new leader. Song "Welcome to the Tree of Life" sung by Rani
68	13	"Little Old Ginterbong"	Howy Parkins	Gus Constantellis	October 13, 2019	314	0.40
As Kion continues his healing process, Ono's cure is ready. While Ono goes to the Tree of Life with Nirmala, Baliyo introduces Bunga to another honey badger named Binga, with who Bunga competes in a series of contests to see who the better honey badger is. Meanwhile, Mama Binturong poses as an animal in trouble so she can get into the Tree of Life and get information for Makucha, Chuluun, and Ora. In the meantime, Ono's eyesight is healed, though his vision is not as keen as before. Using the information she has gathered, Mama Binturong plans an attack on the Tree of Life, but the attack is foiled due to Ono's cleverness. Song: "Who is Better Than Who" sung by Binga and Bunga
69	14	"Poa the Destroyer"	Howy Parkins; Tom Derosier	Allison Taylor, Kendall Michele Haney, John Loy, Ford Riley	October 19, 2019	315	0.48
While Kion continues his healing, Beshte explores the Tree of Life to make new friends, and unknowingly causes accidents around the different habitats, which makes the other animals think he is a bad guy and call him Poa the destroyer. However, Beshte proves himself worthy when he saves a penguin named Pinguino from falling off an icy cliff. Song "Poa the Destroyer" sung by Pinguino
70	15	"Long Live the Queen"	Howy Parkins	Story by : Ford Riley; Teleplay by : Kendall Michele Haney	October 20, 2019	316	0.45
Queen Janna completes her journey in the Circle of Life, and Rani worries about taking her place as queen of the Tree of Life. Kion shares his experience when he was first appointed as the leader of the Lion Guard, assuring Rani that she will overcome her insecurity. Learning that Kion is unsure of speaking with Mufasa because of his scar, looking like Scar, Rani tells Kion that his scar does not make him who he is and convinces Kion to confide in Mufasa. Makini shows Rani the paintings left behind by Janna to give her the guidance she needs when at a loss, especially when helping a family of tigers find a new home. After being crowned as queen, Rani realizes that she is ready to become queen like her grandmother believed she is. Song: "Long Live the Queen" sung by Nirmala, Fuli, Anga, and the animals of the Tree of Life Note: Due to its themes, this episode features a warning before the episode begins.
71	16	"The Lake of Reflection"	Howy Parkins; Tom Derosier	Jennifer Skelly	October 26, 2019	317	0.38
Kion finds it hard to lead with his scar bothering him, so Nirmala takes him to the lake of reflection to find his true leadership. When Rani and the Lion Guard get worried when Kion thinks he is useless without the Roar, Anga reminds him that he, Bunga, Fuli, and Beshte rescued Ono just before he hatched from his egg from Janja's clan when they were little. Remembering the incident helps Kion regain his confidence and leads the team against Makucha, Chuluun, Ora, and Mama Binturong. Kion confides to Mufasa that he is ready to let the Roar go as he is already a leader even without it. Mufasa instructs him to go to Cikha Escarpment where Kion meets the spirit of the leader of the first Lion Guard, Askari. As Kion is willing to let the Roar go, Askari deems Kion ready to master it. Song: "Remember What Makes You You" sung by Fuli and Anga
72	17	"Triumph of the Roar"	Howy Parkins	John Loy	October 27, 2019	318	0.37
Kion is healed but still refuses to use the Roar, making Bunga suspicious. Bunga shares his suspicion with Rani and Makini. Makini deduces that Kion is training his Roar at the Cikha Escarpment like Askari did in the past. Meanwhile, Mama Binturong recruits Fahari, Jiona, Ora's Bank members, and Smun's prickle to help Makucha, Chuluun, and Ora take over the Tree of Life. They trap Makini and the Night Pride inside the Tree of Life and hunt down the other animals protected by the rest of the Lion Guard who are outnumbered. Kion arrives in time and uses his newly mastered Roar of the Elders to blow their enemies far away from the Tree of Life. With their enemies gone for good and the Roar restored, Rani asks the Lion Guard to stay at the Tree of Life. Song: "The Power of the Roar" sung by Askari
73	18	"Journey to the Pride Lands"	Howy Parkins; Ford Riley	Kent Redeker, Kendall Michele Haney, John Loy, Ford Riley	November 2, 2019	319	0.43
As Kion is thinking of whether to go back to the Pride Lands or stay at the Tree of Life, he and Rani profess their love and Rani proposes to Kion. Before he answers, Azaad arrives with Janja and Jasiri, who tell the Lion Guard that Zira and her pride of Outsiders have returned. Kion and the Lion Guard rush back home, with Kion using his roar to take a shortcut taken by Azaad and help make the journey easier, but he soon realizes that his team is more important than the roar as it makes a hole in the Great Stone Wall holding up a big lake. After a long journey, Kion and his friends arrive in the Outlands and prepare themselves to confront Zira's pride. Songs: "Of the Same Pride" sung by Kion and Rani and "As You Move On" sung by The Lion Guard chorus
74	19	"Return to the Pride Lands"	Howy Parkins; Tom Derosier	Kendall Michele Haney, Ford Riley	November 3, 2019	320	0.46
The Lion Guard, Janja, Jasiri, and Azaad reunite with Cheezi, Chungu, Madoa, and Mzingo's flock, who informs them that Zira's pride has already gone into the Pride Lands. On their way to Pride Rock, they encounter Vitani who has formed her own Lion Guard and a battle ensues. Kiara and Kovu arrive and stop the fight, revealing that Zira is dead while the rest of her pride has joined Simba's pride. Kion and his friends then return to the Pride Lands where they are reunited with their families and friends. The next day, Kion and his friends discover Vitani's Lion Guard in their lair and argue about which one should be the Lion Guard because both Kion and Vitani have the right to be siblings of the future rulers. They decide to hold a competition against each other. When Kion is pitted against Vitani, she calls for a mashindano for the final competition. Seeing Vitani is confident to lead the Guard even without the Roar of the Elders, Kion accepts Vitani's Lion Guard and passes the role to them along with Kion bestowing Vitani with her own Roar. No longer the Lion Guard, Kion and his friends return to the Tree of Life as its protectors by becoming members of the Night Pride with Kion marrying Rani and becoming the King of the Tree of Life. Song: "Long Live the King ("Long Live the Queen" Reprise)" sung by The Lion Guard chorus
