= Child bereavement =

Child bereavement occurs when a child loses someone of importance in their life. There is substantial research regarding grief in adults, but there is less focus in literature about grief among children. Children will experience instances in their life that could involve losing a parent, sibling, or friend through suicide, unintentional injury, homicide, or natural causes. The levels of grief and bereavement differ among children, including uncomplicated and complicated bereavement. Unlike adults, children may experience and express their grief and bereavement through behaviors, and are less likely to outwardly express their emotions. The children who experience bereavement and grief can receive treatment involving group intervention, play therapy, and cognitive behavioral therapy. Different forms of treatment for children experiencing bereavement and or grief can help to reduce symptoms of anxiety, depression, social adjustment, and posttraumatic stress. Research has shown that it is important to be aware of the difficulties in predicting how losing a closed one can impact a child’s emotionality and how their coping abilities will differ across ages and cultures.

== Background ==
Across cultures the loss of a parent is consistently rated as one of the most difficult experiences that a child will endure. In western countries, 5% of children will experience the loss of a parent. Across the world, the loss of a parent is seen as a significant life event for a child. However, the process of grieving can look different for each child based on their age, the quality of the relationship with the deceased parent, and the characteristics of the death.

An individual’s culture is an important factor that will influence the bereavement process. What one culture believes to be maladaptive, another culture may view as healthy; there is no universally accepted view of the bereavement process

== Bereavement ==
There are two categories of bereavement that children experience after the loss of a parent; complex bereavement and uncomplicated bereavement. Uncomplicated bereavement is the normal process that most children will experience. Complicated bereavement occurs when an individual fails to return to their pre-bereavement emotional and behavioural functioning. The loss of a family member, in addition to complicated bereavement, increases the risk of experiencing a range of negative psychological consequences including depression, post-traumatic stress, higher levels of drug and alcohol use and more self-injury than non-bereaved peers. The risk of dying at a young age is also severely elevated for this group.

The precise definition and duration of the bereavement process has been a source of controversy over the decades. According to the DSM-V, Persistent Complex Bereavement Disorder, requires that the child lost someone that they had a close relationship with; and during a 6 month period the child must experience on more days than not, one of the following symptoms: a yearning for the deceased individual, sorrow or emotional pain for the dead, preoccupation with the death, or preoccupation surrounding the circumstances around the death. Additionally, six more symptoms must be experienced on more days than not that are related to reactive distress to death or social/identity disruption.

== Development considerations ==
Children can be vulnerable to life events following loss. The vulnerability is due to developmental immaturity and the lack of developed coping abilities. It is common to assume children will grieve in a similar fashion to adults, but their symptoms and duration of grief following loss appears differently. This may include children repeatedly asking questions about death for reassurance that nothing has changed and reenacting the death or funeral activities. Additionally, children’s emotions may be expressed differently than adults; adults may express their grief through sadness, but children may misbehave or have outbursts. Research emphasizes the importance of being cognizant of and not to expect children to display their emotions outwardly like adults, but rather that their behaviors could indicate their internal distress. Grief reactions in children are varied, wide-ranging and unique to each individual.

== Treatment ==
A large portion of children may experience loss and bereavement at some point during their childhood. After these losses occur, there are a variety of types of treatment techniques that can be implemented, including Play Therapy, Group Therapy, and Cognitive Behavioral Therapy. Play therapy for loss during childhood uses activities like drawing or games that aid in having the children talk about their feelings. Another effective form of therapy is Group Therapy tailored for loss during childhood, where a group of peers, similar in age, share and talk about their feelings and the bereavement process with a facilitator leading the group. Lastly, Cognitive Behavioral Therapy for loss during childhood includes using cognitive techniques to assist the child in changing their behavior and using more effective coping techniques.

The different forms of treatment aiming to assist children in coping with loss and bereavement also help to reduce their symptoms of anxiety, depression, adjustment issues, and posttraumatic stress. By using empirically driven forms of therapy for children who have experienced loss, children can reduce their symptoms and will be less likely to drop out of treatment by focusing on the feelings and reaction they have to the death or suicide of someone close.
