= Shadowland (song) =

Song by Heather Headley and Tsidii Le Loka

from the album The Lion King: Original Broadway Cast Recording
- Released: January 1, 1997
- Recorded: 1996
- Genre: Soul; pop
- Length: 4:30
- Label: Walt Disney
- Composers: Hans Zimmer; Lebo M
- Lyricists: Mark Mancina; Lebo M
- Producers: Mark Mancina; Robert Elhai

"Shadowland" is a song written by Lebo M, Hans Zimmer, and Mark Mancina for the musical The Lion King (1997), a stage adaptation of Disney's 1994 animated feature film of the same name. Based on the song "Lea Halalela (Holy Land)", a track featured on Lebo's Lion King-inspired concept album Rhythm of the Pride Lands (1995), Lebo composed the track with Zimmer, while both Lebo and Mancina contributed new lyrics to its melody. Lebo based the song's lyrics on his own experiences having been exiled from South Africa during apartheid, therefore imbuing "Shadowland" with themes about refugeeism and survival.

Originally performed by Trinidadian-American singer and actress Heather Headley as Nala, and South African actress Tsidii Le Loka as Rafiki, roles both performers originated on stage, "Shadowland" narrates Nala's decision to leave the Pride Lands in search of a more habitable environment upon realizing that her homeland has grown dry and barren in the midst of Scar's reign. Taking place shortly after Nala rejects Scar's romantic advances, director Julie Taymor used the song to develop Nala into a stronger character for the stage adaptation, and identified "Shadowland" as her favorite among the production's original songs, believing its message and themes to be universal.

Musically, "Shadowland" is a soul power ballad. Sung in both English and African languages, its instrumentation combines African percussion with European orchestration to create a more exotic sound while accompanying pop vocals and African chants; some critics have observed political themes such as feminism, injustice and the ecosystem throughout the song's lyrics. "Shadowland" has been mostly positively received by music and theatre critics; both Headley and actresses who replaced her in subsequent productions of the musical have been praised for their vocals and performances.

== Background ==
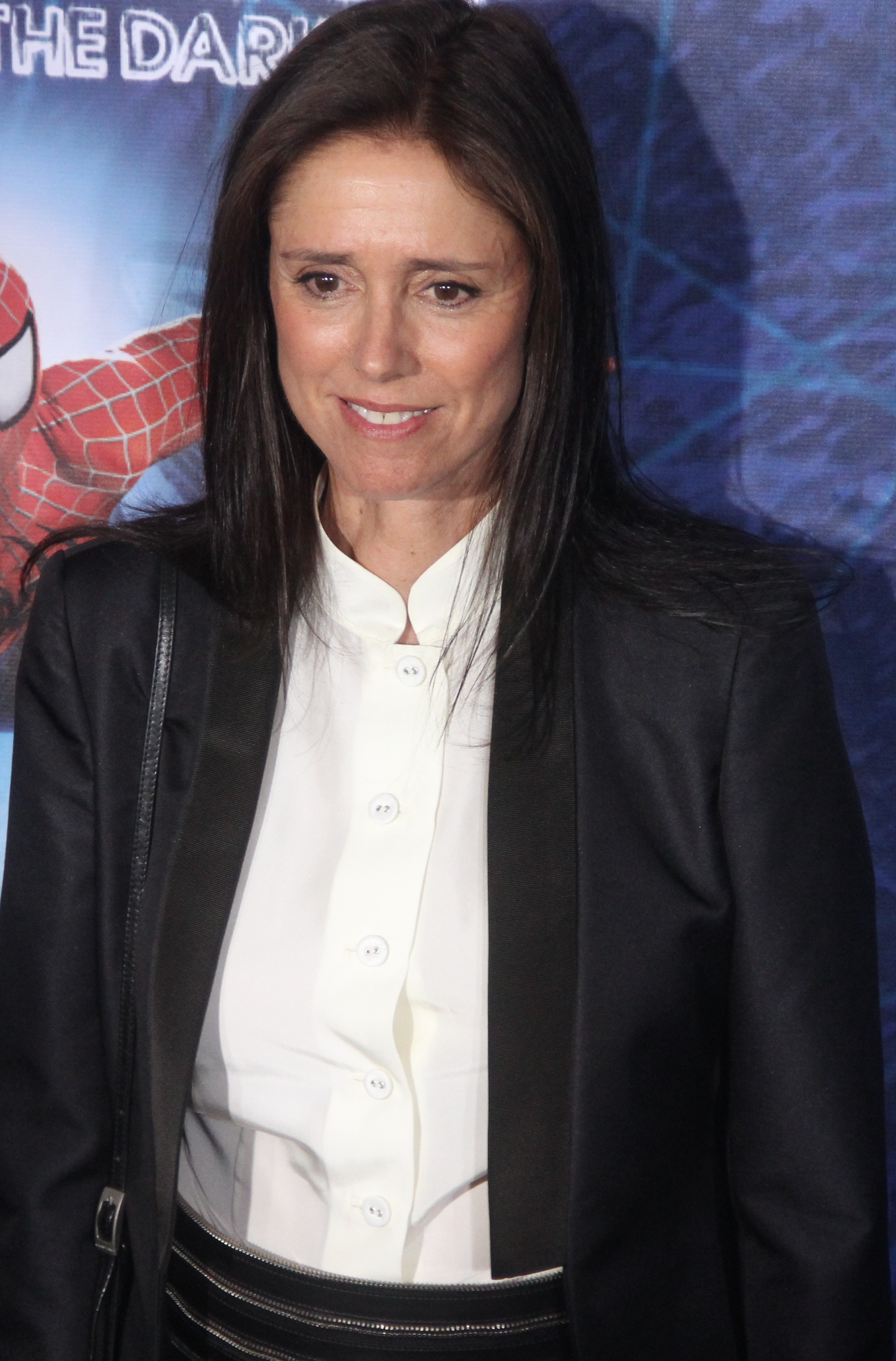
Director Julie Taymor used "Shadowland" to develop Nala into a stronger, more complex heroine than how she is depicted in the animated film.

Disney decided that the five pop-oriented songs composer Elton John and lyricist Tim Rice had written for the animated film would be augmented by more exotic-sounding, percussive and African-influenced musical numbers for its stage adaptation. "Shadowland" was written by songwriters Lebo M, Hans Zimmer, and Mark Mancina, with Lebo and Zimmer composing its music, while both Lebo and Mancina wrote the song's lyrics. "Shadowland" is based on "Lea Halalela (Holy Land)", a song Zimmer and Lebo had originally written for the film that debuted on the Lion King-inspired concept album Rhythm of the Pride Lands (1995). The track itself is inspired by an orchestral theme used in the film. Based on both an excerpt from Zimmer's film score and "Lea Halalela (Holy Land)", "Shadowland" was the fifth of the musical's original songs to be directly adapted from a Rhythm of the Pride Lands track. Meanwhile, Lebo and Mancina contributed new lyrics to the song's pre-existing music, with Lebo basing his lyrics on his own experience being exiled from South Africa during apartheid. Mancina arranged and produced the track himself.

In the animated film, Nala contributes to two duets: "I Just Can't Wait to be King" and "Can You Feel the Love Tonight". Director Julie Taymor found herself drawn to the South African musical influences Lebo introduced to the production during rehearsals. Acknowledging the film's lack of prominent female roles, the director was interested in expanding Nala's role into that of a more complex, three dimensional character for the musical, and believed "Shadowland" would help develop her into a stronger heroine. Will Albrittonat of the University of South Florida's The Oracle agreed that the song strengthens Nala's character, allowing her a greater significant role. Taymor explained, "When you talk about lions, the females do all of it ... So I threw out a lot of the soft stuff in the film and made Nala very strong", giving the character "one of the best songs in the show, 'Shadowland,' which is about being a refugee," a subject the director believes remains "very topical". Furthermore, Taymor cited the song as a "perfect" example of music that "has a narrative force of its own", via which "Nala's feelings are transmitted". Calling the ballad "extraordinary", Taymor identified "Shadowland" as one of her favorite songs in the musical, second to "Circle of Life", and continues to get emotional when she hears it. In addition to originating the role of Nala, Trinidadian-American singer and actress Heather Headley recorded "Shadowland" for The Lion King: Original Broadway Cast Recording.

== Context and use in The Lion King ==
"Shadowland" is performed by Nala before she leaves the Pride Lands in search of a better home, once she decides she can no longer tolerate Scar's treacherous rule. Set during the musical's second act, the song takes place shortly after "The Madness of King Scar", in which Nala rebukes Scar's lecherous attempt to make her his queen. Nala is forced to choose between surviving or remaining with her pride. Seeking permission from them before she leaves in search of a fertile land to where they can possibly relocate, Nala bids an emotional farewell to her fellow lionesses and homeland, which has grown dry and barren due to famine and drought under Scar's reign. Performed against a background of "jungle fauna", the lionesses join Nala in chanting while mourning the decrepit state of what was once their ancestors' home, voicing their dissatisfaction with the condition of its ecosystem. Ultimately, Nala promises to eventually return with hope, and "always remember [her] pride". Rafiki also bestows her personal, sacred blessings upon the young lioness. Featuring exclusively females, the sequence features feline-influenced movements and choreography. According to Sarah O'Hara of Lowdown Magazine, the performance "demonstrate[s] all the desperation the lionesses faced in the hunt for food". John Moore of The Denver Post believes that by preceding “Endless Night" and "He Lives in You", "Shadowland" initiates a climax that becomes a "stampede of ongoing powerful moments". Everett Evans, writing for the Houston Chronicle, agreed that the song is one of the show's ballads that supply the musical with "emotional clout".

Actress Kissy Simmons described the musical number as the moment "her character has to do something to help her pride of lionesses". Simmons believes that, at this point in the musical, most of the lionesses have already either been raped or sexually harassed by Scar by the time Nala realizes how dangerous the Pride Lands have become, forcing her to leave in search help. Depicting Nala's "fierce drive", the ballad further demonstrates the heroine's loyalty, beauty, and strength. Nala experiences several different emotions during the song, beginning reserved as she observes how barren her homeland has become, a feeling that transitions into sadness and vulnerability, before she ultimately accepts that she must "fight for this land, and get things to where they used to be", according to actress Noxolo Dlamini. Miyako Singer of The Daily Californian wrote that, in addition to providing Nala with "her big solo moment", the song "showcases ... Nala's strength and determination".

Several critics and performances have observed feminist motifs in the staging of the musical number. Due to the musical performance depicting lionesses fighting back against "a male-dominated regime", the Houston Chronicle's Wei-Huan Chen likened the song to a women's march, comparing its use of black feminism to the music video for singer Beyonce's "Formation" (2016). Furthermore, Chen said Nala sings in response to Scar's insistence "that she, as his property, will bear his children without her consent". Citing "Shadowland" as her favorite moment from the show, ensemble singer Lindiwe Dlamini, who had sung the song for over 8,000 performances by 2017, agreed that "There's something about the strength of a woman in that moment". Ensemble actress Pia Hamilton agreed with Taymor's conscious decision to make certain scenes, such as "Shadowland", particularly "female heavy", believing that the song is used to depict "women in power". Kieran Jonson of WhatsOnStage.com wrote that "Shadowland" offers Nala a moment to "shine".

== Music and lyrics ==
Sung slowly, emotionally, and dramatically, "Shadowland" is performed in the key of A minor at a tempo of 70 beats per minute, and lasts four minutes and thirty seconds in duration. The Disney Song Encyclopedia author Thomas S. Hischak described "Shadowland" as a "hauntingly beautiful ballad", while I. Herbert, author of Theatre Record, called it "hauntingly expressive". Several critics and media publications have acknowledged the song's "haunting" nature and sentiment. Musically, the ballad begins sad in tone, before growing more determined and hopeful as it progresses. The song combines Zimmer's original melody with both English and African phrases that result in "a beguiling tribal flavor". Seth Kubersky of Orlando Weekly identified "Shadowland" as one of the musical's original songs lifted from the film's score. Theatre Histories: An Introduction author Phillip B. Zarrilli agreed that "Shadowland" fuses "African and European rhythms and orchestration". According to the book The Oxford Handbook of The American Musical, "Shadowland"'s prominent use of African sounds is a strong example of Non-Western musical styles occasionally appearing in theater. Due to its African and South African influences, WhatsOnStage.com's Richard Forrest cited the composition as one of the few songs written specifically for the musical that "express most fully the show's African roots", featuring African percussion and "soul-searching lyrics". Martin Brady, writing for the Nashville Scene, observed that African folk rhythms, melodies and choral harmonies are particularly "omnipresent" throughout "Shadowland". Lowdown Magazine's Sarah O'Hara described "Shadowland" as a soul song performed "with power ballad emotion". The song also incorporates pop rock influences. Instrumentally, "Shadowland" makes use of synthesizer strings.

NewsOK's Brandy McDonnell described the ballad as an "understated ode". Described by Thesauro Cultural of The Cult as an "evocative ballad", the song begins with an African-language chant: "Fatshe leso lea halalela". Lyrically, the song is about "losing [one's] home and finding solace elsewhere", according to Taymor, and alludes to themes about surviving as a refugee. Writing for the Houston Chronicle, Wei-Huan Chen agreed that "Shadowland" explores several political themes and subtexts that include feminism, believing its title is "applicable to any period in history shrouded by injustice". Taymor agreed that, in addition to being "reminiscent of Africa", the ballad boasts several additional interpretations that can be understood by virtually any culture "without understanding what is being said". Janice M. Nargi, writing for JMN Publications, agreed that the song "fuse[s] contemporary messages of courage and empowerment with insistent cadences that suggest universality and timelessness". "Shadowland" also features an ecology-themed message, demonstrated by its lyric "“The river's dry, the ground has broken". Michael Billington, arts critic for The Guardian, believes the song's use of grassland chants "pays homage to Africa".

Billboard music critic Larry Flick said Headley and actress Tsidii Le Loka exchange "smooth pop vocals and traditional tribal chants"; the soloists are augmented by a choir who "gradually builds the song to anthemic proportions". Describing Headley's vocals as "sung achingly", The New York Times Stephen Holden recognized "Shadowland" among the musical's three original ballads that serve as "potent vocal showcases" while contributing "genuine emotional depth" to the production, alongside "They Live in You" and "Endless Night". Headley's vocal range on the song spans approximately two octaves, from E_{3} to A_{5}. Vocally, the ballad is believed to be best-suited for a mezzo-soprano/belter vocalist, according to the book Singer's Musical Theatre Anthology - Volume 4: Mezzo-Soprano/Belter.

== Critical reception ==
To promote the musical, Headley performed "Shadowland" with Le Loka live on the Late Show with David Letterman in 1997, which Headley believes greatly showcased her voice. Critical reception towards "Shadowland" has been positive, with Headley consistently earning praise for her live renditions during her tenure as Nala. In August 1997, Chris Hewit of the St. Paul Pioneer Press commended Headley's "passionate" interpretation, while Playbill's Robert Simonson reported that the singer's performance "draws applause every night". Richard Forrest of WhatsOnStage.com ranked "Shadowland" among the musical's standout songs. Variety's Matt Wolf said the ballad "stops the second act". Lisa Martland, writing for The Stage, described the song as a highlight that offers a poignancy she found lacking throughout the rest of the show. Michael Portantiere, author of The Theatermania Guide to Musical Theater Recordings, ranked "Shadowland" among the best new additions to the show's score. Rex Smith, writing for Newsweek, called the song "beautiful", while Mark Collins of the Reporter-Herald described it as "show stopping and mournful". Describing "Shadowland" as a "glorious ballad", Billboard's Larry Flick opined that both pop and R&B radio stations should be appreciate the track. Carrie Ruth Moore of the Daily Trojan believes “Shadowland" is one of the main reasons the original cast album won a Grammy Award for Best Musical Show Album in 1999.

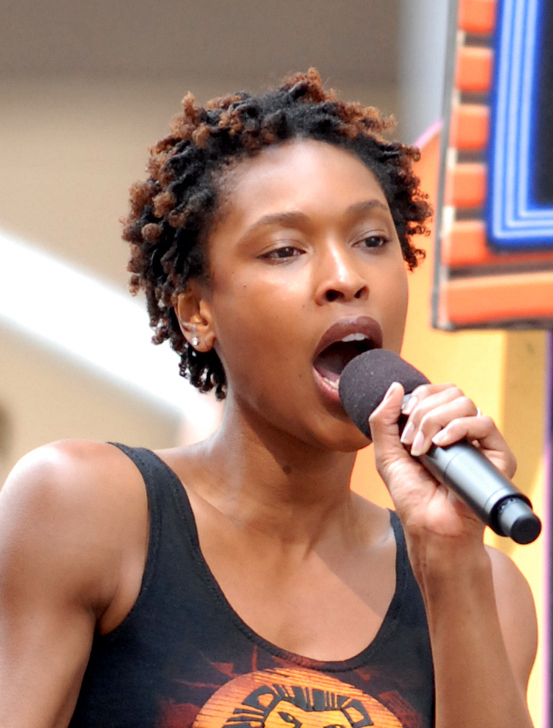
Actress Kissy Simmons (pictured) has become closely associated with the song after Headley's departure; both renditions have been praised.

Since Headley's departure, actresses who replaced her in subsequent productions continued to receive praise for their renditions. When actress Kissy Simmons auditioned for the role in 2002, she auditioned using "Shadowland"; Taymor enjoyed her rendition to the point where she remarked "where have you been all of these years?" Jay Handelman, contributing to the Sarasota Herald-Tribune, said Simmons "shines during 'Shadowland'." Laura Sternberg of About.com's Detroit Travel Guide praised Syndee Winters' performance at the Detroit Opera House, calling both her voice and the song "memorable". Praising actress Ta'Rea Campbell's performance at the Bass Concert Hall in 2007, Robert Faires of The Austin Chronicle wrote that she "fills 'Shadowland' with such urgency as to make it a potent dramatic statement as well as a lovely ballad." Describing "Shadowland" as both "inspiring" and "lovely", The San Diego Union-Tribune critic Pam Kragen wrote that actress Marja Harmon sung the song "with great beauty".

Actress Nia Holloway has also garnered strong reviews, whose rendition Shannon McLoud of Motif Magazine deemed worth "The price of admission". The Daily Californian's Miyako Singer commended Holloway's rendition of "Shadowland" for "showcas[ing] her incredible vocal chops", while the Toronto Star's Kelly Cameron called the actress' vocals "stunning". Recognizing Holloway's performance as a standout, the News and Tribune contributor Claire White said her "combination of vocals and movement gave a great display of emotion to the audience". Describing the song itself as "beautifully understated", Brandy McDonnell of NewsOK wrote that Holloway "provided the night's musical highlight" in review of a performance at the Civic Center Music Hall. The Capital Times' Lindsay Christians agreed that the actress sings the musical number "well". K103-FM called the ballad a second act showstopper, writing, "You really feel [Holloway's] presence on the stage" throughout the song.

In a less positive review, Susan Haubenstock of the Richmond Times-Dispatch dismissed "Shadowland" as one of the new songs that resemble "filler", accusing it of slowing down the pace of the production and causing "the action and the energy peter out in the second act." Similarly, Erin Gleeson of the Baltimore City Paper felt "Shadowland" was "unmemorable", writing that it "drag[s] down an otherwise lively and spirited production." Alan Morrison of the Herald Scotland found the song's use of synthesizers dated.

== Impact ==
"Shadowland" is still considered to be one of Headley's signature songs. In October 2014, Disney Theatrical Group released an official lyric video for the song and uploaded it to YouTube. Emily Brandon of Oh My Disney remarked that the song "is one of those songs that sticks with us long after we hear it" due to a combination of its moving lyrics, references to the film's score and appreciation for Nala's and her story". Actor and singer Michael Crawford covered the song in 2001 in a medley of songs from The Lion King, included on The Disney Album. In 2016, Simmons performed the song live on the Disney Wonder cruise ship as part of the Disney Theatrical Group's "Stars Set Sail" live concert series. After Disney announced that singer Beyoncé had been cast as Nala in John Favreau's upcoming CGI remake of The Lion King in November 2017, fans started hoping Beyoncé would be recording a version of "Shadowland" for the film. WLCK's Ray Cornelius speculated, "While this tune was not in the original movie, I'm sure the film's producers will make an exception and allow Beyoncé to perform it or create a new song for her. Let's keep our fingers crossed."
