= The Lion King (original Broadway cast recording) =

The Lion King – Original Broadway Cast Recording

Cast recording by the original Broadway cast
- Released: 1997
- Label: Walt Disney

The Lion King, subtitled Original Broadway Cast Recording, is an album containing a recording of the musical The Lion King made by its 1997 Broadway cast. The album was released by Walt Disney Records in the same year.

== Critical reception ==
Professional ratings
Review scores
Source	Rating
AllMusic	4.5/5 stars
Billboard	(positive)

A Billboard reviewer notes how the recording "combines the original [animated film] score" by Elton John and Tim Rice ("plus some newcomers from the pair") "with other music, especially choral numbers, which more closely reflects the African setting of the work." "Somehow the joys of both musical sensibilities often blend to make the cast album of The Lion King as much an aural delight as its stage version a visual one," he concludes.

== Track listing ==
CD – Walt Disney 60802

No.	Title	Length
1.	"Circle of Life"	4:29
2.	"Grasslands Chant"	2:22
3.	"The Morning Report"	2:32
4.	"The Lioness Hunt"	2:05
5.	"I Just Can't Wait to Be King"	3:02
6.	"Chow Down"	3:17
7.	"They Live in You"	3:01
8.	"Be Prepared"	3:27
9.	"The Stampede"	2:38
10.	"Rafiki Mourns"	2:05
11.	"Hakuna Matata"	3:13
12.	"One by One"	1:52
13.	"The Madness of King Scar"	5:27
14.	"Shadowland"	4:29
15.	"The Lion Sleeps Tonight"	1:10
16.	"Endless Night"	4:42
17.	"Can You Feel the Love Tonight"	4:59
18.	"He Lives in You" (Reprise)	4:12
19.	"Simba Confronts Scar"	2:25
20.	"King of Pride Rock" / "Circle of Life" (Reprise)	3:25

Notes

- The album was produced by Mark Mancina.
- Tracks 2, 4, 10, and 12 were produced by Mark Mancina and Lebo M
- Track 15 was produced by Mark Mancina and Jay Rifkin.

== Certifications ==
Region	Certification	Certified units/sales
United States (RIAA)	Platinum	1,000,000^{^}
^{^} Shipments figures based on certification alone.

== Awards ==
Year	Award type	Categories	Results	Ref.
1999	Grammy Awards	Best Musical Show Album	Won	
