= The Madness of King Scar =

1997 song from the musical The Lion King

Song by Heather Headley, Geoff Hoyle, Tracy Nicole Chapman, Stanley Wayne Mathis, Kevin Cahoon and John Vickery

from the album The Lion King: Original Broadway Cast Recording
- Released: 1 January 1997
- Length: 5:27
- Label: Walt Disney
- Composer: Elton John
- Lyricist: Tim Rice
- Producers: Mark Mancina; Robert Elhai

"The Madness of King Scar" is a song written by English musician Elton John and lyricist Tim Rice, which premiered in the musical The Lion King, a stage adaptation of Disney's 1994 animated feature film of the same name. "The Madness of King Scar" had been added to the musical along with two other songs. It is one of two tracks that more prominently features vocals from the character Nala. The title is a reference to the 1994 film The Madness of King George.

Opening the musical's second act, "The Madness of King Scar" primarily consists of dialogue between Scar, Nala, Zazu, and the hyenas Shenzi, Banzai, and Ed following Scar's rise to power due to his brother Mufasa's death. The lyrics revolve around Scar's paranoia, specifically his anxiety on the comparisons between himself and Mufasa, and his plan to produce an heir for his kingdom with Nala. Scholars had various interpretations of the song's lyrics and composition, who felt it used stream-of-consciousness to portray Scar as a Shakespearean character or interpreted the instrumental as a tango underscoring Scar's behaviour towards Nala. For later productions of the musical, "The Madness of King Scar" was made shorter in length. At one point, was included on the cast album for the original production, with John Vickery portraying Scar. It was also put on the records for the Mexican and Madrid productions.

"The Madness of King Scar" primarily earned positive reviews from music critics, who believed it added more depth to the character of Scar. However, some commentators had more mixed to negative responses; some felt uncertain about the decision to add new material not found in the film to the musical, while others disagreed with the song's explicit content. In 2014, animator Eduardo Quintana created an animated sequence for the song for the 20th anniversary of the animated film. The video received positive reviews from media outlets, who found the animation quality to be on a professional level.

== Background ==
"The Madness of King Scar" is one of three original songs that Elton John and Tim Rice had added for the musical adaptation of Disney's 1994 animated film The Lion King. John had composed the music while Rice wrote the lyrics; the title is a reference to the 1994 film The Madness of King George. Created to further elaborate the storyline, it is one of two new tracks that feature the character Nala, along with "Shadowland". In the original film, she had only performed in a supporting role in the song "Can You Feel the Love Tonight".

The song was inspired by a planned reprise of "Be Prepared" that was storyboarded for the original film, but was ultimately cut from the final version. Smosh's Mikey McCollor wrote that it was removed from the film for being "so creepy", primarily due to Scar's sexual comments toward Nala. Echoing McCollor's comments, io9's Lauren Davis described Scar's interactions with Nala as creepy, and Moviepilot's Olivia van der Will attributed the exclusion of the song to its lyrics' reference to sexuality. Matthew Roulette of TheFW believes that the scene was abandoned because of the characters' significant age difference.

Over the years, several changes have been made to the musical in the interest of streamlining its complex backstage logistics. Part of this effort was trimming "The Madness of King Scar" down to a shorter length, removing the middle verse where Scar sees Mufasa’s ghost. The removal of Scar’s internal perspective resulted in a significant change to the song’s tone, with the current version of the song being less sympathetic to Scar and more focused on the external impact of his actions.

The full original version is included on the cast album for the musical, which was released on 1 January 1997. The recording of the song includes the show's original members Heather Headley, Geoff Hoyle, Tracy Nicole Chapman, Stanley Wayne Mathis, Kevin Cahoon, and John Vickery; Vickery had played the role of Scar for the official recording. The song was also featured on albums for the musical's Mexican and Madrid productions.

== Context and composition ==
Part of the opening to the show's second act, "The Madness of King Scar" takes place entirely in Scar's cave, and involves Scar, Zazu, Nala, and the hyenas Shenzi, Banzai, and Ed. The lead vocal for "The Madness of King Scar" spans between Eb4 to G5, with the instrumental including a piano and chords. An "extended character song for the dissatisfied lion monarch", the lyrics revolve around Scar's "paranoid pursuit of the lion throne". The song is primarily composed of dialogue rather than singing, with Rice describing it, along with "Chow Down", as "just potboilers". The Buffalo News' Heather Violanti summarised the performance as "five minutes of painful rumination by the evil Scar and his hyena henchmen after Scar's usurpation of the throne".

During the song, the hyenas express their discontent with Scar for his inability to deal with a drought affecting the Pride Lands, begging for him to give them a "fix of flesh" to satisfy their "needs". Through the course of the lyrics, Scar becomes increasingly paranoid about comparisons to his deceased brother Mufasa. After fixating on a plan to produce an heir for his kingdom, Scar makes sexual advances to Nala, who explicitly refuses him. Some of Scar's comments to Nala include: "She's got those assets feminine, I have to make her mine!" and "Nala, my, my, how you have grown."

Scholars had various interpretations of the song's lyrics and composition. In their book The Disney Song Encyclopedia, Thomas S. Hischak and Mark A. Robinson described the composition as a "stream-of-consciousness number alternat[ing] between buffoonish comedy and cold-blooded evil". Alfredo Michel Modenessi wrote, in his article "Disney's 'War Efforts': The Lion King and Education for Death; or Shakespeare Made Easy for Your Apocalyptic Convenience" that the song drew close parallels between Scar and a Shakespearean character, and further develops his relationship with the hyenas following his assumption of power. Modenessi identified "The Madness of King Scar" as taking on qualities of a tango. Connecting Scar's behaviour with the Argentine tango, Modenessi described his attempts to approach Nala as occurring to "the beat of that stereotyped 'music of seduction'".

== Reception and impact ==
"The Madness of King Scar" received primarily positive reviews from music critics. Ben Hewis of WhatsOnStage.com included the song in his list of his top five favourite show tunes, writing that it "shin[ed] a humanising light on the thought process of Scar is brilliantly effective storytelling". Hewis found the middle verse of the track to be an interesting exploration of Scar in particular, and was disappointed by its removal from current productions of the musical.

Featuring it as an example of why Scar was one of the "15 most terrifying musical theater villains", Backstage's KC Wright described it as a "snarling signature song". Megan Green of Australian Stage wrote that "The Madness of King Scar" was an example of one of the "new, and equally memorable, songs" created for the musicals. James MacKillop of The Syracuse New Times described "The Madness of King Scar" and "Be Prepared" as the show's standouts.

Some commentators had more mixed to negative responses to the song. Brandon Jones of The Global Dispatch criticised "The Madness of King Scar" and "Chow Down" as "a bit too tedious", and felt that the beginning of the second act was too long. Heather Violanti was critical of the song's content, writing that its "disgusting jokes about intestinal worms may drive you mad yourself", and negatively compared it to the Lebo M-written "One by One".

=== Fan-made animation ===
External videos
- "The Lion King 20th Anniversary Tribute: "The Madness of King Scar""; Eduardo Quintana's fan-made animation for "The Madness of King Scar"

In 2014, animator Eduardo Quintana released an original sequence using a portion of Vickery's version of "The Madness of King Scar". Created as a "tribute" to the musical and the 20th anniversary of the animated film, Quintana had spent roughly two years completing the animation for the video. Focused on the dialogue between Scar and Nala, the scene begins with Scar chewing on a bone before progressing to his sexual propositions to Nala. Released on Quintana's official YouTube account, the video reached over two and a half million views as of 23 November 2016.

Critical response to the video has been positive. Mikey McCollor praised the animation, writing that he had initially believed it was done by Walt Disney Animation Studios animators. Van der Will wrote that Quintana's animation was "seriously out of this world!" Christophe Foltzer of the website Ecranlarge.com also praised Quintana, emphasising the amount of animation that he did as the video's sole animator. Foltzer wrote that he wanted to see further work from Quintana.
