= Endless Night (The Lion King song) =

Song by Jason Raize and The Lion King Ensemble

from the album The Lion King: Original Broadway Cast Recording
- Released: November 14, 1997
- Length: 4:41
- Label: Walt Disney
- Composers: Lebo M; Hans Zimmer; Jay Rifkin
- Lyricist: Julie Taymor
- Producer: Mark Mancina

"Endless Night" is a song written by Lebo M, Hans Zimmer, Julie Taymor, and Jay Rifkin. It premiered in 1997 as part of the musical The Lion King, a stage adaptation of Disney's 1994 animated feature film. The song was produced by Mark Mancina and arranged by Mark A. Brymer. Taymor wrote the lyrics based on the melody from "Lala", a song from the 1995 soundtrack album Rhythm of the Pride Lands. Jason Raize, who first performed the role of Simba for the Broadway production, first performed and recorded "Endless Night"; his version is included on the original cast recording.

"Endless Night" is a ballad that lyrically deals with Simba grieving the death of his father Mufasa. The song includes vocals by a choir that encourages Simba to move forward. Reception to the song was mainly positive. Some commentators praised how it helped to develop Simba's character. "Endless Night" has been performed in different instances outside the show; Nick Afoa released a version in support of the United Kingdom charity Centrepoint, and Adam Jacobs sang it as part of a mashup with "Proud of Your Boy" at a Theatre Development Fund event.

== Recording and release ==
"Endless Night" was composed by South African composer Lebo M, German composer Hans Zimmer, and American musician Jay Rifkin, and arranged by Mark A. Brymer. American theatre director Julie Taymor composed the lyrics, and had developed "Endless Night" as Simba's signature song for the musical. It was one of ten new songs composed for the musical production of the 1994 Disney animated film The Lion King. The melody was based on "Lala" from the 1995 soundtrack album Rhythm of the Pride Lands. Written in Zulu, "Lala" deals with the loss of a family member. Reflecting on the writing process, Taymor said compositions were selected from Rhythm of the Pride Lands for their mood not their lyrics.

"Endless Night" was first performed and recorded by American actor and singer Jason Raize, who first played the role of Simba for the Broadway show. The original cast recording includes Raize's version of the song, and the accompanying vocalists are called "The Lion King Ensemble". "Endless Night", and the rest of the soundtrack, were recorded at Sony Music Studios in New York City; the music was mixed at The Village in Los Angeles and mastered at Oceanview Digital Mastering in Manhattan Beach, California. American composer Mark Mancina produced the song. The Walt Disney Company released the soundtrack on November 14, 1997, in both cassette and CD formats. It was made available as a digital download in 2006. The Hal Leonard Corporation published and distributed the track.

== Context and composition ==
"Endless Night" is a ballad composed in D major; its instrumentation is provided by piano, synthesizer, guitar, and drums. With a vocal range spanning from the low note of D_{3} to the high note of A_{4}, the song is performed either by a tenor or a baritone, with a choir prominently featured. Tom Millward of the New York Theatre Guide associated the song with folk music. As part of The Lion King's second act, "Endless Night" is performed in a setting the playbill describes as "Under the Sun". To add to the power of the performance, the actor portraying Simba appears alone in front of a cyclorama emphasized by a "bold lighting change". The song's opening lines are sung from a crouched position.

Constructed as a lament and a monologue, the song shows Simba grieving the death of his father Mufasa. Simba sings the song directly to his father; the opening lines are "Hem hem hem. Hem hem. Where has the starlight gone?". The chorus is: "I know that the night must end, and that the sun will rise. I know that the clouds must clear and that the sun will shine." The song focuses on Simba's growth into new responsibilities and his memories of his father's promise to remain with him. He questions whether he should help to reclaim the Pride Lands, and sings to his father: "Whenever I call your name / You're not anywhere." Symbolizing "voices of hope in the night", the choir reminds Simba "even the longest night is followed by sunrise". At the song's conclusion, Simba realizes his father will always guide him. Wei-Huan Chen of the Houston Chronicle said the song contains the core message of The Lion King, "a story about a father and a son, where the son loses the father and must then find his purpose in life".

Some commentators found "Endless Night" to be disconnected from the musical's overall structure. The Houston Chronicle's Everett Evans felt the parts written by Lebo M were at odds with the more pop-oriented songs by Elton John and Tim Rice, saying "the disparity between the two halves leaves some seams showing in the overall score." While discussing a split in the musical's sound and style, Michael Billington wrote: "What is curious about the show is that it borrows from so many different traditions."

== Critical reception ==
Critic response of the song was primarily positive. Praising its placement in the show, The Denver Post's John Moore said "Endless Night" was part of "a wildebeest stampede of ongoing powerful moments". Juliet Pennington of The Sun Chronicle wrote that the song was "emotionally charged and powerful" due to Simba's grief over his father. Identifying "Endless Night" as one of the show's strongest moments, the Toronto Star's Richard Ouzounia praised the choice to only feature the actor on the stage. WLOS' Justin Hinton wrote that "Endless Night" and "He Lives in You (Reprise)" proved that the adult version of Simba had the best musical numbers. Wei-Huan Chen described the track as having "standalone power"; she explained it was an example of how a musical is successful "not through a scene that must be viewed through a narrative context, but rather a creation whose achievement is self-contained". When discussing the songs Mancina, Lebo M, and Zimmer added to the show, the Los Angeles Daily News' Evan Henerson described them as adding a greater "musical excitement". "Endless Night" did receive some criticism. Pam Kragen of The San Diego Union-Tribune dismissed it as boring, and The Herald's Alan Morrison wrote that "Endless Night" and "Shadowland", both written for the theatre, were "more synth-string dated than the others written earlier."

== Live performances and other versions ==
"Endless Night" was included on cast recordings in other languages, including Japanese, Dutch, and German. In 1998, an instrumental version was made available on the jazzy-contemporary album Disney's Instrumental Impressions - 14 Classic Disney Love Songs, and Stage Stars Records released a karaoke version of the song in 2011.

Nick Afoa performed "Endless Night" in 2013 during a successful audition for Simba for an Australian production of The Lion King. While singing it, he thought about his son "who lives across the other side of the world" and "broke down and couldn't carry on". He released his version of the song in 2018 through Disney on Broadway's YouTube page to support the United Kingdom charity Centrepoint. The same year, Afoa sang "Endless Night" at the Lyceum Theatre as part of a Facebook Live event; the performance was uploaded to Disney on Broadway's account.

Adam Jacobs cited "Endless Night" as the most enjoyable aspect of playing Simba in a North American tour version of the show. In 2016, he performed a mashup of "Endless Night" and "Proud of Your Boy" for a Theatre Development Fund event. Josh Tower, who portrayed Simba the longest in the Broadway production, sang "Endless Night" for a 2014 event celebrating African-American history at Upper Dublin High School to a positive audience response. Tower's performance of the song as part of the stage show received positive reviews from critics. Alton Fitzgerald White, who played Mufasa in various American productions of The Lion King, recorded "Endless Night" for his studio album Disney My Way!.

== Credits and personnel ==
- The following credits were adapted from the booklet of The Lion King - Original Broadway Cast Recording:

Management

- The Walt Disney Company

Recording locations

- Sony Music Studios (New York City)
- The Village (Los Angeles)
- Oceanview Digital Mastering (Manhattan Beach)

Credits

- Composers – Hans Zimmer, Jay Rifkin, Julie Taymor, and Lebo M
- Arrangement – Mark A. Brymer
- Production – Mark Mancina
