= The Lion King: Original Motion Picture Soundtrack =

The Lion King: Original Motion Picture Soundtrack may refer to:

- The Lion King (1994 soundtrack)
- The Lion King (2019 soundtrack)
