= Spirit (Beyoncé song) =

Single by Beyoncé

from the album The Lion King: Original Motion Picture Soundtrack and The Lion King: The Gift
- Released: July 10, 2019
- Studio: Jungle Studios (New York, NY); Kings Landing (Los Angeles, CA); MXM Studios (Los Angeles, CA)
- Genre: Gospel
- Length: 4:37
- Label: Walt Disney
- Songwriters: Ilya Salmanzadeh; Timothy Lee McKenzie; Beyoncé
- Producers: Ilya; Beyoncé; Labrinth

Beyoncé singles chronology
"Top Off" (2018)	"Spirit" (2019)	"Brown Skin Girl" (2019)

Music video
- "Spirit" on YouTube

"Spirit" is a song by American singer Beyoncé for the soundtrack of the photorealistic remake of The Lion King and the companion album The Lion King: The Gift. Released on July 10, 2019, it was written and produced by Ilya Salmanzadeh, Labrinth and Beyoncé. Lyrically, the song discusses Simba's, the film's main protagonist's return home and is played during that particular scene in the film. "Spirit" is a gospel ballad that opens with lyrics chanted in Swahili by male choristers.

Upon its release, "Spirit" received positive reviews from music critics, many of whom praised Beyoncé's full vocal range display and the African musical undertones. The song charted at number 98 on the US Billboard Hot 100 and number 6 on the US Hot R&B Songs chart, while also entering the charts in numerous European countries. A music video directed by Jake Nava was filmed at Havasu Falls in Arizona and Apple Valley, California and premiered on July 16, 2019. It shows Beyoncé performing a dancing choreography surrounded by African dancers and choristers in a desert-like environment and features a cameo appearance by her daughter, Blue Ivy Carter. Upon its release, the video was positively received by most critics who praised the scenery of the location and Beyoncé's fashion style.

== Background ==
In a HuffPost interview with Hans Zimmer, he explained that "Spirit" was the final addition to the soundtrack and was initially slotted in for the end credits.

"At the last moment, she comes to the room and shows us a diamond and goes, ‘If you want it, you can have it.'" "Every musician has a habit of when they come into the room to play you something for the first time ... We're all just a little bit nervous how it lands," he said. "Of course, everybody's reaction — we adored it. It was perfect for the film. [...] I suddenly thought, 'No, no, no. This song is a gift. This song does a great bit of storytelling.' ... I just thought, 'Hang on. We should try this at a different spot as opposed to the end title.' I think it will be, if it's in the body of the movie and it's over a crucial scene, I think it will have much more resonance and weight.

The cover art for the single features a shot of Beyoncé's face next to the CGI face of Nala, the character she portrays in the movie.

== Composition and lyrics ==
The song opens with two male backing vocals singing the lines "Uishi kwa muda mrefu mfalme" in Swahili which translate to "Long live the king" in English. These vocals are also featured later throughout the song preserving the song's traditional African choral sound. According to Pitchfork's Michelle Kim, sonically, the song is an amalgam of African music with American South music.

In the film, "Spirit" can be heard during the scene in which Simba goes back home with Nala in the Pride Lands. He has grown up and established friendly relationships with Timon and Pumbaa. Nala, however, convinces him to return home in order to reclaim the throne that rightfully belongs to him and has been taken by Scar who has allowed the hyenas to overrule the kingdom. The song's lyrics are straightforward and in accordance with the scene as they portray the main protagonist's return home in an attempt to rectify the situation.

== International versions ==
At the time of its original theatrical release, the film was released in 44 versions worldwide, with the song "Spirit" counting as many versions overall. Nala's Brazilian Portuguese dubber IZA performed each and every part of the character, except for the song "Spirit" following a contract issue between Warner Music Group and Disney and was replaced by voice-actor Andrezza Massei. She was the only one out of all Nala's dubbers not to perform the song.

"Spirit" worldwide
Language	Performer	Title	Translation
Bulgarian	Кръстина Кокорска (Krastina Kokorska)	"Сила" ("Sila")	"Power"
Cantonese	白珍寶 (Jobelle Ubalde)	"獅子王" ("Si ji wong")	"Lion King"
Croatian	Mateja Majerle	"Nebo"	"The sky"
Czech	Tereza Černochová	"Přilét hlas"	"The voice has come"
Danish	Nellie Ettison	"Løvehjerte"	"Lionheart"
Dutch	April Darby	"Spirit"	
English	Beyoncé	"Spirit"	
Estonian	Liis Lemsalu	"Hing"	"Soul"
Finnish	Paula Vesala	"Voimaa"	"Power"
Flemish	Charlotte Campion	"Spirit"	
French (Canada)	Audrey-Louise Beauséjour	"Pour toi"	"For you"
French (Europe)	Anne Sila	"Pour toi"	"For you"
German	Magdalena Turba	"Trau dich"	"Dare"
Greek	Εύα Τσάχρα (Éva Tsáhra)	"Πνεύμα" ("Pnéuma")	"Spirit"
Hebrew	עדי כהן (Adi Cohen)	"רוח" ("Ruach")	"Spirit"
Hindi	सुनिधि चौहान (Sunidhi Chauhan)	"जी ले" ("Jee le")	"Live your life"
Hungarian	Péter Szabó Szilvia	"Ne várj"	"Don't wait"
Icelandic	Íris Hólm Jónsdóttir	"Andinn"	"Spirit"
Italian	Elisa Toffoli	"Quando il destino chiamerà"	"When fate calls"
Japanese	門山葉子 (Kadoyama Yōko)	"スピリット" ("Supiritto")	
Kazakh	Дария Габдулл (Darııa Ǵabdýl)	"Алға" ("Alğa")	"Forward"
Korean	박송이 (Park Song-i)	"스피릿" ("Seupirit")	
Latvian	Ilze Ķuzule-Skrastiņa	—N/a	—N/a
Lithuanian	Marija Arutiunova	"Dvasia"	"Spirit"
Mandarin Chinese (China)	—N/a	"天地" ("Tiāndì")	"The world"
Mandarin Chinese (Taiwan)	蔡永淳 (Tsai Yung-Chun)	"思念" ("Sīniàn")	"Reminiscence"
Norwegian	Heidi Ruud Ellingsen	"Himmel"	"Sky"
Polish	Zofia Nowakowska	—N/a	—N/a
Portuguese (Brazil)	Andrezza Massei	"Sinta"	"Feel it"
Portuguese (Europe)	Soraia Tavares	"Espírito"	"Spirit"
Romanian	Alina Chinie	"Spirit"	
Russian	Екатерина Ковская (Ekaterina Kovskaya)	"Голос" ("Golos")	"Voice"
Serbian	Лејла Хот (Lejla Hot)	"Небом" ("Nebom")	"Across the sky"
Slovak	Ivana Regešová	"Duch"	"Spirit"
Slovene	Maja Založnik	—N/a	—N/a
Spanish (Europe)	Eva María Cortés	"Espíritu"	"Spirit"
Spanish (Latin America)	Fela Domínguez	"Vive"	"Live"
Swedish	Molly Hammar	"Himlen öppnas"	"The sky opens up"
Tamil	சுனிதா சாரதி (Sunitha Sarathy)	"வா மேலே" ("Van mele")	"Come On Up"
Telugu	Nincy Vincent	"నీవే" ("Neeve")	"You Are"
Thai	วิชญาณี เปียกลิ่น (Wichayanee Pearklin)	"หัวใจ" ("Huachai")	"Heart"
Turkish	Begüm Günceler	"Vahşi"	"Wild"
Ukrainian	Нейба Траоре (Neiba Traore)	"Вічність" ("Vichnistʹ")	"Eternity"
Vietnamese	Phương Vy	"Hào khí thảo nguyên"	"Steppe pride"

== Critical reception ==
"Spirit" received positive reviews from music critics. The Lion King: The Gift was included in Capital XTRA's 20 best albums of 2019 list, whereby "Spirit" was described as a "triumphant, gospel-inspired" track that "firmly cemented Beyoncé at the top of her game". Allegra Frank writing for Vox described the song as "perfect" and "otherworldly good". Winston Cook-Wilson for Spin wrote "The sweeping, anthemic song is a blend of styles that keeps in line both with the spirit of the original animated film's soundtrack songs and Beyonce's characterization of the Gift album." Sandra Gonzalez for CNN described how "in 'Spirit', Beyoncé masterfully showcases her power and vocal acrobatic skills." Raisa Bruner of Time agrees, calling the song "a soaring, gospel-inspired track that shows off Queen Bey's full range", including both the showcasing of "particularly her lower tones" and the "surprising falsetto in the bridge". Mikael Wood for the Los Angeles Times writes that the "grand" song showcases "the natural force of [Beyoncé's] singing". Adina Goldstein and Symphreona Clark also complimented Beyonce's vocal performance, writing for YR Media that it "resembles a large rushing river, beautiful, inspiring and so strong it can shape even the hardest of substances".

Writing for Rolling Stone, Danny Schwartz called the song "wonderful" and complimented the inclusion of Swahili in the track." Jon Pareles for The New York Times also praised "how the African elements are at the core of the music", and described the song as "a dynamic secular-gospel exhortation to 'Rise up!'". Carl Wilson of Slate Magazine described the song as "award-baiting piece of Hollywood-goes-gospel". Robyn Beck for Vanity Fair praised the "ethereal" track, describing it as a "powerful ballad with a sweeping chorus, backed by an echoing choir". Michelle Kim writing for Pitchfork was particularly critical of the song's lyrics, noting that they "err on the side of meaningless" in comparison to the singer's previous projects. Nevertheless, she described the song as "uplifting" and complimented Beyoncé's vocals as "weighty" and "soulful". Kristen Perrone for Elite Daily described "Spirit" as "inspiring" and its lyrics as "particularly powerful", adding that the song has topped "Can You Feel the Love Tonight". Celia Fernandez for The Oprah Magazine called the song "absolutely memorable" and wrote that the song's lyrics perfectly embody Beyoncé's aim of providing a contemporary interpretation of the film through the lens of authentic African music.

== Accolades ==
Year	Award	Category	Result	Ref
2019	Hawaii Film Critics Society	Best Song	Nominated	
2019	Hollywood Music in Media Awards	Best Original Song in a Feature Film	Nominated	
2019	Soul Train Music Awards	Video of the Year	Nominated	
2019	Soul Train Music Awards	Best Dance Performance	Nominated	
2020	Black Reel Awards	Outstanding Original Song	Nominated	
2020	Capri Hollywood International Film Festival	Best Original Song	Won	
2020	Critics' Choice Awards	Best Song	Nominated	
2020	Golden Globe Awards	Best Original Song	Nominated	
2020	Grammy Awards	Best Pop Solo Performance	Nominated	
2020	Grammy Awards	Best Song Written for Visual Media	Nominated	
2020	Guild of Music Supervisors Awards	Best Song Written and/or Recorded for a Film	Nominated	
2020	NAACP Image Awards	Outstanding Song - Traditional	Won	
2020	Satellite Awards	Best Original Song	Nominated	

== Chart performance ==
The single charted at number 98 on the US Billboard Hot 100 and it peaked at number 6 on the US Hot R&B Songs chart. It fared better in Europe, where it entered the top 50 in the Netherlands and Scotland.

== Music video ==
The song's music video was filmed at Havasu Falls, a waterfall in Havasu Creek, located in the Grand Canyon, Arizona, United States. Beyoncé received special permission from the Havasupai tribe to close off the waterfall from the public to allow filming of the music video on July 10. Shooting lasted around five hours, with Knowles arriving and departing from the location via helicopter. The music video premiered during Can You Feel the Love Tonight, an hour-long special hosted by Robin Roberts that aired on ABC Network on July 16, 2019. A second extended cut video was also released on the singer's YouTube channel in which the original music video for "Spirit" was merged with that for another song from the album, "Bigger". According to the singer, the clip was intended to "show how God is the art director".

The clip consists of excerpts from the movie intermingled with scenes of Beyoncé singing the song and dancing in the desert accompanied by male and female dancers and choristers dressed in matching outfits. Blue Ivy Carter, the singer's daughter with rapper Jay-Z makes several cameo appearances throughout the video accompanied by her mother. For one of the looks of the video, the singer dons a dress from Senegal custom-made for her, as well as jewelry by Bosnian brand Werkstatt.

Tosten Burks of Spin magazine found the scenes of the singer dancing in the desert reminiscent of Solange Knowles's short film When I Get Home (2019). A CNN writer praised the aesthetics of the visuals, the inclusion of the singer's daughter and the numerous Easter eggs referencing Africa. In a similar vein, Claire Shaffer, writing for Rolling Stone, praised the landscapes surrounding the filming locations. A writer for Variety complimented the "spectacular, revealing gowns" the singer is dressed in. Likewise, writers for Billboard praised the singer's outfits worn in the videos, noting how they blend in with the surrounding scenery. Several days following the release of the music video for "Spirit", allegations on social media accounts accusing the singer of plagiarism surfaced online. The clip was said to contain similar shots and ideas with La Maison Noir: The Gift and the Curse (2018), a 17-minute film by Rharha Nembhard directed for South African musician Petite Noir. Some of the elements compared in both videos include the singer's clothing, poses and looks. Management teams of both representatives however made no comments on the matter.

A second version (a cappella and studio) and music video were released on Black Is King (2020), a film by Beyoncé.

== Charts ==
Chart (2019–2020)	Peak position
Australia (ARIA)	99
Belgium (Ultratip Bubbling Under Flanders)	1
Belgium (Ultratip Bubbling Under Wallonia)	14
Canada Hot 100 (Billboard)	92
Ireland (IRMA)	65
Netherlands (Dutch Top 40)	27
Netherlands (Single Top 100)	67
New Zealand Hot Singles (RMNZ)	12
Scotland Singles (OCC)	36
Slovakia Airplay (ČNS IFPI)	79
Sweden Heatseeker (Sverigetopplistan)	11
UK Singles (OCC)	59
US Billboard Hot 100	98
US Hot R&B/Hip-Hop Songs (Billboard)	37

== Release history ==
Release dates and formats for "Spirit"
Region	Date	Format(s)	Label	Ref.
Various	July 10, 2019	Digital download; streaming	Walt Disney	
Canada	July 10, 2019	Adult contemporary radio; contemporary hit radio; hot adult contemporary radio	Sony	
Italy	July 12, 2019	Radio airplay	Sony	
United States	July 23, 2019	Urban contemporary radio	Columbia	
