= I Just Can't Wait to Be King =

Song by Jason Weaver with Rowan Atkinson and Laura Williams

from the album The Lion King: Original Motion Picture Soundtrack
- Released: May 31, 1994
- Recorded: 1992
- Genre: Worldbeat
- Length: 2:49
- Label: Walt Disney
- Composer: Elton John
- Lyricist: Tim Rice
- Producer: Mark Mancina

"I Just Can't Wait to Be King" is a 1994 song written by Elton John (music) and Tim Rice (lyrics) for the Disney animated feature film The Lion King (1994). The song was performed in 1992 by American actor and singer Jason Weaver as the singing voice of young Simba, with English actor Rowan Atkinson and American actress Laura Williams providing supporting vocals in their roles as Zazu and the singing voice of young Nala, respectively. It was released June 12, 1994 on The Lion King: Original Motion Picture Soundtrack and a cover by Aaron Carter was featured on the 2002 release of the Disneymania compilation album.

The song was featured in the 2019 film adaptation, performed by JD McCrary, John Oliver, and Shahadi Wright Joseph released June 11, 2019 on The Lion King: Original Motion Picture Soundtrack.

== Elton John single ==
Elton John performed the second version of I Just Can't Wait to Be King as a single.

== Analysis ==
The song is "an ode to youthful arrogance, invincibility, and above all, impatience".

== Critical reception ==
The New York Times Film Reviews 1993–1994 deemed the song to be derivative as well as "cute, lilting [and] safe", and likened the song to Michael Jackson singing "Under the Sea". The Cavalier Daily also compared the song to those from The Little Mermaid, and Popdust compared it to Billy Joel's "River of Dreams".

The New York Times Theater Reviews 1997–1998 felt that the song was "conventionally comic and upbeat". Lakeland Ledger wrote that it is a "dazzling Busby Berkeley-style dancefest" with a "Rockettes kickline". It has been described as "strutting", "bouncy", "grand", and a "hubris-filled fantasy song". News.com deemed it the underdog song of The Lion King, adding "this showstopper about the future didn't get the accolades its brethren received."

Less favorable reviews have described the song as "irritating" and not very "thematically rich". Popdust ranked the song 5 out of 6 songs in the film, and BoingBoing listed it as the 11th best "I Want" song in the Disney repertoire. The Cavalier Daily deemed the Elton John reworking "uneventful and boring".

== Certifications ==
Region	Certification	Certified units/sales
United Kingdom (BPI)	Platinum	600,000^{‡}
United Kingdom (BPI) JD McCrary, Shahadi Wright Joseph, and John Oliver version	Silver	200,000^{‡}
United States (RIAA)	2× Platinum	2,000,000^{‡}
^{‡} Sales+streaming figures based on certification alone.

== Context ==
=== In film ===
"I Just Can't Wait to Be King" is a large contrast from the film's non-musical segments; the onset of the song sees a change from a neutral color palette. The song is performed near the beginning of the film by a young Simba and Nala as to enunciate Simba's desires to become King. It is a prelude to Simba's lost innocence, being tricked into thinking he killed his father, his leaving Pride Rock, and attempt to forget his past.

==== Direct-to-video prequel ====
It also appears in DisneyToon's 2004 direct-to-video followup The Lion King 1½. Timon and Pumbaa are disturbed by some noise from outside of their home, which is actually Simba, Nala, and the animals singing this musical number. Timon is angry and hits the leg of an elephant supporting the tower of animals with a stick. The elephant jumps in surprise and causes the tower to collapse, explaining why it collapses in the original film. Timon and Pumbaa's home is ruined by this event.

=== In musical ===
The song appears in the Broadway show and is performed by Scott Irby-Ranniar, Kajuana Shuford, and Geoff Hoyle on the 1997 Original Cast Recording. In the Spanish language version of The Lion King, "I Just Can't Wait to be King" was performed by the Mexican singer and entertainer Kalimba. Elton John also recorded his own version of the song for the film's soundtrack.
