= The Disney Album =

Studio album by Michael Crawford
- Released: 2001
- Label: Walt Disney
- Producer: Robbie Buchanan; Jay Landers (exec. producer)

Michael Crawford chronology
A Christmas Album / The Most Wonderful Time of the Year (1999)	The Disney Album (2001)	The Best of (2001)

The Disney Album is the eighth studio album by English actor and singer Michael Crawford, released in 2001 by Walt Disney Records. It features Crawford singing songs from various Disney films and musicals, mostly from the 1990s. The album reached number one in Australia.

== Album artwork ==
The front cover of the album depicts Crawford standing in a doorway, with a silhouette of cartoon character Mickey Mouse—mascot of The Walt Disney Company—projected next to him on the wall. According to a section of the album's liner notes which were written by Crawford, the image is based on a photograph taken in the 1930s "of Walt and his favorite friend", discovered in the Disney archives. The original 1930s sepia photograph is shown beside the text in the liner notes.

== Critical reception ==
Professional ratings
Review scores
Source	Rating
AllMusic	4/5 stars
The Daily Vault	C−

In a review of The Disney Album for AllMusic, Jonathan Widran described Crawford as having "one of the most incredible and powerful voices on the planet", and that "the pairing of [his voice] with some of Disney's top songs (mostly from films of recent years) seems a sure bet." Widran went on to say that the album is "beautifully produced", with Crawford being "backed by beautiful strings and a children's choir on "Your Heart Will Lead You Home"". On a slightly more negative note, Widran opined that because Crawford is "so eloquent and perfect, [...] some of the whimsy and edge of the original songs is lost on his versions", singling out "You'll Be in My Heart" as "pleasantly upbeat in an adult contemporary manner, but [lacking] the percussive fire and vocal edge of Phil Collins' take." He also said that "Certain elements of "The Lion King Medley" require a little more grit [...], though he shines on the "Can You Feel the Love Tonight" passage." Crawford is described by Widran as bringing "an emotional power" to "Colors of the Wind", but with "not quite enough of the original spirit", and that he "is much more effective on the simpler ballads like "I Know the Truth" [...] and especially Dumbo's classic "Baby Mine," to which he brings the necessary grace and innocence."

Christopher Thelen from The Daily Vault wrote that "On the surface, Michael Crawford seems to be the obvious choice to cover a collection of classic songs from the Walt Disney library [as he] is the voice who gave life to the title character in The Phantom of the Opera", and that "On paper, it seems like a match made in heaven." However, Thelen opined that on many of the tracks "it almost sounds like he's giving a rote performance", and that Crawford "speaks his way through songs like "Colors of the Wind"; on others like "You'll Be in My Heart," he almost sounds like a lounge singer." Thelen went on to say that "Crawford's heart may have been in the right place when he chose these songs, but he doesn't do the original singers any service", though he singled out "Baby Mine" and "I Know the Truth" as the album's "two lone highlights"; the former being described as "absolutely heart-rendering".

== Track listing ==
No.	Title	Writer(s)	Origin	Length
1.	"Colors of the Wind"	Alan Menken; Stephen Schwartz	Pocahontas	4:22
2.	"When She Loved Me"	Randy Newman	Toy Story 2	3:07
3.	"Your Heart Will Lead You Home"	Kenny Loggins; Richard M. Sherman; Robert B. Sherman	The Tigger Movie	3:52
4.	"You'll Be in My Heart"	Phil Collins	Tarzan	4:41
5.	"If I Never Knew You" (with Sherie Rene Scott)	Menken; Schwartz	Pocahontas	4:21
6.	"Reflection"	Matthew Wilder; David Zippel	Mulan	3:19
7.	"Baby Mine"	Ned Washington; Frank Churchill	Dumbo	2:46
8.	"The Lion King Medley" ("Can You Feel the Love Tonight", "Circle of Life", "He Lives in You", "Shadowland")	Elton John; Tim Rice; Mark Mancina; Jay Rifkin; Lebo M; Hans Zimmer	The Lion King	5:55
9.	"I Know the Truth"	John; Rice	Aida	4:34
10.	"I Will Go Sailing No More"	Newman	Toy Story	3:03

== Personnel ==
Adapted from the album's liner notes.

=== Musicians ===
- Michael Crawford – vocals (all tracks)
- Sherie Rene Scott – vocals (track 5)
- Robbie Buchanan – keyboards, piano, bass, drums
- Dick Bolks – music preparation
- Joani Bye – backing vocals
- Tania Hancheroff – backing vocals
- The Irish Film Orchestra – orchestra; orchestra management: Catriona Walsh
- Kofi – African vocals
- Bob Krogstad – orchestral arrangements
- Henri Lorieau – backing vocals
- Gordon Maxwell – backing vocals
- MQ Singers (Aubrey Buchanan, Katrina Dekur, Kirsten Dekur, Danielle Fleck, Stefanie Gordo, Kyra Huntington, Kaeli McArter, Colleen Murphy, Samantha Russell) – children's choir; directed by Monique Creber
- Brian Newcombe – electric bass
- Peter Padden – backing vocals
- Rafael Padilla – percussion
- Kamil Rustam – guitar
- Warren Stanyer – backing vocals
- Beverly Staunton – backing vocals
- David Steele – backing vocals
- Michael Thompson – guitar

=== Technical ===
- Andrew Boland – additional engineering (assisted by Kieran Lynch & Emma Jane Lennon)
- Robbie Buchanan – producer
- Savina Ciaramella – A&R administration
- Koji Egawa – mix assistant
- Larry Eikleberry – illustration
- Scott Erickson – recording, production coordination
- Luis M. Fernandez – album art direction
- Tim Hale – photography
- Nick Hard – additional engineering
- David Kreisberg – additional engineering
- Jay Landers – executive producer
- Dani Markman – A&R coordination
- Matt Marteinsson – additional engineering
- Kelvin Nguyen – album design
- Doug Sax – mastering
- Bill Schnee – mixing
- John Webster – additional engineering (assisted by Pat Sharman)
- Marcella Wong – album design
- Recorded at The Hop & David Abell Pianos in Los Angeles, California; Hop North, Greenhouse & Blue Wave in Vancouver, British Columbia; Windmill Lane in Dublin, Ireland; Right Track in New York City, New York.

== Charts ==
Chart performance for The Disney Album
Chart (2001)	Peak position
Australian Albums (ARIA)	1
New Zealand Albums (RMNZ)	2
UK Albums (OCC)	76

== Certifications ==
Region	Certification	Certified units/sales
Australia (ARIA)	Platinum	70,000^{^}
^{^} Shipments figures based on certification alone.
