= The Lion King (2019 soundtrack) =

2019 soundtrack album by Elton John, Tim Rice and Hans Zimmer

The Lion King: Original Motion Picture Soundtrack

Soundtrack album by Elton John, Tim Rice, Hans Zimmer and various artists
- Released: July 11, 2019
- Length: 77:32
- Label: Walt Disney
- Producers: Pharrell Williams; Hans Zimmer (exec.); Elton John; Greg Kurstin

Elton John chronology
Rocketman: Music from the Motion Picture (2019)	The Lion King: Original Motion Picture Soundtrack (2019)	Elton: Jewel Box (2020)

Hans Zimmer chronology
Dark Phoenix (2019)	The Lion King (2019)	Rebuilding Paradise (2020)

Singles from The Lion King
- 1. "Spirit" Released: July 10, 2019

The Lion King: Original Motion Picture Soundtrack is the soundtrack for the 2019 photorealistic CGI remake of Disney's 1994 animated feature film of the same name. It features songs from the original film written by Elton John and Tim Rice and performed by the film's cast. It also features the score composed by Hans Zimmer, the original film's composer, and two new songs: "Spirit," written by Beyoncé, Labrinth, and Ilya Salmanzadeh and performed by Beyoncé, and the end-credit song "Never Too Late", written by John and Rice and performed by John. Beyoncé also produced a curated soundtrack titled The Lion King: The Gift, which features new songs performed by multiple artists. The Lion King: Original Motion Picture Soundtrack was digitally released on July 11, 2019, and both the soundtrack's CD and Beyoncé's album were released on July 19, 2019.

== Background ==
On September 28, 2016, it was announced that Jon Favreau would direct a remake of Disney's The Lion King, and that it would feature songs from the original film by Elton John and Tim Rice. On November 1, 2017, it was announced that the original film's composer, Hans Zimmer, who had also composed additional music for Favreau's Iron Man, would return to score the film. Zimmer initially hesitated to return for the remake, arguing that "[he has] worked very hard to not ruin things through improvement." However, he agreed to compose the remake after performing the original film's score in a concert, saying that he "suddenly realized what [his] place in this new version was: to try a big experiment and use [his] band and orchestra, go back to Africa, work with Lebo and the chorus and extraordinary musicians from all over the world, and really make this a performance". Zimmer treated his work on the remake similar to his work on the original film, stating that "[He is] doing this strictly for the people for whom it means something. [He is] working [his] musicians to the bone because [he] wants to get that performance. [He wanted] to smell sweat and blood in [the] studio". However, he also had a different approach to the score than the original film, trying to "rehearse and record the score like a live concert performance".

On November 28, 2017, it was reported that Elton John had signed onto the project to rework his musical compositions from the original film before retiring. The following day, it was reported that Beyoncé would assist John in the soundtrack's re-work. On February 18, 2018, it was reported that four songs from the original film would be included: "Circle of Life", "I Just Can't Wait to Be King", "Hakuna Matata", and "Can You Feel the Love Tonight", the latter being performed by Beyoncé (Nala), Donald Glover (Simba), Seth Rogen (Pumbaa), and Billy Eichner (Timon). On February 3, 2019, it was reported that "Be Prepared" would be featured in the film as well. Favreau described the experience of "not trying to create new songs but trying to build on what people remember and love about the old ones" as something "really fun and formative". The score and the songs in the remake were influenced by the music featured in the Broadway version of The Lion King, as Favreau felt that "[Zimmer and John] really [explored] further what the roots of the music are [in the Broadway show]".

Of the five songs of the original, the fate of "Be Prepared" was the one which was most debated when creating the film's soundtrack. Favreau felt that the original sequence, which he compared to the Night on Bald Mountain segment of Fantasia, would clash too heavily with the remake's tone and characterization of Scar. Favreau considered cutting the song and had screenwriter Jeff Nathanson create a spoken word monologue to replace it, but was unsatisfied since he knew how important a villain song is to a Disney film. He asked Zimmer if any sort of musical version of the song could still be a part of the film; Favreau subsequently asked Tim Rice if he could update the song's lyrics to reflect Scar's new dynamic with the hyenas. Rice did so, and the final version of the song is a mix of the monologue Nathanson penned (from "Mufasa has always shown too much restraint when it comes to hunting" to "the need for a diff'rnt dream"), Rice's old and new lyrics, and new score created by Zimmer. Favreau opined that while it wasn't the full song, it would give the audiences the impression that they had still seen the sequence in the remake, and cited the final shot of Scar on a peak with a crescent moon behind him as a key image he had to keep for the film.

On February 9, 2018, John revealed that he, Rice and Beyoncé would create a new song for the film's end credits. However, the collaboration between John and Beyoncé did not pan out as their unreleased song was not added to the official soundtrack. John and Rice wrote a new song for the end credits, titled "Never Too Late" and performed by John.

"Spirit", the new song, performed by Beyoncé and written by Beyoncé, Ilya Salmanzadeh and Labrinth, was originally intended for the end credits, but Favreau revealed that the song would be featured in the film itself. Favreau said that Beyoncé "wrote [the song] in the spirit of the production along with working with Lebo M, who's part of it with Hans Zimmer" and felt "it was nice of them to have them working with her to allow the new song to feel organically a part of the new production". Zimmer later said he made the decision to move "Spirit" into the body of the film. "Spirit" was released as a single on July 10, 2019.

The film also features a cover of The Tokens' "The Lion Sleeps Tonight", performed by Rogen and Eichner, as well as the song "He Lives in You" from Rhythm of the Pride Lands and the Broadway production, performed by Lebo M. Pharrell Williams produced five songs for the film. The soundtrack, featuring Zimmer's score and the film's various existing and new songs, was released digitally on July 11, 2019, and physically on July 19, 2019.

In October 2019, John heavily criticized the soundtrack, saying in full, "The new version of The Lion King was a huge disappointment to me, because I believe they messed the music up. Music was so much a part of the original and the music in the current film didn't have the same impact. The magic and joy were lost. The soundtrack hasn't had nearly the same impact in the charts that it had 25 years ago, when it was the bestselling album of the year. The new soundtrack fell out of the charts so quickly, despite the massive box-office success. I wish I'd been invited to the party more, but the creative vision for the film and its music was different this time around and I wasn't really welcomed or treated with the same level of respect. That makes me extremely sad. I'm so happy that the right spirit for the music lives on with the Lion King stage musical."

== Track listing ==
All tracks are written by Elton John and Tim Rice, except where noted. All scores are composed by Hans Zimmer.

No.	Title	Performer(s)	Length
1.	"Circle of Life/Nants' Ingonyama"	Lindiwe Mkhize, Lebo M. and South African Chorus	4:05
2.	"Life's Not Fair" (score)	Hans Zimmer	1:47
3.	"Rafiki's Fireflies" (score)	Hans Zimmer	1:56
4.	"I Just Can't Wait to Be King"	JD McCrary, Shahadi Wright Joseph and John Oliver	3:38
5.	"Elephant Graveyard" (score)	Hans Zimmer	6:41
6.	"Be Prepared" (2019)	Chiwetel Ejiofor	2:07
7.	"Stampede" (score)	Hans Zimmer	7:50
8.	"Scar Takes the Throne" (score)	Hans Zimmer	2:51
9.	"Hakuna Matata"	Billy Eichner, Seth Rogen, JD McCrary and Donald Glover	4:16
10.	"Simba Is Alive!" (score)	Hans Zimmer	3:39
11.	"The Lion Sleeps Tonight" (writers: Luigi Creatore, Hugo Peretti, George David Weiss and Solomon Linda)	Billy Eichner and Seth Rogen	1:29
12.	"Can You Feel the Love Tonight"	Beyoncé, Donald Glover, Billy Eichner and Seth Rogen	3:06
13.	"Reflections of Mufasa" (score)	Hans Zimmer	5:12
14.	"Spirit" (writers: ILYA, Labrinth and Beyoncé)	Beyoncé	4:37
15.	"Battle for Pride Rock" (score)	Hans Zimmer	11:02
16.	"Remember" (score)	Hans Zimmer feat. Ensemble and Lebo M	3:14
17.	"Never Too Late"	Elton John	4:13
18.	"He Lives in You" (writers: Mark Mancina, Jay Rifkin and Lebo M)	Lebo M	5:10
19.	"Mbube" (written by Linda)	Lebo M	1:57
Total length:			77:32

== Charts ==
=== Weekly charts ===
Chart (2019)	Peak position
Australian Albums (ARIA)	3
Austrian Albums (Ö3 Austria)	15
Belgian Albums (Ultratop Flanders)	7
Belgian Albums (Ultratop Wallonia)	28
Canadian Albums (Billboard)	18
Dutch Albums (Album Top 100)	10
French Albums (SNEP)	35
German Albums (Offizielle Top 100)	32
Japanese Albums (Oricon)	49
New Zealand Albums (RMNZ)	5
Norwegian Albums (VG-lista)	28
Polish Albums (ZPAV)	22
South Korean Albums (Gaon)	12
Spanish Albums (PROMUSICAE)	27
Swiss Albums (Schweizer Hitparade)	16
US Billboard 200	13
US Soundtrack Albums (Billboard)	2

=== Year-end charts ===
Chart (2019)	Position
Australian Albums (ARIA)	95
Belgian Albums (Ultratop Flanders)	89
US Soundtrack Albums (Billboard)	24

== The Lion King: The Gift ==
On July 9, 2019, it was revealed that Beyoncé produced and curated an album titled The Lion King: The Gift, which features new songs inspired by the film, as well as "Spirit" from the soundtrack. Beyoncé called the album "sonic cinema" and said that the film "is a new experience of storytelling", and that the album "is influenced by everything from R&B, pop, hip hop and Afrobeats". Beyoncé also said that "[she] wanted to put everyone on their own journey to link the storyline" and that the songs were inspired by the remake's storyline, which "gives the listener a chance to imagine their own imagery, while listening to a new contemporary interpretation". The songs were also produced by African producers, which Beyoncé said was because "authenticity and heart were important to [her]", since the film is set in Africa. Cameroonian singer/producer Salatiel also featured on the album. Some other African musicians featured on the album include Ghana's Shatta Wale, Nigeria's Wizkid, Burna Boy, Yemi Alade, Mr Eazi, Tiwa Savage and Tekno.
