= Be Prepared (song) =

Song from Disney's The Lion King

Song by Jeremy Irons with Whoopi Goldberg, Cheech Marin and Jim Cummings

from the album The Lion King: Original Motion Picture Soundtrack
- Released: May 31, 1994
- Recorded: 1992
- Length: 3:40
- Label: Walt Disney
- Composer: Elton John
- Lyricist: Tim Rice
- Producers: Hans Zimmer; Ted Kryczko

"Be Prepared" is a 1994 song written by Elton John and Tim Rice (music and lyrics, respectively) from Disney's 1994 animated feature film The Lion King. The song was originally performed in this film by Jeremy Irons and Jim Cummings, with Whoopi Goldberg and Cheech Marin providing supporting vocals.

The song is also featured in Disney's 1997 Broadway stage musical The Lion King, with John Vickery, Kevin Cahoon, Stanley Wayne Mathis, and Tracy Nicole Chapman performing it in the original Broadway cast for the musical. Chiwetel Ejiofor performed an altered version of the song in Disney's 2019 photorealistic remake.

== The Lion King ==
The song is performed as a musical number by Scar, who covets his brother Mufasa's position as king of the Pride Lands. Scar plans to murder both Mufasa and his son, Simba, so he can usurp the throne. He sings to an army of spotted hyenas, promising to end their hunger in return for their assistance.

=== Production ===
Originally, the song (first called "Thanks to Me") was about Scar introducing the hyenas to the lionesses after he pronounced himself king. This idea was eventually scrapped and replaced with "Be Prepared". A reprise of the song after Mufasa's death was also cut from the film, but is featured in the musical version. At the beginning of the second verse, an army of hyenas is shown goose-stepping in front of Scar, who is perched on an overlooking cliff, in resemblance of Adolf Hitler, with upwards of 22 beams of light pointing straight up (resembling the Cathedral of Light featured in many of the Nuremberg Rallies). Shadows cast onto the cliff evoke for a brief second monumental columns. This is modeled after footage from Leni Riefenstahl's Nazi propaganda movie Triumph of the Will.

Though Jeremy Irons is credited for performing Scar's singing voice, Jim Cummings (credited as the voice of Ed the hyena) has stated that he sang in Irons' stead. The film's 2017 Blu-ray release includes footage of Irons singing the entire first verse and some second verse stanzas before the finale; Cummings has claimed that he sang "the last third" of the song, due to Irons developing vocal problems during the recording session.

On May 25, 2024, Jeremy Irons performed "Be Prepared" live for the 30th anniversary of The Lion King at the Hollywood Bowl.

=== Original recording ===
On the original soundtrack recording, Scar opens the song with a soliloquy:

I never thought hyenas essential. They're crude and unspeakably plain. But maybe they've a glimmer of potential if allied to my vision and brain.

In the film, this is cut and the song begins immediately. This was due to a plot adjustment. The soliloquy had Scar considering using the hyenas for his plot, and in the final version of the story, he had already used the hyenas in his plans before the song. The soliloquy is, however, included in the Broadway version.

=== Deleted reprises ===
During early production of the film, there was a reprise created of the song, taking place after Scar has assumed power over the Pride Lands. During a conversation with Zazu, he decides to find a mate and tries seducing Nala, who refuses his advances and is therefore banished by Scar. He then unleashes the hyenas upon the Pride Lands as his "executive staff". A second version of the reprise was also considered to be sung during Mufasa's funeral (this variation is included as a special supplement on the laserdisc edition of the film and was also featured on the Broadway musical). Both versions of the reprise were ultimately removed from the film and the concept of the first version was later recycled in "The Madness of King Scar" and was included in the Broadway musical version of the film.

== The Lion King 1½ ==
In DisneyToon's 2004 direct-to-video film The Lion King 1½, the music from the beginning of the song is briefly heard as Timon and Pumbaa tour Scar's lair as a possible new home, commenting on how it is quiet, secluded and with no uninvited visitors. The shadows of the goose-stepping hyena army are then seen marching in front of them, though they haven't started singing yet. Timon and Pumbaa stare at them for a few seconds, and remark that the hyenas "ain't the traveling company of Riverdance". They then perform an Irish step dance as they exit the scene.

== The Lion King (2019) ==
"Be Prepared (2019 Version)"

Song by Chiwetel Ejiofor

from the album The Lion King: Original Motion Picture Soundtrack
- Released: June 11, 2019
- Length: 2:03
- Label: Walt Disney
- Composer: Elton John
- Lyricist: Tim Rice
- Producers: Hans Zimmer; Jon Favreau; David Fleming

In April 2019, Favreau confirmed that "Be Prepared" would be one of the songs featured in the 2019 remake of The Lion King. On June 24, 2019, the remake was confirmed to feature a reworked version of the song. In the film proper, Scar (voiced by Chiwetel Ejiofor) performs an abridged, primarily spoken-word version of the song, in a darker tone than that of the 1994 film.

== Festival of the Lion King ==
In Walt Disney World's Animal Kingdom's Festival of the Lion King, Kiume sings the song while the theater takes on a darker tone with the male dancers carrying spears and shields, while the female dancers dance with streamers. After Kiume sings the first verse, the solo hyena performer does a tribal dance with a fire torch. In the finale, when the snippet of "Be Prepared" is sung, the hyena comes back out but dances with blades.

== Reception ==
=== Original version ===
The song has garnered positive reactions and reviews. Becky Fuller from Screen Rant gave the song's original version a positive review. She describes the song as "camp, fun, and just scary enough to make younger viewers feel a little on edge" and perfectly summed up Scar's character. She praised Jeremy Irons' performance, citing his deep, baritone tones is perfect for the song. Glen Weldon from NPR also praised the song as indelible and iconic for its pure expression of Scar's character. Hannah-Rose Yee from Stylist cited Be Prepared as one of the best songs in the film for mixing humor and tragedy in the lyrics that build up the character's deluded aspiration and twisted desire.

==== Certifications ====
Region	Certification	Certified units/sales
United Kingdom (BPI)	Silver	200,000^{‡}
United States (RIAA)	Gold	500,000^{‡}
^{‡} Sales+streaming figures based on certification alone.

=== 2019 remake ===
The version of the song featured on the remake received a mixed reaction. Fuller criticized the 2019 remake of the song, commenting "it feels like Scar is merely relaying some information to audiences that could have been delivered in a speech" and felt it would have been better if the song is not included at all. Similarly, Weldon criticized the song for cutting most of the verses, commenting the song sounds more like "if the Boy Scouts imposed martial law" and makes Scar's character like "a mere feckless politician attempting to sway a potential ally".
