= Lodown Magazine =

- Editor: Thomas Marecki
- Frequency: 5 times a year
- Circulation: 40,000
- Founder: Thomas Marecki
- Founded: 1995
- Final issue: May 2016
- Country: Germany
- Based in: Berlin
- Language: English
- Website: Lodown Magazine www.lodownmagazine.com
- ISSN: 1864-8185

Lodown Magazine is a quarterly arts and culture magazine founded in 1995, featuring primarily articles on popular culture and boardsports. The magazine was published in landscape format and each issue had a unique design and font. The final issue appeared in May 2016.

== History and profile ==
In 1995 Thomas Marecki aka 'Marok' founded Lodown in Berlin, Germany, and developed it as an influential visual component of the international skateboard, surfing and graffiti scene. The magazine also featured contemporary art, music, film, fashion, lifestyle and literature. The magazine won LeadAwards in 2003, 2004, 2007 and 2011.

Lodown Magazine was published bimonthly, with a worldwide circulation of 40,000 copies in 2013.

Since 2006 a number of designers guested on individual issues including Kaws, Futura 2000, Eric Haze, Matt Irving, Mirko Borsche, Don Pendleton, Åbäke, Manuel Bürger and de:Marc Brandenburg.

From 2008 to 2015 there was an annual edition themed exclusively on the subject of modern art.
