= Nick Afoa =

New Zealand tenor

Nick Afoa (born 1986 in Auckland) is a New Zealand tenor and former New Zealand age grade rugby union footballer of Samoan and Croatian heritage.

== Early life ==
He grew up in Māngere and Papatoetoe. He was educated at Calvin Christian School, St Peter's College and King's College. He was a prominent junior rugby union footballer in Auckland Rugby. He was selected for the NZ Secondary Schools (2003/2004), NZ Under 17’s (2002) as well as many Regional representative teams. He played club rugby for the Ponsonby Rugby Football Union club in central Auckland. In 2004 he was selected for the NZ U19 World Cup team in South Africa when the NZ U19 side won that tournament. He was also contracted to the Auckland Rugby Football Union as a member of their High Performance Unit. He stopped playing rugby after a torn ACL. Afoa studied social sciences at Auckland University where he gained his Bachelor of Arts before helping to deliver a programme to South Auckland teens who had been affected by drugs and alcohol, using music as a therapeutic tool.

== Career ==
As a singer, Afoa was a soloist for the Rugby World Cup Choir who performed the National Anthems (for their respective countries) at the 2003 Rugby World Cup in Australia. In Auckland he performed at Christmas in the Park in 2003, Sky City Symphony Under the Stars in 2004, and has been the National Anthem singer for other international rugby sides. In 2013 he was cast (for a season due to last into 2015) as Simba in a Sydney musical production of Disney's The Lion King, a role he last auditioned in 2004. He was cast to play Simba in London’s West End musical The Lion King in 2016. His first performance in London was on 10 May 2016; and his last performance was on 14 March 2020. He recently played John in the Australian production of Miss Saigon. In 2024, he played Tom Collins in an Australian tour of Rent.
