= Geoff Hoyle =

English actor

Geoff Hoyle (born 15 April 1946) is an English performer who originated the role of Zazu in the Broadway theatre production of The Lion King. Hoyle has also performed in vaudeville shows, worked with Bill Irwin in "The Pickle Family Circus", performed with Cirque Du Soleil's Nouvelle Expérience, and performed with the Revels.

In 2002, Hoyle performed in "Feast of Fools" at the La Jolla Playhouse in San Diego, California.

In 2007, Hoyle performed in Teatro ZinZanni in both its Seattle, Washington and San Francisco, California venues.

Geoff's son Dan Hoyle is a theater actor in San Francisco and New York.
