= Stanley Wayne Mathis =

American actor, singer, and dancer

- Occupations: Actor; singer; dancer
- Years active: 1987–present

Stanley Wayne Mathis is an American actor, singer, and dancer. He played the character Schroeder in the 1999 revival of Clark Gesner's You're A Good Man, Charlie Brown.

== Career ==
Mathis played Paul in the revival of Kiss Me, Kate. Additional Broadway credits include the revival of Wonderful Town, Jelly's Last Jam, and Oh, Kay!.

In 1997, Mathis appeared as Banzai in the original Broadway cast of The Lion King, a musical adaptation of the 1994 Disney animated film of the same name.

In 2009, he was in a Yale Repertory production of Death of a Salesman by Arthur Miller, playing the role of Stanley.

He starred on Broadway in the musical comedy Nice Work if You Can Get It costarring Matthew Broderick and Kelli O'Hara.

He starred in The Book of Mormon on Broadway as Mafala Hatimbi succeeding Michael Potts.

In October through November 2023, he starred playing the role of Meyer Wolfsheim in Paper Mill Playhouse's world premiere of The Great Gatsby, an adaption of the Fitzgerald novel of the same name.
