= The Lion King (2019 film) =

2019 film by Jon Favreau

- Theatrical release poster
- Directed by: Jon Favreau
- Screenplay by: Jeff Nathanson
- Based on: Disney's The Lion King by: Irene Mecchi; Jonathan Roberts; Linda Woolverton
- Produced by: Jon Favreau; Jeffrey Silver; Karen Gilchrist
- Starring: Donald Glover; Seth Rogen; Chiwetel Ejiofor; Alfre Woodard; Billy Eichner; John Kani; John Oliver; Beyoncé Knowles-Carter; James Earl Jones
- Cinematography: Caleb Deschanel
- Edited by: Mark Livolsi; Adam Gerstel
- Music by: Hans Zimmer
- Production companies: Walt Disney Pictures; Fairview Entertainment
- Distributed by: Walt Disney Studios; Motion Pictures
- Release dates: July 9, 2019 (Hollywood); July 19, 2019 (United States)
- Running time: 118 minutes
- Country: United States
- Language: English
- Budget: $250–260 million
- Box office: $1.662 billion

The Lion King is a 2019 American musical drama film that is a photorealistically animated remake of the traditionally animated 1994 film. Directed by Jon Favreau, written by Jeff Nathanson, and produced by Walt Disney Pictures and Fairview Entertainment, the film stars the voices of Donald Glover, Seth Rogen, Chiwetel Ejiofor, Alfre Woodard, Billy Eichner, John Kani, John Oliver, Florence Kasumba, Eric André, Keegan-Michael Key, JD McCrary, Shahadi Wright Joseph, with Beyoncé Knowles-Carter, and James Earl Jones (reprising his voice role as Mufasa for the final time). The story follows a young lion prince named Simba, who is exiled from his kingdom after his father Mufasa is murdered by his uncle Scar to seize the throne. As he grows up, Simba must decide whether to return home to confront Scar and reclaim his place as king.

Plans for a remake of 1994's The Lion King were confirmed in September 2016 following box office successes for Disney remakes such as The Jungle Book (2016). Favreau was inspired by certain roles of characters in the Broadway adaptation and developed upon elements of the original film's story. Much of the main cast signed on in early 2017, and principal photography began in mid-2017 on a blue screen stage in Los Angeles. The virtual reality tools utilized in The Jungle Book's cinematography were used to a greater degree during the filming of The Lion King. Composers Hans Zimmer, Elton John, and lyricist Tim Rice returned to compose the score alongside Knowles-Carter, who assisted John in the reworking of the soundtrack and wrote a new song for the film, "Spirit", which she also performed. With a production budget of $250–260 million, the film is one of the most expensive films ever made, as well as one of the most expensive Disney remakes.

The Lion King premiered in Hollywood, Los Angeles on July 9, 2019, and was theatrically released in the United States on July 19, in the Dolby Cinema, RealD 3D, and IMAX formats. The film received mixed reviews from critics, with many criticizing the lack of originality and for being nearly identical to the original. However, it grossed over $1.6 billion worldwide during its theatrical run, and broke several box-office records, including becoming the highest-grossing animated film of all time from August 2019 to September 2024, the seventh-highest-grossing film at the time of its release, and the second-highest-grossing film of 2019. The film received nominations for Best Animated Feature Film and Original Song categories at the 77th Golden Globe Awards and 25th Critics' Choice Awards. It was also nominated at 73rd British Academy Film Awards and 92nd Academy Awards, both for visual effects. A follow-up, Mufasa: The Lion King, a film which serves as both a prequel and a sequel, was directed by Barry Jenkins and released on December 20, 2024.

== Plot ==
In the Pride Lands of Tanzania, a pride of lions rule over the kingdom from Pride Rock. King Mufasa and Queen Sarabi's newborn son, Simba, is presented to the gathering animals by Rafiki the mandrill, the kingdom's shaman and advisor. Mufasa's younger brother, Scar, covets the throne.

Mufasa shows Simba the Pride Lands and forbids him from exploring beyond its borders. He explains to Simba the responsibilities of kingship and the "circle of life", which connects all living things. Scar manipulates Simba into exploring an elephant graveyard beyond the Pride Lands. There, Simba and his best friend, Nala, are chased by a clan of spotted hyenas led by the ruthless Shenzi. Mufasa is alerted by his majordomo, the hornbill Zazu, and rescues the cubs. Though disappointed with Simba for disobeying him and endangering himself and Nala, Mufasa forgives him. He explains that the great kings of the past watch over them from the night sky, from which he will one day watch over Simba. Scar visits the hyenas and convinces them to help him kill Mufasa and Simba in exchange for hunting rights in the Pride Lands.

Scar sets a trap for Simba and Mufasa. He lures Simba into a gorge and signals the hyenas to drive a large herd of wildebeest into a stampede to trample him. Scar alerts Mufasa, who saves Simba and tries to escape the gorge; he begs for Scar's help, but Scar betrays Mufasa by throwing him into the stampede to his death. Scar then deceives Simba into believing that Mufasa's death was his fault and tells him to leave the kingdom and never return. He then orders the hyenas to kill Simba, who escapes. Unaware of Simba's survival, Scar tells the pride that the stampede killed both Mufasa and Simba, and steps forward as the new king, allowing the hyenas into the Pride Lands.

Simba collapses in a desert but is rescued by two outcasts, a meerkat and a warthog named Timon and Pumbaa. Simba grows up with his two new friends in their oasis, living a carefree life under their motto "hakuna matata" ("no worries" in Swahili). Meanwhile, Scar attempts to convince Sarabi to be his queen, but she refuses. Years later, an adult Simba rescues Timon and Pumbaa from a hungry lioness, who is revealed to be Nala. Simba and Nala fall in love, and she urges him to return home, telling him that the Pride Lands have become drought-stricken under Scar's reign. Still feeling guilty over Mufasa's death, Simba refuses and leaves angrily. He encounters Rafiki, who tells Simba that Mufasa's spirit lives on in him. Simba is visited by the spirit of Mufasa in the night sky, who tells him that he must take his place as king. Simba decides to return to the Pride Lands.

Aided by his friends, Simba sneaks past the hyenas at Pride Rock and confronts Scar, who shames Simba over his supposed role in Mufasa's death. Scar then reveals to Simba that he killed Mufasa. Enraged, Simba retaliates and forces Scar to confess the truth to the pride. A battle ensues between Simba and his allies and the hyenas. Scar attempts to escape, but is cornered by Simba at a ledge near the top of Pride Rock. Scar begs for mercy and attempts to deceive Simba by blaming his actions on the hyenas. Simba spares Scar's life but orders him to leave the Pride Lands forever; Scar refuses and attacks Simba. Following a brief battle, Simba throws Scar off the ledge. Scar survives the fall, but the hyenas, who overheard him betraying them, attack and maul him to death.

With Scar and the hyenas gone, Simba takes his place as king, and Nala becomes his queen. With the Pride Lands restored, Rafiki presents Simba and Nala's newborn cub to the assembled animals, thus continuing the circle of life.

== Voice cast ==
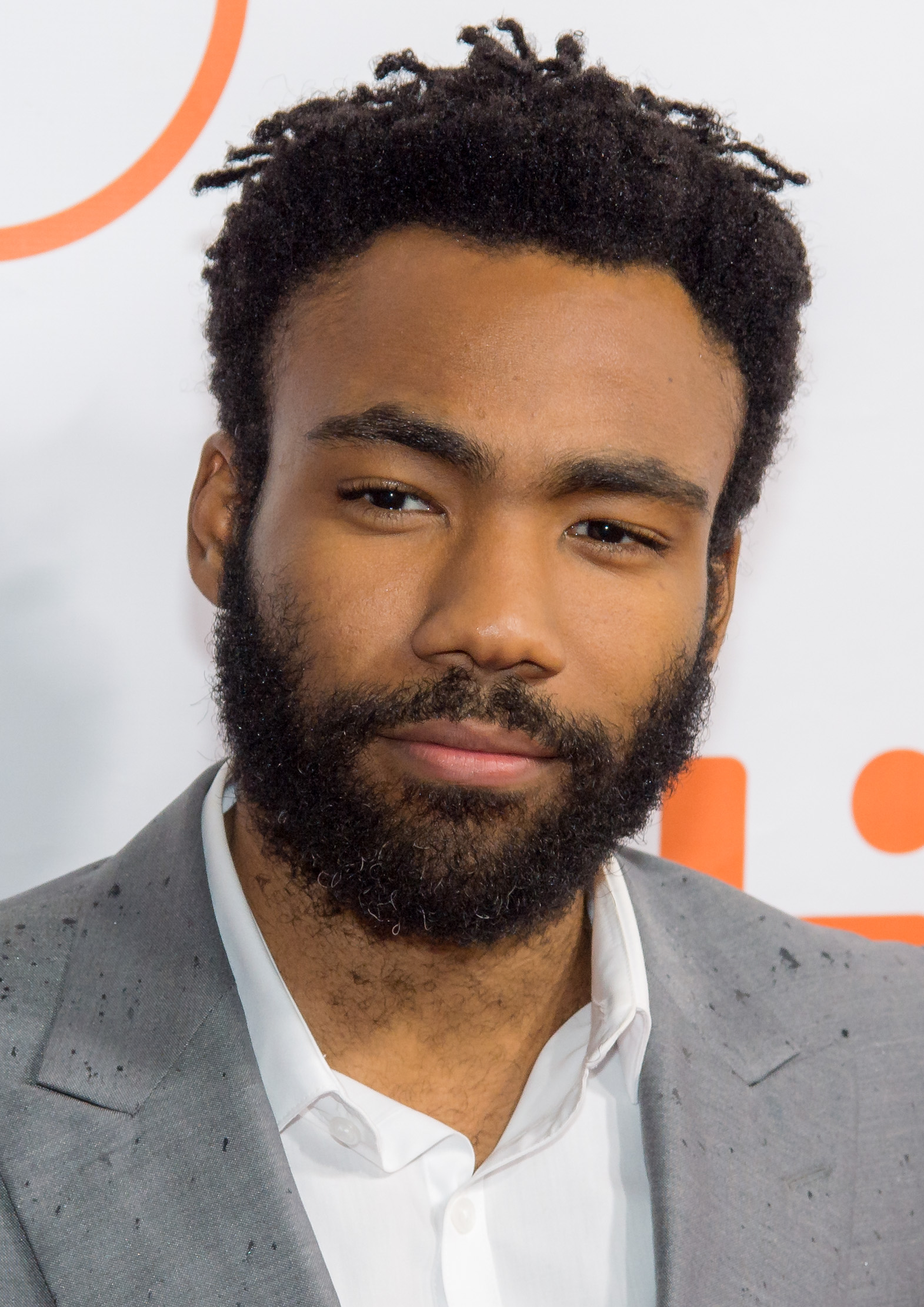
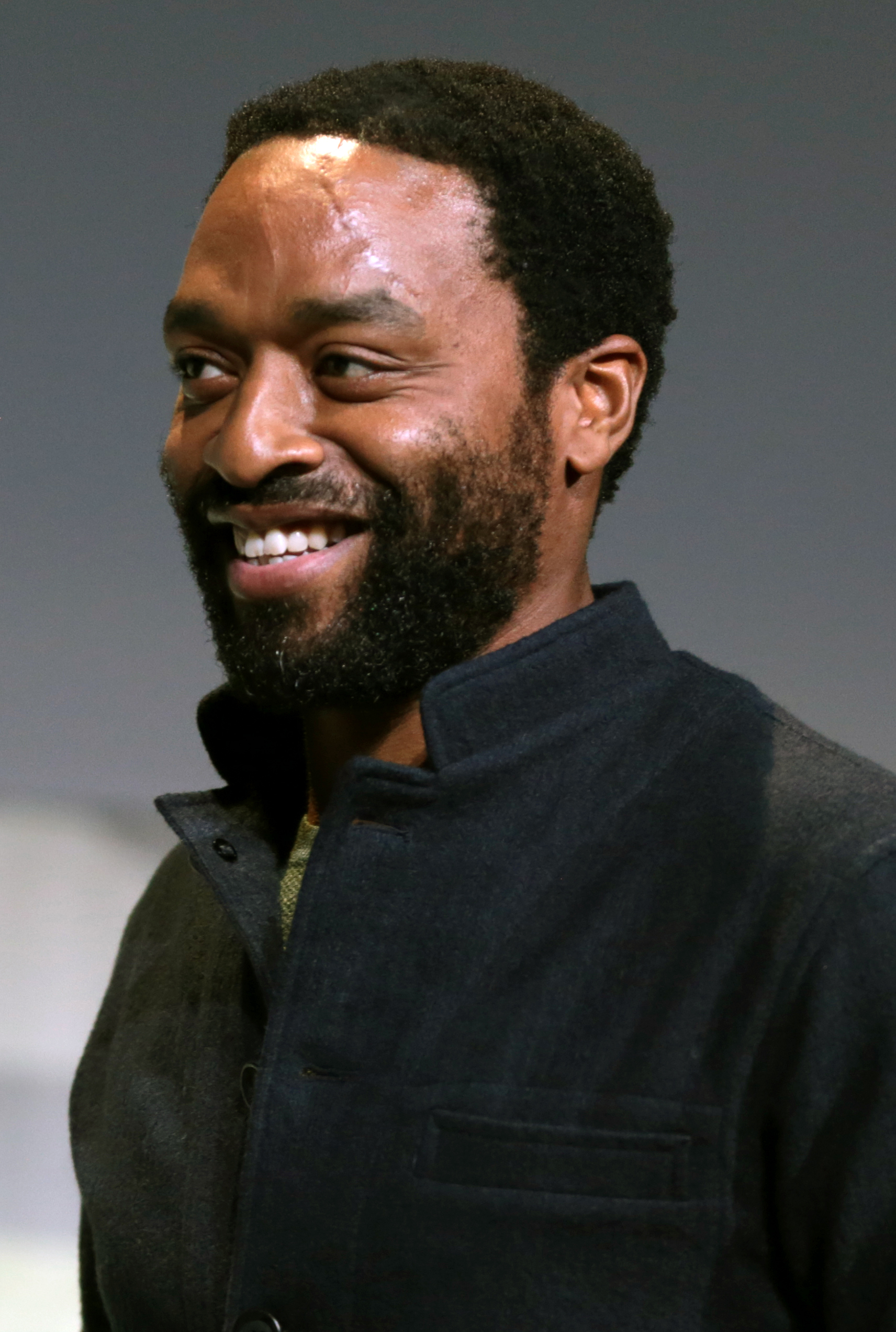
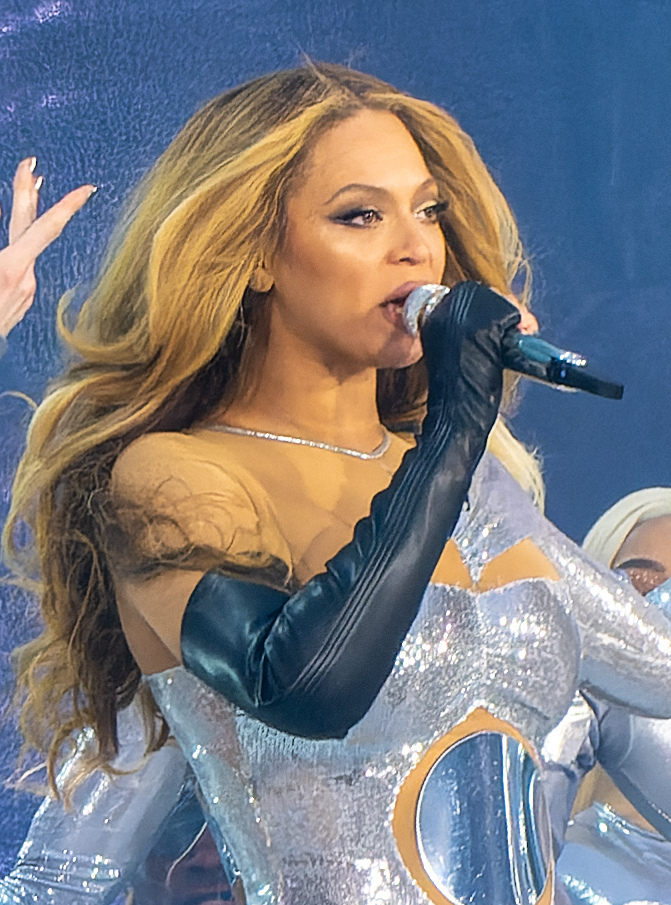
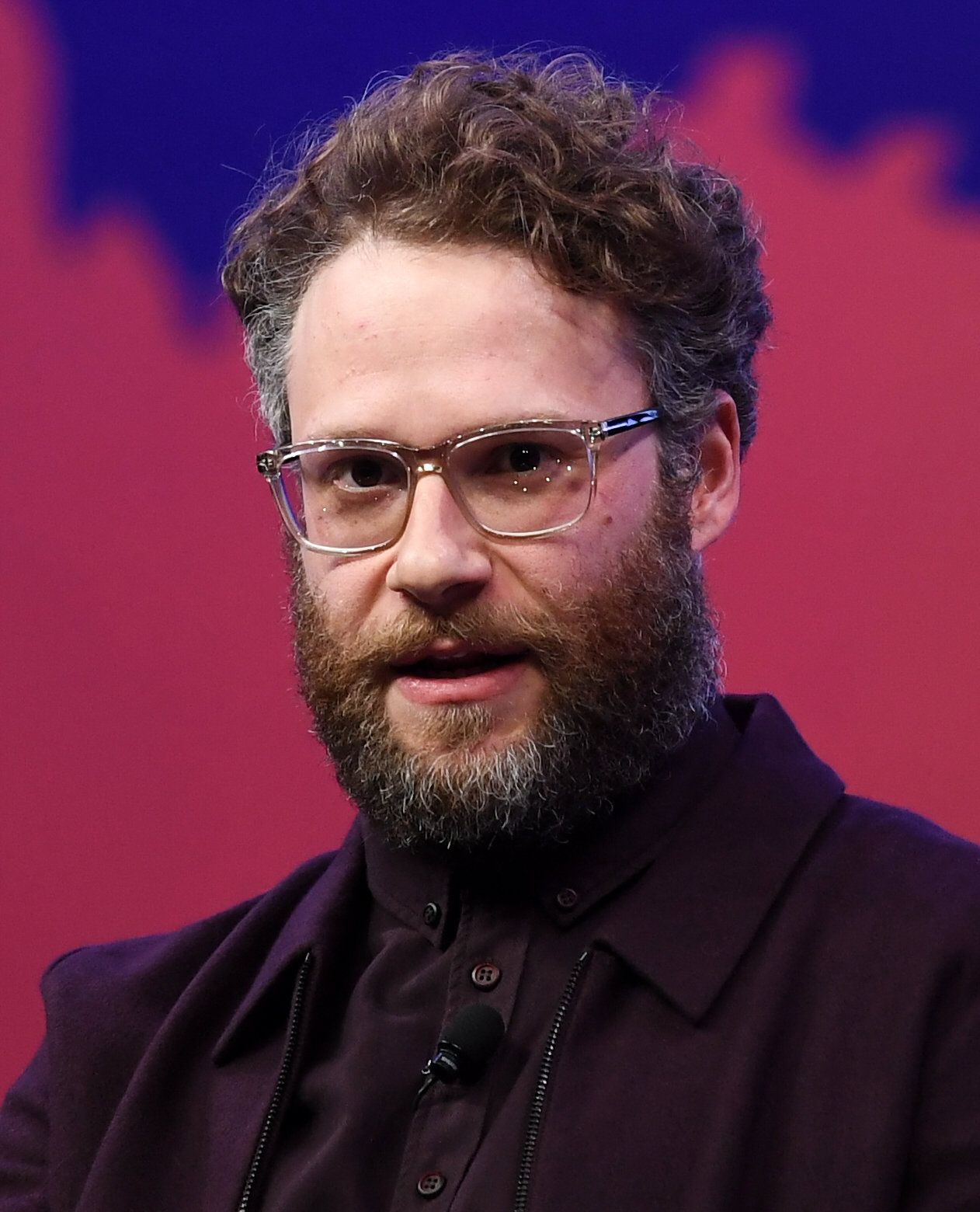
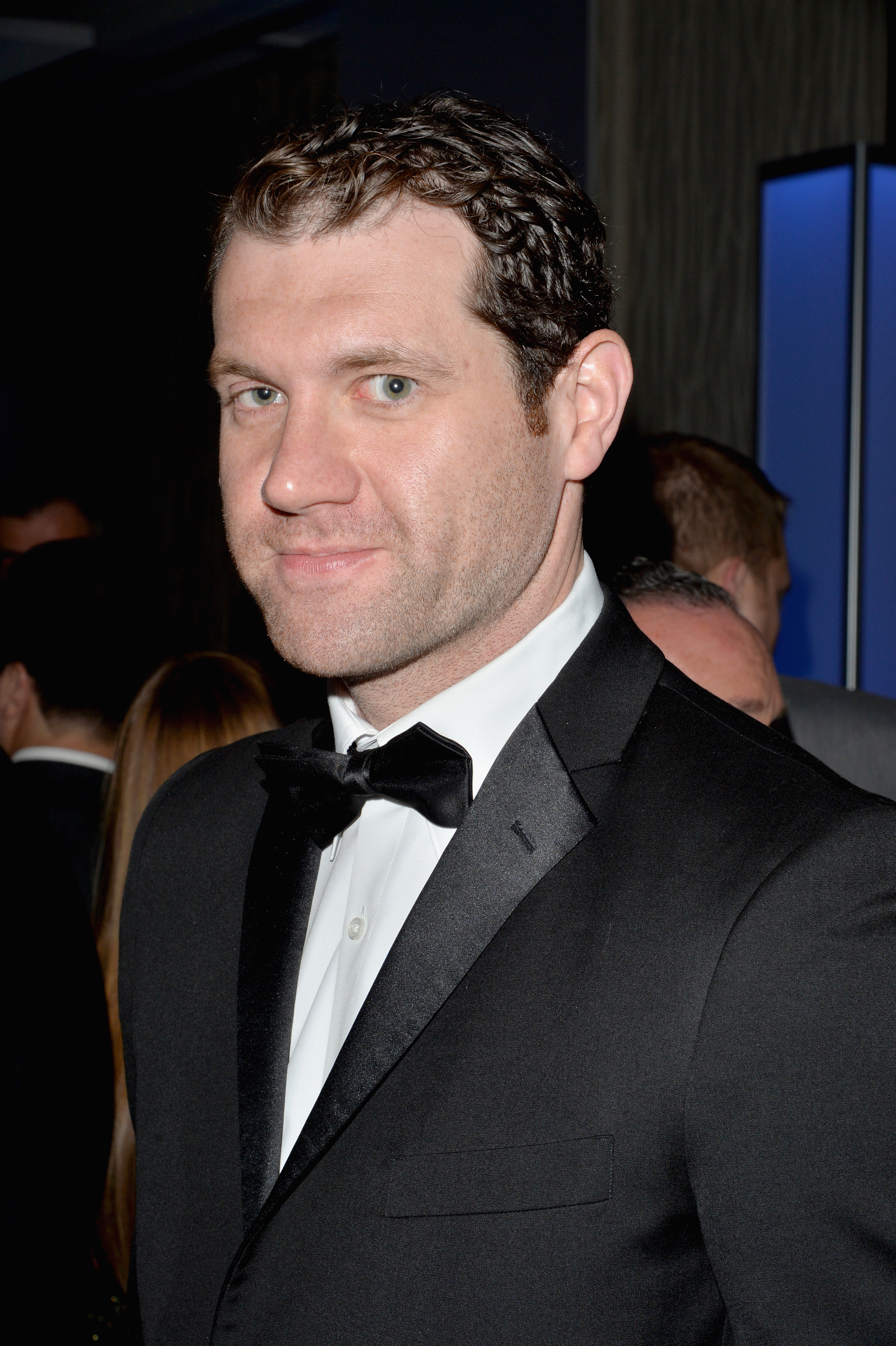
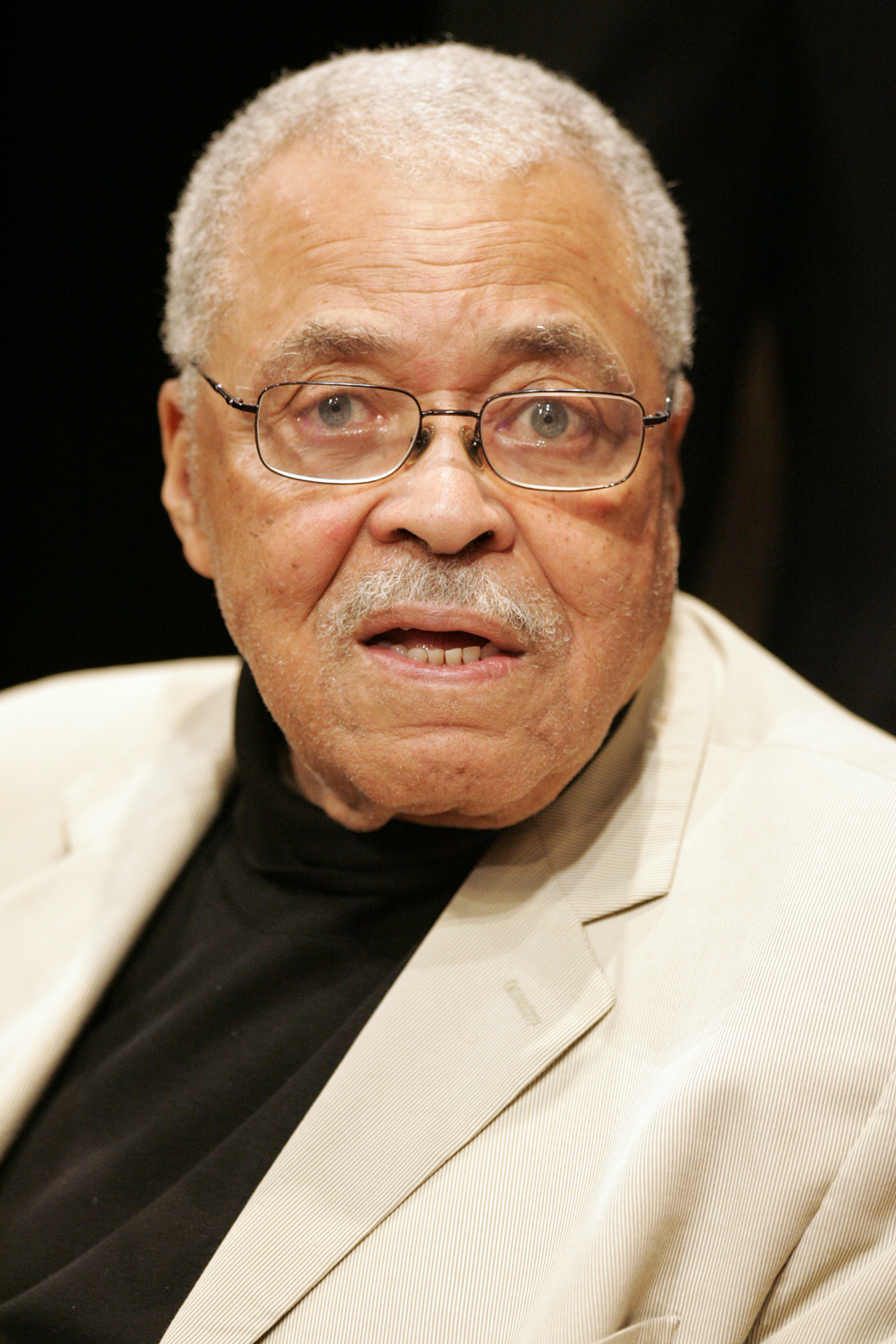
Top row: Donald Glover, Chiwetel Ejiofor, Beyoncé Knowles-Carter voice the characters of Simba, Scar, and Nala
Bottom row: Seth Rogen, Billy Eichner, and James Earl Jones voice the characters of Pumbaa, Timon, and Mufasa
- Donald Glover as Simba, a young lion prince and the son of Mufasa and Sarabi who grows up to become the future king of the Pride Lands. Glover said that the film will focus more on Simba's time growing up than the original film did, stating that "[Favreau] was very keen in making sure we saw [Simba's] transition from boy to man and how hard that can be when there's been a deep trauma".
  - JD McCrary as Simba as a cub.
- Seth Rogen as Pumbaa, a good-humored warthog who befriends and adopts Simba after he runs away from home. He also becomes one of Simba's best friends. Rogen said, "[a]s an actor, I [...] don't think I'm right for every role—there are a lot of roles I don't think I'm right for even in movies I'm making—but Pumbaa was one I knew I could do well". Favreau encouraged Rogen and Timon's Billy Eichner, who did their voice recordings together, to improvise a lot. Rogen's casting would also mark the first time that Pumbaa was not played by Ernie Sabella, who had reprised the role for every Disney project the character was involved in up to that point.
- Chiwetel Ejiofor as Scar, Mufasa's younger brother and rival who seizes the throne. Ejiofor described Scar as more "psychologically possessed" and "brutalized" than in the original film. Ejiofor said that "especially with Scar, whether it's a vocal quality that allows for a certain confidence or a certain aggression, to always know that at the end of it you're playing somebody who has the capacity to turn everything on its head in a split second with outrageous acts of violence—that can completely change the temperature of a scene". Ejiofor also said that "[Scar and Mufasa's] relationship is completely destroyed and brutalized by Scar's way of thinking. He's possessed with this disease of his own ego and his own want". Favreau said of casting Ejiofor, "[He] is just a fantastic actor, who brings us a bit of the mid-Atlantic cadence and a new take on the character. He brings that feeling of a Shakespearean villain to bear because of his background as an actor. It's wonderful when you have somebody as experienced and seasoned as Chiwetel; he just breathes such wonderful life into this character."
- Alfre Woodard as Sarabi, Mufasa's mate, Simba's mother, and the leader of the lioness hunting party.
- Billy Eichner as Timon, a wise-cracking meerkat who befriends and adopts a young Simba after he runs away from home. Eichner described Timon as "physically the smallest character, but he has one of the bigger personalities, and I love the combination of those two things. I kind of played into Timon, as I've done with many characters of mine, [the notion that] he might be small in stature but he has a huge sense of entitlement, which is always funny to play," and that "when Timon speaks and when he's quote-unquote 'being funny', he's very loud and boisterous, but [his] singing allows this vulnerable side, a slightly softer side, especially in 'Can You Feel the Love Tonight' and other moments." Eichner also talked about having "what some may consider a gay sensibility" that he brought to the table when he voiced Timon.
- John Kani as Rafiki, a wise mandrill who serves as the shaman of the Pride Lands and a close friend of Mufasa's. Likening his role to that of a grandfather, Kani said, "Rafiki reminds all of us of that special wise relative. His wisdom, humor and his loyalty to the Mufasa dynasty is what warms our hearts towards him. [He's] always happy and wisecracking jokes as lessons of life and survival."
- John Oliver as Zazu, a hornbill who serves as the majordomo to the King of the Pride Lands. Speaking of his role, Oliver said, "I think Zazu is basically a bird who likes structure. He just wants things to be as they should be. I think there are British echoes there because we tend to favor structure in lieu of having an emotional reaction to anything."
- Beyoncé Knowles-Carter as Nala, Simba's best friend and later his mate and Queen of the Pride Lands. According to Favreau, the character has a bigger role than in the original film. Favreau felt that "part of [Beyoncé joining the film] is that she's got young kids, part of it is that it's a story that feels good for this phase of her life and her career, and she really likes the original very much. And then, of course, there are these wonderful musical numbers that she can be involved with, and my God... she really lives up to her reputation as far as the beauty of her voice and talent".
  - Shahadi Wright Joseph as Nala as a cub. Joseph reprises her role from the Broadway production. Joseph chose to work on the film because "Nala inspires little girls [...] She's a great role model".
- James Earl Jones as Mufasa, Simba's father, King of the Pride Lands as the film begins. Jones reprises his role from the original 1994 animated film. According to Favreau, Jones' lines remain mostly the same from the original film. Ejiofor said that "the comfort of [Jones reprising his role] is going to be very rewarding in taking [the audience] on this journey again. It's a once-in-a-generation vocal quality". Favreau saw Jones' return as "carrying the legacy across" the original film and the remake, and felt that his voice's change in tonality compared to the original film "served the role well because he sounds like a king who's ruled for a long time".
- Florence Kasumba, Keegan-Michael Key, and Eric André voice Shenzi, Kamari, and Azizi, the Matriarch of the spotted hyena clan and her two lieutenants who join forces with Scar in order to kill Mufasa. While Shenzi is a character that was featured in the original 1994 animated film, Kamari and Azizi are the respective names of new characters loosely based on Banzai and Ed from the original film. The hyenas' characterizations were heavily altered from the original film's, as Favreau felt that they "had to change a lot" to fit the remake's realistic style, stating that "[a] lot of the stuff around them [in the original film] was very stylised". Kasumba elaborated, declaring that "[t]hose hyenas were funny. These hyenas are dangerous." Kasumba also voices Shenzi in the German dub of the film.

Additionally, Penny Johnson Jerald voices Sarafina, Nala's mother. Amy Sedaris, Chance the Rapper, Josh McCrary, and Phil LaMarr voice a guineafowl, a bushbaby, an elephant shrew, and an impala, respectively, Timon and Pumbaa's neighbors in the oasis. J. Lee voices a hyena that chases after Timon and Pumbaa.

== Production ==
=== Development ===
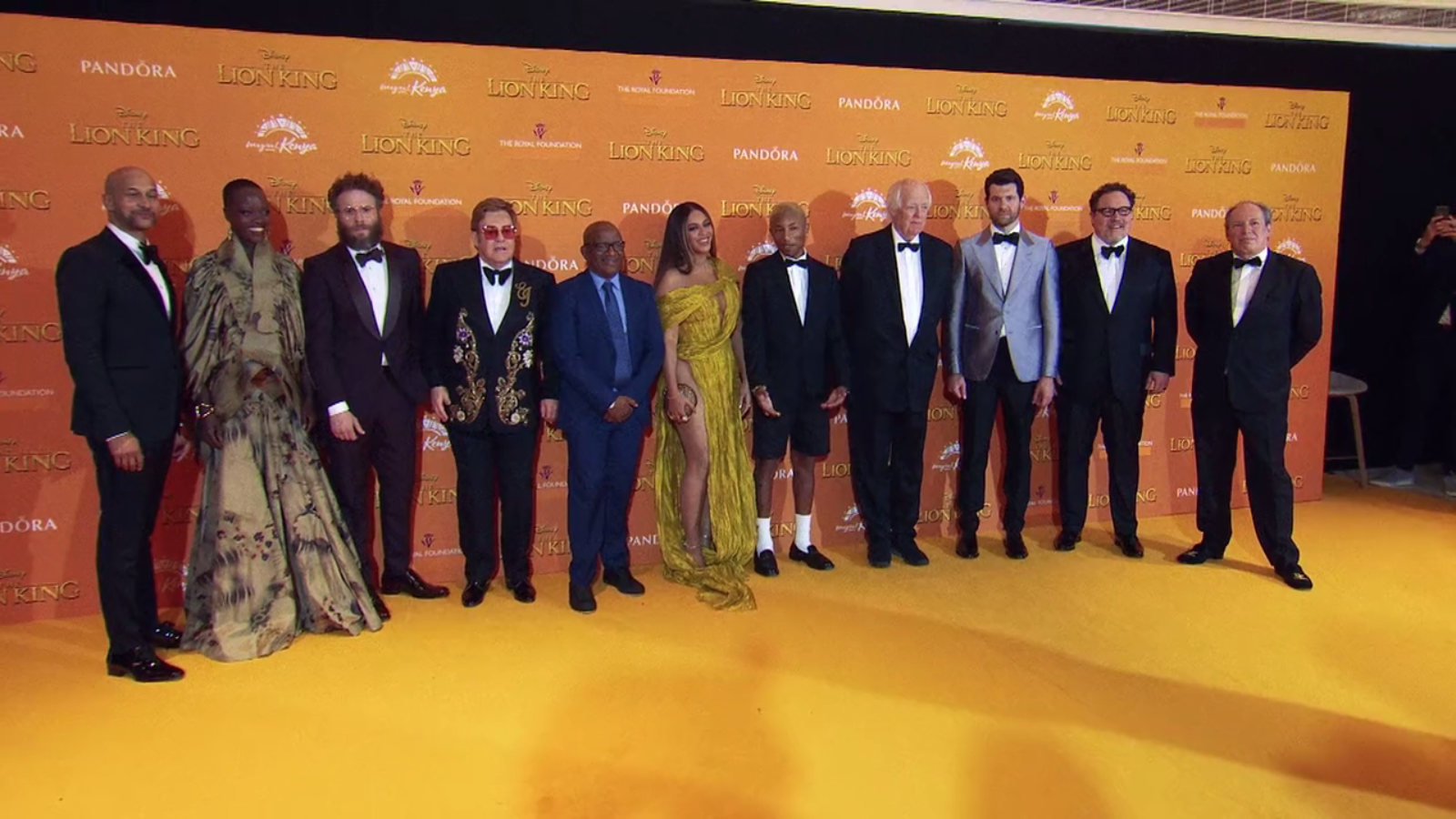
The Lion King cast at European Premiere in 2019

On September 28, 2016, Walt Disney Pictures confirmed that Jon Favreau would be directing a remake of the 1994 animated film The Lion King, which would feature the songs from the 1994 film, following a string of recent box office successes of Disney live-action remake films such as Maleficent, Cinderella and Favreau's The Jungle Book, with the latter two also earning critical praise. On October 13, 2016, it was reported that Disney had hired Jeff Nathanson to write the screenplay for the remake.

In November, talking with ComingSoon.net, Favreau said the virtual cinematography technology he used in The Jungle Book would be used to a greater degree in The Lion King. Although some reports reported The Lion King would be a live-action film, it actually utilizes photorealistic computer-generated animation. Disney also did not initially describe it as live-action, only stating it would follow the "technologically groundbreaking" approach of The Jungle Book. While the film acts as a remake of the 1994 animated film, Favreau was inspired by the Broadway adaptation of the film for certain aspects of the remake's plot, particularly Nala and Sarabi's roles. Favreau also aimed to develop his own take on the original film's story with what he said was the spectacle of a BBC wildlife documentary.

This serves as the final credit for film editor Mark Livolsi, who died in September 2018. The film is dedicated to him.

=== Casting ===
In mid-February 2017, Donald Glover was cast as Simba, with James Earl Jones reprising his role as Mufasa from the 1994 film. In April 2017, Billy Eichner and Seth Rogen were cast to play Timon and Pumbaa, respectively. In July 2017, John Oliver was cast as Zazu. In August 2017, Alfre Woodard and John Kani were announced to play Sarabi and Rafiki, respectively.

Earlier in March 2017, it was announced that Beyoncé Knowles-Carter was Favreau's top choice for the role of Nala and that the director and studio would be willing to do whatever it took to accommodate her busy schedule. Later on November 1, 2017, her role was confirmed in an official announcement, which also confirmed that Chiwetel Ejiofor would play the role of Scar, and announced that Eric André, Florence Kasumba, and Keegan-Michael Key would be the voices of Azizi, Shenzi, and Kamari while JD McCrary and Shahadi Wright Joseph would be the voices of young Simba and young Nala, respectively. In November 2018, Amy Sedaris was announced as having been cast in a role created for the film. Director Jon Favreau stated that the film's predominantly black cast was a timely update that brought greater authenticity to the film's African inspirations.

=== Visual effects ===
The Moving Picture Company, the lead vendor on The Jungle Book, provided the visual effects, which were supervised by Robert Legato, Elliot Newman, and Adam Valdez. The film uses "virtual-reality tools", according to Legato. Virtual Production Supervisor Girish Balakrishnan said on his professional website that the filmmakers used motion capture and VR/AR technologies. According to Favreau, MPC worked together with tech firms Magnopus and Unity Technologies to build the film's technology platform using the Unity game engine.

MPC was in charge of all the VFX shots for the film. There are 1,490 VFX shots. The animals were designed from art and photo references. From that, the characters were built; all the rigging, shapes, textures, and furs were rendered step-by-step for further improvement. After that, the animation of the animals was crafted by hand, based on the reference clips. The movements, muscles, eyes, facial expressions, and the way the animals breathe was animated for more than 30 species. The environment was created entirely in CGI from reference materials such as high-definition photos of the African landscape. All the FX simulations—such as water, dirt and fire—were created by combining VR technology with cameras shots so that scenes could be digitally built within a VR-simulated environment. New software developed for the movie made it possible to create scenes with the shaky-cam look of a handheld camera. Sean Bailey, Disney's President of Production, said of the film's visual effects, "It's a new form of filmmaking. Historical definitions don't work. It uses some techniques that would traditionally be called animation, and other techniques that would traditionally be called live action. It is an evolution of the technology Jon [Favreau] used in Jungle Book".

Rather than have animators do everything, the team used artificial intelligence to allow virtual characters to behave in ways that mimicked real animals. The sole non-animated shot in the entire film is the sunrise in the opening scene.

== Music ==
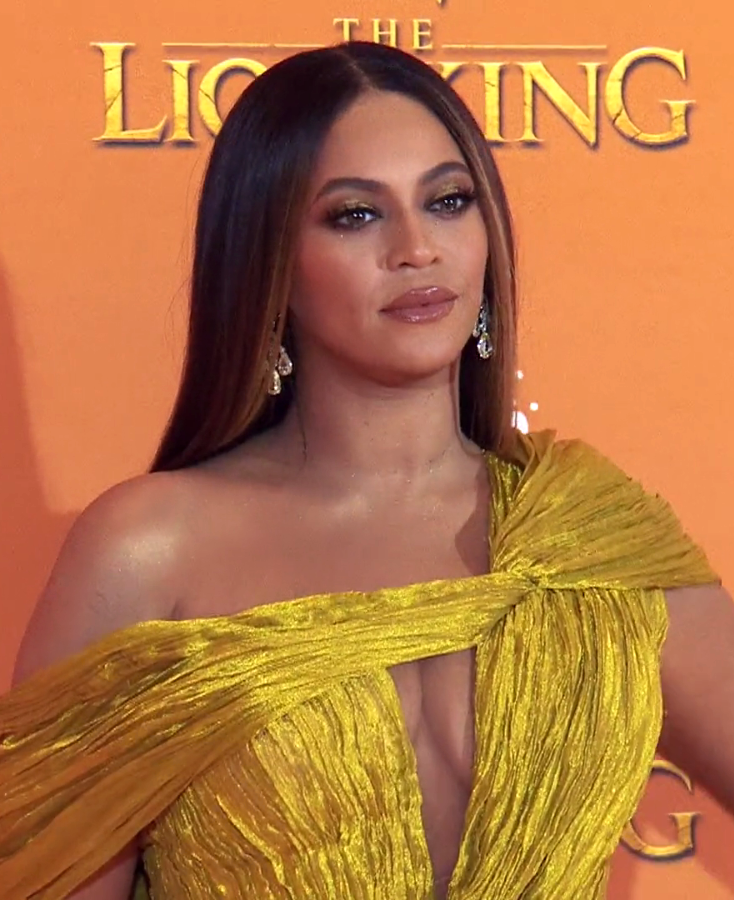
Beyoncé produced The Lion King: The Gift, an album inspired by the film

Hans Zimmer, who composed the 1994 animated version, returned to compose the score for the remake with Pharrell Williams as a collaborator. Elton John also returned to rework his musical compositions from the original film, with Knowles-Carter assisting John in the reworking of the soundtrack. John, the original film's lyricist, Tim Rice, and Knowles-Carter were also slated in 2018 to create a new song for the film. However, the collaboration between Knowles-Carter and John did not pan out as the unreleased song was not added to the official soundtrack. John and Rice also wrote a new song for the film's end credits, titled "Never Too Late" and performed by John.

"Spirit", performed by Knowles-Carter and written by herself, Ilya Salmanzadeh, and Labrinth, was released on July 9, 2019, as the lead single from the soundtrack. The film also features all the songs from the original film, a cover of The Tokens' "The Lion Sleeps Tonight", and the song "He Lives in You" from Rhythm of the Pride Lands and the Broadway production. The soundtrack, featuring Zimmer's score and John and Rice's songs, was released digitally on July 11, 2019, and physically on July 19, 2019.

Knowles-Carter also produced and curated an album titled The Lion King: The Gift, which features "Spirit", as well as songs inspired by the film. The album was released on July 19, 2019.

== Marketing ==
The first teaser trailer and the official teaser poster for The Lion King debuted during the Dallas Cowboys' annual Thanksgiving Day game on November 22, 2018. The trailer was viewed 224.6 million times in its first 24 hours, becoming the then 2nd-most-viewed trailer in that time period. A special sneak peek featuring John Kani's voice as Rafiki and a new poster were released during the 91st Academy Awards on February 24, 2019. On April 10, 2019, Disney released the official trailer featuring new footage which revealed Scar, Zazu, Simba and Nala (both as cubs and as adults), Sarabi, Rafiki, Timon and Pumbaa, and the hyenas. The trailer was viewed 174 million times in its first 24 hours, which was revealed on Disney's Investor Day 2019 Webcast. On May 30, 2019, 11 individual character posters were released. A special sneak peek featuring Beyoncé Knowles-Carter's, Billy Eichner's, and Seth Rogen's voices as Nala, Timon, and Pumbaa, respectively, was released on June 3, 2019. A special sneak peek featuring Knowles-Carter and Donald Glover's voices as Simba and Nala singing "Can You Feel the Love Tonight" and also featuring James Earl Jones' voice as Mufasa, was released on June 20, 2019. On July 2, 2019, Disney released an extensive behind-the-scenes featurette detailing the various aspects of the film's production along with seven publicity stills featuring the voice actors facing their animal counterparts. All-in-all, Disney spent around $145 million promoting the film.

=== Novelization ===
A tie-in novelization of the film written by Elizabeth Rudnick was published by Disney Publishing Worldwide on June 4, 2019.

=== Shot-for-shot claim ===
The trailers of the film led to a claim of its being a shot-for-shot remake of Disney's 1994 film. On December 23, 2018, Sean Bailey, Disney's President of Production, said that while the film will "revere and love those parts that the audience wants", there will be "things in the movie that are going to be new". On April 18, 2019, Favreau stated that "some shots in the 1994 animated film are so iconic" he couldn't possibly change them, but "despite what the trailers suggest, this film is not just the same movie over again", and later said "it's much longer than the original film. And part of what we're doing here is to (give it more dimension) not just visually but both story-wise and emotionally."

On May 30, 2019, Favreau said that some of the humor and characterizations are being altered to be more consistent with the rest of the film, and this remake is making some changes in certain scenes from the original film, as well as in its structure. On June 14, 2019, Favreau said that, while the original film's main plot points would remain unchanged in the remake, the film would largely diverge from the original version, and hinted that the Elephant Graveyard, the hyenas' lair in the original film, will be replaced by a new location. The film is approximately 30 minutes longer than the original. Despite Favreau's claims, upon release, the film was criticized by fans and critics alike for being nearly identical to the original, with many citing its overall lack of originality as a major flaw.

== Release ==
=== Theatrical ===
The Lion King premiered in Hollywood on July 9, 2019. The film had a European premiere in London on July 14 in Leicester Square, which included the first red carpet appearance of Prince Harry together with Meghan, Duchess of Sussex. who attended in support of their charitable conservation work in Africa. Prince Harry was reported as saying he "knew all the words" to the original film, and his attendance made headlines months later when it was suggested he had spoken to Disney CEO Bob Iger about voice-over opportunities for his wife. The film was theatrically released in the United States on July 19, 2019, in IMAX and 3D. It is one of the first theatrical films to be released on Disney+, alongside Aladdin, Toy Story 4, Frozen II, Captain Marvel, and Star Wars: The Rise of Skywalker. The film began its international rollout a week before its domestic release, starting with July 12 in China.

=== Home media ===
The Lion King was released by Walt Disney Studios Home Entertainment on Digital HD on October 11, 2019, followed by a DVD, Blu-ray, and Ultra HD Blu-ray release on October 22. It started streaming on Disney+ on January 28, 2020.

== Reception ==
=== Box office ===
The Lion King grossed $543.6 million in the United States and Canada, and $1.113 billion in other territories, for a worldwide total of $1.657 billion. $63 million came from IMAX.

The film had a global debut of $446 million, the ninth-largest of all time and the biggest opening for an animated film. On July 30, 2019, The Lion King passed the $1 billion mark at the global box office. The Lion King became the highest-grossing animated film of all time, a title it held until September 2024 when it was surpassed by Inside Out 2 (Note: According to Disney, the film was not an animated film but a live-action reboot.). It is also the highest-grossing musical film of all time, the highest-grossing remake of all time, the second-highest-grossing film of 2019, and the seventh-highest-grossing film of at the time of its release. Deadline Hollywood calculated the net profit of the film to be $580 million, when factoring together all expenses and revenues.

==== United States and Canada ====
Beginning on June 24, 2019 (which marked the 25th anniversary of the release of the original film), in its first 24 hours of pre-sales, The Lion King became the second-best pre-seller of 2019 on Fandango in that frame (behind Avengers: Endgame), while Atom Tickets reported it was their best-ever first-day sales for a family film. Three weeks prior to its release, industry tracking projected the film would gross $150–170 million in its domestic opening weekend. By the week of its release, estimates had the film debuting to as much as $180 million from 4,725 theaters, beating Avengers: Endgame's record of 4,662. The film made $77.9 million on its first day, including $23 million from Thursday night previews. It went on to debut to $191.8 million over the weekend, the highest opening total of the Disney reimaginings of animated films (beating Beauty and the Beast's $174.8 million), a July release (Harry Potter and the Deathly Hallows – Part 2's $169.2 million) (Note: This was surpassed by Deadpool & Wolverine in 2024.) and Favreau's career (Iron Man 2's $128.1 million). The film had a slightly higher-than-expected drop of 60% in its second weekend, but still topped the box office with $76.6 million. It was dethroned by newcomer Hobbs & Shaw in its third weekend but still grossed $38.5 million, crossing the $400 million mark in the process. On August 21, it became the second animated film to have grossed $500 million at North America box office, after Incredibles 2. At the end of the film's box office run, it was the second highest-grossing film of 2019 in this region behind Avengers: Endgame.

==== Other territories ====
The film was expected to gross around $450 million over its first 10 days of a global release, including $160–170 million from its worldwide opening weekend. In China, where it released a week prior to the rest of the world, the film was projected to debut to $50–60 million. It ended up opening to $54.2 million, besting the debuts of live-action remakes The Jungle Book and Beauty and the Beast. Over its first 8 days of global release, the film made a total of $751 million, including $351.8 million from overseas territories. This included $269.4 million from its opening weekend (sans China), with its largest countries being the United Kingdom, Ireland and Malta ($20.8 million), France ($19.6 million), Mexico ($18.7 million), Brazil ($17.9 million), South Korea ($17.7 million), Australia ($17.1 million), and Russia ($16.7 million, second-largest ever in the country), as well as $6 million in the Netherlands, the best opening of a film ever in the country. As of September 16, 2019, the film's top 10 largest markets were China ($120.4 million), the United Kingdom, Ireland and Malta ($91.3 million), France ($79 million), Brazil ($69.1 million, second-highest all time in the country), Japan ($60 million), Germany ($53.8 million), Mexico ($51.8 million), Russia ($47.3 million), Australia ($42.8 million), and Italy ($40 million). The film became the first animated and musical film to gross $1 billion at overseas box office.

As of September 2019, the film became the highest-grossing film of all time in the Netherlands ($30.2 million), surpassing previous record held by Titanic ($28.5 million including re-release) and South Africa (R107.6 million, $7.29 million), surpassing Black Panther in local currency terms (in dollar terms, is still second-highest of all time). Meanwhile, the film become the highest-grossing films of 2019 in many other countries and regions: Austria, Belgium and Luxembourg, Bulgaria, France, Algeria, Monaco, Morocco and Tunisia, Italy, Lithuania, Norway, Portugal and Angola, Russia, Serbia and Montenegro, Slovenia, Sweden, Switzerland, and Spain. It is also the highest-grossing foreign film of 2019 in Poland In India, the film grossed $26.3 million, making it the fourth-highest-grossing Hollywood or foreign films of all time, highest-grossing animated film of all time (both local and foreign films), and one of top 50 highest-grossing films of all time in India. In Europe, Middle East, and Africa, the film surpassed Avengers: Endgame to become the fourth-highest-grossing film of all time and highest-grossing film of 2019 across the region.

=== Critical response ===
The review aggregator website Rotten Tomatoes reported a critics' approval rating of 52% with an average rating of 6/10, based on 437 reviews. The website's critical consensus reads: "While it can take pride in its visual achievements, The Lion King is a by-the-numbers retelling that lacks the energy and heart that made the original so beloved — though for some fans that may just be enough." It is the highest-grossing film with a "rotten" rating on Rotten Tomatoes. Metacritic gave the film a weighted average score of 55 out of 100, based on 54 critics, indicating "mixed or average reviews". Audiences polled by CinemaScore gave the film an average grade of "A" on an A+ to F scale, and those at PostTrak gave the film a four out of five stars.

Some critics praised the fidelity to the original, while others criticized it for its lack of originality. Kenneth Turan at the Los Angeles Times called the film "polished, satisfying entertainment." Todd McCarthy at The Hollywood Reporter considered it to be inferior to the original, noting, "The film's aesthetic caution and predictability begin to wear down on the entire enterprise in the second half." At The Guardian, Peter Bradshaw found the film "watchable and enjoyable. But I missed the simplicity and vividness of the original hand-drawn images." Among the vocal performances, the roles of Eichner and Rogen as Timon and Pumbaa, respectively, received particular praise by critics, with The A.V. Club's A. A. Dowd proclaiming: "Ultimately, only Billy Eichner and Seth Rogen, as slacker sidekicks Timon and Pumbaa, make much of an impression; their funny, possibly ad-libbed banter feels both fresh and true to the spirit of the characters — the perfect remake recipe."

William Bibbiani of TheWrap wrote in his review, "Jon Favreau's remake looks incredibly literal, but the digital animal performers lack the facial expressions and body movement to tell the story." Sreeparna Sengupta of The Times of India praised the film, giving it a score of 3.5/5 and stating "For those who haven't seen the original, 'The Lion King' (2019) is certainly worth a watch for its gorgeous visuals and technical genius." Helen O'Hara of Empire gave the film 3/5 stars, saying, "The great circle of life has thrown up a gorgeous, star-studded story, but trading feeling for realism means that we lose something of the original film's excellence." Matt Zoller Seitz of RogerEbert.com gave the film 3/4 stars, saying, "The worst thing you can say about this movie, and perhaps the highest compliment you can pay it, is to say it would be even more dazzling if it told a different story with different animals and the same technology and style — and maybe without songs, because you don't necessarily need them when you have images that sing." Kevin Maher of The Times gave the film 4/5 stars, praising it as an improvement over the original, though he criticized the ending as "descend[ing] into a sprawling Avengers-style donnybrook with little dramatic resonance." Edward Porter of The Sunday Times gave the film 3/5 stars, praising the visuals and performances, but criticizing the lack of expressiveness of the characters' faces.

A. A. Dowd, writing for The A.V. Club, summarized the film as such: "Joyless, artless, and maybe soulless, it transforms one of the most striking titles from the Mouse House vault into a very expensive, star-studded Disneynature film." Dowd bemoaned the film's insistence on realism, commenting, "We're watching a hollow bastardization of a blockbuster, at once completely reliant on the audience's pre-established affection for its predecessor and strangely determined to jettison much of what made it special." Scott Mendelson at Forbes condemned the film as a "crushing disappointment": "At almost every turn, this redo undercuts its own melodrama by downplaying its own emotions." David Ehrlich of IndieWire panned the film, writing, "Unfolding like the world's longest and least convincing deepfake, Jon Favreau's (almost) photorealistic remake of The Lion King is meant to represent the next step in Disney's circle of life. Instead, this soulless chimera of a film comes off as little more than a glorified tech demo from a greedy conglomerate — a well-rendered but creatively bankrupt self-portrait of a movie studio eating its own tail."

Elton John, who worked on the film's soundtrack, disowned the film and stated "The new version of The Lion King was a huge disappointment to me, because I believe they messed the music up. Music was so much a part of the original and the music in the current film didn't have the same impact. The magic and joy were lost."

=== Accolades ===
Award	Date of ceremony	Category	Recipient(s)	Result	Ref(s)
People's Choice Awards	November 10, 2019	Movie of 2019	The Lion King	Nominated	
People's Choice Awards	November 10, 2019	Family Movie of 2019	The Lion King	Nominated	
People's Choice Awards	November 10, 2019	Animated Movie Star of 2019	Beyoncé	Won	
Hollywood Music in Media Awards	November 20, 2019	Best Original Song – Feature Film	Ilya Salmanzadeh, Labrinth and Beyoncé (for "Spirit")	Nominated	
Hollywood Post Alliance	November 21, 2019	Outstanding Visual Effects – Feature Film	The Lion King	Won	
Guinness World Record	2020	Highest-grossing remake at the global box office	The Lion King	Won	
Satellite Awards	December 19, 2019	Best Animated or Mixed Media Feature	Jon Favreau	Won	
Satellite Awards	December 19, 2019	Best Original Song	Ilya Salmanzadeh, Labrinth and Beyoncé (for "Spirit")	Nominated	
Satellite Awards	December 19, 2019	Best Visual Effects	Andrew R. Jones, Robert Legato, Elliot Newman and Adam Valdez	Nominated	
Capri Hollywood International Film Festival	January 2, 2020	Best Original Song	Ilya Salmanzadeh, Labrinth and Beyoncé (for "Spirit")	Won	
Capri Hollywood International Film Festival	January 2, 2020	Best Sound Editing	The Lion King	Won	
Capri Hollywood International Film Festival	January 2, 2020	Best Sound Mixing	The Lion King	Won	
Golden Globe Awards	January 5, 2020	Best Animated Feature Film	The Lion King	Nominated	
Golden Globe Awards	January 5, 2020	Best Original Song – Motion Picture	Ilya Salmanzadeh, Labrinth and Beyoncé (for "Spirit")	Nominated	
Alliance of Women Film Journalists Awards	January 10, 2020	Time Waster Remake or Sequel Award	The Lion King	Nominated	
Critics' Choice Movie Awards	January 12, 2020	Best Visual Effects	The Lion King	Nominated	
Critics' Choice Movie Awards	January 12, 2020	Best Song	Ilya Salmanzadeh, Labrinth and Beyoncé (for "Spirit")	Nominated	
Golden Eagle Award	January 24, 2020	Best Foreign Language Film	The Lion King	Won	
Grammy Awards	January 26, 2020	Best Pop Solo Performance	Beyoncé (for "Spirit")	Nominated	
Grammy Awards	January 26, 2020	Best Compilation Soundtrack for Visual Media	The Lion King	Nominated	
Grammy Awards	January 26, 2020	Best Score Soundtrack for Visual Media	Hans Zimmer	Nominated	
Grammy Awards	January 26, 2020	Best Song Written for Visual Media	Ilya Salmanzadeh, Labrinth and Beyoncé (for "Spirit")	Nominated	
Visual Effects Society Awards	January 29, 2020	Outstanding Visual Effects in a Photoreal Feature	Robert Legato, Tom Peitzman, Adam Valdez, Andrew R. Jones	Won	
Visual Effects Society Awards	January 29, 2020	Outstanding Animated Character in a Photoreal Feature	Gabriel Arnold, James Hood, Julia Friedl, Daniel Fortheringham (for "Scar")	Nominated	
Visual Effects Society Awards	January 29, 2020	Outstanding Created Environment in a Photoreal Feature	Marco Rolandi, Luca Bonatti, Jules Bodenstein, Filippo Preti (for "The Prideland")	Won	
Visual Effects Society Awards	January 29, 2020	Outstanding Virtual Cinematography in a CG Project	Robert Legato, Caleb Deschanel, Ben Grossman, AJ Sciutto	Won	
Visual Effects Society Awards	January 29, 2020	Outstanding Effects Simulations in a Photoreal Feature	David Schneider, Samantha Hiscock, Andy Feery, Kostas Strevlos	Nominated	
Casting Society of America	January 30, 2020	Animation	Sarah Halley Finn and Jason B. Stamey (Associate) (tied with Toy Story 4)	Won	
Art Directors Guild Awards	February 1, 2020	Animated Film	James Chinlund	Nominated	
British Academy Film Awards	February 2, 2020	Best Special Visual Effects	Andrew R. Jones, Robert Legato, Elliot Newman and Adam Valdez	Nominated	
Black Reel Awards	February 7, 2020	Outstanding Original Song	Ilya Salmanzadeh, Labrinth and Beyoncé (for "Spirit")	Nominated	
Black Reel Awards	February 7, 2020	Outstanding Voice Performance	Chiwetel Ejiofor	Won	
Black Reel Awards	February 7, 2020	Outstanding Voice Performance	Donald Glover	Nominated	
Black Reel Awards	February 7, 2020	Outstanding Voice Performance	James Earl Jones	Nominated	
Black Reel Awards	February 7, 2020	Outstanding Production Design	James Chinlund	Nominated	
Guild of Music Supervisors Awards	February 7, 2020	Best Song Written and/or Recorded for a Film	Ilya Salmanzadeh, Labrinth and Beyoncé (for "Spirit")	Nominated	
Academy Awards	February 9, 2020	Best Visual Effects	Robert Legato, Adam Valdez, Andrew R. Jones and Elliot Newman	Nominated	
NAACP Image Awards	February 22, 2020	Outstanding Character Voice-Over Performance	Donald Glover	Nominated	
NAACP Image Awards	February 22, 2020	Outstanding Character Voice-Over Performance	James Earl Jones	Won	
NAACP Image Awards	February 22, 2020	Outstanding Character Voice-Over Performance	Alfre Woodard	Nominated	
NAACP Image Awards	February 22, 2020	Outstanding Song - Traditional	Ilya Salmanzadeh, Labrinth and Beyoncé (for "Spirit")	Won	
Nickelodeon Kids' Choice Awards	May 2, 2020	Favorite Animated Movie	The Lion King	Nominated	
Nickelodeon Kids' Choice Awards	May 2, 2020	Favorite Female Voice from an Animated Movie	Beyoncé	Won	
Saturn Awards	October 26, 2021	Best Fantasy Film Release		Nominated	

== Follow-up ==
On September 29, 2020, Deadline Hollywood reported that a follow-up film was in development with Barry Jenkins attached to direct. While The Hollywood Reporter said the film would be a prequel about Mufasa during his formative years, Deadline said it would be a sequel centering on both Mufasa's origins and the events after the first film, similar to The Godfather Part II. Jeff Nathanson, the screenwriter for the remake, has reportedly finished a draft. In August 2021, it was reported that Aaron Pierre and Kelvin Harrison Jr. had been cast as Mufasa and Scar respectively. The film is not a remake of The Lion King II: Simba's Pride, the 1998 direct-to-video sequel to the original animated film. In September 2022 at the D23 Expo, it was announced that the film would be titled Mufasa: The Lion King and that it would follow the titular character's origin story. Seth Rogen, Billy Eichner, and John Kani reprised their roles as Pumbaa, Timon, and Rafiki, respectively. The film was released on December 20, 2024.
