= He Lives in You =

Single by Lebo M

from the album Rhythm of the Pride Lands
- A-side: "Hakuna Matata"
- Released: February 28, 1995
- Length: 4:51
- Label: Walt Disney
- Songwriters: Lebo M; Mark Mancina; Jay Rifkin
- Producers: Mark Mancina; Jay Rifkin

"He Lives in You" is a song written and performed by Lebo M and his South African Choir and co-written by Mark Mancina and Jay Rifkin, originally for Rhythm of the Pride Lands, a 1995 album inspired by the 1994 film The Lion King. It is also performed twice (first in a shorter form, "They Live in You", and then in its full form) in the stage musical adaptation of The Lion King, first produced in 1997. Furthermore, an abridged version of the song was used for the opening of the 1998 sequel film The Lion King II: Simba's Pride.

== The Lion King musical ==
Simba and the ensemble performing "He Lives in You" from the second act of The Lion King musical

The song initially appears in Act I as "They Live in You", which is sung by Mufasa to his young son Simba. Mufasa explains that the Great Kings of the Past are watching over them from the stars above. If Simba ever feels alone, he can trust that the Great Kings are there, as Mufasa will also be one day.

Later, in Act II, Rafiki finds a lonely and forlorn Simba in the jungle and explains to the lion that his father Mufasa lives on through the song "He Lives in You". In the musical, this serves as a reprise of "They Live in You". Simba follows Rafiki to a pool of water, in which Simba sees only his own reflection at first and is skeptical. As the song becomes quieter, however, the face of Mufasa appears above the stage in the starry night sky. He tells Simba to "remember who you are" before fading away. Simba, invigorated and realizing what he now must do, leaps up from the pool as ensemble singers appear on the stage for the second part of the song. The ensemble, Rafiki, and Simba join in a joyous celebration before Simba returns to the Pride Lands to challenge Scar.

== The Lion King II: Simba's Pride ==
The song is used in the opening sequence of The Lion King II: Simba's Pride, sung by Lebo M. Animals are shown traveling to Pride Rock to witness the presentation of Simba and Nala's newborn daughter, Kiara. The main theme of the song is that Mufasa's legacy lives on, despite his death. Mufasa's spirit is also seen watching over the presentation of his granddaughter.

== The Lion King (2019 film) ==
Lebo M performs a Xhosa version of the song that plays over the credits of the 2019 remake film and is included on the film's soundtrack.

== Cover versions ==
Tina Turner's version was featured on the compilation album The Lion King Collection as well as the credits of the film during some non-English dubs.

Diana Ross recorded the song for her 1999 album, Every Day Is a New Day and for the 1999 movie Double Platinum where her character Olivia King sang it.

TRF recorded the song for the Japanese version of Simba's Pride, releasing their version as their 25th single in 1999.

Lonnie Gordon recorded a house version for her album No Regret and released it as a single in 2001. The same year, Michael Crawford sang this song as part of a medley on The Disney Album.

"They Live in You" was used by Johnny Mathis for his 2000 album, Mathis on Broadway.

The song was covered by Elijah Kelley for Disneymania 6.

In 2015, the song was including in a Lion King songs medley performed by YouTuber and singer Georgia Merry.

Michael Ball and Alfie Boe covered the song on their album Together Again in 2017.

Destiny Chukunyere covered it during Movie Week and her finale performance in the second season of X Factor Malta in 2020.
