= Rhythm of the Pride Lands =

Soundtrack album by Lebo M
- Released: February 28, 1995
- Recorded: January 1993–April 1994
- Studios: Media Ventures (Los Angeles); Ocean Way (Los Angeles); Snake Ranch (London); Angel (London); BOP studios (Mmabatho)
- Genres: Pop; soundtrack; world; African; reggae
- Length: 47:13
- Label: Walt Disney
- Producers: Mark Mancina; Jay Rifkin; Hans Zimmer; John Van Tongeren

Rhythm of the Pride Lands is an audio CD released on February 28, 1995, by Walt Disney Records, a "sequel" to the original motion picture soundtrack of the animated film The Lion King (1994). Most of the tracks were composed by Lebo M, Jay Rifkin, and Hans Zimmer and focused primarily on the African influences of the film's original music, with most songs being sung either partially or entirely in various African languages.

The CD was originally an independent project developed by Rifkin and Lebo M and included songs and performances inspired by, but not featured in the film. As the project developed, Walt Disney Records came on board and supported the project as then-newly appointed senior vice president Carolyn Mayer Beug sought to expand Disney Records' foray into adult contemporary music.

Several songs featured on the album would later have incarnations in other The Lion King-oriented projects, inspiring Julie Taymor's stage musical and the direct-to-video sequels, such as "He Lives in You". For example, the songs "Lea Halalela (Holy Land)" and "Lala" were adapted into, respectively, "Shadowland", and "Endless Night" for the stage musical adaptation. "Warthog Rhapsody", which delved deeper into Pumbaa's origins, was originally recorded to be included in the movie, but was replaced with "Hakuna Matata". The song was later reworked with new lyrics into the song "That's All I Need" for The Lion King 1½ (2004), which also included the Lebo M arrangement of "The Lion Sleeps Tonight" that originally appeared on the album.

Rhythm of the Pride Lands was initially printed in a very limited quantity. Today, it is available digitally through the iTunes Store.

== Reception ==
=== Commercial release ===
In its first two weeks of release, Rhythm of the Pride Lands had reached to number 23 on the Billboard 200. By April 1997, the album had sold more than 900,000 copies, and by October 1998, it was certified platinum.

=== Critical reaction ===
Professional ratings
Review scores
Source	Rating
AllMusic	3/5 stars

Jack Garner of the Democrat and Chronicle wrote that Rhythm of the Pride Lands was "an appropriate companion to the soundtrack album." Tom Jackson of the Tampa Tribune gave the album 2 1/2 stars out of 4 writing that "Although not the equal of the original soundtrack, this collection of Lion King-inspired music effectively captures the haunting theme of the celebrated Elton John-Tim Rice collaboration." Jackson particularly praised Lebo M for his vocals on tracks 1 and 4, feeling that they "could seamlessly fit in the movie." Furthermore, he praised the South African chorus for their "chill[ing]" vocals on tracks 6, 7, 9, and 10. Scott Bernade of the Palm Beach Post wrote that "Pride Lands may be slick and synth-driven, but it brims with traditional poly-rhythms and joyous chanting and is a good introduction to African music."

Keri Sweetman, in her review of the Ottawa Citizen, reflected that her children were initially disappointed with the album, but later stated "they've grown more enthusiastic, especially with the pounding duet version of their favorite Lion King song, 'Hakuna Matata', Lebo M's rendition of the classic 'The Lion Sleeps Tonight', and the funny Elton John song, 'Warthog Rhapsody'." She concluded that "The nice thing about Rhythm of the Pride Lands is that it will appeal as much to adults as it does for children who loved the movie. I find myself playing it when the kids aren't around." Larry Nager of the Citizens' Voice felt the album took "some of the most exciting music on the planet and turns it into one very long, boring ride." However, he complimented the tracks "One by One" and "Warthog Rhapsody" for respectively bringing "things to life" and the comedic chemistry between Nathan Lane and Ernie Sabella.

== Track listing ==
No.	Title	Writer(s)	Performer(s)	Length
1.	"He Lives in You"	Lebo M, Mark Mancina, and Jay Rifkin	Lebo M, Chorus	4:51
2.	"Hakuna Matata"	Elton John and Tim Rice	Jimmy Cliff and Lebo M	4:24
3.	"The Lion Sleeps Tonight"	George David Weiss, Luigi Creatore, Hugo Peretti, Albert Stanton and Solomon Linda	Lebo M	3:33
4.	"Kube"	Caiphus Semenya and Lebo M	Lebo M	3:46
5.	"Lea Halalela (Holy Land)"	Hans Zimmer and Lebo M	Khululiwe Sithole, Chorus	6:02
6.	"It's Time"	Jay Rifkin, John Van Tongeren, and Lebo M	Lebo M	4:26
7.	"One by One"	Lebo M	Lebo M, Chorus	3:10
8.	"Warthog Rhapsody"	Elton John and Tim Rice	Nathan Lane and Ernie Sabella	3:06
9.	"Lala"	Hans Zimmer, Jay Rifkin, Lebo M	Lebo M	4:34
10.	"Busa"	Hans Zimmer, Jay Rifkin, Lebo M	Lebo M, Chorus	4:04
11.	"Noyana"	Luyanda Jezile, Wendy Mseleku and Max Ngcobo	Lebo M, Chorus	5:13
Total length:				47:13

== Charts ==
Weekly chart performance for Rhythm of the Pride Lands
Chart (1995)	Peak position
Belgian Albums (Ultratop Wallonia)	39
US Billboard 200	23
