= Annie Award for Outstanding Achievement for Music in a Feature Production =

Film award for best music

- Awarded for: Excellence in music for animated feature productions
- Country: United States
- Presented by: ASIFA-Hollywood
- First award: 1995
- Currently held by: KPop Demon Hunters Music Team – KPop Demon Hunters (2025)
- Website: annieawards.org

The Annie Award for Outstanding Achievement for Music in a Feature Production (or Annie Award for Outstanding Achievement for Music in an Animated Feature Production) is an Annie Award given annually to the best music in an animated feature film, theatrical or direct-to-video. It began in 1997 as the Annie Award for "Best Individual Achievement: Music in a Feature/Home Video Production". Throughout the following years, the title was renamed "Outstanding Individual Achievement for Music in an Animated Feature Production", "Outstanding Individual Achievement for Music Score in an Animated Feature Production", and "Outstanding Music in an Animated Feature Production" before changing to its current title in 2005. It was retitled "Best Music in an Animated Feature Production" in 2006 for three years before being reverted to "Music in an Animated Feature Production" in 2009.

== Winners and nominees ==
†=Non-feature nominee ₳=Non-theatrical feature nominee

=== 1990s ===
Year	Film/TV	Winners and nominees
1995 (23rd)
1995 (23rd)	Pocahontas	Alan Menken (composer) and Stephen Schwartz (lyricist)
1995 (23rd)	Animaniacs †	Richard Stone
1995 (23rd)	Batman: the Animated Series †	Shirley Walker
1995 (23rd)	Dr. Seuss’ Daisy May Mayzie †	Phillip Appleby (composer) and Theodore Geisel (lyricist, posthumously)
1995 (23rd)	A Goofy Movie (Songs: "I 2 I" and "Stand Out")	Patrick DeRemier and Roy Freeland (songwriters)
1996 (24th)
1996 (24th)	Toy Story	Randy Newman
1996 (24th)	Animaniacs †	Richard Stone, Steven Bernstein and Julie Bernstein
1996 (24th)	Gargoyles †	Carl Johnson
1996 (24th)	James and the Giant Peach	Randy Newman
1996 (24th)	The Hunchback of Notre Dame	Alan Menken (composer) and Stephen Schwartz (lyricist)
1997 (25th)
1997 (25th)	Cats Don't Dance	Randy Newman
1997 (25th)	Aladdin and the King of Thieves ₳	Mark Watters and Carl Johnson
1997 (25th)	Cats Don't Dance	Steve Goldstein
1997 (25th)	The Land Before Time IV: Journey Through the Mists ₳	Leslie Bricusse
1997 (25th)	This Land Is Your Land: The Animated Kids' Songs of Woody Guthrie †	Woody Guthrie and Frank Fuchs
1998 (26th)
1998 (26th)	Mulan	Matthew Wilder and David Zippel (songs) and Jerry Goldsmith (score)
1998 (26th)	Anastasia	Stephen Flaherty and Lynn Ahrens (songs) and David Newman (score)
1998 (26th)	Beauty and the Beast: The Enchanted Christmas (Song: "As Long As There's Christmas") ₳	Rachel Portman (composer) and Don Black (lyricist)
1998 (26th)	Hercules and Xena: The Animated Movie - The Battle for Mount Olympus ₳	Michele Brourman and Amanda McBroom (songs) and Joseph LoDuca (score)
1998 (26th)	Pooh's Grand Adventure: The Search for Christopher Robin ₳	Carl Johnson
1999 (27th)
1999 (27th)	The Iron Giant	Michael Kamen
1999 (27th)	Antz	Harry Gregson-Williams and John Powell
1999 (27th)	The Lion King II: Simba's Pride (Song: "We Are One") ₳	Tom Snow, Marty Panzer and Jack Feldman (songwriters)
1999 (27th)	The Lion King II: Simba's Pride (Song: "My Lullaby") ₳	Scott Warrender and Joss Whedon (songwriters)
1999 (27th)	Tarzan (Song: "Two Worlds")	Phil Collins (composer and lyricist)

=== 2000s ===
Year	Film	Winners and nominees
2000 (28th)
2000 (28th)	Toy Story 2	Randy Newman (composer, songs and music)
2000 (28th)	Dinosaur	James Newton Howard (music)
2000 (28th)	The Road to El Dorado	Elton John, Tim Rice, Hans Zimmer and John Powell (music)
2000 (28th)	The Tigger Movie (Song: "Round My Family Tree")	Richard M. Sherman and Robert B. Sherman (music and lyrics)
2000 (28th)	Wakko's Wish ₳	Richard Stone, Steven Bernstein, Julie Bernstein, Gordon L. Goodwin and Timothy Kelly (composers)
2001 (29th)
2001 (29th)	Shrek	John Powell and Harry Gregson-Williams
2001 (29th)	Atlantis: The Lost Empire	James Newton Howard
2001 (29th)	The Emperor's New Groove	John Debney
2001 (29th)	The Little Mermaid II: Return to the Sea ₳	Danny Troob
2001 (29th)	Scooby-Doo and the Alien Invaders ₳	Louis Febre
2002 (30th)
2002 (30th)	Spirited Away	Joe Hisaishi
2002 (30th)	Ice Age	David Newman
2002 (30th)	Lilo & Stitch	Alan Silvestri and Mark Keali'i Ho'omalu
2002 (30th)	Monsters, Inc.	Randy Newman
2002 (30th)	Return to Never Land	Joel McNeely (score), Jonatha Brooke (Song: "I'll Try") and They Might Be Giants (Song: "So to Be One of Us")
2003 (31st)
2003 (31st)	Finding Nemo	Thomas Newman
2003 (31st)	Brother Bear	Phil Collins and Mark Mancina
2003 (31st)	Sinbad: Legend of the Seven Seas	Harry Gregson-Williams
2004 (32nd)
2004 (32nd)	The Incredibles	Michael Giacchino
2004 (32nd)	Ghost in the Shell 2: Innocence	Kenji Kawai
2004 (32nd)	The Lion King 1½ ₳	Don Harper, Lebo M, Johnny Clegg, Martin Erskene and Seth Friedman
2004 (32nd)	Shrek 2	Harry Gregson-Williams
2004 (32nd)	The SpongeBob SquarePants Movie	Gregor Narholz
2005 (33rd)
2005 (33rd)	Wallace & Gromit: The Curse of the Were-Rabbit	Julian Nott
2005 (33rd)	Madagascar	Hans Zimmer
2006 (34th)
2006 (34th)	Cars	Randy Newman
2006 (34th)	The Ant Bully	John Debney
2006 (34th)	Bah Humduck! A Looney Tunes Christmas ₳	Gordon Goodwin
2006 (34th)	Ice Age: The Meltdown	John Powell
2006 (34th)	A Monkey's Tale	Laura Karpman
2007 (35th)
2007 (35th)	Ratatouille	Michael Giacchino
2007 (35th)	Bee Movie	Rupert Gregson-Williams
2007 (35th)	Disney Princess Enchanted Tales: Follow Your Dreams ₳	Amy Powers, Russ DeSalvo and Jeff Danna
2007 (35th)	Meet the Robinsons	Danny Elfman, Rufus Wainwright and Rob Thomas
2007 (35th)	Persepolis	Olivier Bernet
2008 (36th)
2008 (36th)	Kung Fu Panda	Hans Zimmer and John Powell
2008 (36th)	Batman: Gotham Knight ₳	Kevin Manthei
2008 (36th)	Horton Hears a Who!	John Powell
2008 (36th)	The Tale of Despereaux	William Ross
2008 (36th)	Waltz with Bashir	Max Richter
2009 (37th)
2009 (37th)	Coraline	Bruno Coulais
2009 (37th)	Ice Age: Dawn of the Dinosaurs	John Powell
2009 (37th)	Ponyo	Joe Hisaishi
2009 (37th)	Up	Michael Giacchino

=== 2010s ===
Year	Film	Winners and nominees
2010 (38th)
2010 (38th)	How to Train Your Dragon	John Powell
2010 (38th)	Despicable Me	Heitor Pereira
2010 (38th)	The Illusionist	Sylvain Chomet
2010 (38th)	Legend of the Guardians: The Owls of Ga'Hoole	David Hirschfelder
2010 (38th)	Shrek Forever After	Harry Gregson-Williams
2011 (39th)
2011 (39th)	The Adventures of Tintin	John Williams
2011 (39th)	Puss in Boots	Henry Jackman
2011 (39th)	Rio	Mikael Mutti, Siedah Garrett, Carlinhos Brown, Sergio Mendes and John Powell
2011 (39th)	Winnie the Pooh	Kristen Anderson-Lopez, Robert Lopez, Zooey Deschanel and Henry Jackman
2012 (40th)
2012 (40th)	Wreck-It Ralph	Henry Jackman, Skrillex, Adam Young, Matthew Thiessen, Jamie Houston and Yasushi Akimoto
2012 (40th)	Adventures in Zambezia	Bruce Retief
2012 (40th)	Brave	Patrick Doyle, Mark Andrews and Alex Mandel
2012 (40th)	Hotel Transylvania	Mark Mothersbaugh
2012 (40th)	The Lorax	John Powell and Cinco Paul
2012 (40th)	Ice Age: Continental Drift	John Powell, Adam Schlesinger and Ester Dean
2012 (40th)	Rise of the Guardians	Alexandre Desplat
2012 (40th)	Secret of the Wings	Joel McNeely, Brendan Milburn and Valerie Vigoda
2013 (41st)
2013 (41st)	Frozen	Kristen Anderson-Lopez, Robert Lopez and Christophe Beck
2013 (41st)	Cloudy with a Chance of Meatballs 2	Mark Mothersbaugh
2013 (41st)	The Croods	Alan Silvestri
2013 (41st)	Despicable Me 2	Heitor Pereira and Pharrell Williams
2013 (41st)	Epic	Danny Elfman
2013 (41st)	Free Birds	Dominic Lewis
2013 (41st)	Monsters University	Randy Newman
2013 (41st)	Turbo	Henry Jackman
2014 (42nd)
2014 (42nd)	How to Train Your Dragon 2	John Powell and Jónsi
2014 (42nd)	Cheatin'	Nicole Renaud
2014 (42nd)	Mr. Peabody & Sherman	Danny Elfman
2014 (42nd)	Song of the Sea	Bruno Coulais and Kíla
2014 (42nd)	The Tale of the Princess Kaguya	Joe Hisaishi
2015 (43rd)
2015 (43rd)	Inside Out	Michael Giacchino
2015 (43rd)	Anomalisa	Carter Burwell
2015 (43rd)	Batman Unlimited: Monster Mayhem ₳	Kevin Riepl
2015 (43rd)	Boy and the World	Ruben Feffer and Gustavo Kurlat
2015 (43rd)	The Good Dinosaur	Mychael Danna and Jeff Danna
2016 (44th)
2016 (44th)	The Little Prince	Hans Zimmer, Richard Harvey and Camille
2016 (44th)	Batman: Return of the Caped Crusaders ₳	Kristopher Carter, Lolita Ritmanis and Michael McCuistion
2016 (44th)	Sing	Joby Talbot
2016 (44th)	The Red Turtle	Laurent Perez del Mar
2016 (44th)	The Secret Life of Pets	Alexandre Desplat
2017 (45th)
2017 (45th)	Coco	Kristen Anderson-Lopez, Robert Lopez, Germaine Franco, Adrian Molina and Michael Giacchino
2017 (45th)	Captain Underpants: The First Epic Movie	Theodore Shapiro
2017 (45th)	Loving Vincent	Clint Mansell
2017 (45th)	Olaf's Frozen Adventure †	Kate Anderson, Elyssa Samsel, Christophe Beck and Jeff Morrow
2017 (45th)	The Breadwinner	Jeff Danna and Mychael Danna
2018 (46th)
2018 (46th)	Incredibles 2	Michael Giacchino
2018 (46th)	The Grinch	Danny Elfman and Tyler, the Creator
2018 (46th)	Early Man	Harry Gregson-Williams and Tom Howe
2018 (46th)	Ralph Breaks the Internet	Henry Jackman, Tom MacDougall, Dan Reynolds, Alan Menken and Phil Johnston
2018 (46th)	Smallfoot	Heitor Pereira, Karey Kirkpatrick and Wayne Kirkpatrick
2019 (47th)
2019 (47th)	I Lost My Body	Dan Levy
2019 (47th)	Away	Gints Zilbalodis
2019 (47th)	Frozen 2	Kristen Anderson-Lopez, Robert Lopez, Frode Fjellheim and Christophe Beck
2019 (47th)	Spies in Disguise	Theodore Shapiro and Mark Ronson
2019 (47th)	Toy Story 4	Randy Newman

=== 2020s ===
Year	Film	Winners and nominees
2020 (48th)
2020 (48th)	Soul	Trent Reznor, Atticus Ross and Jon Batiste
2020 (48th)	Onward	Mychael Danna and Jeff Danna
2020 (48th)	Over the Moon	Steven Price, Christopher Curtis, Marjorie Duffield and Helen Park
2020 (48th)	The Willoughbys	Mark Mothersbaugh, Alessia Cara, Jon Levine and Colton Fisher
2020 (48th)	Wolfwalkers	Bruno Coulais and Kíla
2021 (49th)
2021 (49th)	Encanto	Germaine Franco and Lin-Manuel Miranda
2021 (49th)	Luca	Dan Romer
2021 (49th)	Poupelle of Chimney Town	Youki Kojima and Yuta Bandoh
2021 (49th)	Raya and the Last Dragon	James Newton Howard and Jhené Aiko
2021 (49th)	Vivo	Lin-Manuel Miranda and Alex Lacamoire
2022 (50th)
2022 (50th)	Guillermo del Toro's Pinocchio	Alexandre Desplat, Roeban Katz, Guillermo del Toro and Patrick McHale
2022 (50th)	Turning Red	Ludwig Göransson, Billie Eilish and Finneas O'Connell
2022 (50th)	Mad God	Dan Wool
2022 (50th)	The Bad Guys	Daniel Pemberton
2022 (50th)	The Sea Beast	Mark Mancina, Nell Benjamin and Laurence O'Keefe
2023 (51st)
2023 (51st)	Spider-Man: Across the Spider-Verse	Daniel Pemberton and Metro Boomin
2023 (51st)	The Boy and the Heron	Joe Hisaishi
2023 (51st)	Elemental	Thomas Newman and Lauv
2023 (51st)	Suzume	Kazuma Jinnouchi and RADWIMPS
2023 (51st)	Teenage Mutant Ninja Turtles: Mutant Mayhem	Trent Reznor and Atticus Ross
2024 (52nd)	The Wild Robot	Kris Bowers
2024 (52nd)	Kensuke's Kingdom	Stuart Hancock
2024 (52nd)	Piece by Piece	Pharrell Williams and Michael Andrews
2024 (52nd)	That Christmas	John Powell, Ed Sheeran and Johnny McDaid
2024 (52nd)	Wallace & Gromit: Vengeance Most Fowl	Lorne Balfe and Julian Nott
2025 (53rd)	KPop Demon Hunters	KPop Demon Hunters Music Team
2025 (53rd)	Arco	Arnaud Toulon
2025 (53rd)	Elio	Rob Simonsen
2025 (53rd)	Little Amélie or the Character of Rain	Mari Fukuhara
2025 (53rd)	Zootopia 2	Shakira, Ed Sheeran, Blake Slatkin and Michael Giacchino

== Award Records ==
=== Multiple Wins ===
5 wins

- Michael Giacchino

4 wins

- Randy Newman
- John Powell

2 wins

- Kristen Anderson-Lopez
- Germaine Franco
- Robert Lopez
- Hans Zimmer

=== Multiple Nominations ===
13 nominations

- John Powell

8 nominations

- Randy Newman

7 nominations

- Michael Giacchino

6 nominations

- Harry Gregson-Williams

5 nominations

- Henry Jackman

4 nominations

- Kristen Anderson-Lopez
- Jeff Danna
- Danny Elfman
- Joe Hisaishi
- Robert Lopez
- Hans Zimmer

3 nominations

- Christophe Beck
- Bruno Coulais
- Mychael Danna
- Alexandre Desplat
- James Newton Howard
- Alan Menken
- Mark Mothersbaugh
- Heitor Pereira
- Richard Stone

2 nominations

- Steven Bernstein
- Phil Collins
- John Debney
- Germaine Franco
- Carl Johnson
- Kíla
- Mark Mancina
- Joel McNeely
- Lin-Manuel Miranda
- David Newman
- Thomas Newman
- Julian Nott
- Daniel Pemberton
- Trent Reznor
- Atticus Ross
- Stephen Schwartz
- Ed Sheeran
- Theodore Shapiro
- Alan Silvestri

== See also ==
- Hollywood Music in Media Award for Best Original Score in an Animated Film
