= The Lion King (franchise) =

Disney media franchise

- Created by: Irene Mecchi; Jonathan Roberts; Linda Woolverton
- Original work: The Lion King (1994)
- Owner: The Walt Disney Company
- Years: 1994–present

Print publications
- Book: The Lion King: Six New Adventures

Films and television
- Films: The Lion King (1994); The Lion King (2019); Mufasa: The Lion King (2024)
- Short films: Circle of Life: An Environmental Fable (1995); Wild About Safety (2008–2013); It's UnBungalievable (2016)
- Animated series: The Lion King's Timon & Pumbaa (1995–1999); The Lion Guard (2016–2019)
- Television film: The Lion Guard: Return of the Roar (2015)
- Direct-to-video: The Lion King II: Simba's Pride (1998); The Lion King 1½ (2004); Black Is King (2020)

Theatrical presentations
- Plays: List of plays
- Musicals: The Lion King (1997–present); Festival of the Lion King (1998–present)

Games
- Video games: The Lion King (1994); Timon & Pumbaa's Jungle Games (1995); The Lion King II: Simba's Pride (1998); The Lion King: Simba's Mighty Adventure (2000); The Lion King 1½ (2003)

Audio
- Soundtracks: The Lion King: Original Motion Picture Soundtrack (1994); The Lion King – Original Broadway Cast Recording (1997); The Lion King: Original London Cast Recording (2000); The Lion King: Original Motion Picture Soundtrack (2019); Mufasa: The Lion King (Original Motion Picture Soundtrack) (2024)
- Original music: Rhythm of the Pride Lands (1995); The Lion King: The Gift (2019)

Miscellaneous
- Theme park attractions: The Legend of The Lion King (1994–2002, 2004–2009); The Lion King Celebration (1994–1997); Circle of Life: An Environmental Fable (1995–2018); Festival of the Lion King (1998–present)

The Lion King is a Disney media franchise comprising a film series and additional media. The success of animated original 1994 American feature film, The Lion King, directed by Roger Allers and Rob Minkoff, led to a direct-to-video sequel and prequel, a photorealistically animated remake in 2019, a 2024 prequel/sequel to the 2019 film, a television film sequel, two spin-off television series, three educational shorts, several video games, merchandise, and the third-longest-running musical in Broadway history, which garnered six Tony Awards including Best Musical. The franchise is one of the highest-grossing media franchises of all time. The franchise as a whole has EGOT-ed, meaning it has won the four biggest awards of American show business.

The franchise mainly revolves about a pride of lions who oversee a large swath of African savanna as their "kingdom" known as the Pride Lands, with their leader Simba watching over it as "king". The first three animated feature films are widely known for being influenced by the works of William Shakespeare, as well as other works based on his material. It is one of Disney's most lucrative franchises, with earnings estimated to be exceeding $11.6 billion as of 2019.

== Films ==
Film	U.S release date	Director(s)	Screenwriter(s)	Story by	Producers	Production companies	Distributors
Traditionally animated feature films
The Lion King	June 24, 1994	Roger Allers and Rob Minkoff	Irene Mecchi, Jonathan Roberts and Linda Woolverton	Brenda Chapman, Barry Johnson, Andy Gaskill, Kevin Harkey, Tom Sito, Rick Maki, Burny Mattinson, Lorna Cook, Gary Trousdale, Jorgen Klubien, Larry Leker, Ed Gombert, Mark Kausler, Thom Enriquez, Jim Capobianco, Chris Sanders, Joe Ranft and Francis Glebas	Don Hahn	Walt Disney Pictures and Walt Disney Feature Animation	Buena Vista Pictures Distribution
The Lion King II: Simba's Pride	October 27, 1998	Darrell Rooney and Rob LaDuca	Flip Kobler and Cindy Marcus	Flip Kobler and Cindy Marcus	Jeannine Roussel	Walt Disney Video Premiere, Walt Disney Television Animation, Walt Disney Animation Australia and Walt Disney Animation Canada	Walt Disney Home Video
The Lion King 1½	February 10, 2004	Bradley Raymond	Tom Rogers	Tom Rogers	George A. Mendoza	Disneytoon Studios and Walt Disney Animation Australia	Walt Disney Studios Home Entertainment
Photorealistic CGI animated feature films
The Lion King	July 19, 2019	Jon Favreau	Jeff Nathanson	Jeff Nathanson	Jon Favreau, Jeffrey Silver and Karen Gilchrist	Walt Disney Pictures and Fairview Entertainment	Walt Disney Studios Motion Pictures
Mufasa: The Lion King	December 20, 2024	Barry Jenkins	Jeff Nathanson	Jeff Nathanson	Adele Romanski and Mark Ceryak	Walt Disney Pictures	Walt Disney Studios Motion Pictures
Musical film
Black Is King	July 31, 2020	Beyoncé	Beyoncé, Yrsa Daley-Ward, Clover Hope and Andrew Morrow	Beyoncé, Yrsa Daley-Ward, Clover Hope and Andrew Morrow	Jeremy Sullivan, Jimi Adesanya, Blitz Bazawule, Ben Cooper, Astrid Edwards, Durwin Julies, Yoli Mes, Dafe Oboro, Akin Omotoso, Will Whitney, Lauren Baker, Jason Baum, Alex Chamberlain, Robert Day, Christophe Faubert, Brien Justiniano, Rethabile Molatela Mothobi, Sylvia Zakhary, Nathan Scherrer and Erinn Williams	Parkwood Entertainment and Walt Disney Pictures	Disney+

=== Traditionally animated feature films ===
==== The Lion King ====
The Lion King is the original film of the franchise. It was directed by Roger Allers and Rob Minkoff. It was produced by Walt Disney Feature Animation, premiered in selected cities on June 15, 1994, and widely released in theaters on June 24 by Walt Disney Pictures. The Lion King belongs to an era known as the Disney Renaissance. The plot of the film is influenced by William Shakespeare's play Hamlet, and is believed to have been inspired by Osamu Tezuka's 1960s Japanese anime series Kimba the White Lion.

==== Around the World with Timon and Pumbaa ====
The series The Lion King's Timon & Pumbaa had a direct-to-video film named Around the World with Timon and Pumbaa, with Nathan Lane and Ernie Sabella reprising their roles as Timon and Pumbaa respectively. The story tells of Pumbaa getting struck by lightning, losing all his memory, and Timon helps refrain every moment they spent. After Pumbaa gets his memory back, lightning strikes Timon losing his memory this time, making Pumbaa break the fourth wall by telling the viewers to rewind the tape to start at the beginning, being it was the only way to help Timon remember. Several episodes from the series are featured in this film. Aside from this film, two other DVDs, Dining Out... and On Holiday... are an hour compilation of other episodes of the series. No DVDs have been released in the U.S. but were released on VHS.

==== The Lion King II: Simba's Pride ====
The Lion King II: Simba's Pride was released by Walt Disney Studios Home Entertainment on VHS in the United States on October 27, 1998. It was directed by Darrell Rooney and co-directed by Rob LaDuca. It was first released on DVD as a limited issue on November 23, 1999, and placed into moratorium until it was again released on DVD on August 31, 2004, when it was a two-disc special edition. The plot of this animated film is heavily influenced by another Shakespeare play, Romeo and Juliet.

==== The Lion King 1½ ====
The Lion King 1½, also known as The Lion King 3: Hakuna Matata in some countries, is the second and final direct-to-video installment of the film series. It was directed by Bradley Raymond and released by Walt Disney Home Entertainment on February 10, 2004. The film is a chronologically concurrent sequel to the first film, focusing on Timon and Pumbaa. It was somewhat influenced by Tom Stoppard's play Rosencrantz and Guildenstern Are Dead, in which the title characters are seen in every major event of Hamlet.

=== The Lion Guard television movies ===
==== The Lion Guard: Return of the Roar ====
The Lion Guard: Return of the Roar is a television movie that premiered on November 22, 2015, serving as a pilot for The Lion Guard television series, which debuted in early 2016 on Disney Junior. Return of the Roar was directed by Howy Parkins and written by Ford Riley. The film focuses on Simba and Nala's cub Kion, who as second-born to the throne, becomes leader of the Lion Guard, a group that protects the Pride Lands and defends the Circle of Life. As leader of the Lion Guard, Kion is gifted with a power called the Roar of the Elders which when used, causes the great lion spirits of the Pride Lands' past to roar with him. Going against tradition, Kion chooses non-lions to be members of his guard; his friends Bunga the honey badger, Ono the egret, Beshte the hippo, and Fuli the cheetah.

==== The Lion Guard: The Rise of Scar ====
A television movie, or extended episode, which premiered on July 29, 2017, on Disney Channel during season 2 of The Lion Guard. As the dry season begins, the Lion Guard continues to protect the Pride Lands, and Rafiki takes on an apprentice named Makini. Meanwhile, Janja the hyena and his clan, along with their new ally Ushari the cobra, orchestrate events that allow them to summon the spirit of Scar in order to defeat the Lion Guard and take over the Pride Lands.

==== The Lion Guard: Battle for the Pride Lands ====
A television movie which premiered on August 3, 2019, on Disney Channel during season 3 of The Lion Guard. In the film, Scar enacts the final stage of his plan against the Pride Lands, and the Lion Guard begin a final battle with him which dovetails into the events which separate the Lion Guard from the rest of the Pride Lands during the events of Simba's Pride.

=== Photorealistic CGI animated feature films ===
==== The Lion King ====
A photorealistic computer-generated imagery remake of The Lion King was directed by Jon Favreau and produced through his production company Fairview Entertainment. The film's voice cast features Donald Glover as Simba, Chiwetel Ejiofor as Scar, Beyoncé as Nala, Alfre Woodard as Sarabi, John Oliver as Zazu, John Kani as Rafiki, Billy Eichner and Seth Rogen as Timon and Pumbaa, and James Earl Jones reprised his role as Mufasa. The remake was released on July 19, 2019.

==== Mufasa: The Lion King ====
A follow-up film titled Mufasa: The Lion King was directed by Barry Jenkins, from a screenplay by and Jeff Nathanson, who returned from the 2019 film. While it has been referred to as a prequel, the film is set after the events of the 2019 film while also exploring Mufasa's formative years. Aaron Pierre voiced young Mufasa and Kelvin Harrison Jr. voiced young Scar. The film was released in December 2024.

=== Other films ===
==== Black Is King ====
A visual companion to the 2019 Beyoncé soundtrack album The Lion King: The Gift, curated by the singer herself for the film The Lion King (2019). The film tells the story of a young African prince who is exiled from his kingdom after his father's death, as an allegory for the African diaspora's journey of discovering, reclaiming and celebrating their culture and heritage, which is echoed by the inclusion of spoken-word poetry that focuses on the question of black identity. It was directed by Beyoncé herself, Emmanuel Adjei, Blitz Bazawule, Pierre Debusschere, Jenn Nkiru, Ibra Ake, Dikayl Rimmasch and Jake Nava. The film was released globally on Disney+ in 2020.

== Television series ==
Series	Season	Episodes		Originally released		
Series	Season	Episodes		First released	Last released	Network
The Lion King's Timon & Pumbaa	1	25 (53 segments)	13 (26 segments)	September 8, 1995	December 29, 1995	Syndicated
The Lion King's Timon & Pumbaa	1	25 (53 segments)	12 (27 segments)	September 16, 1995	December 16, 1995	CBS
The Lion King's Timon & Pumbaa	2	21 (40 segments)	13 (24 segments)	September 2, 1996	November 25, 1996	Syndicated
The Lion King's Timon & Pumbaa	2	21 (40 segments)	8 (16 segments)	September 14, 1996	November 9, 1996	CBS
The Lion King's Timon & Pumbaa	3	39 (78 segments)		January 1, 1999	September 24, 1999	Toon Disney
The Lion Guard	Pilot			November 22, 2015		Disney Channel
The Lion Guard	1	26		January 15, 2016	April 21, 2017	Disney Junior
The Lion Guard	2	29		July 7, 2017	April 22, 2019	Disney Junior
The Lion Guard	3	19		August 3, 2019	November 3, 2019	Disney Junior

=== The Lion King's Timon & Pumbaa ===
The Lion King's Timon & Pumbaa is a spin-off cartoon series that follows the adventures of Timon and Pumbaa (and occasionally, the film's other supporting characters). The show ran for three seasons, airing on the syndicated block The Disney Afternoon and CBS in the United States, and BBS in Canada from September 8, 1995, to November 1, 1998. It had Bobs Gannaway and Tony Craig serving as the executive producers for the first two seasons. As of Season 3, the show was produced by Chris Bartleman and Blair Peters, with Tedd and Patsy Cameron-Anasti serving as the executive producers. Since February 8, 2009 (after its final airing on the now-defunct Toon Disney before replaced by Disney XD), this show was no longer on the air, but returned along with some other favorites on March 23, 2012, for a limited time, as part of the new Disney Jr. TV channel. The series uses fast-paced slapstick comedy in order to convey life lessons to young viewers.

=== The Lion Guard ===
A second TV show called The Lion Guard premiered on Disney Junior and Disney Channel; it first appeared as a television movie called The Lion Guard: Return of the Roar which debuted on November 22, 2015, followed by a series which began airing on January 15, 2016. A preschool-oriented spin-off, the series was developed by Ford Riley, who also serves as writer and executive producer. It centers around Simba and Nala's second-born cub Kion, who becomes leader of the Lion Guard, a team that protects the Pride Lands and defends the Circle of Life. As leader of the Lion Guard, Kion is gifted with a power called the Roar of the Elders which when used, causes the great lion spirits of the Pride Lands' past to roar with him. The Lion Guard is a sequel to The Lion King and takes place during the time-gap within the 1998 film, The Lion King II: Simba's Pride, with the last two episodes of Season 3 taking place after the events of that film. Various characters from the first two films also make appearances in the show, including Kiara, Timon, Pumbaa, Rafiki, Zazu, and Mufasa. New characters Bunga the honey badger, Ono the egret, Beshte the hippo, and Fuli the cheetah are Kion's friends and members of his Lion Guard.

== Shorts ==
=== Find Out Why ===
Find Out Why is a short educational series that features Timon and Pumbaa answering science questions like why there is lightning, why pandas don't live in deserts, why there is wind, and why an airplane flies. These shorts are for educational purposes at schools, non-residential and residential uses for people, including students and kids everywhere in the world.

=== Timon and Pumbaa's Wild About Safety ===
Together with Timon (voiced by Bruce Lanoil) and Pumbaa (voiced by Ernie Sabella), students learn a variety of safety lessons for around the house, for the environment, and for in the water that will help themselves and others avoid injuries, live problem-free, and be Safety Smart. At the end of each episode, Timon and Pumbaa sing a musical number reviewing all that they learned on the episode in question.

A series of shorts based on the "Wild About Safety" series, called "Safety Smart: On the Go!", was also released. Based on the "Wild About Safety" episode of the same name, "Safety Smart: On the Go" is a series of shorts that detail topics on how to be safe when traveling, such as when riding vehicles, using bikes & scooters, walking to travel as pedestrians, or even when visiting amusement parks. The "Safety Smart: On the Go!" short series is most well known for being displayed in resorts in Walt Disney World (Florida) & Disneyland (California), in addition to a "Wild About Safety" video about how to be safe in resort hotels & the original "Wild About Safety" episode that the "Safety Smart: On the Go!" short series is based on.

=== It's UnBungalievable ===
A short-form series in which Bunga and Ono from The Lion Guard pick two animals to compete in contests such as "Who's Quicker?" "Who Has Better Hair?" and "Who's Hungrier?" The series features live-action animal footage provided by Disneynature.

== Theatrical ==
=== Theme park attractions ===
The Legend of the Lion King was an underground stage performance retelling the story of the film using fully articulated puppets in Magic Kingdom's Fantasyland. This attraction ran from June 1994 to February 2002.

A Broadway-caliber short-form stage musical named Festival of the Lion King (formerly known as A Celebration of the Festival of the Lion King) is performed live in Disney's Animal Kingdom at Walt Disney World, Florida and in Adventureland at Hong Kong Disneyland. It uses the concept of tribal celebration in combination with ideas from Disney's Electrical Parade. The show is in the form of a revue, and not a condensed version of either the film or Broadway show. However, it features the award-winning music from the first film, written by Elton John and Tim Rice. The show uses songs, dance, puppetry and visual effects to create an African savannah setting filled with lions, elephants, giraffes, birds, zebras and gazelles.

=== Broadway musical ===
A Broadway musical, based on Disney's 1994 animated feature film, debuted July 8, 1997, in Minneapolis, Minnesota at the Orpheum Theatre. Directed by Julie Taymor, produced by Disney Theatrical Productions, and written by the co-director of the original film, Roger Allers, with writer Irene Mecchi. The musical features actors in elaborate animal costumes, and complex puppetry, created by Taymor and Michael Curry. The musical is divided in two acts and has music by Elton John and lyrics by Tim Rice, along with the musical score created by Hans Zimmer with choral arrangements by Lebo M. The musical incorporates several changes and additions to the storyline as compared to the film, as well as adding more songs.

The musical became a success even before premiering on Broadway at the New Amsterdam Theater on October 15, 1997, in previews with the official opening on November 13 the same year. On June 13, 2006, the Broadway production moved to the Minskoff Theatre to make way for the musical version of Mary Poppins, where it is still running. It is now Broadway's third-longest-running show in history. The show debuted in the West End's Lyceum Theatre on October 19, 1999, and is still running. The cast of the West End production were invited to perform at the Royal Variety Performance 2008 at the London Palladium on December 11, in the presence of senior members of the British royal family. Other productions within the U.S. include a Los Angeles production at the Pantages Theatre, in Charlotte at the Blumenthal Performing Arts Center, and a Las Vegas production at Mandalay Bay. International productions include a British at the Lyceum Theatre in London, a Canadian at the Princess of Wales Theatre in Toronto, a Mexican in Mexico City, and a South African in Johannesburg, among others. The first ever UK tour opened at Bristol Hippodrome on August 31, 2012.

== Video games ==
Two video games based on the first film have been released. The first, titled The Lion King, was published in 1994 by Virgin and was released for the Nintendo Entertainment System (only in Europe), Super NES, Game Boy, Master System, Mega Drive/Genesis, Game Gear, MS-DOS, and Amiga. The second game, called The Lion King: Simba's Mighty Adventure, was published in 2000 by Activision and was released for the PlayStation and Game Boy Color. It was based on the first film and its storyline continued into The Lion King II: Simba's Pride.

In 1995, Disney Interactive released Timon & Pumbaa's Jungle Games for Microsoft Windows, in 1996 for MacIntosh, and in 1997 for Super NES.

In 1998, a party game titled The Lion King II: Simba's Pride, based on the direct-to-video film, was released for Microsoft Windows, developed by Disney Interactive Victoria.

In the Disney Interactive and Square Enix video game Kingdom Hearts, Simba appears as an ally that Sora can summon during battles. He also appears again as a summon character in Kingdom Hearts: Chain of Memories and Kingdom Hearts III. In Kingdom Hearts II, the Pride Lands are a playable world and a number of characters from the film appear, including Nala, Timon, Pumbaa, Rafiki and Mufasa, with Scar, Shenzi, Banzai, and Ed serving as enemies.

A game called The Lion King 1½ was published in 2003 for the Game Boy Advance, based on the direct-to-video film.

Young Simba, Young Nala, Timon, Pumbaa, and Rafiki appear as playable characters in Disney's Extreme Skate Adventure, while Pride Rock, Elephant Graveyard, and Scar's Canyon are playable levels. Scar, Zazu, Shenzi, Banzai, and Ed appear as non-playable characters.

Simba is a character in the video game Disney Friends, where the player can interact with him. Timon and Pumbaa also appear as supporting characters in game.

In the video game Disney Magic Kingdoms, a limited time Event based on The Lion King introduced Simba, Nala, Timon, Pumbaa, Rafiki, Zazu, and Scar as playable characters, as well as some attractions based on locations of the film. Shenzi, Banzai, and Ed were also included as playable characters in a later update of the game. In the game the characters are involved in new storylines that serve as a continuation of The Lion King (ignoring other materials in the franchise).

== Other media ==
=== Theme park attractions ===
In addition, Rafiki and Timon appear at Disney Parks and Resorts as meet and greet characters.

==== Circle of Life: An Environmental Fable ====
A 70 mm film entitled Circle of Life: An Environmental Fable is shown in the Harvest Theater in The Land Pavilion at Epcot in Walt Disney World, Orlando, Florida. It opened on January 21, 1995, replacing Symbiosis. It stars the characters from The Lion King, where the story follows Timon and Pumbaa chopping down trees and clogging up rivers to build the Hakuna Matata Lakeside Village. Simba comes to them and explains how their actions are harmful to nature. This lesson is explained with live-action footage, some left over from Symbiosis. The film closed on February 3, 2018.

==== The Lion King Celebration ====
The Lion King Celebration was a parade based on the film that ran at Disneyland from June 1, 1994, to June 1, 1997. It was designed as though the story of Simba was a tale passed down in Africa for generations. The parade featured six floats designed around different aspects of Africa, dancers dressed in animal costumes and a Pride Rock float featuring Simba and Nala.

==== Lion King area ====
In August 2024, it was announced that a Lion King area with a log flume ride based on the original 1994 animated film, will be added to Disney Adventure World at Disneyland Paris. More details were released in August 2026 at D23: The Ultimate Disney Fan Event 2026, which revealed that the land will feature an attraction with iconic moments and songs.

=== Books ===
The film's book adaptation was written by Gina Ingoglia and illustrated by Marshall Toomey and Michael Humphries.

The Lion King: Six New Adventures, a collection of six spin-off books was published in 1994 by Grolier Enterprises Inc. These books were approved by Disney and take place after The Lion King. The story of these books center around Kopa, the son of Simba who is mischievous and adventurous but good-hearted just like his father was when he was young. In each book, while doing mischief Kopa learns a life-lesson and meets up with Rafiki who gives him wisdom by narrating the past tales of the Pridelands.

=== House of Mouse ===
Many characters from The Lion King appear in the Disney animated series House of Mouse. Some of them also appear in the series' spin-off films Mickey's Magical Christmas: Snowed in at the House of Mouse and Mickey's House of Villains.

=== Digital apps ===
A digital storybook app called The Lion King: Timon's Tale retelling the story of The Lion King from Timon's point-of-view was released on February 24. 2012 for iOS devices.

=== Fan sites ===
The fan website The Lion King WWW Archive was highlighted by Variety as a top animation related website in 1997, soon after it was started in 1995 by Brian Tiemann, then a student at CalTech, and remains online as of 2025. Tiemann attended a tenth anniversary event for the original film in 2004 that included members of the production team.

== Plot and themes ==
The story is set in a kingdom of anthropomorphic animals in Africa known as the Pride Lands, where a lion rules over the other animals as king. The Lion King begins when Rafiki, a mandrill, anoints Simba, the newborn son of King Mufasa and Queen Sarabi, presenting him to a gathering of animals at the Pride Rock. Simba is next seen as a young cub, with Mufasa teaching him about the "Circle of Life". Simba's uncle and Mufasa's brother Scar plots to take the throne for himself and tells Simba about an elephant graveyard, a place where Mufasa has warned Simba not to go. When Simba and his best friend Nala sneak off to the elephant graveyard, Shenzi, Banzai and Ed, three hyenas aligned with Scar, attack and try to kill the two cubs, but they are stopped by Mufasa. Scar's next plan is to lure Simba into a gorge while the hyenas create a wildebeest stampede. Alerted by Scar, Mufasa races to rescue Simba from the stampede. He saves his son but is left clinging to the edge of a cliff, which results in Scar flinging him into the stampede below and killing him. Scar then tricks Simba into thinking that he is responsible for his father's death and tells him to run away, only to later order the hyenas to kill Simba, but they fail. Scar informs the pride that both Mufasa and Simba were killed and that he is assuming the throne as the next in line. Simba is later found unconscious by Timon and Pumbaa, who adopt and raise him. It is not until Simba is a young adult lion that he meets Nala again, and the two lions fall in love. Along with Rafiki and Mufasa's ghost, Nala convinces Simba to return to the Pride Lands and claim the throne. Simba, along with Nala, Timon, and Pumbaa go to the Pride Rock, where Simba confronts, fights, and defeats Scar, who is later betrayed and killed by his own army of hyenas as a result of Scar's blaming of the hyenas for Mufasa's death. The film concludes with the Pride Lands turning green with life again and Rafiki presenting Simba and Nala's newborn cub.

The Lion King's Timon & Pumbaa follows the further adventures of the titular meerkat and warthog duo, as they continue to live by their problem-free philosophy Hakuna Matata. Timon and Pumbaa are seen having their own (mis)adventures both within' and outside of the Serengeti, encountering new allies and enemies throughout their journey, such as Speedy the Snail, Boss Beaver, and human nemesis Quint. The series also has episodes centering respectively on Rafiki, Zazu, and hyena trio Shenzi, Banzai, and Ed. Simba himself also makes recurring appearances throughout the show. The episode "Once Upon a Timon" reveals the (original) story of how Timon and Pumbaa first met and how their friendship came to be.

The Lion King II: Simba's Pride begins with the presentation of Simba and Nala's daughter named Kiara. Simba is very protective of his daughter and assigns Timon and Pumbaa to be her guardians. One day, the young cub sneaks into the Outlands, the place in which a group of lions loyal to Scar called the Outsiders reside after Simba exiles them from the Pride Lands. In the Outlands, Kiara meets a young male cub named Kovu, Scar's hand-chosen successor, and the two of them befriend each other until Simba and Kovu's mother, Zira arrive and a fight between Pride Landers and Outsiders almost takes place. Later in the film, Zira decides that she can use Kovu's new friendship with Kiara to get her revenge against Simba. Kiara is next seen as an adolescent lioness and is set to go for her first solo-hunt, but discovers that her father still sends Timon and Pumbaa to watch her. Furious, Kiara goes further from home until Zira's other children, Nuka and Vitani, set fire to the plains where Kiara is hunting, causing her to faint and giving Kovu the chance to rescue her. Simba finds that Kovu has helped Kiara and reluctantly allows him into the Pride Lands. While Simba struggles with the idea of accepting Kovu, Kiara and Kovu eventually fall in love. One morning, Simba invites Kovu for a walk but they are ambushed by Zira and her pride. They attack Simba but, while chasing him, Nuka got killed by the logs, resulting in Zira blaming and scratching Kovu for his death giving him a scar over his left eye. A wounded Simba exiles Kovu as he thinks Kovu was behind the ambush, but Kiara, knowing that Kovu would never do such a thing, runs away from Pride Rock against her father's orders and reunites with Kovu and convinces him to return with her to reunite their prides. Meanwhile, Zira leads her pride in a war against Simba and the Pridelanders and a fierce battle breaks out. Kovu and Kiara leap between them and Kiara reminds her father that, by his own words, "we are one". Zira refuses to end the battle, but Vitani and the other Outsiders understand Kiara's words and abandon their leader and join the Pridelanders. Now alone, Zira leaps for Simba, but Kiara pushes her away and they fall over a cliff. Kiara lands on a rock, but Zira slips and falls into the lake to death. Simba allows the Outsiders, including Kovu, to return to the Pride Lands, and Kovu is allowed to stand with Kiara at the top of Pride Rock.

The Lion King 1½ is a retelling of the events of the first film from Timon and Pumbaa's perspective. It also tells the story of Timon's origin, how he first met Pumbaa, and how their friendship came to be, serving as a reimagined version of the "Once Upon a Timon" episode of The Lion King's Timon & Pumbaa.

In The Lion Guard, the majority of the series takes place after Kiara meets Kovu, but before her first hunt. The series follows the adventures of Simba and Nala's son Kion as he assembles the titular group of animals to protect the Pride Lands. In Season 2, Scar, the antagonist of the original film, makes his return in the animated series as a flame spirit, and plots revenge against Simba and plans to overthrow him as King by gathering up all the Outlanders to form an army. In the special "Battle for the Pride Lands" which serves as a prequel and pilot for Season 3, Kion continues to battle the spirit of Scar. In a series of events (ones involving Janja's betrayal of Scar), Kion managed to defeat and destroy Scar forever, but not before receiving a facial wound identical to his great uncle's, courtesy of the cobra Ushari (who is later killed in the fight). Season 3 featured Kion journeying throughout the Pride Lands to the Tree of Life to heal his scar before the venom corrupts him into the lion Scar once was. The last 2 episodes of Season 3 take place after the war between Simba's pride & Zira's outsiders.

== Cast and characters ==
A total of thirteen supervising animators from Walt Disney Animation Studios and Disney's Hollywood Studios were responsible for establishing the personalities and setting the tone for the first film's main characters. The animation team studied real-life animals for reference, as was done for the earlier film Bambi. The animation of the characters was created with supervision by wildlife experts such as Jim Fowler, who visited the studio on several occasions with an assortment of lions and other jungle inhabitants to discuss behavior and help the animators give their drawings an authentic feel. He taught them how lions greet one another by gently butting heads, and show affection by placing one's head under the other's chin, mannerisms that can be appreciated in Simba and Nala's encounter during the song "Can You Feel the Love Tonight". Fowler also talked about how they protect themselves by lying on their backs and using their claws to ward off attackers, and how they fight rivals by rising on their hind legs. Screenwriter Irene Mecchi joined the directing team to help in the character development process as well as to define each character's personality. Story head Brenda Chapman, gave insight to the challenge of the characters and the story by stating that "it was our job to make the main character likeable and sympathetic. It was also challenging to make the environment and characters interesting. In real life, lions basically sleep, eat and have no props."

Two spin-off television series have been produced, one focusing on the characters of Timon the meerkat and Pumbaa the warthog called The Lion King's Timon & Pumbaa, and the other focusing on new character Kion called The Lion Guard. Three sets of educational shorts have also been produced.

List indicators

This section includes characters who will appear or have appeared in the franchise.

- An empty grey cell indicates the character was not in the film, or that the character's official presence has not yet been confirmed.
- ^{A} indicates an appearance through archival footage or audio.
- ^{O} indicates an older version of the character.
- ^{Y} indicates a younger version of the character.
- ^{S} indicates an appearance as a character's singing voice.

Characters	Main films			Television series						Television film	Remake films	
Characters	The Lion King	The Lion King II: Simba's Pride	The Lion King 1½	The Lion King's Timon & Pumbaa			The Lion Guard			The Lion Guard: Return of the Roar	The Lion King	Mufasa: The Lion King
Characters	The Lion King	The Lion King II: Simba's Pride	The Lion King 1½	Season 1	Season 2	Season 3	Season 1	Season 2	Season 3	The Lion Guard: Return of the Roar	The Lion King	Mufasa: The Lion King
Simba	Matthew Broderick	Matthew Broderick	Matthew Broderick	Cam Clarke	Cam Clarke		Rob Lowe	Rob Lowe	Rob Lowe	Rob Lowe	Donald Glover	Donald Glover
Simba	Jonathan Taylor Thomas^{Y}	Cam Clarke^{S}	Matt Weinberg^{Y}	Cam Clarke	Cam Clarke		Rob Lowe	Rob Lowe	Rob Lowe	Rob Lowe	Donald Glover	Donald Glover
Simba	Jason Weaver^{Y}^{S}	Cam Clarke^{S}	Matt Weinberg^{Y}	Cam Clarke	Cam Clarke		Rob Lowe	Rob Lowe	Rob Lowe	Rob Lowe	Donald Glover	Donald Glover
Simba	Joseph Williams^{O}^{S}	Cam Clarke^{S}	Matt Weinberg^{Y}	Cam Clarke	Cam Clarke		Rob Lowe	Rob Lowe	Rob Lowe	Rob Lowe	JD McCrary^{Y}	Donald Glover
Simba	Evan Saucedo^{Y}^{S} (Note: Saucedo provided young Simba's singing voice in "The Morning Report", a newly animated song sequence that was added to the 2003 DVD Special Edition of The Lion King.)	Cam Clarke^{S}	Matt Weinberg^{Y}	Cam Clarke	Cam Clarke		Rob Lowe	Rob Lowe	Rob Lowe	Rob Lowe	JD McCrary^{Y}	Donald Glover
Timon	Nathan Lane	Nathan Lane	Nathan Lane	Nathan Lane	Kevin Schon	Kevin Schon	Kevin Schon	Kevin Schon	Kevin Schon	Kevin Schon	Billy Eichner	Billy Eichner
Timon	Nathan Lane	Nathan Lane	Nathan Lane	Quinton Flynn	Kevin Schon	Kevin Schon	Kevin Schon	Kevin Schon	Kevin Schon	Kevin Schon	Billy Eichner	Billy Eichner
Pumbaa	Ernie Sabella	Ernie Sabella	Ernie Sabella	Ernie Sabella	Ernie Sabella	Ernie Sabella	Ernie Sabella	Ernie Sabella	Ernie Sabella	Ernie Sabella	Seth Rogen	Seth Rogen
Nala	Moira Kelly	Moira Kelly	Moira Kelly				Gabrielle Union	Gabrielle Union	Gabrielle Union	Gabrielle Union	Beyoncé	Beyoncé
Nala	Niketa Calame^{Y}	Moira Kelly	Moira Kelly				Gabrielle Union	Gabrielle Union	Gabrielle Union	Gabrielle Union	Beyoncé	Beyoncé
Nala	Laura Williams^{Y}^{S}	Moira Kelly	Moira Kelly				Gabrielle Union	Gabrielle Union	Gabrielle Union	Gabrielle Union	Shahadi Wright Joseph^{Y}	Beyoncé
Nala	Sally Dworsky^{O}^{S}	Moira Kelly	Moira Kelly				Gabrielle Union	Gabrielle Union	Gabrielle Union	Gabrielle Union	Shahadi Wright Joseph^{Y}	Beyoncé
Rafiki	Robert Guillaume	Robert Guillaume	Robert Guillaume	Robert Guillaume	Robert Guillaume	Robert Guillaume	Khary Payton	Khary Payton	Khary Payton	Khary Payton	John Kani	John Kani
Rafiki	Robert Guillaume	Robert Guillaume	Robert Guillaume	Robert Guillaume	Robert Guillaume	Robert Guillaume	Khary Payton	Khary Payton	Khary Payton	Khary Payton	John Kani	Kagiso Lediga^{Y}
Zazu	Rowan Atkinson	Edward Hibbert	Edward Hibbert	Silent cameo	Edward Hibbert	Edward Hibbert	Jeff Bennett	Jeff Bennett	Jeff Bennett	Jeff Bennett	John Oliver	Preston Nyman
Zazu	Jeff Bennett^{S} (Note: Bennett provided the voice of Zazu in "The Morning Report", a newly animated song sequence that was added to the 2003 DVD Special Edition of The Lion King.)	Edward Hibbert	Edward Hibbert	Silent cameo	Edward Hibbert	Edward Hibbert	Jeff Bennett	Jeff Bennett	Jeff Bennett	Jeff Bennett	John Oliver	Preston Nyman
Mufasa	James Earl Jones	James Earl Jones	Silent role				Gary Anthony Williams	Gary Anthony Williams	Gary Anthony Williams	James Earl Jones	James Earl Jones	Aaron Pierre
Mufasa	James Earl Jones	James Earl Jones	Silent role				Gary Anthony Williams	Gary Anthony Williams	Gary Anthony Williams	James Earl Jones	James Earl Jones	Braelyn and Brielle Rankins^{Y}
Mufasa	James Earl Jones	James Earl Jones	Silent role				Gary Anthony Williams	Gary Anthony Williams	Gary Anthony Williams	James Earl Jones	James Earl Jones	James Earl Jones^{A}
Scar	Jeremy Irons	Jim Cummings	Silent role		Silent cameo		Silent cameo	David Oyelowo	David Oyelowo	Silent cameo	Chiwetel Ejiofor	Kelvin Harrison Jr. (Note: This incarnation of Scar is referred to as Taka before gaining his former name.)
Scar	Jim Cummings^{S}	Jim Cummings	Silent role		Silent cameo		Silent cameo	David Oyelowo	David Oyelowo	Silent cameo	Chiwetel Ejiofor	Theo Somolu^{Y}
Shenzi	Whoopi Goldberg		Whoopi Goldberg	Tress MacNeille	Tress MacNeille	Silent role					Florence Kasumba	
Banzai (Note: In the original animated version of The Lion King, the aggressive and serious member of Shenzi's clan is known as Banzai. In the 2019 remake, he is renamed to Kamari. Despite this, they are the same character.)	Cheech Marin		Cheech Marin	Rob Paulsen	Rob Paulsen	Silent role					Keegan-Michael Key	
Ed (Note: In the original animated version of The Lion King, the slow-minded member of Shenzi's clan is known as Ed. In the 2019 remake, he is renamed to Azizi. Despite this, they are the same character.)	Jim Cummings		Jim Cummings	Jim Cummings	Jim Cummings	Silent role					Eric André	
Sarabi	Madge Sinclair		Silent role					Silent cameo			Alfre Woodard	Tiffany Boone
Sarafina	Zoe Leader										Penny Johnson Jerald	Dominique Jennings
Gopher	Jim Cummings				Jim Cummings							
Kiara	Character is mute	Neve Campbell					Eden Riegel	Eden Riegel	Eden Riegel	Eden Riegel	Character is mute	Blue Ivy Carter
Kiara	Character is mute	Mary Gibbs^{Y}					Eden Riegel	Eden Riegel	Eden Riegel	Eden Riegel	Character is mute	Blue Ivy Carter
Kiara	Character is mute	Michelle Horn^{Y}					Eden Riegel	Eden Riegel	Eden Riegel	Eden Riegel	Character is mute	Blue Ivy Carter
Kiara	Character is mute	Charity Sanoy^{Y}^{S}					Eden Riegel	Eden Riegel	Eden Riegel	Eden Riegel	Character is mute	Blue Ivy Carter
Kiara	Character is mute	Liz Callaway^{O}^{S}					Eden Riegel	Eden Riegel	Eden Riegel	Eden Riegel	Character is mute	Blue Ivy Carter
Kiara	Character is mute	Ashley Edner^{Y}					Eden Riegel	Eden Riegel	Eden Riegel	Eden Riegel	Character is mute	Blue Ivy Carter
Kovu		Jason Marsden					Jason Marsden	Silent cameo	Jason Marsden			
Kovu		Ryan O'Donohue^{Y}					Jason Marsden	Silent cameo	Jason Marsden			
Kovu		Gene Miller^{O}^{S}					Jason Marsden	Silent cameo	Jason Marsden			
Zira		Suzanne Pleshette					Nika Futterman	Silent cameo	Silent cameo			
Nuka		Andy Dick					Andy Dick	Silent cameo				
Vitani		Jennifer Lien					Lacey Chabert	Silent cameo	Lacey Chabert			
Vitani		Lacey Chabert^{Y}					Lacey Chabert	Silent cameo	Lacey Chabert			
Vitani		Crysta Macalush^{Y}^{S}					Lacey Chabert	Silent cameo	Lacey Chabert			
Ma			Julie Kavner									
Uncle Max			Jerry Stiller									
Flinchy			Jason Rudofsky									
Quint				Corey Burton	Corey Burton	Corey Burton						
Speedy				Corey Burton	Corey Burton							
Fred				S. Scott Bullock	S. Scott Bullock							
Irwin				Charlie Adler	Charlie Adler							
Natives				Jeff Bennett	Jeff Bennett							
Cheetata				Rob Paulsen		Rob Paulsen						
Cheetato				Jim Cummings		Jim Cummings						
Boss Beaver					Brad Garrett							
Toucan Dan					Jeff Bennett							
Mr. Bear						Jim Cummings						
Little Jimmy						Joe Alaskey						
Kion							Max Charles	Max Charles	Max Charles	Max Charles		Character is mute
Kion							Max Charles	Max Charles	Aaron Daniel Jacob^{S}	Max Charles		Character is mute
Bunga							Joshua Rush	Joshua Rush	Joshua Rush	Joshua Rush		
Fuli							Diamond White	Diamond White	Diamond White	Diamond White		
Beshte							Dusan Brown	Dusan Brown	Dusan Brown	Dusan Brown		
Ono							Atticus Shaffer	Atticus Shaffer	Atticus Shaffer	Atticus Shaffer		
Janja							Andrew Kishino	Andrew Kishino	Andrew Kishino	Andrew Kishino		
Cheezi							Vargus Mason	Vargus Mason	Vargus Mason	Vargus Mason		
Chungu							Kevin Schon	Kevin Schon	Kevin Schon	Kevin Schon		
Mzingo							Greg Ellis	Greg Ellis	Greg Ellis	Greg Ellis		
Jasiri							Maia Mitchell	Maia Mitchell	Maia Mitchell			
Madoa							Maisie Klompus	Maisie Klompus	Maisie Klompus			
Makucha							Steve Blum	Steve Blum	Steve Blum			
Makini								Landry Bender	Landry Bender			
Anga								Bryana Salaz	Bryana Salaz			
Rani									Peyton Elizabeth Lee			
Rani									Lana McKissack^{S}			
Kiros												Mads Mikkelsen
Eshe												Thandiwe Newton
Obasi												Lennie James
Asigo												Keith David
Afia												Anika Noni Rose

== Development ==
=== History ===
Early production of The Lion King began in late 1988, with the film originally being titled King of the Kalahari and later King of the Jungle. The treatment, inspired by Hamlet, was written by Thomas M. Disch (author of The Brave Little Toaster) as work-for-hire; Disch received no credit or royalties. Production took place at the Walt Disney Animation Studios in Glendale, California. Also, nearly 20 minutes of the film were animated at the Disney-MGM Studios. Ultimately, more than 600 artists, animators and technicians contributed to The Lion King over its lengthy production schedule. More than one million drawings were created for the film, including 1,197 hand-painted backgrounds and 119,058 individually colored frames of film.

In October 1991, after finishing work on Beauty and the Beast as Head of Story, Roger Allers joined The Lion King, as the initial director. Allers worked for 6 months on story development and was then joined by co-director, Rob Minkoff. A 2-day story session was held to revamp the story with the two directors, Allers and Minkoff, joined by Gary Trousdale and Kirk Wise, directors of Beauty and the Beast, and Producer Don Hahn who presided over the discussion. The creative think-tank produced a character makeover for Simba and a radically revised second half of the film. Irene Mecchi joined the team that summer to help further develop the characters and define their personalities. Several months later, she was joined by Jonathan Roberts in the rewriting process. Working together in the animation department and in conjunction with the directors and story team, they tackled the unresolved emotional issues in the script and also added many comic situations. Some of the lead production crew made a trip to Africa to better understand the environment for the film. The trip gave production designer Chris Sanders a new appreciation for the natural environments and inspired him to find ways to incorporate these elements into the design of the film. The filmmakers also made use of computers to better present their vision in new ways. The most notable use of computer animation is in the "wildebeest stampede" sequence. Several distinct wildebeest characters were created in a 3D computer program, multiplied into hundreds, cel shaded to look like drawn animation, and given randomized paths down a mountainside to simulate the real, unpredictable movement of a herd. Similar multiplication occurs in the "Be Prepared" musical number with identical marching hyenas. Five specially trained animators and technicians spent more than two years creating the 2½ minute stampede sequence.

At one time, the Disney Feature Animation staff felt The Lion King was less important than Pocahontas. Both projects were in production at the same time, and most of the staff preferred to work on Pocahontas, believing it would be the more prestigious and successful of the two. As it turned out, while both films were commercial successes, The Lion King received more positive feedback and larger grosses than Pocahontas.

The sequel The Lion King II: Simba's Pride was directed by Darrell Rooney and produced by Jeannine Roussel, with Flip Kobler and Cindy Marcus writing the screenplay. Disney believed that Simba's Pride would be so popular that it shipped 15 million copies to stores for the October 27 release date.

=== Music ===
The original motion picture soundtrack for the first film was released by Walt Disney Records on June 13, 1994, two days before the film's release. It contains songs by songwriter Elton John and Tim Rice, who wrote five original songs, with Elton John performing "Can You Feel the Love Tonight" during the end credits. Additionally, "The Morning Report", a song which was not present in the original theatrical film, was later added to the IMAX theater and to the DVD Platinum Edition release. The film's score was composed by Hans Zimmer and supplemented with traditional African music and choir elements arranged by Lebo M. Elton John thought his career had hit a new low when he was writing the music to the song "Hakuna Matata". However, the strongly enthusiastic audience reception to an early film trailer which consisted solely of the opening sequence with the song "Circle of Life", suggested that the film would be very successful. Out of the five original songs, "Hakuna Matata" was listed at number 99 in the AFI's 100 Years...100 Songs list in 2004, and "Can You Feel the Love Tonight" won the Oscar for Best Original Song during the 67th Academy Awards. The soundtrack itself was the fourth best-selling album of 1994 on the Billboard 200 and the top-selling soundtrack.

Disney released Rhythm of the Pride Lands on February 28, 1995, as a sequel to the soundtrack of the first film. Rhythm of the Pride Lands was initially printed in a very limited quantity, but was later re-released in 2003, included in some international versions of The Lion King's special edition soundtrack with an additional track, "Circle of Life".

An audio CD entitled Return to Pride Rock: Songs Inspired by Disney's The Lion King II: Simba's Pride was released on September 8, 1998. Although not promoted as a soundtrack to The Lion King II: Simba's Pride, it contained all the songs from the film and some additional songs inspired by it by Lebo M. Tina Turner recorded a version of "He Lives in You" for the film. On August 31, 2004, Disney released an "enhanced soundtrack" to coincide with the release of the film's 2-Disc Special Edition DVD. However, the CD only contains the songs featured in the film, without any of the inspired songs by the first film. Siskel & Ebert noted that it was best the film was direct-to-video, since the music was lacking and not remotely equal to the original's soundtrack.

The soundtrack for the third film, The Lion King 1½: Songs From Timon and Pumbaa's Hilarious Adventure, was released to CD by Disney on February 10, 2004. It includes two songs from the original film, "That's All I Need" and "Hakuna Matata", re-performed by Nathan Lane who took over the role of voicing the character Timon. The rest of the soundtrack includes various R&B tracks, including remakes of the Kool and the Gang classic "Jungle Boogie" by artist French, and two instrumental pieces from film composer Don Harper. The soundtrack also includes Ennio Morricone's theme from "The Good, The Bad, and the Ugly".

== Reception ==
During its release in 1994, The Lion King was widely acclaimed, grossing more than $783 million worldwide, becoming the most successful film released that year. The film was the highest grossing animated film of all time until the release of Disney/Pixar's Finding Nemo. The Lion King is still the highest grossing traditionally animated film of all time in the United States. The film received many award nominations, and won the Academy Award for Best Original Score, the Golden Globe award for Best Motion Picture – Musical or Comedy, and the Annie Award for Best Animated Feature. The song "Can You Feel the Love Tonight" alone won the Academy Award for Best Original Song, the Golden Globe for Best Original Song, the BMI Film Music Award, and the Grammy Award for Best Vocal Performance Male.

On home video, The Lion King became the best-selling film on VHS, selling 32 million tapes, and grossing $520 million in video sales. The Lion King II: Simba's Pride sold 3.5 million copies in three days. Thirteen million copies were sold while it was still in print in the late 1990s. By 2000, it had sold 15 million VHS copies, and grossed about $300 million in sales and rentals. The Lion King 1½ sold 6 million DVD and VHS units in North America. The Lion King musical has grossed nearly $8.1 billion as of 2017, and is the highest-grossing musical of all time.

Both sequels won the Annie Award for Best Animated Home Entertainment Production. The Lion King 1½ also won five DVD Exclusive Awards. The musical won six Tony Awards including Best Musical.

=== Box office performance ===
Films	Release date	Box office			Budget	Reference
Films	Release date	US and Canada	Other territories	Worldwide	Budget	Reference
Traditionally Animated
The Lion King (1994)	June 15, 1994	$424,979,720	$553,942,764	$979,161,373	$45 million	
CGI Animated
The Lion King (2019)	July 19, 2019	$543,638,043	$1,118,382,776	$1,662,020,819	$250 million	
Mufasa: The Lion King	December 20, 2024	$254,567,693	$467,771,907	$722,339,600	$200 million	
Total		$1,223,185,456	$2,140,097,447	$3,363,521,792	$495 million	

=== Critical response ===
Films	Rotten Tomatoes	Metacritic	CinemaScore
The Lion King (1994)	92% (139 reviews)	88 (30 reviews)	A+
The Lion King II: Simba's Pride	67% (12 reviews)	—N/a	—N/a
The Lion King 1½	76% (17 reviews)	—N/a	—N/a
The Lion King (2019)	51% (435 reviews)	55 (54 reviews)	A
Mufasa: The Lion King	57% (214 reviews)	56 (51 reviews)	A-
