= Love Will Find a Way (Disney song) =

Song from Disney's 1998 animated film The Lion King II: Simba's Pride

Song by Liz Callaway and Gene Miller

from the album Return to Pride Rock
- Released: 1998
- Recorded: 1998
- Length: 3:00
- Label: Walt Disney
- Songwriters: Jack Feldman; Tom Snow

"Love Will Find a Way"

Single by Heather Headley and Kenny Lattimore

from the album Return to Pride Rock
- Released: July 6, 1998
- Recorded: 1998
- Genre: Pop, R&B
- Length: 4:30
- Label: Walt Disney
- Songwriters: Jack Feldman; Tom Snow

"Love Will Find a Way" is a song from the 1998 Disney film The Lion King II: Simba's Pride, written by Jack Feldman and Tom Snow. In the film, the song is sung by Liz Callaway and Gene Miller. In the end credits, a pop version is performed by Heather Headley and Kenny Lattimore. Both versions were featured on the album Return to Pride Rock: Songs Inspired by Disney's The Lion King II: Simba's Pride, while the pop version was also released as a single.

== Context ==
The song is sung by Kovu and Kiara, who, despite being from opposing lion prides, fall in love. Kovu has just been exiled from the Pride Lands after being falsely accused of attempting to assassinate Simba. They sing about how their love will conquer all opposition and ultimately bring them together again.

== Reception ==
The New York Times called it a "detachable...mawkish...generic-sounding ballad", and disliked the blight against Kiara's character of not being "brave and strong and smart" that is included in the song's lyrics. However, the newspaper added that the line does call to attention her "colorless, indistinct character", which lacks the cleverness of Belle and the will of Ariel. The Disney Song Encyclopedia describes it as a "romantic ballad" about how love can overcome all obstacles. Bustle compared the line "Somewhere in my secret heart, I know love will find a way" to the work of Pablo Neruda. Geeks Of Doom negatively compared the song to The Lion King's "Can You Feel the Love Tonight", but said the "overlooked" and "forgotten" song was a "touching" musical moment from the film about the "challenges of making relationships work" in the face of hurdles. AllMusic deemed the song a "favourite". Metro controversially deemed the tune Disney's 5th best song, positively comparing it to the "boring" and artificial "Can You Feel The Love Tonight" commenting that the "romantic" tune "tugs at the heartstrings in a much more meaningful way".

As of April 2017, the song is the 15th most streamed Disney song on Deezer, the second song on the list from The Lion King franchise after "Circle of Life".
