= Audience of One (album) =

Studio album by Heather Headley
- Released: January 13, 2009
- Recorded: 2007–2008
- Genre: Gospel
- Length: 49:16
- Label: EMI Gospel
- Producer: Ken Pennell (exec.); Keith Thomas

Heather Headley chronology
In My Mind (2006)	Audience of One (2009)	Only One in the World (2012)

Audience of One is the third studio album by the Trinidadian-American singer Heather Headley. It was released by the EMI Christian Music Group on January 13, 2009 in the United States, following Headley's transition from RCA Records. It is a collection of cover versions of popular gospel hymns as well as original songs, chiefly produced by Keith Thomas. It won a Grammy Award for Best Contemporary R&B Gospel Album at the 52nd Annual Grammy Awards. In addition, Audience of One was nominated for a Dove Award for Contemporary Gospel Album of the Year at the 41st GMA Dove Awards.

== Critical reception ==
Professional ratings
Review scores
Source	Rating
The Boston Globe	favorable
Metro Spirit	mixed
USA Today	3/4 stars
The Washington Post	favorable

Upon its release, Audience of One received generally positive reviews from most music critics. The Boston Globe writer Ken Capobianco saw it as an improvement from Headley's previous work and praised her singing, calling her vocal performances "commanding" and her voice "the purest and boldest voice in pop". The Washington Post's Sarah Godfrey wrote favorably of Headley's performance on the album and stated, "Audience of One lifts its voice to the heavens." However, Metro Spirit writer Frazia Lee viewed it as "redundant with slow-paced songs", but commended Headley for her intent with gospel themes. Elysa Gardner of USA Today commended Headley for her vocals and wrote that the album's pop-oriented songs are "saved by Headley's discipline and grace, which not only pleases the ear but also reinforces the sense of humility so central to these songs".

== Chart performance ==
The album debuted at number 27 on the U.S. Billboard 200 chart in January 2009. It marked Headley's lowest opening for a studio album up to then and was a considerable decline from her previous effort In My Mind (2006). It also reached number one on Billboard's Top Gospel Albums and at number six on the Top R&B/Hip-Hop Albums chart.

== Track listing ==
All tracks are produced by Keith Thomas.

No.	Title	Writer(s)	Length
1.	"Simply Redeemed"	Tommy Sims; Marc Harris	5:07
2.	"Ordinary Me"	Heather Headley; Will Champlin; Jonathan Crone; Liz Rose	4:29
3.	"I Wish"	H. Headley; Iric Headley, Jr.; Thomas	4:00
4.	"Jesus Is Love" (featuring Smokie Norful)	Lionel Richie	5:41
5.	"I Need Thee Every Hour"/"Tis So Sweet to Trust in Jesus"/"I'd Rather Have Jesus"	Annie Hawks; Robert Lowry; Louisa Stead; William J. Kirkpatrick; Rhea Miller; George Beverly Shea	4:51
6.	"Running Back to You"	Fred Hammond	5:31
7.	"I Know the Lord Will Make a Way"	Traditional	4:46
8.	"Here I Am to Worship"	Tim Hughes	4:43
9.	"The Power of the Cross"	Keith Getty; Stuart Townend	6:30
10.	"Zion"	H. Headley; Thomas	3:38

== Personnel ==
Credits for Audience of One adapted from Allmusic.

Instruments and performances

- Darryl "DJ" Abernathy – drums
- Nico Abondolo – bass
- Steve Becknell – French horn
- Garrett Body – bass
- Becky Bunnell – violin
- Jorge Calandrelli – conductor, orchestration
- Darius Campo – violin
- Roberto Cani – violin
- Marion Caselberry – chorus
- Larry Corbett – cello
- Jonathan Crone – electric guitar
- David Davidson – violin
- Anthony Davis – chorus
- Brian Dembow – viola
- Drew Dembowski – bass
- Marcia Dickstein – harp
- Johnny Dillard – bass
- Bruce Dukov – violin, concert master
- Annette Dunlap – chorus
- Stephen Erdody – cello
- Alma Fernandez – viola
- Shannon Forrest – drums
- Tiffany Gatlin – chorus
- Sheldon Goodson – chorus
- Tim Gordon – saxophone
- Dan Greco – percussion
- Justin Hageman – French horn
- David Hamilton – piano, orchestration
- Heather Headley – arranger, vocals
- Terry Holmes – chorus
- Lenair Hunt – chorus
- Tyrone Jefferson – trombone, horn arrangements
- Lawrence Jones – electric guitar
- Roland Kato – viola
- Sherrie Kibble – chorus
- Paul Klintworth – French horn
- Miran Kojian – violin
- Johana Krejci – violin
- Armen Ksadjikian – cello
- Cindy Larson – chorus
- Tanika Leigh – chorus
- Phillipe Levy – violin
- Olivia Mack – chorus
- Liane Mautner – violin
- Tracey McGhee – chorus
- Jerry McPherson – electric guitar
- Tamika Newsome – chorus
- Adam Nitti – bass
- Ira Noise – organ
- Carmel Nunnally – chorus
- Risha Nunnally – chorus
- Robin Olson – violin
- Jadon Poindexter – chorus
- Katia Popov – violin
- Michael Ripoll – acoustic guitar
- Anatoly Rosinsky – violin
- Denise Rutledge – chorus
- Harry Shirinian – viola
- Carol Smith – chorus
- Gene Smith – chorus
- Audrey Solomon – violin
- Tina Soule – cello
- Tracey Taylor – chorus
- Keith Thomas – piano, arranger, Fender Rhodes, string arrangements
- Cedric Thompson – drums, keyboards
- Rick Todd – French horn
- Irina Voloshina – violin
- Dave Walther – viola
- Rick Watford – guitar
- Margaret Wooten – violin
- Kimmie Young – chorus
- Nathan Young – arranger, chorus master
- Suzanne Young – chorus

Technical and production

- James Auwarter – engineer
- Darryl Bush – production coordination
- Rob Clark – assistant engineer
- Jonathan Crone – engineer, production coordination
- Ken Love – mastering
- Josh Miller – engineer
- Smokie Norful – arranger
- Ken Pennell – executive producer
- Bill Airey Smith – engineer
- Paul "Scooby" Smith – digital editing
- Glenn A. Tabor III – mixing
- Keith Thomas – programming, producer
- Cedric Thompson – engineer
- Scott Velazco – assistant engineer
- Matthew Westerholm – arranger
- Bill Whittington – engineer, mixing
- Thomas Wright – engineer, assistant engineer

== Charts ==
=== Weekly charts ===
Chart (2006)	Peak position
US Billboard 200	27
US Top Gospel Albums (Billboard)	1
US Top R&B/Hip-Hop Albums (Billboard)	6

=== Year-end charts ===
Chart (2009)	Position
US Top Gospel Albums (Billboard)	8
US Top R&B/Hip-Hop Albums (Billboard)	84
