= The Lion King 1½ (video game) =

2003 video game

- Developer: Vicarious Visions
- Publishers: NA: Disney Interactive; PAL: THQ
- Series: The Lion King
- Platform: Game Boy Advance
- Release: WW: October 7, 2003
- Genre: Platform
- Mode: Single-player

Disney's The Lion King 1½ (known as Disney's The Lion King outside North America) is a 2003 platform game based on the 2004 animated film of the same name. It was developed by Vicarious Visions and published by Disney Interactive, whilst THQ distributed the game in Europe. The game was released worldwide for Game Boy Advance on October 7, 2003 (the same day the original film came to DVD for the first time), 4 months before the film came out.

== Gameplay ==
The game puts the players in the role of Timon and Pumbaa in a quest to find Hakuna Matata. It features three modes of gameplay which are Solo, Cooperative and Team mode. Solo mode lets the player play only as either Timon or Pumbaa in a platforming gameplay completing levels. In Cooperative mode, players alternate between both characters to solve puzzles and complete tasks. In Team mode, players use both characters with Timon riding Pumbaa in chase sequences where they have to make sure they do not hit any obstacles.

Upon completing a set of levels, a video clip from the film is unlocked. After the player collects all 40 grubs in a level, they are awarded with special puzzle pieces. Collecting all puzzle pieces for a set of levels unlocks a time-limited bonus level, where Timon or Pumbaa must get to the end to collect an additional health point, as well as clocks to get more time in the level. There are also hidden power-ups, such as a remote that stops enemies from moving, a drink that defeats all enemies on screen, and a beetle that gives Timon or Pumbaa an extra health point. Two hidden upgrades each for Timon and Pumbaa can be found: a hat & cane and hula outfit for Timon that stuns hyenas longer, and stink bugs for Pumbaa that let him attack more frequently.

== Release ==
On October 2, 2003, screenshots of the game were released showing that it had gameplay similar to that of the video game The Lost Vikings. The game was released on October 7, 2003, a few months before the film's release during the first ever DVD release of the original film.

== Critical reception ==
Reception

Aggregate scores
Aggregator	Score
GameRankings	62.87%
Metacritic	64/100

Review scores
Publication	Score
GameZone	8.8/10
Nintendo Power	2.7/5
Nintendojo	6.5/10

On Metacritic, the game has a score of 64/100 based on 4 reviews and an aggregate score of 62.87% on GameRankings based on 6 reviews.

GameZone gave it a review score of 8.8/10 saying "Teamwork and well-balanced gameplay put kids at the controls of another enjoyable Disney romp". Nintendojo gave the game a review score of 6.5/10 saying "The Lion King 1.5 isn't a bad game. I actually thought it was a lot of fun. It is well-animated and entertaining, but it was just unforgivably easy". Nintendo Power gave it a review score of 2.7/5 saying "Intuitive play control and simple level design make the game appropriate for players of all skill levels".
