= We Are One (Disney song) =

Single by Tom Snow, Marty Panzer, Jack Feldman
- Released: 1998
- Genre: Earth
- Songwriters: Marty Panzer, Thomas Snow, and Jack Feldman

"We Are One" is a song in Disney's 1998 direct-to-video film, The Lion King II: Simba's Pride.

== Production ==
The song was written and composed by Marty Panzer, Thomas Snow, and Jack Feldman. It is sung by both Simba (Cam Clarke) and Kiara (Charity Sanoy), and was later performed by the five time Grammy Award winner Angelique Kidjo on the album Return to Pride Rock; this version is half English and half Fon.

== Context ==
Within the context of the film, the song is used to explain how the Circle of Life works in a way that Kiara (and children in the audience) would understand. It starts by explaining how life is hard to understand and ends by explaining how life works. This song also resembles the part of the first film when Mufasa tells Simba about the "Great Kings of the Past".

Later in the film, when Kiara and Kovu's love are causing tensions to rise between the two prides, Kiara tells her father: "A wise king once told me "We are one". I didn't understand him then... Now I do ... Them? Us! Look at them! They are us! What differences do you see?". This teaches children the film's underlying message that "love and acceptance know no boundaries", rendering We Are One to be the film's main musical motif that carries the piece.

== Reception ==
The New York Times writer Caryn James thought the "subtle and graceful" tune was "attuned to the film's hopeful theme of regeneration". Despite believing that The Lion King II not having the same "impact" or "pizazz" as its predecessor, Black Family Today thought Kidjo's version of this song was strong enough to last beyond the context of the film it was written for. Drum: A Magazine of Africa for Africa felt Kidgo's rendition is "the song to watch" form the film's soundtrack.

The song was nominated for an Annie Award for Outstanding Individual Achievement for Music in an Animated Feature Production along with "My Lullaby".
