= Return to Pride Rock =

1998 soundtrack album

Soundtrack album (Audio CD/Digital download) by Various artists
- Released: September 29, 1998
- Genres: Soundtrack; pop; world
- Length: 41:21
- Label: Walt Disney
- Producers: Harold J. Kleiner; Jean Hébrail; Lebo M

Professional ratings
Review scores
Source	Rating
AllMusic	3/5 stars

Return to Pride Rock: Songs Inspired by Disney's The Lion King II: Simba's Pride is a 1998 studio album released as an accompaniment to the animated film The Lion King II: Simba's Pride. Although not promoted as an official soundtrack, it contains all the songs from the film, as well as additional songs by Lebo M. Other featured artists included Liz Callaway, Nick Glennie-Smith, Robert Guillaume, Ladysmith Black Mambazo, and Suzanne Pleshette. On August 31, 2004, Disney released an "enhanced soundtrack" to coincide with the release of the film's 2-disc Special Edition DVD. However, the CD only contains the songs featured in the film, without any of the "inspired" songs from Return to Pride Rock.

== Track listing ==
No.	Title	Writer(s)	Performer(s)	Length
1.	"He Lives In You (From "Rhythm of the Pride Lands")"	Lebo M, Mark Mancina, Jay Rifkin	Lebo M	3:07
2.	"We Are One (From "Simba's Pride")"	Jack Feldman, Marty Panzer, Tom Snow	Cam Clarke, Charity Sanoy, Ladysmith Black Mambazo	3:45
3.	"Upendi (From "The Lion King II: Simba's Pride"/Soundtrack Version)"	Randy Petersen, Kevin Quinn	Liz Callaway, Gene Miller, Robert Guillaume, Ladysmith Black Mambazo	2:54
4.	"One of Us (From "The Lion King II: Simba's Pride"/Soundtrack Version)"	Jack Feldman, Tom Snow	Chorus – The Lion King 2: Simba's Pride	2:40
5.	"My Lullaby"	Scott Warrender, Joss Whedon	Suzanne Pleshette, Crysta Macalush, Andy Dick, Chorus	2:54
6.	"Love Will Find a Way (From "Simba's Pride")"	Jack Feldman, Tom Snow	Liz Callaway, Gene Miller, Disney Studios Chorus	3:00
7.	"We Are One"	Jack Feldman, Marty Panzer, Tom Snow	Angélique Kidjo	4:10
8.	"She Believes in You"	Lebo M.	Lebo M.	4:23
9.	"Song for the Children"	Lebo M.	Lebo M.	2:28
10.	"I Want to See the Moon"	Lebo M	Lebo M.	4:14
11.	"The Lion Sleeps Tonight (Full Version)"	Solomon Linda, Hugo Peretti, Luigi Creatore, George David Weiss, Albert Stanton	Lebo M.	3:33
12.	"Love Will Find a Way (End Title)"	Jack Feldman, Tom Snow	Heather Headley, Kenny Lattimore	4:28
Total length:				41:36

== Charts ==
Return to Pride Rock appeared on the Top Kid Audio and World Albums charts published by Billboard.
