= The Lion King II: Simba's Pride =

1998 American direct-to-video animated film

- Home video release poster
- Directed by: Darrell Rooney
- Screenplay by: Flip Kobler; Cindy Marcus
- Produced by: Jeannine Roussel
- Starring: Matthew Broderick; Neve Campbell; Andy Dick; Robert Guillaume; James Earl Jones; Moira Kelly; Nathan Lane; Jason Marsden; Suzanne Pleshette; Ernie Sabella
- Edited by: Peter Lonsdale
- Music by: Nick Glennie-Smith
- Production company: Walt Disney Television Animation (Note: Animation outsourced to Walt Disney Animation Australia and Walt Disney Animation Canada.)
- Distributed by: Buena Vista Home Entertainment (Note: Distributed under the Walt Disney Home Video imprint.)
- Release date: October 27, 1998
- Running time: 80 minutes
- Country: United States
- Language: English

The Lion King II: Simba's Pride (also titled as The Lion King 2: Simba's Pride) (Note: Also titled as The Lion King 2: Simba's Kingdom in some countries.) is a 1998 American animated direct-to-video musical drama film produced by Walt Disney Video Premiere. Directed by Darrell Rooney, it is the sequel to Disney Animation's 1994 film, The Lion King, with its plot influenced by William Shakespeare's Romeo and Juliet, and the second installment in The Lion King trilogy.

Animated by Walt Disney Animation Australia, the film centers on Simba and Nala's daughter Kiara, who falls in love with Kovu, a lion from an exiled pride once loyal to Scar. Separated by Simba's prejudice against the pride and a vindictive plot planned by Kovu's mother Zira, Kiara and Kovu struggle to unite their estranged prides and be together.

Most of the original cast returned to their roles from the first film with a few exceptions. Rowan Atkinson, who voiced Zazu in the first film, was replaced by Edward Hibbert for both this film and The Lion King 1½ (2004). Jeremy Irons, who voiced Scar in the first film, was replaced by Jim Cummings, who briefly provided his singing voice in the first film. The Lion King II: Simba's Pride was released by Buena Vista Home Entertainment on October 27, 1998. While not drawing the same attention as its predecessor, Simba's Pride received generally positive reviews from critics and audiences.

== Plot ==
King Simba and Queen Nala's newborn daughter Kiara is presented to the gathered animals of the Pride Lands. (Note: As depicted in The Lion King (1994).) After Kiara has grown into a young cub, she becomes frustrated with her father's parenting, so Simba has his childhood friends Timon and Pumbaa accompany her out of concern for her safety. Over Simba's protestations, Kiara wanders off alone into the barren Outlands—the home of an exiled pride who followed Simba's uncle Scar known as the Outsiders—and encounters another cub, Kovu.

After narrowly escaping a crocodile-infested river, the cubs befriend each other. When Simba comes across Kovu and Kiara playing, he misinterprets it as fighting and confronts Kovu just as he is confronted by Zira, Kovu's mother and the Outsiders' leader. Simba later explains to Kiara the responsibilities of queenship and that everyone is a part of each other. Zira, who is secretly training Kovu as an assassin, realizes she can use her son's friendship with Kiara to kill Simba and usurp the throne. Meanwhile, the spirit of Simba's late father, Mufasa, plans to bring Kiara and Kovu together to reunite the Pridelanders and the Outsiders.

Years later, an adolescent Kovu rescues Kiara after his older siblings Nuka and Vitani start a wildfire during her first solo hunt. Alerted to Kiara's location, Simba accepts Kovu's offer to join the Pridelanders, though he remains suspicious of his motives. Later, while training Kiara in hunting, Kovu begins reconsidering his mission to kill Simba and tells Kiara he is not Scar's actual son. Simba's friend and advisor, Rafiki, leads the lions to the jungle and helps them fall in love by introducing them to the concept of upendi. At Nala's persuasion, Simba has Kovu spend the night inside Pride Rock with the rest of the Pridelanders. Vitani, however, secretly sends word back to Zira about Kovu's failure to kill Simba.

The next morning, Simba shows Kovu the Pride Lands and tells him the truth about Scar. The Outsiders ambush Simba and trick him into thinking Kovu has betrayed him. In the ensuing battle, Nuka is killed and Simba escapes, but injured. When Zira angrily blames Kovu for Nuka's death and slashes across his eye, leaving a scar, Kovu turns on her and pleads Simba for forgiveness but is instead exiled. Distraught and heartbroken, Kiara gets into an argument with her father, making him realize his irrational behavior, saying that he will never be Mufasa, which horrifies Simba, and runs away from Pride Rock to search for Kovu herself.

After reuniting, Kiara and Kovu return to the Pride Lands and successfully convince the Pridelanders and Outsiders to stop fighting. However, an enraged Zira tries attacking Simba, but instead, Kiara pushes her out in the way and Zira falls off a nearby cliff in a river to her death.

Following the battle, Simba welcomes the rest of the Outsiders, including Kovu, back into the Pride Lands, thus finally reuniting them with the Pridelanders. During a later celebration on Pride Rock, Simba witnesses Mufasa's spirit congratulating him.

== Voice cast ==
- Neve Campbell as Kiara, the daughter of Simba and Nala, heir to the Pride Lands and Kovu's love interest and later mate. Liz Callaway provided Kiara's singing voice.
  - Michelle Horn voiced young Kiara while Charity Sanoy provided the cub's singing voice.
    - Mary Gibbs as Baby Kiara
- Jason Marsden as Kovu, the son of Zira, Scar's successor, Nuka and Vitani's younger brother, and Kiara's love interest and later mate. Gene Miller provided Kovu's singing voice.
  - Ryan O'Donohue provided the voice of young Kovu.
- Suzanne Pleshette as Zira, the leader of the Outsiders, Scar's most loyal follower and the mother of Nuka, Vitani and Kovu. Kathleen Turner had originally been cast as Zira, but was replaced for undisclosed reasons. During an interview on The Rosie O'Donnell Show in March 1998, Turner talked about the role and sang a portion of her character's song (stating the film would be her singing debut).
- Matthew Broderick as Simba, King of the Pride Lands, Mufasa and Sarabi's son, Scar's nephew, Nala's mate, and Kiara's father. Cam Clarke provided Simba's singing voice.
- Nathan Lane as Timon, a wise-cracking meerkat who befriended Simba when he was a cub.
- Ernie Sabella as Pumbaa, a naïve warthog who befriended Simba when he was a cub.
- Robert Guillaume as Rafiki, a wise mandrill who serves as the shaman of the Pride Lands.
- Andy Dick as Nuka, the eldest child of Zira and the older brother of Vitani and Kovu.
- Moira Kelly as Nala, Queen of the Pride Lands, Simba's mate, and Kiara's mother.
- Meredith Scott Lynn as Vitani, the daughter and middle child of Zira, the older sister of Kovu, and the younger sister of Nuka.
  - Lacey Chabert voiced young Vitani while Crysta Macalush provided the cub's singing voice.
- Edward Hibbert as Zazu, an uptight hornbill who serves as the majordomo to the King of the Pride Lands. Hibbert succeeds Rowan Atkinson as Zazu's voice actor from the first film.
- James Earl Jones as Mufasa, Simba's late father, Kiara's grandfather, Nala's father-in-law, Scar's brother, and the previous King of the Pride Lands.
- Jim Cummings as Scar, Mufasa's younger brother, Simba's uncle, and Kiara's great-uncle who appears in a brief cameo.

== Production ==
In May 1994, discussion had begun about the possibility of a direct-to-video sequel to The Lion King before the first film had been released in theaters. In January 1995, it was reported that a Lion King sequel would be released "in the next twelve months". However, it was delayed, and then it was reported in May 1996 that it would be released in early 1997. By 1996, Darrell Rooney had signed on to direct the film while Jeannine Roussel would serve as producer.

In April 1996, Jane Leeves of Frasier fame had been cast as Binti, who was to be Zazu's girlfriend, but the character was ultimately dropped. In August 1996, Cheech Marin reported that he would reprise his role as Banzai the hyena from the first film, but the character was ultimately cut from the sequel. In December 1996, Matthew Broderick was confirmed to be returning as Simba while his wife, Sarah Jessica Parker, and Jennifer Aniston were in talks to voice Aisha, Simba's daughter. Andy Dick had also signed on to voice Nuka, which was mistakenly reported as "Nunka". The character Aisha was renamed Kiara (after it was discovered that Aisha was the name of a female Power Ranger), and voiced by Neve Campbell, from the Scream film series. Kovu was voiced by Jason Marsden, who had voiced Max in A Goofy Movie (1995). During production, Kovu had been intended to be Scar's son, thus he would have been Kiara's first cousin once removed. According to Variety, the plot element of Scar's son romancing Simba's daughter "had been a topic of heated discussion between top Disney [executives]."

According to Rooney, the final draft gradually became a variation of Romeo and Juliet. "It's the biggest love story we have," he explained. "The difference is that you understand the position of the parents in this film in a way you never did in the Shakespeare play." Because none of the original animators were involved in the production, the majority of the animation was done by Walt Disney Television Animation's studio in Sydney, Australia. However, all storyboarding and pre-production work was done at the Feature Animation studio in Burbank, California. The additional animation was by Disney's Canadian animation studio and Toon City in Manila, Philippines. By March 1998, Disney confirmed the sequel would be released on October 27, 1998.

== Release ==
Coincided with its direct-to-video release, Simba's Pride was accompanied with a promotional campaign, which included tie-ins with McDonald's, Mattel, and Lever 2000. Unlike the North American release, Simba's Pride was theatrically released in European and Latin American countries in spring 1999.

On October 21, 1998, Simba's Pride premiered at the Wadsworth Theatre, with the filmmakers, voice cast, and multiple celebrities, some of whom attended with their children present in an African-themed party bash. The film was first released on VHS in the United States and Canada on October 27, 1998, and on DVD as a limited issue on November 23, 1999. The DVD release featured the film in a letterboxed 1.66:1 aspect ratio, the trailer for the movie, and a music video of "Love Will Find a Way" performed by Heather Headley and Kenny Lattimore. In 1998, Disney believed that The Lion King II: Simba's Pride would be so popular that it shipped 13 million copies to stores for the October 27 release date. For its first week of release, the film reached the top of the sales chart, beating out Hope Floats, Gone with the Wind, and Cats. In March 2001, it was reported that in its first three days, 3.5 million VHS copies were sold, and ultimately about thirteen million copies were sold. In September 2001, it was reported that Simba's Pride had sold more than 15 million copies. Overall, consumer spending on The Lion King II: Simba's Pride accumulated about $300 million — roughly the same figure of its predecessor's theatrical release at that time. By 2005, it still remained as one of the top-selling direct-to-video releases of all time, with $464.5 million worldwide in sales and rentals.

On August 31, 2004, the film was re-released on VHS and a 2-Disc Special Edition DVD. The DVD edition featured optional pop-up informational commentary, several interactive games (including Timon and Pumbaa's Virtual Safari 2.0), five humorous "Find Out Why" shorts, an animated short based on Lebo M's "One by One", and a "Proud of Simba's Pride" featurette. The Special Edition version featured changes made to the film such as one of Kovu's reactions being re-animated as well as other alterations. A DVD boxed set of the three The Lion King films (in two-disc Special Edition formats) was released on December 6, 2004. In January 2005, the film, along with the sequels, went back into moratorium.

On October 4, 2011, Simba's Pride was included in an eight-disc box set trilogy set with the other two films. The Blu-ray edition for the film was released as a separate version on March 6, 2012. The Blu-ray edition has three different versions, a 2-disc Blu-ray/DVD combo pack, a 1-disc edition, and a digital download. The Blu-ray edition has also been attached with a new Timon & Pumbaa short, in which the two friends gaze at the night sky as the star constellations resemble their favorite meal, insects.

The film was re-released by Walt Disney Studios Home Entertainment on a Blu-ray combo pack and digital release along with The Lion King 1½ on August 29, 2017 — the same day as the first film's Signature Edition was released.

== Reception ==
The review aggregation website Rotten Tomatoes reports that the film has an approval rating of 67% based on 12 reviews with an average rating of 6.1/10.

Siskel & Ebert gave the film a "two-thumbs up" and said it was a "satisfactory sequel to one of the most popular films of all time, The Lion King". However, they also said it was best that it went to video, citing that the music was lacking and not remotely equal to the original's soundtrack. TV Guide gave the film 2 1/2 stars out of four, claiming that, despite being of slightly higher quality than Disney's previous direct-to-video animated sequels, "comes nowhere near the level of its big-screen predecessor", either musically or artistically. The review later states: "Though most of the original characters and their voices are back, they all sound bored, apart from the zesty addition of Suzanne Pleshette as the scheming Zira. The overall result is OK for kids, who will enjoy the low humor provided by the comical meerkat Timon and the flatulent warthog Pumbaa, but it could have been so much better."

Writing for Variety, Joe Leydon commented in his review: "In marked contrast to most of the studio's small screen sequels to bigscreen animated hits, the new pic isn't merely kids' stuff. Not unlike its predecessor, Lion King II has enough across-the-board appeal to entertain viewers of all ages." Caryn James of The New York Times concluded her review: "It's the rare sequel that matches the creative flair of an original, of course. The Lion King II may be derivative, but it is also winning on its own." The parental website Screen It rated the movie 7 out of 10, claiming "...while it doesn't have the mighty roar of its predecessor, The Lion King II: Simba's Pride is clearly one of the better straight to video releases ever to come out of Hollywood. Although the animation isn't quite up to par with the original, the new songs don't have that special touch that made them and The Lion King such a success, and the fact that the film suffers somewhat from a heavy dose of familiarity, this is still a pretty decent picture."

Entertainment Weekly critic Stephen Witty, who graded the sequel a C+, wrote, "Despite its drawbacks, The Lion King II could make a decent rental for undemanding under-7 fans of the original, who won't be overburdened by the psychodrama. For true believers who've already watched and rewound their copies to shreds, it might even make a good buy. And for them, hey, hakuna matata. But for the rest of us, caveat emptor might be a better motto." James Plath of Movie Metropolis gave the film 6/10, saying that, "Simply put, we've seen it all before." Felix Vasquez Jr. of Cinema Crazed derided, "the sequel is as predictable a sequel as can be. It takes from The Fox and the Hound with shades of Romeo and Juliet and side steps the interesting Simba in favor of his bland daughter Kiara, and Timon and Pumba [sic]."

== Music ==
=== Songs ===
No.	Title	Writer(s)	Performer(s)	Length
1.	"He Lives in You"	Mark Mancina, Jay Rifkin, Lebo M	Lebo M, Chorus
2.	"We Are One"	Marty Panzer, Jack Feldman & Tom Snow	Cam Clarke, Charity Sanoy
3.	"My Lullaby"	Joss Whedon, Scott Warrender	Suzanne Pleshette, Andy Dick, Crysta Macalush
4.	"Upendi"	Kevin Quinn, Randy Petersen	Robert Guillaume, Liz Callaway, Gene Miller, Ladysmith Black Mambazo
5.	"One of Us"	Feldman, Snow	Chorus
6.	"Love Will Find a Way"	Feldman, Snow	Callaway, Miller
7.	"He Lives in You (Reprise)"	Mancina, Rifkin, Lebo M	Tina Turner
8.	"Upendi (Reprise)"	Quinn, Petersen	Wes Madiko
9.	"Love Will Find a Way (End Title)"	Feldman, Snow	Kenny Lattimore, Heather Headley

=== Soundtrack ===
A CD titled Return to Pride Rock: Songs Inspired by Disney's The Lion King II: Simba's Pride was released on September 29, 1998. Although not promoted as a soundtrack to the film, it contained all the songs from the film and some additional songs inspired by it by Lebo M such as an abridged version of his song "He Lives in You".

== Legacy ==
=== Video games ===
Along with the film's release, three different video games based on Simba's Pride was released by Disney Interactive. An educational video game titled Disney's Active Play: The Lion King II: Simba's Pride was released on Windows 95, Windows 98, and Windows Me on October 27, 1998. Another video game titled The Lion King II: Simba's Pride: GameBreak was released on Windows 95, as well as Disney's Hot Shots: Cub Chase which featured the cub versions of Kiara and Kovu. Characters from Simba's Pride were later featured in Torus Games' The Lion King: Simba's Mighty Adventure (2000) for the Game Boy Color and PlayStation.

=== The Lion Guard ===
In January 2016, Disney began airing a television series titled The Lion Guard on Disney Junior, following a television pilot film The Lion Guard: Return of the Roar in November 2015. The majority of the series takes place during the years in-between Kiara's first meeting with Kovu as a cub and her first hunt as a young adult. It focuses on Kiara's younger brother Kion who as second-born, becomes leader of The Lion Guard, a group who protect the Pride Lands and defend the Circle of Life.

Kovu, Vitani, Nuka, and Zira appear in the season 1 episode "Lions of the Outlands". Additionally, Kovu and Vitani make an appearance in the season 3 and series finale episode "Return to the Pride Lands", which takes place after the events of Simba's Pride. Jason Marsden, Lacey Chabert and Andy Dick reprised their roles from the film, while Suzanne Pleshette, who died in 2008, was replaced by Nika Futterman. At the end of the season 3 premiere, "Battle for the Pride Lands", the Lion Guard leave the Pride Lands and go to the Far East in search of the Tree of Life for help, after Kion and another guard member are injured while defeating Scar's spirit. This explains Kion's absence from Simba's Pride.

=== Mufasa: The Lion King ===
In the 2024 film Mufasa: The Lion King, the prequel/sequel to the 2019 photorealistic adaptation, Kiara appears as a major character that listens to the story of Mufasa and Scar, told by Rafiki. At the end of the film, Kiara's new brother is born.
