= Only One in the World =

Studio album by Heather Headley
- Released: September 25, 2012
- Studio: Willowbrooke Studios and Sound Kitchen (Franklin, Tennessee); Ocean Way Recording and Little Big Sound (Nashville, Tennessee); Hinge Studios (Chicago, Illinois); Capitol Studios (Hollywood, California)
- Genre: R&B
- Length: 51:00
- Label: in:ciite
- Producer: Heather Headley (exec.); Brian Musso (exec.); Chris Thomason (exec.); Iric Headley, Jr.; Paul Mills; Keith Thomas

Heather Headley chronology
Audience of One (2009)	Only One in the World (2012)	Broadway My Way (2018)

Only One in the World is the fourth studio album by Trinidadian-American singer-songwriter Heather Headley. It was released by in:ciite Media on September 25, 2012, just before Headley's West End debut as character Rachel Marron in the musical The Bodyguard. It is a collection of original songs and a number of cover versions of pop songs, showtunes and R&B songs.

== Critical reception ==
Professional ratings
Review scores
Source	Rating
Allmusic	2.5/5 stars
Cross Rhythms	9/10 stars
The Huffington Post	mixed
GMC TV	favorable

Stella Redburn from Cross Rhythms found that "once again Heather demonstrates that she is a class act [...] The production by Paul Mills and Keith Thomas is of the highest quality with a deft blend of MOR, R&B and more theatrical moments. Six of the 12 songs are Heather's own and reflect some of the ups and downs of life." In his review for Allmusic, Andy Kellman remarked that "perhaps it's Headley's work on the stage that has impacted her approach. It's more impressive than it is enjoyable. The performances are not lacking, but they have a grand, larger-than-life quality that somehow sacrifices relatability." He rated the album two and a half stars out of five. Associated Press journalist Nekesa Moody wrote that "Headley loses [her] thrill on fourth album [...] She doesn't put her stamp on any of them and leaves the listener wistfully thinking of the songs' original performers [...] While Headley does have original material, most of it isn't as strong or compelling as her R&B hits "I Wish I Wasn't" and "In My Mind." [...] There's no wonderment here."

== Track listing ==
No.	Title	Writer(s)	Producer(s)	Length
1.	"Only One in the World"	Heather Headley; Robin Scoffield; Keith Thomas	Thomas	4:03
2.	"The Reason"	Robb Douglas; Daniel Estrin; Chris Hesse; Markku Lappalainen	Thomas	3:52
3.	"Because You Need Me" (featuring Chris Mann)	H. Headley; Mann; Liz Rose; Thomas	Thomas	4:14
4.	"Bring Him Back"	H. Headley; Thomas	Thomas	4:46
5.	"Run to You"	Joseph Friedman; Dennis Rich	Thomas	4:28
6.	"A Little While"	H. Headley; Thomas	Thomas	4:23
7.	"River Deep, Mountain High"	Jeff Barry; Ellie Greenwich; Phil Spector	Paul Mills	4:44
8.	"One Last Cry"	Melanie Barnes; Michael Barnes; Brian McKnight	Mills	3:57
9.	"Superwoman"	Kenneth Edmonds; L.A. Reid; Daryl Simmons	Mills	5:03
10.	"Hey Mama"	H. Headley; I. Headley	Iric Headley	3:29
11.	"I Wish"	H. Headley; I. Headley; Thomas	Thomas	4:00
12.	"Home"	Charlie Smalls	Mills	4:02

== Personnel ==
- Heather Headley – lead vocals, backing vocals
- Keith Thomas – keyboards (1–6, 11), programming (1–6, 11), acoustic piano (11)
- Jonathan Crone – keyboards (1–6, 11), programming (1–6, 11), guitars (1–6, 11)
- Carl Marsh – additional programming (3)
- Blair Masters – keyboards (7–9, 12), Hammond B3 organ (7–9, 12)
- Zachary Hall – additional keyboards (7–9, 12), percussion (7–9, 12), backing vocals (7–9, 12)
- Paul Mills – additional keyboards (7–9, 12), percussion (7–9, 12)
- Jason Webb – acoustic piano (7–9, 12)
- Iric Headley – keyboards (10), programming (10), backing vocals (10)
- Jerry McPherson – guitars (7–9, 12), electric guitars (11)
- Maurice Fitzgerald – bass (7–9, 12)
- Adam Nitti – bass (11)
- Ken Lewis – drums (1–6)
- Ben Phillips – drums (1–6)
- Dan Needham – drums (7–9, 12)
- Shannon Forrest – drums (11)
- David Davidson – string contractor (7–9, 12)
- Rob Lewis – orchestra arrangements (11)
- Diane Louie – orchestration (11)
- Joe Soldo – orchestra conductor (11)
- Bruce Dukov – concertmaster (11)
- The Nashville Recording Orchestra – strings (7–9, 11, 12)
- Chris Mann – lead vocals (3)

=== Production ===
- Heather Headley – executive producer
- Brian Musso – executive producer
- Chris Thomason – executive producer
- Amy Stansell – project manager
- Daryl Bush – production coordinator (1–6, 11)
- Jonathan Crone – production coordinator (1–6, 11)
- Lisa Stuart – production coordinator (1–6, 11)
- Baheo "Bobby" Shin – production coordinator (7–9, 12)
- Micah Kandros – package design, photography
- John Baruck, Cerisa Roulston and Front Line Management – management

Technical

- Vlado Meller – mastering at Masterdisk (New York, NY)
- Mark Santangelo – mastering assistant
- Peter Cho – mastering project manager
- Jonathan Crone – recording (1–6, 11)
- Keith Thomas – recording (1–6)
- Baheo "Bobby" Shin – recording (7–9, 12)
- Paul Mills – vocal recording (7–9, 12), additional recording (7–9, 12), mixing (7–9, 12)
- Iric Headley – mixing (10)
- Bill Whittington – engineer (10), recording (11), mixing (11)
- Jason Latham – drum tracking assistant (1–6)
- Jeff Breakey – assistant engineer (7–9, 12)
- Ethan Nichols – assistant engineer (7–9, 12)
- Nick Spezia – assistant engineer (7–9, 12)
- Bob Clark – assistant engineer (11)

== Charts ==
Chart (2012)	Peak position
US Billboard 200	187
US Top R&B/Hip-Hop Albums (Billboard)	25
