= Circle of Life: An Environmental Fable =

Film formerly shown at Epcot

Epcot
- Area: The Land pavilion
- Coordinates: 28°22′27.76″N 81°33′7.94″W
- Status: Removed
- Opening date: January 21, 1995
- Closing date: February 3, 2018
- Replaced: Symbiosis
- Replaced by: Awesome Planet (World Nature)

Ride statistics
- Attraction type: Documentary
- Designer: Walt Disney Imagineering
- Theme: The Lion King, Environmental
- Vehicle type: Movie theater seats
- Audience capacity: 428 per show
- Duration: 12:22
- Sponsor: Nestlé (1995–2009)
- Wheelchair accessible
- Assistive listening available

Circle of Life: An Environmental Fable is a 1995 documentary short film featuring characters from Disney Animation's 1994 film The Lion King. It was shown in the Harvest Theater in The Land pavilion at Epcot in Walt Disney World, Orlando, Florida. It opened on January 21, 1995, replacing Symbiosis. The main narrator of the story is Simba.

== Plot ==
In the film, Timon and Pumbaa are chopping down trees and clogging up rivers to build the Hakuna Matata Lakeside Village. Simba comes to them and explains how their actions are harmful to nature. This lesson was explained with live-action footage, some left over from Symbiosis (with clips of people such as Native Americans, Native Hawaiians and Masai, clips of New York City and other locations such as the Amazon rainforest, Serengeti, Andes, Las Vegas, Geno's Steaks in Philadelphia, and images of animals such as monkeys, bald eagles, snakes, elephants and wildebeest).

The film opens with Mufasa's voice explaining that everyone is connected in the great circle of life. A montage of animals and a few clips from Symbiosis open to the song, Circle of Life.

The focus of the main story is on Simba. He decided to show Timon and Pumbaa how another creature (man) is similarly forgetting how everyone is connected. He explained to them that, at first, they were small in numbers, so they only took what they needed to survive, which at that time was not much. However, as the human population grew, necessities for living space, power, and food increased.

Timon and Pumbaa are initially excited by man's developments, but Simba shows them the price that comes with the human necessities. He explains that humans have caused harm to the environment with their excessive consumption through activity such as deforestation, endangerment of species and pollution. He says that once humans realized what they were destroying, they began to repair the damage through recycling, alternative energy and conservation programs. He explains that humans helped other creatures in nature by studying them to learn their needs.

Timon and Pumbaa decide to help the humans give back to nature, but Simba shows them that they already can at home. Timon and Pumbaa unclog the rivers, thus giving the water back to the other creatures on the Savannah. Simba ends the story with his roar and the film closes with a shorter montage set to the end of the title song.

== Production ==
Walt Disney World News Today explained that the "Symbiosis film would be replaced in 1995 with Circle of Life: An Environmental Fable". Some scenes were recycled from Symbiosis into the new film. Animated sequences and a character-driven narrative made up the film, which was inspired by The Lion King. The article added that the "1990s were a decade in which conservation became a hot-button topic, and Circle of Life was there to keep Epcot's finger on the pulse, so much so that the film holds up quite well and covers environmental issues still facing us 17 years later".

In addition to the live-action footage, the film featured about two-and-a-half minutes of new animation, featuring characters from The Lion King and produced by Walt Disney Feature Animation.

The attraction permanently closed on February 3, 2018.

== Cast ==
- Simba (voiced by Cam Clarke)
- Mufasa (voiced by James Earl Jones)
- Timon (voiced by Nathan Lane)
- Pumbaa (voiced by Ernie Sabella)
- Circle of Life Singer (voiced by Carmen Twillie)

== See also ==
- Epcot attraction and entertainment history
