= Symbiosis (1982 film) =

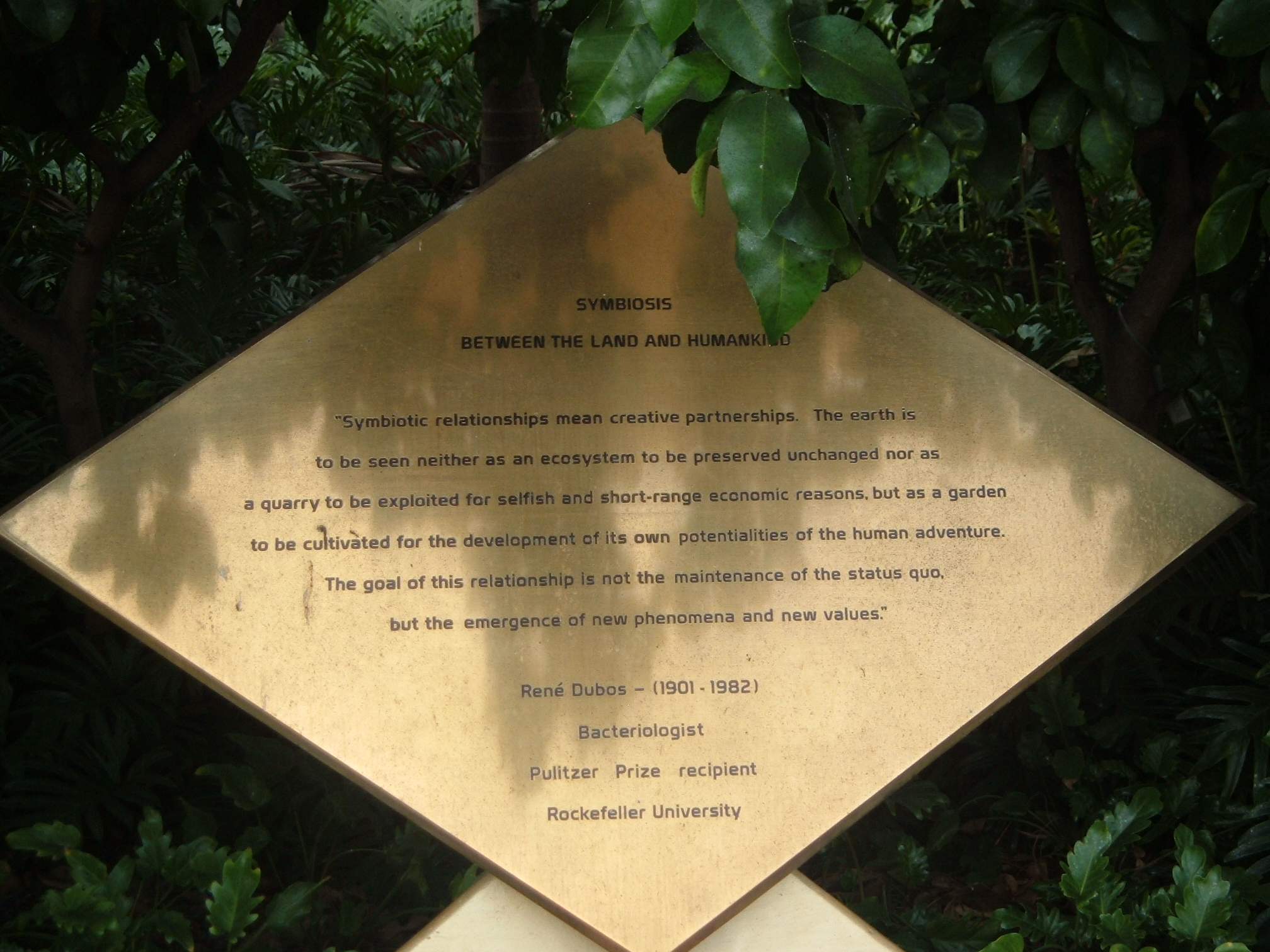
- A plaque describing the process of symbiosis, at The Land pavilion at Epcot, Walt Disney World.

Epcot
- Area: The Land pavilion (Future World)
- Status: Removed
- Opening date: October 1, 1982
- Closing date: January 1, 1995
- Replaced by: Circle of Life: An Environmental Fable

Ride statistics
- Attraction type: Theater
- Designer: Walt Disney Imagineering
- Directed by: Paul Gerber
- Producer: Sascha Schneider
- Assistant Director: Paul Lawrence
- Camera man: Marc Wolff
- Narrated by: Philip L. Clarke

Symbiosis was a 70 mm documentary shown from October 1982 to January 1995 in the Harvest Theater at The Land pavilion at Epcot at the Walt Disney World Resort in Lake Buena Vista, Florida. It was directed by Paul Gerber and narrated by veteran voice-actor Philip L. Clarke.

The film focused on the balance between technological expansion and the protection of the environment. The film showed environmental damage caused by humans and what is being done to fix the damage created.

The film was projected on a 23x60 foot screen, and used a 13-track digital sound system.

It closed on January 1, 1995, and was replaced by Circle of Life: An Environmental Fable. The new film featured characters from Disney's 1994 film The Lion King and included some re-edited footage from Symbiosis.

The film has since been shown at film festivals specializing in the 70 mm film format; at the National Media Museum in 1998, and in Karlsruhe, Germany in 2012.

== See also ==
- Epcot attraction and entertainment history
