= Metro Spirit =

- April 14, 2011, issue
- Type: Alternative news Weekly free newspaper
- Owner(s): 15 House LLC
- Publisher: Joe White
- Headquarters: Augusta, Georgia (USA)
- Website: metrospirit.com

The Metro Spirit, now defunct, was a free alternative news weekly based in Augusta, Georgia (USA), that covered local entertainment, events and culture. At its peak, the paper had an estimated circulation of 19,000 and was widely available at newsstands across the Augusta area. In 2007, the publication became a member of the Association of Alternative Newsmedia (AAN), a network of newspapers and magazines across the U.S. that provides alternative journalism to local mainstream media, with the editorial team led by Editor Tom Grant.

Originally monikered “Metropolitan Spirit”, the paper was launched in 1989 by local entrepreneur David Vantrease. In 2003, it was acquired by Portico Publications of Charlottesville, VA. The publication was rebranded and published under several acting publishers based in Augusta including: Joe White, Amber Carlson, Bryan Osborne, and Matt Plocha. Eventually, with no Augusta-based publisher, the paper was run from Charlottesville headquarters, though staff continued working locally in Augusta.

On March 2, 2011, publishing was suspended by Portico, citing poor financial performance. However, the Metro Spirit resumed publication on April 14, under former publisher-turned-owner Joe White. The paper continued to operate in print for several years before transitioning to digital -only format, where editors opined on local happenings. The outlet's last story post appears to have been shared on Facebook in December 2020.

The Metro Spirit launched a website around 1996, which is now inactive.

== See also ==
- Media in Augusta, Georgia
