= Heather Headley =

Trinidadian-American singer

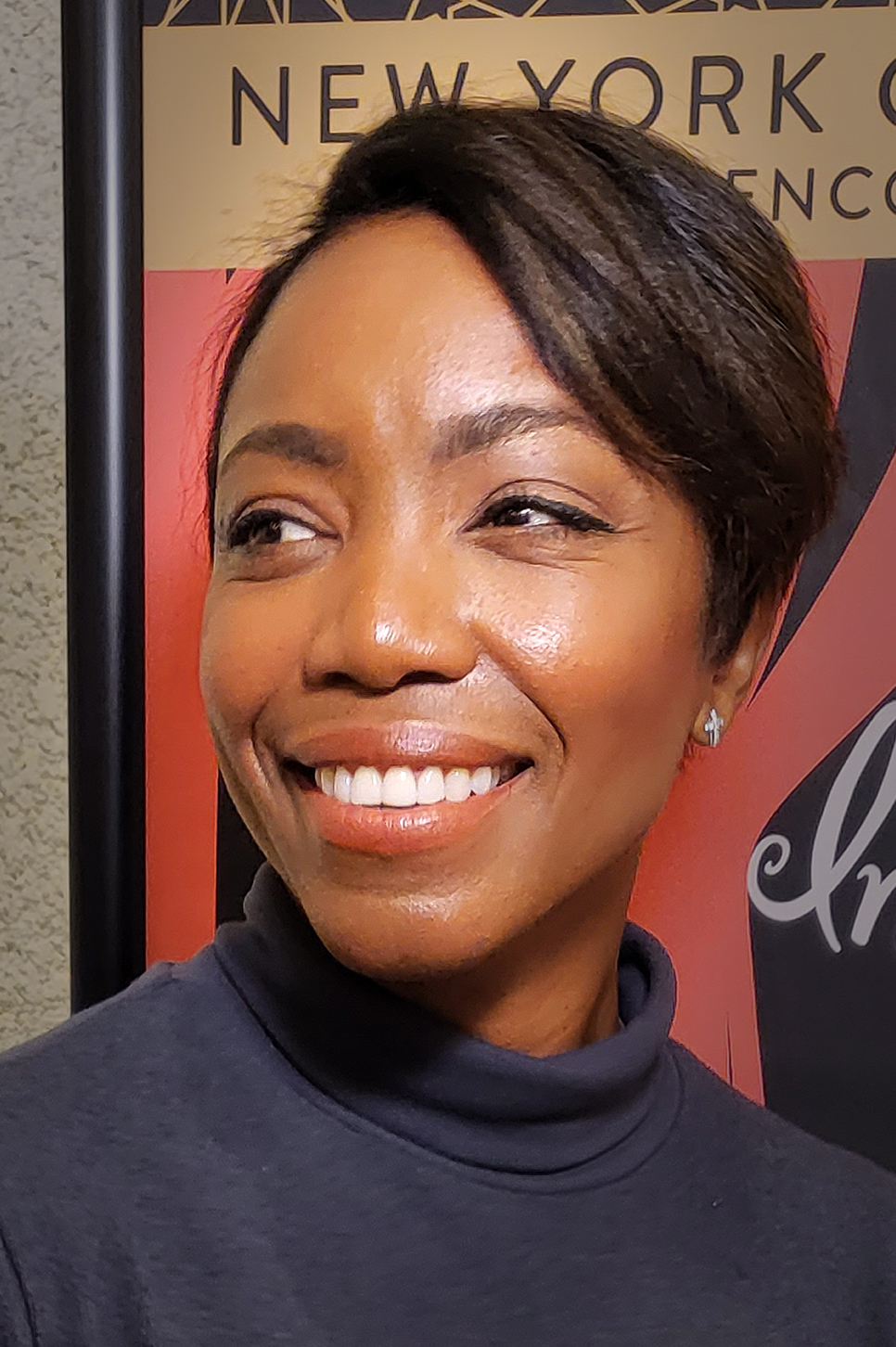
- Headley in 2022

Background information
- Born: October 5, 1974 (age 52); Barataria, Trinidad and Tobago
- Genres: R&B; soul; inspirational; gospel
- Occupations: Singer; songwriter; record producer; actress
- Years active: 1997–present
- Labels: RCA, EMI Gospel
- Spouse: Brian Musso

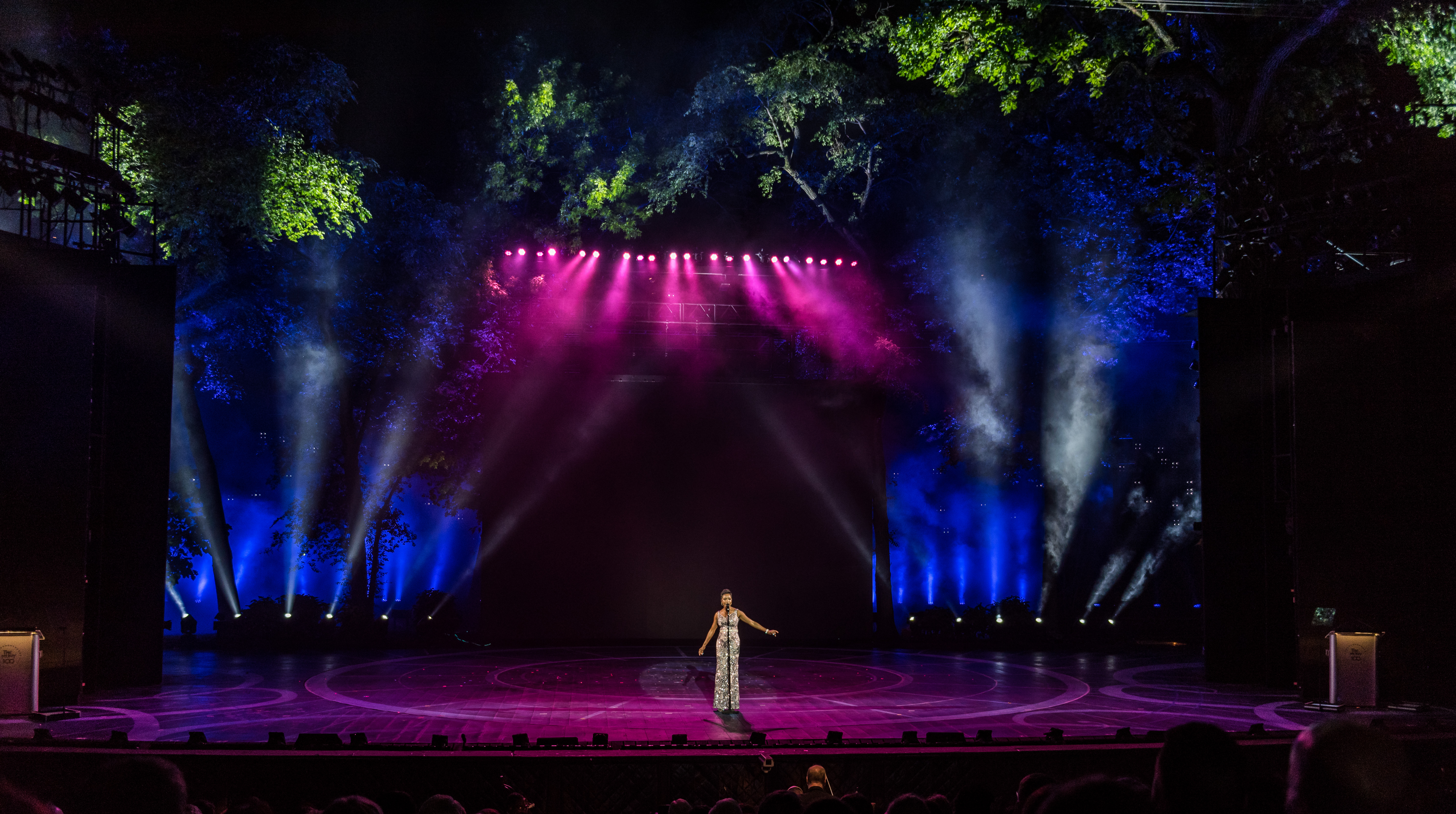
Heather Headley on stage at The Muny Theater in St. Louis, MO. 2018.

Heather Headley (born October 5, 1974) is a Trinidadian-American singer, songwriter, record producer and actress. She won the 2000 Tony Award for Best Actress in a Musical for the title role of Aida. She also won the 2010 Grammy Award for Best Contemporary R&B Gospel Album for her album Audience of One. In 2018, she recurred as Gwen Garrett on the NBC medical drama television series Chicago Med. She starred on the Netflix series Sweet Magnolias, which debuted in 2020 and is in its fifth season as of June 2026.

== Early life ==
Headley was born in Trinidad, the daughter of Hannah and Eric Headley (Barbadian). In 1989, she moved to Fort Wayne, Indiana, in the United States at the age of fifteen with her mother and brother Eric Junior when her father was offered a job as pastor of McKee Street Church of God with headquarters in Anderson, Indiana. Headley attended Northrop High School, and was a member of their resident show choir, Charisma, and starred as Fanny Brice in the school's production of Funny Girl. After graduating from high school in 1993, Headley attended Northwestern University from 1993 to 1996, to study musical theatre until the last day of her junior year, when she made the decision to become a part of the musical Ragtime and leave school.

== Career ==
Headley's stage career began in 1996 when she was cast as a member of the ensemble in the original Toronto production of the musical Ragtime where she was an understudy for Audra McDonald in the role of Sarah. Her breakthrough came the following year when she originated the role of Nala in the Broadway musical The Lion King. Headley's performance was well received, and she then originated the title role in the Broadway adaptation of Aida, earning the Tony Award for Best Actress in 2000. In 1999, she appeared in the Encores! staged concert production of Do Re Mi, with Nathan Lane, Randy Graff, and Brian Stokes Mitchell. She starred in an Actors' Fund of America benefit concert version of the musical Dreamgirls alongside McDonald and Lillias White in 2001.

In the autumn of 2006, Heather performed Hal David and Burt Bacharach's song "I'll Never Fall In Love Again", from the 1968 musical Promises, Promises, for "The Kennedy Center Presents: The 2006 Mark Twain Prize", honoring playwright Neil Simon. The ceremony was later broadcast on PBS.

On July 5, 2007, Headley made a guest appearance for Andrea Bocelli's Vivere Live in Tuscany concert in Lajatico, Italy. They performed Vivo Per Lei and The Prayer. Headley sang "My Country, 'Tis of Thee" (also known as "America") with Josh Groban on January 18, 2009, during the We Are One: The Obama Inaugural Celebration at the Lincoln Memorial. On March 12, 2009, Headley sang "I Wish" on The Tonight Show with Jay Leno.

From November 2012 until August 2013, Headley played the role of Rachel Marron, in the musical adaptation of Whitney Houston's 1992 movie, The Bodyguard at London's Adelphi Theatre. She was nominated for an Olivier Award and a What's On Stage Award for this performance.

Heather joined the Andrea Bocelli UK Tour playing Glasgow Hydro on November 23 and at the Leeds First Direct Arena on November 24, 2013.

On May 10, 2016, Headley assumed the role of Shug Avery from Jennifer Hudson in the recent Broadway revival of The Color Purple, which closed on January 8, 2017, at the Bernard B. Jacobs Theatre.

In May 2022, Headley played the Witch in the Encores! version of Into the Woods. She starred alongside Sara Bareilles, Neil Patrick Harris, Gavin Creel, and Denée Benton.

=== Music ===
Headley released her debut album, This Is Who I Am, in October 2002 with RCA Records. Although its first single, "He Is", was not very successful, the second single, "I Wish I Wasn't", achieved moderate success. The work on this album earned her a Grammy Award nomination for Best Female R&B Vocal Performance and for Best New Artist making her the first Tony Award winner to be nominated for this award.

Her second album, In My Mind (2006) was delayed due to the various executive shake-ups associated with RCA parent BMG's merger with Sony. Under BMG North America chairman/CEO Clive Davis for the first time, Headley released her second album In My Mind in January 2006. The title track "In My Mind" (written and produced by India.Arie collaborator Shannon Sanders) was released as the first single; and its music video was directed by Diane Martel. The song reached number-one on the U.S. Hot Dance Music/Club Play chart. The second single "Me Time" was sent to Urban AC radio only. An album track, "Am I Worth It", served to promote Headley's New March of Dimes Educational Campaign "I Want My 9 Months".

In 2009, Headley, along with Al Green, released a version of the song "People Get Ready" on the compilation album Oh Happy Day: An All-Star Music Celebration.

In January 2010 she won her first Grammy Award for Best Contemporary R&B Gospel Album for Audience of One on the EMI Gospel label.

In December 2010, Headley performed a duet version of "Blue Christmas" and "My Prayer" with Italian tenor Andrea Bocelli on his "My Christmas" tour in 5 US cities. At the Prudential Center in Newark, NJ, on December 4, 2010, the audience insisted on a second encore with Bocelli. Bocelli had to summon the detail to go and bring her back on stage.

Headley released her album Only One in the World on September 25, 2012, with the lead single "A Little While".

In September 2013, Headley appeared on America's Got Talent with Il Divo and sang "Can You Feel the Love Tonight?" from The Lion King. She also appeared with Il Divo on Broadway for a limited concert run in 2013.

=== Television and film ===
Starting in 2017, Headley appeared in a recurring role on the TV series She's Gotta Have It as Dr. Jamison. In 2018, she appeared in a recurring role as Gwen Garrett on the TV series Chicago Med.

In 2019, Headley was cast as one of the three leads in the Netflix series Sweet Magnolias. She also voiced the part of Fikiri as Makini's Mother in The Lion Guard.

In 2021, Headley starred as gospel legend Clara Ward in Respect, the Aretha Franklin biopic.

== Personal life ==
In 2003, Headley married Brian Musso, an investment advisor who briefly played for the New York Jets. Both attended Northwestern University. On December 1, 2009, they welcomed their first child John David. Headley had her second son Jordan Chase on August 18, 2014. In April 2019, the couple welcomed a third child, a daughter.

== Discography ==
=== Studio albums ===
Title	Details	Peak chart positions		Certifications (sales threshold)
Title	Details	US	US R&B	Certifications (sales threshold)
This Is Who I Am	Release date: October 8, 2002; Label: RCA Records; Formats: CD, music download	38	14	RIAA: Gold
In My Mind	Release date: January 31, 2006; Label: RCA Records; Formats: CD, music download	5	1	RIAA: Gold
Audience of One	Release date: January 13, 2009; Label: EMI Christian Music Group; Formats: CD, music download	27	6	
Only One in the World	Release date: September 25, 2012; Label: in:ciite Media; Formats: CD, music download	187	25	
Broadway My Way	Release date: November 14, 2018; Label: in:ciite Media; Formats: music download			
"—" denotes releases that did not chart or were not released to that country

=== Compilation albums ===
Title	Details
Playlist: The Very Best of Heather Headley	Release date: May 29, 2012; Label: Legacy Recordings; Formats: CD, music download

=== Singles ===
Year	Song	Peak chart positions						Album
Year	Song	US Hot 100	US R&B	US Dance	US AC	US Gospel	Hot Adult R&B	Album
1999	"A Step Too Far" (with Elton John and Sherie Rene Scott)	—	—	—	15	—	—	Elton John and Tim Rice's Aida
2002	"He Is"	90	38	4	—	—	1	This Is Who I Am
2003	"I Wish I Wasn't"	55	15	5	—	—	1	This Is Who I Am
2005	"In My Mind"	75	16	1	—	—	2	In My Mind
2006	"Me Time"	—	35	—	—	—	5	In My Mind
2008	"Jesus Is Love"	—	59	—	—	10	29	Audience of One
2008	"Do You Hear What I Hear?"	—	—	—	—	—	—	Non-album single
2012	"A Little While"	—	—	—	—	—	—	Only One in the World
"—" denotes releases that did not chart

=== Other ===
Song	Year	Album
"Can You Feel the Love Tonight"	1997	The Lion King on Broadway Cast Recording
"Shadowland"	1997	The Lion King on Broadway Cast Recording
"The Madness of King Scar"	1997	The Lion King on Broadway Cast Recording
"Love Will Find a Way" (with Kenny Lattimore)	1998	Return to Pride Rock
"Just One Dream"	2001	Golden Dreams (film at Disney California Adventure Park)
"People Get Ready" (with Al Green)	2009	Oh Happy Day
“A Dream is a Wish your heart makes”	2017	Disney Illuminations (nighttime spectacular at Disneyland Paris)

== Filmography ==
=== Film ===
Year	Title	Role	Notes
1992	Fantasmic!	Princess Medley	Short
2001	Elmo's Magic Cookbook	Pocket Queen	Video
2004	Dirty Dancing: Havana Nights	Rosa Negra Singer	
2004	Breakin' All the Rules	Herself	
2021	Respect	Clara Ward	

=== Television ===
Year	Title	Role	Notes
2017–19	She's Gotta Have It	Dr. Clara Jamison	Recurring cast
2018–21	Chicago Med	Gwen Garrett	Recurring: season 4; guest: seasons 3, 5–6
2019	The Lion Guard	Fikiri (voice)	Episode: "Journey of Memories"
2020–26	Sweet Magnolias	Helen Decatur	Main cast

== Awards and nominations ==
=== Music ===
Year	Award	Category	Recording	Result
2002	Soul Train Award	Best R&B/Soul or Rap New Artist	"He Is"	Nominated
2003	Billboard Music Award	R&B/Hip-Hop New Artist of the Year		Nominated
2003	NAACP Image Award	Outstanding Female Artist		Nominated
2003	NAACP Image Award	Outstanding New Artist		Nominated
2003	Soul Train Lady of Soul Award	R&B/Soul Album of the Year - Solo	"This Is Who I Am"	Won
2003	Soul Train Lady of Soul Award	Best R&B/Soul or Rap New Artist - Solo	"He Is"	Won
2003	Soul Train Lady of Soul Award	Best R&B/Soul Single - Solo	"He Is"	Nominated
2004	Grammy Award	Best New Artist		Nominated
2004	Grammy Award	Best Female R&B Vocal Performance	"I Wish I Wasn't"	Nominated
2006	BET J Cool Like That Award			Nominated
2010	Grammy Award	Best Contemporary R&B Gospel Album	"Audience Of One"	Won
2010	Grammy Award	Best Gospel Performance	"Jesus Is Love"	Nominated

=== Theatre ===
Year	Award	Category	Work	Result	Ref.
2000	Tony Award	Best Actress in a Musical	Aida	Won	
2000	Drama Desk Award	Outstanding Actress in a Musical	Aida	Won	
2000	Outer Critics Circle Award	Outstanding Actress in a Musical	Aida	Nominated	
2000	Sarah Siddons Award			Awardee	
2013	Laurence Olivier Award	Best Actress in a Musical	The Bodyguard	Nominated	
2013	WhatsOnStage Award	Best Actress in a Musical	The Bodyguard	Nominated	
