= Lebo M =

South African musician (born 1964)

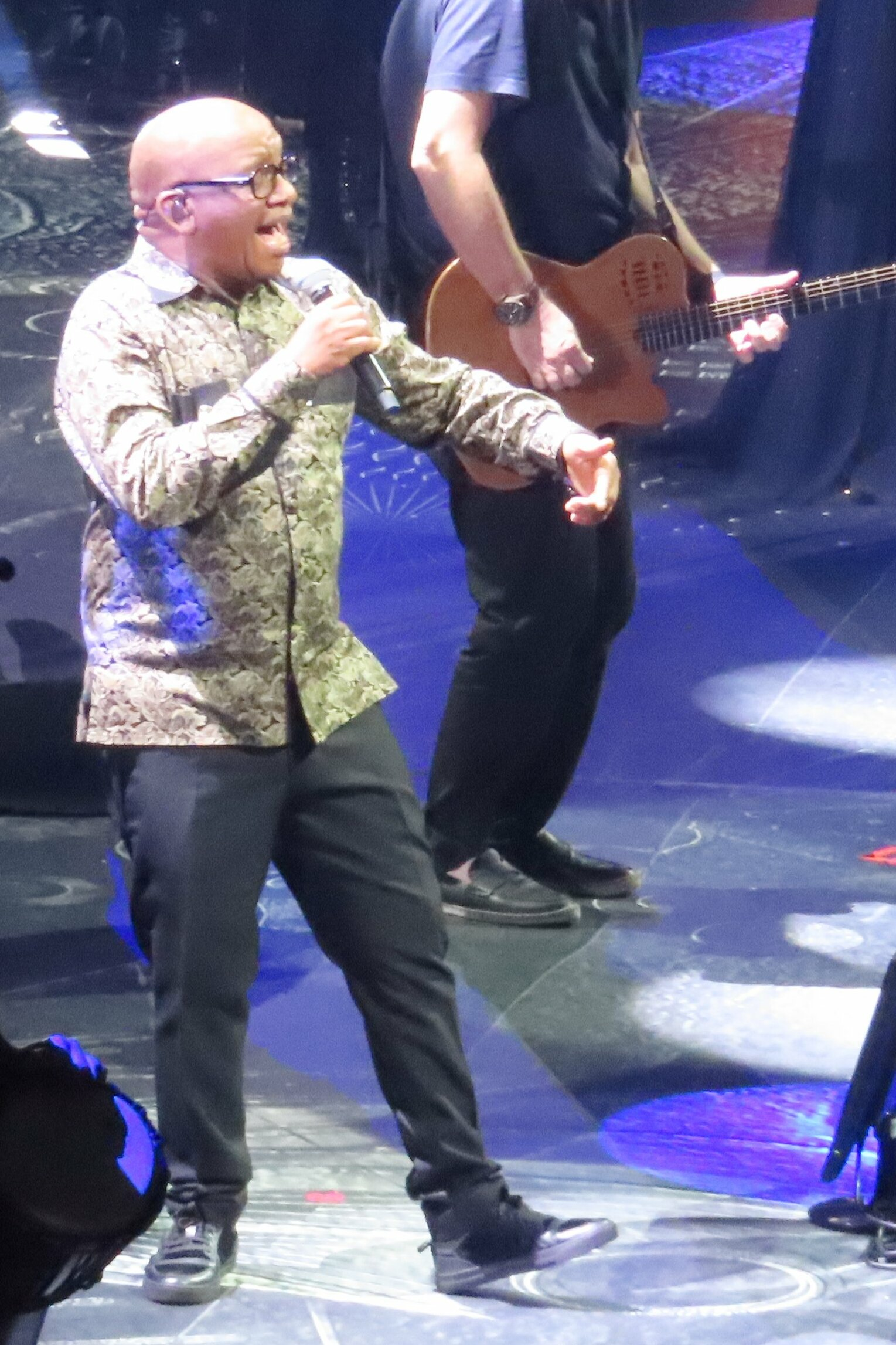
- Morake in 2016

Background information
- Born: Lebohang Morake; 11 July 1964 (age 62); Soweto, Johannesburg, South Africa
- Occupations: Producer, composer, arranger, performer
- Instrument: Vocals
- Years active: 1977–present
- Label: Till Dawn Entertainment

Lebohang Morake (born 11 July 1964), known as Lebo M, is a South African producer and composer, known for his songwriting and vocal work on the soundtracks to films such as The Lion King, The Power of One and Outbreak and numerous stage productions. He was recommended to Disney by Hans Zimmer, the composer of both adaptations of The Lion King, and formed and conducted the African choir that sang for the films.

== Early life ==
Lebohang Morake was born on 11 July 1964 in Soweto, Johannesburg, South Africa. With no formal training in music, he left school at the age of nine to perform music in night clubs. Morake recorded his first single, "Celebration", when he was 13 years old, receiving only $20 for recording the record. When he was 13 years old, Morake became the youngest performer to sing at the nightclub Club Pelican, when he filled in for a backup singer who could not attend.

== Career ==
=== Early career ===
In 1979, Morake sought to broaden his horizons, so he left by bus for Maseru, Lesotho, after hearing that a new club was going to be opening there. In Maseru, due to the apartheid system, he was under exile. At 15, he was working as a singer in the Victoria Hotel in Lesotho when Lesotho's Ambassador to the United States Tim Thahane noticed him and appreciated his musical abilities. Thahane helped Morake apply to the Duke Ellington School of the Arts, coordinating with the TransAfrica organization to send the singer to the United States. Morake lived at first in New York, again playing in restaurants and bars, and was supported by Black churches to attend music school. Morake moved to Los Angeles when he was 18 to pursue a music career.

=== Start in Hollywood ===
In Los Angeles, he struggled to make ends meet, working odd jobs to survive while studying at Los Angeles City College. He performed sometimes at Memory Lane, a nightclub owned by Marla Gibbs. Morake was asked to help find a choir for the Oscars, so that they could perform music from 1987's Cry Freedom, a film about South Africa that was nominated for multiple Academy Awards, including one for Best Original Song. He made further strides in his music career when by chance, he ran into childhood friend Solly Letwaba, who was the bassist for Johnny Clegg. Letwaba introduced Morake to Clegg's producer, Hilton Rosenthal, who employed Morake as an intern and gofer for his production studio. Rosenthal was the music supervisor on the film The Power of One, and through him, Morake met the film's composer, Hans Zimmer. After being asked about some ideas for the film's soundtrack, Morake ended up co-writing and co-producing the music for The Power of One with Zimmer, helping to arrange the choruses. Morake used his knowledge of African rhythms to compose the soundtracks to other films, such as Congo (1995), Outbreak (1995), and Born to be Wild (1995). He decided to return to South Africa in the early 1990s, after the end of apartheid.

=== The Lion King ===
Morake wrote and sang the opening Zulu chant at the beginning of Disney's The Lion King, for which he was sought by Zimmer. He also contributed to the sequel to the film's soundtrack, Rhythm of the Pride Lands, and the film's direct-to-video sequel The Lion King II: Simba's Pride.

The duo composed so much music that Disney approved an additional soundtrack album, Rhythm of the Pride Lands, containing extra compositions. The Lion King's original soundtrack, with the compositions that had made the cut for the theatrical release, earned the two composers a Grammy Award, and Zimmer won an Academy Award for Best Original Score. Morake also helped score The Lion King's stage musical, creating new music and adding pieces from Rhythm of the Pride Lands. The musical was nominated for Best Original Score at the 52nd Tony Awards in 1998.

He founded the Lebo M Foundation and Till Dawn Entertainment.

On 23 July 2019, Morake performed "Circle of Life" and "He Lives in You" at the opening ceremony of the 24th World Scout Jamboree.

In April 2024, it was announced that Lebo M would join the music team for Mufasa: The Lion King, providing additional music alongside the film's songwriter, Lin-Manuel Miranda.

In 2026 Morake sued comedian Learnmore Jonasi for 27 million dollars, for making a joke about the lyrics of 'The circle of life'. After Morake dropped the suit, Jonasi’s legal team filed a motion under California’s anti-SLAPP statute. As a result, Morake was ordered to pay Jonasi's legal fees, totaling $40,000 as compensation for his legal expenses.

== Personal life ==
Morake was married to Viveca Gipson for 5 years. He divorced her and married Nandi Ndlovu and they were together for 11 years. He then divorced Ndlovu and married Angela Ngani-Casara for five years, from 2008 to 2013. Morake became engaged to Zoe Mthiyane but their relationship ended in 2016. He remarried his third wife, Angela, but they divorced again in 2017. He lives with his family in Johannesburg and Los Angeles. His daughter Refi is also a singer who often performs by his side. In April 2021, Morake got engaged to partner Pretty Samuels, in 2023 he had presumably filed for divorce.

== Filmography ==
Lebo Morake has composed, arranged, performed and produced music for the following films:

- The Lion King (soundtrack)
- The Lion King II: Simba's Pride
- The Lion King 1½
- The Lion King (musical) – singer at One by One
- The Power of One
- Dinosaur
- Disney's Animal Kingdom: The First Adventure
- Tears of the Sun
- Back on the Block
- Atlantis: The Lost Empire
- Listen Up: The Life of Quincy Jones
- Outbreak
- Congo
- Born to Be Wild
- Long Night's Journey Into Day
- The Lion King (2019 remake)
- The Woman King (2022)
- Mufasa: The Lion King (2024)

== Discography ==
- How Wonderful We Are (1995)
- Rhythm of the Pride Lands (1995)
- Lebo M: Deeper Meaning (1997)
- Return to Pride Rock (1998)
- Lebo M Presents: Open Summahhh Open Happiness (2009)
