= Jack Feldman (songwriter) =

American Tony Award-winning lyricist h

- Origin: Long Island, New York, U.S.
- Occupations: Songwriter; lyricist

Jack Feldman is an American lyricist who has written songs for television, film, and Broadway. He has worked on many Disney movies ranging from Oliver & Company to The Lion King II: Simba's Pride, collaborating with Alan Menken on the songs for Newsies. He wrote the lyrics for Barry Manilow's Grammy Award–winning song "Copacabana" and won a Tony along with Alan Menken for the stage musical version of Newsies. More recently, he collaborated with Benj Pasek and Justin Paul on writing additional lyrics for some of the duo's new songs for Disney's live-action remake of Snow White. Feldman grew up on Long Island.

== Career ==
Jack Feldman wrote the lyrics in the following works.

=== Film ===
- Oliver & Company (song: "Perfect Isn't Easy")
- Newsies
- Home Alone 2 (song: "My Christmas Tree")
- Thumbelina
- A Goofy Movie
- The Lion King II: Simba's Pride
- 102 Dalmatians (song: "Cruella De Vil 2000")
- Snow White (new songs; additional lyricist)

=== Theatre ===
- Newsies

=== Television ===
- The Wubbulous World of Dr. Seuss
- The Little Mermaid (songs: "You Got to Be You", "Just a Little Love")

== Awards and nominations ==
Award	Year	Category	Nominee	Result
13th Golden Raspberry Awards	1993	Worst Original Song	for: Newsies (1992); Shared with: Alan Menken (music); For the song "High Times, Hard Times"	Won
15th Golden Raspberry Awards	1995	Worst Original Song	for: Thumbelina (1994); Shared with: Barry Manilow (music) and Bruce Sussman (lyrics); For the song "Marry The Mole!"	Won
Annie Awards	1999	Outstanding Individual Achievement for Music in an Animated Feature Production	for: The Lion King II: Simba's Pride (1998); Shared with: Tom Snow (composer) and Marty Panzer (lyricist); For the song "We Are One"	Nominated
Tony Awards	2012	Best Original Score (Music And/Or Lyrics) Written for the Theatre	Newsies	Won
