= Sharlene Hector =

English musical theatre actress and singer

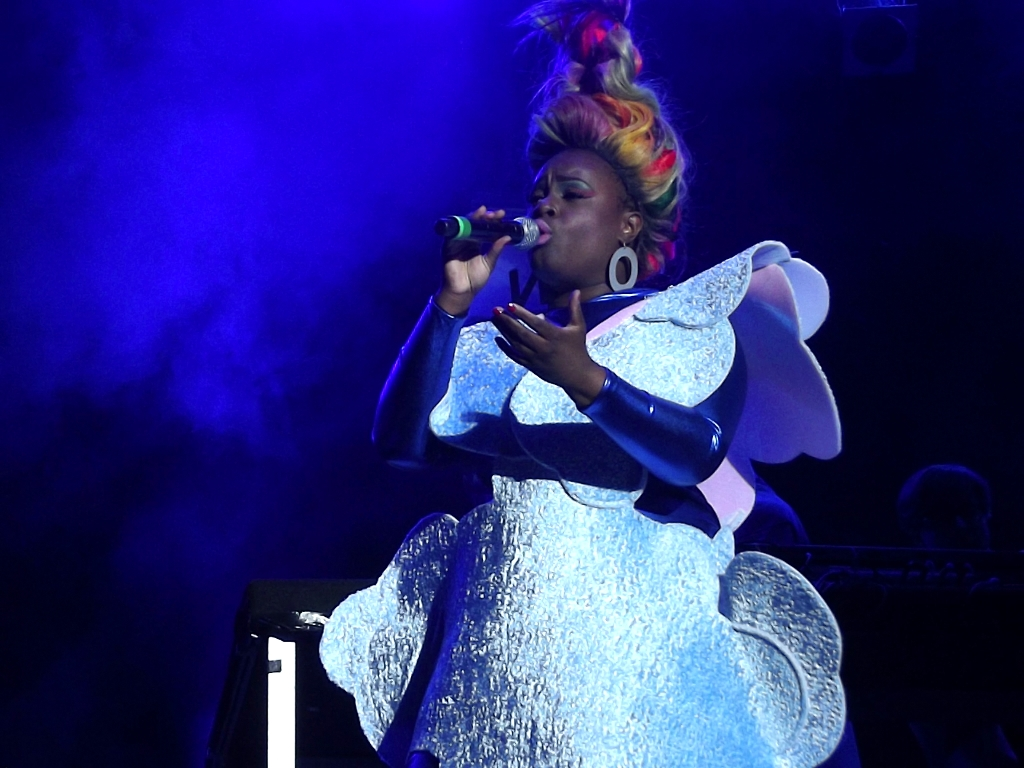
- Hector performing as part of Basement Jaxx in 2013

Background information
- Occupations: Singer; Musical theatre performer
- Instrument: Vocal
- Formerly of: Basement Jaxx

Sharlene Hector is an English musical theatre actress and singer. She is best known as one of the Muses, Clio, in the West End production of Disney's Hercules and for being the lead vocalist of the British band Basement Jaxx.

== Career ==
=== Music ===
As a child, Hector used to sing in church. At around the age of 18, she started performing in ensemble at music awards such as MOBO and the Brit Awards.

Hector was the singer for the electronic music duo Basement Jaxx as well as providing backing vocals for Sam Sparro, Natasha Bedingfield, Boy George (including in his stage musical Taboo) and Mary J. Blige.

=== Musical Theatre ===
Hector made her West End debut in the cast of Hairspray, at the London Coliseum, in the role of Lorraine and 1st cover for Motormouth Maybelle.

Hector then played the lead role of Effie White (as an alternate to Nicole Raquel Dennis) in the UK tour of Dreamgirls from 2021 to 2023. The production was directed and choreographed by Casey Nicholaw, with set and costume design by Tim Hatley, lighting design by Hugh Vanstone.

In February 2024, Hector joined the cast of Standing at the Sky's Edge as Grace/Alice, when the show transferred in the West End at the Gillian Lynne Theatre, after a successful run at the National Theatre and Sheffield Theatres.

Hector joined the cast of the UK premiere of Michael R. Jackson's A Strange Loop at the Barbican Theatre as Thought 1. The show was only the tenth musical to win the Pulitzer Prize for Drama, previously won by Hamilton.

In November 2024 Hector played Vel King in Here & Now at The Alexandra, in Birmingham. The show was produced by the British pop group Steps in collaboration with theatre company ROYO and Pete Waterman and featured many of the band's most famous songs. The show became the venue's fastest selling show, with half of the run being sold in the first 24 hours from ticket release. Also in the cast were Blake Patrick Anderson, Rebecca Lock and Hiba Elchikhe.

In January 2025 full cast for Hercules at the Theatre Royal, Drury Lane was announced, with Hector in role role of Clio, one of the five muses, joining other Muses Candace Furbert (as Thalia), Brianna Ogunbawo (as Melpomene), Malinda Parris (as Calliope), and Robyn Rose-Li (as Terpsichore). Luke Brady starred in the titular role, with Mae Ann Jorolan (as Meg) Trevor Dion Nicholas (as Phil) and Stephen Carlile (as Hades). A special Halloween performance was then announced for the evening on 31 October 2025, with a new third act with a Hades villain take over and a special performance by original Disney's Meg Susan Egan.

== Credits ==
=== Stage ===
Year(s)	Production	Role	Location	Category	Ref.
2021	Hairspray	Lorraine / 1st cover Motormouth Maybelle	London Coliseum	West End	
2021-2023	Dreamgirls	Alternate Effie White	UK tour	UK tour	
2023	A Strange Loop	Thought 1	Barbican Theatre		
2024	Standing at the Sky's Edge	Grace / Alice	Gillian Lynne Theatre	West End	
2024	Here & Now	Vel King	The Alexandra	Regional	
2025	Hercules	Clio	Theatre Royal, Drury Lane	West End	

=== Television ===
Year(s)	Title	Role	Notes	Ref.
	Name That Tune	House band vocalist		
