= Hercules (musical) =

2019 musical by Alan Menken and David Zippel

- The Heroic New Musical
- Promotional Logo
- Music: Alan Menken
- Lyrics: David Zippel
- Book: Kristoffer Diaz (2019); Robert Horn (2023); Kwame Kwei-Armah (2023)
- Setting: Ancient Greece
- Basis: Hercules by Ron Clements; John Musker; Donald McEnery; Bob Shaw; Irene Mecchi
- Productions: 2019 Off-Broadway; 2023 Millburn; 2024 Hamburg; 2025 West End

Hercules is a musical based on the Walt Disney Animation Studios 1997 film of the same name, with music and lyrics by Alan Menken and David Zippel, and a book by Robert Horn and Kwame Kwei-Armah. The production is also loosely based on the legendary hero of the same name, the son of Zeus, in Greek mythology.

Produced by Disney Theatrical Productions, the musical had a tryout at the Delacorte Theater in Central Park in August 2019. It opened in the summer of 2025 at the West End's Theatre Royal, Drury Lane.

== Development ==
In July 2017, Alan Menken announced that he was working on a stage adaptation of the 1997 film Hercules. On February 6, 2019, it was announced that the theatrical adaptation would premiere later that year.

== Productions ==
=== Off-Broadway (2019) ===
The world premiere occurred at the Delacorte Theater in Central Park, Manhattan, New York, as part of its Public Works program from August 31 until September 8. Menken and David Zippel returned to compose and write the songs, while Kristoffer Diaz wrote the book, Lear deBessonet directed, and Chase Brock choreographed. The cast included Jelani Alladin (Hercules), Roger Bart (Hades), Jeff Hiller (Panic), Joel Frost (Nessus), Nelson Chimilio (Pain), James Monroe Iglehart (Phil), Ramona Keller (Thalia), Tamika Lawrence (Calliope), Krysta Rodriguez (Meg), and Rema Webb (Terpsichore). Menken and Zippel wrote new songs for the musical, as well as reusing the film's original works.

=== Millburn (2023) ===
On March 22, 2020, Alan Menken appeared on Rosie O'Donnell's livestream benefit for the Actors Fund, where he talked about his upcoming projects, saying "I'm working on Disenchanted, the sequel to Enchanted, and I have another Broadway show" and in a separate thought, he added "Hercules is coming to the stage. Of course we did that in Central Park last summer." Disney Theatrical subsequently confirmed that they intend to make the product available for licensing. On May 16, 2020, it was reported that Robert Horn will write a new iteration for the musical, with Lear deBessonet returning as director. On August 18, 2020, Menken confirmed that the musical is indeed being adapted to Broadway.

In April 2022, it was announced that a revised version of the musical would play at Paper Mill Playhouse in Millburn, New Jersey during the 2022–23 season, from February 16 to March 19, 2023. The revised book would be written by Kwame Kwei-Armah and Robert Horn. Announced cast members include Bradley Gibson as Hercules, Shuler Hensley as Hades, Iglehart reprising his role as Phil, and Isabelle McCalla as Meg. Rounding out the cast is Charity Angél Dawson (Clio), Tiffany Mann (Calliope), Anastascia McClesky (Thalia), Destinee Rea (Terpischore), and Rashidra Scott (Melpomene) as the Muses, Reggie De Leon and Jeff Blumenkrantz as Pain and Panic, Kathryn Allison as Despina, Allyson Kaye Daniel as Aunt Tithesis/Lachesis, Lucia Giannetta as Atropos, Jesse Nager as Nessus, Dennis Stowe and Kristen Faith Oei as Zeus and Hera, and Anne Fraser Thomas as Clotho.

=== Hamburg (2024–2025) ===
The first international production and world premiere of Hercules opened at the Neue Flora in Hamburg, Germany on March 24, 2024, and was directed by Casey Nicholaw. It is the first Disney stage musical to be developed in Hamburg. On October 25, 2023, it was announced that Benét Monteiro would be taking the lead role. The rest of the cast was presented on December 5, 2023. In August 2024, Philipp Büttner took over the role of Hercules. The production closed on September 4, 2025.

=== West End (2025–2026) ===
The musical opened 24 June 2025 at the West End's Theatre Royal, Drury Lane following previews that began on 6 June with direction and choreography from Casey Nicholaw and additional choreography from Tanisha Scott. Luke Brady plays the title role of Hercules opposite Trevor Dion Nicholas and Stephen Carlile as Phil and Hades, respectively, in the production. Mae Ann Jorolan, who played Meg in the Hamburg production, reprises her role. A one-night-only Halloween performance of the musical was held on 31 October 2025, with attendees encouraged to wear their best villain attire. A special third act was announced, with a Hades villain take over and a special guest appearance of original voice of Meg, Susan Egan. The production played its final performance on 5 September 2026.

== Notable casts ==
| Character | Off-Broadway | Millburn | Hamburg | West End |
| Character | 2019 | 2023 | 2024 | 2025 |
|---|---|---|---|---|
| Hercules | Jelani Alladin | Bradley Gibson | Benét Monteiro | Luke Brady |
| Phil | James Monroe Iglehart | James Monroe Iglehart | Kristofer Weinstein-Storey | Trevor Dion Nicholas |
| Meg | Krysta Rodriguez | Isabelle McCalla | Mae Ann Jorolan | Mae Ann Jorolan |
| Hades | Roger Bart | Shuler Hensley | Detlef Leistenschneider | Stephen Carlile |
| Pain / Karl / Bob | Nelson Chimilio | Reggie De Leon | Mario Saccoccio | Craig Gallivan |
| Panic / Heinz / Charles | Jeff Hiller | Jeff Blumenkrantz | André Haedicke | Lee Zarrett |
| Thalia | Ramona Keller | Anastacia McCleskey | Chasity Crisp | Candace Furbert |
| Calliope | Tamika Lawrence | Tiffany Mann | Leslie Beehann | Malinda Parris |
| Terpsichore | Rema Webb | Destinee Rea | Venolia Manale | Robyn Rose-Li |
| Clio | Brianna Cabrera | Charity Angél Dawson | Jamie-Lee Uzoh | Sharlene Hector |
| Melpomene | Tieisha Thomas | Rashidra Scott | Shekinah McFarlane | Brianna Ogunbawo |

== Musical numbers ==
The music was composed by Alan Menken, with lyrics by David Zippel.

=== Off-Broadway (2019) ===
- "To Be Human" (Prologue)
- "The Gospel Truth"
- "The Gospel Truth" (Reprise 1-"He Ran the Underworld")
- "The Prophecy"
- "The Gospel Truth" (Reprise 2-"Hades Was Not Amused")
- "The Gospel Truth" (Reprise 3-"Young Herc Was Mortal Now")
- "Uniquely Greek Town Square"
- "Go the Distance"
- "One Last Hope"
- "The Gospel Truth" (Reprise 4-"Young Herc Was On His Way")
- "Forget About It"
- "A Cool Day In Hell"
- "Uniquely Greek Tough Town"
- "Zero to Hero"
- "A Cool Day In Hell" (Reprise)
- "One Last Hope" (Reprise)/"Go the Distance" (Reprise 1)
- "The Gospel Truth" (Reprise 5-"Herc Jumped the Garden Wall")
- "I Won't Say (I'm in Love)"
- "Great Bolts of Thunder"
- "Go the Distance" (Reprise 2)
- "To Be Human"
- "A Star Is Born"
- "Go the Distance" (Finale)

=== Millburn (2023) ===
Act I

- "Prologue" – Company
- "Gospel Truth I" – Muses & Ensemble
- "Gospel Truth II" – Muses & Ensemble
- "The Prophecy" – Fates
- "Gospel Truth III" – Muses
- "Despina's Lullaby (Part One)" – Despina
- "Gospel Truth IV" – Muses & Ensemble
- "Uniquely Greek Town Square" – Ensemble
- "Despina's Lullaby (Part Two)" – Despina
- "Go the Distance" – Hercules
- "Phil's Soul Spot" – Phil & Muses
- "One Last Hope" – Phil
- "Gospel Truth V" – Muses
- "Forget About It" – Meg & Hercules
- "Cool Day in Hell" – Hades, Pain, Panic & Fates
- "Uniquely Greek Tough Town" – Ensemble
- "Zero to Hero" – Muses, Hercules, Phil & Ensemble
- "Act One Finale" – Hercules, Muses & Ensemble

Act II

- "A Muse Bouche" – Muses
- "I'm Back!" – Phil
- "One Last Hope/Go the Distance (Reprises)" – Phil & Hercules
- "Cool Reprise in Hell" – Hades, Pain & Panic
- "Gospel Truth VI" – Muses
- "I Won't Say (I'm in Love)" – Meg & Muses
- "Great Bolts of Thunder" – Company
- "To Be Human" – Hercules
- "A Star Is Born" – Company
- "Go the Distance (Finale)" – Company

=== West End (2025) ===
Act I

- "Prologue" – Ensemble
- "The Gospel Truth I (Mt. Olympus)" – Muses, Ensemble
- "The Gospel Truth II (Underworld)" – Muses, Ensemble
- "The Gospel Truth III (Baby Kidnap)" – Muses
- "Despina's Lullaby" – Despina, Muses
- "The Gospel Truth IV (Herc Was Mortal)" – Muses
- "Today's Gonna Be My Day" – Hercules
- "Go the Distance" – Hercules
- "Go the Distance" (Reprise) – Hercules, Muses
- "One Last Hope" – Hercules, Phil
- "Forget About It" – Hercules, Meg
- "The Gospel Truth V (So Not Dead)" – Muses
- "Getting Even" – Hades, Bob, Charles
- "Zero to Hero" – Muses, Hercules, Phil, Ensemble

Act II

- "A Muse Bouche" – Muses
- "I'm Back!" – Phil, Ensemble
- "Getting Even" (Reprise) – Bob, Charles
- "Phil Goes the Distance" – Phil
- "Doomed to Be Human" – Hercules
- "I Won't Say (I'm in Love)" – Meg, Muses
- "I Won't Say (I'm in Love)" (Reprise) – Hercules
- "Great Bolts of Thunder" – Muses, Bob, Charles, Ensemble
- "To Be Human" – Hercules
- "The Gospel Truth VI (That's Our Tale)" – Muses, Ensemble
- "A Star Is Born" – Muses, Hercules, Meg, Phil, Bob, Charles, Ensemble

== Reception ==
The world premiere production has garnered mixed reviews from critics, with many praising the cast, music, story, and production value. Thom Geier, of TheWrap, praised the production, saying it "works better than bigger-budgeted recent efforts like Frozen". Jessica Derschowits, of Entertainment Weekly, welcomed the "lively but low-key production that feels in many ways like the polar opposite of Disney's string of megawatt Broadway hits — which is a big part of its charm". Jesse Green, of The New York Times, gave a positive review by commenting on the "shrewd casting and amateur performers joining professionals onstage, a middling 1997 animated Disney musical becomes a pageant of civic engagement". Matt Windman, of AM New York Metro, gave a mixed review by commenting on "the lighthearted tone of the film, Kristoffer Diaz's new book features countless zingers and inside jokes. Diaz also tries to deliver an underlying moral on the difference between being a hero and a celebrity. However, Diaz may have gone too far in changing around some of the original sequencing, which has made the second half of the show very messy".

== Recordings ==
An original London cast album was released digitally on October 10, 2025, and physically on November 21, 2025.
