= Stephen Carlile =

British actor (born 1978)

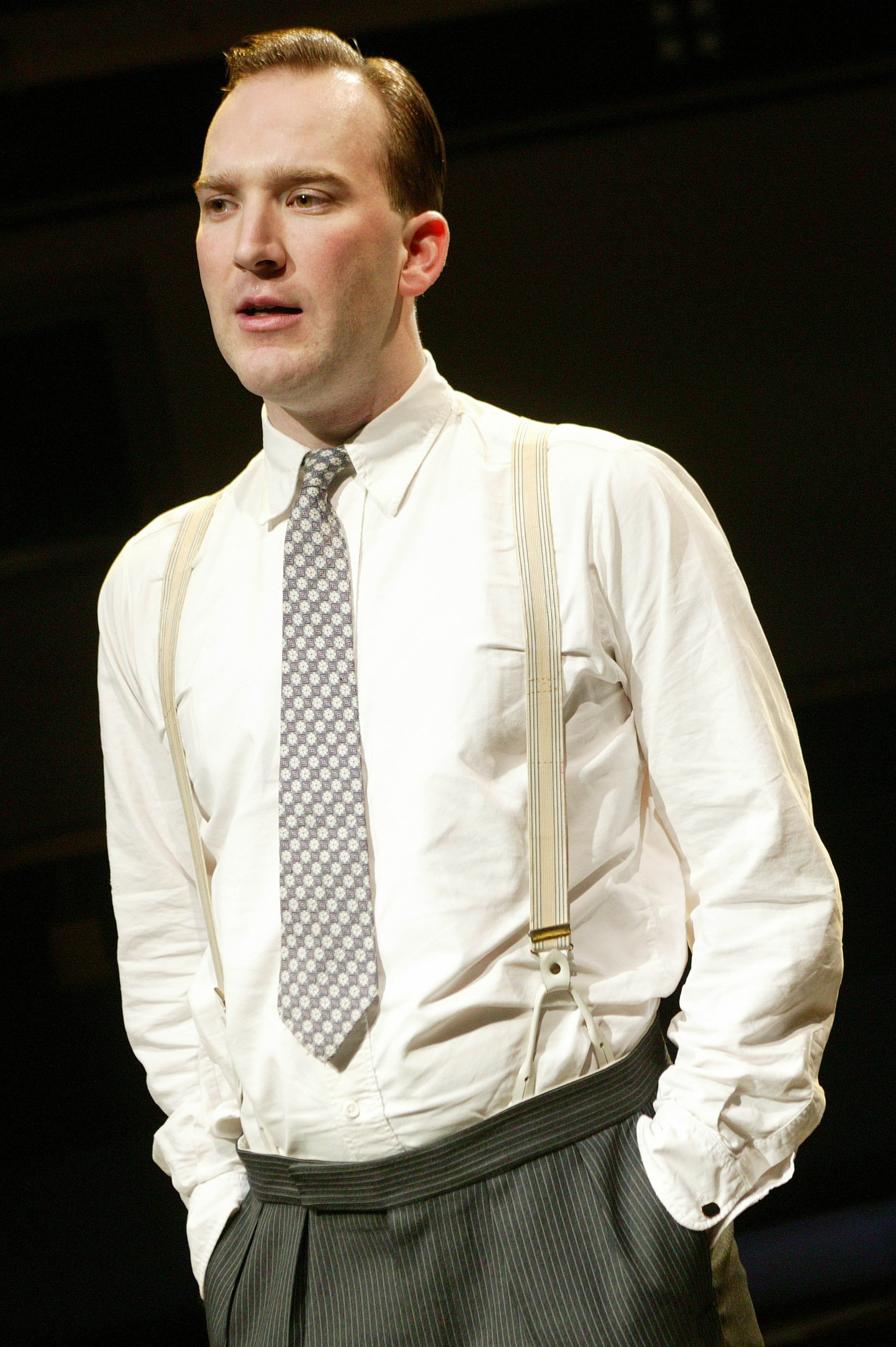
- Stephen Carlile in Next Door's Baby
- Born: 19 April 1978 (age 48); Bath, Somerset, England, UK
- Education: Guildford School of Acting
- Occupation: Actor
- Years active: 2003–present

Stephen Carlile (born 19 April 1978) is a British actor well known for starring as the villain Scar in the Broadway musical adaptation of the Disney film The Lion King and for originating the role of Hades in the West End production of Hercules.

== Early life ==
Born in Bath, Somerset, England, Carlile was trained in acting at the Guildford School of Acting.

== Career ==
Carlile has performed in many theatre works including the Broadway production of The Lion King as Scar, Noël (National Opera House in Ireland), the West End production of The Go-Between as Viscount Trimingham, as Captain Hook in the US national tour of Peter Pan 360, as Agustín Magaldi in Evita, lead tenor singing Springtime for Hitler in the West End production of The Producers, Peter Pan as Smee, The Wizard of Oz, My Fair Lady as Freddy Eynsford-Hill, Next Door's Baby as Dickie O' Brien, The Pirates of Penzance as Frederic, Space Family Robinson and The Phantom of the Opera. In 2025, Carlile originated the role of Hades in the West End production of Hercules.

Carlile has featured in several radio plays including Doctor Who, Songs from Jesus Christ Superstar and Vanity Fair.

Carlile also appeared in the 2008 film Brideshead Revisited.

== Theatre credits ==
- The Lion King (Minskoff Theatre)
- Noël (National Opera House)
- The Go-Between (Apollo Theatre)
- Peter Pan: A Musical Adventure (Birmingham Repertory Theatre)
- Peter Pan 360 (US Tour)
- Bridget Jones' Diary (Working Title workshop)
- Evita (European Tour)
- Twelfth Night (Creation Theatre Company)
- The Wizard of Oz (New Vic Theatre)
- Next Door's Baby (Orange Tree Theatre)
- Park Avenue (Sadler's Wells Theatre)
- By Jeeves (Eastbourne tour)
- My Fair Lady (Royal National Theatre)
- The Producers (Theatre Royal, Drury Lane)
- The Importance of Being Earnest (Jermyn Street)
- The Lion King (European Tour)
- The Pirates of Penzance (Orange Tree Theatre)
- The Phantom of the Opera (Her Majesty's Theatre)
- Over My Shoulder (Yvonne Arnaud Theatre, Guildford tour)
- Snoopy! The Musical (Jermyn Street Theatre)
- Coward in Concert (Covent Garden)
- Space Family Robinson (The Pleasance)
- Hercules (Theatre Royal, Drury Lane)
- Nero (Southwark Playhouse Elephant)
