= Scar (The Lion King) =

Fictional character from The Lion King

- The Lion King character
- First appearance: The Lion King (1994)
- Created by: Irene Mecchi; Jonathan Roberts; Linda Woolverton
- Voiced by: Jeremy Irons (1994 film; and Once Upon a Studio); Jim Cummings (1994 film, singing double; The Lion King II: Simba's Pride, speaking; and The Lion King: Simba's Mighty Adventure); James Horan (Kingdom Hearts II, Disney Dreamlight Valley; and Sorcerers of the Magic Kingdom); David Oyelowo (The Lion Guard); Chiwetel Ejiofor (2019 film); Kelvin Harrison Jr. (Mufasa: The Lion King); Theo Somolu (cub, Mufasa: The Lion King)
- Inspired by: King Claudius

In-universe information
- Full name: Taka (in Six New Adventures and Mufasa: The Lion King)
- Nickname: Scar
- Species: Lion
- Title(s): King of the Pride Lands; Heir to the Throne of the Pride Lands (formerly); Leader of the Lion Guard (formerly)
- Family: Mufasa (older brother); Ahadi (father; in Six New Adventures); Uru (mother; in Six New Adventures); Mohatu (grandfather; in The Brightest Star); Eshe (mother; in Mufasa: The Lion King); Obasi (father; in Mufasa: The Lion King)
- Relatives: Sarabi (sister-in-law); Simba (nephew); Nala (niece-in-law); Kopa (grandnephew; in Six New Adventures); Kiara (grandniece); Kion (grandnephew); Kovu (surrogate son and grandnephew-in-law); Rani (grandniece-in-law)

Scar is a fictional character and the main antagonist of Disney's The Lion King franchise. He is introduced in the 1994 animated film as the younger, envious brother of Mufasa, the ruler of the Pride Lands. Originally first in line to the throne, Scar is abruptly replaced by Mufasa's newborn son, Simba. Enraged, he devises a plot to usurp the throne by leading an army of hyenas and betraying both Mufasa and Simba. After killing Mufasa, Scar manipulates Simba into believing he is to blame, prompting Simba to flee into exile.

Created by screenwriters Irene Mecchi, Jonathan Roberts, and Linda Woolverton, and animated by Andreas Deja, Scar is loosely based on King Claudius, the main antagonist in William Shakespeare's Hamlet. His villainy was further inspired by German dictator Adolf Hitler, as well as by lions' natural behavior of pride takeovers. As the character's supervising animator, Deja modeled Scar's appearance on the original voice actor Jeremy Irons, drawing particularly from Irons's performance as Claus von Bülow in Reversal of Fortune. Chiwetel Ejiofor voices the photorealistic version of Scar in the 2019 remake, while Kelvin Harrison Jr. portrays the character in Mufasa: The Lion King.

As a character, Scar has garnered widespread acclaim from film critics, with Irons's vocal performance receiving much praise. However, his violence, dark color palette and allegedly effeminate mannerisms initially sparked mild controversy. Nevertheless, Scar remains celebrated as one of Disney's greatest villains by various media outlets—topping HuffPost's list and ranking within the top ten of similar lists published by Yahoo! Movies, the Orlando Sentinel, E! and CNN. He has also been recognized among the greatest villains in film history by Digital Spy and Entertainment Weekly.

== Development ==
=== Conception and influences ===
The Lion King was first conceived in 1988. The film was eventually pitched to Disney executives, one of whom was among the first to observe similarities between author Thomas M. Disch's treatment and William Shakespeare's play Hamlet. Although first citing these similarities as initially unintentional, director Rob Minkoff always felt it was essential "to anchor [the film] with something familiar." As directors, Minkoff and Roger Allers aspired to create "an animal picture based in a more natural setting," describing the film as "More true-life adventure than mythical epic." Although not the first Disney film to have been inspired by Shakespeare's work, The Lion King remains the studio's most prominent example, due to close parallels between its characters and Hamlet, while both stories revolve around main characters who struggle to come to terms with the reality that they must confront their treacherous uncles and avenge their fathers' deaths. Scar is based on King Claudius. According to Slate, while Claudius is mostly "a second-rate schemer, consumed by anxiety and guilt," Scar very much "delight[s] in his monstrosity;" both characters are motivated by jealousy. Meanwhile, The Week observed that although both characters ultimately die, Claudius is killed by protagonist, Prince Hamlet, while Scar dies "at the hand of his former hyena minions, and not Simba, himself." Additionally, the character shares similarities with Iago from Shakespeare's play Othello, as both antagonists are skilled in exploiting their victims' fears.

The original plot of The Lion King revolved around a rivalry between lions and baboons. A baboon himself, Scar was their leader. After this plot was abandoned, Scar was re-written into a rogue lion with no blood relation to Mufasa and Simba. Without a pride of his own, he simply wanted what Mufasa had. The writers eventually decided that making Scar and Mufasa brothers would make the film more interesting. At one point, Scar owned a pet python as a sidekick, but this character was abandoned. Because the film was originally intended to be much more adult-oriented, Scar was to have become infatuated with Simba's childhood friend and eventual love interest, Nala, wanting the young lioness to rule alongside him as his queen, and consequentially banishing the character when she refuses. This concept was to have been further explored during a reprise of Scar's song "Be Prepared", but both the idea and the song were ultimately removed from the film, because they were deemed too "creepy." In addition to that, there was a scene in which Scar was originally going to defeat Simba and throw him off Pride Rock, before he is engulfed by flames. This ending was cut for being far too dark for young viewers. To further emphasize the character's villainy and tyranny, the writers loosely based Scar on Adolf Hitler. According to The Jerusalem Post, Scar's song "Be Prepared" "features goose-stepping hyenas in a formation reminiscent of a Nuremberg rally." This idea was first suggested by story artist Jorgen Klubien.

According to the directors, "[a] patronizing quality" was vital to Scar's role in the film. Minkoff told the Los Angeles Times, "When Scar puts the guilt trip on Simba, that's an intense idea and probably something that is not typical of the other Disney pictures, in terms of what the villain does." Additionally, Scar serves as a departure from previous Disney Villains, because they "came off at least as buffoonish as they were sinister". Because Scar is the film's main antagonist, supervising animator Andreas Deja believed that "villains work really well when they're subtle," explaining, "to see them think and scheme and plot is much more interesting than showing them beating somebody up." By blaming Mufasa's death on an innocent Simba, Scar ultimately triggers "a cycle of guilt, flight, denial and redemption, as the hero goes into self-imposed exile, before finally reconciling with his father's memory, returning to face his wicked uncle and generally coming of age." The character's first line in The Lion King "essentially summarizes the entire film, providing foreshadowing". It reads, "Life's not fair is it? You see I—well, I shall never be King. And you shall never see light of another day. Adieu," which subtly reveals the plot, as well as "the reason why [Scar] decides to murder his own brother." (This line is given minor edits for the 2019 remake: "Life's not fair. Is it, my little friend? While some are born to feast, others spend their lives in the dark, begging for scraps. The way I see it, you and I are exactly the same: we both want to find a way out.").

=== Voice ===
==== 1994 incarnation ====
Ian McKellen, Patrick Stewart, Malcolm McDowell, Alan Rickman and Tim Curry were all originally considered for the role of Scar. However, the actor ultimately chosen for the role was Jeremy Irons, because of his classical theatre training, because the directors had deliberately wanted Scar "to come across as a Shakespearean character." Successfully recruiting Irons for the film was considered an unprecedented achievement for the studio because, at the time, it was rare for a dramatic actor of Irons's caliber to agree to voice an animated character, especially immediately after winning an Academy Award. Irons nearly declined, because, in fear of jeopardizing his successful career, he was "[h]esitant to jump from a dramatic role to an animated feature." Prior to The Lion King, Irons was famous for starring as several villains and antagonists in live action films "geared towards adults." Although he had starred in a children's film before, the actor admitted that it did not mirror the success of The Lion King, a film that has since gained notoriety for its cast of well known, award-winning actors, which animation historian Jerry Beck referred to in his book The Animated Movie Guide as "the most impressive list of actors ever to grace an animated film."

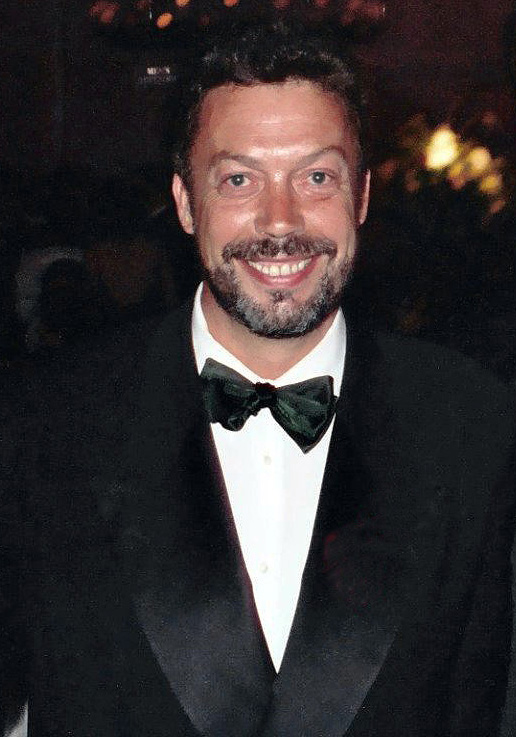
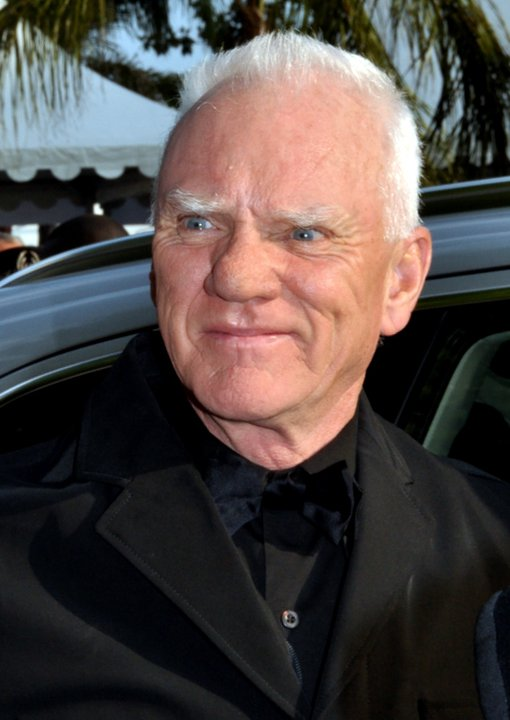
Actors Tim Curry (left) and Malcolm McDowell (right) were both considered for the role of Scar. Ultimately, the role went to then-recent Academy Award-winner Jeremy Irons.

As directors, Minkoff and Allers "work[ed] very closely with the actors to create their performance." Describing Irons as "a gentleman and a brilliant actor," Allers revealed that the actor was constantly offering "extra interpretations of lines which were fantastic." Producer Don Hahn recalled that Irons "really wanted to play with the words and the pacing," specifically referring to a scene in which Scar coaxes Simba onto a rock and tricks the cub to stay there and await his father's arrival, dubbing it "a father and son thing." According to Hahn, "The comedy in [Irons's] inflection comes from Scar sounding so disdainful he can barely summon the will to finish the sentence." Irons's physical appearance and mannerisms served as inspiration for Scar's supervising animator Andreas Deja, namely his flicking his paw in disgust. Critics have cited physical similarities between Irons and Scar.

In a reference to the role that earned Irons an Academy Award, Claus von Bülow in Reversal of Fortune, the writers gave Scar one of von Bülow's lines, "You have no idea," which is uttered by Irons in a similar tone. According to author Rachel Stein of New Perspectives on Environmental Justice: Gender, Sexuality, and Activism, Irons relies "on his history of playing sexually perverse, socially dangerous male characters to animate his depiction of Scar." On the contrary, Irons revealed to Savannah, Georgia that the similarities between the voices of Scar and von Bülow were largely unintentional, explaining, "Whatever voice came was arrived at by looking at the initial sketches and from the freedom the directors gave me to try anything." Irons concluded, "The fact that he may occasionally remind you of Claus, comes from the fact that they both share the same voice box."

While recording Scar's song, "Be Prepared," Irons encountered challenges with his singing voice. The actor reportedly "blew out his voice" upon belting the line "you won't get a sniff without me," rendering him incapable of completing the musical number. Consequently, Disney was forced to recruit American voice actor Jim Cummings, who had also been providing the voice of The Lion King's laughing hyena Ed at the time, to impersonate Irons and record the rest of the song. On May 25th, 2024, Jeremy Irons performed "Be Prepared" live for the 30th anniversary of The Lion King at the Hollywood Bowl. Jim Cummings told HuffPost that "[s]tunt singing" is actually something the actor continues to do regularly, having done the same for American actor Russell Means, voice of the Chief Powhatan in Disney's Pocahontas. Critics observed that Irons "fakes his way through 'Be Prepared' in the grand tradition of talk-singing," drawing similarities between him and American actor James Cagney and English actor Rex Harrison. Deja revealed that, during a recording session, Irons's stomach was grumbling. Deja joked, "The growling sound could be heard in his recording, so we had to record that part of his dialog all over again." As a result of Irons's prominent British accent, critics have compared both the actor and Scar to Shere Khan, the main antagonist of Disney's earlier film The Jungle Book, voiced by English actor George Sanders.

==== 2019 incarnation ====
Chiwetel Ejiofor was officially chosen on November 1, 2017, for the role of Scar in the 2019 photorealistic remake directed by Jon Favreau, as he had impressed Favreau, after watching his antagonistic performance as Baron Mordo in the Marvel film Doctor Strange (2016). Ejiofor said that "especially with Scar, whether it's a vocal quality that allows for a certain confidence or a certain aggression, to always know that at the end of it you're playing somebody who has the capacity to turn everything on its head in a split second with outrageous acts of violence—that can completely change the temperature of a scene". Favreau said of casting Ejiofor, "[He] is just a fantastic actor, who brings us a bit of the mid-Atlantic cadence and a new take on the character. He brings that feeling of a Shakespearean villain to bear because of his background as an actor. It's wonderful when you have somebody as experienced and seasoned as Chiwetel; he just breathes such wonderful life into this character." When Jeremy Irons was interviewed on Larry King Now on November 30, 2016, he expressed interest in reprising the role.

In August 2021, it was announced that Kelvin Harrison Jr. would voice a young Scar (referred to by his born name "Taka") in Barry Jenkins' 2024 prequel and sequel of the remake, Mufasa: The Lion King.

=== Design and characterization ===
The studio originally dismissed The Lion King as a risk, because, at the time, it was believed that the greatest films starred people. Concerned about the novelty of the film, Disney chairman Jeffrey Katzenberg decided to divide the studio into two separate animated films, The Lion King and Pocahontas, the latter of which was dubbed "the home run" because it was expected to be the more successful of the two projects. Disney's more seasoned and experienced animators gravitated towards Pocahontas, while the studio's newer animators were relegated to working on The Lion King, dubbing themselves the "B-team." However, Allers received Katzenberg's decision as an opportunity for "newer animators to step up to leadership roles", among them Andreas Deja, who became Scar's supervising animator. Well-known for animating several Disney villains, Deja summarized the experience as "more fun than drawing heroes" because "You have so much more to work with, in terms of expressions and acting and drawing-wise, than you would have with a nice princess or a prince, where you have to be ever so careful with the draftsmanship."

"[A]t Disney ... the people responsible for each movie see that you are good at animating a specific type of character, they will keep giving similar characters to you. Also, I animated a couple of those villains because I asked to. I told the studio that I could do something good with these characters, since they really spoke to me. I showed that I had a passion for it, which I believe to be very important. Villains are very interesting characters, they have the most 'juice' in them, and they invite you to explore them. So, if something fascinates you, then you should probably explore it."
— Supervising animator Andreas Deja on animating Disney villains

Before becoming involved with The Lion King, Deja had already developed a reputation for animating Disney villains. Prior to animating Scar, Deja had just recently served as the supervising animator of Gaston and Jafar, the villains in Disney's Beauty and the Beast and Aladdin, respectively. Initially, Deja had been considering the idea of animating a hero for a change, contemplating taking on the task of animating Simba, instead. However, Deja relented upon learning that Scar would be voiced by Irons, feeling that it would be "fun" to animate a character voiced by such a prestigious actor. Meanwhile, Minkoff and Allers had already had Deja in mind for animating Scar, long before the animator approached the directors about the position. The level anthropomorphism used in The Lion King exceeded that of any Disney animated film by which it was preceded. Because Scar is an animal, as opposed to a human, Deja and the animators faced certain challenges and limitations when it came to instilling movement in the character, and thus experimented with manipulating Scar's facial expressions, specifically the way in which he tilts his head condescendingly, raises his eyebrows and lifts his chin. The animals were each drawn with certain human-like attributes and characteristics, in order to help convey emotions and tell the story. Meanwhile, the studio recruited live lions for the animators to study, while drawing. As the film's villain, Scar is the only lion drawn with claws.

Owen Gleiberman of Entertainment Weekly described Scar as "a figure of both pity and evil, and of treacherous comedy" with Irons "filling this devious coward with elegantly witty self-loathing." As an animator, Deja believes that "If you have a great voice to work with, your work is half done." Enjoying the way in which Irons "has a way with words and phrasing," Deja deliberately based much of Scar's appearance on the actor himself, specifically the shape of his mouth and facial expressions. Several of the actor's physical attributes were incorporated into Scar's design, with Irons admitting to recognizing his own baggy eyes in his character. Additionally, Deja studied Irons's performances in the films Reversal of Fortune and Damage, for inspiration.

=== Music ===
Scar sings the musical number "Be Prepared," written by songwriters Elton John and Tim Rice, while contemplating Mufasa's death plot and bringing the hyenas along. Described as the film's "darkest" song, a "pompous," "fascistic paean to usurpers," the musical sequence depicts the lion "as a big-cat fascist." According to Business Insider, in addition to loosely basing the character on Adolf Hitler, to further emphasize Scar's tyranny, the filmmakers directly based his song "Be Prepared," which references Nazism by having Scar's army of hyenas goose step, while addressing them from a high ledge, similar to the way in which Hitler would have from a balcony, in the Nazi propaganda film Triumph of the Will (1935), which documents Nazi Germany during 1934.

According to Entertainment Weekly, the concept originated from a sketch by story artist Jorgen Klubien, in which Scar was depicted as Hitler. Although hesitant that then-Disney Animation chief Jeffrey Katzenberg would approve, the filmmakers decided to pursue it, describing the sequence as a "Triumph of the Will-style mock-Nuremberg rally." The St. Louis Post-Dispatch reviewed, "those goose-stepping hyenas seem a little much in hindsight," while Film School Rejects coined it a "hellish gathering."

== Appearances ==
=== Animated films ===
==== The Lion King (1994) ====
Scar first appeared in The Lion King as the scheming younger brother of Mufasa. In the film, Scar was first in line to become king of the lion pride until his nephew Simba was born, becoming the new heir apparent. Determined to seize the throne, Scar devises a plan to kill both Simba and Mufasa. Scar's first plan was tricking Simba into going to an elephants' graveyard where his spotted hyena minions, Shenzi, Banzai and Ed, were to kill Simba and his best friend, Nala, only for Mufasa to intervene. Next, Scar traps Simba in a gorge and orders the hyenas to trigger a wildebeest stampede. Although Mufasa saves Simba, he is unable to climb out of the gorge to safety. When Mufasa begs Scar for help, Scar instead digs his claws into his brother's paws. Mufasa realizes that Scar is responsible for the stampede and that he has been betrayed by his brother. Scar says "long live the king" before sending Mufasa to his death. Deceiving Simba into believing that he is to blame for Mufasa's death, Scar advises Simba to leave the Pride Lands and never return, then orders the hyenas to kill Simba. Scar returns to Pride Rock and tells the pride that Mufasa and Simba died in the stampede, then assumes the throne and allows the hyenas into the Pride Lands. Unbeknownst to Scar, Simba escapes the hyenas.

Years later, Scar has allowed the hyenas to wreak havoc upon the Pride Lands, which turn barren under his tyranny. He also forbids the mention of Mufasa's name in his presence. Now an adult, Simba returns to Pride Rock and witnesses Scar striking his mother, Sarabi, over the food shortage. Simba confronts Scar, who demands that Simba admit to the other lions that he is supposedly responsible for Mufasa's death. Simba does, then, as he prepares to throw Simba off Pride Rock, Scar tells Simba that he was the one who killed Mufasa, confident that the secret will die with Simba. Instead, Simba leaps up and tackles Scar, forcing Scar to confess that he killed Mufasa. A battle erupts as Simba and his friends rout the hyenas. Scar tries to flee but is cornered by Simba on the top of Pride Rock. Scar begs for mercy and attempts to blame his actions on the hyenas, unaware that they are listening nearby. Simba spares Scar on the condition that Scar permanently leaves the Pride Lands. Scar briefly pretends to do so, but then attacks Simba and they fight. Scar knocks Simba on his back, but as Scar lunges at Simba, Simba kicks him over the cliff ledge. Scar survives but is met by the hyenas, who kill and eat him for betraying them.

==== The Lion King II: Simba's Pride ====
Due to Scar's death in The Lion King, his presence in the sequel The Lion King II: Simba's Pride is limited. Scar briefly appears in a scene depicting Simba's nightmare. In the scene, Simba runs down a cliff, attempting to rescue his father from a stampede. Scar appears and transforms into Kovu, Scar's chosen heir, who throws Simba off the cliff.

Scar makes another brief appearance as Kovu's reflection in a pool of water after Kovu is exiled from the Pride Lands.

==== The Lion King 1½ ====
In The Lion King 1½, Scar appears in parts of the climax that overlap with the original film, but only from a distance.

=== Animated series ===
==== The Lion King's Timon & Pumbaa ====
Despite his death in the original film, Scar makes a few brief, non-speaking appearances in the spin-off television series Timon & Pumbaa. He is seen in the season two episode "Zazu's Off-By-One Day" when Zazu cleans out his trash can in search for the jungle inspector, and the animated wraparound segment in the Around the World with Timon & Pumbaa international video when Timon drags him to try to restore Pumbaa's lost memories.

==== The Lion Guard ====
Scar is portrayed in paintings throughout season one of The Lion Guard television series, which expand on his backstory. When Scar was young, he led the Lion Guard, a traditional duty of the king's second child. In this role, Scar protected the Pride Lands and defended the "Circle of Life" from all enemies. Scar also had an ability called the Roar of the Elders, which summons the lions of the Pride Lands' past to roar with the lion using the ability. This power convinced Scar he should be the king instead of Mufasa. When his fellow Lion Guard members refused to help him dethrone Mufasa, Scar killed them using the Roar of the Elders. As a result, Scar was stripped of this ability, as he used it against its intended purpose.

Scar appears as a fiery spirit in a volcano in season two (voiced by David Oyelowo) starting in the episode The Rise of Scar. In this episode, Kion, the current leader of the Lion Guard, uses the Roar of the Elders after Janja the hyena provokes him, and unknowingly summons Scar. Scar conspires with Janja and the other animals in the Outlands to take over the Pride Lands and defeat Simba and the new Lion Guard.

Later in the season, the Lion Guard discovers that Scar has returned. Scar's army begins conquering various locations in the Pride Lands, causing unrest, until the Lion Guard trains the residents of the Pride Lands into a militia.

In season three's one-hour premiere Battle for the Pride Lands, Scar battles the Lion Guard. He attempts to burn down Pride Rock and to kill Janja and his clan along for being tempted to defect. At the end of the episode, Kion defeats Scar by summoning the Great Kings of the Past to punish Scar for his actions. This results in Scar's evaporation.

In a flashback during the season three premiere, it is revealed that as an adolescent, Scar met a rogue lion who had offered his help in overthrowing Mufasa. The rogue's cobra companion bit Scar on the eye, poisoning him and leaving a scar. Scar used the Roar of the Lion to throw the rogue lion and the cobra to their deaths in lava. This gradually increased Scar's jealousy of Mufasa, who gave his brother the nickname "Scar." Scar then adopted the nickname and began plotting to personally kill his brother. Wanting Kion to share his fate, Scar instructs the cobra Ushari to give Kion a similar scar; much of season three revolves around the results of this.

=== Broadway musical ===
The success of The Lion King spawned a Broadway musical based on the film, directed by Julie Taymor with a book written by The Lion King co-director, Roger Allers and screenwriter Irene Mecchi. American actor John Vickery originated the role of Scar. During the song "The Madness of King Scar," Scar attempts to seduce a young adult Nala and make her his queen and mother of his cubs. Nala rejects Scar's advances and leaves Pride Rock.

Actors who have played the role worldwide include Gavin Lee, Stephen Carlile, Michael Hollick, Patrick Page, George Asprey and Rob Edwards, and Salvatore Antonio.

=== The Lion King remake films ===
==== The Lion King (2019) ====
In The Lion King (2019), Scar is described by his voice actor Chiwetel Ejiofor as more "psychologically possessed" and "brutalized" than in the original film. Ejiofor also said that "[Scar and Mufasa's] relationship is completely destroyed and brutalized by Scar's way of thinking. He's possessed with this disease of his own ego and his own want." Among the changes, Scar is stated to have challenged Mufasa in the past and lost (it is implied he got his scar in the fight), and that both brothers courted Sarabi, who chose Mufasa. In the 2019 film, Scar also has to earn the trust of the hyenas, whereas in the 1994 film, the hyenas were allied with Scar from the beginning. During his reign, Scar takes a more active role in hunting alongside the pack of hyenas, and is also seen trying to force Sarabi to become his mate and queen. He also restricts conversations about Mufasa, rather than banning his name entirely, as he did in the original film. Additionally, His scar also appears black instead of pink, and his general appearance is similar to that of an Asiatic lion, having a noticeably thinner mane and lighter physique.

==== Mufasa: The Lion King (2024) ====
In the prequel film, Scar is depicted in his youth under the name Taka, voiced by Kelvin Harrison Jr., with Theo Somolu voicing the cub version of the character.

The film reveals that Scar, formerly known as Taka, is not Mufasa's biological brother, but a royal cub born to King Obasi and Queen Eshe. Taka's family adopts Mufasa after the latter is separated from his parents during a flood. Although Obasi reluctantly accepts the outsider cub, he disdains Mufasa as a "stray." Taka and Mufasa nonetheless grow up together, developing a close brotherly bond.

Years later, a pride of white lions known as the Outsiders ambush the royal family. Queen Eshe is attacked, and Mufasa rushes to defend her, killing the son of Kiros, the Outsiders' leader. Instead of praising his courage, King Obasi harshly scolds Taka, ordering him to conceal his involvement in the conflict to preserve his reputation and political standing.

When word spreads that the Outsiders are preparing to retaliate, Obasi instructs his sons to flee and establish a new home for the royal bloodline. The brothers set out to find a legendary land called Milele, which Mufasa remembers from stories his parents told him before their separation. Along the way, they meet Sarabi, a wandering lioness. Taka quickly becomes enamored with her and enlists Mufasa's help in winning her affection. In an effort to support his brother, Mufasa allows Taka to take credit for saving Sarabi from an elephant stampede. Despite Taka's attempts to woo her, Sarabi gradually grows closer to Mufasa, recognizing his quiet heroism and selflessness.

This devastates Taka, who feels overshadowed and betrayed. Consumed by jealousy, he secretly conspires with Kiros, offering to lead the Outsiders to Mufasa's tracks in exchange for vengeance. When the brothers finally reach Milele, they are ambushed by Kiros and his pride. Kiros exposes Taka's betrayal, and Taka accuses Mufasa of stealing both Sarabi's love and his parents' affection.

During the ensuing battle, Mufasa is cornered and nearly killed, but a remorseful Taka intervenes to save his life. In the struggle, Kiros slashes Taka across the face, leaving a deep wound that will become his namesake scar. Taka ultimately kills Kiros, helping Mufasa and the Pride defeat the Outsiders. With the conflict resolved, Mufasa ascends as the first King of Milele, later renamed the Pride Lands. He is reunited with his mother Afia, though he learns of his father's death in the flood.

Filled with guilt, Taka begs Mufasa for forgiveness. Though Mufasa allows him to remain in the kingdom, he solemnly decrees that "Taka"—the name tainted by betrayal—shall never be spoken again. Accepting his new identity, Taka chooses to call himself "Scar", a symbol of his shame and the lessons of his past. As Mufasa climbs the newly christened Pride Rock to begin his reign, Scar lingers in the shadows, watching silently before retreating into bitterness, foreshadowing the darkness that will one day consume him.

=== Other ===
==== Books ====
===== A Tale of Two Brothers =====
Scar makes a few appearances in Six New Adventures, a book series that continued the story of the original Lion King film. Most prominently, Scar is the antagonist in A Tale of Two Brothers. In the story, Simba breaks a promise to Kopa, his son, and Rafiki warns against this, using Scar's relationship with his own father, Ahadi, as a warning. Feeling Mufasa is the favored child, Scar, then called Taka, tries to make his brother look foolish by pitting him against a Buffalo named Boma. However, the plan fails and Taka is given the name of Scar as a 'mark of shame'.

===== The Circle of Ter-Roar =====
Scar is the primary antagonist of The Circle of Ter-Roar, the seventh book of the Disney Chills series written by author Jennifer Brody under the name Vera Strange. The book was published on August 1, 2023.

The novel follows twelve-year-old Silas, whose anxiousness causes him to be bullied by his classmates. Silas' family inherits Camp Pride Rock, a safari-themed summer camp in Arizona that was previously run by his Aunt Scarlet. Upon arriving at the camp, the family find the grounds in poor condition. Inside Silas's closet is an old, mysterious trunk that contains the spirit of Camp Pride Rock—the pelt of an old lion named Scar. After opening the trunk, Silas begins to think that things are looking up for the camp and for his family, until a terrifying accident and a series of scary animal encounters change his mind.

==== Video games ====
Scar appears at the end of the 1994 video game The Lion King when Simba battles Scar.

Scar plays a similar role in the video game The Lion King: Simba's Mighty Adventure (2000), with climactic battle between Simba and Scar occurring at the end of the sixth level. The game features the voices of the original film's cast, including Jeremy Irons as Scar.

Scar, voiced by James Horan, appears as a non-player character in Disney's Extreme Skate Adventure (2003) and Kingdom Hearts II as a villain who ultimately transforms into a Heartless as a result of the character's "hatred and jealousy." Scar is a payable character to unlock for a limited time in Disney Magic Kingdoms.

Scar, again voiced by James Horan, appears in the 2023 video game Disney Dreamlight Valley as one of the inhabitants of its titular valley, with his home inside an elephant's skull in the Sunlit Plateau biome.

In the mobile game Twisted Wonderland, Scar is revered as "The King of Beasts," one of "The Great Seven," due to his ambition and tenacity. Scar is also remembered for welcoming outcasts (the hyenas) into the Pride Lands, being seen in Twisted Wonderland as magnanimous to all subjects. At the magic school Night Raven College, one of the dorms, Savanaclaw, is dedicated to him, and students sorted into this dorm are expected to reflect his spirit of "persistence".

The character Leona Kingscholar, housewarden of Savanaclaw, is the Twisted Wonderland incarnation of Scar. Similarly to Scar, Leona is a second born prince who resents his elder brother and feels he deserves to be king instead. Cementing the reference, Leona bears a vertical scar across his left eye.

Scar makes an appearance in flashback when the game's protagonist dreams of the events of the first film in Book 2.

==== Cameos ====
A lion pelt, presumably the Nemean lion's, worn by Hercules in Disney's film Hercules, has Scar's appearance. This may also be a reference to Zazu's remark in The Lion King that Scar would "make a very handsome throw rug." Scar's supervising animator Andreas Deja also served as the supervising animator for Hercules.

In Plusaversary, an installation in The Simpsons Disney+ shorts series, Scar appears as an attendee at the party in Moe's Tavern. In another The Simpsons short, Welcome to the Club, Scar appears along with other Disney villains trying to convince Lisa Simpson how fun it is to be a villain.

Scar is one of several Walt Disney Animation Studios characters to appear in the short film Once Upon a Studio, where he is again voiced by Jeremy Irons.

== Reception ==
=== Critical response ===
Scar has received widespread acclaim from film critics. In his book New York Times Essential Library: Children's Movies: A Critic's Guide to the Best Films Available on Video and DVD (2003), author Peter M. Nichols identified Scar as the film's most interesting character, describing Simba and Mufasa as "bores in comparison". Janet Maslin of The New York Times called Scar a "delectably wicked" villain and called Irons' voice acting a highlight. Leah Rozen of People described Scar as "a flawless realization of Irons's special talent". While Gene Siskel of the Chicago Tribune called Scar the film's best character, ComingSoon.net's Joshua Starnes called him "the best part of the film" and "a showcase for how to do an over-the-top villain right". Roger Ebert called Scar memorable and one of Disney's greatest animated villains, while James Berardinelli of ReelViews called him a welcome departure from "the buffoonery that has marked the recent trio" of Disney villains, specifically Ursula, Gaston, and Jafar.

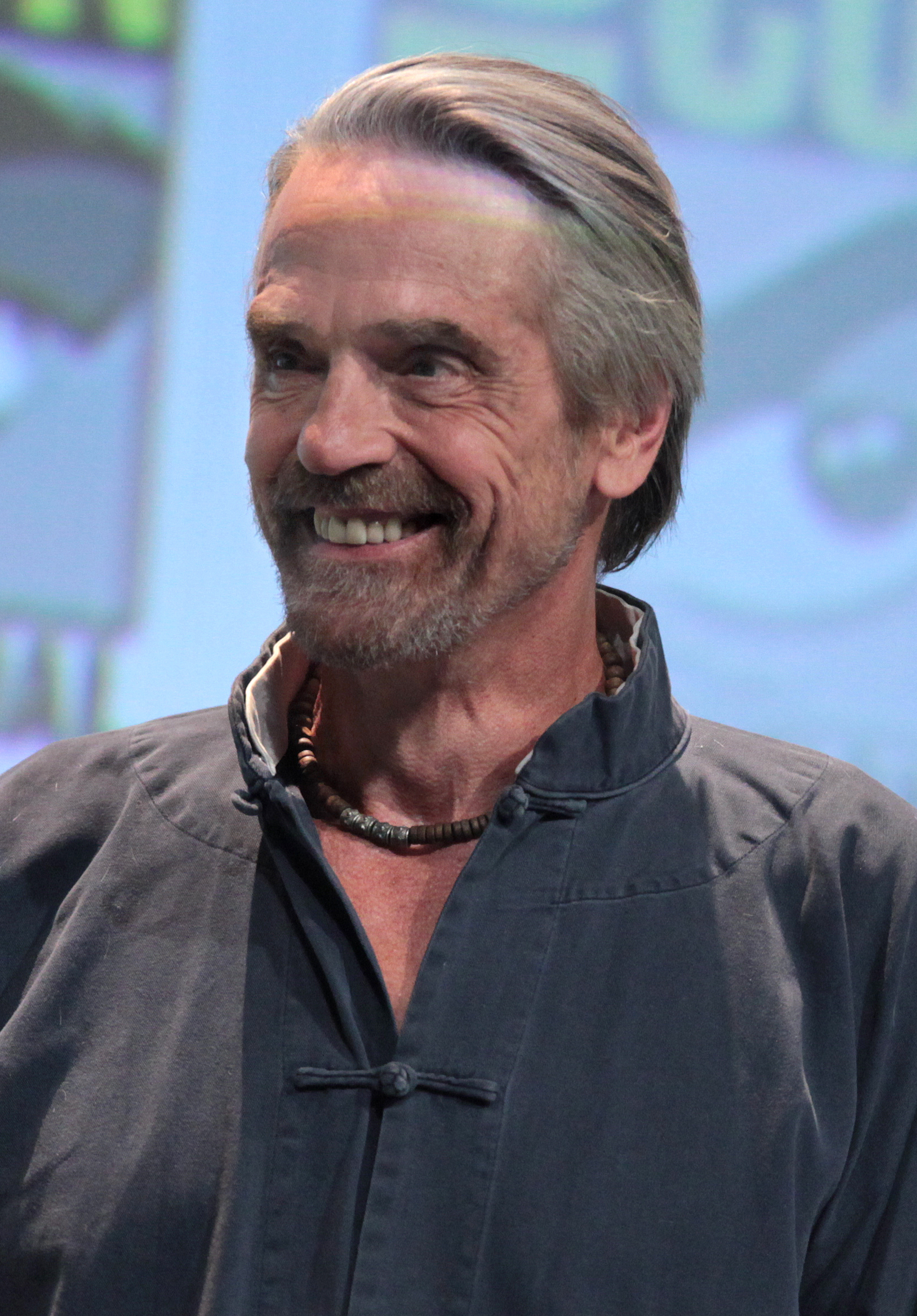
In addition to praising the character, film critics greeted Irons's vocal performance enthusiastically.

"Simba is also influenced by his delectably wicked uncle, Scar (Jeremy Irons). Scar arranges Mufasa's disturbing on-screen death in a manner that both banishes Simba to the wilderness and raises questions about whether this film really warranted a G rating ... For the grown-ups, there is Mr. Irons, who has been as devilishly well captured by Disney's graphic artists (Scar's supervising animator: Andreas Deja) as Robin Williams was in Aladdin. Bored, wicked and royally sarcastic, Mr. Irons's Scar slithers through the story in grandiose high style, with a green-eyed malevolence that is one of film's chief delights. 'Oh, and just between us, you might want to work on that little roar of yours, hmm?' he purrs to Simba, while purporting to be a mentor to his young nephew. Scar, who also gives a reprise of Mr. Irons's best-known line from Reversal of Fortune, may not be much of a father figure, but he's certainly great fun."

— Janet Maslin, The New York Times

Critics have consistently singled out Irons' performance for praise, with Desson Howe of The Washington Post, Tom Hutchinson of the Radio Times, Annette Basile of FilmInk, and Terrence Rafferty of The New Yorker each calling him a standout. Cindy White of IGN called him "deliciously smarmy". For the same publication, Andy Patrizio said Irons voices Scar "in perfect Shakespearean villain mode". Rolling Stone's Peter Travers hailed Irons for "deliver[ing] a triumphantly witty vocal performance that ranks with Robin Williams' in Aladdin". Graham Young of the Birmingham Mail and The Guardian's Philip French called the actor "magnificent" and "excellent" in the role, respectively. David Sterritt of The Christian Science Monitor exalted Irons' acting, describing him as "positively brilliant". Both the Orlando Sentinel's Jay Boyar and Mathew DeKinder of the St. Louis Post-Dispatch agreed that Irons excels in the film's dramatic moments.

Even reviewers who disliked the film overall generally complimented Scar and Irons. Television Without Pity's Ethan Alter admitted to enjoying Scar, praising the character as "a fantastic villain and easily the most fully realized of the film's characters, thanks both to Jeremy Irons' marvelously wicked vocal performance and some clever character flourishes on behalf of the animators". David Denby of New York, who otherwise criticized the film, felt that "Irons ... sounds like he's having a better time than he's ever had in movies before". In a rare lukewarm review, Anthony Quinn of The Independent found his work too campy: "more Liberace than George Sanders".

Ejiofor's characterization of Scar, while constantly compared with the original, is still generally well received. Renaldo Matadeen from CBR Exclusives praised Scar's remake incarnation as being more frightening than the original for having more motives in his action instead of a simple jealousy and how Scar is more active in leading the hyenas. Similarly, Ejiofor's performance as Scar is also praised. Owen Gleiberman from Variety praised Ejiofor's voice acting, commenting that his Scar raises the film's dramatic stakes, upping the ante on what Jeremy Irons did as Scar in the 1994 version. Scott Mendelson from Forbes comments that while he prefers Jeremy Irons's Scar, he still praised Ejiofor's performance for making Scar excellent and nuanced.

=== Criticism and controversy ===
Some critics considered The Lion King to be the studio's "darkest" film at the time of its release, and thus deemed it unprecedented, in terms of its serious themes, namely guilt, murder, treachery, revenge, and death, specifically the on-screen assassination of one of the film's heroes. Hal Hinson of The Washington Post predicted that Scar's murder of Mufasa will be the most widely debated aspect of The Lion King. Film critics and parents, alike, expressed concern that Scar's violent ways would frighten and disturb younger viewers. Referring to Scar murdering Mufasa, The New York Times questioned "whether this film really warranted a G rating." Critics also cautioned Scar's death; Movieline warned audiences that the film "shows a fairy tale's dark sense of justice," for example, when "Scar was eaten by his hyena allies, after betraying them."

"Death, something not really touched on in the last three animated Disney tales, is very much at the forefront of The Lion King. In a scene that could disturb younger viewers, Mufasa's demise is shown. It is a chilling moment that is reminiscent of a certain incident in Bambi. The film also contains a fair share of violence, including a rather graphic battle between two lions. Parents should carefully consider before automatically taking a child of, say, under seven years of age, to this movie."

— James Berardinelli, ReelViews

Some publications such as the Los Angeles Times and The Philadelphia Inquirer warned that Scar's on-screen murder of Mufasa and a violent climatic battle may disturb younger children. However, Chris Hicks of the Deseret News complained that filming Scar and Simba's final battle in slow motion undercut the serious implications of Scar's actions by making it "unintentionally comic".

Scar has generated some controversy regarding the character's appearance and personality, specifically his darker-colored fur and alleged sexuality. However, David Parkinson, author of The Rough Guide to Film Musicals, noted that the general public has remained largely oblivious to such concerns. In 1994, Steve Twomey of The Washington Post reported that a Detroit Free Press columnist felt that "Scar, clearly, is meant to represent an evil African American, because, 'while Simba's mane is gloriously red, Scar's is, of course, black". According to Talib Visram of Fast Company, some critics pointed out that "the clever, cunning Scar" speaks disparagingly in a British accent, towards hyenas who use "street vernacular", while treating them as servants.

Meanwhile, some writers have said Scar's effeminate mannerisms and voice can be perceived as perpetuating homophobic cliches and stereotypes, and has been cited as an example of queer coding villains in Disney media. Journalist Tre'vell Anderson said Scar embodies "the then-expected coded-as-gay villainy that came to define countless Disney properties. He's campy, catty, and effeminate, limp paws included -- characteristics that are stereotypically attributed to queer people", although beyond this his sexual identity "had no significant presence". Dan Hassler-Forest of The Washington Post said, "his effeminate gestures and apparent lack of interest in heterosexual reproduction mark him as queer, like Jafar, Ursula and many other villains in Disney's rigidly heterosexual world". A writer for Into said "There is much to be said about the fact that Scar's presentation can be reduced to a cowardly, gay man leading a comedic trio comprised of a Black woman, a Latino man and a mentally disabled 'liability'". Matthew Jacobs of HuffPost accused Disney of watering down Scar's personality in the 2019 remake to avoid accusations of queer coding, instead of "making Scar gay (imagine!) or else finding a unique angle on him" and establishing that Scar and Mufasa had once competed for the same mate, Sarabi. While some viewers expressed similar sentiments on social media, Anderson argued that while they understand why queer audiences would want to preserve Scar's "latent homosexuality", the author is more interested in having explicitly queer characters played by openly queer people, and therefore considers the remake's version of Scar not being subliminally gay "progress". According to Nightmare on Main Street: Angels, Sadomasochism, and the Culture of Gothic's author Mark Edmundson, the character resembles "a cultivated, world-weary, gay man". Susan Mackey-Kallis, author of The Hero and the Perennial Journey Home in American Film, observed that Scar is "more effeminate [and] less brawny ... than" both Mufasa and Simba, while Georgia Vraketta pointed out that "Even though [Scar] would be expected to mate with one of the lioness, he is never seen intimated by any". Slant Magazine explained that Scar's black mane is simply an example of "the animators' elementary attempts to color-code evil for the film's target audience". Similarly, author Edward Schiappa wrote in his book Beyond Representational Correctness: Rethinking Criticism of Popular Media that Scar's voice was simply meant "to convey the sort of upper-class snobbishness evinced by George Sanders' performance as Shere Khan in The Jungle Book".

== Cultural impact ==
According to IGN, Scar, Simba and Mufasa have since become "household names thanks to the [film's] enormous popularity". Scar is considered to be among Disney's greatest villains. Desmond Ryan of The Philadelphia Inquirer reviewed Scar as "the most vivid villain in Disney features in generations." On a broader scale, Scar is often revered as one of the greatest animated villains of all time. Entertainment Weekly included the character in the article "10 Over-the-top Animated Movie Villains", explaining, "you could only expect over-the-top when you pair such a grasping, conniving character with Jeremy Irons' seductive voice." Likewise, Digital Spy's Alex Fletcher wrote of Scar in his article "Who is Disney's greatest-ever villain?" that "The scene in which he lets Mufasa ... fall into a stampede of wildebeests left lasting emotional trauma on an entire generation."

Scar walks the fine line between gravitas and camp, and most of the credit has to go to Jeremy Irons's superb sarcastic drawl. His main complaint is simply that life isn't fair, and that his status as Mufasa's younger brother makes him ineligible to rule over Pride Rock. Anyone with siblings, royal or not, can relate on some level. And although it's honestly a little cringe-worthy to watch Scar mince his way through 'Be Prepared,' he proves himself an adept orator, inspiring legions of goose-stepping hyenas to throw off the shackles of the oppressive lions.

— Tor.com's Sarah Tolf on Scar's legacy

HuffPost ranked Scar first in its "Definitive Ranking of 25 Classic Disney Villains" countdown. Similarly, BuzzFeed also ranked Scar first in the website's "Definitive Ranking Of The Top 20 Disney Villains" list, with author Javi Moreno accusing the character of removing "the innocence of an entire generation." Scar also topped About.com's "Top 10 Disney Villains" countdown; author David Nusair concluded, "There are few figures within Disney's body of work that are as deliciously reprehensible and vile as Scar ... heightened by Jeremy Irons' gloriously smug voice work." Nusair also included Irons among the "Top 5 Celebrity Voice Performances in Animated Films", acknowledging the fact that although the actor "has played a lot of villains over the course of his career ... none have had the lasting impact as Scar from The Lion King." The Orlando Sentinel ranked Scar the "sixth-greatest Disney villain of all time". Similarly, Babble.com also placed the character at number six. Included in the website's "12 most famous Disney villains from worst to best" countdown, Yahoo! Movies ranked Scar second best, while Moviefone ranked the character sixth. E! ranked Scar fifth, with author John Boone writing that the character "plotted one of the most painful deaths in Disney history, so you know he'll never be forgotten." Animation World Network ranked Scar the sixth-best animated villain.

CNN considers Scar one of "Disney's scariest characters." While ranking the character fifth, The Stanford Daily wrote, "From his habit of sadistically toying with his prey to his dumb hyena coven to the way he leads the kingdom of Pride Rock into a period of starvation and sorrow, he's a backstabbing dictator of an uncle." Richard Crouse of Metro cited Scar's "Long live the King" as the character's "most evil line". Aside from Disney and animation, Scar is often revered as one of the greatest movie villains of all time. Digital Spy featured the character who, according to author Simon Reynolds, "underlined the sheer blackness of his heart by ruthlessly killing Simba's father," among the "25 greatest movie villains". Similarly, Entertainment Weekly ranked the character the "twenty-fifth-most vile movie villain" ever, while Total Film ranked Scar sixty-seventh.

Deja remains best known for animating several of Disney's most famous villains, admitting to preferring animating villains over heroes. However, after The Lion King, Deja finally decided to take a break from animating villains in order to avoid repeating himself, subsequently refusing to animate villain Judge Claude Frollo in The Hunchback of Notre Dame in favor of working on Hercules from Hercules, along with Mickey Mouse in the animated short Runaway Brain. Comparing Scar to other villains that he has played, Irons said that he "measures very highly," having "charm," "Machiavellian qualities" and being "iconic in some of the things he says."
