= List of Disney's Hercules characters =

The main characters in the franchise. From top to bottom: Pegasus, Hercules and Phil, Panic and Pain, Meg, and Hades.

The following are fictional characters from Disney's franchise Hercules, which includes its 1997 animated film and its derived TV series. These productions are adaptations of Greek mythology, and as such, differ greatly from the classical versions.

== Hercules ==
Hercules
- First appearance: Hercules (1997)
- Based on: Heracles (Hercules)
- Voiced by: Josh Keaton (young Hercules in the 1997 film and Kingdom Hearts Birth by Sleep); Tate Donovan (adult Hercules in most appearances; young Hercules in Hercules: The Animated Series); Roger Bart (singing); Sean Astin (adult Hercules in Kingdom Hearts)

In-universe information
- Nicknames: Wonder Boy (by Meg); Herc
- Species: Humanoid demigod
- Gender: Male
- Relatives: Zeus (biological father); Hera (biological mother); Amphitryon (adoptive father); Alcmene (adoptive mother)
- Origin: Mount Olympus
- Nationality: Greek
- Abilities: Super strength

Hercules is the titular character of the franchise, who is based on the mythological Heracles, commonly referred to by the Roman spelling, Hercules. In the 1997 animated film, Josh Keaton voices Hercules as a teenager, Tate Donovan voices him as an adult, and Roger Bart provides his singing voice in "Go the Distance". He is a young man with orange hair and eyebrows and blue eyes. Young Hercules wears a one-sleeved Greek tunic with brown sandals. As a teenager, Hercules is a country boy depicted as tall and thin, with exaggerated proportions, such as a staggering pigeon-toed stance. After completing his hero training, Hercules physically changes from being slender to being top-heavy and muscular, having larger biceps and pectorals and a thicker neck, as well as a more confident stance. However, Hercules still retains some of his teenage flaws, such as being shy, awkward, clumsy and inept with a lack of coordination, occasionally taking a stance that is pigeon-toed or staggering as well as an instinctive reaction to scream loudly or run away. As a hero, Hercules wears a brown-orange brass Cuirass-like tank armor tunic with brown wristbands, matching warrior sandals, and a blue cape.

In creating the design for the infant version of Hercules used in the 1997 film, animator Randy Haycock drew inspiration by videotaping a friend's six-month-old and by renting films with babies in them, while the curly hairstyle for baby Hercules was derived from the appearance of Haycock's infant daughter. He stated that "Hercules' mannerisms come right off things I've picked up from her", even though Hercules is more caricatured than a real baby. The inspiration for teenage Hercules came from Haycock's experiences as an adolescent: he stated that "I was too tall and skinny for my age, and I was a lousy athlete. At home I broke just about everything..". Teenage Hercules has big hands and feet that the animator remembers having himself, as well as a lack of coordination. Andreas Deja was supervising animator for the adult version of Hercules. He studied photographs of Olympic athletes, specifically swimmers, who have long necks and natural musculature. He wanted to emulate the Greek tradition of character drawing, which he explains means "straight nose, pursed lips – almost cherubic, large eyes, a lidded look...The classic style you find on Greek vases or drawings".

=== In Hercules ===
In the original film, Hercules is born on Mount Olympus as a god and son of Zeus and Hera. However, Hercules' evil uncle Hades, who wants to take control of Olympus and the world, along with all of creation, is enraged at this. Knowing that, as a god, Hercules is immortal and invulnerable to harm, Hades sends his lackeys Pain and Panic to kidnap Hercules and turn him mortal using a magic potion. However, the arrival of two mortals, Amphitryon and Alcmene, causes Hercules to miss the final drop of the potion, causing him to retain his superhuman strength despite becoming mortal. The couple then adopts the child, considering his arrival a gift from the gods since they are childless. Zeus and the other gods discover the kidnapping too late, and because Hercules is now mortal, he cannot return to Mount Olympus.

Over the years, Hercules is raised as a farmer until his awkward teenage years where he is unable to control his godlike strength and struggles to be accepted by others, which worsens when the teenager's clumsiness and uncoordinated strength leads to him accidentally destroying a marketplace. Shortly afterward, Amphitryon and Alcmene inform Hercules that he is adopted, inspiring him to visit the temple of Zeus, where he learns of his godhood. Zeus tells Hercules that he must prove himself a true hero and instructs him to find the trainer of heroes Philoctetes (or "Phil"), while giving him the winged horse Pegasus to assist him in his journey. Phil initially declines returning to the hero training business, unconvinced that Hercules was the son of Zeus, but is convinced after Zeus strikes him with lightning. Having reached adulthood and passed his training, Hercules sets off with Phil to become a hero in Thebes. Along the way, Hercules saves a "damsel in distress" named Meg from Nessus, a centaur acting as the river guardian, and though Meg doesn't believe Hercules' "innocent farm-boy routine" he falls in love with her. Unbeknownst to Hercules, Meg is working unwillingly for Hades and relates the events to him; through this, Hades learns that Hercules is still alive and plots again to kill him at the start of his career. Meanwhile, Hercules arrives in Thebes and announces himself as a hero, only for the Thebans to dismiss the young man as an amateur and refuse to give him a chance to prove himself. Meg appears and lures Hercules to a rocky canyon outside of town, where he saves two boys, who are actually Pain and Panic in disguise, trapped in a cave. As an unimpressed crowd of Thebans watch Hercules rescue the trapped boys, the young hero also inadvertently releases a giant serpent-like creature, the Hydra, and bravely faces the monster with just a sword and his wits. Although he struggles in the fight, in which the beast initially swallows him whole, he cuts his way out by decapitation. However, Hercules is forced on the defensive, flying around on Pegasus as the Hydra's heads multiply and grows three heads every time one is cut off, the snarling heads overwhelming him until he smashes his fists into the mountainside, causing an avalanche that buries the multi-headed monster under a mountain of rocks. His victory earns him newfound fame and adoration from the citizens of Thebes as well as the anger of Hades. After defeating the Hydra, Hercules continues his heroics and becomes famous throughout Greece. Upon meeting with Zeus, Hercules believes himself ready to rejoin the gods, but Zeus tells him that his celebrity status is not enough to regain his immortality, as being famous is not the same as being a "true hero". However, he cannot tell Hercules what that means, as he must figure it out himself and "look inside his heart". Later on, Meg convinces Hercules to play hookie and on a date. At first, she was trying to learn his weaknesses, but she eventually fell in love with him. However, Phil ends the date, being enraged at Hercules for skipping training. He leaves to tell Hercules of Meg's association with Hades, but does not hear her refusal to help destroy Hercules. Hercules, ecstatic from the date, refuses to believe Phil's warning about Meg, prompting Phil to quit.

Hades, realizing that Meg is Hercules' weakness, confronts Hercules and offers him a deal: he will ensure Meg's safety if he gives up his strength for 24 hours. Hercules is reluctant to see anyone hurt, but ultimately agrees, and Hades takes the opportunity to humiliate him before revealing Meg's role in his scheme. Enacting his plan, Hades sends a Cyclops to destroy Hercules. Without his superhuman strength and crushed by Meg's betrayal, Hercules struggles to fight the monster until Meg convinces Phil to return and help Hercules. The monster's fall causes a pillar to topple towards Hercules; Meg pushes him out of the way and takes the impact of the pillar. This causes Hercules to regain his strength because Hades' end of the bargain is now broken, as he promised that Meg would not be hurt. Hercules leaves Meg in the care of his friends while he rushes off to thwart Hades' invasion of Olympus. After freeing the captured gods and helping to defeat three of the Titans, he returns to Meg only to learn that her injuries were fatal. He then travels to the Underworld to rescue her spirit from the River Styx, which ages mortals upon contact. Hercules enters the pool to rescue Meg's soul. He is able to reach Meg before he dies, with his selfless act fulfilling the requirement for being a true hero, thus regaining his godhood. He then punches Hades into the River Styx and returns Meg's soul to her body. He is invited by Zeus to live on Olympus, but decides to live life on Earth with Meg and becomes a demigod once more.

=== In television series ===
The 1998 TV series Hercules: The Animated Series follows Hercules' adventures as a teenager before the main of the film, with Tate Donovan reprising his role. The series takes places during the years he spent training to be a hero under the tutelage of Phil before his "Zero to Hero" transformation; he is referred to as a "demigod" throughout the series. Young Hercules is a hero-in-training enrolled at Prometheus Academy, a high school for both gods and mortals. He is joined by two new friends, Icarus and Cassandra. Many of the Olympian deities pay visits to him and either help or hinder him in his adventures.

Hercules also appears in the television series House of Mouse, in the Walt Disney World version of Fantasmic!, occasionally at the Walt Disney Parks and Resorts for greetings in the Long Lost Friends area, and in Fantasyland. Hercules also had his own stage show on the Disney Cruise Line. Hercules is a playable character who is available to unlock for a limited time in Disney Magic Kingdoms.

An iteration of Hercules appears in the Once Upon a Time episode "Labor of Love", portrayed by Jonathan Whitesell.

=== In video games ===
Hercules appears in the Kingdom Hearts series, in which the Hercules-themed world Olympus Coliseum regularly appears. In the series, Sora helps Hercules defeat Hades, who has joined Maleficent's group of villains and still seeks to take over Olympus. In English, he is voiced by Sean Astin in the first game, with Tate Donovan reprising his role in later games as well as Josh Keaton as younger Hercules in the prequel Kingdom Hearts Birth by Sleep. In Japanese, he is voiced by Yasunori Matsumoto, with Masakazu Suzuki voicing younger Hercules in Birth by Sleep.

== Meg ==
Megara, commonly shortened to Meg, is a slave who used to work for Hades, the Lord of the Underworld. In all English-language media, she is voiced by Susan Egan. Meg is loosely based on the mythological Megara, the first wife of Hercules in mythology, as well as Deianira, who in Greek mythology was the third wife of Hercules. Meg has fair skin and waist-length dark auburn hair which is worn in a ponytail, and wears a Grecian-style dress. She also wears a dark purple loose-sash around her waist. Sometime during the events of Hercules, Meg sold her soul to Hades to revive her deceased lover. Hades agreed on the condition that she serve him, which she accepted. However, shortly after her lover was revived, he fell in love with someone else and left Meg locked in servitude to Hades. While Meg follows Hades' orders, she occasionally shows open defiance to him.

Meg first appears on screen while trying to convince the centaur Nessus to join Hades' forces, only to have him attempt to seduce her. Hercules intervenes, believing Meg to be a "damsel in distress" and defeating Nessus in a fight, then falls in love with her in the process, which Hades plans to use to his advantage. Later in Thebes, Meg lures Hercules to a battle with the Hydra, whom he defeats. After Hercules achieves several more victories, Hades offers Meg freedom in exchange for discovering Hercules' weakness. However, Meg develops feelings for Hercules instead. Eventually, Hades realizes that Meg's affection is Hercule's undoing and uses her as leverage to convince Hercules to give up his strength for one day in return for her safety; if the deal is broken, his superhuman strength returns. Hades then reveals Meg worked for him, leaving Hercules heartbroken. Meg and Phil later find Hercules battling the Cyclops; after it is defeated, she sacrifices herself to save him from a collapsing column. Hercules succeeds in reclaiming her spirit and restoring her life during his foray into the Underworld. Despite being offered the opportunity to return to Olympus as a god, he declines and opts to remain on Earth with Meg.

In Hercules: The Animated Series, Meg appears twice, once as a teenager and once as an adult. She meets Hercules and offers him the chance to prove himself as a hero, having him retrieve her the amphora so she can use it to forget about Adonis, who she had a disastrous blind date with. He is able to retrieve it from Ares' sons, but Meg leaves Hercules behind to escape. She is taken to the Underworld by Pain and Panic and Hercules, despite her betrayal, goes after her. During a fight for the amphora, Meg tells Hercules she liked him from the start; they almost kiss, but the amphora's water is dropped on them, causing them to forget how they met. The episode "Hercules and the Yearbook" takes place after the events of the film and features Hercules and Meg moving his stuff from Phil's island. Hermes delivers a special package, which Hercules immediately hides from Meg. Phil reveals the incidents that occurred during his time at school, and Hercules tells Meg he did not want to show her the yearbook because he wants her to see him as a hero. However, Meg tells him that she accepts that part of his life regardless. However, this does not stop Hercules from having Hermes retrieve Meg's yearbook, and it is revealed Meg was a cheerleader and in the glee club.

She appears in the television series House of Mouse as a guest. She also appears in Kingdom Hearts II as an inhabitant of Olympus Coliseum, where she meets Sora in the Underworld entrance. She later assists Sora in the fight against the Hydra by providing items. She returns in the sequel, Kingdom Hearts III.

Kacey Rohl portrays a version of Meg in the fifth season of Once Upon a Time.

== Phil ==
Philoctetes, Phil for short, is a satyr who trains aspiring heroes, but has often been disappointed by his trainees' shortcomings. He retired after failing to train a successful hero, but returns to the career after being convinced to train Hercules.

After his training is complete, Phil, Hercules and Pegasus set out for the city of Thebes, where Hercules can prove his newfound worth as a hero. Along the way, Hercules saves Meg from the centaur Nessus. While Hercules becomes attracted to Meg, Phil immediately clashes with her and considers her a distraction. After Hercules offers himself as a hero in Thebes, despite Phil insisting that he was the "genuine article", the Thebans dismiss Hercules as an "amateur" rather than a professional hero. After the defeat of the Hydra and various monsters, Phil becomes a personal manager to the celebrity hero Hercules has become. Later on, Phil discovers that Meg is working for Hades, her mission being to find Hercules' weakness. Phil tries to warn Hercules, but abandons him after an argument ensues and Hercules hits him in his anger. When Hercules loses his powers to Hades, Meg convinces Phil to return to Hercules, motivating him into battling and defeating the Cyclops through improvisation. During the fight, Meg is mortally wounded by a falling column while saving Hercules, and Phil is left taking care of Meg while Hercules fights Hades and the Titans. After Hercules defeats Hades, Phil goes with Hercules to Mount Olympus, where he is seen making out with Aphrodite. When Hercules and his friends return to Thebes, Phil is gratified when the people refer to the mighty and triumphant Hercules as "Phil's boy".

In the TV series Hercules, he is Hercules's coach and best friend and sidekick.

Phil also appears in the Disney/Square Enix video game series Kingdom Hearts, in Kingdom Hearts II and Kingdom Hearts III. He also appears in Kingdom Hearts Birth by Sleep, in which Zack Fair asks him to train him as a hero. He also appears in the television animated series House of Mouse. Phil is also a playable character who is available to unlock for a limited time in Disney Magic Kingdoms.

In the film, Phil is voiced by Danny DeVito, while Robert Costanzo voices him in video games and television appearances. Ichirō Nagai voiced him in Japanese until his death, while Lakis Lazopoulos voices him in Greek.

== Pegasus ==
Pegasus (vocal effects provided by Frank Welker) is the winged horse of Hercules, who was created by Zeus out of clouds to aid Hercules. Zeus describes him as "a magnificent horse with the brain of a bird", as Pegasus' behavior is like both a steed and a bird, with habits such as clicking his tongue, whistling and, at times, perching on Hercules' shoulder.

Pegasus also appears in the Disney/Square Enix video games Kingdom Hearts II and Kingdom Hearts III. Pegasus is also a playable character who is available to unlock for a limited time in Disney Magic Kingdoms.

== Hades ==
Hades (voiced by James Woods) is the brother of Zeus and Poseidon. Unlike his mythological counterpart, who is typically portrayed as a feared but relatively passive deity, this portrayal of Hades is more comedic while still being a villain. He wears dark robes with a skull-shaped perone fastening a chiton and his hair is a glowing blue flame that resembles the will-o'-the-wisp. His hair flares up when he is excited and turns red when he is angry; this flame can also be extinguished. Hades seeks to overthrow Zeus and rule the universe, in line with other depictions of Hades in pop culture being villainous due to his association with death.

=== In Hercules ===
In Hercules, Hades visits the Fates and learns that he could succeed at universal conquest by releasing the Titans in eighteen years, but if Hercules should fight, he will fail. To prevent this, he sends his minions, Pain and Panic, to kidnap baby Hercules and give him a potion that would render him mortal and kill him. However, Hercules does not drink all of it, and thus retained his godlike strength. Pain and Panic, however, tell Hades that Hercules is dead, hoping that he will not find out.

At some point, Meg sold her soul to Hades so he would return her boyfriend's soul. He did, but soon after Meg's boyfriend dumped her for another girl. As a result, she remains trapped as a slave to Hades, and he uses her beauty and charm to persuade monsters to join his army.

After discovering that Hercules is still alive, Hades sets up the Hydra as a fixed contest, but Hercules is able to defeat him. Frustrated, Hades sends more monsters, only for Hercules to defeat them. After learning that Hercules has fallen in love with Meg, he uses this to his advantage and makes a deal with Hercules: he must give up his superhuman strength for the next twenty-four hours in exchange for Meg's freedom. Hercules agrees, as long as Meg will be safe from any harm. Hades then reveals that Meg was working for him, crushing Hercules' will to fight. Hades then releases the Titans, who defeat and imprison the gods, and sends the Cyclops to kill Hercules to keep him from interfering in his plans, but Hercules defeats the monster using his wits. However, Meg is seriously injured saving Hercules from a falling pillar, negating Hades's deal that she would not be hurt. Hercules regains his powers and returns to Mount Olympus, where he defeats the Titans and frees the gods. Hades is upset by this, but taunts Hercules, telling him that while he was fighting the Titans, Meg died from her injuries.

At the film's post-climax battle, Hercules then travels to the Underworld to rescue her soul and offers himself to Hades in exchange for her freedom. He swims into the River Styx to retrieve her soul; he nearly dies, but his godhood is restored by the selfless act of being willing to risk his life to save her. Hercules emerges from the pit with Meg's soul in his arms, much to Hades' shock and anger. Knowing that he cannot stop Hercules, Hades begs him to try and ease things with him and the other gods, but Hercules refuses and punches Hades into the River Styx, where he is swarmed by vengeful souls and dragged into its depths.

=== In television series ===
Hades, once again voiced by James Woods, frequently appears in the Hercules TV series as one of Hercules' various antagonists. Unlike the film, Hades knew about Hercules' survival while Hercules was a teenager. Like in the film, Hades ultimately wanted control over Olympus, but his goals varied between each episode. Hades concocted several schemes, including (but not limited to) stealing Apollo's sun while Hercules was on duty as an intern to inspire a vote of No Confidence in Zeus ("Hercules and the Apollo Mission"), teaming up with Poseidon to move the River Styx to Greece as a means to conquer the country ("Hercules and the River Styx"), attempting to eliminate Hippocrates (and temporarily succeeding in doing so) after the latter causes a shortage of dead souls in the Underworld due to his medical procedures ("Hercules and the World's First Doctor"), and rewriting reality with the Tapestry of Fate to swap lives and roles with Zeus ("Hercules and the Tapestry of Fate"). Ultimately, all of Hades' schemes failed by the end of each episode due to the work of Hercules and his allies.

The crossover episode "Hercules and the Arabian Night" had Hades meet with Jafar's spirit from Disney's Aladdin franchise in the Underworld after the latter's defeat in The Return of Jafar. The two teamed up to try to take out Hercules and Aladdin by kidnapping Abu and Icarus and having the two heroes fight each other under the pretenses of saving their friends from the other hero. Hades also temporarily brought Jafar back to life by giving the latter a staff that granted Jafar a new body for as long as Jafar holds the staff. The two villains ultimately failed due to the heroes' teamwork, and Hercules broke Jafar's new staff in two. This led to Jafar being dragged down into the River Styx, presumably defeating him for good.

Hades also appears in several episodes of the television series House of Mouse, often in cameo appearances. He has a relevant role in the episode "Suddenly Hades", where after Pete tries to get the House closed by turning up the thermostat, as Mickey's contract states that the House will close if it is ever empty, Hades' ability to tolerate heat means that he remains comfortable in the House despite the rise in temperature, thus allowing Mickey to keep the House open. He also has another relevant role in the episode "Halloween with Hades", where he tries to ask Maleficent out on a date and asked Mickey for advice; while this advice does not work, Hades is able to win her over by showing his fiery personality in a fit of rage towards Mickey. The two are referred to by Minnie Mouse as "a match not made in heaven". He also appears in the series' direct-to-video film Mickey's Magical Christmas: Snowed in at the House of Mouse, as well as Mickey's House of Villains. In the latter, James Woods only voices Hades for one line, while Rob Paulsen provides the singing voice of Hades in the song "It's Our House Now!".

An iteration of Hades acts as a main antagonist in the second half of the fifth season of Once Upon a Time, portrayed by Greg Germann.

=== In video games ===
Hades also appears in the Kingdom Hearts series, where James Woods reprises his role as his English voice, while he is voiced in Japanese by Kyusaku Shimada, who does an impersonation of Woods. He was originally in league with Maleficent and used the Heartless to try to take over the worlds. Hades wants to dispose of Hercules and tricks Cloud Strife into challenging Hercules in the Preliminaries at the Olympus Colliseum. In return, Hades "promises" Cloud he will lead him to Sephiroth. However, once Sora arrives, Hades changes plans and has Cloud attack Sora. When Cloud refused to kill Sora or is defeated, depending on the outcome, Hades sends Cerberus to take care of Cloud. After Maleficent's defeat, Hades battles Sora and loses. In Kingdom Hearts: Chain of Memories, a facsimile Hades appears as part of Sora's memory and the darkness in Riku's heart. In Kingdom Hearts II, Hades joins forces with Pete and decides to use Auron, who has already died, to fight against Hercules; however, Auron rebels against Hades and fights him, only to be interrupted by Sora, Donald Duck, and Goofy. They fight Hades, but, due to the Underworld curse, he is invincible to their attacks. Hades then sends Cerberus and later the Hydra against Sora and his friends. Upon discovering that Sora's Keyblade can unlock any lock, Hades initially plans to use it to unlock the Underdrome, the Underworld's own coliseum. However, when Pete informs him that the Keyblade will only work for Sora, Hades kidnaps Megara and traps her in the locked Underdrome, forcing Sora to unlock it to rescue her. After defeating Pete and the Hydra again, Sora and his friends eventually fight and defeat Hades. However, Hades survives and acts as a challenger in the last tournaments, which are unlocked near the end of the game. In the prequel Kingdom Hearts Birth by Sleep, he attempts to use Terra to kill Hercules, but Terra resists the darkness in his heart, so Hades places Zack Fair under his control to eliminate both Terra and Hercules. However, Terra defeats Zack and frees him from Hades' influence. Later, Hades and the Ice Colossus, a replica of the Ice Titan, fight Aqua in the Coliseum, but Aqua defeats both of them and Hades flees to the Underworld to further his plans. In Kingdom Hearts III, Hades puts his final plan into motion, unleashing all the Titans to assault Olympus, but Hercules, along with Sora, Donald, and Goofy, thwart his plans.

Hades is a playable character who is available to unlock for a limited time in Disney Magic Kingdoms.

Hades appears in the DLC "The Storybook Vale" for Disney Dreamlight Valley, being one of the villagers of the titular valley.

In the mobile game Twisted Wonderland, Hades is honored as "The King of the Underworld," one of "The Great Seven," due to his hard work and duty to his role as Lord of the Dead. At the magic school Night Raven College, one of the dorms, Ignihyde, is dedicated to him, and students sorted into this dorm are expected to reflect his spirit of "diligence". This is the newest dorm to be instated at the college (of the Great Seven, Hades is the latest of the list of Disney Villains by film chronology).

The character Idia Shroud, housewarden of Ignihyde, is the Twisted Wonderland incarnation of Hades; there is a slight implication in the game's lore that Idia's family might be descended from Hades as well. Idia has flaming blue hair (which will flare bright red when angered), is resigned to his work for his family's organization, and his signature spell can open a portal to the Underworld. Both Hades and Idia also use and reference modern technology/pop culture. Unlike Hades's penchant for humor and quips, Idia is more pessimistic and withdrawn, preferring to stay in his room and communicate via a tablet.

Hades makes an appearance in flashback when the game's protagonist dreams of the events of the first film in Book 6.

=== Other appearances ===
Hades stars in "Villains Tonight" on the Disney Magic and Disney Dream, a musical stage show featuring many villains from various Disney films, including Dr. Facilier, Ursula, Scar, Yzma, Maleficent, the Evil Queen, Captain Hook, Cruella de Vil, and Jafar, as well as Pain and Panic. In the plot of the show, Hades has "softened a bit" and made the Underworld a fun place. However, the Fates tell him he has until midnight to become more evil or he will no longer rule the Underworld. Therefore, he summons the most evil villains in his quest to become more evil.

Hades appears in the film Descendants 3, where he is portrayed by Cheyenne Jackson. Hades is among the villains imprisoned on the Isle of the Lost by King Beast, despite his godhood. He is later revealed to be Mal's father, and briefly lends his ember to her to undo a spell done by a jealous Audrey. He is later brought over from the Isle of the Lost to revive Audrey, in the act insinuating that the punishment of Beast is injust and that he has a prejudice about the villains. By the end of the film, Hades approves of Mal's marriage to Ben, as interaction between Auradon and the Isle of the Lost is now allowed. Cheyenne Jackson also voices Hades in the animated television special Descendants: The Royal Wedding. A teenage Hades appears in Descendants: The Rise of Red, portrayed by Anthony Pyatt.

Disney Villains: Hades, a comic book miniseries by Dynamite Entertainment tells a story of Hades scheming to steal the Golden Fleece and use its reality-warping power to conquer Olympus. To do this, he assembles a team to help him consisting of Arachne, Orpheus, Icarus and the Minotaur making sketchy claims to reward them with their desires. The team finds themselves racing Jason and the Argonauts to Colchis, which has been warned of the heist by Medusa, who rejected Hades's offer.

== Pain and Panic ==
Pain (voiced by Bobcat Goldthwait) and Panic (voiced by Matt Frewer) are a pair of shapeshifting imps who are Hades' minions. Pain is fat and crimson, while Panic is skinny and turquoise. Panic is paranoid and easily scared, but appears to be relatively smart and is cautious. He appears to be more honest than Pain. Pain is bossy, hot-tempered, and sly, but also clumsy and impulsive; he also seems to be less intelligent than Panic.

In the film, Hades sends them to kidnap baby Hercules, make him mortal, and kill him. However, they fail to kill him, and he keeps his godlike strength, allowing him to dispose of them before they have a chance to kill him. Not wanting Hades to know about their failure, they tell him that Hercules is dead. Many years later Hades discovers that Hercules is actually alive. Throughout the rest of the film, they are seen either cheering Hades's monsters on, buying Hercules' merchandise, grovelling to Hades, or using their powers to contact Meg. When Hades plots against Hercules, Pain and Panic lure and capture Pegasus by assuming the form of a female Pegasus. At the end of the film, Hades is punched into the river Styx, which they witness and hope he does not return.

Pain and Panic also appear in the Hercules TV series as Hades's lackeys. They also appear in the House of Mouse television series, usually along with Hades. They also appear in Kingdom Hearts II, where they are working for Hades and work at the Underdrome. Pain and Panic are also playable characters who are available to unlock for a limited time in Disney Magic Kingdoms.

== Gods ==
=== Greek Gods ===
==== Olympian Gods ====
- Zeus (voiced by Rip Torn in the film, Corey Burton in the TV series and Kingdom Hearts III, and Genzo Wakayama in Japanese in Kingdom Hearts III) is the ruler of Mount Olympus and king of the gods, as well as Hera's husband and father of most Olympian gods. Many eons ago, Zeus imprisoned the Titans, who threatened to destroy the world, deep beneath the ocean. Unbeknownst to Zeus, the next planetary alignment would reveal the location of the Titans' prison, and he is unaware his brother Hades was planning to release the Titans. Following Hercules's birth, Hades kidnaps him and makes him mortal to prevent the prophecy from coming true, as it would result in his defeat. When Hercules grows into a teenager and goes to his temple, Zeus tells him that he must become a "true hero" to rejoin the gods, which he later defines as something more than being famous. However, he refuses to clarify what it means as this is something that Hercules needs to figure out on his own, only telling Hercules to "look inside his heart". Zeus is later betrayed by Hades, but Hercules later saves him and Olympus. Hercules becomes a god after sacrificing himself to save Meg, as Zeus reveals that his son is finally a true hero and can be a god. Nonetheless, Zeus is supportive of his son's decision to remain with Meg on Earth.
- Hera (voiced by Samantha Eggar) is the goddess of women and marriage and the queen of the gods. She is also Zeus's wife and mother of most Olympian gods.
- Hermes (voiced by Paul Shaffer) is the messenger of the gods, who is frequently sent by Zeus to contact Hercules.
- Apollo (voiced by Keith David) is the god of light and music and Artemis's twin brother, who drives the Solar chariot.
- Amphitrite (voiced by Leslie Mann) is the goddess of the sea, Poseidon's wife, and Otus and Triton's mother.
- Aphrodite (voiced by Lisa Kudrow) is the goddess of love, who is strong minded, feisty, and clever. She is Hephaestus's wife, but it is indicated that she is attracted to Phil, whom she is seen making out. As well, Hades is constantly trying to flirt with her, to no avail. In Hercules and the Dream Date, she brings Hercules' clay sculpture to life after he asks her for a favor.
- Ares (voiced by Jay Thomas) is the brash god of war, who seeks to destroy Athens and prove the superiority of Sparta. He has two "dogs of war", Brutacles and Sadisto, who draw his chariot.
  - Fear and Terror (voiced by David Cross and Toby Huss) are the dimwitted and strong sons of Ares.
- Artemis (voiced by Reba McEntire) is the goddess of the hunt and wild animals, and Apollo's twin sister. She is seen protecting the Calydonian Boar and transforms a few of the characters into animals, a reference to her turning Actaeon into a stag in mythology. She is also seen scolding Orion, referencing her role in his death in mythology.
- Athena (voiced by Jane Leeves) is the goddess of wisdom and Ares's sister. Ares frequently tries to destroy her worship city of Athens, but Athena is able to stop him with help from Hercules. Athena has a pet owl named Ibid that she once lent to Hercules to help him pass Herodotus's exam.
- Aurora is the goddess of the dawn and Helios's sister, who is equivalent to Eos. She is mentioned in the episode "Hercules and the Jilt Trip".
- Boreas (voiced by Alan Rosenberg) is the god of the North Wind. He seems to have a grudge against Ares for beating him up during Sparta's creation.
- Bacchus (voiced by Dom DeLuise) is the god of wine and partying. He nearly sinks Phil's island with his revelry, which bothered Poseidon.
- Cupid (voiced by Tom Arnold) is the god of passion. He is depicted as an overweight, middle-aged man wearing a diaper. He is Ares and Aphrodite's son, Phobos and Deimos's brother, and Psyche's husband. He has minions called Cherubs, and his quiver holds both "love" and "loathe" arrows. In the film, he is depicted as a skinny teenager and is seen congratulating Hercules.
- Demeter (voiced by Florence Henderson) is the goddess of agriculture. She sends Nemesis to smite the satyr Pan for his inadequate offerings at her harvest festival and building a temple to himself. She is also seen among the gods congratulating Hercules.
- Eileithyia is the goddess of childbirth and Zeus and Hera's daughter, who appears at Hercules's birth party.
- Hebe is the goddess of youth and Zeus and Hera's daughter, who appears at Hercules's birth party.
- Hecate (voiced by Peri Gilpin) is the goddess of witchcraft, who longs to take over the Underworld from Hades. Despite seemingly disliking his realm, he is willing to defend it from her.
- Helios is the god of the sun and Aurora's brother. He never physically appears in the series, but the Colossus of Rhodes – which resembles him – appears in "Hercules and the Hero of Athens". He also appears at Hercules's birth party.
- Hephaestus (voiced by Kevin Michael Richardson) is the god of fire and the gods' blacksmith, who has a peg leg for a right leg. He is Aphrodite's husband, and hates when Hades flirts with her. In the film, Hephaestus forges Zeus' thunderbolts when the Titans attack Mount Olympus.
- Hestia (voiced by Betty White) is the goddess of family and the hearth. She is often seen cooking or marveling at her own confections, most of which end in failure, such as when Adonis caused Hercules to crash into her cake.
- Iris is the goddess of the rainbow and Boreas's wife. She is mentioned in the episode "Hercules and the Kids".
- Morpheus (voiced by Jonathan Katz) is the god of sleep. He has a little brother called Phantasos, who wanted to become the god of sleep, but was rejected by Zeus because of "seniority". He is also among the gods congratulating Hercules at the end of the film.
- Narcissus is the god of pride and Trivia's brother. Despite not being a god in Greco-Roman mythology, he was depicted several times in the film and the series as an Olympian god.
- Nemesis (voiced by Linda Hamilton) is the goddess of vengeance. She works for the Infernal Retribution Service (IRS), a service which punishes mortals who disrespect the gods. She can turn her hands into weapons.
- Nike is the goddess of victory and Styx's daughter. She is mentioned in the episode "Hercules and the Poseidon's Cup Adventure". She also appears at Hercules's birth party.
- Otus (voiced by Brad Garrett) is Poseidon and Amphitrite's son and Triton's brother.
- Pan (voiced by Joe Pantoliano) is the god of nature, the wild, shepherds and flocks, and mountain wilds, and Hermes's son. Despite being the king of the satyrs, he wants to be worshiped as a god by his people. Pan gains the wrath of Demeter, who threatens to send Nemesis to smite him for building a temple to himself if he does not give her suitable offerings by the end of the harvest festival. After attempting to get Phil to take his place, Pan is forced to give up the offerings of the festival. He also appear in the episode "Hercules and the Prince of Thrace" in the story of the Muses with King Midas.
- Persephone is the goddess of springtime and Demeter's daughter. She is one of the gods seen congratulating Hercules at the end of the film.
- Phantasos (voiced by Tom Kenny) – At the start of the world, Phantasos wanted to be the god of sleep, only for his brother Morpheus to get the job. Since then, Phantasos plotted to get the job; to this end, he creates a nightmare counterpart of Morpheus' Blanket of Slumber called the Discomforter. Due to the nightmares people are having, Phantasos suggested to Zeus that he become the new god of sleep should Morpheus fail to stop the nightmares. When in their dreams, Hercules and Phil end up fighting Phantasos, who takes on the form of Hydra and Typhon, and are able to defeat him. The next day, Morpheus convinces Zeus to make Phantasos the god of dreams and nightmares since he is much better at the job than his brother.
- Poseidon (voiced by Jason Alexander) is the god of the sea, Zeus and Hades's brother, Amphitrite's husband, and Otus and Triton's father. He appears several times in the film, such as when the gods congratulate Hercules. He also appears in the series as part of the Olympian council. In "Hercules and the Bacchanal", he sunk Phil's island because of Hercules's party, but revives it afterward. In "Hercules and the River Styx", he dealt with Hades to give him a bigger superiority to avenge Athena for taking Athena under her safety, but is later trapped and imprisoned with Athena by Hades. However, Poseidon and Athena were freed as Poseidon beats up Hades. In "Hercules and the Son of Poseidon", Poseidon persuades Hercules to let Triton attend Prometheus Academy after saving the boat Hercules was on. In this appearance, Hercules referred to Poseidon as his uncle. In "Hercules and the Poseidon's Cup Adventure", Poseidon creates a boat race in his honor.
- Psyche is Cupid's wife, who appears at Hercules's birth party.
- Styx is the goddess of Styx and Nike's mother. She appears in the episode "Hercules and the River Styx".
- Triton (voiced by Chris Elliott) is Poseidon and Amphitrite's son and Otus's brother. He yearns to be a hero like his cousin Hercules. He appears in "Hercules and the Son of Poseidon", where Poseidon talks Hercules into letting him attend Prometheus Academy.
- Trivia (voiced by Ben Stein) is the god of trivia and Narcissus's brother, despite usually being female in mythology. In "Hercules and the Pool Party", Trivia was the only god not invited to Hades' pool party at Lethe due to Hades not considering him important enough to invite.

==== Titans ====
The Titans were the giant rulers of the world when it was first created and rampaged until they were imprisoned by Zeus. Four of the five Titans represent one of the four elements. Since then, they held a powerful grudge against Zeus. Upon the planets aligning, Hades frees the Titans and directed them to Mount Olympus so they can get revenge on Zeus for imprisoning them while Agres was sent to kill Hercules. They were defeated by Zeus and Hercules as Hercules made Agres fall to his death and sent the Titans flying into outer space where they exploded. The Titans also appear as bosses in Kingdom Hearts III.

- Lythos (voiced by Corey Burton and Patrick Pinney) is a two-headed Titan made of rock, who created the earth. During the final battle, he is beheaded by Zeus. He also appears in Kingdom Hearts and Kingdom Hearts III as a boss. Unlike in the film, Zeus does not behead Lythos.
- Hydros (voiced by Jim Ward) is a skeletal Titan made of ice, who created water. Hydros also appears in as a boss in Kingdom Hearts in the Olympus Colisseum, and in Kingdom Hearts III, where he fights Hercules and Sora alongside Pyros and Stratos. In Kingdom Hearts Birth by Sleep, a replica of him created by Hades appears as a boss.
- Pyros (voiced by Jim Cummings) is a blob-like Titan made of lava who created fire. Pyros appears as a boss in Kingdom Hearts III, where he fights Hercules and Sora alongside Hydros and Stratos.
- Stratos (voiced by Corey Burton) is a Titan who resembles a living tornado, and created air. Hercules used Stratos to suck up the other Titans and send them into outer space. Stratos appears as a boss in Kingdom Hearts III, where he fights Hercules and Sora alongside Hydros and Pyros and is fought after Hydros and Pyros are defeated.
- Agres (voiced by Patrick Pinney) is a gigantic pink-skinned cyclops who Hades instructed to find and kill Hercules while he was weakened while the other four Titans attacked Mount Olympus. Hercules initially struggles to defeat Agres until Phil comes to his aid and tells him he does not need strength to beat him. Thinking quickly, Hercules shoves a torch into his eye, blinding him; he then uses the opportunity to tie Agres' legs together, causing him to trip and fall off a cliff to his death.

The animated series added some of the named Titans from mythology:

- Antaeus (voiced by Miguel Ferrer) is a half-Titan who founded the P.O.O.T.L.s ("People's Organization of Titanic Liberators") so he could free the Titans. He held Prometheus Academy hostage, wanting Hercules as prisoner so that he can force Zeus to release them.
- Atlas (voiced by Thomas Lennon) is a muscular Titan cursed to forever hold up the sky at the edge of the world. He appears in "Hercules and the Prince of Thrace".
- Gaia (voiced by Kerri Kenney) is the goddess of the Earth, who sleeps deep beneath the Earth and dislikes anyone who disturbs her, such as Adonis after he awoke her from her eternal slumber.
- Prometheus (voiced by Carl Reiner) is a kind Titan who stole fire from Olympus and gave it to humanity so they could improve their lives. As punishment, Zeus had Prometheus chained to a rock, where every day the Caucasian Eagle plucked out and ate his liver, which regrew again every night. In the episode "Hercules and the Prometheus Affair", Hercules releases him and convinces Zeus that he did the right thing.
- Kronos is the former ruler of the universe and father of Zeus, Poseidon, and Hades. Upon discovering that one of his children would overthrow him, he attempted to devour them whole; however, he was defeated by Zeus and sealed in an unknown region of Tartarus. As a last act, he created the Kronos Stone, which would cast any god who approached it into eternal sleep. Hades hoped to use the stone to overthrow Zeus.
- Rhea is the wife of Kronos and mother of Zeus, Hera, Poseidon, and Hades.
- Mnemosyne is the titaness of memory and remembrance, she is the mother of the Muses. She is mentioned by Hermes in "Hercules and the Drama Festival".

=== Other Greek myths ===
- The Fates are three deities who see the future and decide how long mortals live. They share a single eye among them, a trait taken from another mythological trio, the Graeae.
  - Clotho (voiced by Amanda Plummer in the film, Tress MacNeille in the TV series) is the Fate who spins the Thread of Life. She has green skin, wavy yellow worm-like hair and a long pointed chin. In the film, she is flattered by Hades.
  - Lachesis (voiced by Carole Shelley) is the Fate who measures the thread's length and decides how long mortals will live. She has blue skin and a long pointed nose.
  - Atropos (voiced by Paddi Edwards) is the Fate who cuts the thread. She is short, has purple skin, green serpent-like hair and is the only fate to have one eye socket. In "Hercules and the Tapestry of Fate", she has a crush on Hercules and flirts with him.
- The Muses are the five goddesses who provide inspiration for the fine arts, who act as a girl group to narrate the story as a Greek chorus. The Muses also appear in Mickey Mouse Funhouse, where they reside in the Land of Myth and Legend.
  - Calliope (voiced by Lillias White) is the Muse of Epic Poetry, who wears a headband over her big, curly hair. She is the tallest Muse, and serves as their de facto leader.
  - Clio (voiced by Vaneese Thomas) is the Muse of History, who wears her hair in a ponytail.
  - Melpomene (voiced by Cheryl Freeman) is the long-haired, melodramatic Muse of Tragedy.
  - Terpsichore (voiced by LaChanze) is the Muse of Dance, who has short hair.
  - Thalia (voiced by Roz Ryan) is the short and plump, wisecracking Muse of Comedy.

=== Norse Gods ===
In the episode "Hercules and the Twilight of the Gods", Hercules and Phil visit Valhalla and meet the Norse gods, including:

- Loki (voiced by Vince Vaughn) – The cunning, manipulative god of mischief, who planned to have Hercules replace Thor as the god of thunder, allowing him to more easily bring about Ragnarok.
- Odin (voiced by Garrison Keillor) – The one-eyed king of Valhalla, who is rather deadpan and often exasperated by Loki and Thor's antics.
- Thor (voiced by David James Elliott) – The loud and aggressive god of thunder, who wields the hammer Mjolnir. He briefly loses his position to Hercules after being defeated by him in a duel; the challenge was actually fixed by Loki, who wanted Thor out of the way because he is predicted to avert Ragnarok.

=== Egyptian Gods ===
In "Hercules and the Romans", the gods of the Egyptian mythology earn temporary worship from the Roman Empire before the Greek pantheon assumes this role and they are driven away by Hercules and Icarus.

- Ra (voiced by Stan Freberg) – A god with the head of a falcon.
- Bastet – A goddess with the head of a cat.
- Khnum – A god with the head of a ram.

== Prometheus Academy ==
The Prometheus Academy is a fictional high school that appears in the Disney animated television series Hercules. Though set in Ancient Greece, specifically Athens, the academy shares many traits with modern educational institutions. It is coeducational, with both male and female students, and teaches subjects such as history, astronomy, shop class, theater arts, and "Home Greconomics".

As a teenager, Hercules attends the academy while training with Philoctetes to become a hero. Many other students at the academy are based on characters from mythology.

The academy was named after the Titan Prometheus, who brought fire from Mount Olympus, the metaphorical "light of reason", to mankind, and was punished by Zeus by being chained to a rock and having his liver pecked out by an eagle each day for eternity. A bronze statue depicting Prometheus and his punishment is the central point of the academy's courtyard.

=== Prometheus Academy students ===
- Icarus (voiced by French Stewart) is Hercules' best friend, who escaped from the Labyrinth with his father Daedalus on wax wings. He became "brain-fried" after flying too close to the Sun, but despite his accident, he still flies when he gets the chance. He is very adaptable, but can be jealous and act irrationally. Daedalus is a teacher at the academy, but Icarus does not acknowledge his parents' divorce. Icarus flirts with Cassandra at every opportunity he gets, despite Cassandra not reciprocating his feelings. After graduating, he goes into inventing with his father and makes a fortune, earning the commercial title "The Wax-Wing King". Phil says that in adulthood, Icarus helps his father with inventions.
- Cassandra (voiced by Sandra Bernhard) is the other best friend of Hercules, an attractive yet anti-social girl. She is the daughter of Vic (Fred Willard) and Evelyn (Georgia Engel), who is cursed with the ability to foresee catastrophic events, but never to be believed. When one of these prophetic trances overcome her, she becomes immobile, which Icarus calls her "Cassandra-Vision". Cassandra is constantly annoyed by Icarus's flirtatious behavior towards her, but tolerates his presence because before Hercules joined the trio, she had no friends besides him. But even after she befriended Hercules, she still continues to socialize with Icarus, even admitting to him that she considers him a good friend. In adulthood, Cassandra's visions have made her famous, even getting her own public show.
- Adonis (voiced by Diedrich Bader) is the cowardly and narcissistic prince of Thrace, who believes that anything can be solved with power and money. He bullies Hercules and Icarus every chance he gets, but sometimes can be their friend. He also annoys the gods, which resulted in Gaia putting a curse on him once. In "Hercules and the Yearbook" at graduation, he was one credit short and had to attend summer school as a result.
- Anaxarete (voiced by Cree Summer) is Hercules's girlfriend during "Hercules and the Jilt Trip", who later breaks up with him.
- Andromeda (voiced by Kath Soucie) is a new student who attracts Hercules's attention.
- Ajax (grunts by Frank Welker) is a barbarian student with poor hygiene.
- Electra (voiced by Joey Lauren Adams) is a goth student with a habit of defying the established order who believes in freedom of creativity. She is a good person, but vicious Furies are created whenever she feels angry.
- Helen of Troy (voiced by Jodi Benson) is a caring and enthusiastic girl who is the most popular girl in the academy and Adonis' girlfriend. She likes Hercules, but as a friend. Like in mythology, she is a princess, but is not a half-sister of Hercules.
- Melampus (voiced by Ethan Embry) is a rival of Icarus, due to Cassandra's affections. He is a fan-boy of the comic-scroll superhero Myklos.
- Pandora (voiced by Jenna von Oÿ) is a student who possesses a locker full of mysteries.
- Tempest (voiced by Jennifer Jason Leigh) is the quick-tempered Amazon "Warrior Princess". She is the daughter of Queen Hippolyta and King Darius.

=== Prometheus Academy staff ===
The following are the faculty members of Prometheus Academy:

- Parentheses (voiced by Eric Idle) is the principal.
- Cassiopeia (voiced by Alice Ghostley) is the poetry professor.
- Phys Oedipus (voiced by Richard Simmons) is the Physical Education professor.
- Miss Thespius (voiced by Kathy Najimy) is the drama professor. She has very long, ankle-length, brown hair worn in a ponytail.
- Daedalus (voiced by David Hyde Pierce) is the ProAc Shop Class Instructor, Icarus's father, and greatest inventor of all antiquity.
- Herodotus (voiced by Paul Reubens in his first appearance, Jess Harnell in his second appearance) is the strict History professor.
- Pygmalion (voiced by Calvert DeForest) is the Art professor, who is married to a statue of a woman that Aphrodite brought to life.
- Ptolemy (voiced by George Takei) is an Astronomy Instructor.
- Aesop (voiced by Bob Keeshan) is the Storytime Instructor for ProAc Jr (Prometheus Junior Academy).
- Euphrosyne (voiced by Melissa Manchester) is the Home Greconomics Professor.
- Linus (voiced by Jason Marsden) is the Music professor.
- Euclid is the Geometry professor.

=== Jr. Prometheus Academy students ===
The junior school attached to Prometheus Academy. The students that attend are also figures from mythology or ancient history, but are preteen versions of these characters before they became famous. One of their teachers is Mr. Aesop, who tells stories, his eponymous fables, to teach students.

- Alcides (voiced by Christine Cavanaugh)
- Alex (voiced by Courtland Mead) is a kid whose sandals are always untied because he has trouble with knots. Just like his historical counterpart, Alex would become Alexander the Great and solve the Gordian Knot by slicing it.
- Brutus (voiced by Pamela Adlon) is a centaur foal.
- Callista (voiced by Lacey Chabert)
- Phillip (voiced by Ryan O'Donohue) is a kid with teething troubles.

== Heroes ==
- Achilles (voiced by Dom Irrera) is an old hero who everyone has forgotten except for Hercules. He was once trained by Phil, but failed due to his heel.
- Agamemnon (voiced by Patrick Warburton) is a famous hero who is the drill sergeant for the Spar O.T.C.
- Alectryon (voiced by Steve Hytner) is a guard and former student of Philoctetes, who was turned into a rooster for falling asleep on guard duty and crows to wake people up.
- Bellerophon (voiced by David Schramm) is the hero king of Corinth, who takes Pegasus in and names him "Ignatius". With help from Pegasus, Bellerophon is able to defeat the Chimera.
  - Cletus (voiced by Charles Kimbrough) is Bellerophon's servant.
- Butes (voiced by Steven Wright) is the beekeeper from the Argo.
- Chiron (voiced by Kevin Michael Richardson in his first appearance, Louis Gossett Jr. in his second appearance) is a centaur and hero, who is now a famous hero-trainer and author. He is both a rival and friend to Phil and a hunting buddy of Nestor and Meleager.
- Hippocrates (voiced by Mandy Patinkin) is the World's First Doctor. He cures people of plague and is capable of bringing the dead back to life, much to the dismay of Hades.
- Hylas (voiced by Rocky Carroll) is "the bad boy of rowing". In "Hercules and the Poseidon Cup Adventure", he was on Adonis' team until he got injured and Hercules ended up taking over.
- Jason (voiced by William Shatner) is the leader of the Argonauts.
- Lynceus (voiced by Larry Miller) is the helmsman of the Argo.
- Melampus (voiced by Ethan Embry) is dating Cassandra, which makes him Icarus' rival. Icarus once tried to hurt him, but was stopped by Hercules.
- Meleager (voiced by Nicholas Turturro) is usually with Nestor. He has extraordinary hearing abilities.
- Mentor (voiced by Edward Asner) is a tough retired police chief and Chipacles' friend.
- Nestor (voiced by Jim Belushi) is usually with Meleager. He can see very far.
- Odysseus (voiced by Steven Weber) is a cunning king of the Greek island of Ithaca.
  - Telemachus (voiced by Justin Shenkarow) is the prince of Ithaca. He, Hercules and three Argonauts end up on their own Odyssey after someone opened the bag of winds given to him by King Aeolus.
- Orpheus (voiced by Rob Paulsen) is a singer and teen idol.
- Paris (voiced by Cary Elwes) is a Trojan Academy student and arrogant Trojan prince.
- Pheidippides was mentioned as a student of Chiron who ran 10000 metres and set a new world record.
- Samson is described as a student of Chiron's who is very strong and is an "out of towner", referring to him being from Israel.
- Theseus (voiced by Eric Stoltz) is Hercules' cousin, who briefly enrolls at Prometheus Academy. He helps Hercules face the Minotaur after it escapes from the Labyrinth. Theseus has an alter ego as the superhero "Grim Avenger", whose costume resembles that of Doctor Fate, though his personality and backstory are more like Batman.

== Supporting ==
- Bob (voiced by Charlton Heston in the film and Robert Stack in the TV series) is an incorporeal voice who opens most episodes and is sometimes helped by the Muses, who act as a Greek chorus. Bob has a wife named Mrs. Bob and two children named Tiffany and Chad. Their only appearance on screen is in the episode "Return of Typhon", when Bob is convinced by the Muses to take a holiday.
- Demetrius (voiced by Wayne Knight) is a pottery salesman who owns a pottery shop. He barely tolerates Hercules out of fear of him breaking his pottery, but the loss of his shop angers him to the point that he orders Amphitryon to keep him away from the marketplace.
- Amphitryon (voiced by Hal Holbrook) is a mortal farmer and Hercules' father, who is protective of him.
- Alcmene (voiced by Barbara Barrie) is Amphitryon's wife and Hercules' mother, who is friendly and loving.
- Charon is the rower of the ferry in the Underworld.
- Circe (voiced by Idina Menzel) is a sorceress who, while looking for suitable boyfriends, turns most of the male cast into various animals.
- Chipacles (voiced by Mike Connors) is the head city-state police officer for the Athens Police Department, who takes his job very seriously.
- Croesus (voiced by Wayne Newton) is the richest man in the world and owner of Atlantis City, whose vast wealth causes the Gods and the Fates to give in to his bribes. He once had Pain and Panic capture Cassandra after bribing Hades so that the vision of Atlantis City sinking would not come true. He even bribed the Fates to declare the vision false. After Homer was also captured, Hercules goes to rescue Cassandra and Homer, causing Croesus to bribe Poseidon to send Scylla to attack Hercules. Their fight accidentally caused the Fates to cut the Atlantis City banner, causing Cassandra's vision to come true and the Fates to flee back to Fate Mountain.
- Galatea (voiced by Jennifer Aniston) is the statue Hercules had Aphrodite to bring to life for him as a date to the Aphrodasia Because he asked that her personality would be "crazy about [him]", Galatea becomes increasingly obsessive about him, trying to get back to him even after he dumped her and dropped her off on an island in the middle of nowhere. Being made of clay, she displays morphing abilities that she uses to endanger anyone that might get between her and Hercules. She was later solidified by an accidental fire, and Aphrodite changes her personality to free will, granting her a mind of her own.
- Princess Lavina (voiced by Cheri Oteri) was Geryon's girlfriend for four days before breaking up with him for unknown reasons. She quickly became infatuated with Hercules upon meeting him and, due to Phil's attempts at helping Hercules get over his own break up, believed he reciprocated her feelings. After telling her that was not the case, she was heartbroken until he convinced her to give Geryon another chance. She and Geryon have since gotten back together.
- King Tivius (voiced by Val Bettin) is the father of Lavina.
- Gregarious (voiced by Stuart Pankin) is the proprietor of Gyro World, where Hercules once interned as part of a project at Prometheus Academy.
- Homer (voiced by Dan Castellaneta) is a journalist for a national news-scroll, the "Greekly World News". He tends to exaggerate the facts in his writing for dramatic effect, as seen when he rewrites the rivalry between the Prometheus and Trojan Academies into the story of the Trojan War as well as getting the story on the sinking of Atlantis City.
- King Midas (voiced by Eugene Levy) is a greedy king who, through Bacchus's gift, gains the ability to turn everything he touches into gold, and seeks Hermes' sandals to transform the whole world. After being foiled by Hercules, Midas sees the negative side of his power after accidentally turning his daughter Marigold to gold. To remedy this, King Midas prayed to Bacchus to remove the gift; he does, and Marigold is returned to normal. In "Hercules and the Prince of Thrace", the Muses sing about how Midas was given donkey ears by Apollo.
  - Marigold (voiced by Tia Carrere) is the daughter of Midas.
  - Agent Epsilon (voiced by Craig Ferguson) is an agent of Midas who was pretending to be with Athens Intelligence to lure Hercules into a trap.
- King Cinyras (voiced by John O'Hurley) is Adonis's father and Queen Myrrha's husband.
- Queen Myrrha (voiced by Holland Taylor) is King Cinyras's wife and Adonis's mother.
- King Minos (voiced by Charles Nelson Reilly) is the insane King of Crete, who had Daedalus construct a labyrinth to imprison the Minotaur.
- King Salmoneus (voiced by Jeffrey Tambor) is the King of Thessaly. To keep his morality high to the people, he ends up impersonating Zeus and gets struck by a lightning bolt by Zeus after being exposed. After escaping from the Grove of Despair, he conspires with Pain and Panic to reclaim his throne.
- Nereus (voiced by Jim Cummings) is an elderly, grouchy shape-shifter able to turn into various creatures to make people leave him alone. In "Hercules and the Prince of Thrace", Nereus nearly defeats him until Adonis comes to his aid.
- Numericles and Calculus (voiced by Stephen Tobolowsky and Kevin West) – Numericles is the creator of the abacus and a great figure for Abacus Valley, while Calculus is his aide. In "Hercules and the Techno Greeks", they seek a hero to help them defeat the local centaurs.
- Orion (voiced by Craig Ferguson) is a great hunter, Artemis' ex-boyfriend, and the inventor of the "Orion Cluster". Due to him almost killing off every animal on Earth, he was made a constellation by Artemis to keep Zeus from smiting him. Hercules once freed him to teach him how to use the bow, inadvertently releasing the constellations of Leo, Taurus, Aries, Scorpius, and the Big Dipper.
- Pericles (voiced by Earl Hindman) is a statesman of Athens.
- Queen Hippolyta (voiced by Jane Curtin) is Tempest's mother and Queen of the Amazons.
- King Darius (voiced by Emeril Lagasse) is the Tempest's father, the King of the Amazons, and a renowned chef.
- Tiresias (voiced by Jack Carter) is a blind prophet who resides at the Elysian Sunset Rest Home.

== Creatures ==
- Acheron (voiced by Joel Murray) and Ocnus (voiced by Kathy Kinney) are a giant spider and giant mosquito duo who tried to prey off of Hercules and the Jr. Prometheus Academy students.
- Arachne (voiced by Vicki Lewis) is a spider-like monster who is the guardian of the Tapestry of Fate; she only became a guardian because her mother said she should see the world and eat exotic people. She appears in "Hercules and the Tapestry of Fate"., where she attempts to eat Hercules and Icarus, but is unsuccessful. When Hades changed the Tapestry, Arachne was reduced to minding the cave where the Tapestry used to be.
- Argus Panoptes (voiced by Harvey Fierstein) is a multi-eyed monster who has a history with Hermes, and appears in "Hercules and the Bacchanal".
- Briareos (voiced by Reggie Miller) is a Hecatonchires. In this show, Briareos is a giant that can conjure arms from the ground and water. He is also a fan of the comic book hero Myklos.
- The Caucasian Eagle (voiced by Jerry Stiller) is a giant eagle who was ordered by Zeus to eat Prometheus's liver every day. It appears in "Hercules and the Prometheus Affair". Hercules battled the eagle while trying to free Prometheus; after Hercules freed the Titan, the Eagle allied with Hades, who briefly turned him into a fiery phoenix to battle Hercules again.
- Catoblepas (vocal effects provided by Frank Welker) is a bull monster that Phil once fought, who appears in "Hercules and the Phil Factor".
- The Centaurs are a race of creatures who are half-man and half-horse.
  - Nessus (voiced by Jim Cummings) is a large centaur who is known as the "River Guardian". He is a minor villain and, in the film, is the first monster Hercules fought in his journey to become a true hero. Hades wanted to recruit Nessus into his army and sent Meg to do so, but Nessus wanted Meg to be his lover in exchange. She refused, but this only made Nessus more persistent. However, Hercules intervenes and defeats him in a fight.
- Charybdis is a sea monster with no eyes and a mouth in her head, capable of creating giant whirlpools that swallow ships whole. She appears in "Poseidon's Cup Adventure" and in "Hercules and the Odyssey Experience".
- The Cyclopes are one-eyed giants like Agres, but are smaller than him.
  - Zool (voiced by Bill Fagerbakke) is a Cyclops that is friends with Medusa.
- Doubt is a snake that bites people, causing them to drown in fear and doubt. Hades called him in to strike Icarus so that he would not kiss Cassandra because she sold her soul to him to ensure this, but his bite wore off quickly. While fighting Hercules, who is trying to make the kiss happen, Doubt easily defeats Hercules and attempts to eat him until Aphrodite intervenes. Aphrodite blows a kiss to Doubt, making the serpent feel love, and gives Hercules a kiss before letting him down.
- Echidna (voiced by Kathie Lee Gifford) is the mother of all monsters and Typhon's wife. She had a recurring role in the series, where her various children battle Hercules but are defeated. In "Hercules and the Big Games", Hades enlisted Echidna to bring her children to where Athens and Sparta are holding the first Olympic games so that her children can feed off the spectators. After Hercules defeated her children, Echidna engaged Hercules before being defeated by Athena and Ares. In "Hercules and the Return of Typhon", Echidna seeks revenge on Athens, leading to Hercules accidentally releasing Typhon. With help from Hera, Hercules and Zeus repelled Echidna and Typhon, as well as their latest child Ladon, and had Homer correct the story afterward. In "Hercules and the Parents Weekend", Echidna learns that Ladon kidnapped the parents of those that attended Prometheus Academy. As Echidna chases after Hercules after he freed the parents, Zeus' lightning bolts strike two rocky formations to incapacitate her.
  - Cerberus (vocal effects provided by Frank Welker) is the three-headed dog that guards the Underworld for Hades. He also appears in the series as a rambunctious Rottweiler puppy that Hades struggles to control.
  - Chimera (vocal effects provided by Frank Welker) is a fire-breathing enemy of Bellerophon. It has the head and front legs of a lion, the horns and back legs of a goat, and a snake-headed tail; its body and tail are black. It appears in "Hercules and the Pegasus Incident". In "Hercules and the Big Games", the Chimera is among the children of Echidna that accompany their mother to where Athens and Sparta are having their first Olympic games.
  - An unnamed blue Cyclops with a single horn and hooves is the son of Echidna as revealed in "Hercules and the Big Games" where it was among the children of Echidna that accompany their mother to where Athens and Sparta are having their first Olympic games.
  - Gegeines (voiced by Brad Garrett in the first appearance, Frank Welker in the second appearance) is a multi-armed sailor-eating giant who resembles a yeti and was encountered by Hercules and the Argonauts in "Hercules and the Argonauts" where the local sea nymphs feed sailors to him in exchange that he doesn't feed off of them. The episode "Hercules and the Big Games" revealed that Gegeines is one of Echidna's children as seen when he accompanied his mother to where Athens and Sparta are having their first Olympic games.
  - The Hydra is an enormous serpent-like creature that grows multiple heads every time one is chopped off. In the film, the Hydra serves as the second, more difficult monster Hercules faces after completing his hero training. Hercules unintentionally releases the Hydra from a cave, which has been set up as a fixed contest by Hades to kill him, and bravely faces this tremendous monster with just his sword and his wits. Although the Hydra initially swallows Hercules whole, the young hero is able to cut his way out from inside, but then three heads grow from the wound. Hercules keeps slicing, flying around on Pegasus as the snarling heads gang up to attack him. Finally, as the Hydra pinned Hercules to a cliff, he smashes his fists into the mountainside, causing an avalanche that buries the multi-headed monster under a mountain of rocks. Hercules's victory earns him fame and adoration from the people of Thebes. In the animated series, the Hydra is referenced several times, such as young Hercules swearing as a hero-in-training to help against beasts like "zillion-headed Hydras" or seeing a cloud shaped like a Hydra being slain by a brave hero. In "Hercules and the Long Nightmare", Hercules has nightmares of his adult and teenage self being attacked by a three-headed Hydra "as scary as they come" until he overcame his fear.
  - Ladon (vocal effects provided by Frank Welker) is the youngest of Echidna's monsters, who resembles a dragon. He tried to eat Hercules multiple episodes, but is unsuccessful. In "Hercules and the Big Games", Ladon is among the children of Echidna who accompany their mother to where Athens and Sparta are having their first Olympic games. Around the time when it captured the parents of those who attended Prometheus Academy during "Hercules and the Parents Weekend", Ladon started teething.
  - The Nemean Lion (voiced by Jeremy Piven) is a huge lion with an impenetrable hide, who appears in both the film and the episode "Hercules and the Hero of Athens". In "Hercules and the Big Games", the Nemean Lion is among the children of Echidna who accompany their mother to where Athens and Sparta are having their first Olympic games.
  - Orthos (voiced by Brad Garrett and Wayne Knight) is a two-headed Cyclops that Hercules first fought in "Hercules and the First Day of School" to prove he is not nobody. The head near his right arm sports a mohawk, while the head near his left arm has a ponytail. At Echidna's instruction, Orthos initially tries to eat Hercules before discarding him for being "stale" and a nobody. The two heads later set their sights on Adonis, but they are defeated by Hercules, humiliating them. In "Hercules and the Epic Adventure", Orthos sought revenge for making them the laughingstock of the monster community.
- Fenrir is a monstrous wolf that was released by Loki in a plot to incite Ragnarok, who appears in "Hercules and the Twilight of the Gods".
- The Frost Giants are the giants of Norse legend from Jotunheim, who appear in "Hercules and the Twilight of the Gods". They are composed of ice and snow, similar to the Ice Titan, and are agents of Loki and enemies of all that is good.
- The Furies are a flock of giant birds that live in the Underworld. In "Hercules and the Complex Electra", Furies were created when Electra got angry and disappeared when she was calm.
- Geryon (voiced by Will Ferrell) is a monster with three torsos with each head and arms on it, who appears in "Hercules and the Jilt Trip".
- Griffin – Griffins are a race of creatures that are part-eagle and part-lion. In the film, Hades sends him to kill Hercules together with Stheno and the Minotaur, but the three are defeated by Hercules.
  - Griff (voiced by Tim Conway) is an elderly griffin that guarded a diamond that Hephaestus forged. He resides at the Elysian Sunset Rest Home.
  - Merv Griffin (voiced by Merv Griffin) is an Athenian griffin who has his own talk show.
- Gorgon – The Gorgons are creatures that have snakes for hair and can petrify people with their gaze.
  - Medusa (voiced by Jennifer Love Hewitt) is the famous gorgon whose gaze turns people to stone. This depiction of her is lonely and longs for friends. She appears in "Hercules and the Gorgon".
  - Stheno (voiced by Andrea Martin) is Medusa and Euryale's sister. She appears in "Hercules and the Phil Factor". In the film, Hades sends her to kill Hercules together with the Minotaur and the Griffin, but the three are defeated by Hercules.
  - Euryale is Medusa and Stheno's sister. In the episode "Hercules and the Phil Factor", she was seen in a picture on Stheno's fireplace.
- King Arismap (voiced by Harvey Korman) is the King of the Arismapse, a race of thieving mountain gnomes, who had been trying to steal the diamond that Griff guards.
- King Ephialtes (voiced by Jim Varney) is a tree giant who is the King of the Dryads and Syrinx's father. He appears in "Hercules and the Muse of Dance".
  - Syrinx (voiced by Annie Potts) is a nymph who is Ephialtes's daughter. She appears in "Hercules and the Muse of Dance".
- The Laestrygonian (voiced by Patrick Warburton) is a giant that Hades tries to lure to his side. He is a big fan of Orpheus.
- The Man-Eating Mares (vocal effects provided by Frank Welker) – Dangerous horses who Phil helps Hercules take down. Hades sends Neurosis to make sure Hercules fails. When the Man-Eating Mares prove to be difficult for Hercules, he calls upon Zeus, who possesses his statue after Cerberus destroyed his cloud, for help, and he scares them off. They appear in "Hercules and the Tiff on Olympus".
- Memnon (voiced by David Alan Grier) is a reptilian fire-breathing monster, similar to a half-man and half-dragon, who is a servant of Hades. He fights the hero Achilles, who briefly allied himself with Hades to separate Hercules and Phil, but was later sent to kill Hercules and Phil until Achilles intervenes. He appears in "Hercules and the Living Legend" and "Hercules and the Phil Factor".
  - The Minotaur (voiced by Michael Dorn) is a creature with the head and hindquarters of a cattle and the arms and torso of a man. In this show, the Minotaur is depicted as a child of Echidna. He appears in two episodes: in "Hercules and the Minotaur", where he was housed inside a Labyrinth built by Daedalus in Crete for its insane king Minos, and in "Hercules and the Grim Avenger", where he escaped from Crete and reached Athens, fighting Theseus and Hercules only to be subdued and placed back by the gods. In the film, Hades sends a different Minotaur to kill Hercules together with Stheno and the Griffin, but the three are defeated by Hercules. The episode "Hercules and the Bacchanal" implies that there are more than one Minotaur since there is an event called the Brotherhood of Satyrs, Minotaurs and Other Half-Human Convention. In addition, the episode "Hercules and the Parents' Weekend" reveals that a purple Minotaur is shown to be a child of Echidna in a flashback.
- Scylla is a sea monster resembling a woman with an eel's tail and six eel-like heads circling her waist. Hercules fights her in "Hercules and the Big Sink" and "Hercules and the Odyssey Experience".
- Sea serpent are a type of creature that are serpents or dragons.
  - Ceto/Cetus is a green sea serpent. During the Zero to Hero song in the film, Hercules easily defeats the monster and turns it into a fishing trophy. In "Hercules and the Underworld Takeover", it appears as a much larger sea serpent that attacks Hercules while he crosses the River Styx until he knocks it away.
  - Sea Snake - In "Hercules and the Complex Electra", the snake was served as "sauté of sea snake" in the Prometheus Academy cafeteria. The snake attacked Hercules, Icarus, and Cassandra shortly before Hercules met Electra.
  - Three-Headed Sea Serpent (vocal effects provided by Frank Welker) is a three-headed sea monster Poseidon defeats and imprisons in "Hercules and the Son of Poseidon". After it is accidentally released, Hercules tried to fight it, but struggles to. He and his cousin Triton later fight it after it attacks the Prometheus Academy. Poseidon plans to banish it to the deepest parts of the ocean where the giant squids reside.
- Sphinx Martindale (voiced by Wink Martindale) is a trivia game show host who asks questions nobody can answer, until Hercules is able to win his show and a chariot.
- Squiggles is a giant squid that appears in "Hercules and the Bacchanal" as Poseidon's pet. After Phil's island sinks, the squid attacks young Hercules and Hermes, almost eating the two before Poseidon summons him.
- Typhon (voiced by Regis Philbin) is the father of all monsters and Echidna's husband. He was imprisoned by Zeus under Mount Etna. In the episode "Hercules and the Return of Typhon" Hercules accidentally releases him while fighting with his wife Echidna. In the process, it is revealed that Hera helped Zeus to fight Typhon as she helps Hercules and Zeus repel him and Echidna. Afterward, Homer learns the truth and corrects the story.
- The Winged Wolves of Hecate (voiced by Jon Cryer and Jim Cummings) are two wolves with bird-like wings who work for Hecate.
