= Mulan (franchise) =

Disney franchise

Disney's Mulan
- Created by: Rita Hsiao; Chris Sanders; Philip LaZebnik; Raymond Singer; Eugenia Bostwick-Singer; Robert D. San Souci
- Original work: Mulan (1998)
- Owner: The Walt Disney Company
- Years: 1998–present

Print publications
- Book(s): Mulan: Before the Sword (2020)

Films and television
- Film(s): Mulan (1998); Mulan (2020)
- Direct-to-video: Mulan II (2004)

Theatrical presentations
- Musical(s): Mulan Jr.

Games
- Video game(s): Disney's Animated Storybook: Mulan (1998); Disney's Mulan (1998); Disney Infinity 3.0 (2015)^{*}

Audio
- Soundtrack(s): Mulan: An Original Walt Disney Records Soundtrack (1998); Mulan II (2005); Mulan (2020)

Miscellaneous
- Theme park attraction(s): Mulan Parade (1998–2001)
- ^{*} Work where this franchise's characters or settings appeared as part of a crossover.

Mulan is an American Disney media franchise that began in 1998 with the theatrical release of Mulan.

== Films ==
Film	U.S. release date	Director(s)	Screenwriter(s)	Story by	Producer(s)
Original series
Mulan	June 19, 1998	Barry Cook and Tony Bancroft	Rita Hsiao, Chris Sanders, Philip LaZebnik and Raymond Singer & Eugenia Bostwick-Singer	Robert D. San Souci	Pam Coats
Mulan II	February 1, 2005	Darrell Rooney and Lynne Southerland	Michael Lucker & Chris Parker and Roger S. H. Schulman	Michael Lucker & Chris Parker and Roger S. H. Schulman	Jennifer Blohm
Remake Film
Mulan	September 4, 2020	Niki Caro	Rick Jaffa & Amanda Silver and Lauren Hynek & Elizabeth Martin		Chris Bender, Jake Weiner and Jason T. Reed

=== Animated films ===
==== Mulan (1998) ====
Mulan is a 1998 American animated musical action-comedy-drama film produced by Walt Disney Animation Studios based on the Chinese legend of Hua Mulan.

==== Mulan II ====
Mulan II is a 2004 American direct-to-video Disney animated film directed by Darrell Rooney and Lynne Southerland and is a sequel to the 1998 animated film Mulan.

=== Live-action films ===
==== Mulan (2020) ====
Walt Disney Pictures released a live-action version of Mulan produced by Chris Bender and J.C. Spink through their company Benderspink and directed by Niki Caro. The film stars Liu Yifei as the titular character, Donnie Yen as Commander Tung, Tzi Ma as Hua Zhou, Jason Scott Lee as Bori Khan, Yoson An as Chen Honghui, Rosalind Chao as Hua Li, Xana Tang as Hua Xiu, Ron Yuan as Sergeant Qiang Gong Li as Xian Lang and Jet Li as The Emperor of China. Disney had scheduled the film to be released on March 27, but was later delayed to July 24, 2020, due to the COVID-19 pandemic. The film was delayed again to August 21, 2020. The film's theatrical release was eventually canceled in the United States and would instead have its premiere for a premium fee on Disney+ on September 4, 2020. It was still released theatrically in countries where theaters re-opened, such as China, as well as in other countries that do not have Disney+. The film had its world premiere at the Dolby Theatre in Los Angeles on March 9, 2020. A sequel is in development.

==== Future ====
In April 2020, it was reported that a Mulan sequel is in development with Chris Bender, Jake Weiner, and Jason T. Reed returning as producers.

== Television ==
Mulan never received a television series. However, the film's characters (usually the title character) have appeared in House of Mouse, Once Upon a Time, and Sofia the First.

== Audiobook ==
- In 1999, an audiobook was released on a cassette tape and read-along book.
- On 1 January 2004, as part of Disney's Storyteller Series, Mulan was made into an hour long audio book read by Roy Dotrice.

== Musical ==
=== Mulan Jr. ===
Mulan Jr. is a stage musical version of the 1998 Disney animated film Mulan. It features many new songs.

== Video games ==
=== Mulan ===
Disney's Mulan is a game released on the Game Boy.

=== Disney's Animated Storybook: Mulan ===
Disney's Animated Storybook: Mulan is a game in the Disney's Animated Storybook series developed by Media Station, which retell the plot of Disney films in abridged and interactive storybook settings. It was released for Microsoft Windows, Macintosh, and PlayStation. The PlayStation version was released under the name Disney's Story Studio: Mulan, with the port developed by Revolution Software (under the name "Kids Revolution").

=== Kingdom Hearts series ===
Mushu appears in the first Kingdom Hearts video game and in Kingdom Hearts: Chain of Memories as a summon character. Kingdom Hearts II features a world based on the film, "The Land of Dragons", which includes several characters from the film, including Mulan as a party member.

=== Disney Infinity ===
Disney Infinity was an action-adventure toys-to-life video game series developed by Avalanche Software and published by Disney Interactive Studios that ran from 2013 to 2016. Mulan was referenced throughout the series via in-game toys and power discs. In the third and final game in the series, Disney Infinity 3.0, Mulan was released as a playable character for the game's Toy Box mode. Her figure was released on August 30, 2015, the same day the game was first released.

=== Disney Magic Kingdoms ===
In a limited time Event focused on Mulan, the world builder video game Disney Magic Kingdoms included Mulan, Li Shang and Mushu as playable characters, as well as some attractions based on locations of the film. Cri-Kee, Khan and Shan Yu were also included as playable characters in later updates. Costumes for Mulan based on her Warrior costume as Ping and her Comfy costume from Ralph Breaks the Internet are also available. All new content in the Mulan collection was included during Lunar Year celebrations.

== Theme park attractions ==
=== Mulan Parade ===
The Mulan Parade in Disney's Hollywood Studios premiered on June 19, 1998, which was the same day the movie was released. Mostly using an instrumental of the song "Honor to Us All" (with some of "I'll Make a Man Out of You" thrown in) as the theme, it featured over 53 performers. The parade ended March 11, 2001 and was replaced by the "Stars and Motor Cars" parade. The parade included Mushu, a matchmaker, future brides, pagodas, a moongate, warriors, Shan Yu, the Great Wall, street performers, stiltwalkers, kung-fu performers, a Chinese lion, Shang, Mulan, and The Emperor. The parade was replaced by Disney Stars and Motor Cars Parade. The Los Angeles Times wrote "The new parade emphasizes richly hued costumes, street choreography and story-telling floats instead of high-tech effects. Highlights include a giant carriage drawn by four huge Percheron horses, and a troupe of performers from Chinese circuses. Its budget is a fifth of what the much-hyped Light Magic parade wound up costing, and its advertising budget is zero."

=== Meet and greets ===
Mulan appears at all the Disney Parks as a meetable character, and is based in Adventureland. She is most often joined by Mushu and occasionally Li Shang.

== Cast and characters ==
List indicators

This section includes characters who will appear or have appeared in the series.

- An empty grey cell indicates the character was not in the film, or that the character's official presence has not yet been confirmed.
- ^{S} indicates an appearance through use of special effects.
- ^{Y} indicates a younger version of the character.

Characters	Animated films		Live-action film
Characters	Mulan	Mulan II	Mulan
Mulan	Ming-Na Wen	Ming-Na Wen	Yifei Liu
Mulan	Lea Salonga^{S}	Lea Salonga^{S}	Crystal Rao^{Y}
Mushu	Eddie Murphy	Mark Moseley	
Captain Li Shang	BD Wong	BD Wong	
Captain Li Shang	Donny Osmond^{S}	BD Wong	
Yao	Harvey Fierstein	Harvey Fierstein	Chen Tang
Ling	Gedde Watanabe	Gedde Watanabe	Jimmy Wong
Ling	Matthew Wilder^{S}	Gedde Watanabe	Jimmy Wong
Chien-Po	Jerry Tondo	Jerry Tondo	Doua Moua
Fa Zhou	Soon-tek Oh	Soon-tek Oh	Tzi Ma
The Emperor of China	Pat Morita	Pat Morita	Jet Li
The Matchmaker	Miriam Margolyes	April Winchell	Cheng Pei-pei
Fa Li	Freda Foh Shen	Freda Foh Shen	Rosalind Chao
Cri-Kee / Cricket	Frank Welker	Frank Welker	Jun Yu
Khan	Frank Welker	Frank Welker	Black Wind
Grandmother Fa	June Foray	June Foray	
Grandmother Fa	Marni Nixon^{S}	June Foray	
First Ancestor Fa	George Takei	George Takei	
Little Brother	Chris Sanders	Frank Welker	
Shan Yu	Miguel Ferrer		
Chi-Fu	James Hong		
General Li	James Shigeta		
Princess Mei of China		Lucy Liu	
Princess Mei of China		Beth Blankenship^{S}	
Princess Ting-Ting of China		Sandra Oh	
Princess Ting-Ting of China		Judy Kuhn^{S}	
Princess Su of China		Lauren Tom	
Princess Su of China		Mandy Gonzalez^{S}	
Sha-Ron		Jillian Henry	
Lord Qin		Keone Young	
Prince Jeeki		Rob Paulsen	
Shopkeeper		Michelle Kwan	
Commander Tung			Donnie Yen
Chen Honghui			Yoson An
Xianniang			Gong Li
Bori Khan			Jason Scott Lee
Hua Xiu			Xana Tang
Sergeant Qiang			Ron Yuan
The Chancellor			Nelson Lee
Red Fez			Arka Das

== Music ==
=== Soundtracks ===
==== Mulan ====
Mulan: An Original Walt Disney Records Soundtrack is the soundtrack for the 1998 Disney animated feature film, Mulan. Released by Walt Disney Records on June 2, 1998, the album featured songs by Matthew Wilder and David Zippel, conducted by Paul Bogaev, and score composed and conducted by Jerry Goldsmith. Vocalists included Lea Salonga, Donny Osmond, 98 Degrees, Jaz Coleman, Stevie Wonder and Christina Aguilera. The album peaked at No. 24 on the Billboard 200 on July 18, 1998, concurrent to the film's run in theaters. No singles from the album charted on the Hot 100, although the Aguilera's cover of "Reflection", did reach number 19 on the Adult Contemporary chart.

- "Written in Stone"
- "Honor to Us All"
- "Reflection"
- "Keep 'Em Guessing"
- "I'll Make a Man Out of You"
- "A Girl Worth Fighting For"

==== Mulan II ====
Mulan II: Original Soundtrack is the soundtrack for the 2005 Disney animated sequel, Mulan II. Released by Walt Disney Records on January 25, 2005, the album was produced by Brian Rawling, Graham Stack, and Brett Swain, with all scores composed and conducted by Joel McNeely. The album features songs by Jeanine Tesori, Mathew Wilder, and Joel McNeely; lyrics composed by Alexa Junge, David Zippel, and Kate Light. Vocalists include Lea Salonga, Atomic Kitten, Harvey Fierstein, Jerry Tondo, Gedde Watanabe, Randy Crenshaw, Beth Blankenship, Mandy Gonzalez, Judy Kuhn, and Hayley Westenra. The soundtrack earned 3 out of 5 stars in professional ratings from AllMusic.

- "Lesson Number One"
- "Main Title"
- "Like Other Girls"
- "A Girl Worth Fighting For (Redux)"
- "Here Beside Me"
- "(I Wanna Be) Like Other Girls"
- "The Journey Begins"
- "In Love And In Trouble"
- "The Attack"
- "Shang Lives!"
