= Mulan (1998 soundtrack) =

1998 soundtrack album by various artists

Mulan: An Original Walt Disney Records Soundtrack

Soundtrack album by Various artists
- Released: June 2, 1998
- Recorded: 1997–1998
- Genres: Pop; musical theatre; operatic pop
- Length: 51:29
- Label: Walt Disney
- Producers: Jerry Goldsmith; Matthew Wilder

Singles from Mulan: An Original Walt Disney Records Soundtrack
- 1. "True to Your Heart" Released: May 24, 1998; 2. "Reflection" Released: June 15, 1998

Professional ratings
Review scores
Source	Rating
Allmusic	2.5/5 stars
Filmtracks	4/5 stars
Sputnikmusic	4/5

Mulan: An Original Walt Disney Records Soundtrack is the soundtrack for the 1998 Disney animated feature film Mulan. Released by Walt Disney Records on June 2, 1998, the album featured songs composed by Matthew Wilder and David Zippel, conducted by Paul Bogaev, and a score written by Jerry Goldsmith. Vocalists included Lea Salonga, Donny Osmond, 98 Degrees, Jaz Coleman, Stevie Wonder and Christina Aguilera.

The album peaked at No. 24 on the Billboard 200 on July 18, 1998, concurrent to the film's run in theaters. No singles from the album charted on the Hot 100, although Aguilera's version of "Reflection" did reach number 15 on the Adult Contemporary chart, while 98° and Stevie Wonder's "True to Your Heart", the film's theme song, did reach number 51 on the Adult Contemporary chart.

The collective efforts of Zippel, Wilder, and Goldsmith were nominated for the Academy Award for Best Original Musical or Comedy Score at the 71st Academy Awards, but lost to Shakespeare in Love.

A limited edition promotional album featuring Jerry Goldsmith's complete score was also released and became a collector's item.

The Japanese version has "Breathe" by Luna Sea as the theme song. The Korean version uses "Eternal Memory" by Lena Park.

== Track listing ==
All songs are composed by Matthew Wilder with lyrics by David Zippel. All scores are composed by Jerry Goldsmith.

No.	Title	Performer(s)	Length
1.	"Honor to Us All"	Lea Salonga, Marni Nixon & Beth Fowler	3:03
2.	"Reflection"	Lea Salonga	2:27
3.	"I'll Make a Man Out of You"	Donny Osmond & Chorus‡	3:22
4.	"A Girl Worth Fighting For"	Harvey Fierstein, Matthew Wilder, Jerry Tondo, Lea Salonga & James Hong	2:26
5.	"True to Your Heart"	98° & Stevie Wonder	4:16
6.	"Suite from Mulan" (score)		7:06
7.	"Attack at the Wall" (score)		4:59
8.	"Mulan's Decision" (score)		3:23
9.	"Blossoms" (score)		6:27
10.	"The Huns Attack" (score)		4:30
11.	"The Burned-Out Village" (score)		5:53
12.	"Reflection" (pop version)	Christina Aguilera	3:36

‡ Harvey Fierstein, Matthew Wilder, Lea Salonga and Eddie Murphy each have one line in the chorus, while Jerry Tondo has two.

=== Japanese version bonus track ===
13. "Breathe (special version)" — Luna Sea

=== Chinese version bonus track ===
13. "Reflection" (pop version) — Coco Lee

=== Hong Kong version bonus track ===
13. "影中我" ("Reflection" Chinese Version) — Kelly Chen

14. "男子漢" ("I'll Make A Man Out of You" Chinese Version) — Jackie Chan

=== Korean version bonus track ===
13. "Eternal Memory" — Lena Park (available in both English and Korean versions)

13. "Reflection" — Lena Park (Korean pop version)

=== Canadian French version ===
1. "Pour notre honneur à tous" (To everyone's honor) — Martine Chevrier, Dominique Faure, Catherine Léveillé & chorus
2. "Reflet" (Reflection) — Martine Chevrier
3. "Je ferai de vous des hommes avant tout!" (I will make men out of you first!) — Robert Marien, Michel Charette, André Montmorency, Alain Couture, Anthony Kavanagh, Martine Chevrier & chorus
4. "La fille de nos rêves" (The girl of our dreams) — André Montmorency, Alain Couture, Michel Charette, Sébastien Dhavernas, Martine Chevrier & chorus
5. "True to Your Heart" — 98°, Stevie Wonder
6. "Suite pour Mulan" (Suite for Mulan) — Instrumental
7. "Attaque au pied de la muraille" (Attack at the foot of the Wall) — Instrumental
8. "La décision de Mulan" (Mulan's decision) — Instrumental
9. "La jeune fille en fleurs" (The young blossoming girl) — Instrumental
10. "Les Huns attaquent" (The Huns attack) — Instrumental
11. "Le village en cendres" (The village in ashes) — Instrumental
12. "Reflection (version pop)" — Christina Aguilera

=== Greek version ===
1. "True to Your Heart (single)" — 98°, Stevie Wonder
2. "Reflection" Instrumental — Vanessa-Mae
3. "Kamári ólon mas, esý (Honor to Us All)" (Καμάρι όλων μας, εσύ) [Pride of all of us, you] — Despina Vandi, Christina Koutsoudaki, Chorus
4. "Poiá eímai? (Ποιά είμαι?) (Reflection)" [Who am I?] — Despina Vandi
5. "Leventiá! (Λεβεντιά!) (I'll Make a Man Out of You)" [Manliness!] — Despina Vandi, Petros Filipidis, Alex Panayi, Kostas Vretos, Kostas Bakalis, Pimis Petrou, Chorus
6. "Aftí pou s' agapá... (Αυτή που σ' αγαπά...) (A Girl Worth Fighting For)" [She who loves...] — Despina Vandi, Pimis Petrou, Kostas Vretos, Kostas Bakalis, Giannis Papaioannou
7. "Konta Mallia (Κοντά μαλλιά) (Short Hair)" — Instrumental
8. "To Thema Tis Mulan (Το θέμα της Μουλάν) (Suite from Mulan)" — Instrumental
9. "Epithesi Sto Tihos (Επίθεση στο τείχος) (Attack at the Wall)" — Score
10. "I Apofasi Tis Mulan (Η απόφαση της Μουλάν) (Mulan's Decision)" — Score
11. "Ta Anthi (Τα άνθη) (Blossoms)" — Score
12. "I Epithesi Ton Ounon (Η επίθεση των Ούνων) (The Huns Attack)" — Score
13. "To Kameno Horio (Το καμένο χωριό) (The Burned-Out Village)" — Score
14. "Reflection" (pop version) — Christina Aguilera

=== Polish version ===
1. "Lustro / Mirror" (Reflection: pop version) — Edyta Górniak
2. "Zaszczyt nam przyniesie to / The honor will bring us to" (Honor to Us All) — Mirosława Krajewska, Teresa Lipowska, Katarzyna Pysiak, Chorus
3. "Lustro / Mirror" (Reflection) — Katarzyna Pysiak
4. "Zrobię z was mężczyzn / I will make of you men" (I'll Make a Man Out of You) — Maciej Molęda, Robert Rozmus, Jerzy Stuhr, Katarzyna Pysiak, Jerzy Bończak, Marek Bocianiak, Chorus
5. "Ta, za którą walczyć chcesz / This, for which you want to fight" (A Girl Worth Fighting For) — Robert Rozmus, Jerzy Bończak, Marek Bocianiak, Katarzyna Pysiak, Paweł Galia
6. "Postrzyżyny" (Short Hair) — Instrumental
7. "Suita z Mulan" (Suite from Mulan) — Instrumental
8. "Atak" (Attack at the Wall) — Score
9. "Decyzja" (Mulan's Decision) — Score
10. "Pąki" (Blossoms) — Score
11. "Natarcie Hunów" (The Huns Attack) — Score
12. "Spalona wioska" (The Burned-Out Village) — Score
13. "Reflection" Instrumental — Vanessa-Mae
14. "True to Your Heart (Single)" — 98°, Stevie Wonder

=== Latin American Spanish version ===
1. "Nos vas a Brindar Honor / You're going to Provide us Honor"
2. "Reflejo / Reflection" — Analy
3. "Hombres de Acción Serán Hoy / Men of Action You'll Be Today" — Cristian Castro, Jesús Barrero, Miguel Ángel Ghigliazza, Raúl Carballeda, Eugenio Derbez, Analy
4. "Mi Chica es la Razón / My Girl is the Reason" — Raúl Carballeda, Analy, Mario Filio, Miguel Ángel Ghigliazza, Jesús Barrero
5. "Tu corazón / Your heart" — Cristian Castro
6. "Suite de Mulán"
7. "Ataque en la Muralla"
8. "La decisión de Mulán"
9. "Capullos"
10. "Atacan los hunos"
11. "La aldea quemada"
12. "Reflejo" (versión pop) — Lucero
13. "Reflejo" — Christina Aguilera (Special Edition)

=== Arabic version ===
1. ترفع رأسنا بين الناس / Turfae rasuna bayn alnnas / Lift our heads among the people (Honor to Us All)
2. مولان في المعركة / Mulan fi almaeraka / Mulan in battle (Mulan's fight)
3. صورتي / Surati / My image (Reflection)
4. منكم هعمل رجال مهما يكون / Minkum haemal rijal mahma yakun / Whatever you men have (I'll Make a Man Out of You)
5. قرار مولان / Qarar mawlan (Mulan's Decision)

=== Brazilian version ===
1. 'Honra a Todas Nós / Honor All Of Us' (Honor to Us All) — Kacau Gomes, Nádia Carvalho & Selma Lopes
2. 'Imagem / Image' (Reflection) — Kacau Gomes
3. 'Não Vou Desistir de Nenhum / I Will not Give up on You' (I'll Make a Man Out of You) — Cláudio Galvan
4. 'Alguém pra Quem Voltar / Someone Who to Come Back' (A Girl Worth Fighting For) — Isaac Bardavid, Marco Rodrigo & Deco Fiori
5. 'Seu Coração / Your heart' (True to Your Heart) — Sandy & Junior · _{Portuguese lyrics by Pavlos | Produced by Renato Lopez}
6. 'Tema de Mulan [Instrumental]' (Suite from Mulan)
7. 'Ataque na Muralha [Instrumental]' (Attack at the Wall)
8. 'A Decisão de Mulan [Instrumental]' (Mulan's Decision)
9. 'Botões em Flor [Instrumental]' (Blossoms)
10. 'O Ataque Hunos [Instrumental]' (The Huns Attack)
11. 'A Aldeia Queimada [Instrumental]' (The Burned-Out Village)
12. 'Imagem (pop version)' (Reflection - pop version) — Sandy · _{Portuguese lyrics by Marcelo Coutinho | Produced by Renato Lopez}

=== Mandarin Chinese version ===
1. 以妳為榮 (Yi Ni Wei Rong)
2. 真情的自我 (Zhen Qing de Zi Wo)
3. 男子漢 (Nan Zi Han)
4. 佳人歡迎我 (Jia Ren Huan Ying Wo)
5. 依隨你心 (Yi Sui Ni Xin)
6. 木蘭組曲 (Mu Lan Zu Qü)
7. 攻上城牆 (Gong Shang Cheng Qiang)
8. 木蘭的決定 (Mu Lan de Jüe Ding)
9. 遲來的花開 (Chi Lai de Hua Kai)
10. 匈奴進攻 (Xiong Nu Jin Gong)
11. 村破垣殘 (Cun Po Yuan Can)
12. 自己 (Zi Ji) — Coco Lee

=== Italian version ===
1. "Molto onore ci darai / Much honor you give us" — Cristina Dori, Melina Cartello, Marianna Cataldi
2. "Riflesso / Reflection" — Marianna Cataldi
3. "Farò di te un uomo / I'll make a man out of you" — Silver Pozzoli, Enrico Papi, Vittorio Matteucci, Gigi Giannola, Veris Giannetti, Marianna Cataldi
4. "Per lei mi batterò / I'll fight for her" — Vittorio Matteucci, Veris Giannetti, Gigi Giannola, Laura Lenghi, Michele Centonze
5. "Taglio di capelli / Haircut"
6. "Suite per Mulan / Suite for Mulan"
7. "Attacco alla muraglia / Assault on wall"
8. "La decisione di Mulan / Mulan's decision"
9. "Germogli in fiore / Buds in bloom"
10. "L'attacco degli unni / The Huns attack"
11. "Il villaggio in fiamme / The burning village"
12. "Riflesso (pop version)" — Syria

=== European Spanish version ===
1. Reflejo (dance version) — Malú
2. True to Your Heart (single) — 98°, Stevie Wonder
3. Reflection — Vanessa-Mae
4. Honra nos darás (Honor You Will Give Us) — Paula Bas, Celia Vergara, Marta Martorell, María Caneda
5. Reflejo — María Caneda
6. Voy a hacer todo un hombre de ti (I'm Going to Make a Man of You)— Pablo Perea, Juan Manuel Escamilla, Miguel Morant, Adel Hakki, María Caneda, José Sánchez Mota
7. Mi dulce y linda flor (My Sweet and Cute Flower) — Juan Manuel Escamilla, Miguel Morant, Adel Hakki, Eva Díez, Gonzalo Durán
8. Corte de pelo (Haircut)
9. Suite de Mulán (Suite from Mulan)
10. Ataque a la muralla (Attack at the Wall)
11. La decisión de Mulán (Mulan's Decision)
12. Flores (Flowers)
13. Los hunos atacan (The Huns Attack)
14. El pueblo en llamas (The Village on Fire)
15. Reflejo (pop version) — Malú

=== European French version ===
1. Honneur à tous — Marie-Thérèse Orain
2. Réflexion — Marie Galey
3. Comme un Homme — Jose Garcia, Michel Vigné, Patrick Fiori, Pierre Francois Pistorio, Thierry Ragueneau
4. Une belle fille à aimer — Marie Galey, Michel Vigné, Pierre Francois Pistorio, Thierry Ragueneau
5. Transformation
6. En quête de Mulan
7. La faille de la muraille
8. La décision de Mulan
9. L'éclosion
10. L'attaque des huns
11. Le village dévasté
12. Qui je suis vraiment — Melanie Cohl
13. Reflection — Vanessa-Mae
14. True to Your Heart — 98°, Stevie Wonder

== Charts ==
Album

Chart (1998)	Peak position
Canada Top Albums/CDs (RPM)	59
US Billboard 200	24

Singles

Year	Single	Artist	Chart	Position
1998	"Reflection"	Christina Aguilera	Adult Contemporary	19
1998	"True to Your Heart"	98º and Stevie Wonder	Adult Contemporary	51

=== Album certifications ===
Region	Certification	Certified units/sales
United States (RIAA)	Gold	500,000^{^}
^{^} Shipments figures based on certification alone.

== Unreleased songs ==
=== "China Doll" ===
A song titled "China Doll" was featured in the demo versions of the movie, but was replaced with "Honor to Us All" in the final version.

=== "Keep 'Em Guessing" ===
There is a deleted song aptly called "Keep 'Em Guessing", which was removed from the film when Eddie Murphy was cast as Mushu. This song was revealed on the Mulan 2-Disc Special Edition but Disney chose not to re-release the soundtrack to Mulan, despite doing so for the soundtracks to Beauty and the Beast, The Lion King, and Aladdin. It was brought back for the Mulan Jr. stage musical.

=== "Written in Stone" ===
"Written in Stone" was originally placed in the section where Mulan questions her identity and decides to write her own destiny rather than succumbing to societal gender roles. It was eventually replaced with "Reflection". Despite originally being a 4-minute power ballad, it is broken up into small pieces and reprised many times throughout the Mulan Jr. stage musical. It is sung by the ancestors in the intro as they explain the family structure of China much like Tradition in Fiddler on the Roof. A later reprise by Mulan demonstrates that she wants her life to be written in stone — but by herself, not by her ancestors.
