= Mulan Jr. =

Disney Musical

- Music: Matthew Wilder; Stephen Schwartz; Jeanine Tesori (Note: Additional music by Bryan Louiselle)
- Lyrics: David Zippel; Stephen Schwartz; Alexa Junge (Note: Additional lyrics by Bryan Louiselle and Patricia Cotter)
- Book: Patricia Cotter
- Basis: Mulan (1998); Ballad of Mulan

Mulan Jr. is a one-act stage musical based on the 1998 Disney animated film Mulan, which in turn was based on the Chinese legend of Hua Mulan and the story "Fa Mulan" by Robert D. San Souci. The adaptation mixes songs featured in the 1998 film as well as deleted songs from the film, including the revival of songs written by Stephen Schwartz, who was the original composer for the 1998 film before leaving to work on The Prince of Egypt. The musical is G-rated, any mature content from the sources it is based on having been deleted in the adaptation. The cast includes 26 roles plus an ensemble. The show was taken down from MTI's website in the summer of 2020, but it's being considered as a re-release but no date is currently set for if that does happen.

== Description ==
Mulan Jr. is a part of the Music Theatre International's (MTI) Broadway Junior series which adapts larger musicals and Disney productions to 30-minute (for the KIDS productions intended for elementary school-aged students) and 60-minute (for the Junior productions intended for middle-school aged students) musicals. Mulan Jr. rights can be purchased with a showkit which includes 30 scripts, 1 piano-vocal score, 2 rehearsal / accompaniment CDs, and 1 choreography DVD. The kit also includes 30 copies of Family Matters: A Parent's Guide to Theatre, a guide which offers parents tips to supporting their students as well as explain the rehearsal and performance process.

== Synopsis ==
The Fa Family Ancestors; Laozi, Lin, Zhang, Hong, Yun, introduce the setting as the day Mulan is set to meet the village Matchmaker ("Written in Stone'). Mulan's father, Fa Zhou prays to the family ancestors ("Honour to Us All") that she will make a good match. However, Mulan ruins her betrothal ceremony, bringing dishonor on the Fa Family ("Honor to Us All - Reprise") and consequently struggles with her identity ("Reflection"). Fa Zhou is then conscripted into the army by Chi Fu, The Emperor's councilor, after Shan-Yu and the Huns invade China. Mulan therefore disguises herself as a boy and steals her father's helmet and sword in order to run away from home and take his place in the army ("Written in Stone - Reprise"). The Fa Family ancestors task the dragon Mushu, a demoted family guardian, to stop Mulan before she is killed for her impersonation ("Honor to Us All- Reprise").

On their way to military training, Mushu gives Mulan advice on how to act like a man, in opposition to his orders to bring her back home ("Keep 'Em Guessin'"). When Mulan arrives at Military training, she introduces herself as "Ping" and undergoes training under Captain Shang with Yao, Ling, and Qian-Po ("I'll Make a Man Out of You/Lesson No. 1"). The soldiers travel to a mountain village to protect it from the Huns ("A Girl Worth Fighting For"), but when they arrive the village has already been destroyed. While the soldiers react to their failure ("A Girl Worth Fighting For – Reprise"), they are attacked by the Huns. Mulan triggers an avalanche which buries the Huns and allows the soldiers to escape. Shang gives his eternal trust to Ping, but soon discovers that Ping is actually Mulan. He chooses not to kill Mulan because she saved his life, but decides to leave her behind instead ("Written in Stone/Reflection – Reprise").

Shan-Yu and the Huns dig themselves out of the snow and begin to travel towards the Imperial City for an attack. Mulan goes to Shang to warn him of the impending attack ("Written in Stone – Reprise"), but she is ignored. The Chinese people have gathered at the Emperor's Palace to celebrate the Huns defeat, however in the festivities, Shan-Yu is able to kidnap the Emperor. After Mulan convinces Shang to listen to her plan to save the Emperor, she tasks Shang, Yao, Ling, and Qian-Po to dress as women in order to sneak into the palace ("Keep 'Em Guessin' – Reprise"). The men, Mushu, and Mulan split up. The men save the Emperor while Mulan fights and defeats Shan-Yu and Mushu signals the Chinese army to attack the palace, resulting in the retreat of the Huns. The Emperor commends Mulan for her bravery ("A Girl Worth Fighting For – Reprise"). Mulan returns home and is welcomed back by Fa Zhou. She is visited by Shang who comes with the intention of becoming her suitor. Mushu is rewarded for helping Mulan bring honor to the Fa Family by the ancestors who promote him to Family Guardian ("Honor to Us All – Finale," "Keep 'Em Guessin' – Bows").

== Differences from the 1998 Film ==
The musical closely follows the plot of the Disney film. However:

- Shang dresses as a woman in the musical in order to sneak into the Emperor's Palace but he remains dressed as a man in this section of the movie
- Qian-Po is called Chien-Po in the film
- The scene where Mulan bathes with Yao, Ling, and Chien-Po in the film is removed in Mulan Jr.

Further changes can be seen in the musical numbers:

- The musical revives the songs "Written in Stone" and "Keep 'em Guessing", two deleted songs from the 1998 film.
- "I'll Make a Man Out of You", a song featured in the 1998 Mulan film, is combined with "Lesson Number One", a song which was featured in Mulan II (2004), in a musical number in the portion of the musical's plot which corresponds to the "I'll Make a Man Out of You" sequence in the 1998 film.
- The songs "Honor to Us All", "Reflection", and "Girl Worth Fighting For", all featured in the Disney film, are adapted and reprised in the musical.

== Roles ==
- Mulan - A young woman who disguises herself as a man to take her father's place in the army and saves the Emperor
- Ancestors - The ancestors of the Fa family
  - Laozi - Represents honour
  - Lin - Represents loyalty
  - Zhang - Represents strength
  - Hong - Represents destiny
  - Yun - Represents love
- Mushu - A Chinese dragon demoted family guardian of the Fa Family
- Cri-Kee - A cricket is lucky bug
- Fa Zhou - Mulan's father
- Fa Li - Mulan's mother
- Grandmother Fa - Mulan's grandmother
- The Matchmaker - The local matchmaker who judges Mulan
- Shang - A Chinese army captain. The superior officer of Mulan, Yao, Ling, and Qian-Po
- Chi Fu - A member of the Chinese Emperor's council and advisor to Shang
- Shan-Yu - The leader of the Huns
- Yao - A Chinese soldier who befriends Ling, Qian-Po, and Mulan
- Ling - A Chinese soldier who befriends Yao, Qian-Po, and Mulan
- Qian-Po - A Chinese soldier who befriends Ling, Yao, and Mulan
- The Emperor- Ruler of China who honors Mulan
- Ensemble

== Musical Numbers ==
Written in Stone (Part one) - Ancestors

Written in Stone (Part two) - Fa Zhou, Yun, Fa Li, Grandmother Fa, Lin, Laozi, Hong, Ensemble

Written in Stone (Part three) - Ancestors and Ensemble

Honor to Us All (Part one) - Fa Zhou, Mulan, Ancestors, Fa Li, Grandmother Fa

Honor to Us All (Part two) - Mulan, Grandmother Fa, Ensemble

Honor to Us all (Part three) - Hong, Lin, Laozi, Yun, Fa Zhou, Mulan

Reflection -Mulan, Ancestors, Fa Li, Grandmother Fa, Fa Zhou

Written in Stone (Reprise) - Mushu, Ancestors, Mulan, Fa Zhou

Honor to Us All (Reprise) - Mushu

Keep 'Em Guessin' (Part one) - Mushu, Mulan, Ensemble

Keep 'Em Guessin' (Part two) - Mulan, Mushu, Ensemble

I'll Make a Man Out of You/Lesson No. 1 - Shang, Qian-Po, Yao, Ling, Mushu, Mulan

A Girl Worth Fighting For - Ling, Mulan, Yao, Qian- Po, Mushu, Chi-Fu, Ensemble, Shang

A Girl Worth Fighting For (Reprise) - Mulan, Ensemble

Written In Stone/Reflection (Reprise) - Mulan and Ancestors

Written In Stone (Reprise) - Mushu and Mulan

Keep 'Em Guessin' (Reprise) - Shang, Mulan, Yao, Ling, Qian-Po, Mushu

A Girl Worth Fighting For (Reprise)/Coming Home - Emperor, Shang, Yao, Ling, Qian-Po, Mulan, Fa Zhou

Honor to Us All (Finale) - Company

Keep 'Em Guessin' (Bows) - Company
