= I'll Make a Man Out of You =

Song from Disney's Mulan

"l'll Make a Man Out of You"

Song by Donny Osmond

from the album Mulan: An Original Walt Disney Records Soundtrack
- Released: June 2, 1998
- Genre: Pop
- Length: 3:21
- Label: Walt Disney
- Composer: Matthew Wilder
- Lyricist: David Zippel
- Producer: Matthew Wilder

"I'll Make a Man Out of You" is a song written by composer Matthew Wilder and lyricist David Zippel for Walt Disney Pictures' animated film Mulan (1998). Appearing on the film's soundtrack Mulan: An Original Walt Disney Records Soundtrack, "I'll Make a Man Out of You" is performed by American singer Donny Osmond as the singing voice of Captain Li Shang in lieu of American actor BD Wong, who provides the character's speaking voice. The song also features contributions from Lea Salonga as the singing voice of Mulan, Eddie Murphy as Mushu, and Harvey Fierstein, Jerry Tondo and Wilder himself as Yao, Chien-Po and Ling, respectively. In addition, Mushu has a speaking line unlike the other characters in the song.

"I'll Make a Man Out of You" was written to replace the song "We'll Make a Man of You" after the film's original songwriter Stephen Schwartz departed from the project in favor of working on DreamWorks' The Prince of Egypt (1998). Wilder and Zippel were inspired to complete the song after conceiving its ironic title, and the initial draft of the track was immediately approved by Disney. Prior to Mulan, Osmond had auditioned for the role of Hercules in Disney's Hercules (1997), a role for which he was ultimately turned down by the directors because they felt that he sounded too old. Disney eventually cast Osmond as the singing voice of Shang because his singing voice is similar to Wong's speaking voice. An up-tempo military-style song that incorporates both Eastern and Western musical styles, "I'll Make a Man Out of You" is performed by Shang during a rigorous training montage in which his young, inexperienced soldiers attempt to justify their worth. The song's title is considered ironic because Mulan, who relies on intelligence, ultimately proves more competent than her male comrades, including Captain Li Shang, who takes a liking to her, while its lyrics explore hyper-masculinity contradicted with Mulan's gender.

"I'll Make a Man Out of You" has received mostly positive reviews from film and music critics, some of whom dubbed it the film's best song, while praising Osmond's performance. Critics have also drawn comparisons between the song and Disney's Hercules, while likening Mulan's role and transformation to actress Demi Moore's performance as Lieutenant Jordan O'Neil in the film G. I. Jane (1997). The song has since appeared on several "best of" Disney songs lists, including those of Total Film and the New York Post. Discussed by film critics, film historians, academic journalists and feminists, the song has gone on to be recorded and covered in several different languages—namely Mandarin, Cantonese and Spanish—by entertainers Jackie Chan and Cristian Castro, respectively. Commercially, although the song was not released as a single and did not chart, it was certified 3× Platinum by the Recording Industry Association of America (RIAA) for equivalent sales of 3,000,000 units in the United States. It was also certified Gold by the British Phonographic Industry (BPI) for equivalent sales of 400,000 units in the United Kingdom.

== Writing and recording ==
"I'll Make a Man Out of You" was written by composer Matthew Wilder and lyricist David Zippel, who were hired to write Mulan's songs because Disney was interested in recruiting songwriters "that ... would give kind of a different sound to each of the songs." While Zippel, a Broadway lyricist, was recruited because the directors were impressed with his work on Disney's Hercules (1997), at the time Wilder, a pop singer, had been best known for his song "Break My Stride". Bancroft believes that, although the songwriters "had two different sensibilities ... the blend [of their styles] worked well together, especially on ['I'll Make a Man Out of You']".

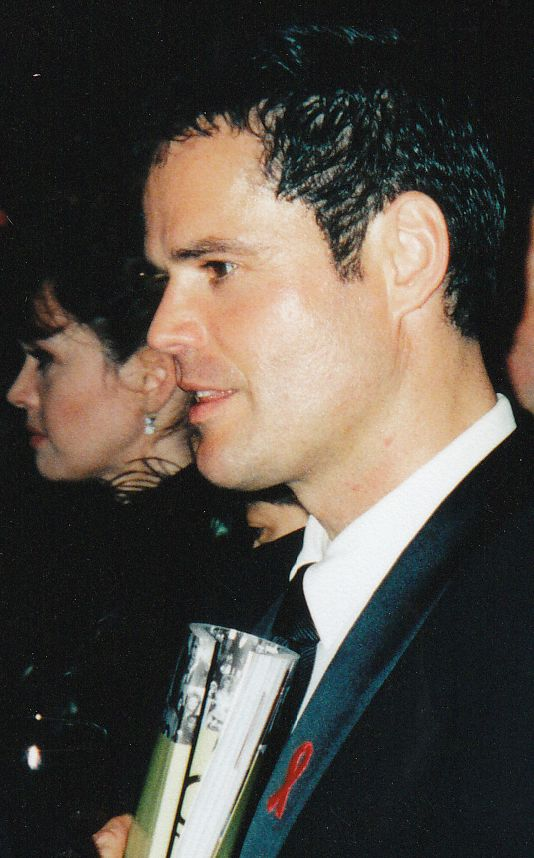
The directors cast American singer Donny Osmond as the singing voice of Shang because he and BD Wong share similar voices; Osmond had auditioned for the role of Hercules in Disney's Hercules, for which he was turned down because he sounded "too old".

Songwriter Stephen Schwartz was originally slated to write lyrics for Mulan until he was replaced by Zippel "at the last moment." Schwartz had written a song called "We'll Make a Man of You" for the scene in which Mulan is training to be a soldier. The song was ultimately replaced with Wilder and Zippel's "I'll Make a Man Out of You" when Schwartz was forced to resign from Mulan by Disney executives Peter Schneider and Michael Eisner because the songwriter had also agreed to score rival studio DreamWorks' animated film The Prince of Egypt (1998). Wilder and Zippel first conceived the song's title, which then inspired them to write its lyrics and music. Zippel identified determining the song's ironic title as the moment "he knew he'd hit on something great" by "contrasting Mulan's gender with the concept of what it means to be a man." The songwriters were hoping to create an original version of a training montage that was funny without being obvious, while remaining in character at all times. In an unlikely situation, the filmmakers universally enjoyed the song from its very first draft.

Wilder described himself as using "an everything-and-the-kitchen-sink approach" to composing its music, explaining, "I knew I wanted it to sound large and I knew what the tempo and the cadence of the piece was." Combining Eastern and Western styles, Wilder borrowed "drum cadences from traditional Chinese drums and then marrying that with military snares", upon which he continued building until "it became this cacophonous effect of a Chinese marching American band". Wilder and Zippel decided to incorporate drums into the track to demonstrate a sense of masculinity and musculature, identifying the song as very odd in structure but appropriate for its lyrics. Zippel's incorporation of "naturalistic descriptions of masculinity" into the song's lyrics – raging fire, coursing river, great typhoon – was used in an attempt to "get inside Shang's head space", elaborating, "I was just trying to be in character for the captain and how an Asian captain would lead his group differently than how a Western captain would call his troops," identifying as an opportunity "to put some specificity into it." Wilder recorded the song's demo himself, which was arranged into a composition featuring a 100-piece orchestra and male choir conducted by musician Paul Buckmaster.

Before Mulan, American singer Donny Osmond had auditioned for the lead role in Hercules, a role for which he was ultimately not cast because the directors felt that his voice sounded "too old" and "too deep" for the character. Osmond later revealed in an interview with People that he was so embarrassed by his Hercules audition that he had nearly considered ending his singing career prematurely. A few months later, Disney contacted Osmond with interest in casting him as the singing voice of Shang after comparing his audition tapes to BD Wong and determining that both actors have "very similar voices." In one scene, Osmond's character, Shang, is hit in the stomach while singing "I'll Make a Man Out of You". In order to sound as realistic as possible, Osmond punched himself in the stomach several times while recording the song.

== Context and use in Mulan ==
"I'll Make a Man Out of You" is performed by Captain Li Shang during Mulan's training montage, which has also been identified as the film's "boot camp sequence." The scene explores Shang's attempt to train his newly recruited squadron of incompetent soldiers in the hopes of ultimately transforming them into a skilled army. Occupying a significant portion of the film's plot, Shang promises to turn his team of "rag-tag recruits" into men, implying that they are merely boys unless they learn to fight while entirely unaware that Mulan is a woman. The musical number is used to "compress dramatic time or narrate" in a more compelling way than had solely dialogue been used. The scene begins with Shang shooting an arrow into the top of a tall pole and challenging all of his soldiers to retrieve it, each of whom fail until Mulan eventually succeeds. According to the book Into the Closet: Cross-Dressing and the Gendered Body in Children's Literature and Film by Victoria Flanagan, Mulan is successful in retrieving the arrow because she uses "an ingenuity that is based upon her ability to incorporate aspects of femininity into her masculine performance." By the end of the scene, all of the soldiers have improved dramatically and the results of their practice and training are finally revealed. In what Joshua and Judges author Athalya Brenner called "a humorous reversal toward the end of the movie," Mulan and her male comrades disguise themselves as concubines in order to infiltrate the palace and rescue the emperor while "I'll Make a Man Out of You" reprises in the background.

Screenshot of Mulan (left), disguised as "Ping", being reprimanded by Shang (right) during the "I'll Make a Man Out of You" sequence due to her incompetence.

Critics have observed ways in which the scene explores Mulan's growth and transformation as the character evolves from a clumsy, inexperienced recruit into one of the army's most skilled soldiers, in spite of her gender. According to the book Literacy, Play and Globalization: Converging Imaginaries in Children's Critical and Cultural Performances, the montage depicts Mulan's gender as "an obstacle to overcome." Author Phyllis Frus wrote in her book Beyond Adaptation: Essays on Radical Transformations of Original Works, "The need for inexperienced young men to go through a rigorous training results in a sequence common to many films," and that the scene "shows the challenges Ping/Mulan faces due to her" inexperience. As observed by Juanita Kwok in the book Film Asia: New Perspectives on Film for English, the irony of the scene lies within the fact that "Mulan proves herself more competent than any of the men." The author also observed that the scene's first refrain accompanies shots of Shang, while its second "coincides with Mulan climbing to the top of the pole." Additionally, while the earlier, all-female musical number "Honor to Us All" "functions as an account of the constructedness of female gender," "I'll Make a Man Out of You" "juxtaposes and makes explicit the contention that gender is a cultural product," according to Johnson Cheu, author of Diversity in Disney Films: Critical Essays on Race, Ethnicity, Gender, Sexuality and Disability. The Representation of Gender in Walt Disney's "Mulan" believes that the song emphasizes desirable masculine traits, namely "discipline ... tranquility, celerity, strength and fearlessness," while Shang, according to Putting the Grail Back into Girl Power: How a Girl Saved Camelot, and why it Matters, "views [femininity] as comparable to weakness." In her article Disney's "Mulan"—the "True" Deconstructed Heroine?, Lisa Brocklebank argued the song explores themes such as othering, ostracism and abjection. Hannah Yasharoff, writing for USA Today, believes Mulan is used to counter the idea that masculinity is "the only way to become strong enough to win the war".

Comparing the song to other training sequences such as Private Benjamin (1980), Wilder explained that the filmmakers "were trying to marry the idea of that hyper-masculinity as if it were a Marine moment, but instead of it being Marines, it was the Chinese army." Critics have drawn similarities between the "I'll Make a Man Out of You" sequence and Hercules' training montage in Disney's Hercules (1997), as well as actress Demi Moore's role as Lieutenant Jordan O'Neil in the film G. I. Jane (1997). In the book Ways of Being Male: Representing Masculinities in Children's Literature, author John Stephens wrote that although both Mulan and Hercules depict "the active male body as spectacle," Mulan's is less "straight-forward" due to the character's gender. Michael Dequina of The Movie Report observed that "Mulan's transformation is highly reminiscent of Demi Moore's in last year's Disney drama G.I. Jane, but Mulan oneups that film's hour-long toughening process by efficiently covering the same ground during a single, rousing musical number."

== Music and lyrics ==
I'll Make a Man Out of You
A twenty-nine second sample of "I'll Make a Man Out of You".

Written in common time at a tempo of 114 beats per minute and sung in the key of E minor, "I'll Make a Man Out of You" has been identified as a "heroic power ballad" and anthem that features an upbeat, "thumping" rhythm. Wilder himself has identified "I'll Make a Man Out of You" as "a very odd pop song". The Disney Song Encyclopedia described the song as a "rhythmic military song." Beginning with "a military-style drum" introduction, "I'll Make a Man Out of You", which is immediately preceded by the emotional ballad "Reflection" on the film's soundtrack album, "breaks up the slower pace of the songs," according to Filmtracks.com. Similar to the song "A Girl Worth Fighting For", the "ironically titled" "I'll Make a Man Out of You" "play[s] off Mulan's secret" because Shang is unaware that she is actually a girl, as observed by Jeffrey Gantz of The Phoenix. Johnson Cheu, author of Diversity in Disney Films: Critical Essays on Race, Ethnicity, Gender, Sexuality and Disability, received the song as a counterpart to the all-female musical number "Honor to Us All". Going into the last verse, the song's key shifts up to F minor and later towards the end, "the backing track falls into silence and [Osmond's] vocals come to the fore." Osmond's vocal range spans one octave, from D_{3} to G#_{4}. Beginning with two verses, followed by a bridge, a refrain, a final verse and repeated choruses, the song is a total of three minutes and twenty-one seconds in length.

Entertainment Weekly identified the number as the film's "rambunctious peak." According to Victoria Flanagan, author of Into the Closet: Cross-Dressing and the Gendered Body in Children's Literature and Film, "I'll Make a Man Out of You" is "a playful parody of conventional masculinity." USA Today's Hannah Yasharoff described the song as "a tongue-in-cheek comment on sexism". Lyrically, Zippel described the track as a song about "hyper-masculinity" that is disturbed by "the whole idea of Mulan", identifying the song as an opportunity "to have those two issues head-to-head." The lyric "I'll make a man out of you" is constantly repeated and reinforced by Shang. According to author John Stephens of Ways of Being Male: Representing Masculinities in Children's Literature, the song's lyrics "initially define masculinity in opposition to femininity," with its first verse beginning, Let's get down to business To defeat the Huns / Did they send me daughters / When l asked for sons ?" Its chorus reads, Be a man We must be swift as the coursing river / Be a man With all the force of a great typhoon / Be a man With all the strength of a raging fire / Mysterious as the dark side of the moon " which, according to Ways of Being Male, "essentializes masculinity by asserting that it embodies the speed, strength and power of the natural world, and yet contains this within an aura of tranquility and mystery." According to Beyond Adaptation: Essays on Radical Transformations of Original Works, these lyrics "add a hint of darkness as they celebrate male prowess" by suggesting that one who has "acquired fiery strength" is also "untamed as the moon's dark side." According to The Phoenix, Osmond performs the song's lyrics with "grit." Meanwhile, the singer is backed up by a macho-sounding choir repeatedly chanting "Be a man!", a call and response preceded by three chords intertwined with lyrics such as "you must be swift as the coursing river" and "with all the force of a great typhoon." Entertainment Weekly's Maureen Lee Lenker identified the "Be a man" chorus as the song's most iconic moment.

== International versions ==
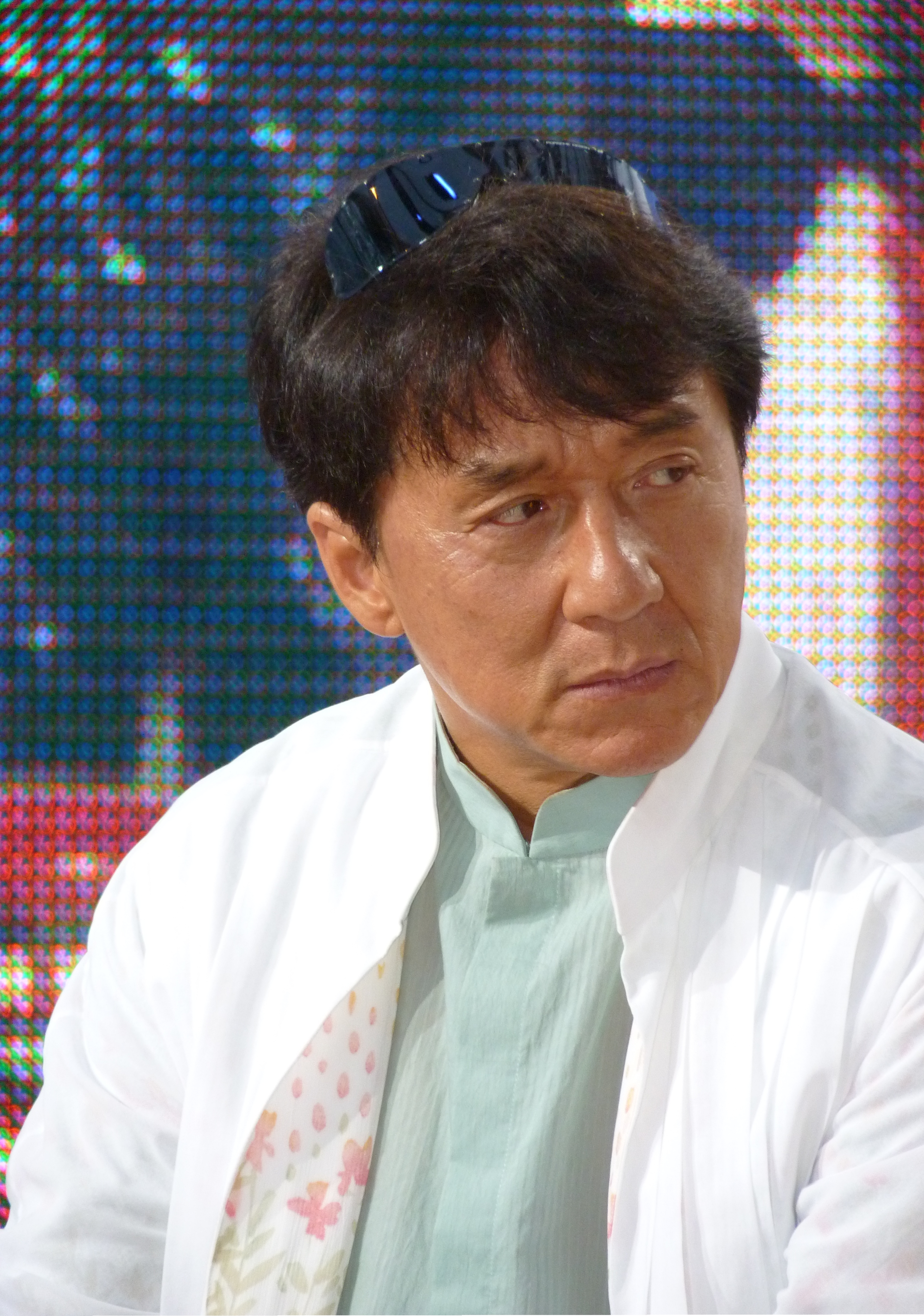
Hong Kong actor Jackie Chan dubbed the song in Mandarin and Cantonese for the film's editions released in Taiwan, Hong Kong and China; Chan's rendition has been met with generally positive reviews.

Hong Kong actor Jackie Chan was hired to dub the voice of Shang and record "I'll Make a Man Out of You" in Mandarin and Cantonese. The special edition DVD release of Mulan features a music video of Chan performing the song. The video also depicts Chan performing martial arts-inspired choreography. Positively received, Scott Chitwood of ComingSoon.net called Chan's rendition "a fun addition for Chan fans," while Nancy Churnin of The Dallas Morning News wrote that he performed the song "very ably."

The special edition DVD release of the movie also features a multi-lingual version of the song "I'll Make a Man Out of You" sung in 16 of the 30 versions originally released for the movie.

== Critical response ==
"I'll Make a Man Out of You" has been met with mostly positive reviews from both film and music critics. Irving Tan of Sputnikmusic wrote, "there hasn't been a single chorus in all of post-Mulan pop music that has managed to rival the roaring power in the refrain." Scott Chitwood of ComingSoon.net reviewed "I'll Make a Man Out of You" as "a stirring, testosterone filled piece," describing the scene as "amusing." Owen Gleiberman of Entertainment Weekly wrote that the song "has a comparable infectious punch," concluding, "it's the only song in the movie that escapes Disneyfied blandness." Jeff Vice of the Deseret News observed that Wong and Osmond's "voices sound eerily similar." Tom Henry of The Blade enjoyed Osmond's delivery, describing the singer's performance as "solid." Lloyd Paseman of The Register-Guard called "I'll Make a Man Out of You" a favorite of his. While exploring "The History of Movie Training Montages", Chris Giblin of Men's Fitness opined, "Mulan served as proof that the fitness montage can work amazingly well in movies for kids." Giblin continued, "it has the best lyrics of any serious fitness/sports montage song. Overall, a very strong montage." Disney.com itself cites "I'll Make a Man Out of You" as a "song that was so epic, so legendary, that it requires an out loud sing along anytime we hear it."

Despite dubbing the film's songs its "weak link," TV Guide wrote that the musical numbers are "crafted with a knowing, almost camp wink that's totally in keeping with the subtext of the film," concluding that "I'll Make a Man Out of You" sounds like a Village People song. Writing for The Seattle Times, Moira Macdonald criticized Wilder and Zippel's songs as "forgettable," calling "I'll Make a Man Out of You" "annoying." The Phoenix's Jeffrey Gantz wrote that "Donny Osmond shows some grit, but he's still the voice of the Whitebread West." Amazon.ca's Jason Verlinde commented, "Unfortunately, the voice of Donny Osmond, relegated to anthems such as 'I'll Make a Man Out of You' doesn't really enhance the story line".

== Live performances and covers ==
In April 2017, Osmond performed "I'll Make a Man Out of You" live on the 24th season of the reality television competition Dancing with the Stars, the ninth season of which Osmond himself had won. Part of the season's Disney-themed episode, Osmond's performance accompanied singer Normani and professional dancer Val Chmerkovskiy's pasodoble. The competitors were ultimately he highest-scoring couple of the evening, earning a score of 49 from the judges.

In October 2014, a parody of "I'll Make a Man Out of You" was uploaded to YouTube entitled "I'll Make a 'Mon Out of You" by YouTuber Esquirebob. A mashup of Mulan and the popular Pokémon franchise, the video features Digimon Gatomon attempting to masquerade as Pokémon Meowth in lieu of Mulan, while Ash occupies the role of Shang as his trainer, according to Smosh. Another parody of the song, based on the Dragon Ball franchise was uploaded to YouTube by TeamFourStar. Although the 2020 remake of Mulan leaves out, "I'll Make a Man Out of You," a fanedit by Blue Hippo Films uses the movie's new training scenes to convincingly add the song back.

On April 16, 2020, Donny Osmond gave an at-home performance of the song during The Disney Family Singalong.

== Impact and legacy ==
Total Film ranked "I'll Make a Man Out of You" twenty-ninth on its list of the "30 Best Disney Songs". Similarly, M ranked the song twentieth on its list of the "Top 20 Disney Songs of All Time". Author Stephanie Osmanski cited "Did they send me daughters when I asked for sons?" as her favourite lyric. PopSugar ranked the song the nineteenth "Catchiest Disney Song". In 2012, Entertainment Weekly readers voted the song 18th on their list of 20 all-time greatest Disney songs. Osmond himself acknowledged the accomplishment in a Facebook post, writing, "In my grandkids' eyes, this is easily my greatest accomplishment yet." Comedy Central Josh Pappenheim called "I'll Make a Man Out of You" "one of the most iconic Disney songs of all time". Hannah Yasharoff, writing for USA Today, dubbed the track "an iconic moment in pop culture."

On Empire's list of the twenty "Most Awesome Training Montages In Cinema History", "I'll Make a Man Out of You" was ranked 14th. The author identified it as "a solid training montage in which Mulan and her friends go from hapless duffers to fearless warriors in just over two minutes." Similarly, Men's Fitness also ranked "I'll Make a Man Out of You" among the greatest training montages in film history. Stephen Fiorentine of Sneaker Report wrote that "Training montages aren't limited to just live-action movies. With movies like Mulan and Hercules, Disney mastered the art of the montage in their animated films."

In 2018, Entertainment Weekly contributor Maureen Lee Lenker wrote that the song has successfully "endured since the film's release" and remained "a perennial favorite" despite being more upbeat than typical Disney songs. Actress Daisy Ridley said that she listens to the song to prepare for action sequences in film roles, particularly for her performance in Star Wars: The Force Awakens (2015). Ridley explained that the song "makes me feel empowered" and revive her energy, comparing her character Rey finding her strength to Mulan. Media publications have lamented the fact that the 2020 live-action adaptation of the film might not include any songs, particularly "I'll Make a Man Out of You", with Yasharoff writing, "Any excuse to make that song relevant again is more than welcome," and ranking the song second on their reasons "Why the live-action version should replicate the animated musical". While the song itself was not sung in the live-action film, lines from it were repeated during Mulan's training at the camp as a rallying call for the recruits.

== Credits and personnel ==
Credits adapted from the website Discogs.

- Donny Osmond – lead vocals
- Lea Salonga, Eddie Murphy, Harvey Fierstein, Jerry Tondo and Matthew Wilder – additional vocals
- Matthew Wilder – songwriting and producing
- David Zippel – songwriting

== Certifications ==
Region	Certification	Certified units/sales
New Zealand (RMNZ)	Gold	15,000^{‡}
United Kingdom (BPI) Sales since 2004	Platinum	600,000^{‡}
United States (RIAA)	3× Platinum	3,000,000^{‡}
^{‡} Sales+streaming figures based on certification alone.
