= Keep 'Em Guessing =

1998 song in the animated film Mulan

"Keep 'Em Guessing" is a song written for the 1998 animated film Mulan. The song was to be sung by Mushu and performed by Eddie Murphy. It was written by Matthew Wilder and David Zippel. It was restored for the stage musical adaption Mulan Jr.

== Production ==
=== Writing ===
The dragon guardian Mushu was written as an integral part of Mulan, and as such had various songs written for him during production. Keep 'Em Guessing reached the recording phase, and Billy Porter lent his vocal talents to the demo. The song sees Mushu advising Mulan on how to keep her real identity secret while she pretends to be a male soldier. Lyrics included advice like “[put on] an act that’s so convincing, they’ll think you’re a dude.”

=== Reworking ===
According to songwriters David Zippel and Matthew Wilder, Disney and the production team were "very fond" of the song, and called Porter's demo "phenomenal". However, Murphy reportedly refused to sing, so the songwriters suggested he try a comedic "talk-sing" through the number similar to his work as James Brown on Saturday Night Live, however Murphy declined. Zippel later said: "We wrote three different versions of it. But that's because we didn't understand at that point that it wasn't that [Eddie Murphy] wasn't liking our songs, he just didn't want to sing in the film."

=== Removal ===
The song, intended to be Mushu's introduction to Mulan, but ultimately was cut and replaced by expositional spoken dialogue and they decided the character could show who he was with only a few words. It became one of a few songs written for Mushu that were cut.

=== Aftermath ===
The song was restored for the stage musical adaption Mulan Jr.

== Critical reception ==
Radio Times wrote "we can’t help but wonder how that version of the movie would have played out". CinemaBlend noted that without this number, the only time Mushu sings is in the line "This guy's got 'em scared to death" during "I'll Make a Man Out of You." Band Wagon felt the song's deletion was a "shame" because the "jazzy number is so unbelievably smooth".
