= Marianna Cataldi =

Italian composer

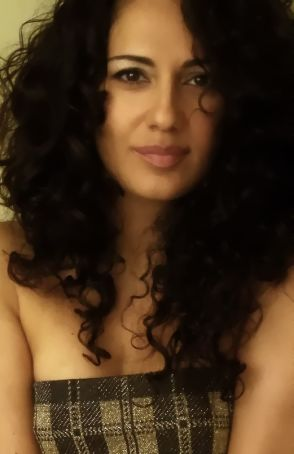
Marianna Cataldi

Marianna Cataldi is an Italian singer-songwriter and composer.

== Life and career ==
=== 1976–1993: Early life ===
Marianna Cataldi was born and raised in Taranto, Italy. She started performing live on stage when she was only 4, singing children's songs, folk Italian music and international pop. In 1980 she began studying piano and in 1983 she began writing her own songs. She studied at the Conservatory of Taranto "G. Paisiello" : music theory, piano, choral singing, and singing (under the guidance of voice teacher Giacomo Colafelice). After studying opera Marianna acquired a particular vocal style and she discovered to be a mezzo-soprano in classical music but a soprano in pop music. In 1994 during a jam session at Santa Tecla in Milan, she was discovered by Michele Forzani, a producer of a small label (SYNTHESIS), who decided to produce her self-titled debut album in which she wrote all the tracks and that features the song "TUA MAI", co-written with Mario Rosini. After her first record, she released a vinyl featuring the acclaimed remix of Kate Bush's "Wuthering Heights", and also the song "Dangerous Time" which she wrote. In 1995 she moved to Milan and in 1996 she started to collaborate with the Italian composer Silvio Amato who helped her starting to work with the networks of Mediaset s.p.a.

=== 1994–1997: Career beginnings ===
During 1996 and 1997 she performed as a lead singer in songs from many TV spots, TV shows theme songs and radio jingles, she covered several Christmas and classic love songs featured in compilations and she also performed as a backup singer in various musical soundtracks, TV shows theme songs and orchestras.

=== 1998–present: Solo career ===
In 1998 Walt Disney Pictures chose her to perform in the Italian version of the American animated film Mulan, where she performed the songs "Riflesso" and "Molto Onore Ci Darai". In 1999 she performed the song "In Your Eyes", written by Silvio Amato, theme music of the movie Senza Movente (Warner Bros.) then she participated in Gino Landi’s tv show "Tiramisù" presented by Pippo Baudo, broadcast on Canale 5. In 2000 she participated as the lead singer in the five episodes of Pierfrancesco Pingitore's TV show "La Canzone del Secolo" presented by Pippo Baudo, broadcast on Canale 5.

In 2004 she composed and recorded the theme song for "Prima o Poi", a quiz show broadcast on Rai 2.

In 2005 she composed and produced the background music for the TV show "Screensaver" broadcast on Rai 3. She performed on Rai 2’s reality show L'isola dei famosi tv song, broadcast every year since 2004.

In 2009 she released her single I Need You To Survive (self-written and composed) which was included in the Italian soundtrack of the horror movie 2012: L'avvento del male (20th Century Fox), she then performed the romanza "Genti Du Suli", featured in the soundtrack of Marco Ottavio Graziano's docu-film "Emigranti" (Rai Trade). In 2010 she released her second album "Art in Heart", a collection of some of her soundtracks, featuring two unreleased tracks. Marianna Cataldi currently composes and produces instrumental tracks for SOUNDIVA MUSIC LIBRARY and she writes and composes songs for other artists. Marianna has been vocal coach for over a decade and she has also collaborated as vocal coach in productions such as Disney Channel Italy ’s Life Bites and Italia 1’s Colorado.
