= Darrell Rooney =

Canadian animator

- Occupations: Animator, storyboard artist, director
- Years active: 1978–present

Darrell Rooney is a Canadian animator, storyboard artist, and director for The Walt Disney Company, best known for directing The Lion King II: Simba's Pride (1998) and Mulan II (2004) at Disneytoon Studios. He started at Disney in 1978, and worked as a visual effects animator on Tron (1982).

He was nominated for an Annie Award in 2001 for Outstanding Individual Achievement for Directing in an Animated Feature Production for directing Lady and the Tramp II: Scamp's Adventure.

== Filmography ==
Year	Title	Role	Notes
1982	Tron	Visual effects animator	
1998	The Lion King II: Simba's Pride	Director	with Rob LaDuca
2001	Lady and the Tramp II: Scamp's Adventure	Director	with Jeannine Roussel
2004	Mulan II	Director	with Lynne Southerland
