= Silvio Amato =

Italian composer

Silvio Amato (born April 10, 1961, in Catania, Italy), is a composer of classical, contemporary and popular music, and film soundtracks. Currently, he resides in Marina del Rey, CA with his family. He previously resided in Boston, Massachusetts and maintains a studio in Milan, Italy

== Early life ==
Amato is son of a distributor of children's clothing and a mother who did not care much for classical music. The used piano his father brought home to "fill space" in the family's living room soon became an obsession for young Silvio who learned the instrument on his own despite his mother's constant pleas "I beg you Silvio, please, please, please stop playing." Eventually, he studied classical piano with a master teacher.

Moving north to Milan as a young man, he established himself as a composer and arranger, working with a variety of popular and light classical artists as well as composing for television and motion pictures. It has been said that "his approachable music captures the vibrancy and romanticism of contemporary Italian culture, appealing to devotees of popular and classical genres alike."

== Works ==
In 2008, shortly after his oldest daughter left home to study at Boston University in the United States, The Vatican commissioned him to compose a modern opera that would tie together common religious themes found in Christianity, Judaism and Islam. Soon he and his wife and two younger children moved to Boston as well. "What more inspirational place than the birthplace of America – the melting pot of the people and religions of the world—to write music about spiritual concepts that unite people of faith?" he said in biography published at the Illuminessence website.

In Milan he wrote Love, One Love for Mina Maria Quaini that was released in May 2010 and reached the top of the charts in Italy. He wrote Le Mama, performed by teen Francesco Pugliese, a finalist in 2010 series of Italian TV talent show Io Canto (I Sing).

In 2010 and 2011, he updated and transformed a never-before-performed music of an unknown Massachusetts composer, the late Walter Horvitz, into a musical currently titled Can't You See That I Am In Love.

His light classical musical score for the fable The Happy Prince was performed by the La Scala Instrumental Ensemble of Milan (a chamber ensemble formed of key players in the Teatro alla Scala Orchestra). His ice ballets Snow White On Ice, Beauty and the Beast On Ice, and Peter Pan On Ice have been performed throughout Europe. Utah Regional Ballet in Provo, Utah used Amato's score for Peter Pan to choreograph a full ballet, which it debuted in early 2011.

The interfaith oratorio Illuminessence uniting the prayers and teachings of Christianity, Judaism and Islam, was scheduled to be premiered in Boston, Massachusetts on September 11, 2011, as part of the city's decennial commemoration of the September 11 attacks on America.

== Soundtracks ==
He had a 10-year collaboration with Mediaset composing thematic music for network news programs, situation comedies and soap operas. In addition, he was undertaken substantial assignments with mainstream Italian and international television networks: The Italian public television network RAI (Radiotelevisione Italiana), Telemontecarlo, La7 (Telcom Italia Media's entertainment network) and British Sky Broadcasting.

Amato has written soundtracks for motion pictures including Can't Hardly Wait with Mel Brooks, The Mythica by Carlo Vanzina, Ti Oglio Bene Eugenio with Giuliana De Sio and Giancarlo Giannini, and the film by Jerry Calà I Live Alone. In addition, Amato made major contributions to the epic documentary about Sicily, produced by Mediaset.
