= Wally Harper =

American musical director, composer and conductor (c. 1941–2004)

Wally Harper (c. 1941 – October 8, 2004) was an American musical director, composer, conductor, dance arranger, and musical supervisor for many Broadway and Off-Broadway productions. For three decades from the mid-1970s, he worked with Barbara Cook as pianist, music director and arranger.

== Early life and education ==
Harper was born in Akron, Ohio, in 1951. His mother was a music teacher, and by age 12 he was playing the piano in church. He graduated from the New England Conservatory and Juilliard School of Music, and first worked preparing vocal arrangements for the Broadway musical Half a Sixpence in 1965.

== Career ==
Harper composed two musicals, with book and lyrics by Sherman Yellen. The first was Say Yes! Which was produced at the Berkshire Theatre Festival, Stockbridge, Massachusetts in 2000. The second was Josephine Tonight!, which was produced (posthumously) by Theatre Building Chicago in 2006, and received praise from The Chicago Sun Times for his fine score.

He also composed the Off-Broadway musical, Sensations (1970), and several songs for Irene (1973), as well as dance music for the film, The Best Little Whorehouse in Texas (1982). Harper worked as musical director or arranger on Broadway musicals including A Day in Hollywood/A Night in The Ukraine (1980), Nine (1982) and My One and Only (1983). He produced the original cast recordings of those musicals, as well as the Pointer Sisters' revival of Ain't Misbehavin' and Tommy Tune's Slow Dancin'.

As a symphony conductor, Harper conducted such orchestras as the London Symphony Orchestra, the Royal Philharmonic, the BBC Orchestra, the Melbourne Symphony and the Philadelphia Orchestra. He performed at the White House for four administrations.

Donating his time and experience, Harper served as guest lecturer for the Juilliard School and the Broadway Musical Theatre Project with Tel Aviv University.

He began working with Barbara Cook in the mid-1970s as her musical director, accompanist and arranger. Their first major collaboration was a Carnegie Hall concert in January 1975. The two went on to play "clubs, theatres and concert halls worldwide." During Harper's collaboration with Cook, he arranged and conducted the CD, Oscar Winners: The Lyrics of Oscar Hammerstein II. He produced and arranged It's Better With a Band, for which he wrote the title song and The Disney Album, arranged for symphony orchestra. He co-produced Close as Pages in a Book, celebrating the lyrics of Dorothy Fields, Barbara Cook: Live from London, Barbara Cook at Carnegie Hall, As of Today, All I Ask of You, The Champion Season and the CD Barbara Cook Sings Mostly Sondheim. "Cook and Mr. Harper were one of the successful professional marriages in show business. Together, they created intimate piano-and-voice shows for boites and more lavish orchestral concerts for venues such as Carnegie Hall.

Harper died of cardiac arrest in New York October 8, 2004.

== Works ==
- Broadway
  - 1970 - Company (Musical Supervisor, Dance Arrangements)
  - 1973 - Irene (Incidental music, Dance arrangements and Assistant Conductor)
  - 1979 - The Grand Tour (Musical Direction)
  - 1979 - Peter Pan (Dance Arrangements)
  - 1980 - A Day in Hollywood/A Night in the Ukraine (Musical Director/Vocal and Dance Arranger)
  - 1980 - Brigadoon (musical director and Vocal arrangements)
  - 1982 - Nine (musical director)
  - 1983 - My One and Only (Musical Concept/Dance Arranger)
  - 1983 - 5-6-7-8...Dance! (Composer/Musical Supervisor)
  - 1984 - The Three Musketeers (Dance Arrangements)
  - 1987 - Barbara Cook: A Concert for the Theatre (Music arranged and conducted by/Original Songs (Music))
  - 1989 - Grand Hotel (Music Supervision/Additional Music)
  - 1992 - My Favorite Year (Dance Arrangements)
  - 1994 - The Best Little Whorehouse Goes Public (Musical Supervision/Vocal and Dance Arrangements)
  - 2002 - Mostly Sondheim (musical director, Arranger and Pianist)
  - 2004 - Barbara Cook's Broadway! (musical director and Pianist)
- Off-Broadway
  - 1968 - Up Eden (Orchestrations)
  - 1970 - Whispers on the Wind (Music Consultant)
  - 1970 - Sensations (Composer)
  - 1971 - Six (musical director)
  - 1974 - Once I Saw a Boy Laughing (Orchestrations)
  - 1977 - Landscape of the Body (Musical Arrangements, Incidental Music)
  - 2002 - Tommy Tune: White Tie and Tails (Arranger)
  - 2004 - Barbara Cook's Broadway (musical director, Piano)
