= A Girl Worth Fighting For =

Song by Matthew Wilder, Harvey Fierstein, Jerry Tondo, Lea Salonga and James Hong

from the album Mulan: An Original Walt Disney Records Soundtrack
- Released: June 2, 1998
- Length: 2:25
- Label: Walt Disney
- Composer: Matthew Wilder
- Lyricist: David Zippel
- Producer: Matthew Wilder

"A Girl Worth Fighting For" is a song written by composer Matthew Wilder and lyricist David Zippel from the 1998 Disney film Mulan. It is performed by Harvey Fierstein, Jerry Tondo, and James Hong, along with Wilder and Lea Salonga, who provide the singing voices of Ling and Mulan, respectively.

== Production ==
Lyricist David Zippel and composer Matthew Wilder were hired by Disney to write songs for Mulan, based on the belief that the pair could "give kind of different sound to each of the songs". Based on its ironic lyrics, the song is described by Wilder as "a comedy song".

"A Girl Worth Fighting For" ends suddenly when the military reinforcements discover an encampment burned to the ground. Zippel described the abrupt end of the song as "a really powerful moment"; Wilder noted that the song's ending "directly inspired and informed the narrative and how the animators would bring that moment to life".

During the recording process, Wilder provided the singing voice for the character Ling, when Gedde Watanabe was not able to provide adequate vocals for the song. Wilder cites his experience being the stand-in vocalist as "just so much fun and so unexpected".

== Synopsis ==
"A Girl Worth Fighting For" begins as the army of men march towards the battle. The song itself acts as a source of comic relief for the audience as the men sing about their dream girls and the roles they will play in the family to distract for their fatigue and pain. It also builds on Mulan's inability to play the role of a stereotypical male, adding suspense to the later reveal.

However, the song abruptly cuts off when Mulan and the men come across the sight of a destroyed village, caused by the Huns.

== Composition ==
"A Girl Worth Fighting For" is described as a "delightfully ironic comic number". It starts in the key of E major, and is written in alla breve with the tempo of a "walking march".

Some background instruments play some parts in a pentatonic scale, including the use of Chinese flute, representing the setting in China.

== Certifications ==
Region	Certification	Certified units/sales
United States (RIAA)	Gold	500,000^{‡}
^{‡} Sales+streaming figures based on certification alone.

== Critical reception ==
Arthur Hu for Asian Focus (Seattle) wrote "A Girl Worth Fighting For" sounds a bit like South Pacific's "There is Nothing Like a Dame" another hit musical comedy about war between Asian powers. Still, the songs stick with stereotypical gender themes, and they still promote the idea that guys have all the fun fighting and killing". Taestful Reviews wrote "A Girl Worth Fighting For" is as funny as Disney songs get, second to only "Gaston." Filmtracks.com wrote "the comical piece performed by Harvey Fierstein ("A Girl Worth Fighting For") proves that people with annoying speaking voices don't sound any better when they sing".

Michelle Anya Anjirbag, analyzing the song, described it as using the process of othering to highlight Mulan's contrast with her parent culture, and fulfilling the writers' goals of "disrupt[ing] Disney's pattern of heroines relying on a man".
