= List of Disney's Mulan characters =

The main characters in Mulan II. From left to right: Ling, Chien-Po, Yao, Shang, Mulan, Mushu, Cri-Kee, Su, Ting-Ting and Mei.

The following is a list of characters from Disney's 1998 film Mulan, its 2004 sequel Mulan II, and its 2020 remake Mulan.

== Fa/Hua family ==
In the 2020 film, the Fa family name is changed to Hua (花) in English. Hua is the Mandarin pinyin romanization of the same word as Fa, which was based on Cantonese romanization.

=== Mulan ===
Fa Mulan (speaking voice by Ming-Na Wen, singing voice provided by Lea Salonga, portrayed by Liu Yifei in the live-action film) is a young woman who, in place of her father Fa Zhou, enlists in the army as a man named Fa Ping. Despite the doubts of others, she defeats Shan Yu and his army and saves China, with the Emperor of China rewarding her for her efforts and China celebrating her return.

In the 2020 film, due to her surname being changed, Mulan assumes the pseudonym Hua Jun while in the army.

=== Fa Zhou ===
Fa Zhou (voiced by Soon-tek Oh, portrayed by Tzi Ma in the live-action film) is a war veteran who is Mulan's father and Li's husband and, though strict, values his family and their honor. Before Mulan leaves for war, he prays to their ancestors while she sees the matchmaker. When Chi-Fu calls him from the Fa family for military duty, he accepts despite his age and health. Fearing that Zhou is risking his life after having seen him collapse during sword practices, Mulan decides to enlist in his stead and he consoles Li after she leaves. When she returns home after defeating Shan Yu, she gives him Shan Yu's sword and the crest of the emperor, two gifts that honor the Fa family. However, he confesses that he only wanted her to be happy and safe, and that his greatest honor is having her as a daughter.

=== Fa Li ===
Fa Li (voiced by Freda Foh Shen, portrayed by Rosalind Chao in the live-action film) is Fa Zhou's wife and Mulan's mother. After Mulan gets hay in her hair, she sends her inside so the dressers can bathe and dress her in time for her meeting with the matchmaker, later consoling her when the matchmaker rejects her. Along with Grandmother Fa, she is shocked at Li Shang's arrival, as they never believed she would bring a man home. Mulan II reveals that the only other child she likes is Sha-Ron.

=== Grandmother Fa ===
Grandmother Fa (voiced by June Foray, singing voice provided by Marni Nixon) is Mulan's grandmother, who encourages her to find a husband and gives her an apple, pendant, jade necklace and Cri-Kee to make her look perfect. After Mulan leaves, she picks up a lantern and prays to the ancestors, awakening First Ancestor Fa. Along with Fa Li, she is shocked at Li Shang's arrival, as they never believed she would bring a man home. Despite this, she lets him stay for dinner. In Mulan II, she plays a game in the house of Fa and brings food for Mulan and Shang. The character is absent in the live-action adaptation, being replaced by Hua Xiu.

=== First Ancestor Fa ===
First Ancestor Fa (voiced by George Takei) is the eldest member of the Fa family and leader of the ancestors, who brings Mushu to life. When Mushu returns with Mulan, he restores his guardian position.

=== Other ancestors ===
Other ancestors (female ancestors voiced by Mary Kay Bergman in Mulan, Tress MacNeille in Mulan II) include a farmer and his wife, who are a parody of American Gothic; a counter who fiddles with his abacus; Fa Deng, whose head is cut off due to Mushu's misguidance to him when he was a guardian; and a woman whose great-granddaughter was a cross-dresser like Mulan.

=== Hua Xiu ===
In Mulan (2020), Hua Xiu (portrayed by Xana Tang) is Mulan's sister and Hua Zhou and Hua Li's daughter. She is based on Mulan's younger brother from The Ballad of Mulan and Mulan's younger sister in the Ming dynasty play Mulan Joins the Army.

== Chinese military ==
=== Li Shang ===
Captain/General Li Shang
- First appearance: Mulan (1998)
- Created by: Robert D. San Souci; Dean DeBlois
- Portrayed by: Donnie Yen and Yoson An (Live-action film)
- Voiced by: BD Wong (speaking); Donny Osmond (singing)

In-universe information
- Alias: Captain Shang; General Shang "Pretty Boy"; Commander Tung and Chen Honghui (Live-action film)
- Spouse: Mulan

Captain/General Li Shang is a captain of the Imperial Chinese army and captain of the Royal Guards of China. Though a capable leader dedicated to his cause, he can be too "by-the-book" and puts his duty above his feelings, in contrast to Mulan. He is also reserved and thoughtful, in contrast to Mulan's adventurous personality. In Mulan, Shang is appointed as an army captain by his father, a general, and befriends Ping after she saves his life. Though he learns she is actually a woman, which is forbidden by the empire's law and punishable by death, he spares her and helps her save the empire. Having fallen in love with her, he joins her family for dinner after she returns home.

In Mulan II, Shang proposes to Mulan, which she accepts, and is promoted from captain to general by the emperor, who orders him and Mulan to escort his three daughters to a conflicting kingdom in hopes that an arranged marriage between them will bring peace. Throughout the film, Mushu's meddling causes conflict in their relationship, and he seemingly dies after falling into a canyon. However, he is revealed to have survived, and Mushu and Cri-Kee pretend to be the Golden Dragon of Unity and free the princesses from their vows. Mulan and Shang later marry and combine their families' temples so that Mushu can remain Mulan's guardian.

In Chinese naming convention, personal names in Chinese, unlike Western names, present the family/clan name first. This convention was followed in Mulan, but not in Mulan II.

In video games, Shang appears in Kingdom Hearts II in the world Land of Dragons, reprising his role from Mulan. He also appears in Disney Magic Kingdoms, Disney Speedstorm, and the mobile game Disney Heroes: Battle Mode.

In the 2020 film, the character of Li Shang was dropped in response to the MeToo movement, due to the nature of a military conscript having a relationship with a commanding officer. Instead, Li's role was fulfilled by two newly separate characters: Commander Tung (portrayed by Donnie Yen), a mentor and teacher to Mulan who leads the Imperial Regiment; and Chen Honghui (portrayed by Yoson An), a recruit in Tung's unit and Mulan's ally and love interest.

=== Yao, Ling and Chien-Po ===
Yao, Ling and Chien-Po
- First appearance: Mulan (1998)
- Created by: Robert D. San Souci; Rita Hsiao; Dean DeBlois
- Portrayed by: Chen Tang (Yao); Jimmy Wong (Ling); Doua Moua (Chien-Po)
- Voiced by: Harvey Fierstein (Yao); Gedde Watanabe (Ling); Matthew Wilder (Ling's singing voice in Mulan); Jerry Tondo (Chien-Po)

Yao, Ling and Chien-Po are recruits in the army who train alongside Mulan and, after learning that she is a woman, aid her in stopping the surviving Huns by disguising themselves as concubines.

In Mulan II, after visiting the matchmaker, who fails to get a match for them, Mulan and Li Shang recruit them to escort the emperor's daughters to the Qui Gong princes they are engaged to. Along the way, they develop feelings for the princesses: Yao with Mei, Ling with Ting-Ting, and Chien-Po with Su, and take them to a carnival. After the princesses admit that their feelings are mutual and that they do not want to marry the princes, despite their duty, Mulan decides to offer herself to the royal family instead. After Mushu pretends to be the Great Golden Dragon of Unity, he commands that they are allowed to marry whoever they want, allowing them to be with Yao, Ling, and Chien-Po.

Yao, Ling, and Chien Po appear in Kingdom Hearts II as supporting characters in the world The Land of Dragons, reprising their roles from Mulan.

==== Yao ====
Yao is the self-appointed leader of the trio, who is arrogant and short-tempered (and short-statured to match, with a perpetually black eye and sideburns). His signature color is red in Mulan and purple in Mulan II. Though he initially picks on Mulan, he befriends her and helps her battle the Huns despite his clumsiness: his gruff exterior belies a deep devotion to his friends, as he explains the soldiers' jokes to Mulan during the song sequences and is distraught when his lifeline fails to reach her after the avalanche.

In Mulan II, he wants to marry a woman who would be impressed with his looks and his fighting ability. He falls in love with Princess Mei, the emperor's middle daughter, who accepts the idea that "my duty is to my heart". In his encounter, he puts the slipper back onto her foot and sets the table for her with oranges, baozi, and tea. He later gives her a stuffed panda bear after winning it at the carnival, and marries her after Mushu grants them permissions.

In the 2020 live-action remake, he is portrayed by Chen Tang. His gruff characteristics are kept, but he is portrayed as more jovial than his animated counterpart.

==== Ling ====
Ling is the group's slender middleman. His signature color is yellow in Mulan and blue in Mulan II. He is friendly, fun-loving, fond of joking around, and despite initially picking on Mulan, is the first to befriend her and helps her battle the Huns. Despite he and Yao's disagreements, he grows to accept him as their leader. He was the one who coined the phrase "a girl worth fighting for."

In Mulan II, he wants to marry a woman who would laugh at his jokes. He starts falling in love with Princess Ting-Ting, the eldest princess, as she is one of the few people who laughs at his jokes. At the carnival, when fireflies accidentally set off firecrackers that hit Ling, she laughs at his misfortune, but he thinks her laugh is cute. At the end, they are able to marry because of Mushu.

In the 2020 live-action remake, he is portrayed by Jimmy Wong. He is depicted as being much friendlier and adept at quoting poetry.

==== Chien-Po ====
Chien-Po, also known as Po, is the big, bald, burly member of the trio, towering over them and most of the other soldiers in the army. His signature color is blue in Mulan and green in Mulan II. Though calm, spiritual, gentle, and good-natured, he is slightly naïve and loves food. Despite his obesity, he possesses great physical strength, being able to lift multiple people and a massive stone statue with ease, and his appearance and serenity seem to be inspired by Buddhist imagery, given that he bears more than a passing resemblance to classical depictions of Budai.

In Mulan II, he wants to marry a woman who is good at cooking and preparing food. He later falls in love with Princess Su, the youngest of the three princesses, with the two bonding based on their love of food.

In the 2020 live-action remake, he is portrayed by Doua Moua. He lacks the calm and serene disposition of his animated counterpart, but retains the same love of food.

=== General Li ===
General Li (voiced by James Shigeta) was Li Shang's father and a high-ranking member of the Chinese army, who was killed along with his troops in a battle against the Hun army while trying to protect a village. After Li Shang and his battalion discover the village destroyed and the Chinese army wiped out, Chien-Po finds General Li's helmet and delivers it to Shang as proof of his death. Shang creates a makeshift shrine for his father using his sword and the helmet to honor him, while Mulan leaves a doll, which Shan Yu found and left behind in the village, at the shrine to honor the villagers killed in the attack.

=== Cricket ===
In Mulan (2020), Cricket (portrayed by Jun Yu) is a young soldier who joins the ranks of the Chinese army. Loosely based on Cri-Kee, he is depicted as being a skilled archer but otherwise clumsy.

== Animals/creatures ==
=== Mushu ===
Mushu
- First appearance: Mulan (1998)
- Created by: Robert D. San Souci
- Voiced by: Eddie Murphy (Mulan); Mark Moseley (Mulan II, Kingdom Hearts, House of Mouse, Disney's Arcade Frenzy)

In-universe information
- Species: Chinese dragon
- Gender: Male

Mushu is a tiny, red Chinese dragon and Mulan's companion. He is voiced by Eddie Murphy in Mulan and Mark Moseley in subsequent appearances.

At first, Mulan's companions were to be two reptilian creatures; the idea of the creatures being dragons had not been established. Feeling that two sidekicks would overcrowd the story, the animators decided on a green two-headed dragon, which evolved into Mushu's final design.

Around the time when the music of the film was to be created, the songwriters had written a song for Mushu, in which he assured Mulan that he would be there to help her. After Eddie Murphy agreed to voice the character, Mushu and his dynamic changed. Although the animators canceled the scene, the song was a favorite among the filmmakers.

Mushu was once a guardian spirit of Mulan's family, but was demoted to the position of an incense burner and gong-ringer for the deceased Fa ancestors after failing to protect the soldier Fa Deng, resulting in his death by decapitation. In contrast to Mulan, Mushu is more zany, impulsive, and enthusiastic.

He strives to be one of the family guardians again, but is content to help Mulan, even if he is the one who starts trouble. Though selfish at times, his heroism proves that he has a good heart. Mushu is sensitive about his size, claiming to Mulan that his small stature was simply for her convenience rather than his default state. He also hates being mistaken for a lizard, insisting that he doesn't do "that tongue thing".

He has the body of a snake, the horns of an elk, the claws of an eagle, and the face of a camel, resembling a legendary dragon found in Chinese art around the time. He has high durability and can breathe fire as well as understand other animals, such as Cri-kee and Mulan's horse Khan. Initially, he is unsuccessful at using this ability, but masters it in time to stop Shan Yu's falcon, Hayabusa, from alerting the Huns to Li Shang's presence.

When Mulan runs away from home, the ancestors, knowing that her being exposed will lead to the disgrace of the Fa family, send the Great Stone Dragon to retrieve her and Mushu to awaken it. After he accidentally destroys the dragon statue, he pretends to be the Great Stone Dragon and sets out to make Mulan a war hero to escape punishment. Along with Cri-Kee, he helps Mulan defeat Shan Yu, resulting in him being returned to the position of a guardian.

In Mulan II, after learning that he will lose his job once Mulan and Shang marry, he tries to break them up, causing a rift between him and Cri-Kee and Khan, with Mulan losing trust in him after he is forced to tell the truth out of guilt. However, after Shang's apparent death, his guilt leads him to sacrifice his job to save Mulan after she agrees to an arranged marriage. Upon learning that Shang is alive and that the ruler will not approve of his marriage to Mulan, Mushu reforms by impersonating the Golden Dragon of Unity to force the ruler to let Mulan and Shang marry. Though Mulan and Li Shang forgive Mushu and he accepts the loss of his job, after Shang combines the family temples, he is able to keep his job.

In the Kingdom Hearts video game series, Mushu appears in Kingdom Hearts and Kingdom Hearts: Chain of Memories as a summon and in Kingdom Hearts II in the world Land of Dragons, reprising his role from Mulan. He also appears as a playable character in the video games Disney Magic Kingdoms and Disney Heroes: Battle Mode.

Mushu does not appear in the 2020 film, with some of his role in the narrative being taken by a phoenix.

Mushu also appears in the Drawn to Animation show at Disney California Adventure's Disney Animation building and Disney's Hollywood Studios's The Magic of Disney Animation. He is also a meetable character in Adventureland at the parks alongside Mulan.

It has been theorized that Mushu's name is derived from mushkhushshu, a dragon-like creature from Mesopotamian mythology. Another theory suggests that his name comes from the popular Chinese dish moo shu pork.

=== Cri-Kee ===
Cri-Kee (voiced by Frank Welker) is a lucky cricket who Grandmother Fa gives to Mulan while preparing to meet the matchmaker. He first appears when Grandmother Fa crosses a road while covering her eyes to demonstrate his ability. After his actions lead the matchmaker to reject Mulan, Mulan releases him, but he continues to follow her and befriends Mushu before joining him in protecting Mulan. After Mulan is expelled from the army, Cri-kee confesses that he is not a lucky cricket, but Mushu decides that he is lucky after he helps Mulan save the Emperor and China from Shan Yu. In Mulan II, he opposes Mushu's attempts to break up Mulan and Li Shang before reconciling.

Cri-Kee appears as an unlockable playable character in the video game Disney Magic Kingdoms.

=== Hayabusa ===
Hayabusa (voiced by Frank Welker) is Shan Yu's pet saker falcon, who acts as his master's eyes and ears from a distance. Mushu burns off his feathers to stop him from warning the Huns of Li Shang's presence.

In video games, Hayabusa appears in Kingdom Hearts II during the boss battle against Shan Yu. Hayabusa also appears as a non-player character in the video game Disney Magic Kingdoms, appearing in one of Shan Yu's animated activities.

In the 2020 film, Hayabusa is replaced by Xianniang (portrayed by Gong Li), a sorceress allied with Bori Khan who can transform into a hawk. She is the secondary antagonist of the film, challenging Mulan's decision to fight for a society that regards her as inferior because of her gender. Xianniang ultimately betrays Khan by revealing his plans to Mulan, allowing her to warn the army, and sacrifices herself to save Mulan from being shot.

=== Khan ===
Khan (voiced by Frank Welker) is Mulan's horse, who has a black coat and white markings. He has a close relationship with Mulan, but dislikes Mushu. In Mulan, Mulan visits him after disguising herself as a man; though he is frightened at first, Mulan calms him down and, after revealing her true identity, he agrees to help her by taking her to the training grounds. Mushu and Cri-Kee later request his help to convince Chi-Fu to let Shang join the Imperial Army, but he declines as he does not want to be involved; this forces them to use a panda instead. During the surprise ambush in the mountains, he rescues Mulan after she causes an avalanche that kills many of the Huns. In Mulan II, he opposes Mushu's attempts to sabotage Mulan and Li Shang's relationship.

Khan appears as an unlockable playable character in the video game Disney Magic Kingdoms.

Black Wind, a character based on Khan, appears in the 2020 live-action remake.

=== Little Brother ===
Little Brother (vocal effects provided by Chris Sanders in Mulan and Frank Welker in Mulan II) is Mulan's pet dog.

== Shan Yu ==
Shan Yu
- First appearance: Mulan (1998)
- Created by: Robert D. San Souci; Pres Romanillos; Tim Hodge
- Portrayed by: Jason Scott Lee (live-action film)
- Voiced by: Miguel Ferrer (Mulan); Corey Burton (Kingdom Hearts II); SungWon Cho (Disney Speedstorm)

In-universe information
- Alias: Bori Khan (live-action film)

Shan Yu is a Hun chieftain and general of the Huns, who is the main antagonist of Mulan. He is cruel and ruthless, seeking to conquer China to prove his "superiority" to the Emperor and killing without mercy. His name is possibly derived from Chanyu, a title used by Inner Asian nomad rulers prior to the establishment of the title of khagan.

Like the rest of his people, Shan Yu is trained in living off the earth, possessing heightened senses and a trained saker falcon named Hayabusa as his pet. He has pride in his army and possesses a sense of honor, as he refuses to avoid the Imperial troops and takes them head-on despite knowing that they are better trained and equipped than his men.

After Li Shang's recruits complete their training, Hayabusa acquires a doll from a village in the Tung Shao Pass and, after inspecting it, deduces that the Imperial Army is waiting for them. Ambushing General Li's army, Shan Yu wipes out the Emperor's best troops, including General Li, and burns the village to the ground. As they head for the Imperial City, the Hun army ambushes Li Shang's troops in the Tung Shao Pass before Shan Yu leads his army in a mounted charge to wipe out Li Shang's battalion. However, Mulan takes control of Li Shang's cannon and causes an avalanche that kills most of his army, though he and Hayabusa, along with a handful of his most elite warriors, survive.

When the Emperor is presented with Shan Yu's sword, Hayabusa takes it while he and his men ambush and capture the Emperor and barricade themselves inside the palace. As Shan Yu threatens the Emperor at swordpoint to bow to him, Mulan, Li Shang, Yao, Chien-Pao, and Ling infiltrate the palace, freeing the Emperor and defeating Shan Yu's men and Hayabusa. Mulan finds Shan Yu about to strike Li Shang down and distracts him by revealing that she wiped out his army. While pursuing her throughout the palace and onto the roof, Shan Yu's attempt to kill Mulan backfires when she pins him down with his sword while Mushu kills him with fireworks.

In an earlier story draft for Mulan II written by Barry Cook, Shan Yu was originally intended to return with his army and haunt Northern China, prompting the Emperor to send Mulan and Shang there to deal with the Huns. The finale would have involved Shan Yu's ghost army fighting against Mulan and her allies, including the Fa family ancestors.

In video games, Shan Yu appears in Kingdom Hearts II as the main antagonist and final boss in the first visit to the world Land of Dragons. Shan Yu also appears as a playable character in the video games Disney Magic Kingdoms and Disney Heroes: Battle Mode.

In the 2020 film, Shan Yu is portrayed by Jason Scott Lee and is renamed Bori Khan. This version is a skilled warrior of Rouran descent who allies with Xianniang and seeks to avenge his father's death by killing the Emperor. After Xianniang sacrifices herself to save Mulan, she kills Khan in a final duel.

== Members of the Empire ==
=== Emperor of China ===
The Emperor of China is the wise and benevolent leader of China, who wears yellow, as was tradition for emperors. In Mulan, he is captured by Shan Yu and his warriors in an ambush, but Mulan and the group save him after infiltrating the palace. After Shan Yu is defeated, the emperor, though angry that Mulan impersonated a soldier, thanks her for saving China and offers her a position on his council, which she declines to be with her family. In gratitude, he gives her his crest and Shan Yu's sword, with the crest representing what she did for him and the sword representing what she did for China. In Mulan II, he instructs Mulan and Shang to take his daughters to the Mongol ruler Qui-Gong so they can be married to his sons and seal an alliance.

He was voiced by Pat Morita in the first two films and the video game Kingdom Hearts II. In the 2020 live-action remake, he is portrayed by Jet Li.

=== Chi-Fu ===
Chi-Fu (voiced by James Hong) is a member of the Emperor's council and advisor to Li Shang, who refuses to allow the recruits to join the battle against the Huns and serves as a minor antagonist of the film. Though loyal to his job and the Emperor, he is misogynistic, particularly towards Mulan, as he orders Li Shang to execute her once her secret is revealed, despite her saving everyone, and tells him that Mulan would never be worth anything because she is a woman. At the end of the film, as the Emperor praises Mulan for defeating Shan Yu and saving China, he tells Chi-Fu to arrange her for membership in his council. Still believing that Mulan is not worth anything, Chi-Fu attempts to dissuade him from doing so by claiming that there are no more available seats in the council, but this backfires when he tells Mulan she can have Chi-Fu's job, causing him to faint.

In the 2020 film, he is replaced by The Chancellor (portrayed by Nelson Lee). In contrast to Chi-Fu, the Chancellor has a smaller role in the film and does not interact with Mulan. He is eventually replaced by the witch Xianniang, who tricks the Emperor into dismissing his guards and walking into a trap by claiming that Bori Khan will leave if the Emperor defeats him in single combat.

=== Daughters of the Emperor of China ===
The Emperor of China's daughters, Ting-Ting, Mei, and Su, are princesses who appear in Mulan II.

==== Ting-Ting ====
Ting-Ting (voiced by Sandra Oh, singing voice provided by Judy Kuhn) is the eldest daughter of the Emperor of China and Crown Princess of China, who is carefree and childish despite trying to be mature. When Mushu causes the carriage to slide down, Ling saves her. After she hears his jokes, she thinks they are funny, but tries not to laugh, as she has an embarrassing snorting laugh. However, Ling finds it to be cute. Her signature color is lavender.

==== Mei ====
Mei (voiced by Lucy Liu, singing voice provided by Beth Blankenship) is the middle daughter of the Emperor of China, who is brave and kind. She gets along with Yao because she thinks he is good-looking and gentle at heart before Mulan helps her realize that her duty is to her heart. After Yao wins a wrestling fight, he gives her a stuffed panda that he won. She is kidnapped by the enemies of China, but is saved. Her signature color is pink.

==== Su ====
Su (voiced by Lauren Tom, singing voice provided by Mandy Gonzalez) is the youngest daughter of the Emperor of China, who bonds with Chien-Po over their shared love of food. Her signature color is orange.

== Others ==
=== Matchmaker ===
The Matchmaker (voiced by Miriam Margolyes in Mulan, April Winchell in Mulan II) is a matchmaker who considers Mulan to be a disgrace to her family after various incidents occur during her training.

She appears in the 2020 film, portrayed by Cheng Pei-pei.

=== Sha-Ron ===
Sha-Ron (voiced by Jillian Henry) is a young girl who appears in Mulan II and trains with Mulan.

=== Lord Qin and Prince Jeeki ===
Lord Qin (voiced by Keone Young) is the priest of Qigong, who appears in Mulan II. Though he allows Mulan to marry his son, Prince Jeeki (voiced by Rob Paulsen), their wedding is interrupted and he refuses to let Li Shang marry Mulan until the Golden Dragon of Unity grants them permission to. He notably had his hands stuck in Chinese finger trap.
