= Written in Stone =

Song
- Genre: Showtune
- Songwriter: Stephen Schwartz

"Written in Stone" is a song that was written for Disney's 1998 animated film Mulan, but was cut from the film when its composer Stephen Schwartz left the project. Lea Salonga auditioned for Mulan with "Written in Stone" and recorded a demo during production.

"Written in Stone" has "surfaced over the years" in later reworkings of the original film. Mulan's deleted torch song, which "accompan[ied] her transformation into a soldier", was salvaged by the one-act version of the play licensed to grade schools, Mulan Jr in multiple reprises . Meanwhile, Salonga has performed the original demo version live at least once.

Collider explains: " In addition to some amateur recordings made publicly accessible online, the song was translated into one of the tentpole numbers for the licensed children’s staged musical Mulan, Jr. The song incorporates the pentatonic (five notes per octave) scale, which are characteristic of traditional Chinese music."

== Development ==
=== Mulan (1998) ===
Stephen Schwartz was originally signed to the Mulan project as a lyricist and composer. He completed two songs: "China Doll" and "Written in Stone" Collider explains: "On the research trip to China that Schwartz attended with Mulan’s creative team, he took in the sounds of the country. In village shops, Schwartz collected tape recordings of traditional Chinese music. Standing in a market, he held up some little metal Chinese bells, ringing them to test their appeal. Convinced they could be used in a recording session, he purchased them.”

Partway into the project, DreamWorks also hired Schwartz to compose music for The Prince of Egypt. Disney gave Schwartz an ultimatum to work exclusively on Mulan; he refused and left the project. As a result, Disney removed both "China Doll" and "Written in Stone" from the film. Scwartz was replaced by Matthew Wilder and David Zippel. "Written in Stone" was essentially replaced by "Reflection", While Written In Stone "focused more on the way Mulan’s path in life was already laid out for her", Reflection would take on a more introspective tone. Broadwayworld asserted, Had Schwartz not been fired off that film because of his desire to score The Prince of Egypt the songs I think would have been different in tone".

Lea Salonga, who played the singing voice of Mulan, auditioned for the film with “Written in Stone”. She also recorded a demo of the song. "Written in Stone" plays when Mulan "gets into soldier's clothing and rides her horse off to join the army". Salonga performed the piece at Moore Theatre for a one night only concert in 2012.

=== Mulan Jr ===
The stage musical Mulan Jr. reinstated "Written in Stone" As the opening number it "confirms the strict social environment that exists in China" and that "traditions have dictated Chinese behavior for centuries". This sets up the central conflict of the musical whereby Mulan aims to reject her 'Written In Stone" traditions and write her own destiny with the approval of her ancestors. A significant theme of the song is honor of one's family, ancestors, and country, which is reinforced throughout "Written in Stone", Pt. 1, Pt. 2, Pt. 3 and its three reprises.

=== Later history ===
Schwartz described 'Written In Stone" as "one of my favorite songs I have ever written for an animated feature", and noted that while he was disappointed to leave the project, he was "very happy with the songs [he] had written for the film thus far". Arguably the first public performance of the song was by Lea Salonga on May 4, 2012, at Town Hall located in Times Square, NYC.

It was performed by Salonga in her 2022 Dream Again Tour, one of the "very few" times she had performed it in public. In the concert, Salonga begins by talking about the two Disney princesses she has voiced including Fa Mulan, and while the audience expects her to sing "Reflection," she actually sings the unused demo "Written in Stone" and talks about recording Schwartz's song in Manila via a cassette tape.

Unlike other unused Disney songs like Proud of Your Boy and Human Again whose demos were subsequently released, or Someday and Shooting Star which were adapted into pop versions played during the credits, both leading to interest over the years, "Written in Stone" never had this chance to build an underground cult following. It has never been referred to in any of Mulan's special edition re-releases.

In recent years it has become common for deleted songs being salvaged in later stage musical projects. However, Mulan is the only Disney Renaissance film alongside Pocahontas yet to be adapted into a stage musical unlike The Little Mermaid (2007), Beauty and the Beast (1994), Aladdin (2011), The Lion King (1997), The Hunchback of Notre Dame (1999), Hercules (2019), and Tarzan (2006), many of which have led to a renaissance of deleted songs from their respective films.

The negative history surrounding the change of composer, which would only be highlighted by publicizing this song, may contribute to Disney's reluctance to revive it. However, with the film's 25th anniversary in 2023 and work on a sequel to the live action film, there is a possibility of a panel on these songs, similar to the first public airing of Shooting Star's demo and storyboards at the 2017 D23.

== Critical reception ==
'Written In Stone" has been described as "absolutely stunning" and "amazing". Disney14 felt it was a "bizarre twist of irony" that the song is currently available in a stage version which companies can hire to produce. Collider wrote, "The pentatonic scale is one example of the authenticity that Schwartz brought to every Disney project to which he contributed. Schwartz’s work was influenced deeply by the ethnic settings and cultural underpinnings of each animated film."

Broadwayworld deemed it the standout of the Dream Again Tour, commenting, "I love the fact that Salonga included this song as the more obscure stuff always interests me." Mancunian wrote, "It was disappointing not to hear ‘Reflection’ but exciting to hear her sing the original ‘Reflection’ (so to speak)."
