= Honor to Us All =

Song by Beth Fowler, Marni Nixon and Lea Salonga

from the album Mulan: An Original Walt Disney Records Soundtrack
- Released: June 2, 1998
- Recorded: 1996
- Length: 3:03
- Label: Walt Disney
- Composer: Matthew Wilder
- Lyricist: David Zippel
- Producer: Matthew Wilder

"Honor to Us All" is a song written by composer Matthew Wilder and lyricist David Zippel for Walt Disney Pictures' animated film Mulan (1998). Recorded by singers Beth Fowler, Marni Nixon and Lea Salonga, the latter two of whom provide the singing voices of Grandmother Fa and Fa Mulan, respectively, the song is a character number performed by several older Chinese women and female members of Mulan's family as they prepare the main character to be evaluated by the Matchmaker in the scene towards the beginning of the film.

Songwriter Stephen Schwartz was originally enlisted to write the songs for Mulan, and had written a song called "China Doll" intended for the scene in which Mulan prepares to meet the Matchmaker. After the songwriter resigned from Mulan in favor of writing songs for rival studio DreamWorks' The Prince of Egypt (1998), Schwartz was ultimately replaced with Wilder and Zippel, who wrote "Honor to Us All" with which to replace "China Doll". Nixon's casting as Grandmother Fa's singing voice ultimately influenced Disney to recast the voice actress who had originally been hired to supply Grandmother Fa's speaking voice with actress June Foray due to closer similarities between Nixon's and Foray's voices.

Intended to be ironic, "Honor to Us All" features lyrics that instruct Mulan on how to become an ideal bride by emphasizing her physical appearance, remaining obedient to her prospective husband and eventually bearing children. Parodying traditional gender roles and cultural expectations of women, "Honor to Us All" has been identified as an East Asian-influenced song that heavily incorporates Asian instrumentation, more-so than any other musical number in the film. The song's use of pentatonic scales and Chinese flutes also help establish the film's setting, as does referencing the Chinese tradition of praying to one's ancestors. "Honor to Us All" has received mixed reviews from film and music critics, who were divided over both the song's quality and intended message. Commercially, although the song was not released as a single and did not chart, it was certified Gold by the Recording Industry Association of America (RIAA) for equivalent sales of 500,000 units in the United States.

== Background and recording ==
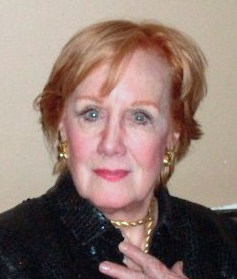
Marni Nixon recorded Grandmother Fa's vocals in "Honor to Us All".

Songwriter Stephen Schwartz had originally been slated to write both the music and lyrics for Mulan. He ultimately left the project to write songs for rival studio DreamWorks' animated film The Prince of Egypt (1998) after Disney executives forced him to choose between the two. Schwartz had completed only two songs for Mulan before his resignation, one of which was entitled "China Doll" which, according to Schwartz, "more or less corresponds to the scene in the film in which Mulan goes to the Matchmaker". Schwartz was eventually replaced by composer Matthew Wilder and lyricist David Zippel, who wrote "Honor to Us All" to replace "China Doll". Disney cast American singer and actress Marni Nixon, one of Hollywood's best known ghost singers, as the singing voice of Grandmother Fa, Mulan's paternal grandmother. Nixon received the sheet music for "Honor to Us All" to review prior to auditioning for the role. The filmmakers then showed Nixon a drawing of the character, by whose comedic appearance the singer was immediately "enchanted", telling herself "you've just got to give her a voice ... or, in this case, an unvoice." Nixon decided to make the character sound as though she was merely attempting to sing, rather than actually singing, keeping in mind that the elderly character is toothless. Nixon made no effort to sound like the actress who had been cast as Grandmother Fa's speaking voice, at the time, and almost reconsidered auditioning for the role upon realizing how different she sounded from Grandmother Fa's speaking voice actress.

Nixon's approach impressed the studio, and her recording, which took the singer only thirty-two minutes to complete, was ultimately kept. In the score of Mulan, Nixon performs only one verse in the song. Her musical contribution to "Honor to Us All" marked the singer's return to film roles following a lengthy hiatus. Mulan was also Nixon's first Disney film in 10 years; she had previously performed in the musical film Mary Poppins (1964). Nixon was eventually joined by Broadway performers Beth Fowler and Lea Salonga, although the three singers never recorded together. The studio enjoyed Nixon's performance so much that they ultimately decided to recast the actress who had been providing Grandmother Fa's speaking voice at the time with someone who sounded more like Nixon, hiring June Foray to provide the speaking voice for the role. Disney had been considered hiring actresses Lauren Bacall and June Havoc to record "Honor to Us All" prior to hearing Nixon. The songwriters first based "Honor to Us All" on a rough cut they had seen of the scene; the animators eventually synced the animated characters with the singers' voices.

Author Jennifer Fleeger wrote in her book Mismatched Women: The Siren's Song Through the Machine (2014) that the studio's decision to cast Nixon, an American who had previously done similar work as the singing voices of a Puerto Rican and Englishwoman in the musical films West Side Story (1961) and My Fair Lady (1964), respectively, as an elderly Chinese woman "speaks volumes about the desired singing voices of these supposedly diverse new characters." "Honor to Us All" was one of Nixon's final film performances before her death in 2016.

== Context ==
=== Use in Mulan ===
The film's use of "Honor to Us All" has been described as "expository" by Billboard's Andrew Unterberger. Within the context of Mulan, the song both introduces audiences to the title character while demonstrating some Chinese traditions, revealing that Mulan must initially rely on marriage to "settle her fate" at the beginning of the film. A character piece, "Honor to Us All" is performed by several older Chinese women, including Mulan's mother and grandmother Fa Li and Grandmother Fa, respectively, to Mulan as they prepare to the character to present her to the Matchmaker, hoping that she will be paired with a suitable husband and ultimately uphold their family's heritage. Before Mulan is introduced, the character can be heard reciting the "Final Admonition": "Quiet and demure. Graceful. Polite. Delicate. Refined. Poised. Punctual", values that are later visualized during "Honor to Us All". The musical number is preceded by a scene in which Mulan's father, Fa Zhou, asks his ancestors to help his daughter impress the Matchmaker, and decides that more prayer is required upon realizing that Mulan is already late for her appointment. Meanwhile, Fa Li is growing impatient waiting for her daughter to arrive at the village bathhouse, regretting not having prayed to her ancestors herself earlier that morning, to which Grandmother Fa responds "How lucky can they be? They're dead." Preparations begin once Mulan arrives on horseback.

Throughout the musical sequence, Mulan is taken to various shops and stores in the village, in which several women take turns painstakingly bathing, dressing and applying makeup to the character, one of whom compares her to a "sow's ear". Mulan tries her best to remain calm and demure throughout the entire process while learning about the requirements for being a girl who honors her family, as her mother and grandmother give her a makeover. The women advise Mulan that she will successfully find a husband by focusing on her physical appearance and striving to be an obedient housewife, instructing her that primping is a key ingredient in their "recipe for instant bride" and teaching her that marrying well is the only way for a girl to honor her family. She is told that maintaining her manners and physical appearance will assist her with finding a husband and ultimately bringing honor to her family. The song also reinforces the idea that the best way for Mulan to impress her future in-laws is by serving them tea and eventually giving birth to a son, teaching Mulan that men want a wife who is calm while boasting an attractive hairstyle and waistline. At times Mulan does resist her transformation, appearing to look uncomfortable in her own body. Salon's Jenn Shreve described Mulan as "clumsy in her woman's body, caught in that awkward limbo where the body belongs to an adult but the child inside hasn't quite caught up." In an effort to make her granddaughter even more appealing, Grandmother Fa bestows traditional Chinese gifts upon her. The sequence also features a prayer from Mulan to her ancestors, during which she asks that they help her not disappoint them or herself, reminding herself that failure to conform to society's expectations of her as a young woman will ultimately result in "uproot[ing] her family tree."

Towards the end of the scene after her makeover has finally been completed, Mulan stumbles through the marketplace to join a line of several young women, nearly identical to each other, who are also waiting to be evaluated by the Matchmaker; Mulan struggles to accept the idea that she is expected look and behave exactly like them. In the song, the girls demonstrate their understanding of the consequences should they fail to impress the Matchmaker by equating the character to an undertaker, meaning they believe disappointing her is "more powerful than death itself". A "playful rendition" of "Honor to Us All" can be heard during composer Jerry Goldsmith's "Suite from Mulan" score, which was released as a track on the film's soundtrack.

=== Interpretations ===
Similar to Disney's Aladdin (1992) and Pocahontas (1995) before it, Mulan begins with an opening song that establishes the film's location, setting and cultural characteristics, in this case "Honor to Us All". According to RogerEbert.com's Soren Hough, the song "establish[es] a gendered social hierarchy for its title character to rebel against." "Honor to Us All" attempts to deconstruct the idea that women are only good for looking attractive and getting married. According to Diversity in Disney Films: Critical Essays on Race, Ethnicity, Gender, Sexuality and Disability (2013) author Johnson Cheu, the power of the Matchmaker's decision "emphasizes the necessity of heterosexual approbation in order to secure a place in society." The musical number highlights Mulan's greatest dilemma; her own individuality constantly contradicts against society's expectations of young women. Consequence of Sound's Dominick Suzanne-Mayer cited "Honor to Us All" as an example of Mulan spending a significant portion of the film at the mercy of other characters, framing "her preparation rituals for courtship as a gauntlet of demands from ... her entire village" while "instructing her about how important it is for her to be complacent and attentive."

Tim Brayton, writing for the film review website Alternate Ending, believes that the song is intended to demonstrate "the idea that Imperial China was founded on unusually strong patriarchal principles". Author Phyllis Frus, writing in her book Beyond Adaptation: Essays on Radical Transformations of Original Works (2010), observed that the musical number offers examples of women and men occupying different roles in society: "a man fights for his country, whereas a woman gives birth to sons." The New York Times's Janet Maslin believes that scene's images of girls playing with dolls while boys play swords are used to show viewers "how wrongly and repressively [Mulan] is being treated" during "Honor to Us All". According to Sputnikmusic's Irving Tan, the song "opens and recounts the massive struggle that girls in the Han Dynasty had to face due to the repressive cultural norms of that age." Writing in his book Diversity in Disney Films: Critical Essays on Race, Ethnicity, Gender, Sexuality and Disability, author Johnson Cheu observed that every ideal characteristic of femininity described by the characters during the scene are "fabricated rather than natural", none of which are naturally associated with Mulan's gender but instead resemble "culturally constructed markers of femininity" that girls are forced to assume once they transition into womanhood. According to the book East-West Identities: Globalization, Localization, and Hybridization (2007), "Honor to Us All" helps establish Mulan as a tomboy. Hough Believes that "feminine-centric songs" that appear during the beginning of the film, such as "Honor to Us All", are eventually abandoned and replaced by more masculine numbers to indicate that Mulan "has become, as far as the audience is concerned, 'a man.'"

== Music and lyrics ==
According to the song's official sheet music, "Honor to Us All" was written in common time in the key of C major. It is performed at a "very quick" tempo of 168 beats per minute, lasting a total duration of three minutes and three seconds. The singers' vocals span nearly two octaves, from A_{3} to E_{5}. More similar in style to songs usually featured in Broadway musicals than animated films, "Honor to Us All" makes the most use of "ethnic instrumentation" out of all of the songs on the film's soundtrack, remaining distinctive in terms of its style, instrumentation, themes discussing cultural expectations of women, and vocal arrangements. The performance is influenced by traditional East Asian music. The Disney Song Encyclopedia author Thomas S. Hischak identified "Honor to Us All" as an "Oriental-flavored number" that features "a trace of Asian sound" courtesy of Wilder and Zippel's songwriting and Fowler and Nixon's performances, the latter of whom sings using a "lilting soprano". In Nixon's verse, Grandma Fa bestows traditional Chinese gifts upon Mulan that are intended to make her more appealing to a man, which is followed by a prayer performed solo by Salonga. Instrumentally, "Honor to Us All" is intended to represent the cultural characteristics of China by incorporating pentatonic scales and a Chinese flute.

According to the book Heroism and Gender in War Films (2014), the lyrics of "Honor to Us All" outline the "perfect woman". The phrase "Honor to us all" is constantly reiterated throughout the song. Identified by Hough as an "ultra-feminine satirical number", its "witty" lyrics are intended to be highly ironic, expressing that a daughter can only honor herself and her family by marrying, stating: Beginning with the line "This is what you give me to work with", the performers offer an extensive list of examples and qualities required to create an ideal bride, including the lyrics "Wait and see, when we're through, boys will gladly go to war for you" and "With good breeding and a tiny waist you'll bring honor to us all."

According to Hough, "A Girl Worth Fighting For" references "the superficial traits discussed in 'Honor to Us All'", such as a woman's physical appearance and cooking ability. The line "scarier than the undertaker, we are meeting our Matchmaker" appears towards the end of the song. Lyrically, "Honor to Us All" also makes heavy use of the literary device alliteration, as heard during its final verse "Destiny, guard our girls/And our future as it fast unfurls/Please look kindly on these cultured pearls/Each a perfect porcelain doll". Thought Catalog contributor Chelsea Fagan felt that the song's lyrics make it appropriate for single women whose loved ones are constantly pressuring them to pursue romantic relationships despite the fact that they would much rather remain single: "the kind of girl who doesn't need to be put into a tight-waisted outfit to go find herself a husband and pop out a bunch of sword-wielding sons. You've got other plans".

== Critical reception ==
"Honor to Us All" has received mixed reviews from music critics, who shared differing opinions about the song's intended message. Irving Tan of Sputnikmusic reviewed "Honor to Us All" as "peerless in creating an atmosphere of burdening expectations, and just by listening to it you know that Mulan is on the verge of single-handedly chopping down ten generations' worth of family tree honor." Soundtrack.Net's Dan Goldwasser described "Honor to Us All" as a "nice" song but felt that it was more appropriate for a Broadway musical than an animated film. Jamie Meun of Medium appreciated the song for "expos[ing] sexism instead of promoting it" and "expos[ing] the ridiculous expectations of women in China during the Han Dynasty." Packaging Girlhood: Rescuing Our Daughters from Marketers' Schemes Sharon Lamb was concerned that younger listeners would not understand the irony intended by the song's lyrics about women and take them seriously. The New York Times film critic Janet Maslin disagreed with Lamb, writing, "Even the tiniest viewers should see how wrongly and repressively she is being treated."

"Honor to Us All" has not particularly enjoyed a reputation as one of Disney's "classic" songs. On Billboard's ranking of "Every Song From the Disney Renaissance (1989–'99)", "Honor to Us All" was placed at number 41. Billboard music critic Andrew Unterberger described the song as "too expository to be all that catchy" while "the traditional Eastern musical influence feels well-intentioned but clumsy." However, he highlighted the song's second verse as "a nice touch". Bustle's Kadeen Griffiths considers "Honor to Us All" one of "14 Disney Songs You Only Know The Chorus Of" despite its catchiness, selecting "scarier than the undertaker, we are meeting our Matchmaker" as the only lyrics she remembers. Consequence of Sound ranked "Honor to Us All" one of Disney's worst songs, at number 214. In a more positive opinion, BuzzFeed ranked it the 63rd greatest animated Disney song, out of 102.

== Cover versions and parodies ==
In January 2017, a group of Chinese children garnered significant attention when a video of them reenacting the "Honor to Us All" musical sequence in their native language was released to the Internet and went viral. First shared by the Facebook page Disney Power, the video was eventually identified as a segment from a Chinese television show that features children reenacting scenes from popular films. The child actress who portrays Grandmother Fa in the reenactment has been widely commended for her performance, who Oh My Disney described as "in it to win it." Boing Boing's Caroline Siede wrote that the actress "perfectly captures Mulan's grandmother". Praising the children's accuracy upon reviewing a video that compares the live-action reenactment to the animated original side-by-side, Refinery29s Michael Hafford wrote that the children "remind how ridiculous it is that Hollywood more or less refuses to cast non-white actors in lead roles", specifically referring to the whitewashing controversy surrounding American actors Matt Damon and Scarlett Johansson's casting in the films The Great Wall (2016) and Ghost in the Shell (2017), respectively. Hafford continued, "if literal children can be great in a scene from Mulan, why can't movie studios give roles to, like, adults?"

== Certifications ==
Region	Certification	Certified units/sales
United States (RIAA)	Gold	500,000^{‡}
^{‡} Sales+streaming figures based on certification alone.
