= Mulan II =

2004 animated Disney film directed by Darrell Rooney and Lynne Southerland

- DVD cover
- Directed by: Darrell Rooney; Lynne Southerland
- Screenplay by: Michael Lucker; Chris Parker; Roger S. H. Schulman
- Story by: Jenny Wingfield
- Produced by: Jennifer Blohm
- Starring: Ming-Na Wen; BD Wong; Sandra Oh; Lauren Tom; Lucy Liu; Gedde Watanabe; Jerry Tondo; Harvey Fierstein; Mark Moseley
- Edited by: Pam Ziegenhagen
- Music by: Joel McNeely
- Production company: Disneytoon Studios (Note: Animation outsourced to Walt Disney Animation Japan, Wang Film Productions and SD Entertainment.)
- Distributed by: Walt Disney Home Entertainment (Note: Released through the Walt Disney Pictures banner.)
- Release dates: November 3, 2004 (Italy); December 28, 2004 (United States)
- Running time: 79 minutes
- Country: United States
- Language: English

Mulan II is a 2004 American animated direct-to-video musical road adventure film produced by Disneytoon Studios and distributed by Walt Disney Home Entertainment under the Walt Disney Pictures banner. The film was directed by Darrell Rooney and Lynne Southerland (in her directorial debut) and produced by Jennifer Blohm, from a screenplay written by Michael Lucker, Chris Parker, and Roger S. H. Schulman, which was based on a story by Jenny Wingfield.

It is the sequel to Walt Disney Feature Animation's 1998 animated feature film Mulan, featuring original songs that were written by composer Jeanine Tesori and lyricist Alexa Junge and a musical score composed and conducted by Joel McNeely. Much of the voice cast from the first film returned, excluding Eddie Murphy (Mushu), Miriam Margolyes (The Matchmaker), James Hong (Chi-Fu), Chris Sanders (Little Brother), and Matthew Wilder (Ling's singing voice). Murphy, Margolyes, and Sanders were replaced by Mark Moseley, April Winchell, and Frank Welker, respectively, while Gedde Watanabe does his own singing for the sequel.

Mulan II features Mulan and her new fiancé, General Li Shang, on a special mission: escorting the Emperor's three daughters across the country to meet their soon-to-be fiancés. Meanwhile, Mushu attempts to break up their relationship to keep his pedestal. The film deals with arranged marriages, loyalty, relationships, making choices, trust, and finding true love.

The film was released as a direct-to-video title in the United States on December 28, 2004, to negative reviews from critics.

== Plot ==
One month after defeating the Huns, (Note: As depicted in Mulan (1998)) Mushu enjoys his restored status as a guardian spirit, to the dismay of the Fa family ancestors, who wish he would get fired from his job. General Shang asks Mulan for her hand in marriage, and she happily accepts. Mushu is initially thrilled about the engagement, until the ancestors inform him that if Mulan marries Shang, his family ancestors would become her guardians and Mushu will lose his job, much to his disappointment. The Emperor calls upon Mulan and Shang and informs them of the threat the Mongols pose to China. To oppose them, the Emperor intends to strengthen China by forging an alliance with the kingdom of Qui Gong, arranging for his three daughters, Princesses Ting-Ting, Mei, and Su, to be married to Qui Gong's princes, and assigns Mulan and Shang to protect them on their journey. Although uneasy at the idea of arranged marriage, Mulan agrees to the mission.

Mulan and Shang, along with Yao, Ling and Chien-Po, set out with the princesses to Qui Gong, leading them to a road trip. In order to protect his position as guardian, and believing that Mulan and Shang are incompatible due to their contrasting personalities, Mushu tags along on the trip to sabotage their relationship, while Cri-Kee attempts to stop him. While desperately trying various ways to sabotage Mulan and Shang's relationship, Mushu accidentally destroys the princess's carriage. Now forced to travel on foot, Mulan and Shang briefly argue over what direction they should go, as well as their duties. Seeing this, Mushu manipulates Shang into believing that Mulan is fed up with him, escalating tensions between them.

Meanwhile, Mei, Ting Ting and Su fall in love with Yao, Ling and Chien-Po respectively, and the princesses decide to follow Mulan's advice of having a duty to their hearts. That night, Yao, Ling and Chien-Po take the princesses out to a nearby village, and they mutually declare their love. Mulan pursues them, becoming happy that the princesses have followed their hearts. Mushu wakes up Shang, who pursues the group and reprimands them for forgetting about their duties. Mulan and Shang erupt into a heated argument, and decide that they are too different for each other and break up.

The group begins travelling across bandit country, and Mushu realizes that Mulan's break-up with Shang has only made her miserable. Overwhelmed with guilt, Mushu confesses to his actions, losing Mulan's trust yet motivating her to reconcile with Shang. The group is attacked by bandits that attempt to kidnap the princesses. Although the princesses are saved, Mulan and Shang are left dangling on a broken bridge, but Shang allows himself to fall into the ravine so that Mulan can lift herself up. Heartbroken, Mulan declares that the princesses will not be forced into a loveless marriage and continues on to Qui Gong alone. Mulan presents herself to Qui Gong's ruler, Lord Qin, and lies that the princesses have been killed, offering herself in their place; Lord Qin agrees, and arranges a wedding between Mulan and his eldest son, Prince Jeeki.

Shang survives and reunites with Yao, Ling, Chien-Po and the princesses, and heads to Qui Gong. Shang interrupts the wedding and admits that Mulan was right about following her heart. To save Mulan and Shang from Lord Qin's forces, Mushu impersonates the Great Golden Dragon of Unity, forcing Lord Qin to ally himself with the Emperor, while Mulan and Shang reconcile and free the princesses from their vows. Sometime later, Mulan and Shang finally marry in Mulan's village, and Mushu accepts the loss of his position. However, Shang combines the family temples, enabling Mushu to continue being a guardian spirit. While celebrating, Mushu accidentally reveals himself to Shang and Mulan, but Shang is not surprised as he was already aware of Mushu's existence, as Mulan had already told Shang about him. Afterwards, Shang and Mulan embrace while the thrilled Mushu is happy to have his role back.

== Voice cast ==
- Ming-Na Wen as Fa Mulan
  - Lea Salonga as Fa Mulan (singing voice)
- BD Wong as General Li Shang
- Lucy Liu as Princess Mei
  - Beth Blankenship as Princess Mei (singing voice)
- Sandra Oh as Princess Ting-Ting
  - Judy Kuhn as Princess Ting-Ting (singing voice)
- Lauren Tom as Princess Su
  - Mandy Gonzalez as Princess Su (singing voice)
- Gedde Watanabe as Ling
- Harvey Fierstein as Yao
- Jerry Tondo as Chien-Po
- Mark Moseley as Mushu
- Pat Morita as The Emperor of China
- George Takei as First Ancestor Fa
- June Foray as Grandmother Fa
- Freda Foh Shen as Fa Li
- Frank Welker as Cri-Kee/Little Brother
- Soon-Tek Oh as Fa Zhou
- April Winchell as The Matchmaker
- Jillian Henry as Sha-Ron
- Keone Young as Lord Qin
- Michelle Kwan as Shopkeeper
- Rob Paulsen as Prince Jeeki

== Marketing ==
The trailer for the film was first released on January 27, 2004, with the 2-Disc Special Edition release of Alice in Wonderland. The trailer was also attached to other VHS and DVDs released by Walt Disney Home Entertainment in 2004. A behind-the-scenes sneak preview was also released on October 26, 2004, with the Special Edition release of its predecessor.

== Soundtrack ==
Mulan II

Soundtrack album by Various artists
- Released: January 25, 2005
- Recorded: 2004
- Length: 31:41
- Label: Walt Disney Records
- Producers: Brian Rawling; Graham Stack; Brett Swain

Professional ratings
Review scores
Source	Rating
Allmusic	3/5 stars

The soundtrack contains songs from the film performed by various artists, as well as portions of the film score composed by Joel McNeely. It was released on January 25, 2005, by Walt Disney Records.

All tracks are written by Jeanine Tesori and Scott Erickson.

No.	Title	Performer(s)	Length
1.	"Lesson Number One"	Lea Salonga & Chorus
2.	"Main Title"
3.	"Like Other Girls"	Judy Kuhn, Beth Blankenship & Mandy Gonzalez
4.	"A Girl Worth Fighting For (Redux)"	Gedde Watanabe, Harvey Fierstein & Jerry Tondo
5.	"Here Beside Me"	Hayley Westenra
6.	"(I Wanna Be) Like Other Girls"	Atomic Kitten
7.	"The Journey Begins"
8.	"In Love and in Trouble"
9.	"The Attack"
10.	"Shang Lives!"
11.	"Here Beside Me"

== Reception ==
Review aggregator Rotten Tomatoes gave the film a rating of 0% based on reviews from 5 critics and an average score of 3.9/10. According to Scott Gwin of CinemaBlend, "Mulan II is a direct-to-DVD disgrace that takes everything excellent about its predecessor film, rips it to shreds, and uses it for rat cage lining." TV Guide reviewer Robert Pardi gave the film a 2 out of 5 star rating, saying, "The original Mulan was heralded for adding a spunky heroine to the Disney canon of distressed princesses, but despite its excellent voice cast, this sequel merely apes the success of live-action martial arts films".

== Canceled sequel ==
In early 2002, it was reported that Disney was working on Mulan III. Raymond Singer and Eugenia Bostwick-Singer, writers of the first film, submitted two stories to Disney, in which they suggested a new character named Ana Ming. Like this film, the second sequel would have been released direct-to-video, but it was canceled before the release of Mulan II.

== See also ==
- Roles of mothers in Disney media
- List of animated feature films
