= Marni Nixon =

American singer and actress (1930–2016)

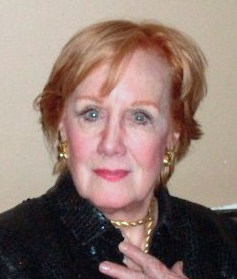
- Nixon at the Metropolitan Room, New York City (2009)
- Born: Margaret Nixon McEathron; February 22, 1930; Altadena, California, U.S.
- Died: July 24, 2016 (aged 86); New York City, U.S.
- Occupations: Singer, actress
- Years active: 1942–2009
- Spouses: Ernest Gold (m. 1950; div. 1969); Lajos Fenster (m. 1971; div. 1975); Albert Block (m. 1983; died 2015)
- Children: 3, including Andrew Gold

Margaret Nixon McEathron (February 22, 1930 – July 24, 2016), known professionally as Marni Nixon, was an American soprano and ghost singer for featured actresses in musical films. She was the singing voice of leading actresses on the soundtracks of several musicals, including Deborah Kerr in The King and I and An Affair to Remember, Natalie Wood in West Side Story, and Audrey Hepburn in My Fair Lady, although her roles were concealed from audiences when the films were released. Several of the songs she dubbed appeared on AFI's 100 Years...100 Songs list.

Besides her voice work in films, Nixon's career included roles of her own in film, television, opera and musicals on Broadway and elsewhere throughout the United States, performances in concerts with major symphony orchestras, and recordings.

== Early life ==
Born in Altadena, California, to Charles Nixon and Margaret Elsa (née Wittke) McEathron, Nixon was a child film actress who also played the violin and began singing at an early age in choruses, including performing solos with the Roger Wagner Chorale. She went on to study singing and opera with, among others, Vera Schwarz, Carl Ebert, Boris Goldovsky and Sarah Caldwell. In 1947, having adopted the stage name "Marni Nixon", she made her Hollywood Bowl solo debut in Carmina Burana with the Los Angeles Philharmonic under conductor Leopold Stokowski.

== Career ==
=== Early films and musicals ===
Nixon's career in film started in 1948 when she sang the voices of the angels heard by Ingrid Bergman in Joan of Arc (1948). The same year, she did her first dubbing work when she provided Margaret O'Brien's singing voice in 1948's Big City and then 1949's The Secret Garden. She sang for Jeanne Crain in Cheaper by the Dozen (1950) and dubbed Marilyn Monroe's high notes in "Diamonds Are a Girl's Best Friend" in Gentlemen Prefer Blondes (1953). Also in 1953, she sang for Ida Lupino in Jennifer. Nixon appeared on Broadway in 1954 in The Girl in Pink Tights.

In 1956, she worked closely with Deborah Kerr to supply the star's singing voice for the film version of Rodgers and Hammerstein's The King and I; Kerr broke with Hollywood convention by publicly crediting Nixon's singing. In 1957 Nixon again worked with Kerr to dub her voice in An Affair to Remember. That year, she also sang for Sophia Loren in Boy on a Dolphin. In 1960, she dubbed Janet Leigh's voice in Pepe and had an on-screen chorus role in Can-Can. In 1961's West Side Story, the studio kept her work on the film (as the singing voice of Natalie Wood's Maria) a secret from Wood, and Nixon also dubbed Rita Moreno's singing in the film's "Tonight" quintet. She asked the film's producers for, but did not receive, direct royalties from her work on the film, but Leonard Bernstein contractually gave her ¼ of one percent (0.25%) of his personal royalties from it. After a court case, she received royalties from sales of the soundtrack album and spoke out for the rights of ghost singers. In 1962, she also sang Wood's high notes in Gypsy. For My Fair Lady in 1964, she again worked with the female lead of the film, Audrey Hepburn, to perform the songs of Hepburn's character Eliza. Because of her uncredited dubbing work in these films, Time magazine called her "The Ghostess with the Mostest". Nevertheless, the public did not know Nixon's face; she appeared on To Tell the Truth the same year, where two members of the panel were fooled.

Nixon made guest appearances with Leonard Bernstein's Young People's Concerts, including in 1960, singing "Improvisation sur Mallarmé I" from Pli selon pli by Pierre Boulez, and on April 9, 1961, in a program entitled "Folk Music in the Concert Hall", singing three "Songs of the Auvergne" by Joseph Canteloube. Before My Fair Lady was released in theatres in 1964, Nixon played Eliza in a revival of the musical at New York City Center. Nixon's first onscreen appearance was as Sister Sophia in the 1965 film The Sound of Music. In the DVD commentary to the film, director Robert Wise comments that audiences were finally able to see the woman whose voice they knew so well. In 1967, she was the singing voice of Princess Serena in a live action and animated version of Jack and the Beanstalk on NBC. Especially in the 1960s, but also earlier and later, Nixon made concert appearances, specializing in contemporary music as a soloist with the New York Philharmonic, and gave recitals at Carnegie Hall, Alice Tully Hall and Town Hall in New York City.

=== Later work ===
Nixon taught at the California Institute of the Arts in Valencia from 1969 to 1971 and joined the faculty of the Music Academy of the West, Montecito, in 1980, where she taught for many years. In the late 1970s and early 1980s, she hosted a children's television show in Seattle on KOMO-TV channel 4 called Boomerang, winning four Emmy Awards as best actress, and made numerous other television appearances on variety shows and as a guest star in prime time series. Nixon's opera repertory included Zerbinetta in Ariadne auf Naxos, Susanna in The Marriage of Figaro, both Blonde and Konstanze in Die Entführung aus dem Serail, Violetta in La traviata, the title role in La Périchole and Philine in Mignon. Her opera credits included performances at Los Angeles Opera, Seattle Opera, San Francisco Opera and the Tanglewood Music Festival among others. In addition to giving recitals, she appeared as an oratorio and concert soloist with the New York Philharmonic under Leonard Bernstein, the Los Angeles Philharmonic, the Cleveland Orchestra, Toronto Symphony Orchestra, the London Symphony Orchestra and the Israel Philharmonic Orchestra among others. In 1983, she was a soloist with the Naumburg Orchestral Concerts, in the Naumburg Bandshell, Central Park, in the summer series.

Nixon also toured with Liberace and Victor Borge and later in her own cabaret shows. On stage, in 1984, she originated the role of Edna Off-Broadway in Taking My Turn, composed by Gary William Friedman, receiving a nomination for a Drama Desk Award. She also originated the role of Sadie McKibben in Opal (1992), and she had a 1997 film role as Aunt Alice in I Think I Do. Under her own name, beginning in the 1980s, Nixon recorded songs by Jerome Kern, George Gershwin and various classical composers. She was nominated for two Grammy Awards for Best Classical Performance, Vocal Soloist, one for her Schönberg album and one for her Copland album.

In the 1998 Disney film Mulan, Nixon was the singing voice of "Grandmother Fa". She then returned to the stage, touring the United States as Fraulein Schneider in Cabaret in 1997–1998. She eventually sang on more than 50 soundtracks. In 1999, she originated the role of Mrs. Wilson in the premiere of Ballymore, an opera by Richard Wargo at Skylight Opera Theatre in Milwaukee, Wisconsin, which was taped for PBS. In regional theatre and Off-Broadway, she played Nurse in Romeo and Juliet and appeared in productions of The King and I and The Sound of Music. She also continued to teach voice and judge vocal competitions.

In 2000, after nearly a half century away, she returned to Broadway as Aunt Kate in James Joyce's The Dead. In 2001, Nixon replaced Joan Roberts as Heidi Schiller in the Broadway revival of Stephen Sondheim's Follies. She played Eunice Miller in 70, Girls, 70 in a 2002 production in Los Angeles. In 2003, she was again on Broadway as a replacement in role of Guido's mother in the revival of Nine. Her autobiography, I Could Have Sung All Night, was published in 2006. She performed in the 2008 North American Tour of Cameron Mackintosh's UK revival of My Fair Lady in the role of Mrs. Higgins. She then appeared as Frau Direktor Kirschner in the 2009 Encores! production of the musical Music in the Air at New York City Center.

== Personal life and death ==
In 1950, Nixon married the first of her three husbands, Ernest Gold, who composed the musical score for the movie Exodus. They had three children, including singer and songwriter Andrew Gold. They divorced in 1969. She was married to Lajos "Fritz" Fenster from 1971 to 1975 and to woodwind player Albert Block from 1983 to his death in 2015.

Nixon survived breast cancer in 1985 and 2000 but died from the disease on July 24, 2016, in New York, aged 86.

== Honors ==
On October 27, 2008, Nixon was presented with the Singer Symposium's Distinguished Artist Award in New York City. She was also an honorary member of Sigma Alpha Iota International Women's Music Fraternity.

In 2011, Nixon was the recipient of the George Peabody Award for Outstanding Contributions to American Music.

== Filmography ==
=== Film ===
Year	Title	Role	Notes
1942	The Bashful Bachelor	Angela Abernathy	
1950	Cinderella	Soprano Soloist (vocals)	Song: "Cinderella" (uncredited)
1951	Alice in Wonderland	Singing Flowers (vocals)	Uncredited
1953	Gentlemen Prefer Blondes	Lorelei Lee (vocals)	Song: "Diamonds Are a Girl's Best Friend" [high notes] (uncredited)
1956	The King and I	Anna Leonowens (vocals)	4 songs (uncredited)
1956	Dance with Me, Henry	Shelley (vocals)	Song: "Libiamo ne' lieti calici"
1957	An Affair to Remember	Terry McKay (vocals)	3 songs (uncredited)
1961	West Side Story	Maria (vocals)	7 songs (uncredited)
1964	Mary Poppins	Geese (vocals)	Uncredited
1964	My Fair Lady	Eliza Doolittle (vocals)	10 songs (uncredited)
1965	The Sound of Music	Sister Sophia	Song: "Maria"
1997	I Think I Do	Aunt Alice	
1998	Mulan	Grandmother Fa (vocals)	Song: "Honor to Us All" (uncredited)

=== Television ===
Year	Title	Role	Notes
1967	Jack and the Beanstalk	Princess Serena (vocals)	TV movie; various songs
1969	The Mothers-in-Law	Herself	Episode: "The Not-So-Grand Opera"
1977–1981	Boomerang	Herself	KOMO-TV, Seattle
1984	Taking My Turn	Edna	Movie
2001	Law & Order: Special Victims Unit	Edna Dumas	Episode: "Redemption"
