= Jerry Tondo =

American actor

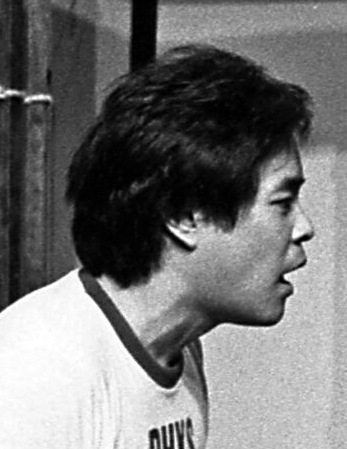
- Tondo in 1986
- Born: Jerry Shigekazu Tondo; October 10, 1950 (age 75); San Francisco, California, U.S.
- Occupation: Actor
- Years active: 1983–present

Jerry Shigekazu Tondo (born October 10, 1950) is an American actor. He is known for providing the voice of the character Chien-Po in the animated film Mulan. Other titles Tondo has contributed to include Gung Ho, The Secret Saturdays and Mulan II.

== Biography ==
Tondo discovered acting while attending high school in San Francisco, California. He was offered scholarships to play football, but decided to study sociology. He then enrolled in a theater course. He served on the board of directors while participating as a company member of the Asian American Theater Co. He moved to Los Angeles, California and started working with the East-West Players. Five years later he joined the Mark Taper Forum/Improvisation Theater Project. For six years he toured with the project. He was also a performing member of Cold Tofu Improv. He currently resides with his wife and two children in Manhattan Beach, California.

== Filmography ==
Film
Year	Title	Role	Notes
1984	Ghost Warrior	Sushi chef	
1986	Gung Ho	Kazuo	
1989	Scenes from the Class Struggle in Beverly Hills	June-bug	
1990	Circuitry Man	Fatch	
1994	It's Pat	Sushi chef	
1994	Drop Zone	DEA guard	
1995	Nick of Time	Chief Aide	
1998	Mulan	Chien-Po	Voice
1999	Godzilla 2000: Millennium		
2004	Mulan II	Chien-Po	Voice, direct-to-video

Television
Year	Title	Role	Notes
1983	Girls of the White Orchid	Policeman	Television film, alternative title Death Ride to Osaka
1985	Brothers	Sailor #1	Episode: "Gobba, Gobba"
1986	Trapper John, M.D.	Mills	Episode: "Strange Bedfellows"
1987	The Three Kings		Television film
1988	Beauty and the Beast	Eddie	Episode: "China Moon"
1988	The Tracey Ullman Show	Stage manager	Episode: "3.1"
1988	Miracle at Beekman's Place		Television film
1991	Mission of the Shark: The Saga of the U.S.S. Indianapolis	Aioki	Television film
2008-2009	The Secret Saturdays	Hibagon / Professor Talu Mizuki	Voice, 3 episodes

Video games
Year	Title	Role	Notes
1998	Disney's Animated Storybook: Mulan	Chien-Po	Voice
1998	Mulan Story Studio	Chien-Po	Voice
2005	The Matrix: Path of Neo	Japanese assassin	Voice
2005	Kingdom Hearts II	Chien-Po	English version, voice
2007	Kingdom Hearts II: Final Mix+	Chien-Po	English version, voice
