= David Zippel =

American musical theatre lyricist (born 1954)

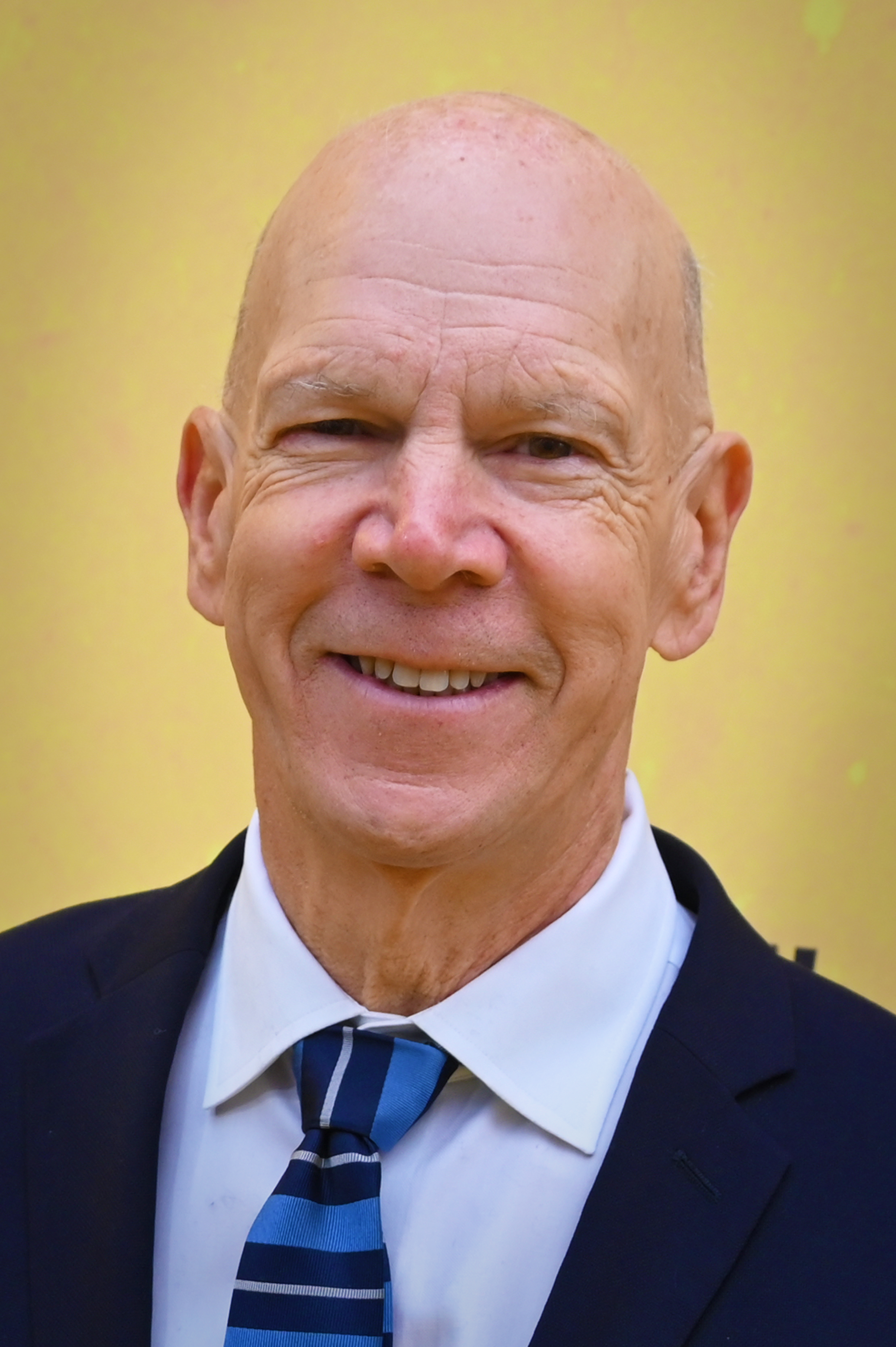
- Zippel in 2025
- Born: David Joel Zippel; May 17, 1954 (age 72); Easton, Pennsylvania, U.S.
- Education: University of Pennsylvania ((BA); Harvard University (JD)
- Occupation: Lyricist • director • producer

David Joel Zippel (born May 17, 1954) is an American musical theatre and film lyricist, composer, songwriter, director, and producer.

== Early life and education ==
Zippel was born on May 17, 1954, in Easton, Pennsylvania, in the Lehigh Valley region of eastern Pennsylvania. Falling in love with theater as a child, Zippel first articulated his life's ambition to become a lyricist and director in junior high school.

He attended the University of Pennsylvania in Philadelphia, where he contributed lyrics to an equity production of "a bizarre political musical" called Rotunda, which had a brief run in Washington, D.C. before he graduated with a B.A. in 1976. In 1979, Zippel obtained a J.D. degree from Harvard Law School. While at Harvard Law School, Zippel continued to pursue his artistic ambitions and wrote several pop songs with singer Pamala Stanley, which appeared on her 1979 debut album, This Is Hot, and collaborated on three songs with Wally Harper, Barbara Cook's musical director. Wally Harper's performance of these songs at Carnegie Hall in 1980 marked Zippel's New York City theatrical debut.

== Career ==
=== Theatre ===
==== As lyricist and writer ====
- City of Angels (1989), an original musical with book by Larry Gelbart and music by Cy Coleman. Tony Award for Best Musical, Best Score, Best Book, Best Actor (James Naughton) Best Featured Actress (Randy Graff), and Best Set Design (Robin Wagner); Drama Desk Award for Outstanding Lyrics; Olivier Awards for Best New Musical (1994), Best Musical Revival (2015); The Evening Standard Theatre Award for Best Musical (1993)
- The Goodbye Girl (1993), a musical based on Neil Simon's 1977 screenplay, with music by Marvin Hamlisch. Nominated for five Tony Awards including Best Musical; Drama Desk Award nomination for Outstanding Lyrics.
- The Woman in White (2004), an adaptation of the novel by Wilkie Collins, with music by Andrew Lloyd Webber, book by Charlotte Jones. The music and lyrics received a Tony Award nomination for Best Original Score. The show was nominated for five Laurence Olivier Awards, including Best Musical.
- Liza's at the Palace (2009), script co-written with Liza Minnelli, special lyrics with music by John Kander and Billy Stritch; Tony Award for Best Special Theatrical Event (2009)
- Cinderella (2020), a new adaptation of the classic story, with music by Andrew Lloyd Webber, based on the book by Emerald Fennell

==== As conceiver and director ====
- Princesses (2004), loosely inspired by A Little Princess by Frances Hodgson Burnett. Zippel conceived and directed; book by Bill and Cheri Steinkellner, music by Matthew Wilder. The musical was produced at the 5th Avenue Theatre, Seattle, Washington, in August 2005, after a "developmental" production at Goodspeed Musicals' Norma Terris Theatre in fall 2004.
- The Best Is Yet To Come: The Music of Cy Coleman, Indy Award for Best Direction (2010); Drama Desk Award for Outstanding Revue (2012)
- They're Playing His Songs: The Music of Marvin Hamlisch (2013)
- The Importance of Being Earnest (In New York) (2015)

==== As producer ====
- Spamilton: An American Parody (2016), Gerard Alessandrini's off-Broadway spoof of Lin-Manuel Miranda's Broadway musical Hamilton, Off-Broadway Alliance Award for Best Unique Theatrical Experience (2017); MAC Award for Show of the Year (2017)
- Hercules (2019), an adaptation of the Disney animated film of the same name, with music by Alan Menken.

=== Film and television ===
==== Films ====
- In 1994, Zippel contributed lyrics to Richard Rich's The Swan Princess, with music by Lex de Azevedo, and provided the singing voice of Jean-Bob the Frog.
- In 1997, he wrote the lyrics for Disney's Hercules, with music by Alan Menken, including the song "Go the Distance", which received an Academy Award nomination for Best Original Song.
- In 1998, he wrote lyrics for Disney's Mulan, with music by Matthew Wilder. The music and lyrics received an Academy Award nomination for Best Musical or Comedy Score and an Annie Award for Music in an Animated Feature Production.
- In 2008, he appeared in the film Finding Kraftland.
- Also in 2008, Pamela's First Musical, written with Coleman and Wendy Wasserstein, based on Wasserstein's children's book, received its world premiere in a concert at Town Hall in New York City on May 18, 2008.
- In 2011, Zippel wrote the lyrics to the song "Star Spangled Man", which is featured in the film Captain America: The First Avenger. Alan Menken composed the music for the song, which was an affectionate send-up of Irving Berlin songs from the 1940s.

==== Television ====
- In 1997, Zippel composed the theme song for Veronica's Closet, a sit-com starring Kirstie Alley.

== Filmography ==
=== Film ===
Year	Title	Role	Notes
1994	The Swan Princess	Jean-Bob (singing voice)	Voice
