= Walt Disney Animation Studios short films (1986–1999) =

This is a list of short films created by Walt Disney Animation Studios between the years 1986 and 1999.

== Theatrical shorts ==
=== 1980s ===
Series	Title	Director	Release Date	DVD Release	Notes
—N/a	Oilspot and Lipstick	Michael Cedeno	July 28, 1987	—N/a	Computer animation Screened at SIGGRAPH
Roger Rabbit	Tummy Trouble	Rob Minkoff	June 23, 1989	Honey, I Shrunk the Kids (VHS, LaserDisc); Who Framed Roger Rabbit (Vista Series)	In theaters with Honey, I Shrunk the Kids. First Roger Rabbit cartoon.

=== 1990s ===
Series	Title	Director	Release Date	DVD Release	Notes
Roger Rabbit	Roller Coaster Rabbit	Rob Minkoff	June 15, 1990	Who Framed Roger Rabbit (Vista series)	In theaters with Dick Tracy. Released under the Touchstone Pictures banner.
Mickey Mouse	The Prince and the Pauper	George Scribner	November 16, 1990	The Prince and the Pauper (VHS, LaserDisc) "Mickey Mouse in Living Color, Volume Two" "Timeless Tales, Volume One	In theaters with The Rescuers Down Under.
—N/a	Off His Rockers	Barry Cook	July 17, 1992	Honey, I Blew Up the Kid (LaserDisc)	In theaters with Honey, I Blew Up the Kid.
Roger Rabbit	Trail Mix-Up	Barry Cook	March 12, 1993	Who Framed Roger Rabbit (Vista series)	In theaters with A Far Off Place. Final Roger Rabbit cartoon.
Mickey Mouse	Runaway Brain	Chris Bailey	August 11, 1995	"Mickey Mouse in Living Color, Volume Two"	In theaters with A Kid in King Arthur's Court and re-released with George of the Jungle.

== Non-theatrical shorts ==
Non-theatrical shorts include direct-to-video shorts, which have been released as bonus content on VHS, DVD, Blu-ray, and HD Digital releases of Disney features, as well as Wartime & industrial shorts, educational shorts, and theme park attractions featuring well known characters. The list also includes TV specials, produced by Disney studio and screened by ABC, and shorts released on Disney+.

=== Educational shorts ===
Note: All Educational shorts were mostly produced by Walt Disney Educational productions and were distributed to schools unless otherwise is noted.

Series	Title	Director	Release Date	DVD Release	Notes
Educational	Recycle Rex	Howard E. Baker	February 5, 1993	Dinosaur (2-Disc Special Edition, easter egg)	Co-produced with Klasky-Csupo, Inc.

=== TV specials ===
Series	Title	Director	Release date	Release format	Notes
Goofy	Sport Goofy in Soccermania	Matthew O'Callaghan	May 27, 1987	NBC television special	Originally planned for theatrical release

=== Theme park shorts ===
Series	Title	Director	Release date	Release format	Notes
Educational	The Animated Atlas of the World		January 15, 1986	Theme park attraction	Shown at The Living Seas, made available to classrooms through Epcot Educational Media.
Educational	Suited for the Sea		January 15, 1986	Theme park attraction	Shown at The Living Seas, made available to classrooms through Epcot Educational Media.
Peter Pan	Back to Never Land	Jerry Rees	May 1, 1989	Theme park attraction	Was shown at the Magic of Disney Animation in Disney MGM Studios. The attraction permanently closed on September 30, 2003
—N/a	Cranium Command	Jerry Rees; Gary Trousdale; Kirk Wise	October 19, 1989	Theme park attraction	Animation production
The Lion King	Circle of Life: An Environmental Fable		January 21, 1995	Theme park attraction	Was shown at The Land in Epcot. The attraction permanently closed on February 3, 2018
