= The Magic of Disney Animation =

Interactive tour at Disney's Hollywood Studios

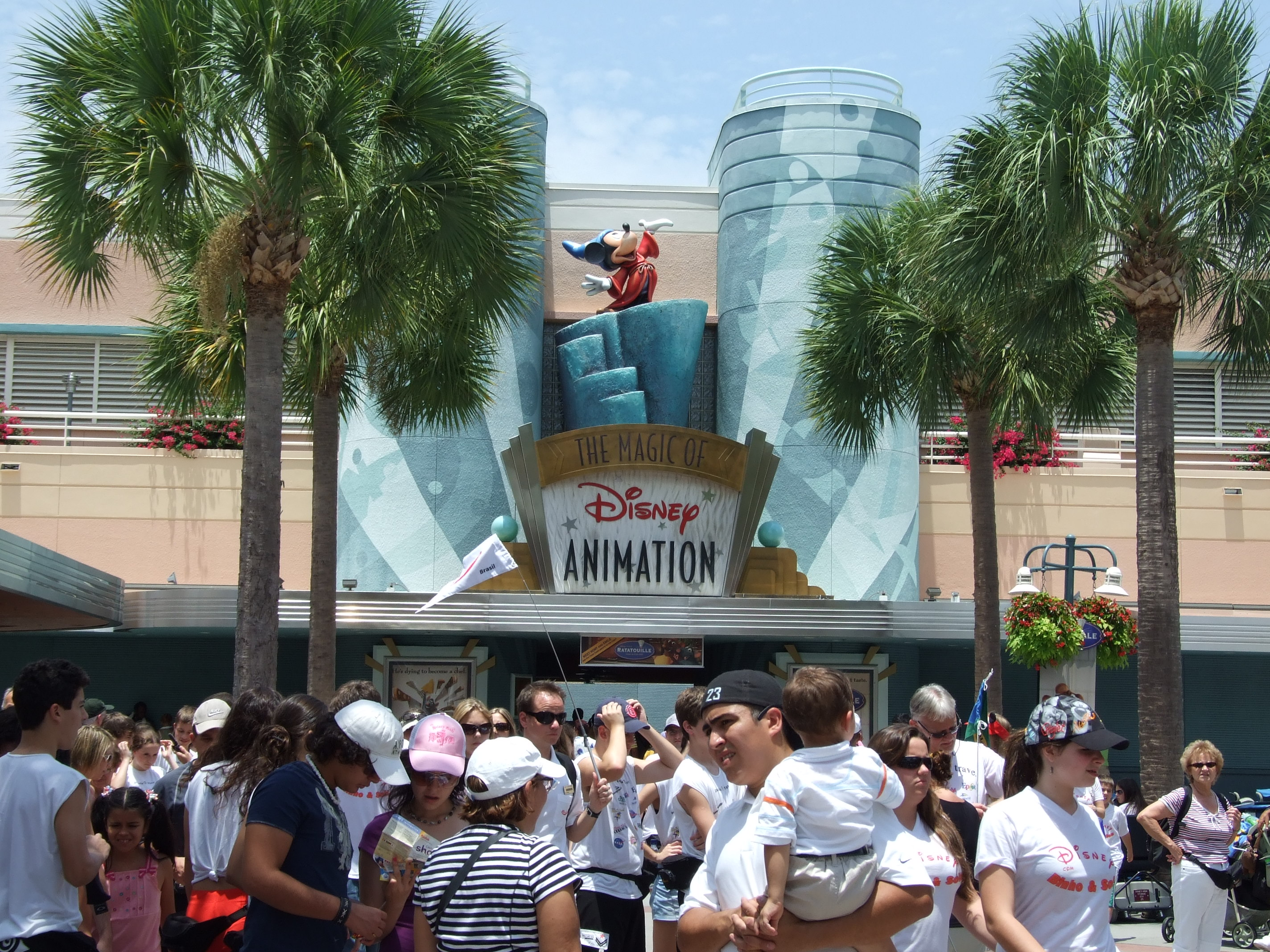
- The entrance to The Magic of Disney Animation, during its original version, featuring a statue of Sorcerer Mickey from Fantasia

Disney's Hollywood Studios
- Area: Animation Courtyard (1989–2015); Walt Disney Studios (2026–present)
- Coordinates: 28.357958°N 81.561048°W
- Status: Operating
- Soft opening date: September 9, 2026 (Updated version)
- Opening date: May 1, 1989 (Original version); September 14, 2026 (Updated version)
- Closing date: July 12, 2015 (Original version)
- Replaced: Studio Backlot Tour (Streets of America) (Original version); Star Wars Launch Bay (Animation Courtyard) (Updated version)
- Replaced by: Star Wars Launch Bay (Animation Courtyard) (Original version)

Ride statistics
- Attraction type: Interactive tour
- Designer: Walt Disney Imagineering
- Model: Animation studio
- Theme: Walt Disney Animation Studios
- Wheelchair accessible
- Assistive listening available

The Magic of Disney Animation is an interactive tour and attraction located at Disney's Hollywood Studios at Walt Disney World Resort in Orlando, Florida. Inspired by the 2023 animated short Once Upon a Studio, the attraction portrays an "open house" at Walt Disney Animation Studios with the studio's canon of animated characters acting as hosts.

A previous incarnation of the attraction operated at the park from May 1, 1989 until July 12, 2015. In the original version, a live animator would show guests how the characters in Disney animated films were chosen and designed. In December 2015, the building began to be used to house the Star Wars Launch Bay.

== History ==
Originally, when the park first opened on May 1, 1989, the Feature Animation pavilion of "The Magic of Disney Animation", designed originally by award-winning experience designer Bob Rogers and his design team BRC Imagination Arts, included four connected experiences which explored the legacy of Disney animation. The tour commenced with the live action/animated short film entitled "Back to Neverland" in which veteran newscaster, Walter Cronkite and comedian Robin Williams guided guests through the different stages in animating a feature-length film by turning Williams into an animated character in the form of one of the Lost Boys of Peter Pan. Following that introductory film, guest would witness the process of animation, first-hand, from elevated, glass-enclosed walkways within Disney's actual animation studio. Several original cels from Disney films as well as several of the Academy Awards won by Disney films were on display at the attraction. The third segment of the animation tour was a short film in which Disney Animators described the joy of the art of animation. A finale film, entitled "Classic Disney" presented a montage of key moments from animated Disney films and shorts.

An expanded production area was dedicated and opened on April 22, 1998, the same day Disney's Animal Kingdom opened. Chairman Roy E. Disney noted it in his dedication speech.

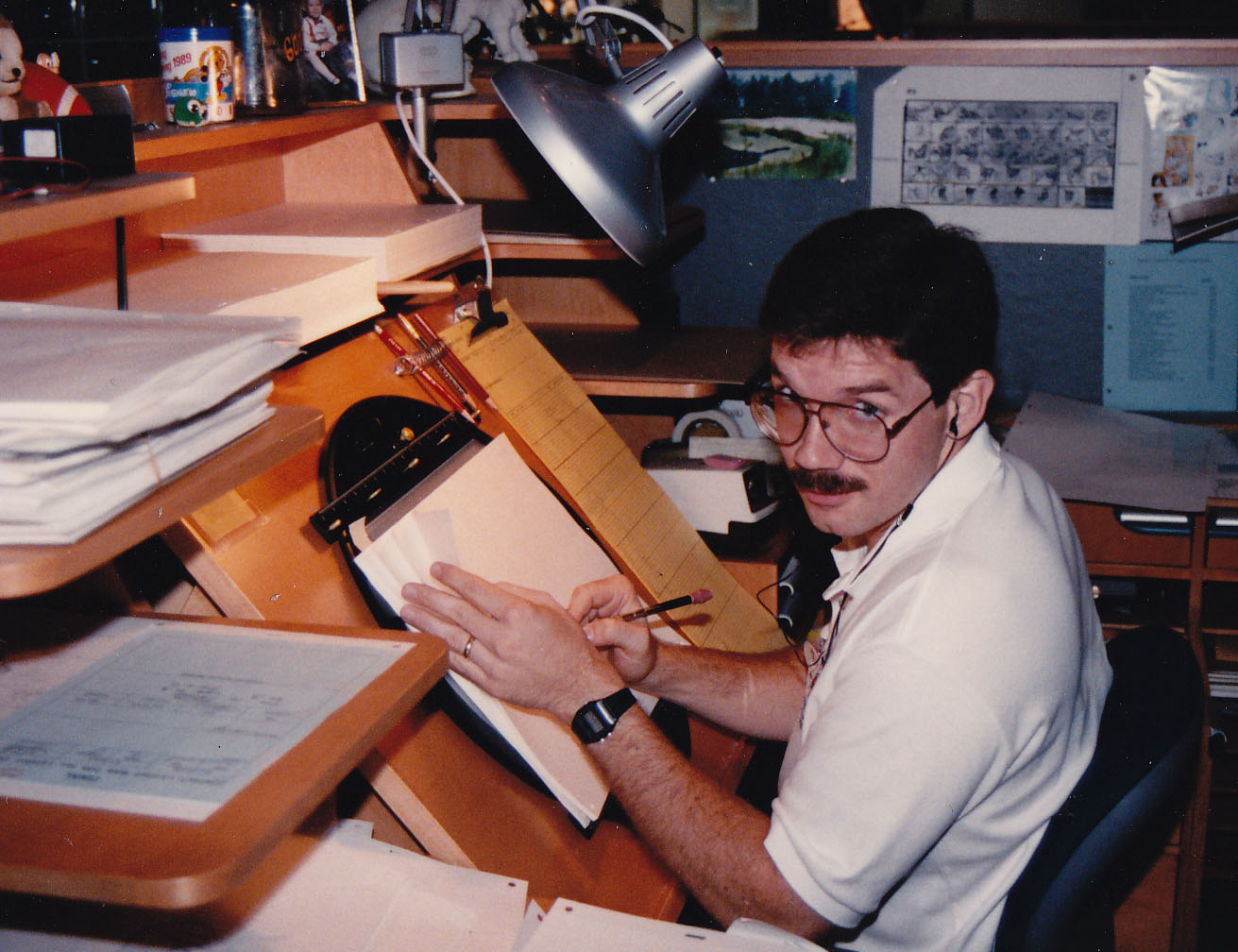
Disney Animator Mark Henn at work in 1989

After the Orlando, Florida division of Walt Disney Feature Animation closed on January 12, 2004, the preshow was changed to one main showroom where a Disney animator showed guests how the characters in Disney animated films were chosen and designed, with the help of Mushu, the dragon from Disney's Mulan (voiced in the show by Eddie Murphy's sound double, Mark Moseley). After guests left the showroom, they were led to the area of the former studio with interactive games and a chance to meet characters from the latest Disney animated pictures. There was also a section called Animation Academy, where guests could draw their favorite Disney characters, under the guidance of a Disney animator.

=== Closure ===
The Magic of Disney Animation closed on July 12, 2015 and was replaced by Star Wars Launch Bay, an interactive walkthrough attraction based on the Star Wars franchise and in anticipation of the upcoming film, Star Wars: The Force Awakens, a direct sequel to the original Star Wars trilogy.

=== Reopening ===
On July 22, 2025, it was announced that Star Wars Launch Bay would close and The Magic of Disney Animation would return on September 14, 2026. The building's facade was renovated to resemble the Roy E. Disney Animation Building at the Walt Disney Studios in Burbank. The guest experience inside the building includes a permanent screening of the short film Once Upon a Studio, released during the centennial of The Walt Disney Company in 2023. The former Animation Courtyard was also renovated to resemble the buildings of the Disney Studios. The Animation Academy returned to the building as "Olaf Draws!", hosted by an audio-animatronic figure of Olaf (voiced by Josh Gad), "Off The Page!", a meet-and-greet section, and Drawn to Wonderland, an Alice in Wonderland-themed playground for toddlers.

== Magic of Disney Animation productions ==
Inside the building which housed The Magic of Disney Animation, were the former production facilities of Walt Disney Feature Animation Florida. Some of its productions included:

- Ink and paint for The Little Mermaid (1989)
- Two of the three Who Framed Roger Rabbit spinoff cartoons; Roller Coaster Rabbit (1990) and Trail Mix-Up (1993)
- The "Be Our Guest" sequence from Beauty and the Beast (1991)
- Off His Rockers short (1992)
- The concept design and animation of Jasmine from Aladdin (1992)
- The "I Just Can't Wait to Be King" sequence from The Lion King (1994)
- Mulan (1998)
- John Henry short (2000)
- Lilo & Stitch (2002)
- Brother Bear (2003)

== Films shown during the attraction ==
=== Original version (1989–2015) ===
- Flowers and Trees
- Snow White and the Seven Dwarfs
- Brave Little Tailor
- The Ugly Duckling
- Pinocchio
- Fantasia
- Dumbo
- Bambi
- Make Mine Music
- Song of the South
- Melody Time
- The Adventures of Ichabod and Mr. Toad
- Cinderella
- Alice in Wonderland
- Peter Pan
- Lady and the Tramp
- Sleeping Beauty
- One Hundred and One Dalmatians
- The Sword in the Stone
- Mary Poppins
- Winnie the Pooh and the Honey Tree
- The Jungle Book
- The Rescuers
- The Fox and the Hound
- The Black Cauldron
- The Great Mouse Detective

=== Updated version (2026–present) ===
- Steamboat Willie
- Three Little Pigs
- Snow White and the Seven Dwarfs
- Pinocchio
- Fantasia
- Dumbo
- Bambi
- Cinderella
- Alice in Wonderland
- Peter Pan
- Lady and the Tramp
- Sleeping Beauty
- One Hundred and One Dalmatians
- The Sword in the Stone
- The Jungle Book
- The Many Adventures of Winnie the Pooh
- The Rescuers
- Once Upon a Mouse
- The Little Mermaid
- The Rescuers Down Under
- Beauty and the Beast
- Aladdin
- The Lion King
- Pocahontas
- Mulan
- Tarzan
- Fantasia 2000
- Lilo & Stitch
- Home on the Range
- The Princess and the Frog
- Tangled
- Winnie the Pooh
- Wreck-It Ralph
- Frozen
- Big Hero 6
- Zootopia
- Moana
- Ralph Breaks the Internet
- Frozen 2
- Raya and the Last Dragon
- Encanto
- Strange World
- Wish
- Moana 2
- Zootopia 2
- Hexed

== Courtyard handprints ==
During the original version of the attraction, handprints of Disney animators Marc Davis, Ken Anderson, Ken O'Connor, Ollie Johnston, Frank Thomas and Ward Kimball were present in the courtyard when it opened on May 1, 1989. The handprints were removed when the area was closed and converted to Star Wars Launch Bay. When the attraction was set to reopen in 2026, handprints, paw prints, shoe prints, footprints and signatures of animated Disney characters were added to the courtyard including:

- Beast
- Belle
- Berlioz, Marie and Toulouse
- Big Bad Wolf
- Bruno Madrigal
- Chicken Little
- Cruella de Vil
- Hercules and Pegasus
- Jafar and Iago
- John Silver
- Little John
- Maui
- Mirabel Madrigal
- Moana (with Hei Hei's footprints)
- Mowgli
- Mufasa and Simba
- Oswald the Lucky Rabbit
- Pocahontas
- Quasimodo
- Robin Hood
- Stitch
- Tiana
- Ursula
- Vanellope von Schweetz
- Winnie the Pooh and Piglet
- Wreck-It Ralph
- Yensid
