= Tony Bancroft =

American animator and film director (born 1967)

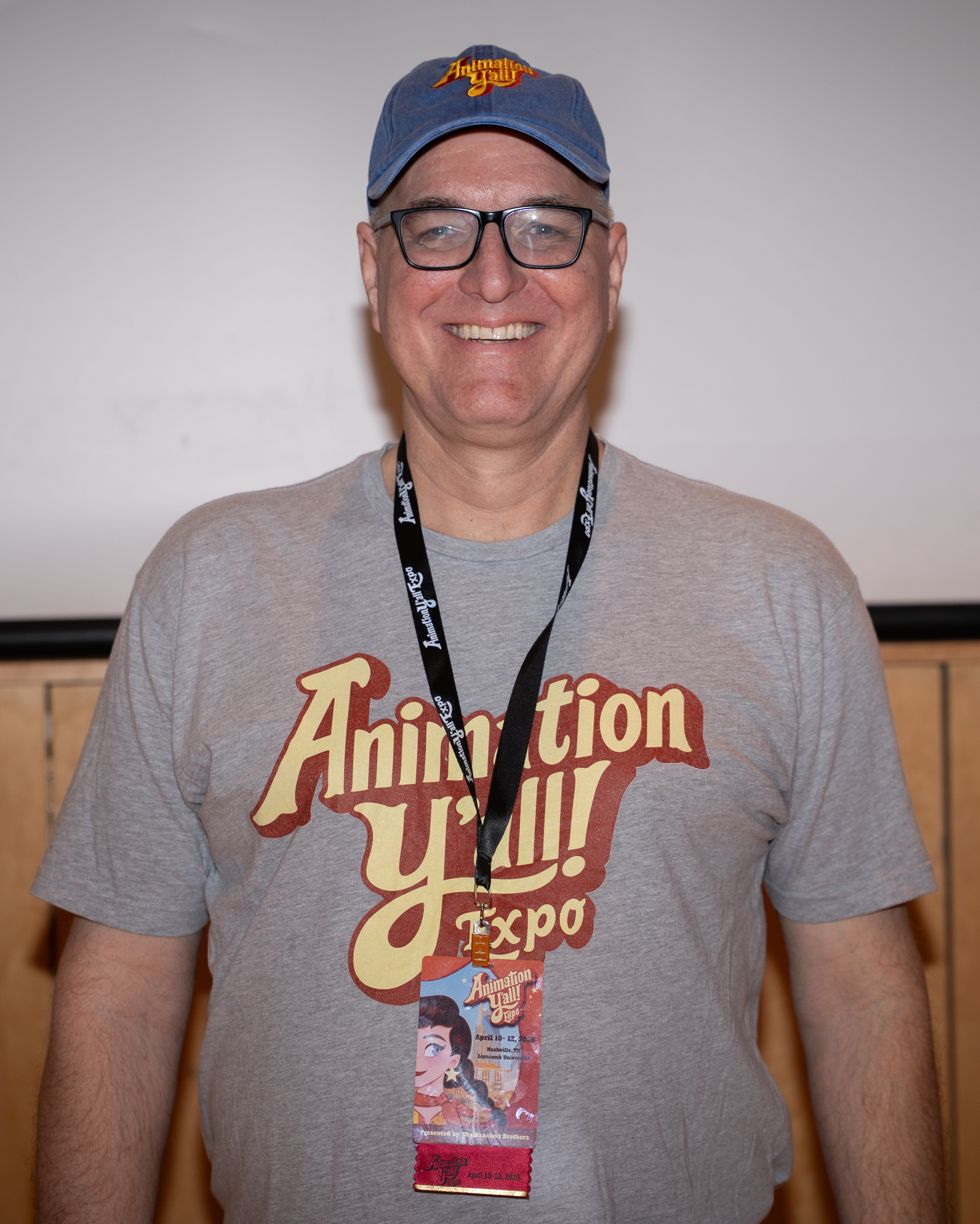
- Bancroft in 2026
- Born: Orange County, California, U.S.
- Education: CalArts
- Occupations: Director, animator
- Years active: 1988–present
- Notable work: Mulan
- Spouse: Rene Bancroft
- Children: 3
- Relatives: Tom Bancroft (twin brother)
- Awards: Annie Award, 1998; VES Award, 2003; Uzeta Award, 2019
- Website: tonybancroft.com

Tony Bancroft is an American animator and film director who frequently collaborates with Disney. He is the founder and owner of the faith-driven animation company Toonacious Family Entertainment. Tony is the Executive VP Creative Development and Production for DivideNine Animation Studios.

== Life and career ==
A native Californian, Bancroft grew up in Orange County. After a two-year stint at Cypress College, he enrolled in the character animation program at CalArts. This led to a summer job as a production assistant with filmmaker Ralph Bakshi and ultimately to an internship in California with Disney Feature Animation followed by a full-time position at the new Florida animation facility. Bancroft (along with his twin brother Tom) was selected to be among the first group of animators to work at the Disney-MGM Studios. During his one-year stay in Florida, he had his first official assignment as an assistant cleanup animator on Roger Rabbit in Roller Coaster Rabbit. This was followed by a credit as animating assistant on The Rescuers Down Under working on the character of "Frank the frill-necked lizard".

In 1990, he returned to California and worked as a character animator on Beauty and the Beast and Aladdin before being promoted to supervising animator role on The Lion King. After working on the character design and some preliminary animation for the gargoyle characters in The Hunchback of Notre Dame, he was tapped to join Barry Cook as a director on Mulan.

He was animation supervisor on Stuart Little 2 at Sony Pictures Imageworks during 2002, and founded Toonacious that same year. Bancroft also served as English voice director on Hayao Miyazaki's Porco Rosso in 2003.

In 2012, Bancroft authored the book: Directing for Animation : Everything You Didn't Learn in Art School ISBN 978-0240818023 published by Focal Press. The book explores the directing process, with insights from noted directors including Dean DeBlois, Pete Docter, Eric Goldberg, Tim Miller, John Musker, Jennifer Yuh Nelson, Nick Park and Chris Wedge.

In 2014, Bancroft and his brother Tom, began The Bancroft Brothers Animation Podcast, which focuses on the animation industry, featuring interviews with creators and those involved. The podcast celebrated its 100th episode with guest Mark Henn in a July 2018 live show presented via Skype, for animation classes at Lipscomb University in Tennessee, where each brother teaches.

For some time, Bancroft was working on pre-production and directing an animated film, titled Bunyan and Babe, which was released in 2017.

In March 2018, it was announced that Bancroft would join Azusa Pacific University as the head of the school's new Animation and Visual Effects degree program beginning in the fall of that year.

In 2018, Bancroft also was an animator on Mary Poppins Returns.

Bancroft is currently a storyboard artist at Warner Bros. Animation, after he was one of the traditional animators on Space Jam: A New Legacy.

== Personal life ==
Bancroft and his wife, Rene, have three daughters, Caitlin, Savannah, and Sierra. They returned to Los Angeles after living in Florida during the production of Mulan. He has a twin brother named Tom who is also an animator.

He is a Christian, and credits God for his talents as an animator and director.

== Filmography ==
Year	Title	Notes	Characters
1988	Mighty Mouse: The New Adventures (TV Series)	Production Coordinator – 6 Episodes	
1990	Roller Coaster Rabbit (Short)	Assistant Animator	
1990	The Rescuers Down Under	Assistant Animator	
1991	Beauty and the Beast	Animator	Cogsworth
1992	Off His Rockers (Short)	Visual Development Artist	
1992	Aladdin	Animator	Iago
1993	Bonkers (TV Series)	Character Animation – 1 Episode	
1994	The Lion King	Supervising Animator	Pumbaa
1994	Disney's Animated Storybook: The Lion King (Video Game)	Animator	
1996	The Hunchback of Notre Dame	Additional Animator	
1998	Mulan	Director with Barry Cook	
2000	The Emperor's New Groove	Supervising Animator	Kronk
2002	Stuart Little 2	Animation Supervisor	
2003	Lenny & Sid	Creator / Director / Character Design	
2004	One by One (Video Short)	Animator	
2005	The Origin of Stitch (Video Short)	Animator	
2008	Wild About Safety: Timon and Pumbaa Safety Smart at Home! (Short)	Animator	
2009	Wild About Safety: Timon and Pumbaa Safety Smart Goes Green! (Video Short)	Animator	
2009	Wild About Safety: Timon and Pumbaa Safety Smart In the Water! (Video Short)	Animator	
2011	The Smurfs: A Christmas Carol (Short)	Animator	
2011	Kung Fu Panda: Secrets of the Masters	Animator: Duncan Studio Production	
2016	Norm of the North	Additional Storyboard Artist	
2017	Bunyan and Babe	Storyboard Artist / Additional Voices	
2017	Animal Crackers	Director	
2018	Mary Poppins Returns	Animator	
2019	Red Shoes and the Seven Dwarfs	Voice Director	
2019	Mosley	Executive Producer	
2021	Space Jam: A New Legacy	Animator	Daffy Duck
2023	Once Upon a Studio (Short)	Animator	Timon and Pumbaa
	Lenny & Sid (shorts)	Creator	
2025	Light of the World	Head of story / Animation director	

== Awards ==
- In 1998, Bancroft received the Annie Award for Outstanding Achievement in Directing, along with co-director Barry Cook for Mulan.
- In 2003, Bancroft received the Visual Effects Society Award for Best Character Animation in an Animated Motion Picture, along with David Schaub, Eric Armstrong, and Sean Mullen, for Stuart Little 2.
- In 2019, Bancroft received the Uzeta Award at the Etna International Festival of Comics and Pop Culture in Catania, Italy for Best Cross-Media Artist for The Return of Mary Poppins
