= Walt Disney Feature Animation Florida =

Former subsidiary of Disney Animation

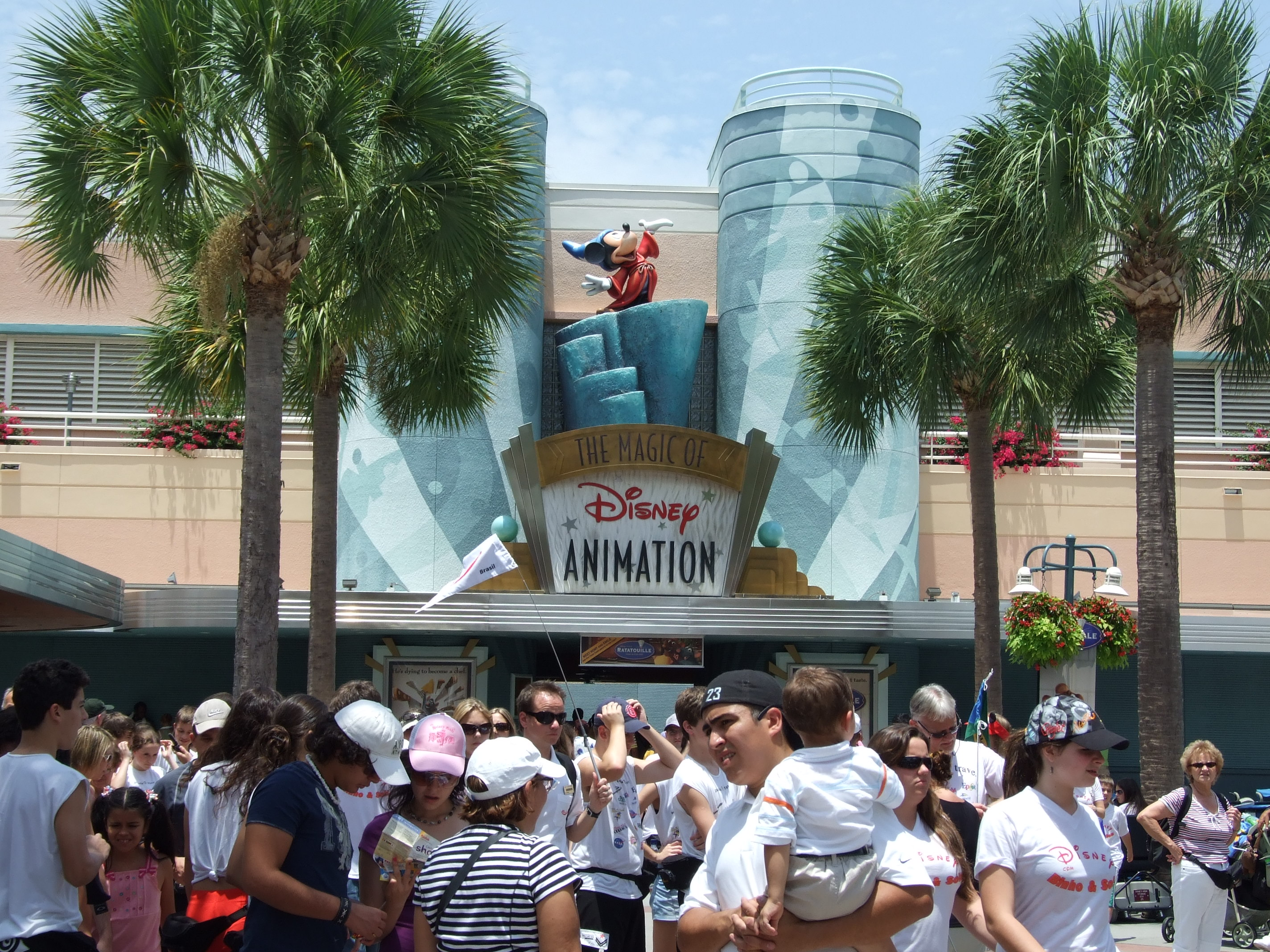
- Magic of Disney Animation's location
- Type: Division (1989–1992, 1999–2005); Subsidiary (1992–1999)
- Industry: Entertainment
- Founded: May 1, 1989; 37 years ago
- Founder: Max Howard
- Defunct: January 12, 2005; 21 years ago
- Fate: Closed
- Successor: Circle Seven Animation
- Headquarters: The Magic of Disney Animation, Animation Courtyard, Disney-MGM Studios, Walt Disney World, Bay Lake, Florida, United States
- Key people: Max Howard; (Director of Operations); Andrew Millstein (SVP and GM)
- Production output: Animation
- Number of employees: ~400 (peak, mid-1990s); 258 (final)
- Parent: Walt Disney Feature Animation (Walt Disney Studios)
- Website: www.wdfaf.com

Walt Disney Feature Animation Florida was a division of Walt Disney Feature Animation that operated from 1989 to 2005. Its offices were located on the backlot of the Disney-MGM Studios theme park and visitors were allowed to tour the studio in The Magic of Disney Animation attraction to observe animators at work from behind glass-paneled overhead breezeways. The division had primarily animated The Little Mermaid (1989), Beauty and the Beast (1991), Aladdin (1992), The Rescuers Down Under (1990), The Lion King (1994) Mulan (1998), Lilo & Stitch (2002) and Brother Bear (2003).

== History ==
Walt Disney Animation placed Max Howard in charge of starting up its Florida animation studio in 1988. Walt Disney Feature Animation Florida began operations on May 1, 1989 with 40 employees. The division was originally planned to work on featurettes and shorts that they could do on its own. 70 animators including Disney veteran supervising animator Mark Henn were hired by 1990. After doing its first work, the Roger Rabbit short, Roller Coaster Rabbit (1990), the division was enlisted to help finish The Rescuers Down Under (1990) and work on its companion featurette, The Prince and the Pauper. In the years to come, the Florida unit would continue to make contributions to several of Disney's animated features. On October 7, 1992, the Florida unit was incorporated. On April 22, 1998, Walt Disney Feature Animation Florida moved to a new $70 million facility at the Disney-MGM Studios. In June 1998, the Florida division's first feature film, Mulan, was released. The unit continued as a division with its corporate form was merged out on September 30, 1999. Andrew Millstein took charge of the division as senior vice president and general manager of production in 2001 transferring in from The Secret Lab.

In January 2003, Disney initiated a reorganization of its theatrical and animation units to improve resource usage and continued focus on new characters and franchise development. Additionally, Feature Animation was transferred under the Walt Disney Studios in January 2003. In June 2003, 50 animators were laid off after Brother Bear finished up production. The division was developing A Few Good Ghosts (also known as My Peoples) until it was canceled on November 15, 2003. On January 12, 2004, Disney Feature Animation President David Stainton announced the shut down of Walt Disney Feature Animation Florida.

Some laid-off animators were offered transfers to the main studio while most chose to stay in Orlando or were recruited to work for rival animation studios. Other animators created their own startup studios. Legacy Animation Studios was formed by Eddie Pittman along with 15 artists previously laid off from the company. Laid off animators Travis Blaise, Todd Gilbert and Matt Gunther formed their own company, Magnetic Entertainment. Some were also recruited by schools such as Digipen Institute of Technology and hiring the likes of Jazno Francoeur, Dan Daly, Antony De Fato, Peter Moherle, Pamela Mathues, Richard Morgan, Chris Poplin, Travis Blaise, Geraldine Kovats and Woody Woodman, who would each spend some time teaching at DigiPen.

Project Firefly, now Premise Entertainment, was set up on Universal Studios Florida's backlot by former employees Paulo Alvarado, Gregg Azzopardi, Dominic Carola, John Webber and Glen Gagnon, and worked on Curious George (2006) for Universal, alongside two direct to videos for DisneyToon Studios; Pooh's Heffalump Halloween Movie (2005) and Brother Bear 2 (2006), Farm Force (2005), a short/pilot as an internal project, and Disney's The Princess and the Frog (2009). Millstein was tapped to head up Florida's replacement and Pixar sequel division, Circle Seven Animation.

== Filmography ==
As Sole Producer

Release date	Title	Notes
June 15, 1990	Roller Coaster Rabbit	Released with Dick Tracy
July 17, 1992	Off His Rockers	Released with Honey, I Blew Up the Kid
March 12, 1993	Trail Mix-Up	Released with A Far Off Place
June 19, 1998	Mulan	
October 30, 1999	Mickey Mouse Works	How to Haunt a House
October 30, 2000	John Henry	
June 21, 2002	Lilo & Stitch	
November 1, 2003	Brother Bear	

As Animation Service

Release date	Title	Notes
November 17, 1989	The Little Mermaid	Ink and paint Co-produced with Walt Disney Feature Animation
November 16, 1990	The Prince and the Pauper	10 minutes Co-produced with Walt Disney Feature Animation
November 16, 1990	The Rescuers Down Under	10 minutes Co-produced with Walt Disney Feature Animation
November 22, 1991	Beauty and the Beast	10 minutes including partial animation of Belle and the "Be Our Guest" sequence Co-produced with Walt Disney Feature Animation
November 25, 1992	Aladdin	10 minutes and the partial animation of Princess Jasmine; Co-produced with Walt Disney Feature Animation
June 24, 1994	The Lion King	22 minutes including the "I Just Can't Wait to Be King" sequence Co-produced with Walt Disney Feature Animation
June 23, 1995	Pocahontas	18 minutes Co-produced with Walt Disney Feature Animation
June 21, 1996	The Hunchback of Notre Dame	4 minutes Co-produced with Walt Disney Feature Animation and Walt Disney Feature Animation France
June 27, 1997	Hercules	10 minutes Co-produced with Walt Disney Feature Animation and Walt Disney Feature Animation France
June 18, 1999	Tarzan	Co-produced with Walt Disney Feature Animation and Walt Disney Feature Animation France
January 1, 2000	Fantasia 2000	"Firebird Suite—1919 Version" Segment; Co-produced with Walt Disney Feature Animation and Walt Disney Feature Animation France
December 15, 2000	The Emperor's New Groove	Co-produced with Walt Disney Feature Animation and Walt Disney Feature Animation France
June 15, 2001	Atlantis: The Lost Empire	Co-produced with Walt Disney Feature Animation and Walt Disney Feature Animation France
September 3, 2002	Mickey's House of Villains	"How to Haunt a House" Segment; Co-produced with Walt Disney Television Animation, Toon City Animation, and Walt Disney Television Animation (Australia)
November 27, 2002	Treasure Planet	Co-produced with Walt Disney Feature Animation and Walt Disney Feature Animation France
