= My Last Day =

My Last Day may refer to:

- "My Last Day" (Scrubs episode), the 2002 last episode of the first season of Scrubs
- My Last Day (film), a 2011 anime short by Studio 4°C about Jesus Christ
- My Last Day (album), a 2007 album by Kim Hiorthøy
