= Mark Henn =

American animator (born 1958)

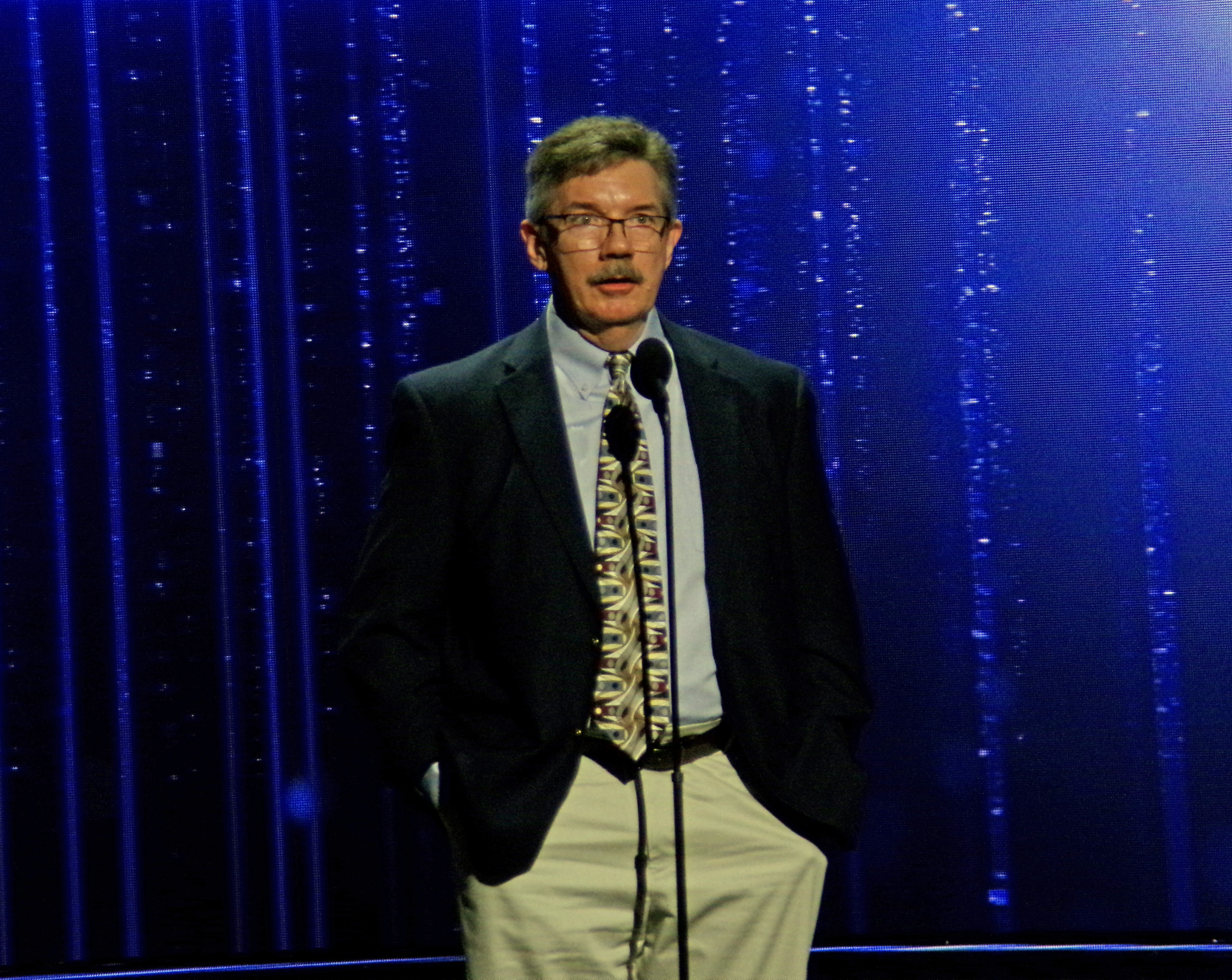
- Henn delivering his acceptance speech at the 2024 Disney Legends Ceremony
- Born: Mark Alan Henn; April 6, 1958 (age 68); Dayton, Ohio, U.S.
- Occupations: Animator, film director
- Years active: 1978–2023
- Employer: Walt Disney Animation Studios (1980–2023)
- Spouse: Deborah Lou Hall (m. 1981)
- Children: 2
- Awards: Winsor McCay Award, 2013, Disney Legend, 2024

Mark Alan Henn (born April 6, 1958) is an American animator and film director. His work includes animated characters for Walt Disney Animation Studios films, most notably leading or titular characters and heroines. He served as the lead animator for Basil, Dr. David Q. Dawson, and Olivia in The Great Mouse Detective (1986), Oliver, Jenny, and Dodger in Oliver & Company (1988), Ariel in The Little Mermaid (1989), Bernard and Bianca in The Rescuers Down Under (1990), Belle in Beauty and the Beast (1991), Jasmine in Aladdin (1992), Young Simba in The Lion King (1994), the title character in Mulan (1998), Grace, Wesley, Rusty, and Pearl Gesner in Home on the Range (2004), Ronno in Bambi II (2006), Tiana in The Princess and the Frog (2009), and Winnie the Pooh and Christopher Robin in Winnie the Pooh (2011). Since many of these characters are Disney Princesses, he came to be known as the "princess guy" around the studio. He directed the short films John Henry (2000) and D.I.Y. Duck (2024). Henn spent a total of 43 years at Walt Disney Animation Studios, from 1980 until his retirement in 2023.

== Early life ==
Henn grew up in Dayton, Ohio. At seven years old, Henn watched a reissue of Cinderella (1950) and decided to become an animator. He also viewed The Reluctant Dragon remembering a scene of "Ward Kimball drawing a scene of Goofy. He picked up all that paper, started flipping and everything kind of came to life. From then on, the animation bug beats hard for me."

In 1976, Henn graduated from Trotwood-Madison High School. He next attended Bowling Green State University and sent an animation portfolio to the Disney studios, but did not accept it though they recognized his potential. He then attended Sinclair Community College and sent a second portfolio, which was rejected. He sent a third portfolio a semester later, to which he received a rejection letter from Don Duckwall, the studio's production manager. Henn recalled, "[Duckwall] sent a nice rejection letter back and he wrote a sentence that was burned into my memory saying that it wasn't that I wasn't a good artist, but they just didn't think I had what it took to travel the narrow roads that their animators travel."

In 1978, he attended the California Institute of the Arts (CalArts) and was accepted into the Character Animation program. His professors there included former Disney animators Jack Hannah, Elmer Plummer, Jack Kinney, T. Hee, Bob McCrea, and Ken O'Connor, while his fellow classmates included Joe Ranft, Mark Dindal and John Lasseter.

== Career ==
=== 1980–1988: Initial years ===
In 1980, Henn was hired by Walt Disney Productions and entered the animation training program where he was mentored by Eric Larson. He began work as an inbetweener for Glen Keane on The Fox and the Hound (1981). According to Henn, Keane was finishing the climactic bear fight scene and Henn worked with him on that. He was promoted to animator less than a year later for Mickey's Christmas Carol (1983), in which he animated Mickey Mouse. Henn looked to past Mickey Mouse shorts animated by Freddie Moore, Frank Thomas, and Ollie Johnston for inspiration; overall, he remembered, "He [Mickey] was an easy character to get, for me at least. Putting him in the role of Bob Cratchit was a perfect match as far as casting goes."

On The Black Cauldron (1985), Henn was initially assigned the role of Creeper, the Horned King's assistant. He also animated scenes of Gurgi and Fflewddur Fflam. He next joined The Great Mouse Detective (1986), primarily animating Basil, Dawson and Olivia, as well as Ratigan in a few scenes where he confronts Basil. On the next animated film Oliver & Company (1988), Henn mainly animated Oliver and his human owner, Jenny. For the 60th Academy Awards telecast, in April 1988, Henn, along with Rob Minkoff and Nancy Beiman, animated Mickey Mouse as he presented the Academy Award for Best Animated Short Film.

=== 1989–1998: Move to Orlando, animating Disney Princesses ===
In 1988, Henn was selected by directors John Musker and Ron Clements as one of the two supervising animators for the character Ariel in The Little Mermaid (1989), alongside Glen Keane. The animation workload was divided by Keane, who mostly animated Ariel during the underwater scenes, whereas Henn animated her in the film's opening scene and when she was a human. A year later, Henn moved to Orlando, Florida to work at the newly-opened Feature Animation Florida studio at the Disney-MGM Studios. His first assignment there was The Rescuers Down Under (1990) animating the lead characters Bernard and Miss Bianca, as well as the villain Percival C. McLeach. For the mice characters, Henn studied the mannerisms of Bob Newhart and Eva Gabor during voice recording sessions, and looked to George C. Scott's performance in Dr. Strangelove (1964) for inspiration while animating McLeach.

For Beauty and the Beast (1991), Henn was next assigned as a supervising animator for Belle, sharing the role with James Baxter. For character reference, Henn decorated his studio with photographs of famous women, specifically Hollywood actresses Natalie Wood, Elizabeth Taylor, Grace Kelly, and Audrey Hepburn. However, Henn hardly met the character's voice actress Paige O'Hara apart from rare occasions when he would travel to California for production meetings. Regardless, he incorporated O'Hara's mannerisms during the recording sessions into the animation, including her pushing a lock of hair off her forehead. Meanwhile, Glen Keane was the supervising animator for the Beast at the studio's California division. To coordinate the staging of the characters, Keane and Henn agreed the characters who were most dominant in their scenes would be animated first. For scenes in which the Beast was most dominant, Keane animated first and placed scribbles for Belle. The animation was then exchanged through the 3000–mile distance via an overnight courier.

Having animated two previous Disney heroines—Ariel from The Little Mermaid and Belle from Beauty and the Beast, respectively—Henn was afraid he had been typecast when he was assigned his third heroine, Jasmine. By this point, he had been dubbed as the "Julia Roberts of Disney animation". In search for new inspiration, Henn stated, "I just reached into my pocket, and I still had my sister's high-school graduation picture. I looked at it, and at the time her hair was a roundish haircut shape that surrounded her face, and we were playing with things like that, so I essentially modeled Jasmine on my younger sister Beth." Linda Larkin was hired to provide Jasmine's speaking voice and discussed the role with Henn during a dinner meeting at the Disney-MGM studios. Robina Ritchie, a model, was hired to provide live-action reference for the animation, pantomiming actions to the recording of Larkin's voice-overs so, in Henn's words, "the animator gets the feeling of what the real human movement would be."

In 1993, Henn starred as himself in Full House for "The House Meets the Mouse" episode. Henn remembered Max Howard, then the head of the Feature Animation Florida studio, called him into his office and asked if he was willing to appear in the episode. Henn agreed and was handed his dialogue pages.

When he became involved with The Lion King (1994), Henn initially expressed interest in animating the film's villain, Scar, because he wanted to do "something different." However, producer Don Hahn felt that he was better suited for animating Simba. Before animating the character, Henn and his animators visited the Miami Metrozoo to observe African lions. His colleague Ruben Aquino handled the animation for adult Simba at the studio's California division. To ensure a smooth transition between the cub and adult versions, Henn animated adult Simba at the end of the "Hakuna Matata" sequence. Before the film's release, during the summer of 1994, Henn was slated to work on Mulan (1998), in which he accompanied Pam Coats, Barry Cook, Ric Sluiter, and Robert Walker on a research trip to China.

However, Mulan (1998) was pushed back into development due to unresolved story problems. Henn then joined Pocahontas (1995), which was already in production, and animated several scenes of the title character. When Mulan was ready for production, Henn animated Fa Mulan and her father Fa Zhao. During production, Henn stated: "I was asked to not only animate Mulan, but I was also asked by the directors to animate her father as well, Fa Zhou because it was that relationship which was the heart and soul of that picture. That was the tension."

=== 1999–2006: Directorial debut, transition to computer animation ===
In 1999, Henn made his directorial debut with the animated short John Henry (2000). Afraid it would offend Black American audiences, the film's release was suppressed by Disney. It premiered at the Heartland International Film Festival, where Henn was awarded the Crystal Heart Award. Afterwards, it was screened for three days as a double feature with a re-release of The Nightmare Before Christmas (1993) at the El Capitan Theatre.

During early development on Lilo & Stitch (2002), Henn was initially meant to animate Stitch, but after ten years in Florida, he decided to relocate to Burbank, California. Despite this, Henn was asked to animate female hula dancers during the opening scene, in which he returned to Orlando. Back in California, Henn animated on Home on the Range (2004) animating several characters such as the cow Grace, the dog Rusty, Wesley, and the farm owner Pearl Gesner (shared with Bruce W. Smith).

Henn began his first CG animation role on Meet the Robinsons (2007), animating Lewis and the family members. However, he struggled with the transition to computer animation and found the assignment very difficult. Shortly after, Henn, along with Andreas Deja and other 2D animators, were loaned out to James Baxter Animation to animate Giselle for the live-action/animated film Enchanted (2007).

=== 2007–2023: Return to traditional animation ===
In 2006, John Lasseter and Ed Catmull became the new management heads of Walt Disney Animation Studios. Lasseter and Catmull reopened a new shorts program to experiment with the new animation techniques. Henn returned to Disney to animate Goofy on the 2007 animated short How to Hook Up Your Home Theater. The short implemented a paperless technique by using Harmony and Wacom Cintiq pressure-sensitive tablets, but Henn found the approach too difficult and resumed using pencil and paper.

In 2007, he was assigned his next heroine Tiana for The Princess and the Frog (2009). In an interview, Henn stated he animated her human form "fairly naturalistically" while he went more broad when animating her as a frog. Following this, he was the supervising animator of Winnie the Pooh and Christopher Robin in the 2011 film Winnie the Pooh. In December 2011, the long-gestating Snow Queen project, initially planned to be a 2D animated film, was rechristened into a CG animated film titled Frozen (2013). Henn remained on the project as an animation consultant, providing 2D character tests for the CG animation team to improve the performance and timing. During the same time, he animated Pete on the short film Get a Horse! (2013), which was attached with Frozen. He again served as an animation consultant on Big Hero 6 (2014) and Ralph Breaks the Internet (2018).

On Moana (2016), Henn animated Maui's tattoos, as well the prologue and the stylized visuals on the tapa cloth for several sequences. In 2022, Henn, along with Eric Goldberg, Jin Kim, and others, were featured in the Disney+ documentary series Sketchbook.

In December 2023, Henn retired from Disney Animation Studios, having worked there for 43 years. His last project for the studio was D.I.Y Duck, a short film starring Donald Duck, which he directed.

== Accolades ==
Throughout his career, Henn has been nominated for an Annie Award four times: three times for Character Animation for The Lion King, Mulan, and Winnie the Pooh, and once for Short Animated Film Direction for John Henry.

In 2013, Henn was the recipient of the Winsor McCay Award for lifetime achievement in animation.

On August 11, 2024, Henn was honored by the Walt Disney Company as a Disney Legend at the Honda Center in Anaheim, California at the conclusion of that year's D23: The Ultimate Disney Fan Event. The actresses who played the five Disney Princesses for whom he had served as the supervising animator―Jodi Benson, Paige O'Hara, Anika Noni Rose, Linda Larkin, and Ming-Na Wen―appeared together on stage to express their gratitude to Henn for creating such memorable animated characters.

== Personal life ==
In 1981, Henn married Deborah Lou Hall, with whom he has two children. In 1998, he started a hobby in sculpting to celebrate American history. He is a Christian.

== Filmography ==
Year	Title	Credits	Characters	Notes
1981	The Fox and the Hound	Inbetween Artist	Bear	uncredited
1983	Mickey's Christmas Carol (Short)	Animator	Mickey Mouse	
1985	The Black Cauldron	Animator		
1986	The Great Mouse Detective	Supervising Animator	Basil, Dr. David Q. Dawson, Olivia	
1987	The Brave Little Toaster	Animator	Kirby and Plugsy	
1988	Oliver & Company	Supervising Animator	Oliver, Jenny, Dodger	
1989	The Little Mermaid	Directing Animator / Supervising Animator, Florida	Ariel	
1990	Roller Coaster Rabbit (Short)	Animator		
1990	The Prince and the Pauper (Short)	Character Animator		
1990	The Rescuers Down Under	Supervising Animator	Bernard and Bianca	
1991	Beauty and the Beast	Supervising Animator	Belle	
1992	Aladdin	Supervising Animator	Jasmine	
1993	Trail Mix-Up (Short)	Character Animator		
1993	Full House: "The House Meets the Mouse" (Part 1) (TV episode)	Himself	Animator	
1994	The Lion King	Supervising Animator	Young Simba	
1995	Pocahontas	Animator	Pocahontas	
1996	Quack Pack (TV Series)	Supervising Animator - 1 Episode		
1998	Mulan	Supervising Animator	Fa Mulan and Fa Zhou	
2000	John Henry (Short)	Director		
2000	The Emperor's New Groove	Additional Animator		
2002	American Legends (Video)	Director - Segment "John Henry"		
2002	Lilo & Stitch	Lead Animator	Hula Dancers	
2004	Home on the Range	Supervising Animator	Grace, Wesley, Rusty and Pearl Gesner	
2006	Bambi II (Video)	Supervising Animator	Ronno	
2007	Meet the Robinsons	Animator		
2007	Enchanted	Animator	Giselle	
2007	How to Hook Up Your Home Theater (Short)	Animator	Goofy	
2009	Pups of Liberty (Short)	Supervising Animator		
2009	The Princess and the Frog	Supervising Animator	Tiana	
2011	The Ballad of Nessie (Short)	Supervising Animator		
2011	Winnie the Pooh	Supervising Animator	Winnie the Pooh and Christopher Robin	
2012	Wreck-It Ralph	Additional Visual Development		
2013	Saving Mr. Banks	Animator: Walt Disney Animation Studios	Tinker Bell	
2013	Get a Horse! (Short)	Animator		
2013	Frozen	Lead 2D Animator		
2013	Twisted: The Untold Story of a Royal Vizier (TV Movie)	Special Thanks		
2014	Big Hero 6	Lead 2D Animator		
2015	Pups of Liberty: The Dog-claration of Independence (Short)	Supervising Animator		
2016	Zootopia	Animator	Judy Hopps and Bellwether	
2016	Disney Art Academy (Video Game)	Special Thanks		Maui (Tattoos)
2016	Moana	Animator		
2018	Ralph Breaks the Internet	2D Animation Supervisor/Animator	Mickey Mouse; Humphrey Bear	
2021	Space Jam: A New Legacy	Supervising Animator		uncredited
2021	Binge Watching (Short)	Supervising Animator	Goofy	
2022	Zootopia+	2D Animator/Opening Sequence Animator		
2022	Mickey in a Minute	Animator	Mickey Mouse	
2022	Oswald the Lucky Rabbit (Short)	Animator		
2023	Once Upon a Studio	Animator	Tinker Bell, Snow White, Grumpy, Flora, Fauna, and Merryweather	
2023	Wish	Additional 2D Animator		
2024	D.I.Y. Duck	Director / Writer / Animator		
