= Mulan (1998 film) =

American animated film

- Theatrical release poster
- Directed by: Barry Cook; Tony Bancroft
- Screenplay by: Rita Hsiao; Chris Sanders; Philip LaZebnik; Raymond Singer; Eugenia Bostwick-Singer
- Story by: Robert D. San Souci
- Based on: Ballad of Mulan by Guo Maoqian
- Produced by: Pam Coats
- Starring: Ming-Na Wen; Eddie Murphy; BD Wong; Miguel Ferrer; June Foray; James Hong; Pat Morita; George Takei
- Edited by: Michael Kelly
- Music by: Jerry Goldsmith
- Production companies: Walt Disney Feature Animation; Walt Disney Feature Animation Florida
- Distributed by: Buena Vista Pictures Distribution (Note: Distributed under the Walt Disney Pictures banner.)
- Release dates: June 5, 1998 (Hollywood Bowl); June 19, 1998 (United States)
- Running time: 88 minutes
- Country: United States
- Language: English
- Budget: $90 million
- Box office: $304 million

Mulan is a 1998 American animated musical coming-of-age action-adventure film based on the Chinese legend of Hua Mulan, and produced by Walt Disney Feature Animation. The film was directed by Barry Cook and Tony Bancroft and produced by Pam Coats, from a screenplay by Rita Hsiao, Chris Sanders, Philip LaZebnik, and the writing team of Raymond Singer and Eugenia Bostwick-Singer, and a story by Robert D. San Souci. It features five original songs that were written by singer-composer Matthew Wilder and lyricist David Zippel, and an original musical orchestral score composed and conducted by Jerry Goldsmith. Ming-Na Wen, Eddie Murphy, Miguel Ferrer, and BD Wong star in the English version as Mulan, Mushu, Shan Yu, and Captain Li Shang, respectively, while Jackie Chan provided the voice of Li Shang for the Chinese dubs of the film. The film's plot takes place in China during an unspecified Imperial dynasty, where Fa Mulan, daughter of aged warrior Fa Zhou, impersonates a man to take her father's place during a general conscription to counter a Hun (Xiongnu) invasion.

Mulan was the first of three features produced primarily at the Disney animation studio at Disney–MGM Studios (now Disney's Hollywood Studios) in Bay Lake, Florida. Development for the film began in 1994, when a number of artistic supervisors were sent to China to receive artistic and cultural inspiration.

Mulan premiered at the Hollywood Bowl in Los Angeles on June 5, 1998, and was released in the United States on June 19. The film received positive reviews from critics and the public, who praised the animation, plot, characters (particularly the title character), and musical score. It was a commercial success, grossing $304 million worldwide against a production budget of $90 million. It earned a Golden Globe and Academy Award nomination for its music and won several Annie Awards, including Best Animated Feature. It was then followed by a direct-to-video sequel, Mulan II in 2004. A live-action remake directed by Niki Caro was released on September 4, 2020.

== Plot ==
The Huns invade China by breaching the Great Wall. The Emperor orders a general mobilization, with conscription notices requiring one man from each family to join the Imperial Army. Fa Mulan, an adventurous young woman, hopes to bring honor to her family. She is arranged to meet a matchmaker to demonstrate her fitness as a future wife, but is deemed a disgrace after several mishaps.

Fa Zhou, Mulan's elderly father and a renowned military veteran, is conscripted. Mulan tries dissuading him from going, but he insists that he must do his duty. Fearing for his life, she cuts her hair and takes her father's sword and armor, disguising herself as a man so that she can enlist in his stead. Quickly learning of her departure, Mulan's grandmother prays to the family's ancestors for Mulan's safety. In the family's temple, the spirits of the ancestors are awakened by Mushu, a small red dragon who is a disgraced former family guardian. The Great Ancestor decides that the powerful stone dragon guardian should guide Mulan, and sends Mushu to wake him. After accidentally destroying the guardian's statue, Mushu decides to redeem himself to the ancestors by personally aiding Mulan. He is accompanied by Cri-Kee, a "lucky" cricket.

Reporting to the training camp, Mulan passes as a man named "Fa Ping", with Mushu providing encouragement and clumsy guidance throughout her deception. Under the command of Captain Li Shang, she and her fellow recruits—including three named Yao, Ling, and Chien-Po—gradually become trained soldiers. The Emperor's belligerent counsel, Chi-Fu, threatens to dissuade the Emperor from allowing Shang's men to fight. Mushu and Cri-Kee then write a fake letter from Shang's father, General Li, ordering Shang to follow the main imperial army into the mountains. The reinforcements set out and discover that the Huns have slaughtered Li and his troops.

As the soldiers march up a mountain pass, the Huns' ruthless leader Shan Yu leads an ambush to attack them. Mulan uses a Huolongchushui cannon to trigger an avalanche and bury the Huns, but is badly injured. Shang and the soldiers discover Mulan's true identity while her wound is bandaged. Instead of executing Mulan as the law requires, Shang spares her life, saying that a life for a life, and his debt is repaid, and expels her from the army before departing for the Imperial City to report the Huns' defeat. Mulan, however, later discovers Shan Yu and several of his warriors have survived. Mulan travels to the city to warn Shang just as the Huns seize the palace and take the Emperor hostage. In the ensuing fight, Shan Yu's men are quickly defeated and Mulan lures Shan Yu onto the roof, and ultimately pins him down with his own sword. Guided by Mulan, Mushu uses a giant skyrocket to propel Shan Yu into a fireworks launching tower, killing him.

The Emperor and the city's assembled inhabitants praise Mulan for having saved them, and they bow to her in honor. She accepts the Emperor's crest and Shan Yu's sword as gifts but declines his offer to join the royal council. Mulan returns home and presents these gifts to her father, but he ignores them, happy to have her back. While Mushu is reinstated as a Fa family guardian, Shang becomes enamored with Mulan and accepts her invitation to stay for dinner.

== Cast ==
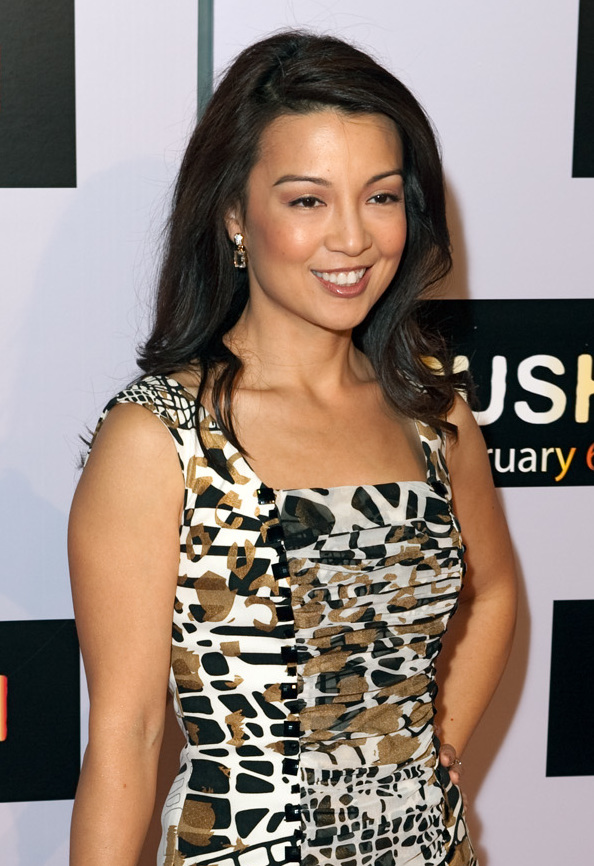
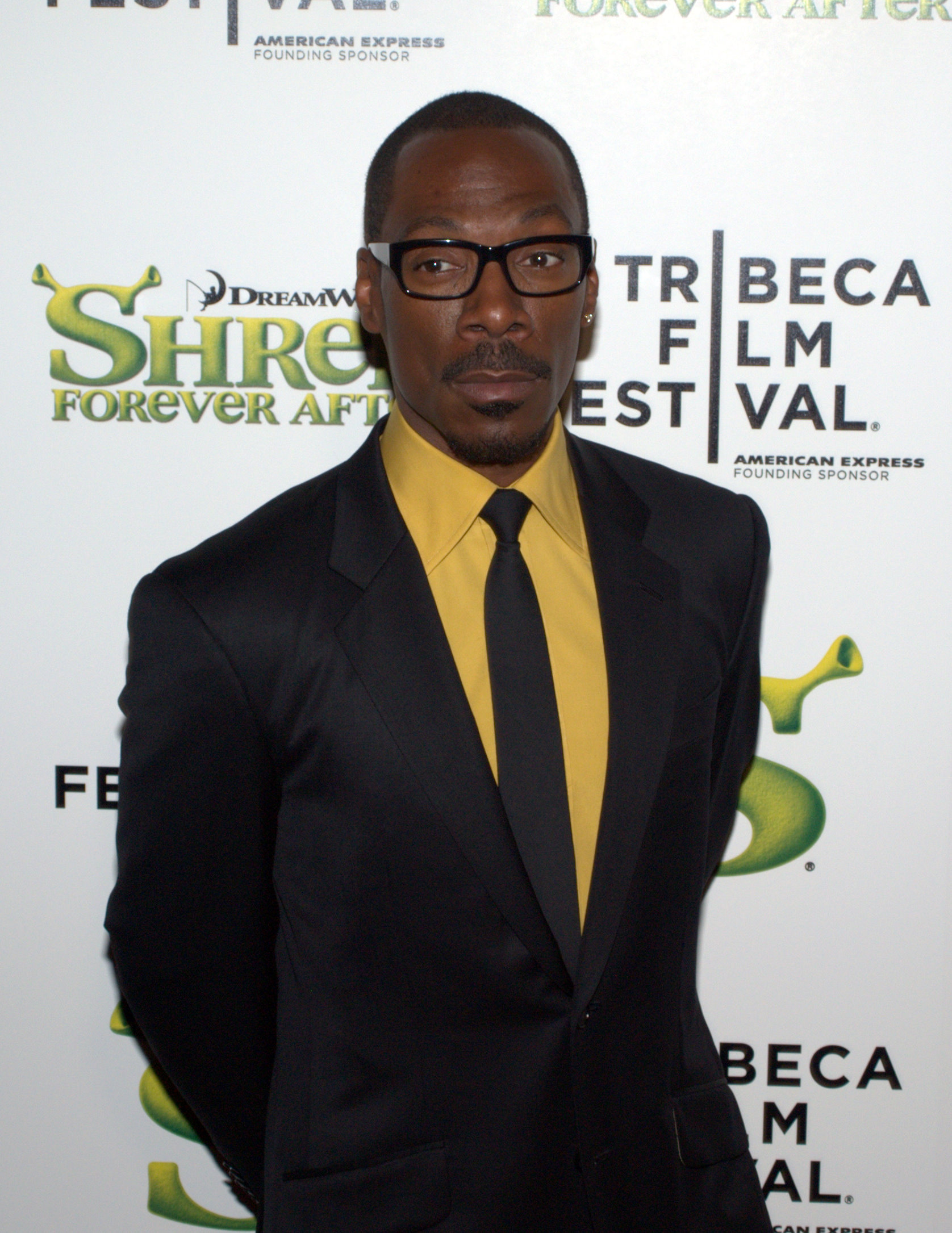
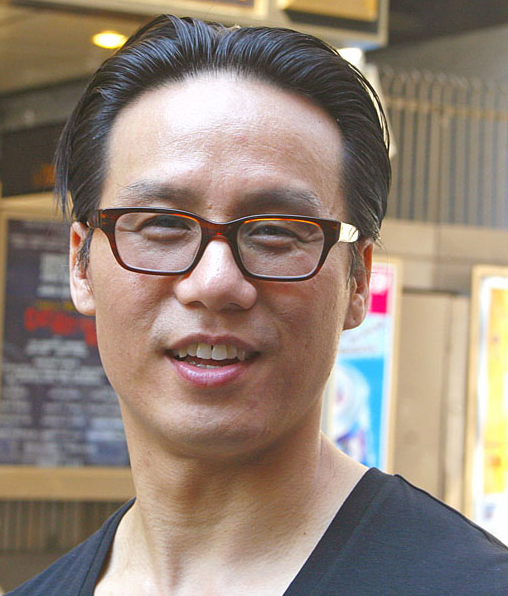
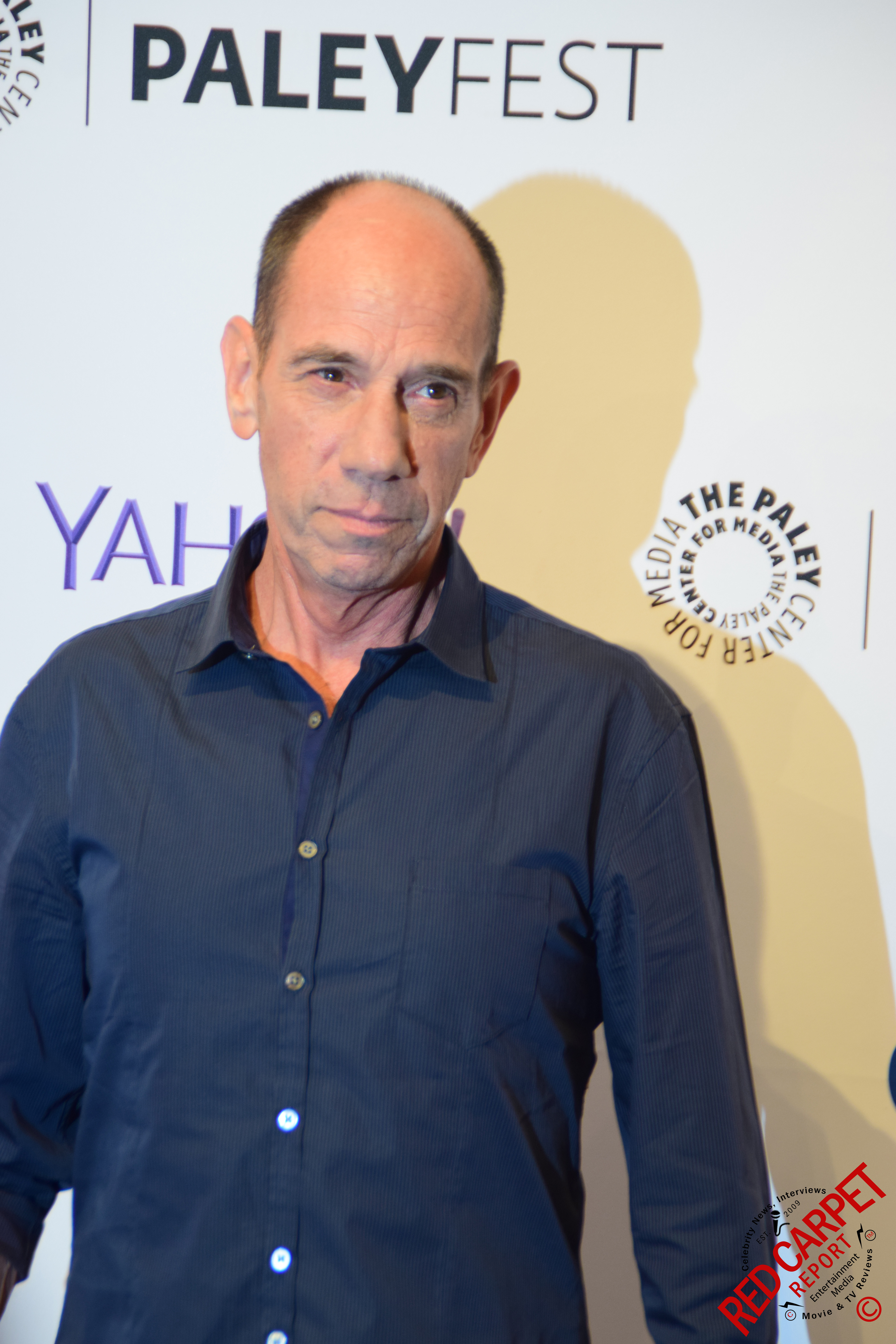
Top row (L–R): Ming-Na Wen, Eddie Murphy
Bottom row (L–R): BD Wong, Miguel Ferrer
- Ming-Na Wen as Mulan (singing voice provided by Lea Salonga)
- Eddie Murphy as Mushu
- BD Wong as Captain Li Shang (singing voice provided by Donny Osmond)
- Miguel Ferrer as Shan Yu, the Hun chieftain
- Harvey Fierstein as Yao
- Gedde Watanabe as Ling (singing voice provided by Matthew Wilder)
- Jerry Tondo as Chien-Po
- James Hong as Chi-Fu, an imperial mandarin
- Soon-tek Oh as Fa Zhou
- Freda Foh Shen as Fa Li
- June Foray as Grandmother Fa (singing voice provided by Marni Nixon)
- Frank Welker as Khan (Mulan's horse), Cri-Kee (Mulan's cricket), and Hun
- Miriam Margolyes as The Matchmaker
- James Shigeta as General Li
- George Takei as First Ancestor
- Pat Morita as The Emperor of China
- Mary Kay Bergman as various ancestors
- Barry Cook and Tony Bancroft as the fireworks palace attendants

Kelly Chen, Coco Lee and Xu Qing voiced Mulan in the Cantonese, Taiwanese Mandarin and Mainland standard versions of the film respectively, while Jackie Chan provided the voice of Li Shang in all three Chinese versions and appeared in the version of promotional music videos of "I'll Make a Man Out of You". Taiwanese comedian Jacky Wu provided the voice of Mushu in the Mandarin version.

== Production ==
=== Development ===
In 1989, Walt Disney Feature Animation Florida had opened with 40 to 50 employees, with its original purpose to produce cartoon shorts and featurettes. However, by late 1993, following several animation duties on Beauty and the Beast, Aladdin, and The Lion King, Disney executives were convinced to allow the Feature Animation Florida studios to produce their first independent film. Around that same time, Disney Feature Animation developed an interest in Asian-themed legends, beginning with the optioning of several books by children's book author Robert D. San Souci, who had a consulting relationship with Disney executive Jay Dyer. Also around that time, a short straight-to-video film titled China Doll about an oppressed and miserable Chinese girl who is whisked away by a British Prince Charming to happiness in the West was in development. Thomas Schumacher asked San Souci if he had any additional stories, in response to which San Souci turned in a manuscript of a book based on the Chinese poem "The Song of Fa Mu Lan". Ultimately, Disney decided to combine the two separate projects.

Following the opening of the Feature Animation Florida studios, Barry Cook, who had served as a special-effects animator since 1982, had directed the Roger Rabbit cartoon Trail Mix-Up produced at the satellite studio. At a lunch invitation with Thomas Schumacher, Cook was offered two projects in development: a Scottish folk tale with a dragon or Mulan. Knowledgeable about the existence of dragons in Chinese mythology, Cook suggested adding a dragon to Mulan, in which a week later, Schumacher urged Cook to drop the Scottish project and accept Mulan as his next project. Following this, Cook was immediately assigned as the initial director of the project, and cited influences from Charlie Chaplin and David Lean during production. While working as an animator on the gargoyles for The Hunchback of Notre Dame, Tony Bancroft was offered to co-direct the film following a recommendation from Rob Minkoff, co-director of The Lion King, to Schumacher, in which he accepted. He joined the creative team by early 1995.

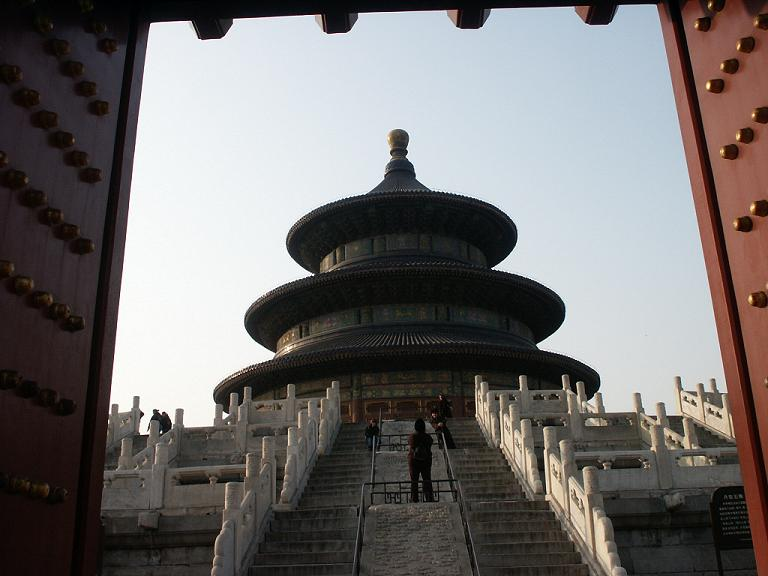
The crew toured various parts of China for inspiration.

In the summer of 1994, the production team sent a select group of artistic supervisors to China for three weeks to take photographs and drawings of local landmarks for inspiration; and to soak up local culture. Key members of the creative team at the time—producer Pam Coats, director Barry Cook, art director Ric Sluiter, layout supervisor Robert Walker, and Mulan's supervising animator Mark Henn—were invited to travel to China as a research trip to study the landscape, people, and history of the original legend. From June 17 to July 2, 1994, the research trip flew to Beijing, China, which is where Coats became inspired by the placement of flags on the Great Wall. They also toured Datong, Luoyang, Xi'an, Jiayuguan, Dunhuang, and Guilin.

=== Writing ===
In its earliest stages, the story was originally conceived as a Tootsie-inspired romantic comedy film where Mulan, who was a misfit tomboy who loves her father, is betrothed to Shang, whom she has not met. On her betrothal day, her father Fa Zhou carves her destiny on a stone tablet in the family temple, which she shatters in anger, running away to forge her own destiny. In November 1993, Chris Sanders, who had just finished storyboard work on The Lion King, was hoping to work on The Hunchback of Notre Dame until Schumacher appointed him to work on Mulan instead. Acting as Head of Story, Sanders grew frustrated with the romantic comedy aspect of the story, and urged producer Pam Coats to be more faithful to the original legend by having Mulan leave home because of the love for her father. This convinced the filmmakers to decide to change Mulan's character in order to make her more appealing and selfless.

Sequence Six—in which Mulan takes her father's conscription order, cuts her long hair, and dons her father's armor—served as a pivotal moment in the evolution of Mulan's character. Director Barry Cook explained that the sequence initially started as a song storyboarded by Barry Johnson and redrawn by character designer Chen-Yi Chang. Following the story changes to have Mulan leave to save her father, the song was dropped. Storyboard artist and co-head of story Dean DeBlois was tasked to revise the sequence, and decided to board the sequence with "minimal dialogue". Assisted with an existing musical selection from another film score courtesy of Sanders, the sequence reel was screened for Peter Schneider and Thomas Schumacher, both of whom were impressed. DeBlois stated, "Sequence Six was the first sequence that got put into production, and it helped to establish our 'silent' approach." Additionally, General Li was not originally going to be related to Shang at all, but by changing the story, the filmmakers were able to mirror the stories of both Shang's and Mulan's love for their fathers. As a Christian, Bancroft declined to explore Buddhism within the film.

Because there was no dragon in the original legend, Mulan did not have animal companions; it was Roy E. Disney who suggested the character of Mushu. Veteran story artist Joe Grant created the cricket character, Cri-Kee, though animator Barry Temple admitted "the directors didn't want him in the movie, the story department didn't want him in the movie. The only people who truly wanted him in the movie were Michael Eisner and Joe Grant – and myself, because I was assigned the character. I would sit in meetings and they'd say, 'Well, where's the cricket during all this?' Somebody else would say, 'Oh, to hell with the cricket.' They felt Cri-Kee was a character who wasn't necessary to tell the story, which is true." Throughout development on the film, Grant would slip sketches of Cri-Kee under the directors' door.

=== Casting ===
Before production began, the production team sought out Chinese, Japanese, Filipino, or Korean vocal talents. Tia Carrere was an early candidate to voice the title character. However, Lea Salonga, who had been the singing voice of Princess Jasmine in Aladdin, was initially cast to provide both Mulan's speaking and singing voices, but the directors did not find her attempt at a deeper speaking voice when Mulan impersonated Ping convincing, so Ming-Na Wen was brought in to speak the role. Salonga returned to provide the singing voice. Wen herself landed the role after the filmmakers listened to her narration at the beginning of The Joy Luck Club. Coats reflected on her decision, stating, "When we heard Ming-Na doing that voice-over, we knew we had our Mulan. She has a very likable and lovely voice, and those are the qualities we were looking for."

For the role of Mushu, Disney was aiming for top Hollywood talent in the vein of Robin Williams' performance as the Genie in Aladdin. The filmmakers initially approached Joe Pesci and Richard Dreyfuss until Michael Eisner considered Eddie Murphy. After accepting the role, Murphy initially balked when he was asked to record at the Disney studios, but then asked to record the voice in his basement at his Bubble Hill mansion in Englewood, New Jersey.

For the speaking voice of Captain Li Shang, BD Wong was hired, although his singing voice, for the song "I'll Make a Man Out of You", was performed by Donny Osmond, who had previously auditioned to be the speaking voice of the title character in Hercules. Osmond's casting originated from a suggestion from the casting director, and throughout recording, Osmond studied Wong's dialogue tapes, and aimed to match his inflections and personality. Osmond commented that his sons decided that he had finally "made it" in show business when he was in a Disney film. Likewise for the role of Grandmother Fa, June Foray provided the speaking voice, and Marni Nixon supplied the singing voice.

Mimi Chan was chosen by Mark Henn as the model and martial arts video reference for Mulan. Character drawing sessions and live-action video reference shooting was done over the course of three years. Chan's cousin, George Kee, was chosen to play the part of Captain Shang Li. Together, they choreographed fight sequences for the film's song "I'll Make a Man Out of You" and the film's end finale.

=== Animation and design ===
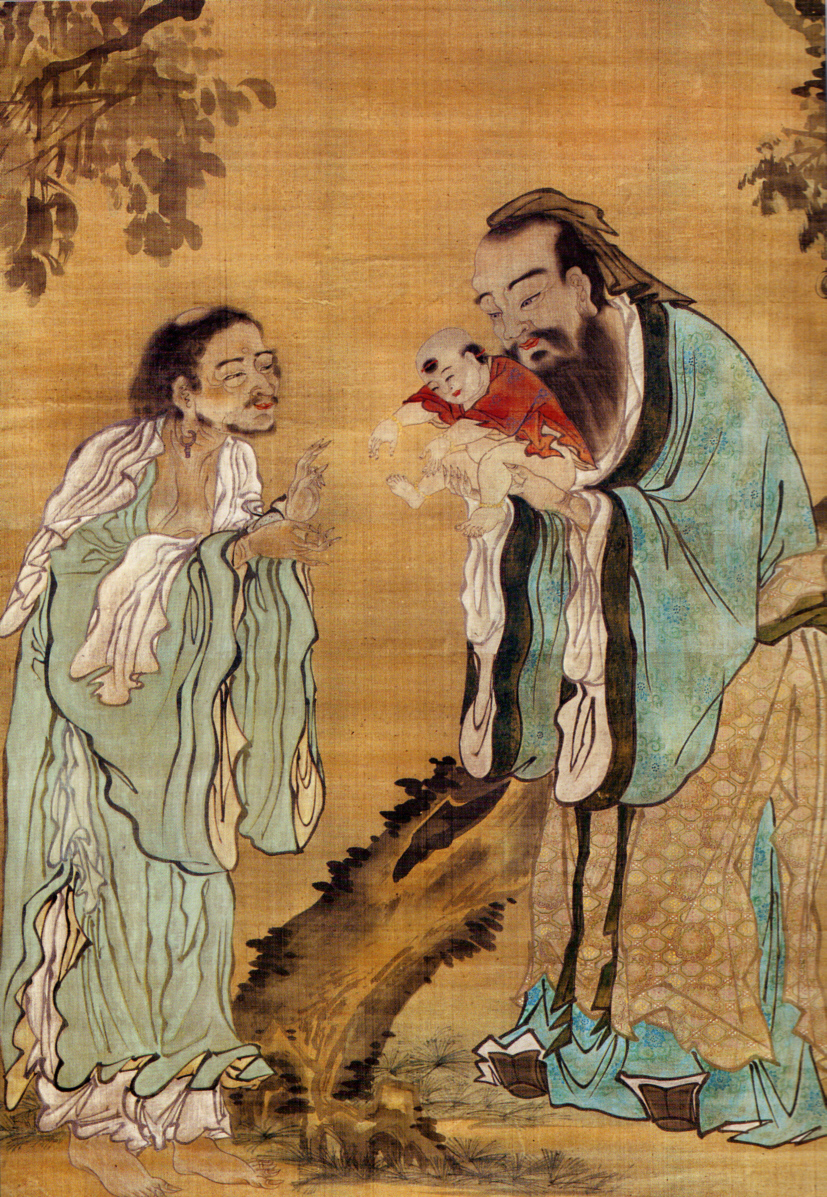
The animation crew was inspired by ancient Chinese art for the aesthetics of the movie

To achieve a harmonious visual look, producer designer Hans Bacher and art director Ric Sluiter, along with layout supervisor Robert Walker and background supervisor Robert Stanton collaborated to establish a proper chronological location for the film in Chinese history. Since there was no general consensus on the time of Mulan's existence, they based the visual design on the Ming and Qing dynasties. An important element of Bacher's design was to turn the art style closer to Chinese painting, with watercolor and simpler design, as opposed to the details of The Lion King and The Hunchback of Notre Dame. Bacher further studied more than thirty-five film directors ranging from the silent era German Expressionism, British and American epics of the 1950s and 60s, and the Spaghetti Westerns for inspiration for composition, lighting, and staging that would establish settings that enhanced the characters. Additional inspiration was found in the earlier Disney animated films such as Bambi, Pinocchio and Dumbo to establish a sense of staging.

In October 1997, the Walt Disney Company announced a major expansion of its Florida animation operations constructing a 200,000-square-foot, four-story animation building and the addition of 400 animators to the workforce.

To create 2,000 Hun soldiers during the Huns' attack sequence, the production team developed crowd simulation software called Attila. This software allows thousands of unique characters to move autonomously. A variant of the program called Dynasty was used in the final battle sequence to create a crowd of 3,000 in the Forbidden City. Pixar's photorealistic open API RenderMan was used to render the crowd. Another software developed for this movie was Faux Plane, which was used to add depth to flat two-dimensional painting. Although developed late in production progress, Faux Plane was used in five shots, including the dramatic sequence which features the Great Wall of China, and the final battle sequence when Mulan runs to the Forbidden City. During the scene in which the citizens of China are bowing to Mulan, the crowd is a panoramic film of real people bowing. It was edited into the animated foreground of the scene.

== Music ==
The songs featured in the film were written by composer Matthew Wilder and lyricist David Zippel. Stephen Schwartz was originally commissioned to write the songs for the film. Following the research trip to China in June 1994, Schwartz was contacted by former Disney studio chairman Jeffrey Katzenberg to compose songs for The Prince of Egypt, which he agreed. Peter Schneider, then-president of Walt Disney Feature Animation, threatened to have Schwartz's name removed from any publicity materials for Pocahontas and The Hunchback of Notre Dame. Michael Eisner phoned Schwartz, and urged him to back out of his commitment to DreamWorks, but he refused and left the project. After Schwartz's departure, his three songs, "Written in Stone", "Destiny", and "China Doll", were dropped amid story and character changes by 1995. Shortly after, Disney music executive Chris Montan heard Matthew Wilder's demo for a stage musical adaptation of Anne Rice's Cry to Heaven, and selected Wilder to replace Schwartz. In July 1997, David Zippel joined to write the lyrics. The film featured five songs composed by Wilder and Zippel, with a sixth originally planned for Mushu, but dropped following Eddie Murphy's involvement with the character.

Although Danny Elfman and Thomas Newman were considered to score the film, English composer Rachel Portman was selected as the film composer. However, Portman became pregnant during production, and decided to back out. Following Portman's departure, Randy Edelman—whose Dragonheart theme was used in the trailer—and Kitarō were considered, until Jerry Goldsmith became available and signed on after dropping out of a project. The film's soundtrack is credited for starting the career of pop singer Christina Aguilera, whose first song to be released in the U.S. was her rendition of "Reflection", the first single from the Mulan soundtrack. The song, and Aguilera's vocals, were so well received that it landed her a recording contract with RCA Records. In 1999, she would go on to release her self-titled debut album, on which "Reflection" was also included. The pop version of "Reflection" has a Polish version ("Lustro" performed by Edyta Górniak) and two Spanish versions, for Spain (performed by Malú) and Hispanic America (performed by Lucero). Other international versions include a Brazilian Portuguese version by Sandy & Junior ("Imagem"), a Korean version performed by Lena Park, and a Mandarin version by Coco Lee.

The music featured during the haircut scene, titled Mulan's Decision, is different in the soundtrack album. The soundtrack album uses an orchestrated score while the movie uses heavy synthesizer music. The synthesizer version is available on the limited edition CD. Salonga, who often sings movie music in her concerts, has done a Disney medley which climaxes with an expanded version of "Reflection" (not the same as those in Aguilera's version). Salonga also provided the singing voice for Mulan in the film's sequel, Mulan II.

== Release ==
=== Marketing ===
The film's teaser trailer was released in June 1997, attached to the theatrical releases of Hercules, The Little Mermaid and Flubber. Teaser spots were shown during CBS's coverage of the 1998 Winter Olympics.

Because of the disappointing box office performances of The Hunchback of Notre Dame and Hercules, Disney restricted its marketing campaign for Mulan, spending $30 million on promotional advertisements compared to more than $60 million for Hercules the year before. Rather than holding a lavish media event premiere like those of the past few years, such as premiering Pocahontas in Central Park and bringing the Main Street Electrical Parade to Fifth Avenue for Hercules, Disney opted to premiere the film on June 5, 1998, at the Hollywood Bowl, complete with Chinese lanterns and fortune cookies. Two days before the general release, McDonald's launched its promotional campaign by including one of eight toys free with the purchase of a Happy Meal. The promotion also included Szechuan sauce for its Chicken McNuggets, which would be referenced in a 2017 episode of the Adult Swim series Rick and Morty and subsequently brought back by McDonald's as a promotional item related to that show.

In collaboration with Disney, Hyperion Books published The Art of Mulan authored by Jeff Kurtti, which chronicled the production of the film. In addition with its publication, Hyperion Books also issued a collector's "folding, accordion book" of the ancient poem that inspired the film. On August 18, 1998, around 3,700 backpacks and 1,800 pieces of luggage were recalled to their manufacturer, Pyramid Accessories Inc., when it was discovered they contained lead-based paint.

=== Home media ===
The film was first released on VHS on February 2, 1999, as part of the Walt Disney Masterpiece Collection lineup. Mulan was released on DVD on November 9, 1999, as a Walt Disney Limited Issue for a limited sixty-day time period before going into moratorium. On February 1, 2000, it was re-released on VHS and DVD as part of the Walt Disney Gold Classic Collection lineup. The VHS and DVD were accompanied by two music videos of "Reflection" and "True to Your Heart" while the DVD additionally contained the theatrical trailer and character artwork. The Gold Collection release was returned into the Disney Vault on January 31, 2002. On October 26, 2004, Walt Disney Home Entertainment re-released a restored print of Mulan on VHS and as a 2-disc Special Edition DVD.

In March 2013, Walt Disney Studios Home Entertainment released Mulan and Mulan II on Blu-ray and DVD to coincide with the film's 15th anniversary.

In September 2017, Mulan became available to Netflix users through their streaming service. In November 2019, Mulan became available for streaming on Disney+. A year later, Mulan was released on 4K Blu-ray.

== Reception ==
=== Box office ===
Mulan grossed $22.8 million in its opening weekend, ranking second behind The X-Files. For its second weekend, it remained in the number two spot behind another Eddie Murphy film, Dr. Dolittle, collecting $17 million and outgrossing fourth place newcomer Out of Sight. It went on to gross $120 million in the United States and Canada combined, and $304 million worldwide, making it the second-highest grossing family film of the year, behind A Bug's Life, and the seventh-highest-grossing film of the year overall. While Mulan domestically out-grossed the two Disney animated films which had preceded it, The Hunchback of Notre Dame and Hercules, its box office returns failed to match those of the Disney films from the first half of the Renaissance such as Beauty and the Beast, Aladdin, and The Lion King. Internationally, its highest grossing releases included those in the United Kingdom ($14.6 million) and France ($10.2 million).

=== Critical reception ===
Upon release, Mulan received mostly positive reviews from film critics, who praised it for exploring themes such as strength, feminism, and gender roles. On the review aggregator website Rotten Tomatoes, 91% of 141 critics' reviews are positive, with an average rating of 8.3/10. The website's consensus reads: "Exploring themes of family duty and honor, Mulan breaks new ground as a Disney film, while still bringing vibrant animation and sprightly characters to the screen." In a 2009 countdown, Rotten Tomatoes ranked it seventeenth out of the fifty canonical animated Disney features. On Metacritic, the film has a score of 72 out of 100, based on 24 critics, indicating "generally favorable" reviews. Audiences polled by CinemaScore gave the film a rare "A+" grade.

Roger Ebert, reviewing for the Chicago Sun-Times, gave Mulan three-and-a-half stars out of four in his written review. He said that "Mulan is an impressive achievement, with a story and treatment ranking with Beauty and the Beast and The Lion King". Likewise, James Berardinelli of ReelViews awarded the film three-and-a-half stars out of four praising the lead character, its theme of war, and the animation. He concluded that "Adults will appreciate the depth of characterization while kids will love Mulan's sidekick, a colorful dragon named Mushu. Everyone will be entertained [by] the fast-moving plot and rich animation." Todd McCarthy of Variety called the film "a female empowerment story par excellence, as well as a G-rated picture that may have strong appeal for many adults." McCarthy further praised the voice cast and background design, but overall felt the film "goes about halfway toward setting new boundaries for Disney's, and the industry's, animated features, but doesn't go far enough." Owen Gleiberman of Entertainment Weekly graded the film a B+ writing, "Vividly animated, with a bursting palette that evokes both the wintry grandeur and decorative splendor of ancient China, Mulan is artful and satisfying in a slightly remote way."

Gene Siskel of the Chicago Tribune described the film as "a big disappointment when compared with the studio's other recent films about a female hero searching for independence." He was further critical of Mulan's characterization in comparison to Ariel and Belle, and claimed the "design of the film does not take advantage of the inspiration provided by classic Chinese artists, and the songs are not memorable." Similarly, Janet Maslin of The New York Times criticized the lack of detail in the background art and described it as "the most inert and formulaic of recent Disney animated films." Reviewing the film for the Los Angeles Times, Kenneth Turan wrote "Mulan has its accomplishments, but unlike the best of Disney's output, it comes off as more manufactured than magical." While he praised the title character, he highlighted that the "by-now-standard hip patter (prepare for jokes about cross-dressing) is so tepid that not even five credited writers can revive it, and the songs by Matthew Wilder and David Zippel (with Lea Salonga and Donny Osmond singing for the leads) lack the spark that Zippel's lyrics brought to the underappreciated Hercules." Ed Gonzalez of Slant Magazine criticized the film as "soulless" in its portrayal of East Asian society.

This movie was also the subject of comment from feminist critics. Mimi Nguyen says the film "pokes fun at the ultimately repressive gender roles that seek to make Mulan a domesticated creature". Pam Coats, the producer of Mulan, said that the film aims to present a character who exhibits both masculine and feminine influences, being both physically and mentally strong.

==== China ====
Disney was keen to promote Mulan in China, hoping to replicate their success with the 1994 film The Lion King, which was one of the country's highest-grossing Western films at that time. Disney also hoped it might smooth over relations with the Chinese government which had soured after the release of Kundun, a Disney-funded biography of the Dalai Lama that the Chinese government considered politically provocative. China had threatened to curtail business negotiations with Disney over that film and, as the government only accepted ten foreign films to be shown in China each year, Mulan's chances of being accepted were low. Finally, after a year's delay, the Chinese government did allow the film a limited Chinese release, but only after the Chinese New Year, so as to ensure that local films dominated the more lucrative holiday market. Publications have reported that critical and audience reception in China was negative overall, who accused Disney of westernizing the tale. Box office income was low, due to both the unfavorable release date and rampant piracy. Chinese people also complained about Mulan's depiction as too foreign-looking and the story as too different from the myths.

=== Accolades ===
List of awards and nominations
Award	Category	Nominee(s)	Result	Ref.
Academy Awards	Best Original Musical or Comedy Score	Music by Matthew Wilder; Lyrics by David Zippel; Orchestral Score by Jerry Goldsmith	Nominated	
ALMA Awards	Outstanding Performance of a Song for a Feature Film	Christina Aguilera – "Reflection"	Nominated	
Annie Awards	Outstanding Achievement in an Animated Theatrical Feature		Won	
Annie Awards	Outstanding Individual Achievement for Directing in an Animated Feature Production	Barry Cook and Tony Bancroft	Won	
Annie Awards	Outstanding Individual Achievement for Producing in an Animated Feature Production	Pam Coats	Won	
Annie Awards	Outstanding Individual Achievement for Writing in an Animated Feature Production	Rita Hsiao, Chris Sanders, Philip LaZebnik, Raymond Singer, and Eugenia Bostwick-Singer	Won	
Annie Awards	Outstanding Individual Achievement for Character Animation	Ruben Aquino (for Shang)	Won	
Annie Awards	Outstanding Individual Achievement for Character Animation	Tom Bancroft (for Mushu)	Nominated	
Annie Awards	Outstanding Individual Achievement for Character Animation	Mark Henn (for Mulan)	Nominated	
Annie Awards	Outstanding Individual Achievement for Effects Animation	David Tidgwell	Won	
Annie Awards	Outstanding Individual Achievement for Music in an Animated Feature Production	Songs by Matthew Wilder and David Zippel; Score by Jerry Goldsmith	Won	
Annie Awards	Outstanding Individual Achievement for Production Design in an Animated Feature; Production	Hans Bacher	Won	
Annie Awards	Outstanding Individual Achievement for Storyboarding in an Animated Feature Production	Chris Sanders	Won	
Annie Awards	Outstanding Individual Achievement for Voice Acting by a Female Performer in an Animated Feature Production	Ming-Na Wen	Won	
Artios Awards	Animated Voice-Over Feature Casting	Ruth Lambert	Nominated	
ASCAP Film and Television Music Awards	Top Box Office Films	Matthew Wilder	Won	
Blockbuster Entertainment Awards	Favorite Animated Family Movie		Nominated	
BMI Film & TV Awards	Film Music Award	Jerry Goldsmith	Won	
Florida Film Critics Circle Awards	Special Notice to 1998 animation features		Won (Note: Tied with Antz, A Bug's Life, and The Prince of Egypt)	
Golden Globe Awards	Best Original Score – Motion Picture	Jerry Goldsmith	Nominated	
Golden Globe Awards	Best Original Song – Motion Picture	"Reflection"; Music by Matthew Wilder; Lyrics by David Zippel	Nominated	
Golden Reel Awards	Best Sound Editing – Animated Feature		Nominated	
Golden Reel Awards	Best Sound Editing – Music – Animated Feature	Kenneth Hall, Kathleen Fogarty-Bennett, Tom Kramer, and Robert Bayless	Nominated	
Golden Screen Awards			Won	
Grammy Awards	Best Spoken Word Album for Children	Disney's Mulan Read & Sing Along – June Foray	Nominated	
Grammy Awards	Best Song Written for a Motion Picture, Television or Other Visual Media	"True to Your Heart" – Matthew Wilder and David Zippel	Nominated	
International Film Music Critics Association Awards	Film Score of the Year	Jerry Goldsmith	Won	
International Film Music Critics Association Awards	Best Original Score for an Adventure Film	Jerry Goldsmith	Nominated	
Online Film & Television Association Awards	Best Family Picture	Pam Coats	Nominated	
Online Film & Television Association Awards	Best Family Actor	Eddie Murphy	Nominated	
Online Film & Television Association Awards	Best Family Actress	Ming-Na Wen	Won	
Online Film & Television Association Awards	Best Voice-Over Performance	Ming-Na Wen	Nominated	
Online Film & Television Association Awards	Best Family Score	Jerry Goldsmith, Matthew Wilder, and David Zippel	Nominated	
Online Film & Television Association Awards	Best Original Song	"Reflection"; Music by Matthew Wilder; Lyrics by David Zippel	Nominated	
Online Film & Television Association Awards	Best Family Ensemble		Nominated	
Satellite Awards (1998)	Best Animated or Mixed Media Feature		Nominated	
Satellite Awards (2004)	Outstanding Youth DVD		Nominated	
Young Artist Awards	Best Family Feature Film – Animated		Nominated	

- In 2008, the film was one of 50 nominees listed on the ballot for the American Film Institute's top 10 greatest American animated movies.

== Legacy ==
The World History Encyclopedia has credited the film with introducing the Mulan legend to a wider audience, in turn inspiring greater interest in Chinese history and literature.

=== Video game ===
A Windows, Macintosh, and PlayStation point-and-click adventure interactive storybook based on the film, Disney's Animated Storybook: Mulan (titled Disney's Story Studio: Mulan on PlayStation), was released on December 15, 1999. The game was developed by Media Station for computers and Revolution Software (under the name "Kids Revolution") for PlayStation. The game was met with generally positive reception and holds a 70.67% average rating at the review aggregator website GameRankings.

=== Live-action adaptation ===
Walt Disney Pictures first expressed interest in a live-action adaptation of Mulan in the 2000s. Zhang Ziyi was to star in it and Chuck Russell was chosen as the director. The film was originally planned to start filming in October 2010, but was eventually canceled.

In 2015, Disney again began developing a live-action remake. Elizabeth Martin and Lauren Hynek's script treatment reportedly featured a white merchant who falls in love with Mulan, and is drawn into a central role in the country's conflict with the Huns. According to a Vanity Fair source, the spec script was only a "jumping-off point" and all main characters would in fact be Chinese. Dawn of the Planet of the Apes and Jurassic World screenwriters Rick Jaffa and Amanda Silver are to rewrite Hynek and Martin's screenplay with Chris Bender, J. C. Spink and Jason Reed producing. In February 2017, it was announced that Niki Caro would direct the live-action adaptation of the 1998 animated film.

The casting process of a Chinese actress to portray the heroine began in October 2016. The film was originally scheduled to be released on November 2, 2018, but it was later taken off the release schedule with The Nutcracker and the Four Realms taking its old slot. On November 29, 2017, Liu Yifei was cast as the titular character. The film had its Hollywood premiere on March 9, 2020. Disney originally scheduled the film to be released in theaters on March 27, 2020; however, this was pushed back to July 24, and then August 21. The film's theatrical release was canceled in the United States and would instead have its premiere for a premium fee on Disney+ on September 4, 2020, but was still released theatrically in countries where theaters have re-opened, such as China, as well as in other countries that do not have Disney+.

Donnie Yen was cast as Commander Tung, a mentor and teacher to Mulan. Following him, Jet Li joined the film as the emperor of China, Gong Li was cast as the villain, a witch, and Xana Tang was announced to play Mulan's sister. The next month, Utkarsh Ambudkar was cast as Skatch, a con artist, and Ron Yuan was cast as Sergeant Qiang, the second in command of the Imperial Regiment. In June, Yoson An was cast as Chen Honghui, "a confident and ambitious recruit" who becomes Mulan's love interest. In July, Jason Scott Lee joined the cast as Bori Khan, a secondary villain and warrior seeking revenge. In August 2018, Tzi Ma, Rosalind Chao, Cheng Pei-Pei, Nelson Lee, Jimmy Wong and Doua Moua were added to the cast.

=== References in Disney media ===
Although Mulan isn't royalty by either birth or marriage (her husband is merely a high-ranking military officer), she is part of the Disney Princess media franchise. Mulan was the last addition to the lineup until Princess Tiana from The Princess and the Frog was added in 2009, 11 years later. In the film Lilo & Stitch, Nani has a poster of Mulan in her room. Mulan is also present in the Disney and Square Enix video game series Kingdom Hearts. In the first Kingdom Hearts and in Kingdom Hearts: Chain of Memories, Mushu is a summonable character, and in Kingdom Hearts II, the movie is featured as a playable world named "The Land of Dragons", with the cast of the film reprising their roles (excluding Shan-Yu, now voiced by Corey Burton). In the first chapter of the game, the film's plot is changed to accommodate the game's characters (Sora, Donald and Goofy) and Mulan (both as herself and as "Ping") able to join the player's party as a skilled sword fighter, while the second chapter covers Organization XIII member Xigbar as a spy in black and Mulan's determination to stop him with Sora's help. The Land of Dragons is the first Disney-based world Sora must visit in his journey. Actress Jamie Chung plays a live-action version of Mulan in the second, third, and fifth seasons of the ABC television series Once Upon a Time. The video game Disney Magic Kingdoms includes some characters of the film and some attractions based on locations of the film as content to unlock for a limited time.

== See also ==
- Han dynasty (the historical period on which this film is loosely based)
- Han–Xiongnu War (the historical conflict on which this film is loosely based)
- List of Disney animated features
- List of Disney animated films based on fairy tales
- List of animated feature-length films
- List of traditional animated feature films

== Bibliography ==
- Kurtti, Jeff (1998). The Art of Mulan. Hyperion Books. ISBN 0-7868-6388-9.
- Schroeder, Russell (1998). Mulan: Special Collector's Edition. Disney Press. ISBN 0-7868-3173-1.
