= Bunyan and Babe =

- Theatrical release poster
- Directed by: Louis Ross
- Written by: Michael A. Nickles; Julia Wall
- Produced by: John D. Eraklis
- Starring: John Goodman; Jeff Foxworthy; Kelsey Grammer; Johnny Orlando; Mark Hamill; Dorien Davies
- Edited by: Jay Shindell
- Music by: Zoë Poledouris; Angel Roché Jr.
- Production companies: Exodus Film Group; Toonz Entertainment
- Distributed by: Cinedigm (North America)
- Release date: January 12, 2017 (United States)
- Running time: 84 minutes
- Country: United States
- Language: English

Bunyan and Babe is a 2017 American animated adventure comedy film directed by Louis Ross, featuring the voices of John Goodman as Paul Bunyan and Jeff Foxworthy as Babe the Blue Ox. Loosely based on the folklore of Paul Bunyan, the film is about two children exiled on their grandfather's farm in Minnesota who discover a lair where Paul Bunyan and Babe the Blue Ox have resided since their disappearance from the Dead Forest. The story sees Bunyan and Babe teaming with the two kids to stop an evil land developer from destroying a town.

The film premiered online on Google Play, where it was made available to watch for free until February 16, 2017. It was then released theatrically in 12 American markets on February 3, 2017.

== Plot ==
Twelve-year-old Travis Barclay and his little sister Whitney are sent begrudgingly on a summer trip to visit their grandparents' farm in Delbert County. A greedy land developer, Norm Blandsford, has been buying up the little country town, running the hard-working residents off their land. After Travis has a run-in with one of Blandsford's men, he is chased into the forest where he stumbles upon a magic portal to the hidden world where Paul Bunyan lives. Paul has been in self-imposed exile for 100 years, ever since the advent of machines made his role in society obsolete and left him feeling of little value to the new world. Paul, reluctantly, escorts Travis back to the farm. But upon returning, Paul witnesses Blandsford's sinister plan. Bunyan and Babe the blue ox, together with the help of their new friends, Travis and Whitney, save the town.

== Cast ==
- Johnny Orlando as Travis
- John Goodman as Paul Bunyan
- Jeff Foxworthy as Babe the Blue Ox
- Kelsey Grammer as Norm Blandsford and The Amazing Blackstone Barclay
- Lola Wayne Villa as Whitney
- Mark Hamill as Grandpa
- Dorien Davies as Iris Ingram
- Kay Cole as Grandma / Mom / Tourist Mom
- Peter Chew as Sheriff Chambers
- Jeremy Guskin as Gustav
- Dawnn Lewis as Maybelle Mundy
- Tom Lowell as County Fair MC
- John D. Eraklis as Newscaster / Tourist Dad
- Sandy Stone as Gas Station Attendant
- Robin Howard as Tourist Kid #1
- Sophia Eraklis as Tourist Kid #2

== Production ==
Announced over ten years before its release, the film was planned to be a live-action/CG animation hybrid, with Jim Rygiel set to direct it. In May 2008, it was reported that Tony Bancroft would co-direct the film with Rygiel. Bancroft then worked some time on pre-production and, by 2014, he was attached as the only director, but he later left the project.

Sparx Animation Studios, following its previous collaboration with Exodus Film Group on the 2008 animated film, Igor, was hired to provide writing and special effects such as modeling, rigging, animation and texture. The character design would be handled in the United States, due to Exodus' preference of an American look. The animation at Sparx was set to begin in July 2008. As of November 2008, when Sparx closed its animation studio in Paris due to the 2008 financial crisis, the studio was no longer involved in the film.

On November 3, 2010, Metro-Goldwyn-Mayer filed for Chapter 11 Bankruptcy, and Bunyan and Babe would be another of MGM's last pre-Spyglass films to be released soon. In December 2010, MGM emerged from Chapter 11 bankruptcy.

In May 2014, Cinedigm picked up North American rights to the film.

== Reception ==
Common Sense Media rated the film a 3 out of 5 stars, stating "Bunyan and Babe is an animated feature film that finds a modern-day young brother and sister connecting with the American folkloric lumberjack Paul Bunyan and Babe, his blue ox. The two partnerships team up to help save a Minnesota town that is being taken over by an evil land developer (a comic but stereotyped businessman villain). The kids and the ox face assorted perils (chases, careening cars, falls, captures, a tranquilizing dart gun, fire), but there are no injuries or deaths. A few insults are delivered ("nincompoop," "nerdface," "ass") and expect some mild potty language ("poop," "puke"). It's OK for kids who are comfortable with real vs. pretend violence."
