= Star Wars Launch Bay =

Attraction at Disney Parks, 2015–2025

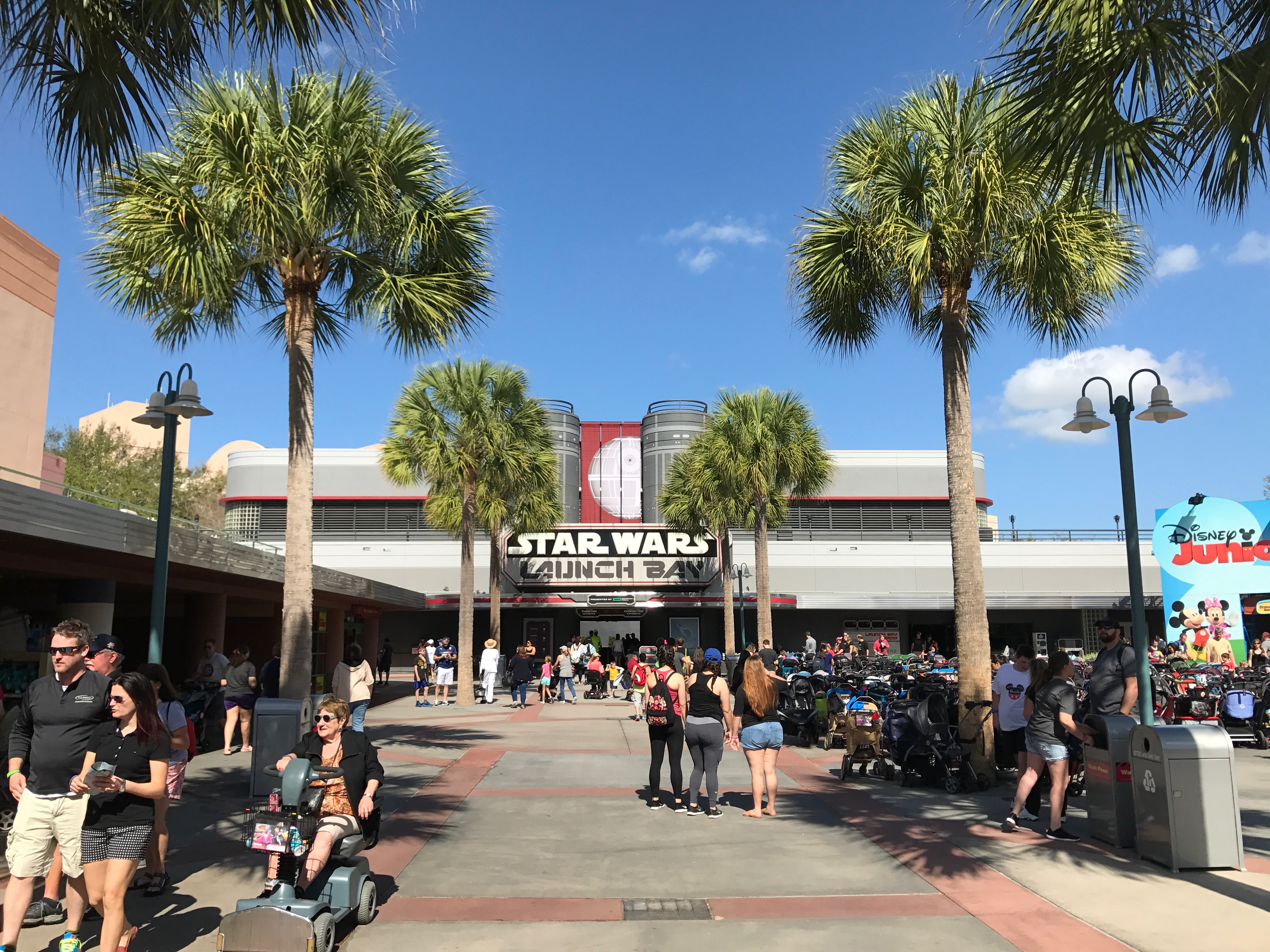
- Star Wars Launch Bay at Disney's Hollywood Studios

Disneyland
- Area: Tomorrowland
- Coordinates: 33.8118139°N 117.9166921°W
- Status: Closed
- Opening date: November 16, 2015
- Closing date: March 14, 2020
- Replaced: Innoventions

Disney's Hollywood Studios
- Area: Animation Courtyard
- Coordinates: 28.357958°N 81.561048°W
- Status: Closed
- Opening date: December 4, 2015
- Closing date: September 25, 2025
- Replaced: The Magic of Disney Animation
- Replaced by: The Magic of Disney Animation (The Walt Disney Studios)

Shanghai Disneyland Park
- Name: Star Wars Launch Bay 星球大战远征基地
- Area: Tomorrowland
- Status: Closed
- Soft opening date: May 7, 2016
- Opening date: June 16, 2016
- Closing date: June 2019
- Replaced by: Tomorrowland Pavilion featuring Avatar: Explore Pandora

Ride statistics
- Attraction type: Walk-through
- Designer: Walt Disney Imagineering
- Theme: Star Wars
- Sponsor: Hewlett Packard Enterprise
- Wheelchair accessible
- Assistive listening available
- Closed captioning available

Star Wars Launch Bay was an interactive walkthrough attraction based on the Star Wars franchise at Disney's Hollywood Studios at Walt Disney World Resort, Shanghai Disneyland and Disneyland at Disneyland Resort.

== History ==
The attraction for Disneyland and Disney's Hollywood Studios was announced at D23 Expo 2015 on August 15, 2015 at the Disney Parks Presentation along with Star Wars: Galaxy's Edge has two attractions, Millennium Falcon: Smugglers Run and Star Wars: Rise of the Resistance, the Season of the Force events at each park and an updated scene for Star Tours – The Adventures Continue. The attraction opened at each park at the start of their respective Season of the Force events, which was November 16, 2015 for Disneyland and December 1, 2015 at Disney's Hollywood Studios. The Orlando version was temporarily closed on March 16, 2020 (until July 17, 2022) and the building was used as a "Relaxation Station" to allow guests to safely remove facial coverings while remaining physically distanced, while the California version was temporarily closed on March 14, 2020 due to the park closure caused by the COVID-19 pandemic and two stay-at-home orders issued by California Governor Gavin Newsom; it reopened at some point prior to May 2025 for character meet-and-greet sessions. The Shanghai Version opened on June 16, 2016 and closed June 2019 in Tomorrowland Pavilion.

On July 22, 2025, it was announced that the Disney's Hollywood Studios incarnation, and Animation Courtyard area will close at a date to be announced and reopen in 2026 as a reimagined version of The Magic of Disney Animation as a new renovations in a new land, The Walt Disney Studios Lot.
