= Circle Seven Animation =

Former division of Walt Disney Feature Animation

- Type: Division
- Industry: Entertainment
- Predecessor: Walt Disney Feature Animation Florida
- Founded: March 16, 2004; 22 years ago
- Founder: Michael Eisner
- Defunct: May 26, 2006; 20 years ago
- Fate: Closed, operations transferred to Walt Disney Feature Animation (now Walt Disney Animation Studios).
- Successor: Pixar
- Headquarters: Glendale, California, United States
- Key people: Andrew Millstein
- Production output: CGI animation; motion pictures
- Number of employees: 168 (2006)
- Parent: Walt Disney Feature Animation

Circle Seven Animation (or Disney Circle Seven Animation) was a division of Walt Disney Feature Animation specializing in computer-generated imagery (CGI) animation and was originally intended to create sequels to the Disney-owned Pixar properties, leading rivals and animators to derisively nickname the division "Pixaren't". The studio did not release any films during its existence, nor were any of its scripts used by Pixar.

The division was named after the street where its studio was located, Circle Seven Drive in Glendale, California, which is also home to KABC-TV.

Due to Disney's purchase of Pixar in January 2006, on May 26 of the same year, Disney shut down Circle Seven Animation, and transferred about 136 out of the studio's 168 employees to Walt Disney Feature Animation, which was renamed Walt Disney Animation Studios in 2007, and the planned Pixar sequels (which included Monsters Inc. 2: Lost in Scaradise, Finding Nemo 2, and a version of Toy Story 3) were cancelled following Circle Seven's closure.

== Background ==
Pixar and Disney originally had a seven-film distribution agreement that gave Disney full ownership of Pixar's feature films and characters up to and including the film Cars, and the rights to make sequels. With the success of Toy Story 2 at the end of 1999, then-Disney CEO Michael Eisner and then-owner of Pixar Steve Jobs began to disagree on how Pixar should be run and the terms of a continued relationship.

Eisner claimed that Toy Story 2, as it was a sequel, did not count towards the "original" film count of the agreement, though Jobs disagreed.

Jobs announced in January 2004—after ten months of negotiations—that Pixar would not renew their agreement with Disney, and would seek out other distributors for releases starting in 2006. Jobs wanted Pixar to receive most of the profits that their films made (giving Disney the standard 10% distribution fee) as well as full ownership of any future films and characters that the studio would create after Cars (2006).

Eisner found these terms unacceptable. Pixar executive producer John Lasseter, who had personally directed Toy Story (1995), A Bug's Life (1998), and Toy Story 2 (1999), became distraught over the breakdown of the Disney-Pixar relationship, as he was worried about what Disney might do with the characters Pixar had created.

When he had to announce what had happened at a meeting of Pixar's 800 employees, Lasseter reportedly said, through tears, "It's like you have these dear children and you have to give them up to be adopted by convicted child molesters."

== Name ==
Circle 7 Animation was named after both the street it was located, and ABC's O&O logo it was named after.

Circle Seven Animation was named after the street where its studio was located, and the often-used Circle 7 logo, a television station logo in the United States designed in the early 1960s for ABC's five owned-and-operated stations, all of which broadcast on VHF channel 7.

== History ==
Earlier logo

In March 2004, Disney Circle Seven Animation was formed as a CGI animation studio to create sequels to the Disney-owned Pixar properties, and the studio began to hire staff shortly thereafter. It was seen as a bargaining chip by people within both Pixar and Disney, but also as a backup plan by Eisner in case negotiations fell through.

The projects that the studio worked on were early drafts of Toy Story 3, Monsters, Inc. 2: Lost in Scaradise, and Finding Nemo 2.

Bob Iger succeeded Eisner as the new CEO of Disney in 2005. While viewing a parade at Hong Kong Disneyland that fall, Iger felt that Disney needed Pixar because all of the characters less than ten years old in the parade were from Pixar's films. On January 24, 2006, Iger and Jobs agreed to a deal in which Disney would buy Pixar for $7.4 billion, with Pixar's leadership (Edwin Catmull and Lasseter) taking control of Disney's animation group. Under this new deal, Pixar would make Toy Story 3 with a new script; director Andrew Stanton stated that Pixar purposely avoided looking at Circle Seven's script.

On May 26, 2006, Disney shut down Circle Seven Animation, and transferred about 136 out of the studio's 168 employees to Walt Disney Feature Animation (renamed Walt Disney Animation Studios in 2007). Catmull later disclosed in his 2014 book Creativity, Inc. that although Pixar employees had been frustrated with Disney's decision to create Circle Seven Animation in order to create sequels to Pixar's own films, they did not hold that against Circle Seven's employees, who had no part in that decision. This was why Catmull and Lasseter were willing to absorb most of the Circle Seven workforce directly into Walt Disney Animation Studios. They eventually appointed Andrew Millstein, the former head of Circle Seven, as the general manager of Walt Disney Animation Studios to handle day-to-day business affairs on their behalf.
