= Pam Coats =

American animated film producer

- Born: Utah, U.S.
- Education: B.A. Fine Arts, Utah State University; M.A. Direction, University of Oregon
- Occupation: Animated film producer
- Years active: 1989–present
- Notable work: Mulan (1998); Scoob! (2020); Thelma the Unicorn (2024)

Pam Coats is an American film producer. In 1999, she became the senior vice president of creative development, the highest-ranking woman at Walt Disney Animation Studios, a position she held until 2004.

== Early life and education ==
Born in Utah, Pam Coats gained experience working in Utah theater, productions for the Church of Jesus Christ of Latter-day Saints (LDS Church), and at Utah State University. She received a degree in fine arts from Utah State University. She received a master's degree in directing from the University of Oregon.

== Career ==
Coats began working for Disney animation as a production assistant in 1989. She was assigned to the story department as a production assistant for the 1990 film The Rescuers Down Under. She produced the short films Trail Mix-Up, a Roger Rabbit short film, and Runaway Brain starring Mickey Mouse.

Coats is best known for producing the animated film Mulan (1998), her first full-length film. For her work on Mulan, she was awarded an Annie Award for Outstanding Individual Achievement for Producing in an Animated Feature Production.

In 1999 Coats was promoted to senior vice president of creative development, becoming the highest-ranking woman in the Walt Disney Animation Studios. As a Disney executive, she was involved in the English translation and adaptation of Hayao Miyazaki's Spirited Away. She maintained the position until 2004, when her contract was not renewed.

Following her departure from Disney, Coats worked for Miramax to facilitate between the animation and those with live-action experience for the 2011 film Gnomeo & Juliet. Coats produced Scoob!, a Warner Animation Group feature film released in 2020.
