= Animation Lab =

Animation studio

- Type: Private
- Industry: Animation
- Founded: 2006
- Defunct: 2013
- Headquarters: Jerusalem, Israel; Los Angeles, California, United States
- Products: Animated films

Animation Lab was an animation studio based in Jerusalem and Los Angeles.

Founded in 2006, and backed by Israeli Venture Capital firm Jerusalem Venture Partners (JVP), the studio was developing its first feature film, The Wild Bunch, as the first feature-length CGI animation film produced in Israel. The story was to involve genetically modified cornstalks trying to take over a meadow populated by common wildflowers. Philip LaZebnik was hired to write the screenplay, and Alexander Williams was slated to make his directorial debut.

Despite early promise and industry attention, Animation Lab ceased operations in 2013 before releasing a completed feature film.
