= My Last Day (film) =

- Anime release poster
- Directed by: Barry Cook; Studio 4°C
- Produced by: Barry Cook; Studio 4°C
- Production companies: Studio 4°C; The JESUS Film Project
- Distributed by: The Jesus Film Project; Campus Crusade for Christ
- Release date: April 12, 2011
- Running time: 9:14 minutes
- Countries: Japan; United States

My Last Day (Japanese: 私の最後の日, Hepburn: Watashi no Saigo no Hi) is a 2011 Christian anime short film created by The Jesus Film Project, with Barry Cook and STUDIO4°C. The story unfolds through the eyes of a criminal who receives the same crucifixion sentence as Jesus Christ. This is a short film of regret, repentance and redemption. The film is available in several different languages.

== Plot ==
A screenshot from the short film featuring Jesus in the Temple of Jerusalem

The film begins with a prisoner watching from the prison bars as Jesus gets flogged in Pilate's courtyard. He remembers Jesus' teaching about "giving to Caesar the things that are Caesar's and to God the things that are God's." and wonders why they are hurting an innocent man. Saddened, he remembers his own crime: he cornered a rich man in an alley and attempted to rob him. Holding him up with a knife, the thief tries to take a box of coins and belongings. The thief is nervous so when he tries to go after the man, he fumbles. The man fights him with the box, sending coins across the ground. The thief stabs the man in the struggle. He steals the coins and runs off. The flashback ends. He then breaks down in tears, aggrieved at seeing someone innocent suffer an even more brutal punishment as a criminal than himself.

Most people in the crowds in the courtyard scream for Jesus to be crucified. The thief, another man (who is also a thief) and Jesus are loaded with the beams for their crosses and march to Golgotha. As they make their way there, the thief looks curiously to the crowds, some of whom scream that Jesus is innocent.

They finally arrive at Golgotha and are removed of their robes. The centurion guards decide to play for Jesus'. Now topless, nails are driven through their wrists, painfully securing them to the patibulum. Each man is then hung on his cross due to a large, deep square-shaped groove carved into the stipes and their feet are nailed to a wooden sedile. They hang in agony. Like the crowd, the other thief demands that Jesus save Himself and them. But our thief rebukes the statement, claiming that they are receiving the same punishment that Jesus is, even though He has done no wrong. The thief then asks that Jesus remember him when he comes as king. Jesus tells him that today they will be in paradise together. A while later, a dark storm overwhelms the hill and, after commending his spirit to God, Jesus dies. A Roman soldier then pierces Jesus' side with his spear causing blood and water to erupt from the wound.

Afterwards, the thief has his ankles broken. He gasps in pain, after that he then hangs his head down and dies. He then sees a whole and undamaged and fully healed Jesus (who greets him by reciting John 11:25) in a beautiful place which is, just as Jesus promised, Paradise.

== Reception ==
Amanda Lago from GMA News Online of the Philippines gave the film a positive review, praising the animation and cinematography, stating there was "a tendency for tight shots—a zoom-in on the eyes of the characters to show pain and regret, and a close-up of a nail being pounded into flesh to highlight the sheer brutality of the crucifixion."
