= Barry Cook =

American film director

- Born: Nashville, Tennessee, U.S.
- Occupations: Film director; writer; effects animator
- Years active: 1978–present
- Known for: Mulan; Arthur Christmas; Walking with Dinosaurs

Barry Cook is an American film director who has worked in the animated film industry since the late 1970s. Cook and Tony Bancroft directed Mulan (1998), for which they won the 1998 Annie Award for Best Animated Feature. Cook was also the co-director for Arthur Christmas (2011), directed by Sarah Smith. Cook also directed Walking with Dinosaurs (2013) with Neil Nightingale.

== Background ==
Cook made his first film when he was ten years old. Cook interned as an assistant animator beginning in December 1978 at the animation studio Hanna-Barbera, where he contributed as an assistant animator on "The New Fred and Barney Show" and many others. He also contributed to the pilot episode of the 1981 TV series The Smurfs. In 1981, Disney hired Cook as an effects animator for Tron (1982). Cook subsequently animated or supervised effects for various films including The Little Mermaid (1989), Beauty and the Beast (1991), and Aladdin (1992). He became the supervisor for the special-effects animation department at Disney. In 1992, he directed the animated short film Off His Rockers, which was about a child and his rocking horse. Peter Schneider, then president of feature animation, saw potential in Cook's film and supported its production. Off His Rockers drew the attention of director Randal Kleiser, who requested for the short to open his feature film Honey, I Blew Up the Kid in 1992. In 1993, Cook directed another animated short, Trail Mix-Up, which featured the cartoon character Roger Rabbit. His directing experience with Off His Rockers and Trail Mix-Up led him to the opportunity to direct Mulan with Bancroft.

Following a five-month sabbatical break after directing Mulan, Cook began developing ideas for his second animated feature, and arrived at an idea he developed years earlier titled The Ghost & His Gift, adapted from Oscar Wilde's The Canterville Ghost. In 2000, Cook pitched his idea to Michael Eisner and Thomas Schumacher who agreed the idea showed potential, although Eisner deterred about the simplicity while Schumacher felt the project was "too human" and more appropriate for a live action film. Following the pitch, Cook began reconstructing the idea, and added seven folk art characters into the story. During another pitch for the revised film, Cook proposed producing the film with 70 percent computer animation and 30 percent traditional animation, in which My Peoples was green-lighted with a budget of $45 million. The project underwent a series of titles such as Angel and Her No Good Sister, Elgin's People, and Once in a Blue Moon before settling on A Few Good Ghosts, and included a voice cast of Dolly Parton, Lily Tomlin, Hal Holbrook, and Charles Durning. On November 14, 2003, David Stainton announced that production on A Few Good Ghosts was halted, and Disney announced the closure of the Feature Animation Florida studio on January 12, 2004. Following the closure, Cook was not offered a renewed contract with the Burbank-located animation studio, and worked consecutively with IDT Entertainment (now known as Starz Media), Animation Lab, and Laika on a series of undeveloped animation projects.

In February 2009, Cook signed with Aardman Animations, and the following April, he was announced to co-direct Arthur Christmas alongside Sarah Smith. Because Smith previously worked in live-action television, Cook described his involvement as "help[ing] along with the animation, from designing the film and its characters to all of the storyboarding process." In March 2010, Cook signed with Animal Logic to serve as co-director on Walking with Dinosaurs, intrigued with the idea of using computer animation against live-action backgrounds. Inspired by the original BBC documentary series, the movie was conceived as a silent movie with no dialogue, but following the screening of a rough cut, 20th Century Fox executives requested a celebrity voice cast, believing it would connect audiences to the characters. In 2011, Cook wrote the screenplay for The Jesus Film Project and Studio 4°C's short film, My Last Day.

In July 2016, it was announced that Cook was in negotiations to direct Mean Margaret for Astro-Nomical Entertainment.

== Filmography ==
| Year | Title | Credits |
|---|---|---|
| 1982 | Tron | Effects Animator |
| 1982 | Heidi's Song | Assistant Animator |
| 1985 | The Black Cauldron | Effects Animator |
| 1985 | My Science Project | Effects Animator |
| 1986 | Captain EO (Short) | Effects Animator |
| 1988 | Oliver & Company | Effects Animator |
| 1989 | The Little Mermaid | Effects Animator |
| 1990 | Roller Coaster Rabbit (Short) | Effects Animator |
| 1990 | The Rescuers Down Under | Effects Animator |
| 1991 | Beauty and the Beast | Visual Effects Supervisor: Florida |
| 1992 | Off His Rockers (Short) | Director / Story Development Artist |
| 1992 | Aladdin | Visual Effects Supervisor: Florida |
| 1993 | Trail Mix-Up (Short) | Director / Story |
| 1993 | Aladdin (Video Game) | Animation Director |
| 1998 | Mulan | Director with Tony Bancroft |
| 2011 | My Last Day (Short) | Director / Producer |
| 2011 | Arthur Christmas | Co-director |
| 2013 | Walking with Dinosaurs | Director with Neil Nightingale |
| 2018 | Blinker | Writer / Director |
| 2019 | Sideshow | Writer / Director |
| 2019 | Legion | Writer / Director |
| 2021 | Chosen Witness | Writer / Director |
