= Off His Rockers =

Disney's 1992 animated short film by Barry Cook

- Directed by: Barry Cook
- Story by: Barry Cook; Paul Steele; Peter Cook; Alex Kupershmidt
- Produced by: Tad Gielow
- Edited by: Chuck Williams
- Music by: Bruce Broughton
- Animation by: Tom Bancroft; Linda Bel; Paul McDonald
- Layouts by: Bob Walker; Davy Liu
- Backgrounds by: Kevin Turcotte; Robert Stanton
- Color process: Color
- Production companies: Walt Disney Feature Animation; Walt Disney Feature Animation Florida
- Distributed by: Buena Vista Pictures
- Release date: July 17, 1992; (with Honey, I Blew Up the Kid)
- Running time: 5 minutes

Off His Rockers is an animated short film produced by Walt Disney Feature Animation and released in 1992. It was released theatrically accompanying the film Honey, I Blew Up the Kid. It was the first Disney animated short film to use digital ink and paint via CAPS process. The short was included on the laserdisc release of Honey, I Blew Up the Kid.

== Plot ==
A boy plays a video game on a console, ignoring everything around him. His wooden horse, with which he used to play, tries to make him regain his desire to play with him by doing things such as a two-legged dance, but to no avail. The horse unintentionally unplugs the video game, so the boy angrily turns it back on. However, the boy sees a picture of him with the horse on the ground and regains his desire to play with him. Thus, the child plays cowboys with the horse, riding around the room with him.

== Credits ==
=== Staff ===
- Director: Barry Cook
- Producer: Tad Gielow
- Music: Bruce Broughton
- Film editor: Chuck Williams
- Art director: Ric Sluiter
- Supervising animators: Rob Bekuhrs, James R. Tooley, Alex Kupershmidt
- Animators: Tom Bancroft, Linda Bel, Paul McDonald
- Story development: Barry Cook, Paul Steele, Peter Cook, Alex Kupershmidt
- Visual development: Tony Bancroft, Rob Bekuhrs, Lou Dellarosa, Trey Finney, Levi Lewis, Steve Goldberg
- Layout sketch: Bob Walker, Davy Liu
- Background paintings: Kevin Turcotte, Robert Stanton
- Animation check: Laurie Sacks
- Animation camera: Mary E. Lescher, Gary W. Smith
- Digital film recording: Ariel Shaw, Christopher Gee, Chuck Warren, Christine Beck
- Florida Animation Studio Ink & Paint: Fran Kirsten, Pam Darley, Suzie Ewing, Mike Lusby, Monica Murdock, Lynn Rippberger, Joanne Tzuanos
- Digitizing camera: Robyn Roberts, Jo Ann Breuer, Karen China, Bob Cohen, Lynnette Cullen, Gareth Fishbaugh, Cindy Garcia, Kent Gordon, Gina Wootten
- Production management: Tim O'Donnell, David F. Wolf, Suzi Vissotzky
- Sound design: Drew Neumann
- CG production system coordinator: Don Gworek
- CG systems administration: Brad Lowman, Michael Bolds, Carlos Quinonez, Grace Shirado, Michael Sullivan, Mark M. Tokunaga
- Computer rendering on: Silicon Graphics Computer Systems
- Computer graphics software: Wavefront Technologies
- Special thanks: Wendy Aylsworth, Paul Curasi, Joe Jiuliano, Dan Philips, Maureen Donley
- Animation production services provided: Walt Disney Feature Animation Florida, Disney/MGM Studios, Lake Buena Vista, Florida

== Creation process ==
The film started as a side project of director Barry Cook, who, at the time, was working at Walt Disney Feature Animation Florida. Starting with a core of six people, the project ended up involving most of the Florida studio's staff of 73 (and some in California), all of whom "donated" their time to the project beyond their official duties.
