= Roger Rabbit short films =

Film series

The Roger Rabbit shorts are a series of three live-action/animated short films produced by Walt Disney Feature Animation from 1989 to 1993. They feature Roger Rabbit, the animated protagonist from Who Framed Roger Rabbit (1988), being enlisted to care for Baby Herman while his mother is absent, resulting in a plot defined by slapstick humor and visual gags. Each short concludes with a sequence involving live-action and animation, in which the characters interact with live-action human beings, akin to the 1988 film. The MGM character Droopy makes a cameo appearance in all three shorts.

Charles Fleischer, Kathleen Turner, Lou Hirsch, and April Winchell returned to reprise their voice roles from the film, alongside producers Steven Spielberg, Kathleen Kennedy, Frank Marshall, and Don Hahn. Marshall also directed the live-action segments in the first two shorts, while Industrial Light & Magic (ILM) was responsible for the live-action visual effects. Produced in association with Spielberg's Amblin Entertainment, the three shorts (Tummy Trouble, Roller Coaster Rabbit and Trail Mix-Up) were originally attached to the theatrical releases of several Disney and Amblin films. A fourth short, Hare in My Soup, was cancelled during pre-production, with three more (Clean and Oppressed, Beach Blanket Bay and Bronco Bustin' Bunny) in the planning stages also cancelled.

== Tummy Trouble ==
Tummy Trouble
- Directed by: Rob Minkoff; Frank Marshall (live-action sequence)
- Story by: Kevin Harkey; Bill Kopp; Rob Minkoff; Mark Kausler; Patrick A. Ventura
- Produced by: Don Hahn
- Music by: James Horner
- Production companies: Walt Disney Feature Animation; Amblin Entertainment
- Distributed by: Buena Vista Pictures Distribution (Note: Distributed by Buena Vista Pictures Distribution through the Walt Disney Pictures banner.)
- Release date: June 23, 1989 (Theatrical release with Honey, I Shrunk the Kids)
- Running time: 8 minutes

=== Plot ===
Roger is placed in charge of watching Baby Herman when his mother needs to step out for an hour; as soon as she leaves, Herman breaks into a heavy crying fit, which Roger doesn't seem to be able to break until he pulls out a bright shiny rattle, which immediately garners Herman's attention. After a brief second of shaking it, Herman swallows the rattle, prompting Roger to panic, call 911, and rush the baby to the emergency room. Roger is overcome with guilt when he visits, but quickly realizes Herman wants to drink from a milk bottle in the room; after Roger burps Herman, he hiccups the rattle, but finds that in Roger's joyous celebration, he accidentally swallows it, causing Baby Herman to become upset that he lost his toy. Roger begins to dance, his hips rattling to the toy, giving Baby Herman some amusement, but is stunned when a doctor bursts in, mistakes him for Baby Herman, and preps him for emergency surgery.

While Roger is gone, Herman spies Jessica (who is clad in a nurse's outfit) pushing a cart of milk bottles and gives chase, eventually following a runaway milk bottle into the emergency room, where Roger is strapped to the table while the surgeons have disappeared for a lunch break. Herman mistakes a large surgical laser for a bottle and climbs up onto it, nearly dissecting Roger in the process. The laser detaches itself from the ceiling and flings a table of scalpels and hypodermic needles at Roger, who avoids them but is electrocuted in the process. The laser flies around the room and lodges itself under Roger's stretcher and sends him and Herman both ejecting from the emergency room and causing Roger to gag up the rattle, and when Baby Herman to again swallow it before crashing into a wheelchair, they then fly down the hall and into an open elevator shaft due to wet floors causing the wheelchair they landed on to skid out of control. Baby Herman's diaper parachutes him safely to the floor, while Roger gets crushed by an elevator where Droopy is, while trying to catch Herman. Eventually, they end up in a room with piles of gas pumps, which ignite and send them, the pair, launching miles into the air. As they fall, Herman coughs up the rattle, and Roger swallows it again. As they crash back into the hospital, Roger crashes through several floors before landing smack down on the receptionist floor in the hospital. As he recovers, Baby Herman lands on Roger, causing him to cough up the rattle again, finally ending their adventure. But when Roger's celebration is short-lived, he sees the bill for their rampant destruction and faints, realizing he didn't win again. Herman then crawls over to the rattle, and as the screen fades to black, there is a gulping sound as he again swallows the rattle.

During the end credits, however, Herman spits the rattle out and angrily threatens more trouble if he has to swallow the rattle again. After attempting to cool Baby Herman down, Roger is greeted by Jessica, who seductively suggests they go home and play a little patty cake, in which a love-stricken Roger coos as they walk off.

=== Voice cast ===
- Charles Fleischer as Roger Rabbit
- Kathleen Turner as Jessica Rabbit
- Lou Hirsch as Baby Herman
- April Winchell as Mrs. Herman and Baby Herman's baby talk
- Richard Williams as Droopy
- Corey Burton as the surgeons

=== Live-action cast ===
- Sol Pavlovsky as Raoul J. Raoul
- Charles Noland and William Bronder as sign carriers

=== Production ===
Tummy Trouble was produced over the course of nine months by a staff of 70 Disney animators. It was the first animated short Disney had produced in 16 years to accompany the original release of a feature film, since Winnie the Pooh and Tigger Too in 1974.

Droopy's line, "Gruesome, isn't it?" was an outtake from the original film.

The music score for the short was composed by James Horner, and was the only of the three shorts to feature his music; Bruce Broughton would provide the music for the other two shorts.

The short was released theatrically with Walt Disney Pictures' Honey, I Shrunk the Kids and on that film's initial video release. An adaptation of this short appeared in the graphic novel Roger Rabbit: The Resurrection of Doom.

== Roller Coaster Rabbit ==
Roller Coaster Rabbit
- Film poster
- Directed by: Rob Minkoff; Frank Marshall (live-action sequence)
- Story by: Bill Kopp; Kevin Harkey; Lynne Naylor; Patrick A. Ventura
- Produced by: Donald W. Ernst
- Music by: Bruce Broughton
- Production companies: Walt Disney Feature Animation; Walt Disney Feature Animation Florida; Amblin Entertainment
- Distributed by: Buena Vista Pictures Distribution (Note: Distributed by Buena Vista Pictures Distribution through the Touchstone Pictures banner. Roller Coaster Rabbit was reissued under the Walt Disney Pictures banner for the 2013 Blu-ray release.)
- Release dates: June 15, 1990 (Theatrical release with Dick Tracy); November 22, 1995 (Theatrical release with Toy Story in select international territories)
- Running time: 8 minutes

=== Plot ===
Roger Rabbit, Baby Herman and Mrs. Herman are at the local county fair. Mrs. Herman leaves to get her palm read by a fortune teller and asks Roger to watch Baby Herman until she gets back. She also reminds him not to mess it up again. Roger reluctantly watches Baby Herman. Baby Herman loses his red balloon and bursts into tears when Roger goes to get him a new one. Before he returns, however, Baby Herman sees another red balloon at a dart game and goes to try to get it. When Roger comes back to give Baby Herman his balloon, he finds him gone and sets off as the chase begins. First, Baby Herman finds himself following the balloon into a field where a grazing bull is. Roger soon follows the youngster and falls into a pile of bull dung. Baby Herman walks directly underneath the bull. He notices a round balloon-like object and grasps it; unknown to him, it is in fact the bull's scrotum. The grazing creature snaps. Roger picks up Baby Herman, but just happens to be looking the bull in the eyes. The animal hurls Roger and Baby Herman into the air, sending them flying out of the field and causing them to crash into a roller coaster carriage which is slowly traveling up.

In the next stage of this short, the carriage continues to climb a tall hill on the track. The two reach the top of the drop, which is exaggerated to reach beyond the clouds and into space. Roger looks down and sees the world. Moments later, the carriage drops down thousands of meters. The speed of the drop is maintained throughout the remainder of the chase. After a few twists and turns (in the track), a shot of Jessica appears, where she is tied down to the tracks, unable to move. She calls out to be saved before Roger and Baby Herman's carriage crushes her. As the cart draws near, it topples over and fortunately bounces over Jessica, avoiding her completely. The camera moves along, and beside her appears Droopy for a quick one-liner. The story then continues. Roger grasps Baby Herman, tumbling and losing their carriage, leaving Roger sliding along the tracks on his feet, gradually gaining friction, causing his feet to catch fire. The tracks run into a dark tunnel and then stumble across a 'wrong way sign'. Finally, Herman and Roger crash through the sign and into a live-action filming studio, a direct reference to the reality/cartoon crossover in the feature film when Roger ruins the film and refuses to re-shoot the whole scene. As the credits finish rolling, Baby Herman says he cannot take any more of Roger, and a woman gives him a balloon, which he pops with his cigar.

=== Voice cast ===
- Charles Fleischer as Roger Rabbit
- Kathleen Turner as Jessica Rabbit
- Lou Hirsch as Baby Herman
- April Winchell as Mrs. Herman and Baby Herman's baby talk
- Corey Burton as Droopy
- Frank Welker as the Bull

=== Live-action cast ===
- Damian London as Fritz
- Joni Barnes as secretary
- Jim Bracken as a cameraman
- Ancel Cook as a fireman

=== Production ===
Roller Coaster Rabbit (along with Trail Mix-Up) was produced at The Magic of Disney Animation located at Disney-MGM Studios in Lake Buena Vista, Florida. (Note: The Magic of Disney Animation is operating at Disney's Hollywood Studios in Lake Buena Vista, Florida from 1989 to 2015 and 2026 onwards.) Rob Minkoff returned to direct the second short in the series, replacing Bill Kopp, who had been fired from the director position due to creative differences over the short's gags, pacing and humor. Computer animation was used for the coaster tracks, cars, and darts.

A deleted scene animated by Mark Kausler, Tracy Mark Lee and Phil Boyd involved Roger reacting in a Tex Avery-esque manner to Jessica in the Play-Toon magazine, turning into a wolf. Jessica was planned to wear a summer shirt, shorts and a bow in her hair. The scene with her and Droopy was initially different, and would have had them sharing a moment together on a railroad handcar. The short originally had a gag where Roger and Baby Herman would have reached the top of the roller coaster's lift hill and been paused by an intersection with a traffic light. At this point, a "Long Car" was to have zoomed through the intersection in front of them, ridden by Disney characters, including Mickey Mouse, Minnie Mouse (seated in the front car), Monstro from Pinocchio and Chernabog from Fantasia (towering over everyone from seats at the very back). The gag was eventually cut due to timing issues, as the characters would not be recognizable to the audience if the car went too fast and the momentum would be lost if it went too slow.

Bruce Broughton was brought on to provide the music for the film, replacing James Horner, who scored Tummy Trouble; Broughton would later return to score the third short, Trail Mix-Up.

Spielberg wanted the short to appear with Arachnophobia, Hollywood Pictures' first feature and a co-production between Disney and Amblin. However, CEO Michael Eisner opted to release the short with the US theatrical release of Touchstone Pictures' Dick Tracy, in hopes that the short would increase awareness of the film. Spielberg, who controlled a 50% ownership stake in the character, decided to cancel Hare in My Soup, the third short that had entered production.

Roller Coaster Rabbit is the only Roger Rabbit short to be rated "PG" due to some risqué humor.

== Trail Mix-Up ==
Trail Mix-Up
- Film poster
- Directed by: Barry Cook
- Story by: Rob Minkoff; Barry Cook; Mark Kausler; Patrick A. Ventura; Bill Kopp
- Produced by: Rob Minkoff
- Music by: Bruce Broughton
- Production companies: Walt Disney Feature Animation; Walt Disney Feature Animation Florida; Amblin Entertainment
- Distributed by: Buena Vista Pictures Distribution
- Release date: March 12, 1993 (Theatrical release with A Far Off Place)
- Running time: 9 minutes

=== Plot ===
The short features Roger Rabbit, Baby Herman and Mrs. Herman at the park setting up camp. Mrs. Herman plans to go hunting and leaves Roger in charge of watching Baby Herman. Trouble begins when Baby Herman wanders into the forest's dangers, and Roger has to save him, leading to multiple calamities, such as Roger panicking at the sight of a caterpillar and spraying so much insecticide (named Mink-Off) that many trees die. Later, when Roger reads the nutrition label on the box, Baby Herman follows a bee up to a beehive and goes to get some honey when Roger tries to save him. The beehive falls on Roger's head, stinging him multiple times. The bees proceed to chase him, so Roger runs into a lake, where he panics at the sight of a shark's dorsal fin (which is actually controlled by Droopy).

Later, Baby Herman follows a beaver (mistaking him for a dog), and is followed by Roger, who pursues them. Baby Herman follows the beaver up a pile of logs, and is pursued by Roger, who follows, only to have the log that Baby Herman and the beaver are on taken to the sawmill. This ends up with Roger being shredded by a sawmill (the result being 13 tiny Rogers, which then join again into a regular-sized Roger, who follows Baby Herman (still following the beaver) onto a conveyor belt with logs). It ends up with the logs being thrown down a log flume, eventually landing in a river. The log, Roger, Baby Herman, and the beaver are on, crashes into a bear, who also ends up on the log. Then the four fell off a waterfall. Roger's head gets stuck in a twig sticking out of the waterfall, and when he catches Baby Herman (holding on to the beaver), the bear grabs onto Roger's legs. The combined weight rebounds, sending all four flying, landing on a large boulder.

The boulder rolls down a hill, knocking over a tree trunk (with the same sound effects as a bowling pin) and then flying off a cliff. Eventually, Roger, the bear, the log, the beaver, the boulder, and Baby Herman all land on top of Old Predictable Geyser in that order. Then, Old Predictable Geyser erupts, sending Roger, Herman, the Bear, the Beaver, the boulder and the log flying out of the studio, passing the Hollywood Sign. The group flies over half the country, all the way to Mount Rushmore, and crashes into the mountain, destroying all the carvings of the presidents. Everyone is battered and beaten (except for Roger); as they walk away, Baby Herman yells at Roger for destroying a "national monument." Roger retorts that it's "not as if it's the end of the world," but then sticks a US flag (made of his clothes) in the ground, which punctures the Earth, making it deflate and blow away like a balloon.

=== Cast ===
- Charles Fleischer as Roger Rabbit
- Kathleen Turner as Jessica Rabbit
- Lou Hirsch as Baby Herman
- April Winchell as Mrs. Herman and Baby Herman's baby talk
- Corey Burton as Droopy
- Frank Welker as the Bear and Beaver

==== Additional cast ====
- Alice Playten as the Bee
- John Kassir as Mount Rushmore

=== Production ===
Trail Mix-Up was directed by Barry Cook, instead of Rob Minkoff, who remained a co-executive producer. Trail Mix-Up was the third and last Roger Rabbit short, and was again produced by Disney's Florida studio. Cook was hired to direct the short following the release of his previous short film Off His Rockers. Unlike the two previous shorts, the animation (still traditionally hand-drawn on paper) and compositing were done digitally in the studio's CAPS system.

Due to being housed in trailers, the crew working on the short took liberties with inside jokes, such as including cameo appearances of Mickey Mouse, Tinker Bell, the Genie from Aladdin, Evinrude from The Rescuers, background artist and art director Ric Sluiter (as the bees that Roger spits from his mouth) and the boy from Off His Rockers (in a "Wanted" poster"); naming Roger's insecticide after Minkoff, and giving Baby Herman Mickey-shaped irises and Roger skull and crossbones-shaped ones in the sawmill scene. Jeffrey Katzenberg wanted the scene with Jessica cut, but Cook convinced him to keep it and warned animators not to show the buttons on Jessica's uniform to avoid them being mistaken for nipples. Unlike the live-action segments in the two previous shorts, the Mount Rushmore presidents' destruction was achieved by blowing up a large sculptured miniature, constructed by Bob Spurlock and his crew from Stetson Visual Services at Golden Oak Ranch.

The short was released theatrically with Disney/Amblin's A Far Off Place on March 12, 1993.

== Home media ==
In 1995, a VHS tape of the three shorts was released under the title It's Roger Rabbit, bundled with Who Framed Roger Rabbit. A nearly identical video was released by itself in 1996 under the title Disney and Steven Spielberg present The Best of Roger Rabbit. The three shorts are also included in the 2003 special edition "Vista Series" DVD of Who Framed Roger Rabbit. On March 12, 2013, Walt Disney Studios Home Entertainment remastered and reissued all three shorts as part of the 25th anniversary Blu-ray release of Who Framed Roger Rabbit. All three shorts are available to stream on Disney+ as separate shorts; Tummy Trouble and Trail Mix-up are standalone listings, and Roller Coaster Rabbit is an extra for the original film. For some reason, Trail Mix-up is excluded in the UK.
