= Mulan (Disney character) =

Character from Disney's 1998 animated film

- Mulan character
- Mulan wearing her casual clothes
- First appearance: Mulan (1998)
- Created by: Robert D. San Souci
- Based on: Hua Mulan from the Ballad of Mulan
- Voiced by: Ming-Na Wen (speaking voice); Lea Salonga (singing voice); CoCo Lee (singing and speaking voice in Chinese)
- Portrayed by: Liu Yifei (2020 film); Crystal Rao (child; 2020 film)

In-universe information
- Full name: Fa Mulan; Hua Mulan (2020 film)
- Aliases: Fa Ping (male alter ego); Hua Jun (male alter ego; 2020 film)
- Occupation: Imperial agent Soldier; Farm girl Warrior
- Affiliation: Disney Princesses
- Family: 1998 film: Fa Zhou (father); Fa Li (mother); 2020 film: Hua Zhou (father); Hua Li (mother); Hua Xiu (sister)
- Spouse: Li Shang
- Relatives: Grandmother Fa (grandmother); General Li (father-in-law); First Ancestor Fa (ancestor)
- Nationality: Chinese

Fa Mulan is a fictional character, inspired by Hua Mulan, who appears in Walt Disney Pictures' 36th animated film Mulan (1998). Her speaking voice is provided by actress Ming-Na Wen, while actress and singer Lea Salonga provides the character's singing voice. Both her speaking and singing voice in Chinese are provided by singer CoCo Lee. Created by author Robert D. San Souci, Mulan is based on the legendary Xianbei Chinese warrior Hua Mulan from the poem the Ballad of Mulan. Her name "Fa Mulan" is inspired by the Yue Chinese name for the character, which is pronounced Fa Muklan. The only child of an aging war veteran, Mulan disregards both tradition and the law by disguising herself as a man in order to enlist herself in the army in lieu of her feeble father.

Disney had originally conceived Mulan as an oppressed young Chinese woman who ultimately elopes to Europe to be with a British prince. However, director Tony Bancroft, who was inspired by the well-being of his own daughters, wanted Mulan to be a different, unique kind of Disney heroine – one who is strong and independent, whose fate does not depend upon a male character. Thus, the relationship between Mulan and Captain Li Shang was changed to that of a minor subplot, while Mulan's bravery and strength were emphasized in order to ensure that she remained the hero of her own story. She became the eighth Disney Princess and the first one who is not actually a princess in her film, as she was not born of royalty nor did she become one by marrying a prince. While an argument could be made that Pocahontas is still technically a princess since she is a chieftain's daughter, Mulan is not, but is included in the lineup nonetheless. She also became the first one of East Asian descent as well. She is the last Disney Princess to be developed during the Disney Renaissance. Mulan's supervising animator was Mark Henn, who deliberately designed the character so that she would appear less feminine than her predecessors.

Reception towards Mulan's personality has been generally positive, with critics praising her bravery and heroism. However, her romantic relationship with Shang has been accused of compromising Mulan's heroism. Both Wen and Salonga have been awarded Disney Legends for their contributions to the role. Liu Yifei played the live-action version of the character in the 2020 live-action adaptation of the original 1998 film, named Hua Mulan.

== Development ==
=== Conception and writing ===
Mulan was originally conceived as an animated short in 1994, in which a miserable Chinese girl elopes to the West to be with a British prince. While developing a series of treatments based on traditional stories and folk tales, children's book author Robert D. San Souci discovered the Ballad of Mulan, an ancient Chinese poem about Hua Mulan – a Chinese woman who replaces her ailing father in the army by disguising herself as a man. Fascinated by Hua Mulan's story, San Souci suggested the poem to Disney; the studio hired San Souci himself to write the film's treatment and story.

Mulan explores the age-old theme of remaining true to oneself, with co-director Tony Bancroft summarizing the character's role in the film as "the story of a girl who can't help who she is but she exists in a different society that tells her who she is supposed to be." Because the Ballad of Mulan is such a beloved and well-known story, San Souci longed to maintain the character's integrity. However, certain creative liberties were taken with the story in regards to Mulan's role, such as the character neglecting to ask her parents' permission prior to enlisting herself in the army. Mulan's surname was rendered as the Yue Chinese (aka Cantonese) "Fa", though this was to pay respect to the poem being originally written in that language. Finally, Mulan's true identity is discovered much earlier in the film, soon after the army's initial encounter with the enemy, whereas her comrades remain ignorant throughout their entire 12 years at war until after Mulan has returned home.

Unlike preceding traditional Disney animated feature films, the developing romantic relationship between Mulan and Li Shang is treated as more of a subplot as opposed to a traditional central plot, as observed by film critic Andy Klein of Animation World Network. Klein commented, "Mulan isn't waiting for her prince to someday come; when he does arrive, having known her primarily as a man, and having learned to admire her for her deeper qualities, the romance is muted and subtle." Throughout the movie they are constantly working towards helping each other change into better and truer versions of themselves in order to achieve their true potential.

=== Voice ===
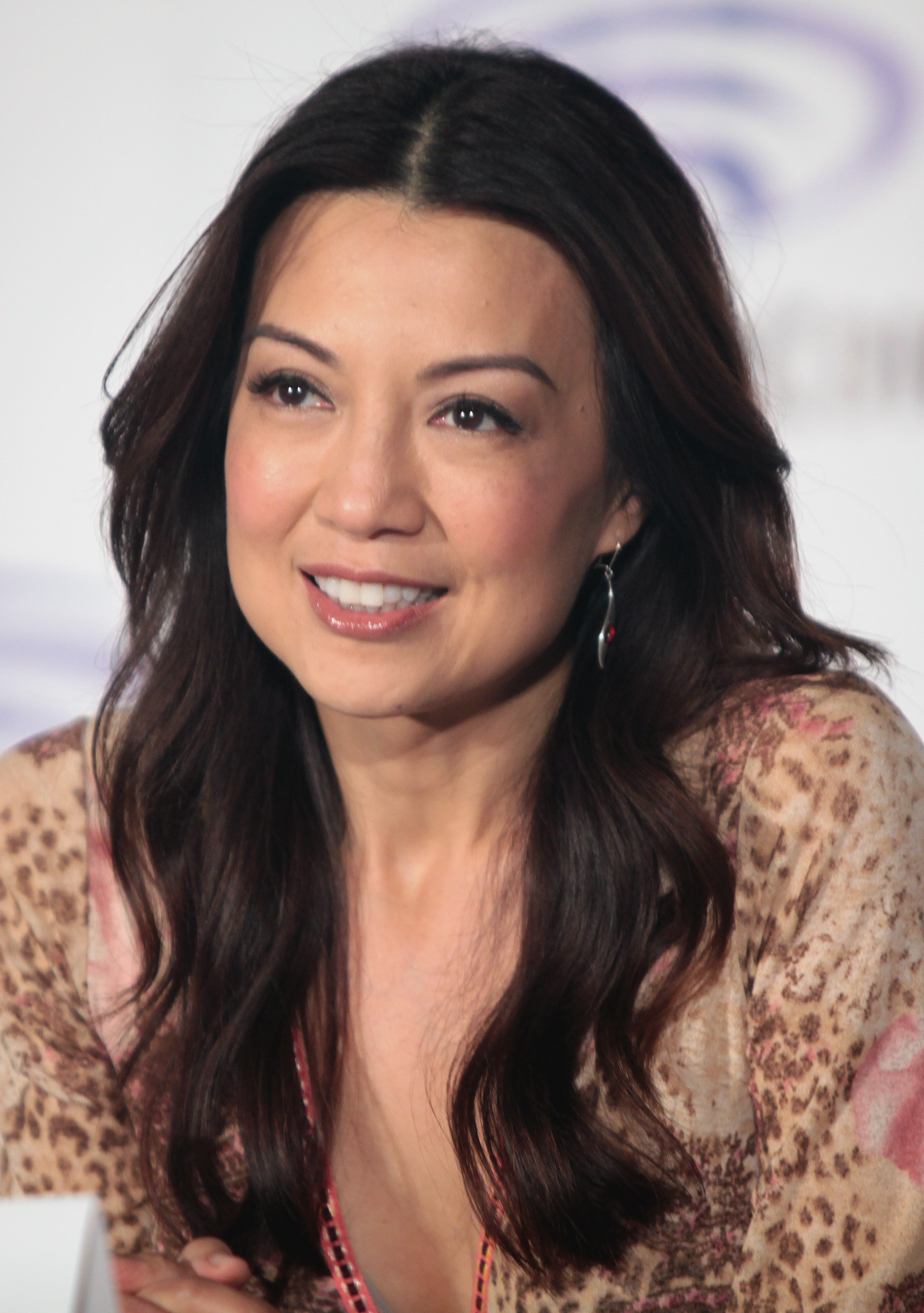
Actress Ming-Na Wen voiced Mulan in both animated films.

Mulan's speaking voice is provided by actress Ming-Na Wen. Because the character "represented [traditional] Chinese values" and is depicted as being "dramatic ... close to her father, very respectful," Bancroft believed that Wen possessed the "perfect" voice for Mulan, which he additionally described as "very Chinese." Born and raised in Macau, China, Wen was familiar with both the legend of Hua Mulan and the Ballad of Mulan at the time of her audition for the role, having grown up being read the poem by her mother. Wen explained, "I think every Chinese kid grows up with this story," additionally likening the poem's popularity in China to that of the Western Parson Weems fable in which American president George Washington chops down his father's beloved cherry tree.

Mulan served as Wen's first voice-acting role. In an interview with IGN, the actress elaborated on the recording process, specifically the fact that she was required to record the majority of the character's dialogue in isolation, saying, "I just loved the story so much and identified so much with the character of Mulan it was easy for me. I loved using my imagination. I felt like I was a little kid again, being silly with an imaginary sword and riding on an imaginary horse and talking to an imaginary dragon. So it was a lot of fun for me." In spite of the fact that, throughout the film, Mulan shares multiple scenes with her guardian, a miniature Chinese dragon named Mushu who is voiced by American actor and comedian Eddie Murphy, Wen and her co-star never actually encountered each other while working on Mulan due to the fact that they recorded their respective dialogue at separate times in separate locations.

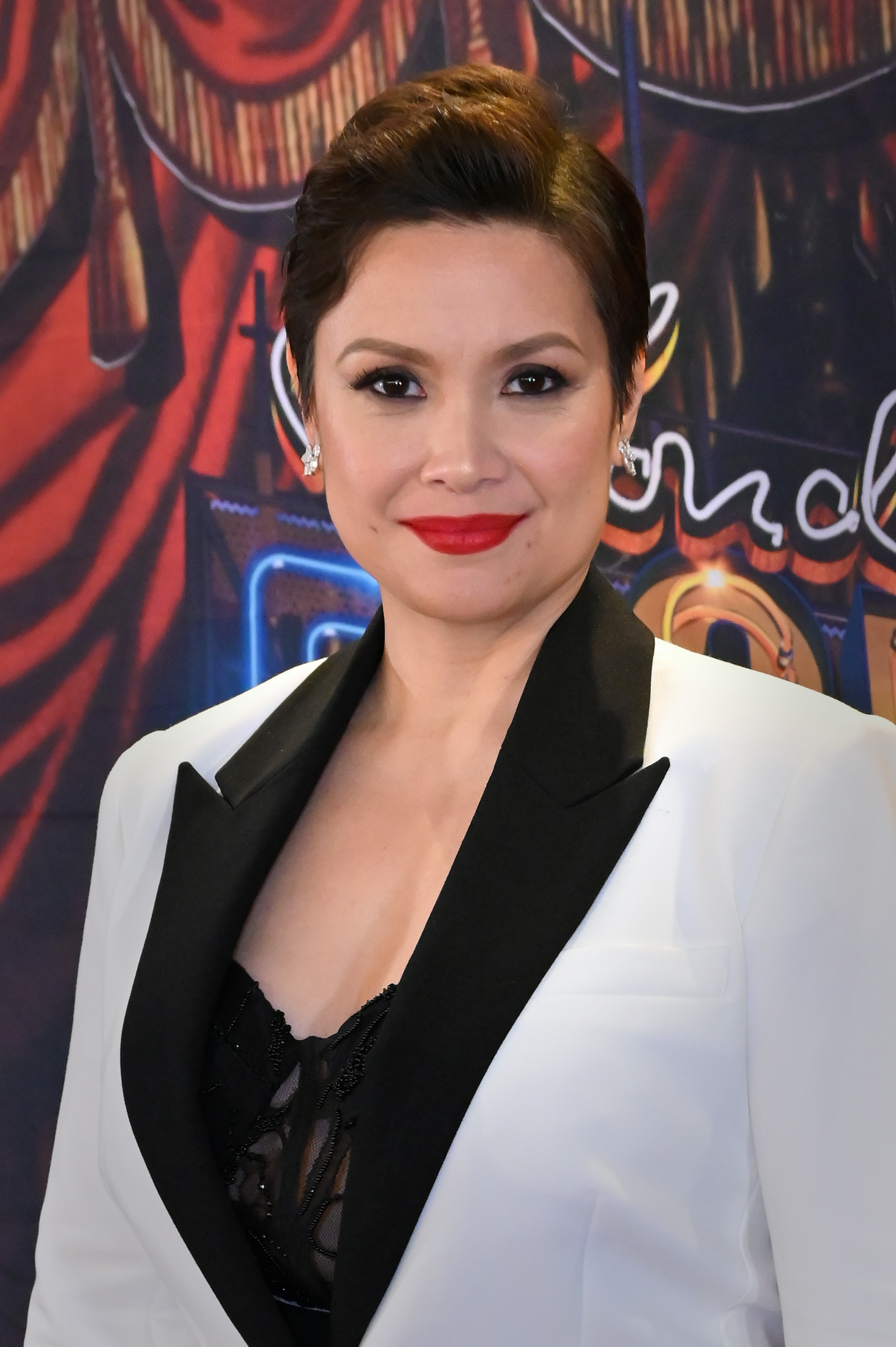
Actress and singer Lea Salonga provided the singing voice for Mulan in both animated films.

Upon being cast as Mulan's speaking voice, Wen was informed by Disney that she would not be providing the character's singing voice. She took no offense to this decision, commenting jokingly "I don't blame them." The directors hired Filipina singer and actress Lea Salonga to provide Mulan's singing voice, heard in the film's songs "Reflection", "I'll Make a Man Out of You" and "A Girl Worth Fighting For." According to Thomas S. Hischak, author of the book Disney Voice Actors: A Biographical Dictionary, Salonga was originally cast to provide both Mulan's speaking and singing voices. However, the directors eventually felt that her attempt at impersonating a man in the form of Mulan's male alter-ego "Ping" was rather unconvincing, and ultimately replacing Salonga with Wen. Six years prior to Mulan, Salonga provided the singing voice of Jasmine in Disney's Aladdin (1992) on behalf of American actress Linda Larkin. While auditioning for Mulan, Salonga asked jokingly, "Why do I have to audition? ... I was already a princess before. Wasn't that enough?"

=== Characterization and design ===
The film's screenplay was constantly being revised and re-written. Naturally, so was Mulan's characterization and role in the film. The writers wanted Mulan to represent a "different kind of Disney heroine," specifically described as one who "didn't need a tiara, but was still just as much as graceful, strong, and courageous." Between the two, Bancroft and his twin brother Tom, an animator who also worked on Mulan, have a total of seven daughters. This further inspired the filmmakers to portray Mulan as a unique heroine who is "not another damsel in distress" in favor of having her resemble "a strong female Disney character who would truly be the heroine of her own story" instead, essentially a "female role model. The characteristics of strength and courage were a must for Mulan." In an interview with The Christian Post, Bancroft elaborated on the way in which he, as the film's director, continued to consider the well-being of his two young daughters while working on Mulan, having "wanted to make a unique heroine that hadn't been seen before" and provide for them "someone who would be strong on her own, without a prince saving her." Addressing the way in which Mulan differs from traditional Disney heroines and princesses, Bancroft explained, "Most Disney heroines have an outside source that comes in and helps them change. Mulan stays consistent. From the first frame all the way through the end of the movie, her personality, her drive it all stays the same."

"When we drew her, we had the opportunity to actually adjust her design a little bit so that when she was disguised as Ping, as a soldier, that she was physically a little different in how we drew her than when she was herself as Mulan ... That was something we took advantage of. So, certainly, that was a challenge to have her disguised as a boy whereas she's still a girl who doesn't understand what being a boy is all about or about boys move and act, and that's part of how she learns ... that was part of the fun and the challenge of doing Mulan. You have essentially two characters to play with."
— Henn, on animating Mulan as "Ping".

Visually, the animators were influenced by both traditional Chinese and Japanese artwork. In the specific case of Mulan, "The characters' simple lines ... resemble classic Asian painting". Chinese artist Chen Yi mentored the animators, "helping [them] to come up with these designs." Mark Henn served as Mulan's supervising animator. Animating the character in her male disguise as "Ping" offered an unprecedented challenge for Henn. In order to solve this unique dilemma, Henn was provided with "the opportunity to adjust her design a little bit so that when she was disguised as Ping, as a soldier, that she was physically a little different in how [they] drew her than when she was herself as Mulan." Physically, Mulan was also designed to appear less feminine than preceding traditional Disney animated heroines, specifically Pocahontas from Pocahontas (1995) and Esmeralda from The Hunchback of Notre Dame (1996), because "you can't pass as a man in the army with a Barbie-style figure."

Henn revealed that he was drawn to "Mulan's story [because it] was so unique and compelling that it just captivated me from the beginning". Animating the characters' distinct emotions using the traditional Chinese style turned out to be somewhat challenging for Henn. The animator explained, "We don't create realism in the sense that if you're doing a human character, it's not going to look realistic ... the balance is finding an appealing way of drawing using the visual tools that you have in the design to convey the believable emotions that you want to get across." In addition to Mulan, Henn was also responsible for animating Fa Zhou, Mulan's elderly father. He described the complex relationship between the two characters as "the emotional heart of the story". Fathering one daughter himself, Henn drew inspiration from his own emotions as well as past personal experiences while animating several intimate scenes shared by the two characters.

Several film critics have described Mulan as a tomboy. Andy Patrizio of IGN observed, "In this slightly modernized version of the story, Mulan is something of a rebel and a tomboy. She has no interest in being a good little subservient wife, despite her sighing parents' wishes." Jo Johnson, in contribution to the book Queers in American Popular Culture Volume 1: Film and Television, wrote that "Unlike other Disney heroines, Mulan is immediately coded as a tomboy," observing the way in which the character speaks using a full mouth. Johnson additionally noticed several ways in which Mulan's design and personality differ from those typically associated with traditional Disney heroines and princesses, citing the character's clumsy, awkward demeanor; broad shoulders and muscular limbs; unruly single strand of hair; and choice of everyday attire which usually consists of loose, baggy clothing concealing her "traditionally slim Disney waist." Additionally, Mulan's intelligence has been observed in several professional analyses, with critics often citing the character as "brainy."

== Appearances ==
=== Films ===
==== Mulan ====
The Huns, led by Shan Yu, invade China by breaching the Great Wall. The Chinese emperor orders that the army protect his citizens over himself, general mobilization, issuing a conscription that one man from each family to join the Chinese army. After Mulan's meeting with the matchmaker goes horribly awry, Chi Fu arrives at her home to enlist her father. Although she protests knowing her veteran father can not survive another war, Mulan is silenced by both Chi Fu and her father. That evening, Mulan takes her father's old armor and disguises herself as a boy named Ping, enlisting in the army on his behalf. Upon learning of Mulan's departure, the ancestors order the small dragon Mushu, a disgraced former guardian, to awaken the "great stone dragon" so that he may retrieve Mulan, only for Mushu to destroy the statue. Mushu decides to join Mulan in the army and help train her in the hopes that the ancestors will crown him a guardian once again.

Reporting to the training camp, Mulan is able to pass as a man, although her military skills are initially lacking. Mushu provides clumsy guidance to Mulan on how to behave like a man. Under the command of Captain Li Shang, she and her fellow recruits Yao, Ling, and Chien-Po, gradually become trained warriors. Desiring to see Mulan succeed, Mushu creates a fake order from Shang's father, General Li, ordering Shang to follow the main imperial army into the mountains. The reinforcements set out, but arrive at a burnt-out encampment, where they discover that General Li and his troops have been massacred by the Huns.

As the reinforcements solemnly leave the mountains, they are ambushed by the Huns, but Mulan cleverly uses a cannon to cause an avalanche, which buries most of the invaders. An enraged Shan Yu slashes her in the chest, and after the avalanche subsides, her deception is revealed when the wound is bandaged.

Instead of executing Mulan as the law requires, Shang spares her life, but nonetheless expels her from the army. Mulan is left to follow alone as the recruits depart for the imperial city to report the news of the Huns' destruction. However, it is discovered that six Hun warriors, including Shan Yu, have survived the avalanche, and Mulan catches sight of them as they make their way to the city, intent on capturing the emperor.

At the imperial city, Mulan is unable to convince Shang about Shan Yu's survival; the Huns capture the emperor, and seize the palace. With Mulan's help, Yao, Ling, and Chien-Po pose as concubines, and are able to enter the palace. With the help of Shang, they defeat Shan Yu's men; as Shang prevents Shan Yu from assassinating the Emperor, Mulan lures the Hun leader onto the roof, where she engages him in single combat. Meanwhile, acting on Mulan's instructions and signal, Mushu fires a large skyrocket at Shan Yu. The rocket strikes, and propels him into a fireworks launching tower, where he dies in the resulting explosion.

Mulan is praised by the Emperor and the assembled inhabitants of the city, who bow to her in an unprecedented honor. While she accepts the crest of the Emperor, and the sword of Shan Yu as gifts, she politely declines his offer to be his advisor, and asks to return to her family.

Mulan returns home, where she presents these gifts to her father, who is overjoyed to have Mulan back safely. Having become enamored with Mulan, Shang soon arrives under the pretext of returning her helmet, but accepts the family's invitation to stay for dinner. Mushu is reinstated as a Fa family guardian by the ancestors amid a returning celebration. When Mulan thanks Mushu, she kisses him on the forehead, followed by her dog, Little Brother, and a flock of chickens bursting into the Temple, with a Great Ancestor calling Mushu's name, ending the film.

==== Mulan II ====
One whole month after the events of the original movie, Mulan and Li Shang prepare to marry but are distracted by a task from the Emperor, who wants his three daughters escorted to their own marriage ceremony. Their romantic relationship becomes somewhat strained during the trip, as the romantic couple has differing views on various issues. Meanwhile, Mushu realizes that if Mulan marries Shang, she will not need him anymore as her guardian spirit, and decides to trick the two into breaking up. When bandits attack, Mulan and Shang fight them off, but Mulan is devastated when Shang is seemingly killed trying to save her. To make sure the three princesses are not forced to marry against their will, Mulan takes their place marrying the eldest son of the ruler of the neighboring land. Shang survives the accident and arrives in time to stop the wedding but ultimately Mulan is saved by Mushu who, posing as the mighty Golden Dragon of Unity, frees the three princesses from their vows, and marries Mulan and Li Shang himself causing Mulan to forgive him for his actions. Afterwards, Mulan informs Li Shang of Mushu's existence and he combines the temples of his family and hers, allowing Mushu to keep his position.

==== Ralph Breaks the Internet ====
Mulan, alongside other Disney Princesses, appeared in the film Ralph Breaks the Internet, as was announced at the 2017 D23 Expo.

==== Live-action film ====
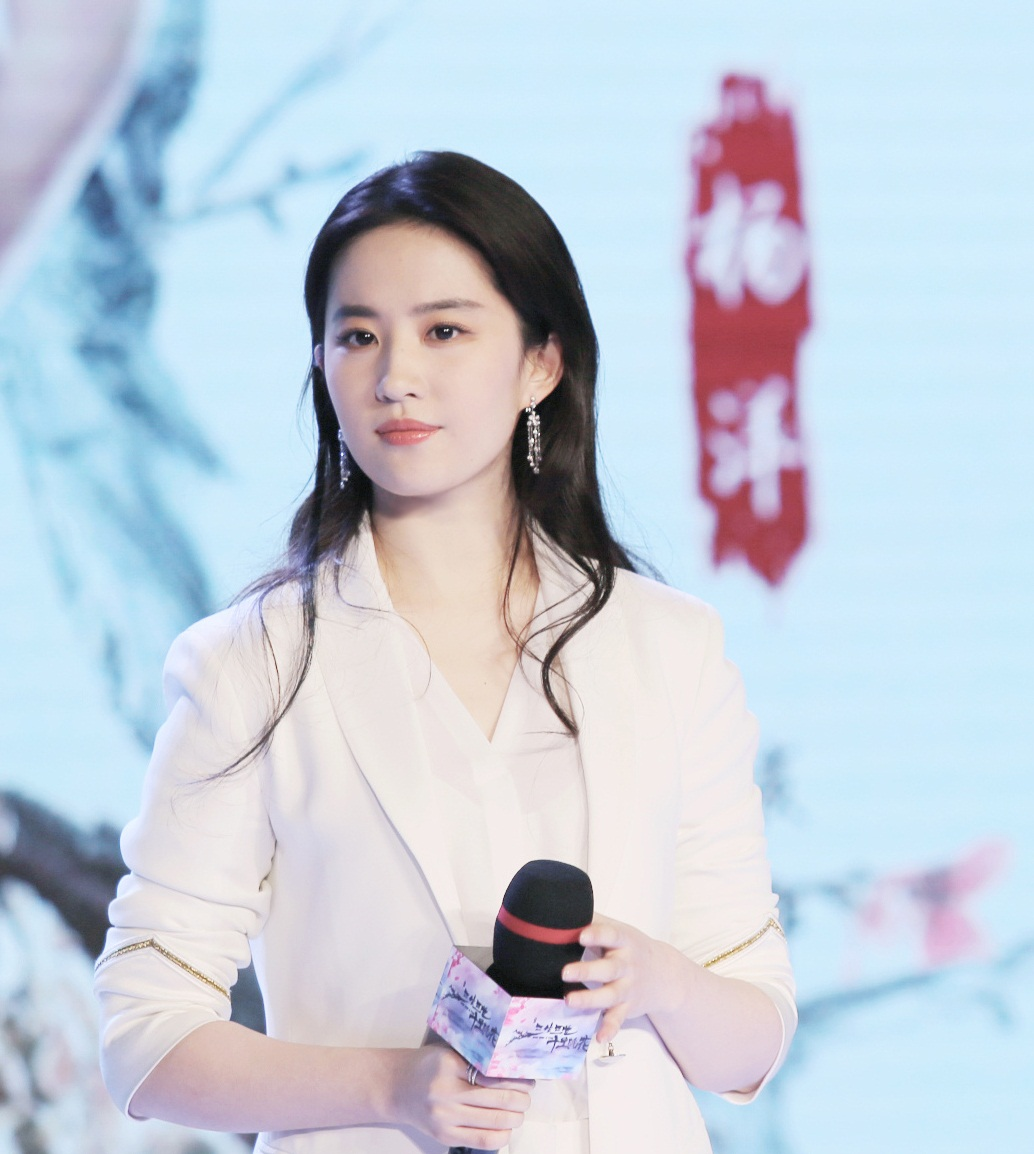
Liu Yifei

Liu Yifei portrays Mulan in a live-action adaptation of the 1998 animated film. The character's journey through the live-action film is mostly the same as the animated film. Although she does have a sister, who was not featured in the original film, and she reconsiders joining the Emperor's Guard after returning home. A phoenix also serves as a guardian to her instead of Mushu. Liu's portrayal as Mulan in the 2020 film was generally well received by critics. (Note: Attributed to multiple references:)

==== Once Upon a Studio ====
Mulan appears in the short film Once Upon a Studio. She sings with Snow White and Asha near the end of "When You Wish Upon a Star" and sits next to Shang and her army companions in the group photo.

Her original singing voice, Lea Salonga, returned to voice the character for the short.

=== Disney Princess franchise ===
Mulan is the eighth official member of the Disney Princess franchise, a media franchise marketed towards young girls. For children, Mulan demonstrates the positive aspects of never giving up, not being restricted to gender roles and the importance of family and honor. These aspects of the film are more in keeping with a traditional Chinese perspective on cultural value, such as the importance of family and honor. On the official Disney Princess website, the character's brief biography reads, "Mulan is a loving girl who is always brave and bold. When her country needs it most, she disguises herself as a man and goes off to fight. She uses courage and determination to win the day." Although Mulan is a member of the Disney Princess franchise, she is not a legitimate princess in the traditional sense, as she was neither born the daughter of a king or queen, nor does she become princess consort by marrying a prince. She is the franchise's first and currently only East Asian member.

=== Attractions ===
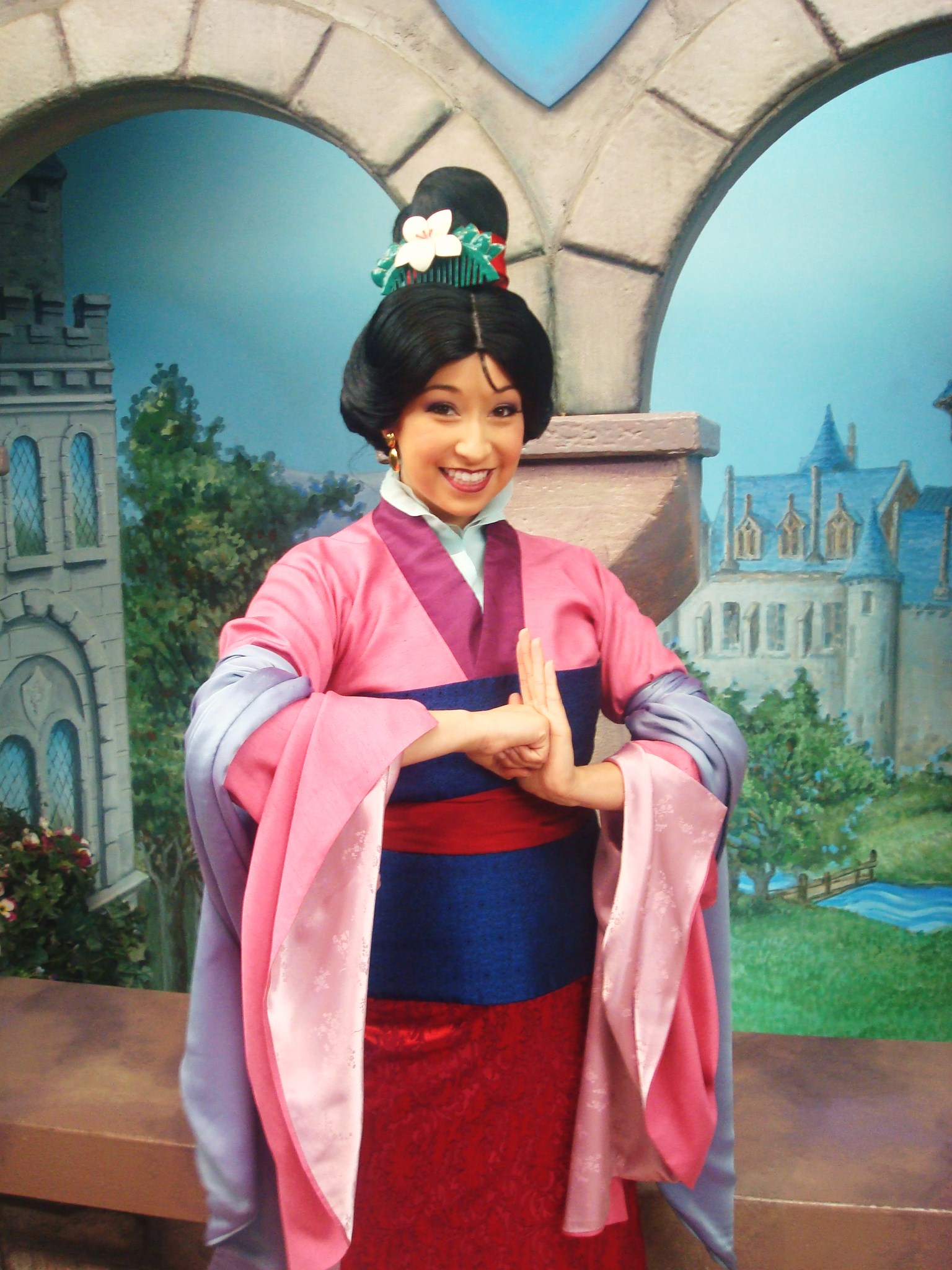
Mulan at Disneyland theme park in California.

Mulan appears regularly for meet-and-greets, parades and shows at the Walt Disney Parks and Resorts, including at the Chinese Pavilion at Epcot. Mulan and Mushu, as a kite, make cameo appearances in the Hong Kong Disneyland and Disneyland Resort versions of It's a Small World. In most of the parks she is most commonly found alongside Li Shang and Mushu in Adventureland. As a tribute, there is a portrait of her along with the other Disney Princesses at the Princess Fairytale Hall at the Magic Kingdom.

On the Disney Cruise Line ships and in Hong Kong Disneyland, Mulan and Li Shang appear in the stage show The Golden Mickeys. Mulan is also known to come out for meet-and-greets on the ships as well. She is also featured in the Disney on Ice shows Princess Classics and Princess Wishes.

=== Television ===
Mulan makes cameo appearances in the House of Mouse television series and its direct-to-video film Mickey's Magical Christmas: Snowed in at the House of Mouse. She was scheduled to appear in the second installment of the Disney Princess Enchanted Tales series of DVDs along with Cinderella. It was to premiere in 2008 but was cancelled due to poor sales of the first DVD.

In August 2014, Ming-Na Wen and Lea Salonga reprise their roles as Mulan for the first time since Mulan II in the Disney Junior show Sofia the First. In the episode "Princesses to the Rescue," Mulan reminds Sofia and her friends Amber and Jun they are "Stronger Than They Know" in song.

Mulan is one of the main characters of the 2026 television special Lego Disney Princess: Magical Mayhem.

=== Video games ===
Mulan appears as a playable character in Disney's Story Studio: Mulan, an action video game released in December 1999 by Disney Interactive Studios exclusively for the video game console Sony PlayStation. Loosely based on the plot of the original animated film, the video game's concept and premise revolves around "Players ... assum[ing] the role of Mulan on her quest to recover the missing scrolls." Mulan also appears as a playable character in Disney's Mulan, a similar video game released the previous year on October 10, 1998, by THQ for Game Boy.

Mulan appears in Kingdom Hearts II as part of the Land of the Dragons world, with Ming-Na Wen reprising her role. She aids Sora in battle, taking the place of either Donald Duck or Goofy. She uses a jian called "Sword of the Ancestor" for regular combat, and her combination attacks include Red Rocket and other fire attacks, thanks to Mushu. She goes under her pseudonym (Ping) for the majority of Sora's first visit to her world, which follows the storyline of the film, but has abandoned it by the time of their second visit, which follows a new story where they come into conflict with Xigbar and the Storm Rider Heartless.

Disney Infinity 3.0 has Mulan as one of the playable characters, like other characters in the game, with a figurine of the character being released that must be connected to the game to play with her. Mulan is a playable character to unlock for a limited time in Disney Magic Kingdoms. She is also an unlockable racer in Disney Speedstorm. In Disney Dreamlight Valley, she appears as a villager of the titular valley.

=== Books ===
In the fourth book in the Twisted Tales series, author Elizabeth Lim asks the question What if Mulan had to journey to the Underworld? In the book, Li Shang is mortally wounded in battle and Mulan journeys to the Chinese underworld to save Shang's soul and bring him back to life. The book draws heavily on Chinese mythology.

== Reception and legacy ==
=== Critical response ===
Reception towards Mulan's personality and characterization have been generally positive. Time Out hailed Mulan as "A feisty young go-getter [who] rises above the male-dominated world in which she lives." Ken Fox of TV Guide wrote, "Intelligent and fiercely independent, Mulan ... runs afoul of social expectations that a woman will be always obedient and duty-bound to her husband." Bridget Byrne of Boxoffice wrote that "Mulan ... has pride, charm, spirit and aesthetic appeal which prevents her from being upstaged by the vigorous and exciting action in which she participates." Variety's Todd McCarthy praised the character for inspiring "a turn of the circle from such age-old Disney classics ... in which passive heroines were rescued by blandly noble princes." McCarthy continued, "Here, it's the girl who does the rescuing, saving not only the prince but the emperor himself from oblivion, and this in a distant culture where women were expected to obey strictly prescribed rules." Similarly, Margaret A. McGurk of The Cincinnati Enquirer lauded Mulan for "solv[ing] her G.I. Jane dilemma by proving that brains can do more than brawn." Hailing the character as "Among the strongest heroines in Walt's cartoon canon," Ian Freer of Empire enthused, "Mulan's engaging mixture of vulnerability and derring-do becomes incredibly easy to root for." Hollis Chacona of The Austin Chronicle dubbed Mulan a "winning protagonist." Likewise, the Los Angeles Times' Kenneth Turan wrote, "As a vivacious rebel who has to be true to herself no matter what, Mulan is an excellent heroine, perfect for the young female demographic the studio is most anxious to attract", additionally calling her a "more likable and resourceful role model than Pocahontas".

Although largely well-liked, Mulan's characterization has drawn some mild criticism and speculation, inspiring a series of generally mixed to positive reviews from some film critics. Entertainment Weekly's Owen Gleiberman wrote, "Far more than Beauty and the Beast or the stolidly virtuous Pocahontas, Mulan showcases a girl who gets to use her wits ... a testament to the power of mind over brawn." However, Gleiberman continued, "Mulan finally falls a notch short of Disney's best ... because the heroine's empowerment remains ... an emotionally isolated quest." Similarly, Moira Macdonald of The Seattle Times hailed Mulan as "a strong, engaging character who, unlike many of her Disney counterparts, needs no one to rescue her from danger," while questioning her personality, asking, "was it really necessary to bestow Mulan with self-esteem problems? Because she seems so confident and intelligent, her sad statement that she wants to 'see something worthwhile' in the mirror comes as a bit of a shock."

Critics were not unanimous in their praise. The Phoenix's Jeffrey Gantz felt that character was unoriginal, inaccurate and Westernized, writing, "[her] costumes (particularly the kimono and obi Mulan wears to the Matchmaker) and hairdos look Japanese ... Give Mulan Native American features and you have Pocahontas." Similarly, James Berardinelli of ReelViews felt that the character's depiction was too "familiar," reviewing, "Although she looks different from Ariel, Belle, Jasmine, and Pocahontas, Mulan is very much the same type of individual: a woman with a strong, independent streak who is unwilling to bend to the customs of her culture, which decree that the role of the female is to be ornamental. The film isn't very subtle in reinforcing the idea of equality between the sexes". Additionally, some critics, such as Alex von Tunzelmann of The Guardian, have criticized Mulan for her violence, writing, "Disney struggles to make Mulan both a killer and a heroine ... Gingerly, the film attempts to tread a middle path, implying that Mulan annihilates most of the Hun army by causing an avalanche, and having her dispatch Shan Yu with a load of fireworks. Very pretty. But still technically killing." However, von Tunzelmann did conclude more positively, "as Disney heroines go, Mulan herself is a clear improvement on the standard-issue drippy princess."

==== Relationship with Shang ====
Unlike the generally positive reviews received by Mulan, critical reception towards the character's romantic relationship with Li Shang has been largely negative, drawing much speculation from critics who accused Mulan of having "a typical girl-hooks-up-with-boy ending." Roger Ebert of the Chicago Sun-Times observed, "The message here is standard feminist empowerment: Defy the matchmaker, dress as a boy, and choose your own career. But Mulan has it both ways, since inevitably Mulan's heart goes pitty-pat over Shang, the handsome young captain she's assigned to serve under. The movie breaks with the tradition in which the male hero rescues the heroine, but is still totally sold on the Western idea of romantic love." The New York Times' Janet Maslin negatively opined, "For all of Mulan's courage and independence in rebelling against the matchmakers, this is still enough of a fairy tale to need Mr. Right."

Citing Mulan's relationship with Shang as an example of sexism, a film critic writing for Teen Ink wrote:

"Mulan has been hailed as a feminist Disney movie because it showcases a young woman who leads China to victory using her quick wit, pride, and a strong sense of family honor—all while masquerading as a man named Ping. Even though Mulan (as Ping) gains the respect of the army commander and her comrades, once they discover that she is a woman, her army commander and potential love-interest, Shang, loses respect for her and even hates her. "Ping" had been doing an even better job than Shang, but when Shang finds out Ping is a woman, his stupid male ego breaks on impact. Mulan is sentenced to death, and Shang, the macho man of the film, ultimately gets to decide her fate. The only reason she survives is because Shang decides he'd rather just send her home. Wow. To add insult to injury, at the end of the film, Shang fixes up his shattered ego by claiming Mulan as a suitor. Even as Mulan is being praised and cheered in the Forbidden City after she almost single-handedly saves China (this time, as a woman), at the end of the film, the audience is reminded that Mulan is really just another woman looking for a man. Mulan's real victory isn't saving her country from invasion. No, it's marrying Shang."

— Teen Ink

Betsy Wallace of Common Sense Media observed that Mulan "doesn't fit the princess mold, and most moviegoers had never heard of her." Conclusively, Wallace wrote, "it's too bad that in the end she still needs to be married off to a 'Prince Charming' who saves the day." In contribution to the book Beyond Adaptation: Essays on Radical Transformations of Original Works, Lan Dong wrote, "Even though Mulan achieves success after she resumes her female self ... it is compromised by Mulan and Li Shang's potential engagement at the end of the film."

=== Cultural significance and accolades ===
Mulan is culturally recognized for her unique role in Mulan specifically in regards to the character's heroism, ethnicity and disinterest in romance, serving as a departure from traditional Disney heroines and princesses because she "challenged gender stereotypes and offered up an animated Disney experience that isn't princess-centric" as "one of the few strong, self-propelled female characters that Disney has." Kenneth Turan of the Los Angeles Times observed the way in which Mulan's role in the film as "an independent, not completely boy-crazy heroine is somewhat new for Disney." According to Sara Veal of The Jakarta Post, Mulan "promotes self-reliance, determination and is uninterested in marriage or romance ... the film ends on her saving her country, rather than a romantic resolution." Succeeding non-white Disney Princesses Jasmine and Pocahontas, Mulan's characterization as Disney's first East Asian princess assisted in the diversification of the Disney Princess franchise, introducing "Disney princesses ... portrayed as women of color." Peter Travers of Rolling Stone commented, "Mulan ... makes a feisty prefeminist," continuing, "She doesn't swoon over Captain Shang, the hunky officer ... which leaves Shang ... frustrated ... Mulan, let the record show, does not put out." PopMatters' Jesse Hassenger wrote that unlike other Disney films, "Mulan holds the advantage of a smart, strong heroine—not just a superhot princess figure." Ryan Mazie of Box Office Prophets felt that Mulan "might be the most important and forward-thinking Disney Princess movie made up until that point where the female character solely takes control over her own destiny without the aid of a mighty Prince."

In 2012, CNN's Stephanie Goldberg recognized Mulan as one of Disney's bravest and most heroic animated heroines to-date in her article "Brave's Merida and other animated heroines," writing, "Mulan bent traditional gender roles when she took her father's place in the Chinese army." Similarly, in 2013, Mulan was ranked the greatest animated Disney heroine according to a poll conducted by Jim Vejvoda of IGN.

In 1999, Mulan's theme song "Reflection", performed by Mulan, was nominated for the Golden Globe Award for Best Original Song at the 56th Golden Globe Awards, but ultimately lost to Celine Dion and Andrea Bocelli's "The Prayer" from Quest for Camelot (1998). "Reflection" is often credited with establishing the successful musical career of American recording artist Christina Aguilera, who famously recorded a pop rendition of the ballad prior to the release of her platinum-selling self-titled debut album in 1999, on which the song is featured. Additionally, the song peaked at number nineteen on the Billboard Adult Contemporary chart. In 2011, Salonga was honored with a Disney Legends award in commemoration of her role as Mulan's singing voice. Additionally, Salonga performed a live rendition of "Reflection" at the ceremony. Ming-Na Wen was also named a Disney Legend in 2019 for her role as the speaking voice of Mulan.

=== Redesign controversy ===
The 2013 Disney princess redesigns portrayed Mulan with features that differ from her film appearance. The artwork featured Mulan with blue eyes, bigger lips, noticeably lighter skin, and golden clothing which does not resemble any outfit she has worn in the film. Her new appearance has caused an uproar due to the whitewash of her character. This was particularly troubling as Mulan is one of the few princesses of color. Shavon L. McKinstry of SPARK Movement writes that Mulan's redesign "seem to be directly counter to her personality and character in her film", and also notes how all the princesses of color have been "noticeably pushed to the back or left out completely" from the new Disney merchandise which featured the redesigns.

McKinstry argues that Disney "prefers to portray one demographic of princess, simultaneously alienating so much of their fanbase", pointing out that of the "ten Disney Princesses in the brand, six are white". The importance of Mulan and other non-white princesses can be seen in the 2009 study of the effects of children's cartoons on the body image of young girls by doctors Sharon Hayes and Stacey Tantleff-Dunn. The study revealed that in the group of girls ranging from 3 to 6 years old, 30.6% of the group would change their physical appearance if they could. Of these respondents, over half would change their hair and over a quarter would change something about their body, such as skin color. Of all girls surveyed, 8% said they would have to change their hair or skin color to become a princess, stating things like they would "change from brown skin to white skin", for example. The interviewed group was predominantly white.

Disney has since altered the coloration in Mulan's design by changing the blue eye highlight to brown, darkening the color of her skin, and changing her clothing to better resemble her attire in the film.
