= Adapted for the Screen =

2010 book by Hsiu-Chuang Deppman

First edition

Adapted for the Screen: The Cultural Politics of Modern Chinese Fiction and Film is a 2010 non-fiction book by Hsiu-Chuang Deppman, published by University of Hawaii Press.

The book discusses seven Chinese short stories and novels adapted into films and their respective films. Xiao Jiwei of Fairfield University described six of the films documented as being "canonical" as they became key parts of Chinese film curricula at American universities and had won film awards. Xiao argued that the book "may be better read as a collection of essays than as a book with a central theme and method."

The author disagrees with the idea that the primary way to judge a film adaptation of a work is to see how faithful it is to the original work it is based on.

== Contents ==
The first chapter is "Wang Dulu and Ang Lee: Artistic Creativity and Sexual Freedom in Crouching Tiger, Hidden Dragon." The second is "Su Tong and Zhang Yimou: Women's Places in Raise the Red Lantern." Red Rose White Rose is discussed in the third chapter. The fourth chapter is "Liu Yichang and Wong Kar-wai: The Class Trap in In the Mood for Love. The fifth and sixth chapters discuss Balzac and the Little Chinese Seamstress and A Time to Live, a Time to Die.

== Reception ==
Robert Chi of University of California, Los Angeles wrote that the work "is a strategic and eminently usable resource for teachers and students alike" and that the "strengths" of the work are its academic foundational abilities, its ability to be supplemented, and its ability to support analysis of texts.

Xiao argued that even though the author may have not intentionally talked about "an overarching paradigm", Xiao felt the book should have had discussion of methodology or theory.

Zhuoyi Wang at Hamilton College wrote that the book "is an innovative and engaging work".
