= Liu Yifei =

American actress (born 1987)

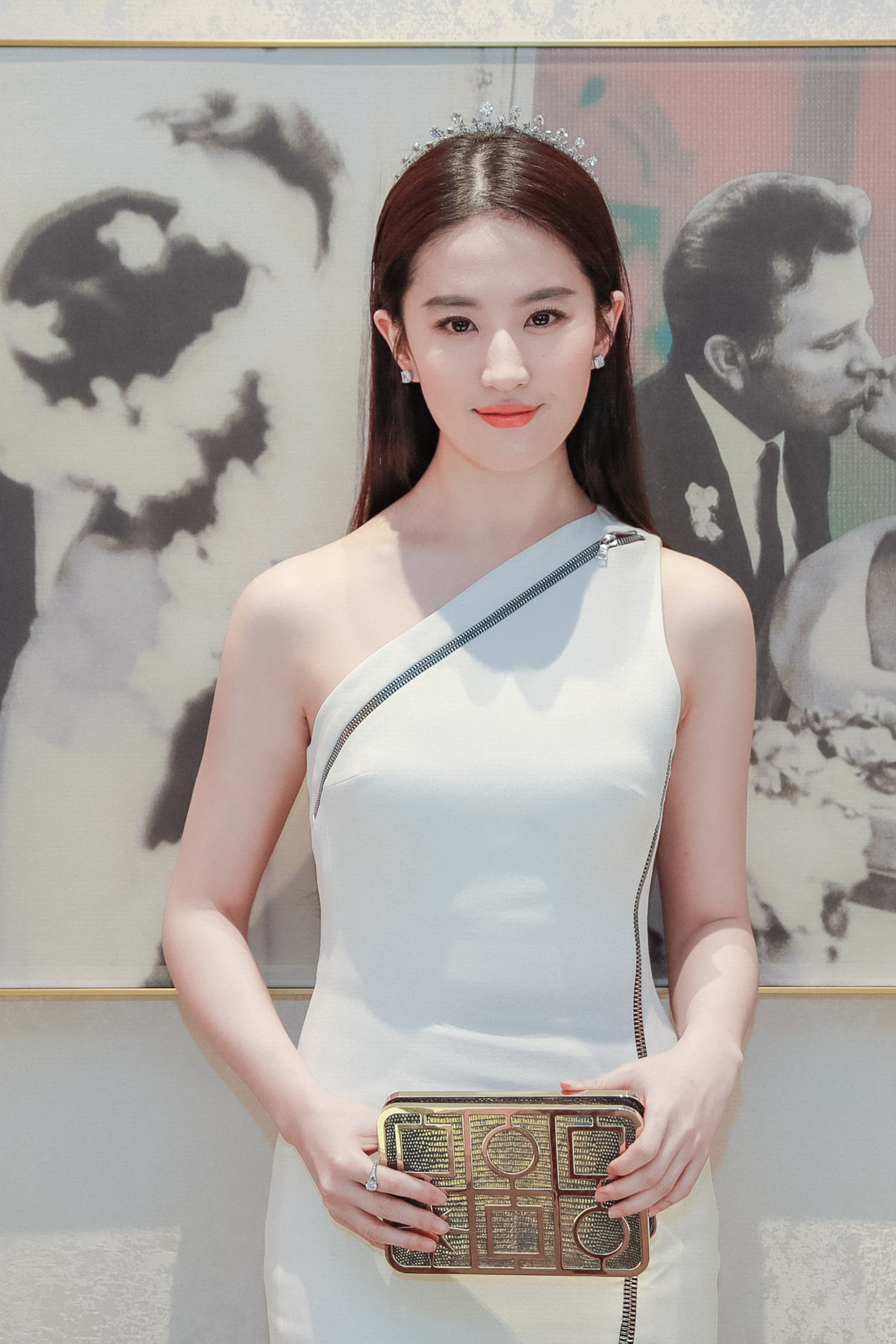
- Liu in 2017
- Born: An Feng; August 25, 1987 (age 39); Wuhan, Hubei, China
- Other name: Crystal Liu
- Citizenship: China (before 2002); United States (after 2002)
- Education: Beijing Film Academy
- Occupation: Actress
- Years active: 2002–present

Liu Yifei (刘亦菲; born August 25, 1987) is an American (Note: Liu only holds United States citizenship. China's nationality laws do not recognize dual nationality, and if a Chinese national acquires a foreign nationality, "they automatically lose Chinese nationality". Her birthplace, family and early life are all covered in the "Early life" section.) actress. She has appeared multiple times on Forbes China Celebrity 100 list and was named one of the New Four Dan actresses of China by Tencent Entertainment in 2009. She is known for her roles in Chinese TV shows such as The Story of a Noble Family, Demi-Gods and Semi-Devils, Chinese Paladin, A Dream of Splendor, The Tale of Rose and Meet Yourself. She became known to international audiences as the titular character in the Disney live-action film Mulan.

== Early life ==
Liu was born on August 25, 1987 in Tongji Hospital in Wuhan, Hubei as An Feng (安风). She is an only child. Her father is An Shaokang (安少康), who served as a first secretary of the Education Office of the Chinese Embassy in France and director of the Confucius Institute at the University of Paris VII. Her mother is Liu Xiaoli (刘晓莉), a dancer and stage performer from Hubei. Her parents divorced when she was 10 years old, and she was raised solely by her mother. That same year, she adopted her mother's surname and changed her name to "Liu Ximeizi" (刘茜美子). Her godfather is Chen Jinfei (陈金飞), the Chairman of Beijing Tongchan Investment Group.

In 1997, when Liu was 10 years old, she and her mother immigrated to the United States. She lived in Queens, New York City where she attended Louis Pasteur Middle School 67. In 2002, she returned to China to pursue an acting career and took the stage name "Liu Yifei" (刘亦菲). Several weeks after returning to China, Liu was accepted into the Performance Institute of Beijing Film Academy at age 15 and graduated in 2006.

== Career ==
=== 2003–2006: Rising popularity ===
Immediately after her admittance into the Beijing Film Academy, Liu received offers to star in various television series. Her first television appearance in 2003 was in the period romance drama The Story of a Noble Family (金粉世家), based on Zhang Henshui's eponymous novel. The series achieved the highest ratings on CCTV, and positive reviews from the audience. The same year, she was chosen by Zhang Jizhong to play Wang Yuyan in Demi-Gods and Semi-Devils, an adaptation of Louis Cha's wuxia novel of the same title. Liu's role as Wang Yuyan earned her the nickname of "Fairy Sister" in China, as the character is nicknamed in the show.

In 2005, Liu starred in Chinese Paladin, a fantasy action drama adapted from the role-playing game The Legend of Sword and Fairy. The drama earned a cult following and solidified her popularity in China.

After the drama aired, Liu gained acclaim for her performance and swiftly experienced a surge in popularity. The same year, she was chosen as the "Golden Eagle Goddess" at the 6th China Golden Eagle TV Art Festival.

=== 2008–2013: Transition to film ===
After achieving success in television, Liu then ventured onto the big screen. In 2007, she joined William Morris Agency (WMA) and was subsequently cast in her first Hollywood production, The Forbidden Kingdom. She played Golden Sparrow, an orphan seeking revenge against her parents' killer. Thereafter, she starred in romantic-comedy Love in Disguise (2010) with Taiwanese-American singer and actor Wang Leehom.

In 2011, she starred in fantasy supernatural film A Chinese Ghost Story, adapted from Strange Stories from a Chinese Studio. The same year, she was cast as Wu Qing (Emotionless) in Gordon Chan's wuxia film The Four, adapted from Woon Swee Oan's novel series The Four Great Constables. She subsequently reprised her role in two other installments of the film series.

Liu won the Best Actress award at the fifth Macau International Movie Festival for her role as Lingju and Diaochan in the historical film The Assassins (2012).

=== 2014–present: International collaborations and television comeback ===
In 2014, Liu collaborated with Korean actor-singer Rain for the romance film For Love or Money, based on Hong Kong novelist Amy Cheung's 2006 novel of the same name. Though it did reasonably well at the box office, the film was criticized for its storyline and production.

Liu starred in The Third Way of Love (2015). Her performance in the film led to her win for the Most Anticipated Actress award at the 16th Chinese Film Media Awards. The same year, she was named the first Chinese ambassador of Dior Prestige and became the global ambassador of Tissot.

I made a Xixi [Liu Yifei] film festival for myself, and saw her works have the shock moments in her performance. That convinced me that she would be perfect for the part [leading actress in "The Chinese Widow"]. When you have two actors like Xixi and Emile, you know they are so intelligent and so clever and so talented...

— Academy Award-winning director Bille August

In 2016, Liu starred in romance film Night Peacock, a Chinese-France co-production directed by Dai Sijie. She then starred in the youth romance film So Young 2: Never Gone.

In 2017, Liu starred in romantic fantasy film Once Upon a Time by award-winning director Anthony LaMolinara and Zhao Xiaoding. She also starred in the historical film The Chinese Widow directed by Bille August. The film premiered at the Shanghai International Film Festival as the opening film, and Liu was nominated as Best Actress. The same year, Liu reunited with White Vengeance co-star Feng Shaofeng in the fantasy comedy film Hanson and the Beast.

In November 2017, Liu was cast as Mulan in the live-action adaptation of the 1998 Disney animated film, which was released in 2020 to mixed reviews.

In December 2017, it was announced that Liu would star in the upcoming fantasy mystery television series, The Love of Hypnosis. This marked her first small-screen comeback in 12 years.

In 2022, she won the Best Actress Award at the 13th Macau International Television Festival for her role as Zhao Paner in the costume drama "Meng Hua Lu"(梦华录).

=== Music ===
Liu signed with Sony Music Entertainment Japan in 2005. She released her first Japanese single "Mayonaka no Door" with Sony Music on July 19, 2006. Her debut album Liu was released the next month in various parts of Asia such as mainland China, Hong Kong and throughout Southeast Asia, featuring a diverse music repertoire including rap and soft rock. In the same year, Liu also released her Japanese album in which the single, "Mayonaka no Door" was chosen to be an ending theme for the anime series Demashita! Powerpuff Girls Z by TV Tokyo.

In 2020, she performed the Mandarin and English version of the song "Reflection" for the live-action Mulan.

== Politics ==
In August 2019, Liu reshared an image posted by Chinese newspaper People's Daily, an official newspaper of the Central Committee of the Chinese Communist Party, during the 2019–2020 Hong Kong protests. The image quoted Fu Guohao, a Global Times journalist who had been searched, tied up, and beaten by protestors at the Hong Kong International Airport. His statement during the attack, "I support the Hong Kong police; you can beat me now" had become a viral expression of pro-establishment support. The image Liu reshared included Fu's quote and the phrase "What a shame for Hong Kong". This sparked international controversy, with Liu being accused of supporting police brutality. Following this, the hashtag #BoycottMulan started trending supporting a boycott of the movie. In response to the controversy, Liu was not present at the 2019 D23 Expo, which gave fans an exclusive sneak peek of Mulan. When asked about the controversy in February 2020, Liu stated: "I think it's just a very sensitive situation."

During an interview with Variety magazine at the premiere of Mulan on March 10, 2020, Liu described herself as "Asian" instead of "Chinese", which caused anger among some Chinese social media netizens, who threatened to boycott the movie and accused her of forgetting her roots. They also questioned why a non-Chinese national was playing the "legendary Chinese icon".

In March 2021, Liu cut ties with clothing brand Adidas over its support for the Better Cotton Initiative, an industry group that promotes sustainable cotton, after the trade body pulled out of Xinjiang, China citing concerns of forced labour involving Uyghur Muslims.

== Personal life ==
Liu is notably free of romantic gossip. Her only publicly known boyfriend was South Korean actor Song Seung-heon, with whom she collaborated on the film The Third Way of Love. In August 2015, shortly before the film's release in China, photos of the two on a date were revealed, and they soon admitted they were "dating with the intention of marriage." The couple reportedly split in late 2017, with Liu confirming their break-up in January 2018.

== Filmography ==
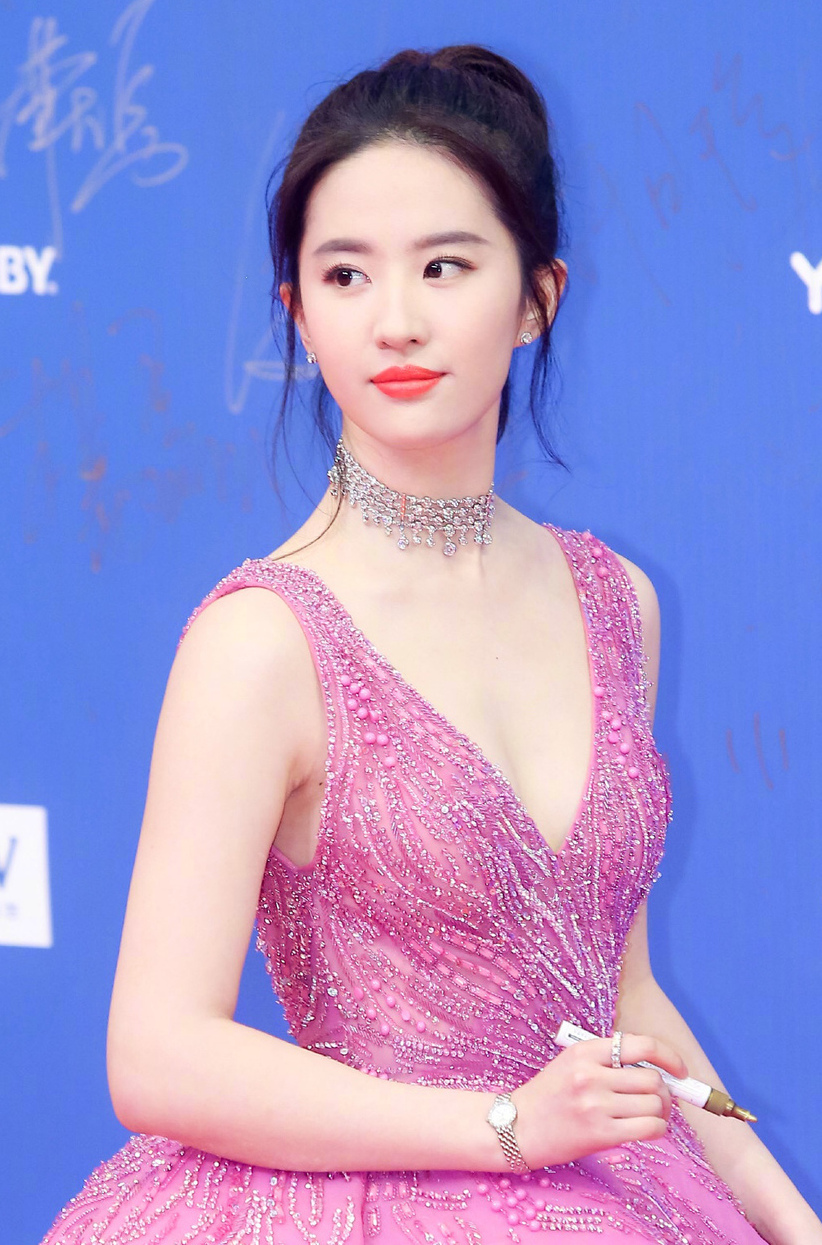
Liu at the 7th Beijing International Film Festival, 2017

=== Film ===
Year	Title	Role	Notes
2004	Love of May	Zhao Xuan	
2004	The Love Winner	Jin Qiaoli	
2006	Abao's Story	Xixi	Cameo
2008	The Forbidden Kingdom	Golden Sparrow	
2010	Love in Disguise	Song Xiaoqing	
2011	A Chinese Fairy Tale	Nie Xiaoqian	
2011	White Vengeance	Consort Yu	
2012	The Four	Wu Qing	
2012	The Assassins	Lingju / Diaochan	
2013	The Four II	Wu Qing	
2014	The Four III	Wu Qing	
2014	For Love or Money	Xing Lu	
2015	Outcast	Zhao Lian	
2015	The Third Way of Love	Zou Yu	
2016	Night Peacock	Elsa	
2016	So Young 2: Never Gone	Su Yunjin	
2017	Once Upon a Time	Bai Qian / Si Yin / Su Su	
2017	The Chinese Widow	Ying	
2017	Hanson and the Beast	Bai Xianchu	
2020	Mulan	Hua Mulan	

=== Television series ===
Year	Title	Role	Notes
2003	The Story of a Noble Family	Bai Xiuzhu	
2003	Demi-Gods and Semi-Devils	Wang Yuyan	
2005	Chinese Paladin	Zhao Ling'er	
2005	Doukou Nianhua	Xiao Zhao	Cameo
2006	The Return of the Condor Heroes	Xiaolongnü	
2020	The Love of Hypnosis	Lu Mansheng	
2022	A Dream of Splendor	Zhao Paner	
2023	Meet Yourself	Xu Hongdou	
2024	The Tale of Rose	Huang Yimei	

== Discography ==
=== Albums ===
Album information	Track list	Notes
Title: Liu; Label: Sony BMG Music Entertainment (Hong Kong) Limited; Release date: August 31, 2006	1. 泡芙女孩; 2. 就要我滋味; 3. 心悸; 4. 幸运草; 5. 放飞美丽; 6. 世界的秘密; 7. 一克拉的眼泪; 8. 做你的秒钟; 9. 毛毛雨; 10. 爱的延长赛	Chinese album
Title: All My Words; Label: Sony Music Entertainment Japan; Release date: September 6, 2006	1. 真夜中のドア; 2. 恋する週末; 3. HAPPINESS; 4. 愛のミナモト; 5. どこまでも ひろがる空に向かって; 6. テノヒラノカナタ; 7. My sunshiny day 8. 世界の秘密; 9. CLOSE TO ME; 10. 月の夜; 11. スピード; 12. Pieces of my words ～言の花～	Japanese album

=== Singles ===
Album information	Track list	Notes
Title: Mayonaka no Door; Label: Sony Music Entertainment Japan; Release date: July 19, 2006	1. 真夜中のドア; 2. brightly 3. 真夜中のドア (Instrumental); 4. brightly (Instrumental)	Japanese album

=== Soundtracks ===
Year	English title	Chinese title	Album	Notes
2006	I Want My Taste	我要我的滋味	—N/a	theme song for Yili milk
2011	Lan Ruo's Lyrics	兰若词	—N/a	theme song for video game A Chinese Ghost Story Online
2011	Song of Chu	楚歌	White Vengeance OST	with Feng Shaofeng
2012	Dreams Won't Die	梦不死	The Four OST	with Deng Chao, Ronald Cheng & Collin Chou
2012	Waiting For Snow	等雪来	The Assassins OST	with Chow Yun-fat
2013	Letting Go	放下	The Four II OST	
2016	Still Here	还在这里	So Young 2: Never Gone OST	with Reno Wang
2017	Three Lifetimes, Ten Miles of Peach Blossoms	三生三世十里桃花	Once Upon a Time OST	with Yang Yang
2020	Reflection	自己	Mulan (Original Motion Picture Soundtrack)	Liu also sung this song in English

== Awards and nominations ==
=== Film awards ===
Year	Award	Category	Nominated work	Result	Ref.
2013	5th Macau International Movie Festival	Best Actress	The Assassins	Won	
2016	16th Chinese Film Media Awards	Most Anticipated Actress	The Third Way of Love	Won	
2016	13th Guangzhou College Student Film Festival	Most Popular Actress	Night Peacock, Never Gone	Won	
2017	9th Macau International Movie Festival	Best Actress	Once Upon a Time	Nominated	
2021	1st Critics' Choice Super Awards	Best Actress in an Action Movie	Mulan	Nominated	
2021	34th Nickelodeon Kids' Choice Awards	Favorite Movie Actress	Mulan	Nominated	
2021	46th Saturn Awards	Best Actress	Mulan	Nominated	

=== Television awards ===
Year	Award	Category	Nominated work	Result	Ref.
2022	35th Huading Awards	Best Actress in the Top 100 Chinese TV series	A Dream of Splendor	Nominated	
2022	13th Macau International Television Festival	Best Actress	A Dream of Splendor	Won	
2023	3rd New Era International TV Festival Ammolite Awards	Best Ancient Costume Actress	A Dream of Splendor	Won	
2023	18th Seoul International Drama Awards	Best Actress	A Dream of Splendor	Nominated	
2023	1st Golden Panda Awards	Best Actress in Leading Role	A Dream of Splendor	Nominated	
2023	14th Macau International Television Festival	Best Actress	Meet Yourself	Won	
2024	2nd CMG Annual Chinese TV Drama Ceremony	Actress of the Year	Meet Yourself	Nominated	
2024	2024 Weibo Vision Conference	Actor of The Year	The Tale of Rose	Won	
2025	3rd CMG Annual Chinese TV Drama Ceremony	Actress of the Year	The Tale of Rose	Won	
2025	2025 Television Directors' Conference	Actress of The Year	The Tale of Rose	Won	
2025	30th Shanghai Television Festival	Best Actress	The Tale of Rose	Nominated	

=== Forbes China Celebrity 100 ===
Year	Rank	Ref.
2005	58th	
2006	51st	
2007	43rd	
2008	87th	
2009	43rd	
2010	66th	
2011	93rd	
2017	23rd	
2019	89th	
2020	30th	
