= Feng Shaofeng =

Chinese actor

- 冯绍峰
- Born: Feng Wei (冯威); Shanghai
- Other name: William Feng
- Education: Shanghai Theatre Academy
- Occupation: Actor
- Years active: 2001–present
- Agent: Huayi Brothers
- Spouse: Zhao Liying (m. 2018; div. 2021)
- Children: 1

Chinese name
- Traditional Chinese: 馮紹峰
- Simplified Chinese: 冯绍峰
Transcriptions
Standard Mandarin
- Hanyu Pinyin: Féng Shàofēng

Feng Shaofeng (Chinese: 冯绍峰), also known as William Feng, is a Chinese actor. Feng rose to fame with the time travel series Palace (2011). He is also known for his roles in TV series Prince of Lan Ling (2013), Ice Fantasy (2016), The Story of Minglan (2018), and in films Wolf Totem (2015), for which he won the Hundred Flowers Award for Best Actor, Tsui Hark's Detective Dee series and Cheang Pou-soi's The Monkey King series.

Feng ranked 33rd on the Forbes China Celebrity 100 list in 2012, 33rd on in 2013, 98th in 2015, 89th in 2017, and 88th in 2019.

== Early life and education ==
Feng Shaofeng was born Feng Wei in Shanghai as an only child. Influenced by his artistic mother, Feng began taking violin lessons and participating in various extracurricular activities when he was a child. Upon graduating from high school, he applied to the Shanghai Theater Academy and was accepted with scholarship.

== Career ==
=== Beginnings ===
Feng made his acting debut in 1998, and has appeared in several television series, including Boy & Girl, Wind and Cloud 2, Assassinator Jing Ke, Sigh of His Highness, and The Conquest.

Feng gained more attention after starring in a grand production drama by Hong Kong's TVB and mainland China's CCTV, The Drive of Life. He then starred in the period drama Yun Niang alongside Ady An and Leanne Liu, which placed number one in ratings upon its premiere on SMG. Feng reunited with Ady An in Four Women Conflicts, and his performance in the series won him the Audience's Most Favorite Actor award at Fujian TV Station's "I Love My Drama" award ceremony. In 2010, he played the role of Liu Zhang in Beauty's Rival in Palace.

=== Rise in popularity ===
Feng rose to mainstream popularity after starring in Palace (2011), one of the most popular Chinese dramas of the year. The same year, he starred in Daniel Lee's historical film White Vengeance where plays Xiang Yu, the powerful warlord. Feng's outstanding performance in the film led to him winning two awards - "Most Commercially Valuable Newcomer" and "Outstanding Performance" at the 2011 Harbin Film Festival.

Feng then starred in Painted Skin: The Resurrection (2012), a sequel to Gordon Chan's 2008 box office hit Painted Skin. He next starred alongside Fan Bingbing in Double Xposure, a romantic thriller directed by Li Yu.

In 2013, Feng starred as the titular prince in the historical drama Prince of Lan Ling. The series earned high ratings in Taiwan, breaking the record set by Three Kingdoms, and earned increased recognition for Feng in the region. The same year, he starred in the action film Young Detective Dee: Rise of the Sea Dragon directed by Tsui Hark. Feng was voted the Most Popular Actor award at the 2014 Beijing Student Film Festival.

=== Success in films and TV productions ===
In 2014, Feng starred alongside Tang Wei in The Golden Era directed by Ann Hui, which closed at the Venice International Film Festival. His portrayal of Xiao Jun, a left-wing author who is strong and not afraid to express his feelings, earned the praises of the director. Feng had requested not to be paid to support Ann, whom he has admired and wanted to work with her for many years. The same year, he starred in the road-trip comedy The Continent, directed by Han Han.

In 2015, Feng starred in the Chinese-French co-production Wolf Totem, adapted from Jiang Rong's 2004 best-selling novel by the same name. He plays a Chinese student who is sent to Inner Mongolia to teach shepherds and instead learns about the wolf population. Feng and co-star Shawn Dou bonded with the wolves by cleaning their cages and feeding them; and trained in horse-riding for their roles. The film earned Feng his first Best Actor trophy at the 33rd Hundred Flowers Awards. The same year, he was cast in the film adaptation of the best-selling novel, The Three-Body Problem.

Feng then played Xuanzang in The Monkey King 2, which was released in February 2016. The same year, he starred alongside Victoria Song in fantasy drama Ice Fantasy, adapted from Guo Jingming's novel of the same name as well as the Chinese remake of My Best Friend's Wedding.

Feng returned to television with another fantasy drama The Starry Night, The Starry Sea (2017) alongside Bea Hayden. The same year, he starred alongside Liu Yifei in the fantasy comedy film Hanson and the Beast.

In 2018, Feng played the male lead in historical drama The Story of Minglan. He reprised his roles as Tang Sanzang and Yuchi in the films The Monkey King 3 and Detective Dee: The Four Heavenly Kings respectively.

In 2022, he starred in wuxia film Song of the Assassins, which became a box office disappointment, and historical drama, The Imperial Age, portraying Yongle Emperor.

== Personal life ==
In May 2012, Feng announced his relationship with Ni Ni on Weibo; they parted ways after three years. In February 2016, Feng and Lin Yun were photographed together in Shanghai. Although neither of them confirmed the relationship, they were spotted on dates multiple times and reportedly broke up in January 2017.

On October 16, 2018, Feng announced his marriage to actress Zhao Liying. On March 8, 2019, he announced that their son was born. On April 23, 2021, Feng and Zhao announced their divorce.

== Filmography ==
=== Film ===
Year	English title	Chinese title	Role	Notes/Ref.
2004	Brush Up My Sisters	百分百刑警	Dan	
2006	Dragon Gate Station	龙门驿站之嚎月	Hou Feng	
2011	White Vengeance	鸿门宴	Xiang Yu	
2012	Painted Skin: The Resurrection	画皮2	Pang Lang	
2012	Double Xposure	二次曝光	Liu Dong	
2012	Threads of Time	柳如是	Chen Zilong	
2012	Tai Chi 0	太极之零開始	Chen Zaiyang	
2012	Tai Chi Hero	太极２ 英雄崛起	Chen Zaiyang	
2013	Young Detective Dee: Rise of the Sea Dragon	狄仁傑之神都龍王	Yuchi Zhenjin	
2013	Love Will Tear Us Apart	我想和你好好的	Jiang Liangliang	
2014	Snow Blossom	大寒桃花开	Da Han	filmed in 2004
2014	The Continent	后会无期	Han Dong	
2014	The Golden Era	黄金时代	Xiao Jun	
2014	One Day	有一天		
2015	Wolf Totem	狼图腾	Chen Zhen	
2015	Dragon Blade	天将雄师	Huo Qubing	Special appearance
2015	Bride Wars	新娘大作战	Priest	Cameo
2016	The Monkey King 2	西游记之三打白骨精	Tang Sanzang	
2016	The Bodyguard	特工爺爺	Doctor Hu	Cameo
2016	My Best Friend's Wedding	我最好朋友的婚礼	Li Ran	
2017	Hanson and the Beast	二代妖精	Yuan Shuai (Hanson)	
2017	Six Years, Six Days	六年，六天		
2018	The Monkey King 3	西遊記之女兒國	Tang Sanzang	
2018	Detective Dee: The Four Heavenly Kings	狄仁杰之四大天王	Yuchi Zhenjin	
2019	Pegasus	飞驰人生		Cameo
2022	Only Fools Rush In	四海		
2022	Ordinary Hero	平凡英雄	Lin Li	
TBA	The Three-Body Problem	三体	Wang Lin	
TBA	Song of the Assassins	刺局	Qi Junyuan	
2026	Love Test	试探	Ding Boyang	

=== Television series ===
Year	English title	Chinese title	Role	Notes/Ref.
1998		少年徐悲鸿	Xu Beihong	
1998		星星串	Wen Jun	
1998		浦东歌谣	Red Guard	
2000		商城没有夜晚	Bai Ling	
2000	Actually Don't Want to Go	其实不想走	Shen Jiaju	
2001	Rising	崛起	Li Jinsong	
2001	Father Goes Forward	老爸向前冲	Chen Mingyuan	
2001	Love Password	爱情密码	Hao Lei	
2002	Illusion	镜花水月	Ren Weijian	
2002	Boy & Girl	男才女貌	Yin Shan	
2003	Wind and Cloud 2	风云2	Huaikong	
2004	First Lover	初恋情人	Fang Zhenwen	
2004	Assassinator Jing Ke	荆轲传奇	Crown Prince Dan of Yan	
2004	The Legend of Hero	中华英雄	Li Qianjun	
2004	First Kind of Crisis	第一种危机	Tong Gang	
2005	Sigh of His Highness	一生为奴	Ronglu	
2006	The Conquest	争霸传奇	Crown Prince You	
2006	Deep Night	夜深沉	Song Xinsheng	
2007	The Drive of Life	岁月风云	Wah Chun-man	
2007	Special Policewoman	非常女警	Han Yue	
2008	Yun Niang	芸娘	Lu Haozhong	
2008	Women's Flowers	女人花	Wu Yusheng	
2008	One Thousand Teardrops	一千滴眼泪	Meng Shaobai	
2008	Rose Martial World	玫瑰江湖	Cen Yetong	
2009	Traveling to Tiger Mountain	再向虎山行	Rong Kuan	
2009	Four Women Conflict	锁清秋	Shen Chaozong	
2009	The Diamond Family	钻石豪门	Shi Junchao	
2009	A Husband and Wife	夫妻一场	Qiu Li	
2010	Ghost Catcher - Legend of Beauty	天师钟馗之美丽传说之美丽之罪	Huang Bingcheng	
2010	Beauty's Rival in Palace	美人心计	Liu Zhang	
2010	The Girl in Blue	佳期如梦	Meng Heping	
2010	Horizon True Heart	天涯赤子心	Zheng Shixian	
2011	My Daughter	夏家三千金	Zheng Yunhai	
2011	Journey to the West	西游记	Erlang Shen	
2011	Palace	宫	Yinsi	
2011	The Emperor's Harem	后宫	Yang Yong	
2011	Symphony of Fate	命运交响曲	Liu Chenxi	
2012	Legend of the Military Seal	虎符传奇	Lord Xinling	
2012	Beijing Love Story	小城大爱	Ouyang Yifei	
2013	Prince of Lan Ling	兰陵王	Gao Changgong (Prince of Lanling)	also producer
2016	Ice Fantasy	幻城	Ka Suo	also producer
2017	The Starry Night, The Starry Sea	那片星空那片海	Wu Julan	
2017	Ice Fantasy Destiny	幻城凡世	Feng Suo	
2017	The Starry Night, The Starry Sea II	那片星空那片海2	Wu Julan	
2018	The Story of Minglan	知否？知否？应是绿肥红瘦	Gu Tingye	
2020	Great Age	大时代	Kuang Mingchou	
2022	Shining Just for You	星河长明	Yu Xiuming	
TBA	Wisher	致命愿望	Na Duo	

== Discography ==
Year	English title	Chinese title	Album	Notes
2002	"Moon Flower"	月亮花	The Love Story in the Fantasyland OST	
2011	"My Only Lover"	唯一的恋人	—N/a	
2012	"Song of Chu"	楚歌	White Vengeance OST	with Liu Yifei
2012	"A Hundred Years of Revolution"	百年轮回	—N/a	Theme song for Fantasy Zhu Xian 2

== Awards and nominations ==
Year	Awards	Category	Nominated work	Result
2011	24th Harbin Film Festival	Most Commercially Valuable Newcomer	White Vengeance	Won
2011	24th Harbin Film Festival	Outstanding Performance	White Vengeance	Won
2012	12th Chinese Film Media Awards	Most Anticipated Actor	White Vengeance	Nominated
2013	13th Chinese Film Media Awards	Most Anticipated Actor	Double Xposure	Nominated
2013	10th Huading Awards	Best Actor	Prince of Lan Ling	Nominated
2014	12th Huading Awards	Best Actor (Mainland China)	Young Detective Dee: Rise of the Sea Dragon	Nominated
2014	21st Beijing Student Film Festival	Most Popular Actor	Young Detective Dee: Rise of the Sea Dragon	Won
2014	14th Chinese Film Media Awards	Most Anticipated Actor	Young Detective Dee: Rise of the Sea Dragon	Nominated
2015	22nd Beijing Student Film Festival	Best Actor	The Golden Era	Nominated
2015	33rd Hundred Flowers Awards	Best Actor	Wolf Totem	Won
2019	26th Huading Awards	Best Actor (Historical drama)	The Story of Minglan	Nominated
2019	Golden Bud - The Fourth Network Film And Television Festival	Best Actor	The Story of Minglan, Great Age	Nominated
