= Balzac and the Little Chinese Seamstress (film) =

- Theatrical release poster
- Directed by: Dai Sijie
- Written by: Dai Sijie; Nadine Perront; Dai Sijie (novel)
- Produced by: Lise Fayolle
- Starring: Zhou Xun; Liu Ye; Chen Kun
- Cinematography: Jean-Marie Dreujou
- Edited by: Luc Barnier; Julia Grégory
- Music by: Wang Pujian
- Distributed by: Empire Pictures (United States)
- Release date: 16 May 2002 (France)
- Running time: 111 minutes
- Countries: China; France
- Language: Mandarin

Balzac and the Little Chinese Seamstress (simplified Chinese: 巴尔扎克与小裁缝; traditional Chinese: 巴爾扎克與小裁縫; French: Balzac et la Petite Tailleuse Chinoise) is a 2002 Franco-Chinese romance drama film with dialogue in the Sichuan dialect directed by Dai Sijie and starring Zhou Xun, Chen Kun and Liu Ye. It premiered at the 2002 Cannes Film Festival on 16 May.

Based on the 2000 semi-autobiographical novel of the same title by Dai, the film revolves around two young Chinese boys of bourgeois background who were sent to a remote village in Sichuan province for three years of re-education during the Cultural Revolution. They both fell in love with a beautiful local girl, granddaughter of an old tailor and known to everyone as the Little Seamstress. During those years of intellectual oppression, the three found solace and liberation in a collection of banned translated novels by Western authors, among whom their favourite was Balzac. The film explores the themes of youth, love, and freedom in those dark times in China.

== Plot ==
The film is set in a period between 1971 and 1974, during the later stage of the Chinese Cultural Revolution. Two city boys in their late teenage years, Luo Min (played by Chen Kun) and Ma Jianling (Liu Ye), are on their way to a remote village in the mountainous Sichuan province for re-education. Upon arrival, the boys are questioned on their "reactionary backgrounds" by the Chief (Wang Shuangbao), the village leader, in the presence of the other villagers. Luo's father turns out to be a dentist who had once fitted a false tooth for Chiang Kai-shek, while Ma's father is a doctor. The Chief also examines the boys' luggage and burns a cookbook, which he claims to be bourgeois. He is about to throw Ma's violin into the fire as well before he is stopped by Luo, who lies that the Mozart's Divertimento KV 334 Ma plays is a "mountain song" titled Mozart is Thinking of Chairman Mao.

The two boys are allocated a house and immediately join in the labours of the locals, which include transporting buckets of human waste used for fertilizer as well as working in the coal mine. One day, a young girl, granddaughter of a tailor from the neighbouring village and known to everyone as the Little Seamstress (Zhou Xun), comes by with her grandfather to listen to Ma play violin. Luo and Ma befriend the Little Seamstress and soon both fall in love with her. The girl, illiterate but hungry for knowledge, and the boys, vowing to transform her, devise a plan to steal a suitcase filled with banned translated Western novels from Four-Eyes (Wang Hongwei), another boy undergoing re-education in the village but bound to return to the city. Luo begins to read to the Little Seamstress every day, books including those by Stendhal, Kipling and Dostoevsky. But her favourite turns out to be Balzac.

The Little Seamstress soon falls in love with Luo. One day, as Luo is departing for the city on a two-month leave to visit his sick father, she tells him that she has a problem but does not elaborate. She later confides to Ma that she is pregnant, but population-curbing laws forbid marriage before 25 and abortion is illegal without a marriage certificate. Ma travels to the city to find a gynecologist who knows his father and begs the latter for help. The gynecologist is moved and agrees to travel to the village to perform a secret abortion. Upon Luo's return, life resumes as before.

One day, however, the Little Seamstress, now completely changed by the new ideas Luo and Ma have introduced her to, abruptly decides to leave the village to seek out "a new life," despite pleas from her grandfather and Luo. Later, in 1974, Luo and Ma both return to the city as well. Luo later becomes a professor in a dental institute in Shanghai, while Ma moves to France and becomes a professional violinist. In the late 1990s, when he sees on the news that the construction of the Three Gorges Dam will soon flood the village he spent three years in, Ma travels back in the hope of finding the Little Seamstress again. However, his efforts are futile and he brings back only a video recording of the village and the people, including the now aged Chief. As Ma meets up with his old friend Luo in Shanghai, the latter confesses an earlier failed attempt to search for the Little Seamstress in Shenzhen and Hong Kong. The film ends with a news clip of the flooded towns and villages and a scene of the three, back to their youth years, also submerged in water.

== Cast ==
- Zhou Xun as Little Seamstress, a beautiful and illiterate village girl, granddaughter of a tailor
- Liu Ye as Ma Jianling, a city boy of bourgeois background sent to a remote village for re-education during the Cultural Revolution
- Chen Kun as Luo Min, boy in the same situation as Ma, close friend of Ma and lover of the Little Seamstress
- Wang Shuangbao as Chief, leader of the village
- Wang Hongwei as Four-Eyes, a boy in similar situation as Ma and Luo who appears to embrace Mao's teachings wholeheartedly

== Awards and nominations ==
- Golden Globes, 2003
  - Best Foreign Language Film (nominated)
- Istanbul International Film Festival, 2003
  - Golden Tulip (nominated)
- Golden Horse Film Festival, 2003
  - Best Screenplay Adaptation (nominated)
- Hong Kong Film Awards, 2004
  - Best Asian Film (nominated)

== DVD release ==
Balzac and the Little Chinese Seamstress was released on DVD on 29 November 2005 in the United States and distributed by Empire Pictures.

== See also ==
- Chinese Cultural Revolution
