= Hanson and the Beast =

- Poster
- Hanyu Pinyin: Èr Dài Yāo Jīng Zhī Jīn Shēng Yǒu Xìng
- Directed by: Xiao Yang
- Written by: Xiao Yang; Guo Yiwen
- Produced by: Chen Kuo-fu
- Starring: Feng Shaofeng; Liu Yifei
- Release date: 29 December 2017
- Running time: 1h 50m
- Country: China
- Language: Mandarin
- Budget: $6.7 million + $7 million re-release

Hanson and the Beast (Chinese: 二代妖精之今生有幸) is a 2017 Chinese fantasy comedy film starring Feng Shaofeng and Liu Yifei.

== Plot ==
Yuan Shuai, a debt-ridden animal-breeder, tries to get out of his financial predicament by finding a wealthy girlfriend through matchmaking dates. He unexpectedly meets and falls in love with a fox demon, Bai Xianchu, who he saved as a child. However, the head of the Demon tribe Yun Zhonghe forbids love relationships between demons and humans, so he takes Bai Xianchu away. To seek his lover, Yuan Shuai bravely crashes into the demonic world.

== Cast ==
- Feng Shaofeng as Yuan Shuai/Hansen - a lonely man who owes a group of thugs a large sum of money due to his movie being unsuccessful. He is thus forced to work and live at a zoo, while in the meantime attempting to find a rich woman to help settle his debt. He later falls in love with Bai Xianchu, but she is forcefully taken away by the Bureau of Transfiguration. Yuan Shuai realizes that she is everything to him, so he courageously goes to her rescue.
- Liu Yifei as Bai Xianchu - an Arctic Silver Fox demon. Her dealings with Hansen lead her into a lot of trouble with the Bureau of Transfiguration, as marrying a human is considered severe felony in the demon world. She loves Yuan Shuai dearly and is willing to sacrifice anything for him.
- Li Guanjie as Yun Zhonghe - Commissioner of the Bureau of Transfiguration. He's the main antagonist.
- Guo Jingfei as Hong Sicong - Chief of Human World Branch of the Bureau of Transfiguration.

== Soundtrack ==
No.	Title	Lyrics	Music	Performed by	Length
1.	"Night Monster 夜来妖" (theme song)	Li Jinguang, Yang Xiao, Edison Chen	Li Jinguang	Edison Chen	3:14
2.	"Fans 粉丝" (ending theme)	Yang Xiao	Key.L, Zheng Nan	Rene Liu	4:37
3.	"Fox 狐狸" (promotional song)	Joker Xue	Zhou Yili	Joker Xue	3:54
