= The Assassins (film) =

- Film poster

Chinese name
- Traditional Chinese: 銅雀臺
- Simplified Chinese: 铜雀台
Transcriptions
Standard Mandarin
- Hanyu Pinyin: Tóng Què Tái
- Directed by: Zhao Linshan
- Written by: Wang Bin
- Produced by: Zhao Xiaoding
- Starring: Chow Yun-fat; Liu Yifei; Hiroshi Tamaki; Alec Su; Annie Yi; Qiu Xinzhi; Yao Lu; Ni Dahong
- Cinematography: Zhao Xiaoding
- Edited by: Cheng Long
- Music by: Mei Linmao; Lin Maoqing
- Production companies: Changchun Film Studio; My Way Film Company Limited; Beijing Enlight Pictures
- Release date: 26 September 2012
- Running time: 107 minutes
- Country: China
- Language: Mandarin

The Assassins, previously known as Bronze Sparrow Terrace or Bronze Sparrow Platform, is a Chinese historical drama film directed by Zhao Linshan, starring Chow Yun-fat as Cao Cao, a prominent warlord who became the de facto head of the central government in China towards the end of the Han dynasty. The film, released in October 2012, focuses on Cao Cao's life in his later years and depicts two assassination attempts on the warlord. The supporting cast includes Liu Yifei, Hiroshi Tamaki, Alec Su, Annie Yi, Qiu Xinzhi, Yao Lu and Ni Dahong. The film's Chinese title is a reference to the Bronze Bird Terrace, a terrace constructed in 210 by Cao Cao in the ancient city of Ye (in present-day Handan, Hebei).

== Plot ==
The film is set in China in the late 210s – the years preceding the end of the Han dynasty. Over a period of two decades, Cao Cao had defeated Lü Bu and other rival warlords to gain supremacy in northern and central China. In 216, he is granted the title of a vassal king, the "King of Wei", by Emperor Xian, the figurehead Han ruler controlled by him. He constructs the Bronze Sparrow Platform as a showcase of his power.

Lingju is the orphaned daughter of Lü Bu and Diaochan. She, like many other orphaned children of Cao Cao's enemies, was recruited in her childhood by Cao Cao's rivals to be trained as assassins to kill Cao. She meets Mu Shun, who protects her while she is in training and falls in love with him. Mu Shun is castrated and Lingju and Mu Shun eventually find their way into court life: Lingju is taken by Cao Cao as one of his mistresses while Mu Shun becomes a palace eunuch.

There are two major attempts on Cao Cao's life. The first is masterminded by Empress Fu Shou and her father Fu Wan. This plan fails and Cao Cao has the conspirators – including the empress – executed in front of Emperor Xian. The second is a revolt led by the imperial physician Ji Ben and his supporters, but the rebellion is swiftly crushed. Cao Cao suspects that his son, Cao Pi, is involved in the assassination plots.

Mu Shun fails in his attempt to kill Cao Cao, who reveals that he knew all along that Lingju is planning to assassinate him. Cao Cao promises to spare Lingju's life. In return, Mu Shun disguises himself as Cao Cao and rides out of the city, only to be mortally wounded by Lingju, who mistakes him for Cao and stabs him with her father's weapon. Lingju then commits suicide to join Mu Shun.

== Cast ==
- Chow Yun-fat as Cao Cao
- Liu Yifei as Lingju / Diaochan
  - Zhang Zimu as Lingju (young)
- Hiroshi Tamaki as Mu Shun
  - Liu Jieyi as Mu Shun (young)
- Alec Su as Emperor Xian of Han
- Annie Yi as Empress Fu Shou
- Qiu Xinzhi as Cao Pi
- Yao Lu as Ji Ben
- Ni Dahong as Fu Wan
- Chi Cheng as Xu Chu
- Qu Quancheng as Cao Zhi
- Bao Jianfeng as Lü Bu
- Samuel Pang as Cao Xiu
- Guo Jinfei as Chen Meng
- Tian Ruihui as Mu Yan

== Reception ==
The film premiered at the 11th Changchun Film Festival and impressed audiences with its accuracy and attention to historical details, both in terms of story and costumes.

== See also ==
- List of media adaptations of Romance of the Three Kingdoms
