= Amy Cheung (writer) =

Hong Kong writer

- Born: 3 November 1967 (age 58); Hong Kong
- Education: Hong Kong Baptist College
- Occupations: Author, novelist, essayist, magazine founder
- Writing career
- Genres: Fiction, essays
- Subjects: Love and relationships
- Literary movement: Women's fiction, chick lit, romance

Amy Cheung
- Traditional Chinese: 張小嫻
- Simplified Chinese: 张小娴
Transcriptions
Standard Mandarin
- Hanyu Pinyin: Zhāng Xiǎo Xián
Yue: Cantonese
- Jyutping: zoeng1 siu2 haan4

Amy Siu-haan Cheung (Chinese: 張小嫻; born November 3, 1967) is a Hong Kong writer who is known for her books on love and relationships. Her first novel, Women on the Breadfruit Tree, appeared in serialized form in the daily newspaper Ming Pao. She has written more than forty books, including novels and essay collections. She was named one of the 10 richest Chinese authors in 2013, as well as one of the 10 most influential microbloggers on Sina Weibo, with more than 64 million followers.

== Biography ==
Cheung was born in Hong Kong. She attended Hong Kong Baptist College, during which time she worked part-time as a scenarist and on the administrative staff of a TV station.

Her first novel, Women on the Breadfruit Tree, was published in 1995, and as of 2014, Cheung has written more than 40 novels, most of which are in the romance genre. Her works have appeared in numerous newspapers and magazines over the past two decades, particularly in the Hong Kong newspaper Apple Daily. Cheung also founded the magazine Amy in 1998.

== Works ==
Cheung's books are described as romance or chick lit, though their endings are often bittersweet or tragic. Many of her books depict relationships strained by social conventions or taboos that are characteristic of Chinese culture.

In Hummingbirds Fly Backwards, a young woman who is the manager of a lingerie shop has an affair with a married man who will not leave his wife due to the stigma of divorce. The book is popular for its portrayal of the pressures felt by unmarried women in their late twenties or older, known as xing nu ("blooming women") in Hong Kong but socially stigmatized and referred to as sheng nu ("leftover women") in mainland China, where marriage rates are as high as over 90 percent for women aged 35. The original Cantonese title (Three A-Cup Women) is a tongue-in-cheek play on the term "A-quality women." A Chinglish pun that can be understood by locals in Hong Kong, "A-Cup" refers to the characters' bra cup sizes and sounds identical to "A級" (Jyutping: kap1), or "A-quality," a term used to describe desirable women who are considered "the total package."

In For Love or Money, a mother from a well-to-do family hatches a plot to manipulate her son into abandoning his dreams of becoming an artist and joining the family business. In 2014, the novel was made into the film For Love or Money, starring Liu Yifei, Rain, and Joan Chen.

== Publications ==
Novels

- Hummingbirds Fly Backwards (English translation, 2016; original title: 《三個A CUP的女人》, 1995; 《我這輩子有過你》 )
- Never, Ever Say Goodbye (original title:《永不永不說再見》)
- Women on the Breadfruit Tree (original title:《麵包樹上的女人》)
- For Love or Money (original title: 《紅顏露水》)

Essays

- Thank You for Leaving Me (original title:《謝謝你離開我》)
- "The Distance between Friends"
- "Be Afraid to Believe"
- "Don't Believe Prince"
- "The Hidden Love"
