= Never Gone (film) =

So Young 2: Never Gone
- Poster
- Traditional Chinese: 致青春：原來你還在這裡
- Simplified Chinese: 致青春：原来你还在这里
- Hanyu Pinyin: Zhì Qīng Chūn: Yuán Lái Nǐ Hái Zài Zhè Lǐ
- Directed by: Zhou Tuo Ru
- Written by: Zhou Tuo Ru; Xin Yi Wu
- Produced by: Ke Liming; Zhang Yibai; Brantley Gong; Christy Wang
- Starring: Kris Wu; Liu Yifei
- Cinematography: Li Qiang; Zhao Xiaoshi
- Edited by: Yu Hongchao; Dave Sakamoto
- Production company: Beijing Ruyi Xinxin Film Investment
- Distributed by: Beijing Weiying Shidai Technology; Wuzhou Film Distribution; Huaxia Film Distribution
- Release date: 8 July 2016
- Running time: 98 minutes
- Country: China
- Language: Mandarin
- Box office: US$50.2 million

So Young 2: Never Gone (simplified Chinese: 致青春：原来你还在这里; traditional Chinese: 致青春：原來你還在這裡), commonly known as Never Gone, is a 2016 Chinese romantic drama film based on the popular novel by Xin Yiwu. The film is directed by Zhou Tuoru, produced by Zhang Yibai and stars Kris Wu and Liu Yifei. Though the stories are unrelated, the film was promoted as the sequel to 2013 youth romance film So Young, and released in China on 8 July 2016.

== Plot ==
Su Yunjin (Liu Yifei) and Cheng Zheng (Kris Wu) meet in high school. Su Yunjin is a transfer student from a struggling family, while rich heir Cheng Zheng is the popular star student. Cheng Zheng falls in love with Su Yunjin and pursues her through college, even when they study and live in different cities. Su Yunjin is worried about the difference in their economic status, though this doesn't worry Cheng Zheng. She decides to give it a chance and the two move in together after graduation.

Two years pass in bliss; however, the issue of money drives a wedge between them, as Su Yunjin refuses to take Cheng Zheng's financial help for her mother's operation, and Cheng Zheng is angered when she goes instead to her close friend and former suitor Shen Ju An (Kimi Qiao) for help. The two break up, and Cheng Zheng moves to America to help with his family's company.

After some more time passes, Su Yunjin realizes she truly loves Cheng Zheng and surprisingly, for the first time, she is the one to seek out Cheng Zheng rather than the other way around.

== Cast ==
- Kris Wu as Cheng Zheng
- Liu Yifei as Su Yunjin
- Kimi Qiao as Shen Ju'an
- Li Meng as Mo Yuhua
- Jin Shijia as Zhou Ziyi
- Li Qin as Meng Xue
- Hao Shaowen as Song Ming

== Reception ==
The film topped the country's box office charts, raking in 70 million yuan (S$14.1 million) on the first day. It grossed CN¥336.6 million in China and US$50.2 million worldwide.

It received negative reviews, particularly for its lack of substantial plot, poor characterization and the lead actors' performance. The Hollywood Reporter called the film a "clunky, retrograde imitation of that coming-of-age exploration of romance and the folly of youth".
