= White Vengeance =

2011 Chinese-Hong Kong film by Daniel Lee

- Hong Kong poster
- 鸿门宴
- Directed by: Daniel Lee
- Written by: Daniel Lee
- Produced by: Susanna Tsang
- Starring: Leon Lai; Feng Shaofeng; Liu Yifei; Zhang Hanyu; Jordan Chan; Andy On; Anthony Wong
- Cinematography: Tony Cheung
- Edited by: Tang Man-to
- Music by: Henry Lai
- Production company: Beijing Starlight International Media
- Distributed by: Mei Ah Entertainment
- Release date: 29 November 2011
- Running time: 135 minutes
- Countries: China; Hong Kong
- Language: Mandarin
- Box office: 160 million yuan (China)

White Vengeance (鸿门宴) is a 2011 historical drama film written and directed by Daniel Lee, starring Leon Lai, Feng Shaofeng, Liu Yifei, Zhang Hanyu, Jordan Chan, Andy On, and Anthony Wong. A Chinese—Hong Kong co-production, the film is loosely based on the events of the Chu–Han Contention, an interregnum between the fall of the Qin dynasty and the founding of the Han dynasty in Chinese history. The film's Chinese title is a reference to the Feast at Hong Gate, a significant event of that era.

== Synopsis ==
The film is set in China during the late 3rd century BC when rebellions have erupted throughout China to overthrow the oppressive Qin Empire. Among the rebels, two leading figures emerge: Xiang Yu and Liu Bang. Both men pay nominal allegiance to King Huai II, the figurehead ruler of the resurgent state of Chu.

King Huai II tries to pit Xiang Yu and Liu Bang against each other to prevent either from posing a threat to himself. Xiang Yu leads the rebels to a decisive victory over Qin forces at the Battle of Julu, while Liu Bang leads his followers to capture the Qin capital Xianyang, thereby ending the Qin Empire.

After the fall of the Qin Empire, tensions rise between Xiang Yu and Liu Bang as both men hope to seize the Mandate of Heaven and become the next emperor. A power struggle, historically known as the Chu–Han Contention, thus breaks out between them.

== Cast ==
- Leon Lai as Liu Bang
- Feng Shaofeng as Xiang Yu
- Liu Yifei as Consort Yu
- Zhang Hanyu as Zhang Liang
- Anthony Wong as Fan Zeng
- Jordan Chan as Fan Kuai
- Andy On as Han Xin
- Xiu Qing as Xiao He
- Jia Qing as an assassin
- Ding Haifeng as Xiang Zhuang
- Zhao Huinan as King Huai II of Chu
- Sun Wenting, Meng Tongdi and Huang Ziqi as the Nangong sisters
- Du Yiheng as an assassin
- Wu Ma as the Grand Tutor
- Chen Kuan-tai as the bearded warrior
- Chen Zhihui as Xiahou Ying
- Xu Xiangdong as Xiang Bo
- Du Yuming as Long Ju
- Zhao Wenhao as Bofu
