= The Chinese Widow =

2017 film by Bille August

- Theatrical release poster
- Chinese: 烽火芳菲
- Directed by: Bille August
- Written by: Greg Latter; Mabel Cheung
- Produced by: Peng Sun
- Starring: Liu Yifei; Emile Hirsch
- Cinematography: Filip Zumbrunn
- Edited by: Gerd Tjur
- Music by: Annette Focks
- Production company: Zhejiang Roc Pictures
- Release dates: 19 June 2017 (SIFF); 10 November 2017
- Running time: 97 minutes
- Country: China
- Language: Mandarin

The Chinese Widow (Chinese: 烽火芳菲), also known as In Harm's Way and The Hidden Soldier, is a 2017 Chinese war drama film directed by Danish director Bille August, starring Liu Yifei and Emile Hirsch. The film premiered at the 2017 Shanghai International Film Festival as the opening film and was released on 10 November 2017 in mainland China.

== Plot ==
Jack is a United States Army Air Forces pilot assigned to carry out the first US bombing run on Tokyo. After the mission succeeds, his plane is separated from the rest of the squadron due to bad weather. Running on low fuel, he is forced to fly towards China's Zhejiang Province. Due to a malfunctioning autopilot, he is forced to fly the plane manually while his crew parachutes out and he jumps out in the last moment before the plane crashes.

The next day, his unconscious body is discovered by a local widow named Ying, who lives with her daughter Nunu weaving silk. She hides him in a nearby cave with the help of her childhood friend and village head, Kai. Soon after, the Imperial Japanese Army (IJA), who have already captured and executed the rest of Jack's crew, come in search of Jack and capture the village. They hold Kai at gunpoint, demanding to know where the pilot is hiding. Kai refuses to do so and is executed. Nunu urges Ying to tell her grandparents, but Ying does not, remembering Kai's advice not to tell anyone. The next day, she goes to the cave with some food and, seeing Jack conscious, leaves it there and returns before he can confront her.

The Japanese army sends search patrols in the jungle and Ying is forced to bring Jack into her house. Although distant at first, Jack quickly befriends Nunu by whistling Yankee Doodle to her. Jack is able to convey to Ying that he has to go to Chongqing where the US Army base is. She hides him in the basement, while she tries to find a way to contact the Chinese guerrillas to get him a safe passage. One day, while Nunu is in her school, the IJA Captain Shimamoto comes into Ying's house and attempts to rape her, only to be shot in the head by Jack. They hide the body in the basement and, as Jack consoles Ying, they form an intimate bond.

In school, Nunu accidentally whistles Yankee Doodle which is noticed by her teacher. The teacher then rushes to Ying's house with Nunu and on confronting Jack, reveals that he is with the Chinese guerrillas. When Jack shows him the captain's body, he tells Ying and Nunu to escape along with Jack, as the IJA will execute them once they find out. While they make their escape, the IJA find the body and pursue the group after torching the village. The Japanese eventually catch up and fire on them; the teacher stays behind with a few guerrillas to slow them down, and is killed. With the group only a few metres away from the escape boat, Ying is shot in the chest by a sniper. Devastated, Jack kills the sniper and barely escapes with Nunu and the remaining guerrillas.

In Chongqing, he reports to General Jimmy Doolittle, also expressing his wish to adopt Nunu. The general rejects his request, saying that Jack cannot be both a soldier and her father. Instead, Nunu will be given to a Chinese family living in Los Angeles. Jack reluctantly accepts and bids Nunu a tearful goodbye. Fifty years later, an elderly Jack writes a letter to a grown-up Nunu saying that he was truly in love with her mother and, despite missing her every day, he has come to peace with himself. The address on the envelope in which Jack inserts the letter indicates that Nunu is at a San Diego, California address.

== Cast ==
- Liu Yifei as Ying
- Emile Hirsch as Jack
- Li Fangcong as Nunu
- Yan Yikuan as Kai
- Yu Shaoqun as teacher
- Tsukagoshi Hirotaka as Captain Shimamoto
- Vincent Riotta as Jimmy Doolittle
- Gong Hanlin as Ying's father-in-law
- Jin Zhu as Ying's mother-in-law
- Gallen Lo as Captain Xu
- Gong Tiankuo as Lieutenant Sun
- Shu Yaoxuan as hawker
- Vivian Wu as a middle aged Nunu (the character did not appear in the final cut of the film but was credited with a special acknowledgment).

== Release ==
The film was released in China (10 November 2017), the United States (2 November 2018) and France (14 November 2018). In France, the film was released with an alternative English-language title: The Lost Soldier.

== Awards and nominations ==
- Nominated - Golden Goblet Award for Best Feature Film

== See also ==
- Doolittle Raid
- Pearl Harbor (film)
