= Night Peacock =

- Film poster
- French: Le Paon de Nuit
- Simplified Chinese: 夜孔雀
- Hanyu Pinyin: Yè Kǒng Què
- Directed by: Dai Sijie
- Screenplay by: Dai Sijie; Nadine Perront
- Produced by: Wang Haiyi
- Starring: Liu Yifei; Liu Ye; Yu Shaoqun; Leon Lai
- Cinematography: Saba Mazloum
- Production companies: SMG Pictures; Haixiu Media (Tianjin); Daqing Baihu Entertainment; E Mei Film Group; France WuDiYaNa Production; Haixiu Entertainment (Hongkong)
- Distributed by: SMG Pictures (China); Beijing Lupiaoda Media (China)
- Release date: 20 May 2016 (China)
- Running time: 84 minutes (China); 121 minutes (France)
- Countries: China; France
- Languages: Mandarin; French
- Box office: CN¥26 million

Night Peacock (French: Le Paon de Nuit; Chinese: 夜孔雀) is a 2016 romantic drama film directed by Dai Sijie. The film is a Chinese-French co-production. It stars Liu Yifei, Liu Ye, Yu Shaoqun and Leon Lai. The film was released in mainland China by SMG Pictures and Beijing Lupiaoda Media on 20 May 2016.

== Plot ==
The film is set in Chengdu, China and in France.

== Cast ==
- Liu Yifei
- Liu Ye
- Yu Shaoqun
- Leon Lai

== Production ==
The film was shot in Paris, France, and in Chengdu, China.

== Reception ==
The film has grossed CN¥26 million at the Chinese box office.

=== Critical ===
The film was awarded first prize under the Special Chinese Film category at the 40th Montreal World Film Festival, and Liu was nominated as Best Actress. It also won the Golden Angel Award for Film at the 12th Chinese American Film Festival.
