= The Eleventh Child =

- Film poster
- French: Tang le onzième
- Vietnamese: Nguol thùa
- Directed by: Dai Sijie
- Written by: Dai Sijie; Nadine Perront
- Produced by: Claude Kunetz; Marc Piton; Roger Frappier
- Starring: Akihiro Nishida
- Cinematography: Guy Dufaux
- Edited by: Marie Castro-Vasquez
- Music by: Jean-Marie Sénia
- Production companies: Paris New York Productions; Max Films; La Sept Cinéma
- Distributed by: Rézo Films; France Film
- Release date: September 2, 1998 (MWFF)
- Running time: 91 minutes
- Countries: Canada; France; Vietnam
- Language: Vietnamese

The Eleventh Child (Vietnamese: Nguol thùa) is a 1998 drama film directed by Dai Sijie. A co-production of companies from Vietnam, France and Canada, the film stars Akihiro Nishida as Tang, a Vietnamese man who returns to his hometown upon learning that his brother is ill with leprosy. Community folklore holds when a family from the area gives birth to five sons and five daughters, they will gain the power to kill a large fish in the nearby lake whose flesh can cure the disease; Tang already has five sons and four daughters and his wife is pregnant once more, meaning that he may become the one who can fulfill the community's dreams.

== Critical response ==
Godfrey Cheshire of Variety praised Dai's visual sense and Guy Dufaux's cinematography, but wrote that "the problem, from first till last, is all in the script, which gives no indication that its events connect meaningfully with anything in the real world. There’s no sense that this village and its beliefs reflect any actual culture, nor is there a hint that the tale’s action is meant to symbolize or comment on contemporary reality in Asia. Lacking both a concrete ethnography and imaginative resonance, pic plays out like an opaque and pointless history pageant, expertly choreographed but devoid of passion and purpose."

== Awards ==
Dufaux received a Jutra Award nomination for Best Cinematography at the 2nd Jutra Awards in 2000.
