= The Third Way of Love =

- Theatrical poster
- Traditional Chinese: 第三種愛情
- Simplified Chinese: 第三种爱情
- Hanyu Pinyin: Dì Sān Zhǒng Ài Qíng
- Directed by: John H. Lee (Lee Jae-han)
- Screenplay by: Niu Han
- Starring: Liu Yifei; Song Seung-heon
- Edited by: Gim U-hyeon
- Music by: Seo Jae-hyeok; Jang Ji-weon
- Production company: HS Gala-Pictures (Beijing) (CN)
- Distributed by: HS Entertainment Group (CN)
- Release dates: 25 September 2015 (China); 19 May 2016 (South Korea)
- Running time: 113 minutes
- Country: China
- Language: Mandarin
- Box office: US$11.27 million

The Third Way of Love (Chinese: 第三种爱情) is a 2015 Chinese romance film directed by John H. Lee and starring Liu Yifei and Song Seung-heon. The film was released on 25 September 2015.

== Plot ==
The film follows Lin Qi Zheng (Song Seung-Heon), who is from a rich family, and Zou Yu (Yifei Liu) who is a smart and beautiful lawyer, as they fall in love.

== Cast ==
- Liu Yifei as Zou Yu
- Song Seung-heon as Lin Qizheng
- OD
- Jessie Chiang
- Meng Jia as Zou Yue (Yu's younger sister)
- Jiang Yuchen as Jiang Xinyao
- Zong Xiaoju as Ouyang (department head)
- Qu Gang as Fu
- Liu Jin as the labour contractor
- Pan Yigang as Wang (suicidal worker)
- Xue Yuanyuan (Wang's wife)
- Gao Rui
- Liu Zhiyun
- Zhao Yiming
- Feng Dalu (Lin Qizheng's father)
- Zhang Pingjuan (Lin Qizheng's mother)
