= Ordinary Hero (2022 film) =

- Theatrical release poster
- Chinese: 平凡英雄
- Hanyu Pinyin: Píngfán Yīnxióng
- Directed by: Tony Chan
- Screenplay by: You Xiaoying
- Produced by: Tony Chan
- Starring: Li Bingbing; Feng Shaofeng; Huang Xiaoming
- Cinematography: Edmond Fung
- Edited by: Ron Chan
- Music by: Peter Kam
- Production companies: Bona Pictures Group Co., Ltd.; Tianshan Film Studio; China Southern Airlines Group Co., Ltd.; Alibaba Pictures
- Distributed by: Huaxia Film Distributors; China Film Group Corporation; Bona Film Group
- Release date: 30 September 2022 (China)
- Running time: 97 minutes
- Country: China
- Languages: Mandarin; Uyghur

Ordinary Hero (Chinese: 平凡英雄) is a 2022 Chinese drama film directed and produced by Tony Chan, and starring Li Bingbing and Feng Shaofeng. Based on the true story of the race to save a 7-year-old Uyghur boy from Hotan, Xinjiang, whose arm was severed in a freak accident. The film follows the boy's journey across 1,400 km, as rescue personnel race against time to complete emergency treatment during the critical first eight hours ("the golden hours") in which the limb could be preserved. The film was theatrically released on 30 September 2022, a day before China's National Day.

== Plot ==
At 7:20 PM on April 30th, Xiaomai, who lives in Layika Township, Hotan County, accompanied his mother and brother to a walnut orchard. While his mother and brother were busy with farm work, Xiaomai was playing by the field. While playing, Xiaomai's bamboo dragonfly flew under a running tractor. Trying to retrieve the dragonfly, Xiaomai's right arm became entangled in the running machinery and was severed. Starting at 8:25 PM, Xiaomai's mother and brother drove through the countryside and bazaars to Hotan City, carrying the injured Xiaomai. With the assistance of traffic police and emergency medical personnel, Xiaomai was placed on the operating table at Hotan Regional People's Hospital at 10:00 PM. After bandaging Xiaomai, Dr. Akbar(Aikebai) offered the option of either suturing the wound directly to save his life or traveling to Ürümqi for an arm replacement. Upon hearing this, his mother collapsed in the hospital. Xiaomai's brother, who chose to save his arm, had no choice but to take Xiaomai to the flight to Urumqi.

However, by the time Xiaomai and his brother arrived at the airport by ambulance, the last flight to Ürümqi, CZ6820, was already preparing to take off. With the coordination and assistance of Hotan Airport, China Southern Airlines, Ürümqi Airport, the crew, and passengers on board, the plane returned to the jet bridge and Xiaomai and his brother boarded the flight. At 00:09 on May 1st, Flight CZ6820 took off. To shorten the route of flight and save time, with the assistance of the Civil Aviation Administration of China's Xinjiang Air Traffic Management Bureau and the People's Liberation Army Air Force, the flight flew directly from Hotan through restricted airspace to Ürümqi. On the plane, Xiaomai's wound began to bleed due to pressure changes, and he later developed a pneumothorax caused by the collision with the tractor. With the help of flight attendant Zhou Yan and doctor Liu Rui, Xiaomai overcame the difficulties.

Before arriving in Ürümqi, Ürümqi Airport provided flight CZ6820 with the shortest route. The emergency center activated its emergency plan. At 1:36 a.m., flight CZ6820 landed in Ürümqi. It was already 2:12 a.m. when Xiaomai and his brother arrived at the Affiliated Hospital of Traditional Chinese Medicine of Xinjiang Medical University. The hospital was fully prepared, performing preoperative examinations, cleaning the amputated limb, and drawing blood. Xiaomai's surgery began at 3:09 a.m., and he returned to the ward from the operating room at 7:13 a.m. Xiaomai's mother also arrived in Ürümqi to reunite with Xiaomai and his brother.

== Cast ==
=== Main ===
- Li Bingbing as Zhou Yan, Chief Purser of China Southern flight CZ6820.
- Feng Shaofeng as Lin Li, Orthopedic Surgeon of Urumqi Hospital.
- Parman Parlehati as Mardan aka "Xiao Mai", 7 years old patient.
- Erfan Aziz as Abdul, Mardan's big brother.

=== Supporting ===
- Lin Yongjian as Tian Wei, General Manager of Hotan Airport.
- Huang Xiaoming as Xie Huiyang, Captain of China Southern Airlines flight CZ6820.
- Zhang Yishan as Liu Rui, a doctor on the flight who just resigned from Hotan Hospital.
- Aziguri Rexiti as Mardan's mother
- Gulnazar as Ainur, traffic policewoman on motorbike.
- Ma Tianyu as Song Hui
- Du Chun as Chen Liang
- Huang Yi as Zhang Rongqin, Deputy Head, Hotan Airport Emergency Center.
- Nijat Tursun as Akbar, Director of the Second Department of Orthopedics, Hotan Hospital.
- Zhou Yiran as Yü Li, flight attendant who was frightened.
- Wang Zixuan as Xia Yan, flight attendant.
- Zeng Yue as Zhang Muyun
- Hankiz Omar as dance teacher.
- Gulidiar Anaiti.
- Bai Ke Li as Officer, Traffic Control Center.
- Hu Bingqing
- Na Zhidong as Luo Jian Guo, passenger(father) who sacrificed their seats to Mardan and brother.
- Xi Yuli as Shen Jian, passenger(mother) who sacrificed their seats.
- Sun Xilun as Luo Yi Yao, game-addicted passenger boy(son) who sacrificed their seats.
- Zhu Yin, band leader on flight.
- Wu Hao Chen as Wang Chen Hao, co-pilot.
- Zhang Jing
- Riyat Yusup as Airport Staff, Hotan Airport.
- Akram Askar as Drunkard at Hotan Airport.
- Guo Jinglin
- Barna Parhat, the girl who started singing while Mardan has fallen asleep.
- Shi Haozheng
- Zhang Zixian
- Liu Jun as Ma Zi Jun, Head of Air Traffic Control.
- Wang Ting as Dai Yu, PLAAF Airforce Commander.
- Guo Jiahao
- Jia Qing

== Soundtrack ==
| No. | Title | Lyrics | Music | Singer(s) | Length |
|---|---|---|---|---|---|
| 1. | "Nameless Hero (无名英雄)" (Opening theme) | Wang Zihe | Wang Zihe | Zhou Bichang |
| 2. | "Ordinary Hero (平凡英雄)" (Ending theme) | Gao Jin | Gao Jin | Gao Jin/Tang Jun |

== Production ==
Production started in Urumqi on 16 September 2021 and ended in Qingdao at the end of November.

== Release ==
Ordinary Hero was released on 30 September 2022, in China.

== Reception ==
On September 19, 2022, Ordinary Heroes premiered in Urumqi. The film was released in mainland China on September 30, 2022. A month after its release, the screening time was extended.

Ordinary Heroes grossed RMB 14.65 million on its first day, bringing its cumulative box office to RMB 222 million.
