= Mr. Muo's Travelling Couch =

2003 novel by Dai Sijie

- Author: Dai Sijie
- Original title: Le Complexe de Di
- Translator: Ina Rilke
- Language: French
- Genre: Novel
- Publication date: 2003
- Publication place: France
- English publication date: 2005
- Media type: Print (Hardback & Paperback)

Mr. Muo's Travelling Couch (French: Le Complexe de Di) is a novel by Dai Sijie published in 2003. The French title of the novel is a play on "le complexe d'Oedipe", or "the Oedipus complex". The novel was translated into English in 2005 by Ina Rilke and published as Mr. Muo's Travelling Couch.

== Plot introduction ==
The book follows Muo, a French psychoanalyst, who returns to China to rescue his university sweetheart. She is referred to as "Volcano of the Old Moon" (the characters of her family name represent "old" and "moon," and her given name is composed of the characters for "fire" and "mountain"); while her given name is never revealed, her initials are H.C. Volcano of the Old Moon never makes an appearance in the book, but is thought of often by Muo. (A reviewer noted the similarity to the device of J. D. Salinger in The Catcher in the Rye, where he refers to a Jane Gallagher who never appears.)

The story is not always told chronologically. It sometimes tells where Muo is, then later accounts for how he reached a particular place. The book switches into the point of view of Muo by use of his journal entries or letters, but is otherwise written in the third person.

== Miscellaneous ==
Le Complexe de Di won the Prix Femina in 2003.
