= Symphony of Fate =

2011 Chinese television series

- Genre: Romance; Drama
- Written by: Xu Min
- Directed by: Ke Hanchen
- Starring: Yang Mi; Feng Shaofeng; Guo Zhenni; Chi Shuai
- Country of origin: China
- Original language: Mandarin
- No. of episodes: 30

Production
- Producer: Dong Li
- Running time: 40 minutes
- Production companies: Huace Film & TV

Original release
- Network: Anhui TV; Shenzhen TV
- Release: 3 October – 18 October 2011

Symphony of Fate (Chinese: 命运交响曲) is a 2011 Chinese television series starring Yang Mi and Feng Shaofeng. It is a remake of the South Korean drama Cinderella's Sister (2010). The series was broadcast by AHTV and SHTV from 3 October to 18 October 2011.

== Plot ==
This is the story of two sisters named Anqi (Yang Mi) and Anna (Guo Zhenni). Their dream was to be a famous fashion designer, but fate interred with their lives. They fell in love with the same man- Liu Chenxi (Feng Shaofeng). Anna decided to go to Shanghai to pursue a higher degree. Anqi, who failed the Gaokao exam, met a fashion designer named Zhao Tianyou (Zhang Lunshuo). Three years later, Anna was jealous of Anqi's success in her life. Anna replaced Anqi to become a famous model, and Anqi became a custodian. The kind Anqi never blamed her sister and knew that she needed Anna as a sister. Anqi's designs were approved by Zhao Tianyou and he helped Anqi's self-esteem. Even though Anna kept on hurting Anqi, Anqi forgave her every time and eventually defeated Anna. Anqi helped Anna on her career, and the two sisters found their respective happiness.

== Cast ==
- Yang Mi as Hao Anqi, the protagonist and Anna's sister
- Feng Shaofeng as Liu Chenxi, likes Anqi but died in a car accident
- Guo Zhenni as Hao Anna, Anqi's ambitious sister
- Chi Shuai as Song Chenghao, Anna's ex and Anqi's new boyfriend
- Gao Hao as Yin Haoming, loves Anna
- Zhang Lunshuo as Zhao Tianyou, a famous designer
- Amanda Chou as Liu Yunxi
- Tao Huimin as An Qi's mother
- Chen Weimin as An Qi's father
- Zuo Ling as Liu Jiayu
- Zhu Yushuo as Jian Xiaoai

== Soundtrack ==
No.	Title	Singer	Length
1.	"Symphony of Love (爱的交响)" (Opening theme song)	Golden Zhang
2.	"Palm (手心)" (Ending theme song)	Hung Hsiao-lei
3.	"After the Rain (雨过之后)"	Zhang Tianqi
4.	"Thinking of You"	Golden Zhang

== Reception ==
Symphony of Fate had strong ratings; its first episode ranked first in its time slot in the country. The China Daily said the audience liked its "gripping plot". Hefei Evening News called the series "a stylish urban drama".
