= The Love Winner =

I Love How You Love Me
- Poster
- Traditional Chinese: 喜歡你喜歡我
- Simplified Chinese: 恋爱大赢家
- Directed by: Kevin Chu
- Written by: Chai Hong Bing
- Starring: Jimmy Lin; Liu Yifei; Ambrose Hsu; Kristy Yang
- Cinematography: Tony Cheung
- Edited by: Zeng Jian
- Production company: Yen Ping Films Company
- Release date: 9 October 2004 (Taiwan)
- Running time: 93 minutes
- Country: Taiwan
- Language: Mandarin

The Love Winner (Chinese: 恋爱大赢家; pinyin: Liàn Ài Dà Yíng Jiā), also known as I Love How You Love Me (Chinese: 喜歡你喜歡我; pinyin: Xǐ Huān Nǐ Xǐ Huān Wǒ), is a romantic movie starred by Jimmy Lin (林志颖), Liu Yi Fei (刘亦菲), Xu Shaoyang (许绍洋)，and Yang Gongru (杨恭如). It tells a story that Wang Han Wen (王汉文), who has been studying in a martial arts school, has no intention to take over his father's company and travels to Hong Kong to teach at the Businessmen and Technical College. At that college, he meets a girl named Qian Yue Shan (钱月珊), whose father has been in heavy debt and she must pay him the money back. Wang Han Wen's father knows that Qian Yue Shan (钱月珊) has a close relationship with his son, so he asks her to persuade his son to go back home. He tells her that if she succeeds in getting his son back home, he will help her pay the debt. She has to take this offer seriously after starting it as a joke and conducts a series of love campaigns.

== Cast ==
- Jimmy Lin (林志颖) as Du Heng Feng (杜恒风)
- Liu Yifei (刘亦菲) as Jin Qiao Li (金巧莉)
- Xu Shao Yang (许绍洋) as Wang Han Wen (王汉文)
- Yang Gong Ru (杨恭如) as Qian Yue Shan (钱月珊0
- Dou Zhi Kong (窦智孔) as Li Zhen (李震)
- Wang Dao (王道) as (杜南)

== Synopsis ==
Smuggling businessman Du Nan (杜南) purchases the First College in order to force his son to go to school without dropping out. However, his son Du Heng Feng (杜恒风) has no desire to study and often skips class. He has nothing to do but ask his fellow to drag his son to school and supervise him all day. Meanwhile, the police in Hong Kong sent two undercover officers to get in touch with Du Heng Feng in order to grasp the evidence of his father's crimes. Du Heng Feng falls in love with Jin Qiao Li (金巧莉), a girl who has just lost her boyfriend and has no will to date anyone else. Jin Qiao Li's friend falls in love with her teacher, but the teacher has a crush on Qian Yue Shan (钱月珊). One of the officers helps her make a move on the teacher, but she fails. She falls in love with him in the end. Having gone through such a memorable experience, they become best friends. Eventually, the three pairs of lovers culminate their long friendship.
