= For Love or Money (2014 film) =

- Theatrical poster
- Traditional Chinese: 露水紅顏
- Simplified Chinese: 露水红颜
- Hanyu Pinyin: Lù Shuǐ Hóng Yán
- Directed by: Gao Xixi
- Based on: For Love or Money by Amy Cheung (writer)
- Starring: Rain; Liu Yifei; Wang Xuebing; Joan Chen; Shao Feng
- Release date: 7 November 2014
- Running time: 98 minutes
- Country: China
- Language: Mandarin
- Box office: $9,960,000

For Love or Money (Chinese: 露水红颜) is a Chinese romance film based on Hong Kong novelist Amy Cheung's 2006 novel of the same name. The film was directed by Gao Xixi and starring Liu Yifei and Rain. Originally slated for release on 11 November 2014, the film was moved earlier to 7 November 2014.

== Cast ==
- Rain as Xu Chengxun
- Liu Yifei as Xing Lu
- Wang Xuebing
- Joan Chen as Xu Chengxun's Mother
- Shao Feng
- Tiffany Tang as Ming Zhen
- Andy On as Lian
- Sun Haiying
- Allen Lin
- Dong Yong

== Box office ==
The film had grossed ¥65.38 million at the Chinese box office.
