= Balzac and the Little Chinese Seamstress =

Semi-autobiographical novel by Dai Sijie

- One version of the front cover of the novel
- Author: Dai Sijie
- Original title: Balzac et la petite tailleuse chinoise
- Translator: Ina Rilke
- Genre: Historical, Semi-autobiographical novel
- Publisher: Anchor Books
- Publication date: 2000
- English publication date: 2001
- Media type: Print (Hardback & Paperback)
- Pages: 184
- ISBN: 0-375-41309-X
- OCLC: 46884190
- Dewey Decimal: 843/.92 21
- LC Class: PQ2664.A437 B3513 2001

Balzac and the Little Chinese Seamstress (French: Balzac et la petite tailleuse chinoise) is a semi-autobiographical novella written by Dai Sijie, and published in 2000 in French and in English in 2001. It has been translated into more than 25 languages. A film based on his novel directed by Dai was released in 2002.

== Plot summary ==
The novel, written by Dai Sijie, is about two teenage boys during the Chinese Cultural Revolution, Luo, described as having "a genius for storytelling", and the unnamed narrator, "a fine musician". They are assigned to re-education through labor and are sent to a mountain called "Phoenix of the Sky" near Tibet to work in the coal mines and with the rice crop, because their doctor parents have been declared enemies of the state by the government. The two boys fall in love with the Little Seamstress, the daughter of the local tailor and "the region's reigning beauty". Residents of the small farming village are delighted by the stories the two teenagers retell from classic literature and movies that they have seen. They are even excused from work for a few days to see The Flower Girl at a nearby town and later retell the story to the townspeople, through a process known as "oral cinema".

Luo and the narrator meet Four-Eyes, the son of a poet, who is also being re-educated. Although he is succeeding in re-education, he is also hiding a secret set of foreign novels that are forbidden by Chinese law. The boys convince Four-Eyes to let them borrow the book Ursule Mirouët by Honoré de Balzac. After staying up all night reading the book, Luo gives the book to the narrator and leaves the village in order to tell the story to the Little Seamstress. Luo returns carrying leaves from a tree near where he and the Little Seamstress had sex.

The village headman, who has just had an unsuccessful dental surgery, threatens to arrest Luo and the narrator for harboring forbidden ideas from The Count of Monte Cristo if they don't agree to find a solution to the headman's dental problems. The pair find a solution and turn the drill "slowly... to punish him". Later, the headman allows Luo to go home to look after his sick mother. While Luo is gone, the Little Seamstress finds out that she is pregnant, which she confides to the narrator. However, since the revolutionary society does not permit having children out of wedlock, and she and Luo are too young, the narrator must set up a secret abortion for her. Luo comes back to the village three months after this unexpected event.

The Little Seamstress learns about the outside world by reading the foreign books with Luo's help. She eventually leaves the mountain and everything that she has known without saying goodbye, to start a new life in the city. Luo becomes inebriated and incinerates all of the foreign books "in [a] frenzy", ending the novel.

== Characters ==
- Narrator, Teenage boy named Ma with a talent for the violin.
- Luo, the narrator's best friend, son of two famous dentists and talented in storytelling.
- The Little Seamstress, the daughter of a famous local tailor, is a rare beauty with no formal education who cannot read well, so Luo and the narrator read to her.
- The Village Headman, the leader of the village to which the narrator and Luo are sent for re-education, is a 50-year-old "ex-opium farmer turned Communist cadre." One day, he blackmails Luo to fix his teeth in return for not sending the narrator to jail.
- Four-Eyes, the son of a writer and a poet, must wear thick glasses to compensate for his nearsightedness. He possesses a suitcase full of forbidden "reactionary" Western novels that the Narrator and Luo covet and eventually steal. He is referred to as a character who is accustomed to humiliation. He ends up leaving the mountain when his mother convinces the government to end his re-education early and gets Four-Eyes a job at a newspaper.
- The Miller is an old man who lives alone and is a repository of local folk songs. The Miller narrates one part of the novel and provides songs to the boys, who then relate them to Four-Eyes. He is one of the characters who chooses not to be involved with the revolution.
- The Tailor, the father of the Little Seamstress and the only tailor on the mountain, is a rich and popular man. He is old but energetic and widely travelled. At one point in the story, the narrator recounts The Count of Monte Cristo to him while he spends the night with the narrator and Luo. Through this experience, he gains a slight air of sophistication, and the story begins to influence the clothes that he makes.
- The Gynaecologist, a man around forty, with "grizzled lanky hair [and] sharp features," performs the Little Seamstress's illegal abortion in return for a book by Balzac, but ends up getting two books, Ursule Mirouet and Jean Christophe, due to the main character's generosity.

== Major themes ==
=== Power of education and literature ===
Critics have noted that the novel deals with the strength of education and literature. Jeff Zaleski of Publishers Weekly said that the novel "emphasize[s] the power of literature to free the mind." A book review by Brooke Allen in The New York Times addresses the themes, such as the "potency of imaginative literature and why it is hated and feared by those who wish to control others." This reviewer addresses the evil and ultimate failure of "any system that fears knowledge and education... and closes the mind to moral and intellectual truth" as well.

The narrator mentions that western literature is banned and many forms of books and music have been altered to support Mao, with the novel showing how storytelling and censorship stand in opposition to each other, and how storytelling gives individuals power and knowledge despite censorship.

=== Friendship and lost innocence ===
The major themes of Balzac and the Little Chinese Seamstress include friendship and lost innocence.

=== Cultural superiority ===
Balzac and the Little Chinese Seamstress deals with the theme of cultural superiority and balance between varying cultural influences.

== Style ==
Balzac and the Little Chinese Seamstress is notable for its size. Publishers Weekly stated that Balzac was a "slim first novel", and Brooke Allen at The New York Times Book Review called the narrative "streamlined".

Balzac and the Little Chinese Seamstress is written in a characteristic style. The novel focuses and "accents on a soft center rather than ... hard edges", according to Josh Greenfield of Time Europe. A vast majority of the characters in the narrative have "epithets rather than names", adding to the relaxed writing style of the novel.

== Background ==
=== Cultural Revolution ===
Balzac and the Little Chinese Seamstress is set during the time known as the Cultural Revolution in China. This historical event helped to supply the framework for many of the conflicts faced in the novel. The Revolution of Chairman Mao Zedong "began in 1966 and continued until the dictator's death ten years later". The Cultural Revolution in China was "intended to stamp out the educated class and . . . old ideas, old culture, old customs, and old habits". In order to do this, "hundreds of thousands of Chinese intellectuals [were sent] to peasant villages for re-education", and within the years of "1968-1975, some twelve million youths were 'rusticated'."

=== Dai Sijie's past ===
Dai himself was re-educated, and "spent the years between 1971 and 1974 in the mountains of Sichuan Province". He emigrated to France in 1984.

== Publication history ==
Balzac and the Little Chinese Seamstress has been translated from the original French. The novel was first published in France in the French language" in 2000, and since then, rights of the book have been sold in nineteen countries. The English translation of Balzac and the Little Chinese Seamstress by Ina Rilke was published by the company in 2001 Knopf and has been praised for its clarity." The Chinese version of the novel is available online. In 2001, this novel was also made into the film with Dai as its director. All the dialogue in the film uses the Sichuan dialect.

== Reception ==
The book received reviews related to its "warmth and humor." It has been stated as well that the novel "abound[s] in gentle humor, warm bonhomie and appealing charm" in Time Europe.

The novel has likewise been seen as an emotional tale. Jeff Zaleski has reviewed Balzac as a "moving, [and] often wrenching short novel". Dai Sijie has been praised as a "captivating, amazing, storyteller" whose writing here is "seductive and unaffected". In a San Jose Mercury News article, the novel is described as one that will resonate with the reader.

Topics covered in the book—to do with the Cultural Revolution—have been elaborated on and reviewed. Dai Sijie, as "an entertaining recorder of China's 'ten lost years'," addresses the Cultural Revolution. It is seen by some as "a wonderfully human tale" and relatable. The ending of the novel has received some positive attention. The ending has a "smart surprising bite" says a Library Journal article. In Publishers Weekly, the conclusion is described as "unexpected, droll, and poignant". The story itself is seen as unprecedented, "not another grim ... tale of forced labor." Also popular, it has been described as a "cult novel", and was a bestseller in France in the year 2000. However, there have been negative reviews. Brooke Allen of The New York Times Book Review states that the novel is "worthwhile, but unsatisfactory" and that the epithets for most of the characters "work against the material's power." In addition, the novel has received complaints from Chinese government officials in its portrayal of the Cultural Revolution.

== Awards and nominations ==
The book is the winner of several literary awards. The novel won five French literary prizes and was a best seller in 2000."

== Adaptations ==
Dai Sijie directed and adapted his novel into a film, released in 2003, starring Zhou Xun, Liu Ye and Chen Kun.

In the film adaptation, the narrator's name is Ma Jianling (马剑铃). This is a connection to the original French version of the novel in which the narrator describes drawing three symbols that make up the characters in his name, a horse, a sword, and bell. Luo becomes Luo Ming (罗明), although there is no reference to his full name in the novel. In the Mandarin translation of the novel he is referred to by the narrator as A-Luo (阿罗).

== Interviews and reading guides ==
- Book Drum profile. Summary, glossary, setting and page-by-page illustrated notes in English.
- Interview with Dai Sijie on NPR's All Things Considered. In French with English translation. Originally aired March 17, 2002.
- INA interview with Dai Sijie. Originally aired January 21, 2000.
- Interview with Dai Sijie from bacfilms.com. French.
- http://www.readinggroupguides.com/guides3/balzac_and_the_seamstress1.asp

== Articles and Book Reviews ==
- Allen, Brooke. "A Suitcase Education." New York Times Book Review, 9/16/2001, p 24.
- Bloom, Michelle E. "Contemporary Franco-Chinese Cinema: Translation, Citation and Imitation in Dai Sijie's Balzac and the Little Chinese Seamstress and Tsai Ming-Liang's What Time is it There?" Quarterly Review of Film and Video, 22:311–325, 2005. doi:10.1080/10509200590475797
- Chevaillier, Flore. "Commercialism and Cultural Misreading in Dai Sijie's Balzac et la petite tailleuse chinoise." Forum for Modern Language Studies, 2011 Jan; 47 (1): 60–74. doi:10.1093/fmls/cqq074
- Coltvet, Ben McDonald. Review in Christian Century, 1/2/2002, Vol. 119 Issue 1, p 37. Abstract available at http://www.christiancentury.org/reviews/2011-05/balzac-and-little-chinese-seamstress-dai-sijie
- McCall, Ian. "French Literature And Film In The USSR And Mao's China: Intertexts In Makine's Au Temps Du Fleuve Amour And Dai Sijie's Balzac Et La Petite Tailleuse Chinoise." Romance Studies, Vol. 24 (2), July 2006. doi:10.1179/174581506x120118
- Riding, Alan. "Artistic Odyssey: Film to Fiction to Film." The New York Times, 7/27/2005, p 1.
- Schwartz, Lynne Sharon. "In the Beginning Was the Book." New Leader, Sep/October 2001, Vol. 84 Issue 5, p. 23.
- Silvester, Rosalind. "Genre and Image in Francophone Chinese Works". Contemporary French and Francophone Studies, Vol. 10, No. 4, December 2006, pp. 367–375. doi:10.1080/17409290601040346
- Watts, Andrew. "Mao's China in the Mirror: Reversing the Exotic in Dai Sijie's Balzac et la Petite Tailleuse chinoise." Romance Studies, 2011 Jan; 29 (1): 27–39. doi:10.1179/174581511X12899934053284
- Wiegand, David. "Painful Truths: Revolution-era Fable Explores the Consequences of Knowledge", San Francisco Chronicle, Sunday, October 28, 2001.
