= Disney Voice Actors =

Disney Voice Actors: A Biographical Dictionary
- Author: Thomas S. Hischak
- Language: English
- Genre: Biographical dictionary
- Published: 2011 (McFarland & Company)
- Publication place: United States

Disney Voice Actors: A Biographical Dictionary is a biographical dictionary of voice actors for The Walt Disney Company, written by Thomas S. Hischak. The book was first published in 2011 by McFarland & Company.

== Reception ==
The book has received reviews from publications including Reference Reviews of Emerald Group Publishing and Reference & Research Book News.

Reference Reviews wrote that the book was a "highly useful guide" and "an important reference tool for the study of film animation" containing "hard-to-find information". Reference & Research Book News wrote that "this interesting biographical dictionary explores detailed histories of the lives and work of actors who have provided the voices for important characters throughout history of Disney films and cartoons".

== See also ==
- List of biographical dictionaries
