= Daniel Lee (film director) =

Hong Kong film director and screenwriter

- Born: April 27, 1960 (age 66); China
- Occupations: Film director; screenwriter; assistant director; art director

Daniel Lee Yan-Kong (Chinese: 李仁港; pinyin: Lǐ Réngǎng; Jyutping: lei5 jan4 gong2) (born April 27, 1960) is a Hong Kong filmmaker. He is known for directing action and martial-arts themed films.

Lee directed the 2003 film The Kumite (known as Star Runner internationally), which was nominated for Hong Kong film festival awards and noted for exhibiting American-style filmmaking techniques.

== Filmography ==
Year	Title	Director	Writer	Art Director	Ref.
1987	Princess Fragrance	Assistant			
1988	Starry Is the Night			Yes	
1990	The Revenge of Angel			Yes	
1991	Bury Me High			Yes	
1992	The Prince of Temple Street			Yes	
1993	Lady Supercop			Yes	
1994	What Price Survival	Yes	Yes	Yes	
1996	Black Mask	Yes			
1996	Lover's Tears			Yes	
1998	...Till Death Do Us Part	Yes	Yes		
1999	Moonlight Express	Yes	Yes		
2000	A Fighter's Blues	Yes	Co-writer, story by		
2003	Star Runner	Yes	Co-writer		
2005	Dragon Squad	Yes	Co-writer		
2008	Three Kingdoms: Resurrection of the Dragon	Yes	Co-writer		
2010	14 Blades	Yes			
2011	White Vengeance	Yes			
2015	Dragon Blade	Yes	Yes		
2016	Time Raiders	Yes			
2019	The Climbers	Yes			
