= Dai Sijie =

Chinese–French author and filmmaker

- 戴思杰
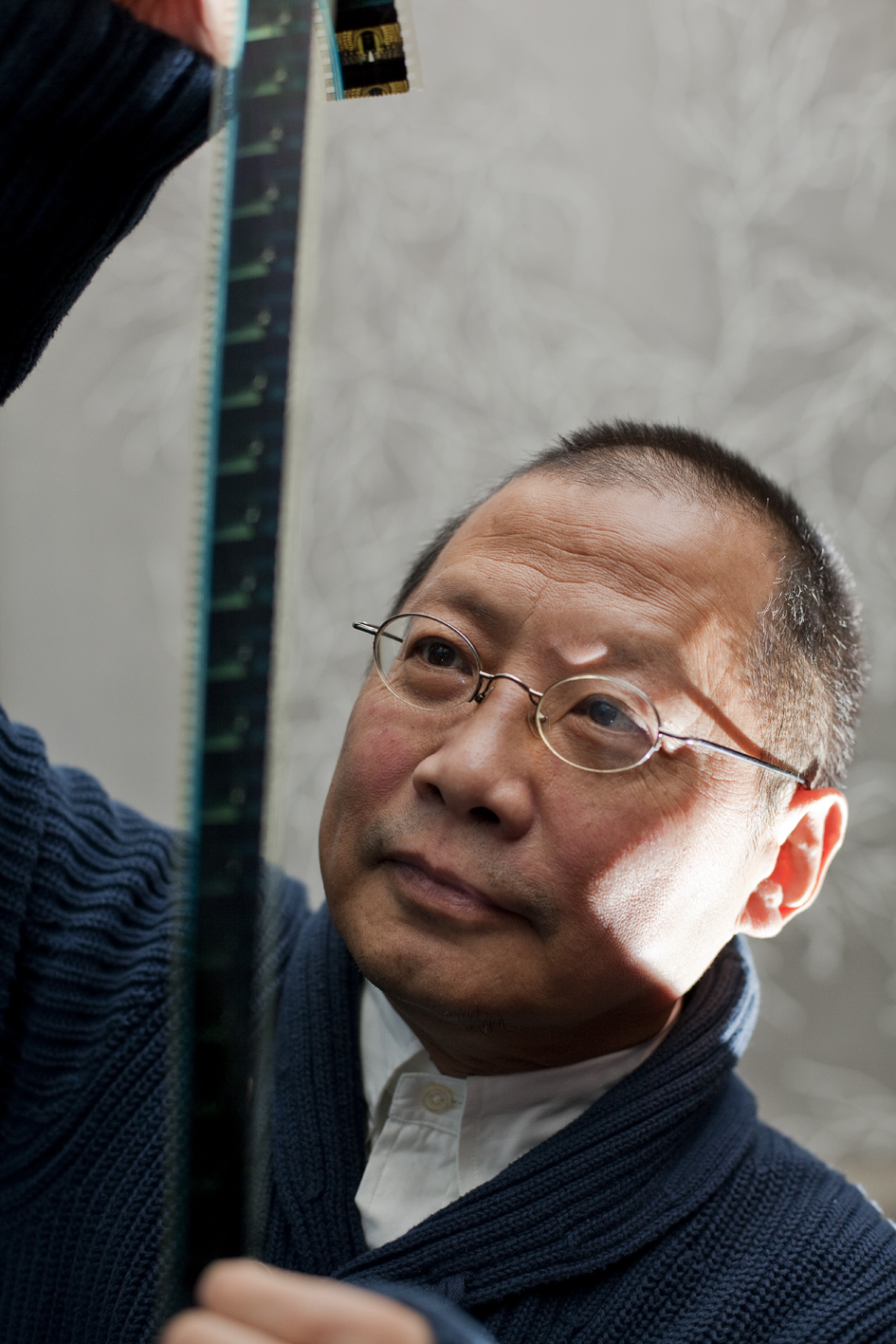
- Dai Sijie in Madrid (2012), by Asís G. Ayerbe
- Born: 2 March 1954 (age 72); Putian, Fujian Province, China
- Occupations: Author, screenwriter, director

Dai Sijie
- Simplified Chinese: 戴思杰
Transcriptions
Standard Mandarin
- Hanyu Pinyin: Dài Sījié
- IPA: [tâɪ sɹ̩́tɕjě]

Dai Sijie (born 2 March 1954) is a Chinese French author and filmmaker living in France since 1984. He writes in French. His first novel, Balzac and the Little Chinese Seamstress, written in French, was a best seller and has been translated into more than 25 languages.

== Early life ==
Dai was born in Putian, Fujian, in 1954. His parents, Professor Dai Baoding and Professor Hu Xiaoyu, were professors of medical sciences at West China University. He grew up reading and thinking extensively. Dai excels at many things, including being a skilled tailor. The Maoist government sent him to a re-education camp in rural Sichuan from 1971 to 1974 during the Cultural Revolution. Though as the only child in the family he would have been excused, he went there with the idea of undergoing the spartan training. Much of this experience was the source of his first book. After his return, he completed his professional certificate as a teacher. He briefly taught in the No. 16 High School of Chengdu upon his enrollment to the Department of History of Sichuan University in February 1978 (so-called 77 grader), where he studied art history.

== Career ==
In 1984, Dai left China for France on a scholarship to study at the Institut des hautes études cinématographiques. There, he acquired a passion for movies and became a director. Before turning to writing, he made three critically acclaimed feature-length films: China, My Sorrow (1989) (original title: Chine, ma douleur), Le mangier de lune (Moon Eater) and Tang, le onzième (The Eleventh Child). He also wrote and directed an adaptation of his novel, Balzac and the Little Chinese Seamstress, released in 2002. He lives in Paris and writes in French.

Dai's novel, Par une nuit où la lune ne s'est pas levée (Once on a Moonless Night), was published in 2007. L'acrobatie aérienne de Confucius (The Aerial Acrobatics of Confucius) was published in 2008.

== Novels ==
Dai's first book, Balzac et la petite tailleuse chinoise (Balzac and the Little Chinese Seamstress) (2000), was made into a movie in 2002, which he himself adapted and directed. It recounts the story of a pair of friends who become good friends with a local seamstress while spending time in a countryside village where they have been sent for "re-education" during the Cultural Revolution (see Down to the Countryside Movement). They steal a suitcase filled with illegal Western classical novels from another man being re-educated and decide to enrich the seamstress's life by exposing her to great literature. These novels also serve to sustain the two companions during this difficult time. The story principally deals with the cultural universality of great literature and its redeeming power. The novel has been translated into twenty-five languages, and finally into his mother tongue after the movie adaptation.

Dai's second book, Le Complexe de Di (The Di Complex) won the Prix Femina in 2003. It recounts the travels of a Chinese man whose philosophy has been influenced by French psychoanalytic thought. The title is a play on "le complexe d'Oedipe", or "the Oedipus complex". The English translation (released in 2005) is titled Mr. Muo's Traveling Couch.

== Works ==
=== Books ===
- Balzac and the Little Chinese Seamstress (Balzac et la petite tailleuse chinoise) – 2000
- Mr. Muo's Travelling Couch (Le Complexe de Di) – 2003 (Prix Femina)
- Once on a Moonless Night (Par une nuit où la lune ne s'est pas levée) – 2007
- The Gospel According to Yong Sheng (L’Évangile selon Yong Sheng) – 2019
- Les Caves du Potala, 2020

=== Filmography as director ===
- China, My Sorrow (Chine, ma douleur) – 1989 (Prix Jean Vigo)
- Moon Eater (Le mangeur de lune) – 1994
- The Eleventh Child (Tang le onzième) – 1998
- Balzac and the Little Chinese Seamstress (Balzac et la petite tailleuse chinoise) – 2002
- The Chinese Botanist's Daughters (Les filles du botaniste) – 2006
- Night Peacock (Le paon de nuit) – 2016
