= Lemuel Davis =

American computer programmer

Lemuel Lanier Davis (born 1953 in Mississippi) is a software engineer and former professor at Palomar College.

== Education ==
Lemuel (Lem) Davis earned his master's degree in electrical engineering (M.S.E.E.) from the University of Illinois at Urbana–Champaign. He earned his bachelor's degree in electrical engineering (B.S.E.E.) from the University of South Alabama.

== Career ==
Davis's career contributions are primarily in the field of computer animation systems. His career highlights include winning an Academy of Motion Picture Arts and Sciences Scientific and Engineering Award in 1991 for his work at Walt Disney Studios with the Computer Animation Production System (CAPS) team. CAPS was a significant advancement in the field of animation, as it was the first digital ink and paint system used in animated feature films. Michael Eisner later wrote, "This new technology, Lem argued, had the potential to revolutionize animated movies, both by creating efficiencies and by giving artists a new range of creative capacities that were the equivalent of moving from writing by hand to using a personal computer." As a lead architect of the CAPS team, Davis worked as a technical director on Disney's first fully computer-animated short film, Oilspot and Lipstick. Davis is credited with the concept of the experimental film, in which two junkyard dogs fall in love and are menaced by a monster made of junk. It debuted at the 1987 SIGGRAPH Conference and was shown again in 1988 at the NCGA Video Showcase. As part of the CAPS team, Davis worked on The Little Mermaid (1989) and The Rescuers Down Under (1990). The CAPS system was in use until 2003.

In 2000, Davis won the Society of Motion Picture and Television Engineers Journal Award along with Arjun Ramamurthy and Franz Herbert for their article, "Achieving Color Match Between Scanner, Monitor, and Film: A Color Management Implementation for Feature Animation."

During Davis's time at Disney, he contributed to the animated films The Black Cauldron (1985) and The Rescuers Down Under (1990) as Digital Production System Developer. At Warner Bros. Studios, Davis contributed to the animated films Balto (1995) as Director of Technology, Quest for Camelot (1998), The Iron Giant (1999) as Technology Supervisor, and Osmosis Jones (2001) as Technology Manager. He later worked for Laika, Inc. as they produced Coraline (2009).

Davis currently lives in San Diego, California. He was an adjunct professor at Palomar College, teaching CSCI 212, an assembly language course.

== CG Production System Development ==
- The Black Cauldron (1985) CGI animator
- Oilspot and Lipstick (1987) original concept/technical director
- The Little Mermaid (1989) CG production system developer
- The Rescuers Down Under (1990) digital production system developer
- Balto (1995) director of technology
- Quest for Camelot (1998) technology team
- The Iron Giant (1999) technology supervisor
- Osmosis Jones (2001) technology manager

== See also ==
- Alias PowerAnimator
- Alias Maya
- Wavefront Technologies
- Softimage 3D
- Pixar RenderMan
- Silicon Graphics
