= OpenPipeline =

openPipeline
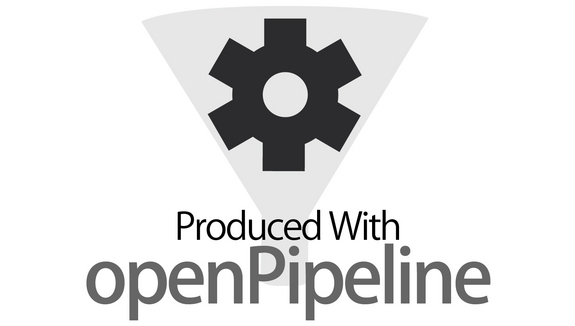

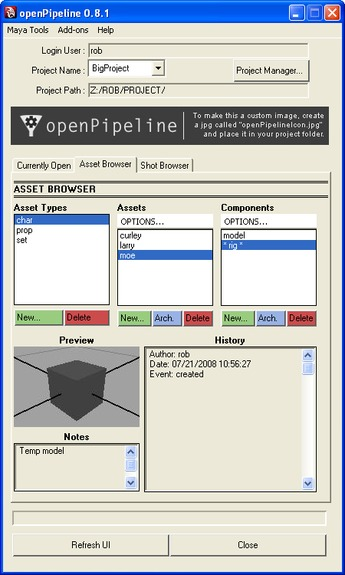
- openPipeline's main interface
- Developer: Pratt Institute Digital Arts Lab
- Release: December 28, 2006; 19 years ago
- Preview release: 0.9.2 / August 5, 2010; 15 years ago
- Written in: MEL
- Platform: Autodesk Maya
- Type: Graphics pipeline
- License: BSD License
- Website: openpipeline.cc

openPipeline is an open-source plug-in for Autodesk Maya that is designed to assist in a Production Pipeline structure and Computer animation.

== Development ==
Created in Maya Embedded Language, openPipeline was initiated at Eyebeam Atelier and further developed at Pratt Institute in the Digital Arts Lab. The initial release date was December 28, 2006.

== Contributors ==
- Rob O'Neill (Creator)
- Paris Mavroidis
- Meng-Han Ho
