= Henry LaBounta =

American-Canadian special and visual effects artist

- Occupations: Special and visual effects artist

Henry LaBounta is an American-Canadian special and visual effects artist. He was nominated for an Academy Award in the category Best Visual Effects for the film Twister.

At the 50th British Academy Film Awards, he won a BAFTA Award for Best Special Visual Effects. His win was shared with Stefen Fangmeier, John Frazier and Habib Zargarpour.

== Selected filmography ==
- Twister (1996)
