= Oilspot and Lipstick =

- Directed by: Michael Cedeno
- Story by: Michael Cedeno, Bruce Morris, Gary Trousdale
- Produced by: Dave Inglish
- Edited by: Bob Lambert (video editor), David F. Wolf (film editor)
- Music by: Jay Ferguson
- Animation by: Ruben A. Aquino, Michael Cedeno, Brian Clift, Anthony de Rosa, Jim Houston, Tina Price, and M.J. Turner
- Layouts by: Fred Cline
- Backgrounds by: Brian Sebern
- Production company: Walt Disney Feature Animation
- Release date: June 28, 1987
- Running time: 3 minutes
- Country: United States
- Language: English

Oilspot and Lipstick is an animated short film from Walt Disney Feature Animation directed by Michael Cedeno. The short was released on June 28, 1987.

== Synopsis ==
An old, broken-down car sits on a mountain. Out of the trunk of this car comes a robot dog with glasses whose body was made, among other things, of cubes. The dog wakes up his partner, another robot dog, who has a high-heeled shoe and a pair of scissors for a head. After touching a mountain of rubbish, a giant robot wakes up, chases the dogs and grabs the female dog with one hand to eat her. The robot dog throws his spanner at the giant robot's head. The wrench causes the robot to fall to the ground. Thus, the female robot falls into the suitcase of the car.

== Credits ==
=== Staff ===
- Director: Michael Cedeno
- Producer: Dave Inglish
- Creative consultant: Burny Mattinson
- Story development: Michael Cedeno, Bruce Morris, Gary Trousdale
- Original concept: Lemuel Davis
- Music: Jay Ferguson
- Animators: Ruben A. Aquino, Michael Cedeno, Brian Clift, Anthony de Rosa, Jim Houston, Tina Price, M.J. Turner
- Drawing effects animators: Barry Cook
- Additional animation: Jim Houston
- Layout artist: Fred Cline
- Background artist: Brian Sebern
- Video editing: Bob Lambert, David Jones
- Film editing: David F. Wolf
- Production manager: M.J. Turner
- Technical directors:
  - Production/Animation: Tad Gielow
  - Compositing/Effects: Lemuel Davis, David B. Coons, Jim Houston
- CG systems management: Tad Gielow, Mark Kimball, M.J. Turner, Vahe Sarkissian
- Wavefront consultant: John Grower
- Computer production hardware: Edge Computer Corporation
- Computer production hardware/software for animation tests: Pixar, Inc.
- Computer production software: Wavefront Technologies

== Premiere of the film ==
The short film was premiered at the SIGGRAPH conference, held in Anaheim, California, but was never released in cinemas.
