= Bill Kovacs =

American computer graphics technologist (1949–2006)

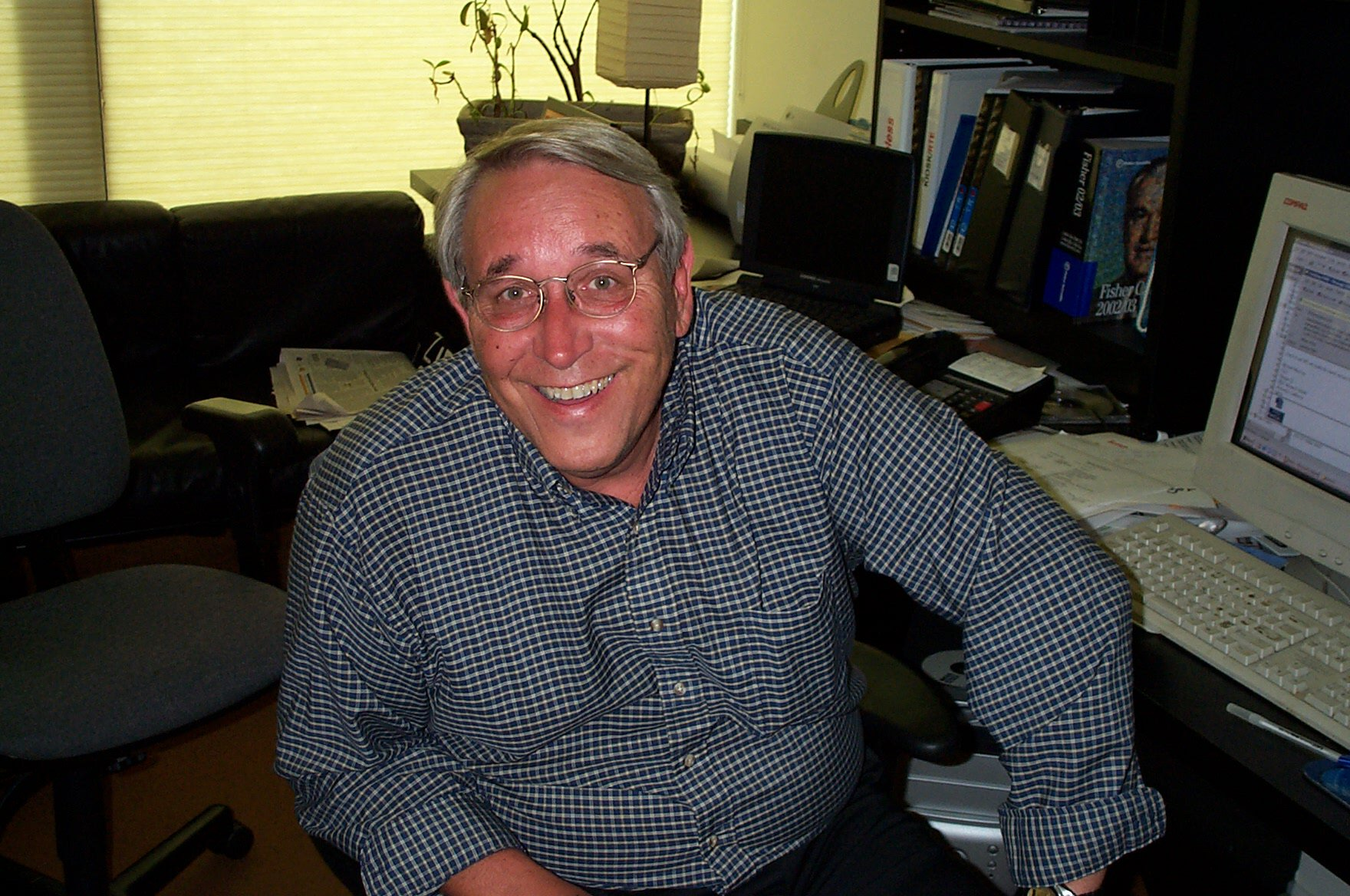
Bill Kovacs at Rezn8 in 2002

Bill Kovacs (October 25, 1949 – May 30, 2006) was a pioneer of computer animation technology. In 1997, he shared the Academy of Motion Picture Arts and Sciences's Scientific and Engineering Academy Award for Digital Imaging.

== Early life ==
Bill Kovacs was born on October 25, 1949. He graduated with a bachelor of architecture from Carnegie Mellon University in 1971. He later graduated from Yale University with a masters of environmental design in 1972.

== Career ==
Kovacs worked as an associate at the architectural firm Skidmore, Owings and Merrill. There he worked on the firm's computer-aided design system. He then worked at the computer animation company Robert Abel and Associates as a vice president of research and development from 1978 to 1984. At Abel, Kovacs (along with Roy Hall and others) developed the company's animation software. Kovacs used this software, with others in the film Tron.

In the early 1980s, Kovacs co-founded Wavefront Technologies. He was chief technology officer of Wavefront from 1984 to 1994 and lead the development of products, including The Advanced Visualizer. The company was later sold to SGI for US$138,000,000. Along with Richard Childers and Chris Baker, he was a key organizer of the Infinite Illusions at the Smithsonian Institution exhibit in 1991. Following retirement from Wavefront, Kovacs co-founded Instant Effects, worked as a consultant to Electronic Arts and RezN8, serving as RezN8's CTO from 2000 until his death.

Kovacs was a lecturer at Expressions New Media and San Francisco's Academy of Art College. He also served on the presidential advisory board at the Academy of Art College. He was a visiting artist for technology at Loyola Marymount University. In 2005, he was a member of the adjunct faculty in the Department of Animation at Woodbury University, developed and taught The Future of Media: The Evolution of Digital Technology. From 2004 until his death, he served as a special advisor to Heather Kurze, the dean of the School of Architecture and Design at Woodbury University. Beginning in 2005, Kovacs advised Dori Littell-Herrick, the new chair of the Department of Animation at Woodbury on the role of technology in the growing department, both in facilities and in curriculum. Together with other faculty, he participated in creating interdisciplinary classes involving architecture and animation students, including "Urban Environments in Maya". Kovacs also assisted Littell-Herrick to broaden the pool of adjunct faculty for the department.

== Personal life ==
Kovacs's domestic partner was Kathy Salyer. Following a stroke, Kovacs died on May 30, 2006, aged 56, at his home in Camarillo, California.

== Awards ==
In 1997, Kovacs shared the Academy of Motion Picture Arts and Sciences's Scientific and Engineering Academy Award for Digital Imaging with Roy Hall for their roles in developing Wavefront's Advanced Visualizer computer graphics system. In 1980, he received two Clio Awards for his work on animated TV commercials.
