= Dynamation (software) =

3D visual effects software

Wavefront Technologies' Dynamation
- Developer: Wavefront
- Release: 1992; 34 years ago
- Operating system: Silicon Graphics, IRIX, Windows
- Type: 3D computer graphics
- License: Proprietary

Dynamation was a 3D computer graphics particle generator program sold by Wavefront to run on SGI's IRIX operating system as part of The Advanced Visualizer. The core software was originally developed by Jim Hourihan while at Santa Barbara Studios, a visual effects company owned by effects pioneer John Grower. The software was licensed to Wavefront Technologies in 1992, and passed through to the merged company Alias/Wavefront. It was introduced as a product at SIGGRAPH in 1993. In 1996, Jim Hourihan received a Scientific and Engineering Award for the primary design and development of Dynamation.

Dynamation could create behavioral particle systems that responded to gravity, air resistance, and other real world physics. It gave users an interactive environment to create and modify dynamic events such as water, clouds, rain, fire and dust. The interactive aspect of this software was revolutionary at the time. Users were able to change parameters and the particle system updated in real time.

The software was used to create visual effects in movies such as Twister, Last Action Hero, Balto, Crimson Tide, Heaven's Prisoners, Michael, Moses, Anaconda, Godzilla, Stuart Little, and Starship Troopers. It was also utilized in the opening credits of Star Trek: Voyager to create an intricate interaction of the starship traveling through cosmic dust.

Dynamation's interactive particle engine has been integrated into the 3D computer graphics package Alias Maya and is no longer sold as a separate product.
