= Wavefront Technologies =

American computer graphics company

- Formerly: Wavefront Technologies, Inc.
- Industry: Software
- Founded: 1984; 42 years ago in Santa Barbara, California
- Founders: Bill Kovacs
- Defunct: February 7, 1995; 31 years ago
- Fate: Acquired by Silicon Graphics to form Alias/Wavefront
- Headquarters: Palo Alto
- Website: www.wavefront.com

Wavefront Technologies was a computer graphics company that developed and sold animation software used in Hollywood motion pictures and other industries. It was founded in 1984, in Santa Barbara, California, by Bill Kovacs, Larry Barels and Mark Sylvester. They started the company to produce computer graphics for movies and television commercials, and to market their own software, as there were no off-the-shelf computer animation tools available at the time. On February 7, 1995, Wavefront Technologies was acquired by Silicon Graphics, and merged with Alias Research to form Alias|Wavefront.

== Products ==
Wavefront developed their first product, Preview, during the first year of business. The company's production department helped tune the software by using it on commercial projects, creating opening graphics for television programs. One of the first customers to purchase Preview was Universal Studios, for the television program Knight Rider. Further early customers included NBC, Electronic Arts, and NASA.

Some of Wavefront's early animation software was created by Bill Kovacs, Jim Keating, and John Grower, after they left Robert Abel and Associates. Roy A. Hall, and others after him, developed the company's flagship product, the Wavefront Advanced Visualizer.

In 1988, Wavefront released the Personal Visualizer, a desktop workstation interface to their high-end rendering software. As with Wavefront's other software, it was developed for Silicon Graphics computers, but it was later ported to Sun, IBM, Hewlett-Packard, Tektronix, DEC and Sony systems. Wavefront purchased Silicon Graphics first production workstation after their offer to buy the prototype they were given a demo of was knocked back.

In 1989, the company released the Data Visualizer, an early commercial tool for scientific visualization.

In 1991, Wavefront introduced Composer, an image manipulation product. Composer became a standard for 2D and 3D compositing and special effects for feature films and, later, television.

In 1992, Wavefront released two new animation tools that worked with The Advanced Visualizer. Kinemation was a character animation system that used inverse kinematics for natural motion. Dynamation was a tool for interactively creating and modifying particle systems for realistic, natural motion. Dream Quest Images used Dynamation and Composer to create over 90 visual effects sequences for the film Crimson Tide. This technology is still being used in the Alias Maya product today.

In 1994, the same year that rival Alias made a deal with Nintendo, Wavefront partnered with Atari to develop the GameWare game development software. GameWare was the exclusive graphics and animation development system for the Atari Jaguar. Electronic Arts' Richard Taylor, said that Wavefront's software was "so beautifully designed that even a non-technical person could learn it. Wavefront was a major reason that CG took a leap forward."

Wavefront software was used in numerous major films, including Luxo Jr., The Great Mouse Detective, Oilspot and Lipstick, Akira, Technological Threat, All Dogs Go to Heaven, Rock-a-Doodle, Off His Rockers, Outbreak, Aladdin, True Lies and Stargate.

== Acquisitions and mergers ==
Wavefront was involved in several mergers of major computer graphics software companies through the 1980s and 1990s. In 1988, Wavefront acquired Abel Image Research, a division of Robert Abel and Associates, where founder Bill Kovacs had previously worked. The acquisition was partially financed by the Belgian government, following Wavefront's establishment of an office in Ghent in association with Barco Graphics of Kortrijk. Acquiring Abel Image Research increased Wavefront's presence in Japan. The Japanese conglomerate CSK became a part owner of Wavefront Japan in 1990, helping to expand the company further in Asia.

Wavefront acquired rival computer graphics company Thomson Digital Images of France in 1993. TDI's software Explore featured innovations in NURBS modeling and interactive rendering. The company also had extensive distribution channels in Europe and Asia.

On February 7, 1995, Silicon Graphics announced that it would purchase Wavefront Technologies and Alias Research, in a deal totaling approximately $500 million. SGI merged the two companies to create Alias, with the goal of creating more advanced digital tools by combining the companies' strengths and reducing duplication. At the time of the merger, Wavefront had a market value of $119 million, and 1994 revenues of $28 million.

What partially motivated this merger was Microsoft's purchase of Alias and Wavefront's competitor Softimage. SGI saw Microsoft's entrance into the market as a threat and merged Alias and Wavefront to compete with Microsoft. Alias is now owned by Autodesk, as is Softimage as of October 2008.

== Academy Awards ==
In 1997, whilst working at Wavefront, Jim Hourihan received an Academy Award for Technical Achievement for the creation of Dynamation. Bill Kovacs and Roy Hall received a Scientific and Engineering Academy Award in 1998 for their work on the Advanced Visualizer.

On March 1, 2003, Alias|Wavefront was awarded an Academy Award for scientific and technical achievement for their Alias Maya software, which had been created from a combination of the earlier software of Wavefront, Alias, and TDI.
