= David Coons =

Computer graphics and scanning professional

David B. Coons
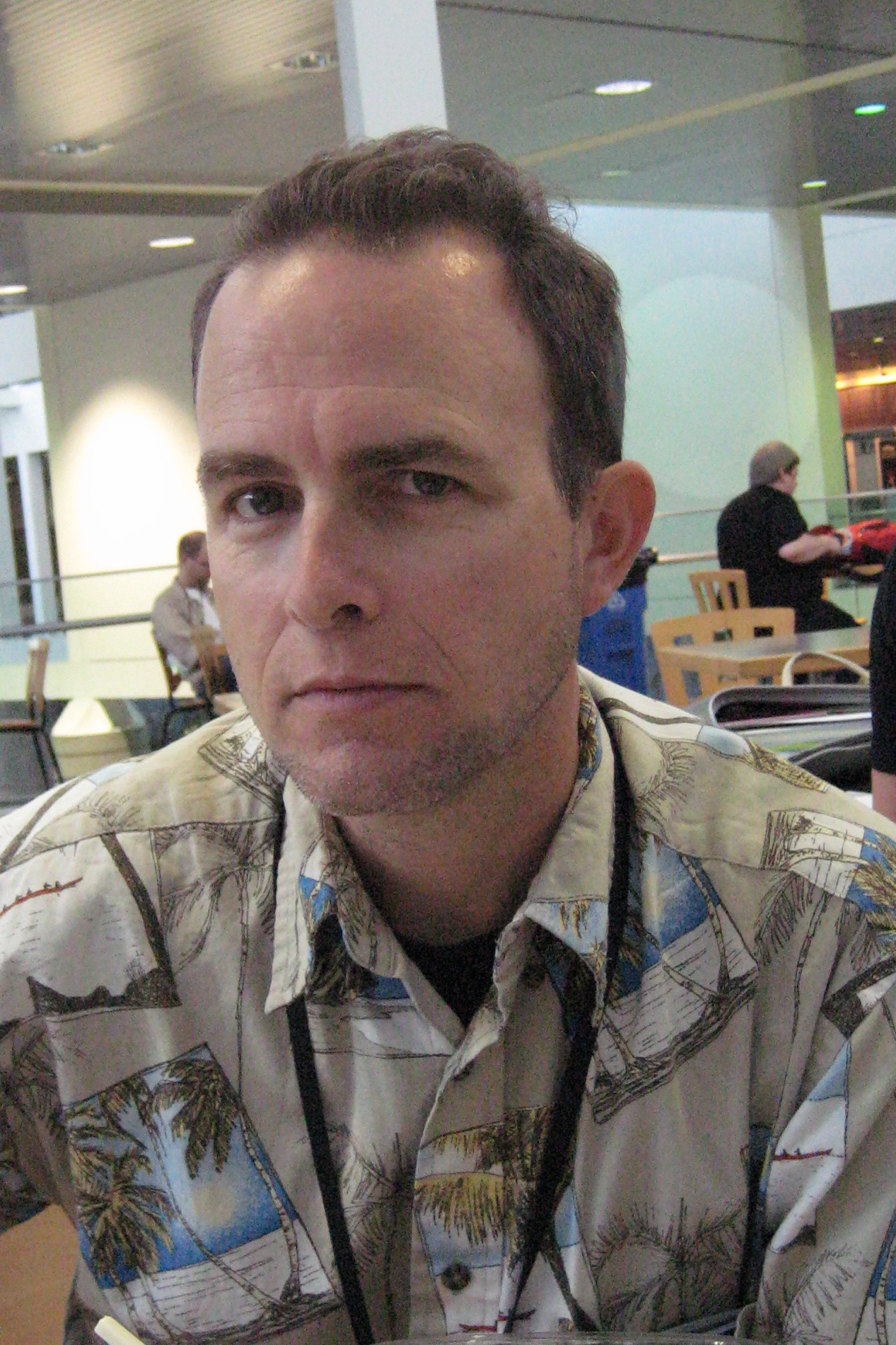
- Born: May 16, 1960 (age 66); Pomona, California
- Occupations: Fine-arts scanner; Computer-graphics guru; Filmmaker
- Website: http://www.artscans.com/

David B. Coons is an American computer graphics professional and CGI pioneer.

== Scanning and computer graphics ==
Active in the Academy of Motion Picture Arts and Sciences, Coons works behind the scenes in the film and computer graphics industries. He is also the president and owner of ArtScans Studio in Culver City, California, where he uses a scanner of his own invention to serve a clientele of celebrity artists and fine artists.

According to the ArtScans website: "ArtScans has been doing accurate colour capture for reproduction since 1992. We own and operate a large (44" x 50") flatbed scanner that is the only one of its kind in the world. Both the scanner and its software were designed by us."

Keith Goldfarb, co-founder of Rhythm and Hues Studios, a computer-graphics studio that works on major motion pictures—Night at the Museum 2: Battle of the Smithsonian and The Chronicles of Riddick (2004)— as well as high-end commercials, has called him "the most knowledgeable person about scanning on this planet."

=== Digital printing ===
David Coons was also a pioneer in the art of digital printing reproduction of scanned and computer generated artwork, specifically adapting the large format IRIS printer, a machine designed to work solely with proprietary prepress computer systems, to this task.

In the late 1980s Coons developed software to use an IRIS 3024 at The Walt Disney Company to print images from Disney's new Computer Animation Production System. He also wrote software to print works created on desktop computers such as Sally Larsen's 1989 Transformer series and a 1990 photography exhibition for Graham Nash of Crosby, Stills, and Nash. The work he did for Nash had to do with re-creating images for prints and negatives had been lost by scanning the remaining contact prints at high resolution, and printing them in extremely large format.

Coons went on to become a business partner with Nash, helping found the Manhattan Beach, California, company Nash Editions, a fine art digital reproduction company based on a $126,000 IRIS printer Nash had purchased. There Coons worked on the many technical problems with scanning and adapting the IRIS printer to fine art printing, including modifying the machines to take heavy paper stock and dealing with the poor fade resistant (fugitive) nature of the inks. These fine art digital prints came to be known by the name "giclée".

In the mid-1990s, Coons shifted his focus exclusively to scanning, while Nash Editions continued to specialize in fine art printing. The two companies maintain a close relationship and often refer clients to each other.

== Film production ==
Coons's Academy Award is for design and development of the Computer Animation Production System production system for film animation; as a technical Oscar, it is shared with the rest of the team that worked on CAPS. This award served to get him into the Academy, where he is regarded as a deeply involved and committed member.

Coons has been involved with motion-picture technology since he was in junior high school, where he was one of the "Audio-Visual Team" that handled the equipment for educational films and shows. Coons has made a number of "amateur" films, in addition to several student-style efforts. He was also the cameraman, cinematographer, craft services and technical consultant on John P. McCann's The Glendale Ogre.

He is widely regarded as a "connector" in the sense Canadian author Malcolm Gladwell wrote about in The Tipping Point, though some see him as a Gladwellian "maven". He has also been identified as the title character (a nudist programmer on the late shift who got in trouble with the security guards) in Po Bronson's non-fiction book on Silicon Valley workers called The Nudist on the Late Shift.

== CG Production System Development ==
- Oilspot and Lipstick (1987) technical director
- The Rescuers Down Under (1990) digital production system developer
- Beauty and the Beast (1991) engineering developer
- Aladdin (1992) engineering development
- Trail Mix-Up (1993) engineer
- Hocus Pocus (1993) engineer
- The Lion King (1994) technology development and support
- Pocahontas (1995) additional technology staff
- The Hunchback of Notre Dame (1996) technology production supporter
