= Habib Zargarpour =

Film art director

- Born: 9 March 1964 (age 62); Tehran, Iran
- Education: University of British Columbia; ArtCenter College of Design
- Occupations: VFX supervisor virtual production supervisor Art director Creative director
- Years active: 1990–present
- Website: habibzargarpour.net

Habib Zargarpour (born 9 March 1964) is an American visual effects supervisor, virtual production supervisor, art director and creative director.

Zargarpour worked on the films Twister (1996) and The Perfect Storm (2000), for which he was nominated for two Academy Awards and won two BAFTA Awards.

== Biography ==
Habib Zargarpour has had almost three decades of experience in visual effect for film. He had worked as a graphic artist and fine arts illustrator since 1981, and began his career in visual effects for film in 1990 when he spent a few years working on digital effects for IMAX films in Los Angeles. He graduated with distinction in Industrial Design from the Art Center College of Design in Pasadena in 1992 and discovered his passion for design in film.

He spent 9 years at Industrial Light & Magic (ILM) where he first joined the team of The Mask in 1993 as a Technical Director. Subsequent projects included the development of such effects as the particle tornadoes in Twister, the digital oceans and stormy seas in The Perfect Storm, Spawn’s cape, and the pod race simulations and crashes in Star Wars: Episode I – The Phantom Menace.

While at ILM, he was nominated for two Academy Awards in Visual Effects for Twister and The Perfect Storm and garnered two British Academy Awards for those films working with visual effects supervisor Stefen Fangmeier. He worked as a Digital Effects Supervisor with John Knoll on the pod race sequences in Star Wars: Episode I – The Phantom Menace and on two Star Trek films: Star Trek Generations and Star Trek: First Contact, working on the never before seen space anomalies and the Phoenix rocket launch sequence. Other creative projects at ILM included all digital underwater shots of Matt Damon in The Bourne Identity, and the alien creatures in Signs.

Zargarpour continues to value the CG industry as the perfect mix of technical and artistic realms. Since 2003, Habib has worked as a Senior Art Director at Electronic Arts on driving and racing titles. His projects included Need for Speed: Underground and James Bond 007: Everything or Nothing. In 2006, he received a VES (Visual Effects Society) Award for his work as Art Director on Need for Speed: Most Wanted.

As of May 2010, Zargarpour was a creative director of Microsoft Game Studios until 2016. He was the consulting Art Director for the Xbox One Launch title Ryse: Son of Rome collaborating with the Crytek team in Frankfurt. In 2014 he became Director of Visuals for Microsoft Studios Global Publishing.

In 2017 he was a Consulting Visual Effects Supervisor on the film Blade Runner 2049 (2017) working with Visual Effects Supervisor John Nelson. In 2023 he was the Visual Effects Supervisor on the Marvel film Ant-Man and the Wasp: Quantumania (2023) for BASE-FX working with the team on several key visual effects scenes.

Zargarpour is an active member of Academy of Motion Picture Arts and Sciences (AMPAS) and British Academy of Film and Television Arts (BAFTA), and a founding member of the Visual Effects Society (VES).

== Filmography ==
- Ant-Man and the Wasp: Quantumania (2023)
- The Adam Project (2022)
- Greyhound (2019)
- Blade Runner 2049 (2017)
- The Jungle Book (2016)
- Silver Cord (2009)
- Signs (2002)
- The Bourne Identity (2002)
- Aizea: City of the Wind (2001)
- The Perfect Storm (2000)
- Star Wars: Episode I – The Phantom Menace (1999)
- Snake Eyes (1998)
- Spawn (1997)
- Star Trek: First Contact (1996)
- Twister (1996)
- Jumanji (1995)
- Star Trek Generations (1994)
- The Mask (1994)
- Adventures in Dinosaur City (1992)

== Art direction ==
- ReCore – Senior Art Director, Microsoft Studios (2016)
- Sunset Overdrive – Senior Art Director, Microsoft Studios (2014)
- Ryse: Son of Rome – Senior Art Director (2013)
- Need for Speed: Shift – Consulting Art Director (2009)
- Need for Speed: Nitro – Consulting Art Director (2009)
- Unannounced EA Spielberg Project LMNO – Senior Art Director (2006-2008)
- Need for Speed: Most Wanted – Senior Art Director (2005)
- James Bond 007: Everything or Nothing – Senior Art Director (driving missions) (2003)
- Need for Speed Underground – Senior Art Director (2003)
