= Twister (1996 film) =

American film by Jan de Bont

- Theatrical release poster
- Directed by: Jan de Bont
- Written by: Michael Crichton; Anne-Marie Martin
- Produced by: Ian Bryce; Michael Crichton; Kathleen Kennedy
- Starring: Helen Hunt; Bill Paxton; Jami Gertz; Cary Elwes
- Cinematography: Jack N. Green
- Edited by: Michael Kahn
- Music by: Mark Mancina
- Production companies: Warner Bros. Pictures; Universal Pictures; Amblin Entertainment
- Distributed by: Warner Bros. Pictures (United States and Canada); Universal Pictures (through United International Pictures; International)
- Release dates: May 8, 1996 (Westwood); May 10, 1996 (United States)
- Running time: 113 minutes
- Country: United States
- Language: English
- Budget: $88–92 million
- Box office: $499 million

Twister is a 1996 American disaster film directed by Jan de Bont and written by Michael Crichton and Anne-Marie Martin. The film stars an ensemble cast that includes Helen Hunt, Bill Paxton, Jami Gertz, and Cary Elwes. Lois Smith, Alan Ruck, Philip Seymour Hoffman, Jeremy Davies, Todd Field, Zach Grenier, Nicholas Sadler, Abraham Benrubi, Jake Busey, and Scott Thomson also star in supporting roles. Its plot follows a group of storm chasers trying to deploy a tornado research device during a severe outbreak in Oklahoma.

Amblin Entertainment co-founder Steven Spielberg was initially attached to direct, and several directors were in talks to direct before De Bont signed on after leaving Godzilla; Spielberg would executive-produce the film with Walter F. Parkes, Laurie MacDonald, and Gerald R. Molen. Filming was done across Oklahoma, with several key sequences filmed in Fairfax, Ralston, Maysville, Guthrie, and Stillwater. Industrial Light & Magic (ILM) handled the visual effects and animation of the tornadoes, with the Dynamotion software being used to develop the basis of the digital tornadoes.

Twister premiered in Westwood, Los Angeles, on May 8, 1996, and was theatrically released on May 10, 1996, in the United States and Canada by Warner Bros. Pictures, and internationally by Universal Pictures through United International Pictures. The film grossed over $499 million worldwide, becoming the second-highest-grossing film of 1996, and selling an estimated 54.7 million tickets in the United States. It received generally positive reviews from critics and Academy Award nominations for Best Visual Effects and Best Sound. It is also notable for being among the first films to be released on DVD in the United States. A standalone sequel, Twisters, was released in 2024.

== Plot ==
On an Oklahoma farm in 1969, young Jo Thornton and her parents take shelter from an F5 tornado (Note: Although the tornado in the opening scene is identified as being of F5 intensity, the scene takes place two years before the Fujita scale was developed by Ted Fujita, in collaboration with Allen Pearson, to rate tornado intensity. Damage ratings were applied retroactively for tornadoes that occurred before the scale was formally implemented in 1972.) that destroys their farm and kills Jo's father. Twenty-seven years later, Jo is a tornado-obsessed meteorologist leading a storm chaser team. Her estranged husband, Bill Harding, an ex-storm chaser turned TV weatherman, travels to Oklahoma with his fiancée Melissa to obtain Jo's signature on their divorce papers.

Jo shows Bill the realized "Dorothy", a device containing hundreds of small weather sensors that Bill conceptualized. Dorothy could revolutionize tornado research and potentially provide an earlier storm-warning system, but the device must be deployed dangerously close to a tornado to work. Jo's team rushes off to chase a developing storm, forcing Bill and Melissa to follow.

Jonas Miller, a rival storm chaser with corporate funding, stole Bill's idea for his own Dorothy-like device, Dot3. Bill agrees to accompany Jo and the team for one day to launch Dorothy. As the team pursues a rope tornado, Jo's truck runs into a ditch attempting to intercept it. Jo and Bill take shelter under a bridge, but the truck and one of the four Dorothy prototypes are destroyed. Bill leads the team in his own truck, chasing another tornado. They chase the tornado, now a waterspout, onto Kaw Lake that is accompanied by another with multiple vortices. The waterspout thrashes the truck around, leaving them unharmed, but Melissa is traumatized.

The team visits Jo's Aunt Meg in nearby Wakita for rest and food. The team then scrambles to chase a developing twister. Jo and Bill intercept a tornado with unpredictable movements. It knocks over power lines that crush Dorothy II. With the truck damaged, Bill forces them to retreat. Jo rants about her father's death. Bill admits his feelings for Jo, unaware that Melissa is overhearing them through the CB radio.

The team overnights in Fairview and Jo signs the divorce papers. A nocturnal tornado forces the team and others into a garage pit for protection. The tornado destroys the garage, two team vehicles, and injures several people before proceeding toward Wakita. Before the team rushes there, Melissa ends her and Bill's engagement, and encourages him to reunite with Jo.

The tornado leaves Wakita in ruins and flattens Aunt Meg's house. The team rescues Aunt Meg, who only has minor injuries. The National Severe Storms Laboratory forecasts that a potentially record-breaking tornado will form the next day. Inspired by Aunt Meg's wind-vane sculptures, Bill and Jo add aluminum "wings" to the last two Dorothy prototype sensors, making them more aerodynamic.

True to the forecast, a mile-wide F5 tornado forms the next day. Bill and Jo attempt to place Dorothy III in its path; however, the device is knocked over and destroyed by an airborne tree. Meanwhile, Jonas attempts to deploy Dot3, ignoring Bill and Jo's warnings that the tornado is changing direction and headed straight at him, as well as that Dot3's packaging is too light and needs to be anchored down. The tornado sweeps Jonas's truck away, killing him and his driver, as well as destroying Dot3. With the last remaining Dorothy, Bill and Jo drive directly at the tornado, then jump out, sacrificing the truck to launch the probes. Dorothy IV's probes provide immediate scientific data, but without their truck, Jo and Bill have to run as the tornado shifts toward them. Inside a nearby farm pumphouse, they strap themselves to deep pipes. As the building rips away, the F5's core passes over them and they are inverted in the vortex. After the tornado dissipates, the team celebrates their success while Jo and Bill reconcile.

== Cast ==
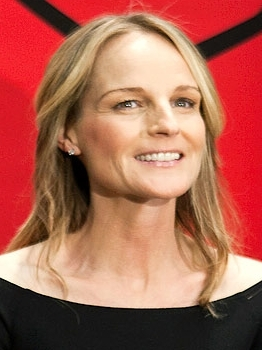
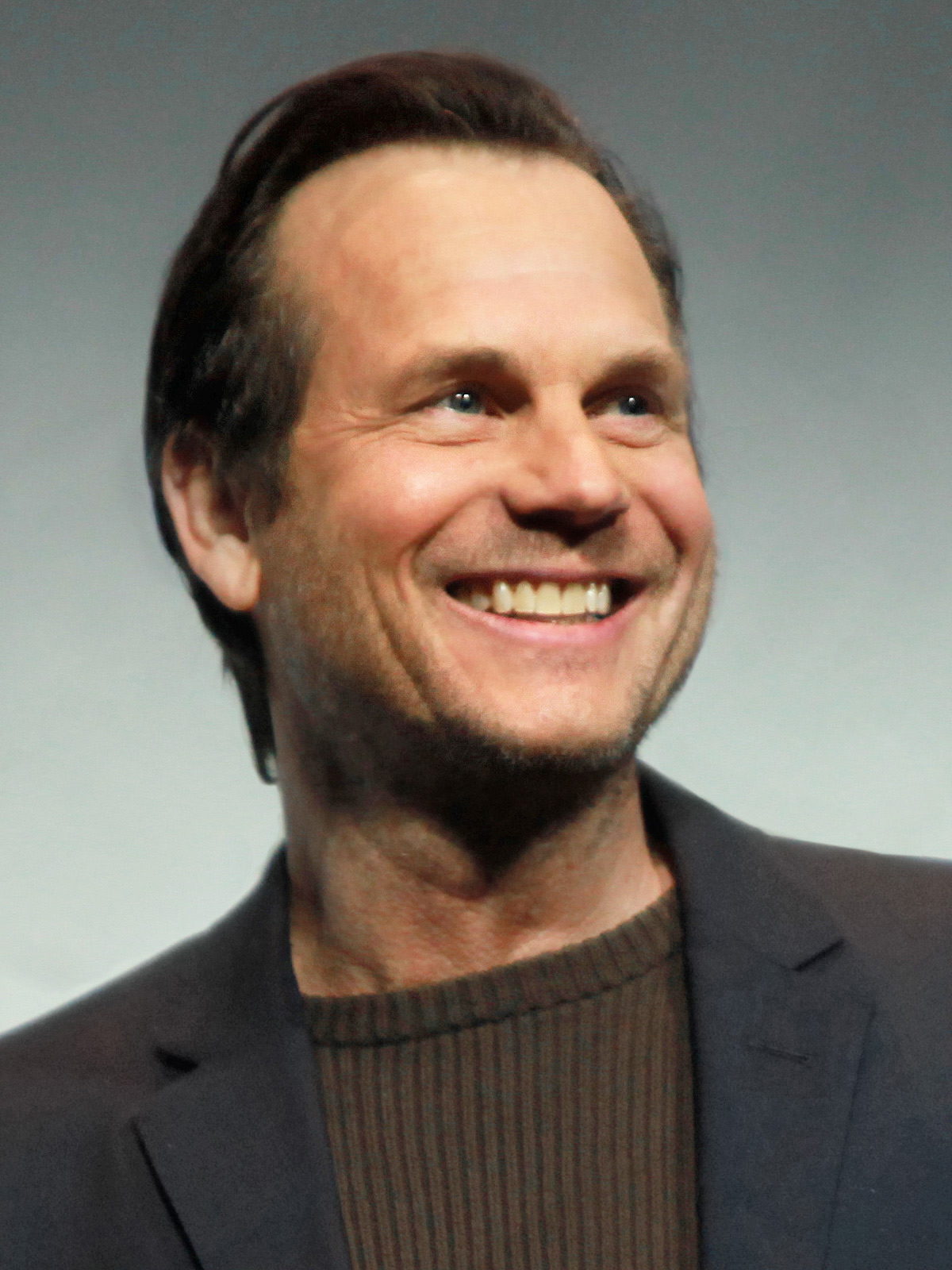
Helen Hunt (left) and Bill Paxton (right), who play lead roles in the film
- Helen Hunt as Jo Harding
  - Alexa Vega as Young Jo
- Bill Paxton as Bill Harding
- Jami Gertz as Dr. Melissa Reeves
- Cary Elwes as Jonas Miller
- Lois Smith as Aunt Meg
- Philip Seymour Hoffman as Dusty Davis
- Alan Ruck as Rabbit
- Sean Whalen as Sanders
- Scott Thomson as Preacher
- Todd Field as Beltzer
- Joey Slotnick as Joey
- Wendle Josepher as Haynes
- Jeremy Davies as Laurence
- Zach Grenier as Eddie
- Gregory Sporleder as Willie
- Patrick Fischler as Flanders
- Nicholas Sadler as Kubrick
- Ben Weber as Stanley
- Anthony Rapp as Tony
- Erik LaRay Harvey as Eric
- Abraham Benrubi as Bubba
- Jake Busey as mobile lab technician
- Richard Lineback as Mr. Thornton
- Rusty Schwimmer as Mrs. Thornton

== Production ==
=== Development and writing ===
Twister was produced by Steven Spielberg's Amblin Entertainment, with financial backing from Warner Bros. and Universal Pictures. In return, Warner Bros. was given the North American distribution rights, while Universal's joint-venture distribution company, United International Pictures (UIP), obtained international distribution rights. The pitch was not a script, but a proof of concept clip of the visual effects by Industrial Light & Magic, done entirely in computer-generated imagery and featuring a pickup truck driving towards a tornado pulling up a tractor, with one of its tires snapping off and smashing through the truck's windshield. ILM assigned Stefen Fangmeier to be the effects supervisor for his experience with tornadoes, having helped create simulations while working with storm chasers in the National Center for Supercomputing Applications.

Spielberg himself was originally attached to direct the project, and directors such as James Cameron, John Badham, Tim Burton, and Robert Zemeckis were also in talks to helm the film before Jan de Bont signed on to Twister after leaving Godzilla due to creative differences. De Bont was invited by Spielberg after the success of directorial debut Speed, which was released in 1994, following a long career as a director of photography, and described the project as "a Grimm fairy tale where the monster comes out of dark clouds". Michael Crichton and his wife and co-author, Anne-Marie Martin, were paid $2.5 million for a screenplay, which started being written in January 1994. Crichton said the two bases for the script were a PBS documentary about storm chasers and the plot of romantic comedy His Girl Friday, where a newspaper editor and his ex who is engaged to another man do one last job together. Two screenwriters would later sue the studios claiming Twister was taken from their ideas: Daniel Perkins, whose script Tornado Chasers dealt with the military harnessing tornadoes as weapons and settled for an undisclosed amount; and Stephen B. Kessler, author of a script about storm chasers in Oklahoma called Catch the Wind, and whose case was eventually dismissed. Dorothy was inspired by TOTO, an instrumented barrel-shaped device used to research tornadoes in the 1980s. De Bont pushed to make the dialogue "very energized" to reflect the excitement experienced by storm chasers, adding that the dialogue "gets very stilted very quickly" if it is not "moving forward and energized in the same pattern as the action", while encouraging the cast to improvise their lines. He also attempted to reduce the amount of establishing scenes and exposition "that makes a movie almost immediately less interesting" while feeling that "things will explain themselves as you keep watching", but the studio insisted on it. For the explanatory moments there was a focus on the character of Melissa, serving as an audience surrogate given she had no experience with storm chasing.

Helen Hunt was de Bont's first choice to play Jo Harding, and while the studio was reluctant because of her lack of big movie roles, he insisted, considering her a good actress who could deliver the physical demands of the role. Hunt initially was uninterested, declaring that "I just didn't know what I could really contribute acting-wise", but changed her mind after having lunch with de Bont and Spielberg at Amblin's offices. The casting of Hunt involved her dropping out of Broken Arrow. Tom Hanks read for the part of Bill Harding, but passed on the film. While on the set of Apollo 13, he recommended Bill Paxton to try for the role. De Bont wanted the storm chaser crew to resemble the ones he met during pre-production, a team of University of Oklahoma grad students. The National Severe Storms Laboratory (NSSL) in Norman, Oklahoma worked closely with the production, training the crew on weather safety, allowing the actors to visit their facilities and go along on a tornado chase, and providing consultations on the script that included discarding an impossible tornado that would last a day and a half to instead go for an outbreak of tornadoes, which could strike at any place at any time, in any location, and with different magnitudes.

=== Filming ===
The production was troubled with problems; Joss Whedon was brought in to rewrite the script through the early spring of 1994. When Whedon contracted bronchitis, Steven Zaillian was brought in to work on revisions. Whedon later returned and worked on revisions through the start of shooting in May 1995, then left the project after he got married. Two weeks into production, Jeff Nathanson was flown to the set and worked on the script until principal photography ended. Among the changes, Hunt complained that Jo and Melissa's interactions were "sort of catty with each other", prompting her to tell the producers "That's not gonna be fun to play or to watch. I'm not sure if I want to do that." After the Oklahoma City bombing occurred on April 19, 1995, filming of Twister was suspended while the cast and crew worked with relief efforts.

Filming was to originally take place in California, but De Bont insisted the film be shot on location in Oklahoma. Shooting occurred all over the state; several scenes, including the opening scene where the characters meet each other, and the first tornado chase in the Jeep pickup, were filmed in Fairfax and Ralston, Oklahoma. The scene at the automotive repair shop was filmed in Maysville and Norman. The waterspout scenes were filmed on Kaw Lake near Kaw City. The drive-in scene was filmed at a real drive-in theater in Guthrie, though some of the scene, such as Melissa's hotel room, was filmed in Stillwater near the Oklahoma State University campus. Stanley Kubrick's 1980 film The Shining was played during the sequence.

The real town of Wakita – serving as the hometown of Lois Smith's character, Meg, in the film – was used during filming, and a section of the older part of town was demolished for the scene, showing the aftermath of the F4 tornado that devastates the town. This location was selected after scouts discovered leftover debris from a major hailstorm that occurred two years earlier in June 1993. Most of the residents signed up as extras and were paid $100 per day. Additional scenes and B-roll were filmed near Ponca City and Pauls Valley, among several other smaller farm towns across the state. However, due to changing seasons that massively transformed the look of Oklahoma's topography, filming was moved to Iowa. The climactic scene with the F5 tornado was almost entirely shot around Eldora, Iowa, with the cornfield the characters run through located near Ames.

Halfway through filming, both Paxton and Hunt were temporarily blinded by bright electronic lamps used to make the sky behind the two actors look dark and stormy. Paxton remembers that "these things literally sunburned our eyeballs. I got back to my room, I couldn't see". To solve the problem, a Plexiglas filter was placed in front of the beams. The actors took eye drops and wore special glasses for a few days to recuperate. After filming in a particularly unsanitary ditch (for the first tornado chase scene, in which Bill and Jo are forced to shelter from an approaching tornado under a short bridge), Hunt and Paxton needed hepatitis shots. During the same sequence, Hunt repeatedly hit her head on a low wooden bridge, and was so exhausted from the demanding shoot that she stood up quickly and struck her head on a beam. During one stunt in which Hunt opened the door of a vehicle speeding through a cornfield, she momentarily let go of the door and it struck her on the side of the head. Some sources claim she received a concussion in the incident. De Bont said, "I love Helen to death, but you know, she can also be a little bit clumsy". She responded, "Clumsy? The guy burned my retinas, but I'm clumsy ... I thought I was a good sport. I don't know ultimately if Jan chalks me up as that or not, but one would hope so". Jo and Bill inside the F5 tornado was filmed by rolling the set in a gimbal so the ground stood in the ceiling as Hunt and Paxton hung from a metal bar, with the footage then being flipped upside down to appear as if they were being sucked upwards by the storm.

Bad weather was frequent during production, with hailstorms, lightning, floods, and mud. Some crew members, feeling that De Bont was "out of control", left the production five weeks into filming. The camera crew led by Don Burgess claimed De Bont "didn't know what he wanted till he saw it. He would shoot one direction, with all the equipment behind the view of the camera, and then he'd want to shoot in the other direction right away and we'd have to move [everything] and he'd get angry that we took too long ... and it was always everybody else's fault, never his". De Bont claims that they had to schedule at least three scenes every day because the weather changed so often, and "Don had trouble adjusting to that".

When De Bont, in a fit of rage, knocked over a camera assistant who missed a cue into a ditch and refused to apologize, Burgess and his crew walked off the set, much to the shock of the cast. They remained in place for one more week until Jack N. Green's crew agreed to replace them. Following the incident, Spielberg angrily flew down to Oklahoma to admonish De Bont for his behavior. Two days before principal filming ended, Green was injured when a hydraulic house set (used in the scene in which Jo and Bill rescue Meg and her dog Mose from her destroyed home in Wakita), designed to collapse on cue, was mistakenly activated with him inside it. A rigged ceiling hit him in the head and injured his back, requiring him to be hospitalized. De Bont took over as his own director of photography for the remaining shots.

Because overcast skies were not always available, De Bont had to shoot many of the film's tornado-chasing scenes in bright sunlight, requiring Industrial Light & Magic to more than double its original plan for 150 "digital sky-replacement" shots. Principal photography was originally given a deadline to allow Hunt to return to film the fourth season of her NBC sitcom Mad About You, but when shooting ran over schedule, series creator and co-star Paul Reiser agreed to delay the show's production for two and a half weeks so Twister could finish filming. De Bont insisted on using multiple cameras, which led to the exposure of 1.3 million feet (400,000 m) of film, compared to the usual maximum of 300,000 feet (91,000 m). The crew used a Boeing 707 airplane engine and smaller fans to generate wind throughout the film. Pickup trucks followed the actors' vehicles to throw debris, including ice pieces to simulate hail, made with an ice machine imported from a neighbor state as Oklahoma lacked them. Ford Motor Company tried to get their new 1997 F-150 as the main vehicle of the movie, but were beaten by Chrysler and their Dodge Ram 2500. Five Rams were provided, one of which was a prototype to be used in scenes where the vehicle suffered extensive damage, and the trucks went through 20 windshields as they were broken by the flying debris. Chrysler also provided eight Dodge Caravan minivans. The scene where a tornado drops tractors in the way of the protagonists' truck was achieved by dropping the combines from helicopters onto the road, and filming with longer lenses to make the distance seem very close when they were actually 20–30 feet (6.1–9.1 m) away.

=== Post-production ===
De Bont claimed that Twister cost close to $70 million, of which $2–3 million went to the director. Last-minute reshoots in March and April 1996 (to clarify a scene set in the 1960s about Jo as a child) and overtime requirements in post-production and at ILM, are thought to have raised the budget to $90 million.

During post-production of Twister, Spielberg took over directing duties on Minority Report instead of The Haunting, which ultimately was directed by de Bont.

The tornadoes in the film were created with computer animation. Particle system expert Habib Zargarpour used the software Dynamation to develop the basis for the digital tornadoes, consisting of millions of tiny particles that made up a spinning, fast-moving funnel cloud, which Zargarpour compared to packing together little scoops of ice cream. To create the sound of the tornadoes, De Bont had recorded a variety of combined sound effects, including lion roars, tiger growls, camel moans, and jet-engine wooshes. Other special effects that were animated with CGI included telephone poles, trees, trucks, tractors, and whole houses. The CGI cow was built from a CGI zebra from the 1995 CGI film Jumanji.

== Release ==
Twister was acclaimed for its visual effects, resulting in Academy Award nominations for both its sound and visuals.

=== Theatrical ===
Originally, Twister was set to be released on May 17, 1996. Warner Bros. eventually made the decision to push forward its release date to May 10, 1996, in order to avoid competition with Paramount's Mission: Impossible two weeks later. The premiere took place in Westwood, Los Angeles on May 8, 1996, and at the AMC Penn Square 10, then known as General Cinema Theatres at Penn Square Mall in Oklahoma City a day later on May 9, 1996. Jan de Bont, Bill Paxton, and Helen Hunt were at the mall for interviews. The film received a PG-13 rating from the Motion Picture Association of America due to "intense depiction of very bad weather". On August 30, 2024, Twister was re-released in theaters nationwide in 4DX, along with Twisters for one week only.

=== Home media ===
Twister was released on LaserDisc and VHS by Warner Home Video on October 1, 1996. It was the division's first home video release to be THX certified. A widescreen VHS release became available at the same time. There is a message by James Lee Witt, the then-head of the Federal Emergency Management Agency (FEMA) at the end of the film. By November 1996, it topped the number one spot in Billboard's top sales. The film was released on DVD on March 25, 1997, and was one of the first feature films to be released on the DVD format in US. The DVD release occurred eleven days before Twister made its United States pay-cable debut on HBO on April 5, 1997. Twister was then released on VHS by MCA/Universal Home Video through CIC Video in the UK on March 10, 1997, and July 14, 1997.

The film was re-released on DVD on June 6, 2000. Special features on this release include an audio commentary by Jan de Bont and Stefen Fangmeier to listen throughout the film, behind-the-scenes footage, trailers, and a Van Halen music video. Eight years later on May 6, 2008, a two-disc special edition DVD and Blu-ray were released. An HD DVD was then released on May 27, becoming one of the last HD DVDs to be ever released.

In January 2012, a triple feature Blu-ray pack with Twister, Poseidon, and The Perfect Storm was released.

The film was released on Ultra HD Blu-ray by Warner Bros. Home Entertainment with a new Dolby Atmos audio mix on July 9, 2024 and also a double feature Blu-ray and DVD with Twisters by the film's international distributor, Universal Pictures Home Entertainment, on October 22.

=== Soundtracks ===
Twister featured both a traditional orchestral film score composed by Mark Mancina, and a soundtrack of rock-music singles, many of which were exclusive releases for the film. Both the soundtrack and the orchestral score featured an instrumental theme song ("Respect the Wind") composed and performed for the film by Alex (his only recording outside of Van Halen) and Eddie Van Halen. The film's music was released on CD and cassette tape formats.

== Reception ==
=== Box office ===
Twister opened on May 10, 1996, earning $41.1 million from 2,414 total theaters during its opening weekend, and ranked in the number-one spot at the North American box office, beating both The Craft and The Truth About Cats & Dogs. Upon its release, the film topped The Birdcage to have the biggest 1996 opening. At that time, it had the fourth-largest opening weekend of any film, behind Batman Returns, Jurassic Park, and Batman Forever. Moreover, the film had the largest May opening weekend, dethroning the three-day record previously held by Lethal Weapon 3. It also had the highest non-holiday May opening weekend, a record that lasted until the 1998 release of Deep Impact.

The success of Twister helped the blockbusters of May officially begin the summer season. Similar openings would follow, such as that of Deep Impact in 1998 and The Mummy in 1999. Two years later in 2001, The Mummy Returns set a new precedent for the frame by unleashing an opening weekend of $68.1 million. Then in 2002, Sam Raimi's Spider-Man took the summer starter films to the next level with its $114.8 million opening weekend.

During its second weekend, Twister managed to top Flipper with an additional $37 million. It was ranked as the second-highest-grossing second weekend at the time, after Jurassic Park. The film suffered only a 10% second-weekend drop, making it the smallest decline for a non-holiday film. For 15 years, Twister held that record until it was surpassed by DreamWorks' Puss in Boots in 2011. By May 21, it reached the $100-million mark. Not too long after, the number-one spot was taken by Mission: Impossible, putting Twister into second place. Like its predecessor, the film had the largest May opening weekend. It went on to hold this record until 1997, when it was taken by The Lost World: Jurassic Park. As for Twister, it continued to stay in second place while beating out Dragonheart in its fourth weekend. When The Rock was released that June, the film was put into third place. It then approached $200 million by June 19, becoming the first film to do so since Forrest Gump. Twister fell into fifth place shortly after the releases of The Hunchback of Notre Dame and Eraser. After Independence Day was released in July, the film crossed over Ghostbusters to become the 13th-highest domestic grossing film of all time. It continued to dominate the box office, especially during the Summer Olympics in Atlanta, Georgia.

After 12 weeks of release, the film had earned $231.3 million and had become 12th-highest domestic grosser, surpassing The Empire Strikes Back. Twister went on to earn a total of $245.2 million at the North American box office, and $254 million internationally for a worldwide total of $499.2 million during its theatrical run. It became the second-highest-grossing film of 1996, behind Independence Day, and was the 10th-highest-grossing film in history at the time of its release, making it the most successful Warner Bros. film release, surpassing Batman. In 2001, Harry Potter and the Sorcerer's Stone broke Twister's record for being the highest-grossing Warner Bros. film of all time.

In China, Twister was the second-highest-grossing Hollywood film in the country, behind True Lies, making a total gross of CN¥54.5 million.

=== Critical response ===
On Rotten Tomatoes, Twister holds an approval rating of 68% based on 142 reviews, with an average rating of 6.9/10. The site's critics consensus reads: "A high-concept blockbuster that emphasizes special effects over three-dimensional characters, Twister's visceral thrills are often offset by the film's generic plot." On Metacritic, the film had a weighted average score of 68 out of 100, based on 19 critics, indicating "generally favorable reviews". Audiences polled by CinemaScore gave the film an average grade of "A−" on an A+ to F scale.

Roger Ebert gave the film two and a half stars out of four and wrote, "As drama, Twister resides in the Zone. It has no time to waste on character, situation, dialogue and nuance. The dramatic scenes are holding actions between tornadoes. As spectacle, however, Twister is impressive. The tornadoes are big, loud, violent and awesome, and they look great". In her review for The New York Times, Janet Maslin wrote, "Somehow Twister stays as up-tempo and exuberant as a roller-coaster ride, neatly avoiding the idea of real danger". Entertainment Weekly gave the film a "B" rating, and Lisa Schwarzbaum wrote, "Yet the images that linger longest in my memory are those of windswept livestock. And that, in a teacup, sums up everything that's right, and wrong, about this appealingly noisy but ultimately flyaway first blockbuster of summer". In his review for the Los Angeles Times, Kenneth Turan wrote, "But the ringmaster of this circus, the man without whom nothing would be possible, is director De Bont, who now must be considered Hollywood's top action specialist. An expert in making audiences squirm and twist, at making us feel the rush of experience right along with the actors, De Bont choreographs action and suspense so beautifully he makes it seem like a snap."

Neil Norman of London Evening Standard stated that "Twister outdoes Jurassic Park in its lack of narrative momentum, its incoherent logic, and its utter contempt for characterisation". Joanna Connors of Cleveland Plain Dealer wrote, "Crichton has unparalleled showman's instincts. He knows exactly what will sell on TV, in bookstores and at the movies, and what sells at the movies is what you can't create on TV: amusement-park thrills. So Twister delivers them. And how". Dennis King of Tulsa World earned a three and a half out of four scoring and said, "With its rippingly good special effects, its eerie and chilling sound, its clever touches of humor and pathos, and its full-tilt storytelling, Twister is the perfect amusement to set the summer movie season off with a bang". Barbara Creed of The Age explained that "Twister is great fun -- suspenseful, exciting, clever. The script, by Anne-Marie Martin and Michael Crichton, is extremely witty, particularly in relation to the team of techno-nerds who run after twisters like cowboys after steers". In a three out of five review, Bob Fenster of The Arizona Republic wrote, "No one's going to buy into the romantic bickering between the lead scientists or their rivalry team of evil meteorologists. Still, if you're hooked on high-voltage special effects, Twister will give you a charge". Time magazine's Richard Schickel wrote, "when action is never shown to have deadly or pitiable consequences, it tends toward abstraction. Pretty soon you're not tornado watching, you're special-effects watching". In his review for the Washington Post Desson Howe wrote, "it's a triumph of technology over storytelling and the actors' craft. Characters exist merely to tell a couple of jokes, cower in fear of downdrafts and otherwise kill time between tornadoes".

=== Accolades ===
Date	Award	Category	Recipients	Result	Ref.
1997	Blockbuster Entertainment Awards	Favorite Actress - Action/Adventure	Helen Hunt	Won	
1997	BMI Film & TV Awards	BMI Film Music Award	Mark Mancina	Won	
1997	Cinema Audio Society Awards	Outstanding Achievement in Sound Mixing for Feature Films	Steve Maslow, Gregg Landaker, Kevin O'Connell, Geoffrey Patterson	Nominated	
1997	Stinkers Bad Movie Awards	Worst Picture	Twister (Warner Bros.)	Nominated	
1997	Stinkers Bad Movie Awards	Worst Supporting Actress	Jami Gertz	Won	
1997	Stinkers Bad Movie Awards	Worst Screenplay for a Film Grossing Over $100M Using Hollywood Math	Twister (Warner Bros.), written by Michael Crichton and Anne-Marie Martin	Won	
January 15, 1997	Satellite Awards	Best Visual Effects	Stefen Fangmeier	Nominated	
March 23, 1997	Golden Raspberry Awards	Worst Supporting Actress	Jami Gertz	Nominated	
March 23, 1997	Golden Raspberry Awards	Worst Written Film Grossing Over $100 Million	Twister (Warner Bros.), written by Michael Crichton & Anne-Marie Martin	Won	
March 24, 1997	Academy Awards	Best Sound	Steve Maslow, Gregg Landaker, Kevin O'Connell, Geoffrey Patterson	Nominated	
March 24, 1997	Academy Awards	Best Visual Effects	Stefen Fangmeier, John Frazier, Henry LaBounta, Habib Zargarpour	Nominated	
April 19, 1997	Nickelodeon Kids' Choice Awards	Favorite Movie	Twister	Nominated	
April 29, 1997	British Academy Film Awards	Best Special Visual Effects	Stefen Fangmeier, John Frazier, Henry LaBounta, Habib Zargarpour	Won	
June 7, 1997	MTV Movie & TV Awards	Best Female Performance	Helen Hunt	Nominated	
June 7, 1997	MTV Movie & TV Awards	Best Action Sequence	Truck Drives Through Farm Equipment	Won	
July 23, 1997	Saturn Awards	Best Action/Adventure/Thriller Film	Twister	Nominated	
July 23, 1997	Saturn Awards	Best Actor	Bill Paxton	Nominated	
July 23, 1997	Saturn Awards	Best Actress	Helent Hunt	Nominated	
July 23, 1997	Saturn Awards	Best Visual Effects	Stefen Fangmeier, John Frazier, Henry LaBounta, Habib Zargarpour	Nominated	

== Legacy ==
Following the success and popularity of Twister, the Hollywood industry modernized the disaster film genre by shifting the threat from human-made blunders or confined spaces to unstoppable, wide-scale meteorological anomalies. The disaster elements in both Twister and Independence Day represented a significant turning point for major blockbusters, and with advancements in CGI special effects, events depicting mass destruction became ordinary in later films. Twister was also responsible for the resurgence of disaster films in the years that followed, most notably Daylight, Dante's Peak, Volcano, Titanic, Deep Impact, Armageddon, The Perfect Storm, The Core, The Day After Tomorrow, War of the Worlds, and 2012.

On May 24, 1996, a tornado destroyed Screen No. 3 at the Can-View Drive-In, a drive-in theater in Thorold, Ontario, which was scheduled to show Twister later that evening, in a real-life parallel to a scene in the film in which a tornado destroys a drive-in during a showing of the film The Shining. The facts of this incident were exaggerated into an urban legend that the theater was actually playing Twister during the tornado. On July 4, 1996, a tornado blew down the screen at the Sundown Drive-In theatre in Saskatoon, Saskatchewan, where Twister was scheduled to show.

On May 10, 2010, the 14th anniversary of the film's U.S. release, a tornado struck Fairfax, Oklahoma, destroying the farmhouse where numerous scenes in Twister were shot. J. Berry Harrison, the owner of the home and a former Oklahoma state senator, commented that the tornado appeared eerily similar to the fictitious one in the film. He had lived in the home since 1978.

Following the film's release, the number of meteorological majors in the United States increased by about 10 percent in the late 1990s. The University of Oklahoma, which collaborated with production, in particular saw its meteorology program double from 225 enrolled to 450, and a grant from Universal Studios allowed development of a mobile radar. Universal also funded the NSSL meteorologists to go on a mobile tour in the eastern half of the country, staging safety presentations at science museums in a dozen major cities. Storm chasing increased even as a recreational activity, with tourism companies creating "chase tours". Bill Paxton later narrated storm chaser Sean Casey's 2011 documentary Tornado Alley. After the death of Paxton on February 25, 2017, hundreds of storm chasers and users of the Spotter Network used their markers to spell out his initials across the states of Texas, Kansas, and Oklahoma in tribute to Paxton, citing that the movie was the inspiration for many of them to pursue storm chasing and meteorology.

A Twister museum in Wakita, Oklahoma, where many of the particularly destructive scenes of the movie were shot, contains various memorabilia and artifacts related to the film.

== In other media ==
=== Pinball ===
On April 3, 1996, Sega Pinball released Twister, a pinball machine themed to the film. It features modes including Canister Multiball, Chase Multiball, Multibull, and more.

=== Theme park attraction ===
Twister was used as the basis for the attraction Twister...Ride It Out at Universal Studios Florida, which features filmed introductions by Paxton and Hunt. The attraction opened on May 4, 1998, and closed on November 1, 2015, to make way for Race Through New York Starring Jimmy Fallon. The windows of the New York facade pay tribute to Twister...Ride it Out with references to the film and Paxton.

=== Book tie-in ===
The film's original screenplay, written by Crichton and then-wife Anne Marie Martin, was released as a mass-market paperback in conjunction with the film.

== Sequel ==
In June 2020, a remake was announced to be in development from the original film's international distributor, Universal Pictures, with Joseph Kosinski in early negotiations to serve as director. Frank Marshall and Sara Scott were set to serve as producers on the project. Around the same time, Hunt had pitched a direct-sequel to the original film, with a script she co-authored with Daveed Diggs and Rafael Casal. She had intended to serve as director in addition to reprising her starring role in the cast, but the studio ultimately passed on their script. She said in an interview, "I tried to get it made, with Daveed [Diggs] and Rafael [Casal] and me writing it, and all Black and brown storm chasers, and they wouldn't do it. I was going to direct it... We could barely get a meeting, and this is in June of 2020 when it was all about diversity. It would have been so cool".

After Steven Spielberg read the script by Mark L. Smith, his enthusiasm contributed to getting the project green-lit. In October 2022, it was announced that the project was officially titled Twisters, and Lee Isaac Chung was hired to direct. The project is a joint-venture production between Universal, Warner Bros., and Amblin, with Universal handling US and Canadian distribution and Warner handling worldwide distribution. The film was released internationally on July 10, 2024, and in the United States on July 19, 2024.

== See also ==
- Night of the Twisters: A 1996 telemovie based on the 1984 novel of the same name by Ivy Ruckman
- Into the Storm: A film released in 2014, with a similar film plot to Twister.
- 1999 Oklahoma tornado outbreak
- TOtable Tornado Observatory: A device used to monitor tornadoes in the 80's that was the inspiration for Dorothy 1–4.
- History of tornado research
