= John Grower =

John Grower is a special effects pioneer who was the post-production art director on Tron for Walt Disney Pictures. Later, he was the supervisor of special effects at Robert Abel and Associates, and director of production at Wavefront Technologies (which later merged to form Alias).

He then formed his own special effects studio, Santa Barbara Studios, in 1990.
