= Ruben A. Aquino =

American animator (born 1953)

- Born: Ruben Azama Aquino
- Occupation: Animator
- Years active: 1975–present
- Employer: Walt Disney Animation Studios (1982–2013; 2023)

Ruben Azama Aquino is an American Disney animator who formerly worked at Walt Disney Animation Studios. His work has included several Disney characters, including Maurice in Beauty and the Beast, Simba as an adult in The Lion King, Chief Powhatan in Pocahontas, Li Shang and Fa Li in Mulan, Pleakly and David Kawena in Lilo & Stitch, Denahi in Brother Bear, Mildred and Mr. Willerstein in Meet the Robinsons and Eudora and James in The Princess and the Frog. His style is easily recognized by his powerful figures and his extremely geometric facial movements.

== Professional career ==
From 1975 to 1979, Ruben worked as a graphic artist in Honolulu, Hawaii. He worked for Farmhouse Films as a trainee, which was his first job in animation.

After moving to Los Angeles in 1980, he worked for Hanna-Barbera in visual development, character design, and layout. He was laid off after a year.

Months later, he was able to enter Walt Disney Feature Animation's clean-up training program and after completing it, he worked on a 30-second animation test of Fflewddur Fflam in The Black Cauldron and submitted it to the review board. He was promoted to animating assistant and worked for Disney from 1982 until 2013.

== Filmography ==
Year	Title	Credits	Characters	Notes
1981	Laverne & Shirley in the Army (TV series)	Character Designer - 1 Episode		End Credited and Known as Ruben Aquino
1981	The Fonz and the Happy Days Gang (TV series)	Character Designer - 11 Episodes		End Credited and Known as Ruben Aquino
1985	The Black Cauldron	Animator		End Credited and Known as Ruben Aquino
1986	The Great Mouse Detective	Character Animator		
1987	Oilspot and Lipstick (Short)	Animator		
1988	Mac and Me	Alien Designer		End Credited and Known as Ruben Aquino
1988	Oliver & Company	Supervising Animator		
1989	The Little Mermaid	Supervising Animator		End Credited and Known as Ruben Aquino
1990	The Rescuers Down Under	Supervising Animator		
1991	Beauty and the Beast	Supervising Animator	Maurice	
1994	The Lion King	Supervising Animator	Adult Simba	End Credited and Known as Ruben Aquino
1994	The Lion King (video game)	Special Thanks		End Credited and Known as Ruben Aquino
1995	Pocahontas	Supervising Animator	Chief Powhatan	
1996	The Hunchback of Notre Dame	Additional Animator		
1998	Mulan	Supervising Animator	Li Shang And Fa Li	
1999	Tarzan	Additional Animator		
2000	Fantasia 2000	Additional Animator		
2002	Lilo & Stitch	Supervising Animator	Pleakly And David Kawena	
2003	Brother Bear	Supervising Animator	Denahi	
2007	Meet the Robinsons	Supervising Animator	Mildred and Mr. Willerstein	End Credited and Known As Ruben Azama Aquino
2009	The Princess and the Frog	Supervising Animator	Eudora And James	End Credited and Known As Ruben Azama Aquino
2011	The Ballad of Nessie (short)	Animator		
2011	Winnie the Pooh	Animator		End Credited and Known as Ruben Azama Aquino
2013	Wild About Safety: Timon and Pumbaa Safety Smart Honest & Real! (short)	Animator		End Credited and Known as Ruben Azama Aquino
2013	Frozen	Additional Visual Development Artist		
2015	Pups of Liberty: The Dog-claration of Independence (Short)	Supervising Animator		
2016	The Land Before Time: Journey of the Brave (Video)	Character Designer / Character Animator		
2018	Curious George (TV Series)	Additional Character Designer - 1 episode		
2019	Curious George: Royal Monkey (Video)	Character Designer		End Credited and Known as Ruben Aquino
2023	Once Upon a Studio (Short)	Animator		
