= Computer Animation Production System =

Computer-assisted animation production system

Computer Animation Production System (CAPS)
- Formerly: CAPS
- Type: Animation; Computer animation
- Predecessor: Walt Disney Feature Animation; Pixar
- Founded: 1989; 37 years ago
- Defunct: 2006; 20 years ago

The Computer Animation Production System (CAPS) was a proprietary collection of software, scanning camera systems, servers, networked computer workstations, and custom desks developed by Walt Disney and Pixar in the late 1980s. Although outmoded by the mid-2000s, it succeeded in reducing labor costs for ink-and-paint and post-production processes of traditionally animated feature films produced by Walt Disney Animation Studios (formerly known as Walt Disney Feature Animation). It also provided an entirely new palette of digital tools to animation filmmakers.

== History and evolution ==
The Computer Graphics Lab at the New York Institute of Technology developed a "scan and paint" system for cel animation in the late 1970s. It was used to produce a 22-minute computer-animated television show called Measure for Measure. Industry developments with computer systems led Marc Levoy of Cornell University and Hanna-Barbera Productions to develop a video animation system for cartoons in the early 1980s.

The first usage of the CAPS process was Mickey standing on Epcot's Spaceship Earth for "The Magical World of Disney" titles. The system's first feature film test was in the production of The Little Mermaid in 1989 where it was used in a single shot of the rainbow sequence at the end of the film. After Mermaid, films were made completely using CAPS; the first of these, The Rescuers Down Under, was the first fully digital feature film. Later films, including Beauty and the Beast, Aladdin, The Lion King, and The Hunchback of Notre Dame took more advantage of CAPS' 2-D and 3-D integration.

In the early days of CAPS, Disney chose not to discuss the system in public, being afraid that "the magic would go away" if people found out that computers were involved. Computer Graphics World magazine, in 1994, was the first to have a look at the process.

== Awards ==
In 1992, the team that developed CAPS won an Academy of Motion Picture Arts and Sciences Scientific and Engineering Award. They were:

- Randy Cartwright (Disney)
- David B. Coons (Disney)
- Lemuel Davis (Disney)
- Thomas Hahn (Pixar)
- James Houston (Disney)
- Mark Kimball (Disney)
- Dylan W. Kohler (Disney)
- Peter Nye (Pixar)
- Michael Shantzis (Pixar)
- David F. Wolf (Disney)
- Walt Disney Animation Studios Department

== Technical capabilities ==
CAPS was a digital ink and paint system used in animated feature films, the first at a major studio. Using CAPS, enclosed areas and lines could be easily colored in a computer environment using an unlimited palette. This replaced the expensive process of transferring animated drawings to cels using India ink or xerographic technology, and painting the reverse sides of the cels with gouache paint. It also allowed for sophisticated new techniques such as transparent shading and blended colors.

The completed digital cels were composited over scanned background paintings, and camera or pan movements were programmed into a computer exposure sheet simulating the actions of old-style animation cameras. Additionally, complex multiplane shots giving a sense of depth were possible. Unlike the analog multiplane camera, the CAPS multiplane cameras were not limited by artwork size. Extensive camera movements never before seen were incorporated into the films. The final version of the sequence was composited and recorded onto film.

=== CGI integration ===
Since the animation elements existed digitally, it was easy to integrate other types of film and video elements, including three-dimensional computer animation. CGI in hand-drawn animation had been used for some years, but it first had to be plotted onto individual sheets of punched paper, one frame at a time, cleaned up and transferred to animation cels using xerography, and was then photographed by an animation camera. With CAPS, CGI could be included directly into the movie without the requirements of being plotted on paper first.

CAPS was capable of a high level of image quality using significantly slower computer systems than are available today. The final frames were rendered at a 2K digital film resolution (2048 x 1234 pixels at a 1.66:1 aspect ratio), and the artwork was scanned so that it always held 100% resolution in the final output, no matter how complex the camera motion in the shot. Using the Pixar Image Computer, images were stored at 48-bits per pixel. The compositing system allowed complex multi-layered shots that was used almost immediately in The Rescuers Down Under to create a 400-layer opening dolly shot. DALS (Disney Animation Logistics System) made use of one of the first large-scale, custom RAID systems in the film industry.

== Decline and eventual replacement ==
Treasure Planet (2002) and Home on the Range (2004) under-performed financially in their theatrical runs. This, combined with the success of CGI-animated feature films from Pixar Animation Studios and competitor DreamWorks Animation, eventually prompted Walt Disney Feature Animation's management team to close down their traditional 2-D animation department in 2004. The CAPS desks were removed and the custom automated scanning cameras were dismantled and officially scrapped. By 2005, only one desk system remained, and that was only for reading the data for the films that had been made with CAPS.

In 2007, John Lasseter became the studio's new head of the management team and called for the 2-D animation unit's reopening. Rather than return to CAPS, however, Disney's subsequent traditionally animated feature and short film production projects How to Hook Up Your Home Theater (2007), The Princess and the Frog (2009), The Ballad of Nessie (2011), and Winnie the Pooh (2011) were produced using Toon Boom Animation's Toon Boom Harmony commercial animation computer software, which offered a more up-to-date modern contemporary digital animation system.

== Disney animated projects produced using CAPS ==
=== Feature films ===
- The Little Mermaid (1989) (ending scene)
- The Rescuers Down Under (1990)
- Beauty and the Beast (1991)
- Aladdin (1992)
- Hocus Pocus (1993)
- The Nightmare Before Christmas (1993)
- The Lion King (1994)
- Pocahontas (1995)
- The Hunchback of Notre Dame (1996)
- Hercules (1997)
- Mulan (1998)
- Tarzan (1999)
- Fantasia 2000 (1999)
- The Emperor's New Groove (2000)
- Atlantis: The Lost Empire (2001)
- Lilo & Stitch (2002)
- Treasure Planet (2002)
- Brother Bear (2003)
- Home on the Range (2004)

=== Short films ===
- Off His Rockers (1992)
- Trail Mix-Up (1993)
- Runaway Brain (1995)
- John Henry (2000)
- Destino (2003)
- Lorenzo (2004)
- The Little Matchgirl (2006)
