= PowerAnimator =

3D computer graphics software

Alias Research (Software)
- Developer: Alias Systems Corporation
- Release: 1988; 38 years ago
- Stable release: 9.0.2 / July 22, 1999; 27 years ago
- Operating system: IRIX, AIX
- Type: Computer graphics
- License: Proprietary
- Website: www.alias.com/products/maya/

PowerAnimator and Animator, also referred to simply as "Alias", the precursor to what is now Maya and StudioTools, is a highly integrated industrial 3D modeling, visual effects, and animation suite. It had a relatively long track record, starting with Technological Threat in 1988 and ending in Pokémon: the Movie 2000 in 1999. PowerAnimator ran natively on MIPS-based SGI IRIX and IBM AIX systems.

== History ==
PowerAnimator was launched in 1988.

In 1997, John Gibson, Rob Krieger, Milan Novacek, Glen Ozymok, and Dave Springer were presented with the Scientific and Engineering Award for their contributions to the geometric modeling component of the PowerAnimator system. The citation was:

"The Alias PowerAnimator system is widely regarded in the computer animation field as one of the best commercially available software packages for digital geometric modeling. Used by many motion picture visual effects houses, it has been a benchmark for comparison of modeling tools and has had a major influence on visual effects and animation."

== Television and film ==
Alias PowerAnimator 9.0 scene showing dynamic attributes used in VFX

PowerAnimator was used to create the water creature in the 1989 film The Abyss, as well as the T-1000 character in Terminator 2: Judgment Day, at a cost of $460,000 per minute. It was also used heavily for the many visual effects of the 1996 film Independence Day. PowerAnimator also served as the solution used to produce South Park episodes digitally before production was moved to Maya starting with Season 5.

== Game development ==
PowerAnimator was also used in game development, in particular as a part of Nintendo 64's SGI-based developer kit. It saw some use for modeling, texturing, visual effects, and animation for other titles and platforms as well.

Notable titles:

- Crash Bandicoot
- Casper
- Wing Commander III: Heart of the Tiger
- Wing Commander IV: The Price of Freedom
- Quake
- Oddworld: Abe's Oddysee
