= The Advanced Visualizer =

3D graphics software package

The Advanced Visualizer (TAV), a 3D graphics software package, was the flagship product of Wavefront Technologies from the mid 1980s until the late 1990s.

== History ==
The Advanced Visualizer was a package famous for its use in the production of numerous Oscar-winning movies such as The Abyss, Terminator 2: Judgment Day and Jurassic Park.

=== Alias|Wavefront Merger ===
This merger was widely seen as the result of Microsoft purchasing Softimage in an attempt to take over the 3D computer graphics market. Silicon Graphics responded by purchasing Alias Systems Corporation, and their two major competitors, Wavefront, and the French company TDI (Thomson Digital Images) for their Explore, IPR, and GUI technologies on February 7, 1995. Thus SGI created the super-company Alias|Wavefront.

Wavefront's programmers continued to reside in California but the management of the company was carried out in Toronto, Canada.

=== Autodesk Era ===
In 1996 Alias|Wavefront announced the release of Maya which incorporated aspects of all 3 software suites, which released in February 1998.

Wavefront was renamed to Alias Technologies in 2003 and was acquired by Autodesk in 2005. Some of the technology under Autodesk's ownership is still sold today as part of Maya.

== Architecture ==
In contrast to many modern day (2011) computer graphics animation software, TAV was a set of independent programs that each focused on one aspect of image synthesis as opposed to a monolithic product. The collection of these smaller programs formed the entire suite based on simple interchange of mostly ASCII file formats such as OBJ.

The major components of the TAV software suite included: Model, Paint, Dynamation, Kinemation, Preview, and fcheck. Composer was also available as an add-on for compositing of imagery. Many primitive utility programs such as graphics conversion were included in the toolkit and were frequently employed for batch processing via shell scripts.

The modular nature allowed these loosely coupled lightweight programs to start-up quickly with relatively small memory footprints. It was not uncommon to run several instances of the Model or Preview package, each working on different aspects of the same project.

As TAV only ran on the Silicon Graphics platform it enjoyed significant performance advantages over software-only based solutions due to its use of SGI's specialized graphics hardware supporting IrisGL, a precursor to OpenGL.

=== Component programs ===
fcheck - or 'Frame Check' is an image sequence viewer. fcheck loaded image files from disk into RAM and played them back at monitor synced frame rates for real time playback evaluation. It features the ability to view the RGBA (and Z-depth in the case of RLA) channels independently, variable frame rate and the ability to draw directly into the buffer. This program still ships with Maya.

Model - a polygon and patch 3d modeler. It read and wrote OBJ files. It also had the ability to manipulate UVs, Normals and assign material associations saved in the MTL file format. Included a command language for automation in the form of scripts, or aliases. Since there was no 'undo' feature, a common automated sequence would copy data to a spare place before modifying it - in essence, the users made their own 'undo'. Alongside direct manipulation of the vertex data, procedural deformers were available to sculpt the surfaces using common geometric transformations such as 'bend'.

Paint was an image editing program for manipulation of bitmap graphics - its texture map support focused on the RLA, SGI, Cineon (now DPX) and TIFF file formats. Support for 16 bit integer textures, sequencing capabilities for rotoscoping in addition to paint cloning from adjacent frames in the timeline.

Dynamation was a particle animation and rendering program capable of importing an OBJ to interact with. It accomplished native rendering using a hardware render buffer featuring a z-buffer. It drove the animations using a combination of predefined field objects & programmatic 'expressions' as well as rigid body mesh collision support. This technology is still being used in the Maya product today.

Preview was animation package that referenced OBJ files from disk, managed hierarchies and assigned animated channel data to attributes such as translation and rotation. It allowed association of primitive non-linear deformations such as bends and waves to geometry. It lacked a native undo feature. Like Model, included a command language that allowed for alias, or script development to automate tasks such as 'undo'. Other features included placement and preview of lights, manipulation of OBJ MTL files, and facilitation of scanline or wire frame rendering via an external render module. A unique feature to draw every Nth polygon of a model, was essential for visualizing animation of 'heavy' scenes during manipulation.

Render featured raytraced-shadows, raytraced reflections, transparency, texture maps, bump mapping, Lambert and Phong shading models.

Kinemation - an 'advanced' animation system that allowed for the manipulation of geometry using Inverse Kinematics (IK), geometric skinning to 'bones' featuring lattice based deformations. The deformed meshes were exported a series of OBJ's read into preview for assembly with other scene components. In 1995, Wired described Kinemation as "a huge breakthrough in motion animation". It was used in the mid-1990s by companies such as Kleiser-Walczak Construction Company (Judge Dredd). Portions of Kinemation were disassembled and re-assembled into Alias|Wavefront's flagship product Maya in 1997.

Composer, though not an initial member of the family, is a time-line based (similar to after effects) compositing and editing system with color corrections, keying, convolution filters, and animation capabilities. It supported 8 and 16 bit file formats as well as Cineon and early 'movie' file formats such as SGI movie, Indeo, MPEG video and QuickTime.
