= Autodesk Maya =

3D computer graphics software

- Original author: Alias Systems Corporation
- Developer: Autodesk, Inc.
- Release: February 1, 1998; 28 years ago
- Stable release: 2027 / March 25, 2026; 7 months ago
- Written in: C++, MEL, Python, C#
- Operating system: Windows, macOS, Linux (RHEL/Rocky Linux)
- Platform: x86-64, Apple silicon
- Available in: English, Japanese, Simplified Chinese
- Type: 3D computer graphics
- License: Trialware
- Website: autodesk.com/products/maya/overview

Autodesk Maya, commonly shortened to just Maya (/ˈmaɪə/; MY-ə), is a 3D computer graphics application that runs on Windows, macOS, and Linux, originally developed by Alias and currently owned and developed by Autodesk. It is used to create digital assets for interactive 3D applications (including video games), animated films, TV series, and visual effects.

== History ==
Maya was originally an animation product based on codebase from The Advanced Visualizer by Wavefront Technologies, Thomson Digital Image (TDI) Explore, PowerAnimator by Alias, and Alias Sketch!. The IRIX-based projects were combined and animation features were added; the project codename was Maya. Walt Disney Animation Studios collaborated with Maya's development during its production of Dinosaur. Disney requested that the user interface of the application be customizable to allow for a personalized workflow. This was a particular influence in the open architecture of Maya, and partly responsible for its popularity in the animation industry.

After Silicon Graphics Inc. had acquired both Alias and Wavefront Technologies, Inc. in 1995, Wavefront's technology (then under development) was merged into Maya. SGI's acquisition was a response to Microsoft Corporation acquiring Softimage 3D in 1994. The new wholly owned subsidiary was named "Alias$|$Wavefront".

In the early days of development Maya started with Tcl as the scripting language, in order to leverage its similarity to a Unix shell script language, but after the merger with Wavefront it was replaced with Maya Embedded Language (MEL). Sophia, the scripting language in Wavefront's Dynamation, was chosen as the basis of MEL.

Maya 1.0 was released in February 1998. Following a series of acquisitions, Maya was bought by Autodesk in October 2005. Under the name of the new parent company, Maya was renamed Autodesk Maya. However, the name "Maya" continues to be the dominant name used for the product.

== Release history ==
Major Version Name	Date	Sub-versions	Major change	Operating System
A|W Maya 1.0	Feb 1998	1.0.1 (Jun 1998)		SGI IRIX; Windows
A|W Maya 1.5	Oct 1998		IRIX only	SGI IRIX
A|W Maya 2.0	Jun 1999			SGI IRIX; Windows
A|W Maya 2.5	Nov 1999	2.5.2 (Mar 2000)		SGI IRIX; Windows
A|W Maya 3.0	Feb 2000	3.0.1 (Jan 2001)	First Linux version	SGI IRIX; Windows; Linux
A|W Maya 3.5	Oct 2001	3.5.1 (Sep 2002)	macOS only	macOS
A|W Maya 4.0	Jun 2001	4.0.2 (May 2002)	No macOS version	SGI IRIX; Windows; Linux
A|W Maya 4.5	Jul 2002			SGI IRIX; Windows; Linux macOS
A|W Maya 5.0	May 2003	5.0.1 (Oct 2003)	Mental Ray	SGI IRIX; Windows; Linux macOS
Alias Maya 6.0	May 2004	6.0.1 (Aug 2004)		SGI IRIX; Windows; Linux macOS
Alias Maya 6.5	Jan 2005	6.5.1 (Dec 2005)	Final IRIX version	SGI IRIX; Windows; Linux macOS
Alias Maya 7.0	Aug 2005	7.0.1 (Dec 2005)		Windows; Linux macOS
Autodesk Maya 8.0	Aug 2006		First 64-bit First Autodesk version	Windows; Linux macOS
Autodesk Maya 8.5	Jan 2007	Service Pack 1 (Jun 2007)	Intel-based macOS; Python API; Nucleus Solver	Windows; Linux macOS
Autodesk Maya 2008 ver. 9.0	Sep 2007	SP1, ver. 9.0.1 (Mar 2008); Extension 2, ver. 9.0.1 (Feb 2008); Extension 1, ver. 9 (Dec 2007)	Software versioning numbering scheme becomes year-based	Windows; Linux macOS
Autodesk Maya 2009 ver. 10	Aug 2008	Service Pack 1, ver. 10 (Apr-2009)	Unified "Complete" and "Unlimited" editions	Windows; Linux macOS
Autodesk Maya 2010	Aug 2009			Windows; Linux macOS
Autodesk Maya 2011	April 2010	Service Pack 1 (Sep 2010); Subscription Advantage Pack (Sep 2010); Hotfix 3 (Jul 2010); Hotfix 2 (Jun 2010); Hotfix 1 (May 2010)	PyMel 1.0 Qt-based user interface	Windows; Linux macOS
Autodesk Maya 2012	March 2011	Service Pack 2 (25. Jan 2012); Service Pack 1 (Oct 2011); Hotfix1,2,3,4 (Apr-Aug 2011)	Nvidia PhysX; Viewport 2.0; Python API 2.0	Windows; Linux macOS
Autodesk Maya 2013	Mar 2012	Service Pack 2 (Oct 2012); Service Path 1 Refix (Jul 2012); Service Pack 1 (Jun 2012)	NHair; Bullet Physics Library; Alembic; Node Editor	Windows; Linux macOS
Autodesk Maya 2014	Mar 2013	SP1 Extension (Oct 2013) Service Pack 1 (Jun 2013)		Windows; Linux macOS
Autodesk Maya 2015	Aug. 2014	SP2 (May 2014)	Python 2.7.x	Windows; Linux macOS
Autodesk Maya 2016	Mar 2015	Extension 1 SP7 (May 2019); Service Pack 7 (May 2019); Extension 2 SP2 (Sep 2016); Extension 2 (Apr 2016); Extension 1 (Apr 2016); Service Pack 6 (Apr 2016); Service Pack 5 (Dec 2015); Service Pack 4 (Oct 2015); Service Pack 3 (Sep 2015); Service Pack 2 (Aug 2015); Service Pack 1 (Jun 2015)	XGen; Bifrost	Windows; Linux macOS
Autodesk Maya 2017	Jul 2016	Update 5 (Nov 2017); Update 4 (Jun 2017); Update 3 (Feb 2017); Update 2 (Nov 2016); Update 1 (Sep 2016)		Windows; Linux macOS
Autodesk Maya 2018	Jul 2017	2018.7 (Apr 2020); 2018.6 (Apr 2019); 2018.5 (Nov 2018); 2018.4 (Jul 2018); 2018.3 (May 2018); 2018.2 (Dec 2017); 2018.1 (Sep 2017)	MASH	Windows; Linux macOS
Autodesk Maya 2019	Jan 2019	2019.3.1 (Apr 2020); 2019.3 (Apr 2020); 2019.2 (Jul 2019); 2019.1 (May 2019)		Windows; Linux macOS
Autodesk Maya 2020	Dec 2019	2020.4 (Dec 2020); 2020.3 (Oct 2020); 2020.2 (May 2020); 2020.1 (Mar 2020)		Windows; Linux macOS
Autodesk Maya 2022	Mar 2021	2022.5.1; 2022.5; 2022.4; 2022.3; 2022.2; 2022.1	USD support OpenColorIO; Python 3.7.x	Windows; Linux macOS
Autodesk Maya 2023	Sep 2022	2023.3.1; 2023.3; 2023.2; 2023.1	Boolean overhaul Sweep mesh	Windows; Linux macOS
Autodesk Maya 2024	Mar 2023	2024.2; 2024.1; 2024.0.1	LookdevX; Substance 2.3.2; Native Apple silicon support	Windows; Linux macOS
Autodesk Maya 2025	Aug 2024	2025.3.1; 2025.3; 2025.2; 2025.1		Windows; Linux macOS
Autodesk Maya 2026	Mar 2025	2026.3; 2026.2; 2026.1	OpenPBR material by default	Windows; Linux macOS
Autodesk Maya 2027	Mar 2026			Windows; Linux macOS

== Overview ==
Maya is an application used to generate 3D assets for use in the film, television, video game, and advertising industries. The software was initially released for the IRIX operating system. However, this support was discontinued in August 2005 after the release of version 6.5. Maya was available in both "Complete" and "Unlimited" editions until August 2008, when it was turned into a single suite.

Users define a virtual workspace (scene) to implement and edit media of a particular project. Scenes can be saved in a variety of formats, the default being .mb (Maya Binary). Maya exposes a node graph architecture. Scene elements are node-based, each node having its own attributes and customization. As a result, the visual representation of a scene is based entirely on a network of interconnecting nodes, depending on each other's information. For the convenience of viewing these networks, there is a dependency graph and a directed acyclic graph.

Assets created with Maya can be imported to game engines such as Unreal Engine and Unity.

== Industry usage ==
The widespread use of Maya in the film industry is usually associated with its development on the film Dinosaur, released by Disney and The Secret Lab on May 19, 2000. In 2003, when Alias|Wavefront received an Academy Award for Technical Achievement, it was noted to be used in films such as The Lord of the Rings: The Two Towers, Spider-Man, Ice Age, and Star Wars: Episode II – Attack of the Clones, all of which were released in 2002. By 2015, VentureBeat Magazine stated that all ten films in consideration for the Best Visual Effects Academy Award had used Autodesk Maya and that it had been "used on every winning film since 1997."

== Awards ==
On March 1, 2003, Alias was given an Academy Award for Technical Achievement by the Academy of Motion Picture Arts and Sciences for scientific and technical achievement for their development of Maya software.

In 2005, while working for Alias|Wavefront, Jos Stam shared an Academy Award for Technical Achievement with Edwin Catmull and Tony DeRose for their invention and application of subdivision surfaces.

On February 8, 2008, Duncan Brinsmead, Jos Stam, Julia Pakalns and Martin Werner received an Academy Award for Technical Achievement for the design and implementation of the Maya Fluid Effects system.

== See also ==
- List of Maya plugins
- Comparison of 3D computer graphics software
- PowerAnimator
- Autodesk 3ds Max
- Autodesk Softimage
- Blender (software)
- Cinema 4D
- Lightwave 3D
- Houdini
- Computer animation
- Autodesk Arnold
