= Stefen Fangmeier =

American film director

- Born: Stefen Markus Fangmeier; December 9, 1960 (age 65); El Paso, Texas, United States
- Occupations: Film director Visual effects supervisor
- Years active: 1991–present

Stefen Markus Fangmeier (born December 9, 1960, in El Paso, Texas, United States) is an American visual effects supervisor and film director. He worked on numerous major feature films, including Lemony Snicket's A Series of Unfortunate Events, Saving Private Ryan, Terminator 2: Judgment Day, Twister, The Perfect Storm and Master and Commander: The Far Side of the World. He also has been a second unit director for two films, Dreamcatcher (2003) and Galaxy Quest (1999). After more than 15 years of visual effects work, Fangmeier moved into feature film directing with his debut on Eragon, which was released in 2006 to negative critic reviews but was a box office success.

Since Eragon, Fangmeier has largely focused on supervising and directing visual effects, including for the eighth season of Game of Thrones and Sin City: A Dame to Kill For. Fangmeier speaks German as well as English, and lives in Los Angeles.
