= Robert Abel and Associates =

American computer animation production company

Robert Abel & Associates
- Industry: Computer animation
- Founded: 1971; 55 years ago
- Founder: Robert Abel
- Defunct: 1987; 39 years ago

Robert Abel and Associates (RA&A) was an American pioneering animation production company specializing in television commercials made with computer graphics. Founded by Robert Abel and Con Pederson in 1971, RA&A was especially known for their art direction and won many Clio Awards.

Abel and his team created some of the most advanced and impressive computer-animated works of their time, including full ray-traced renders and fluid character animation at a time when such things were largely unknown. A variety of high-profile television advertisements, graphics sequences for motion pictures (including The Andromeda Strain and Tron), and work on laserdisc video games such as Cube Quest, put Abel and his team on the map in the early 1980s. The company was also originally commissioned to create the visual effects for Star Trek: The Motion Picture, but were subsequently taken off the project for mishandling funds. The company was also notable on its work for The Jacksons' 1981 music video "Can You Feel It."

RA&A was on the southwest corner of Highland Avenue and Romaine in the heart of Hollywood, California. RA&A closed in 1987 following an ill-fated merger with now-defunct Omnibus Computer Graphics, Inc., a company which had been based in Toronto.

Many people who worked at RA&A went on to other ground-breaking projects, including the founding of Wavefront Technologies, Rhythm & Hues and other studios. Many RA&A people went on to win Academy Awards.

== Bibliography ==
- Carlson, Wayne. "Chapter 6.5, Commercial Companies: Robert Abel and Associates" in Computer Graphics and Computer Animation: A Retrospective Overview (ebook), Ohio State University Press, 2017: pp. 186-195.
