= Stuart Little (disambiguation) =

Stuart Little is a 1945 children's novel by E.B. White.

Stuart Little may also refer to:

- Stuart Little (franchise), the animated media franchise based on the book
  - Stuart Little (film), the first film
  - Stuart Little 2, the sequel film
  - Stuart Little 3: Call of the Wild, the second animated sequel film
  - Stuart Little (TV series), the animated television series
  - Stuart Little: The Journey Home, the video game based on the 1999 film
- Stuart Little (golfer), English golfer
