= List of Stuart Little characters =

This is a list of characters of the Stuart Little franchise that appear in the novel, films and other related media.

== The Little family ==
=== Stuart Little ===
Stuart Little
- Stuart Little character
- First appearance: Stuart Little (1945)
- Created by: E. B. White
- Voiced by: Michael J. Fox (1999-2006); David Kaufman (2002-2003)

In-universe information
- Species: Mouse
- Gender: Male

Stuart Little is the titular main character. He is a young white anthropomorphic mouse. He is a member of the Little family living in Manhattan in 1945 in the book, and later in 1999 to 2006 in film and television series. Although Stuart's age is never stated he has the mind and personality of a teenager. Critics have compared Stuart's life as a mouse entering a human world to that of an adolescent toward adulthood; which means that he is probably in his late teens or early 20s. Others see Stuart as giving children an empowering model of a small hero in a big world.

The novel presents Stuart as being born to human parents which some found problematic. The first film has Stuart adopted from an orphanage after the accidental death of his birth parents.

=== George Little ===
George Little (portrayed by Jonathan Lipnicki in the first two films, and voiced by Myles Jeffrey in the animated series and by Corey Padnos in Stuart Little 3: Call of the Wild) is the eldest son of the Little family and Stuart's adoptive older brother. George enjoys making friends with Mr. and Mrs. Little. His interests include toy models, racing model boats, and video games.

In the first film, George was excited at first about having a little brother until he found that his parents had adopted a mouse. He ignored Stuart until they played together with some of George's models, after which George became appreciative and defensive of Stuart. He fights a bully named Anton for insulting Stuart and initiates a search party when the police are unable to bring Stuart home.

George plays a slightly larger role in the second film, as Stuart convinces him to concoct a series of elaborate lies to cover for him, while he and Snowbell search for Margalo. Eleanor and Frederick eventually realize that George has lied to them. After being reprimanded for his deception and interrogated on Stuart's true whereabouts, George finally confesses where Stuart was last seen, prompting them to head out and look for him. His parents ultimately forgive both George for lying to them and Stuart for running away.

In Stuart Little 3: Call of the Wild, George is seen playing a handheld video game and develops a crush on Brooke, a Lake Scout at Lake Garland. George joins the Scouts to be close to Brooke.

=== Mr. Little ===
Mr. Frederick C. Little (portrayed and voiced by Hugh Laurie) is the patriarch of the Little family, and Mrs. Little's husband.

In the 1945 novel, his middle initial was revealed to be "C". It is unknown what C. stands for, and his middle initial was never used in any of the Stuart Little films or in the animated series.

He works at the New York Museum of Natural History and plays piano.

Mr. Little is supportive of his family, encouraging Stuart to see the bright side of bad situations and telling him the importance of perseverance. He tries to get his wife to let Stuart do physical activities despite her fears for his safety. In Stuart Little 3: Call of the Wild, when Mrs. Little refuses to let Stuart enroll in the Scouts due to his small stature, Mr. Little chips in saying it might do him some good, he was a Scout himself, and that he will watch out for him. Mr. Little volunteers himself to be in the Scouts as an assistant to Troopmaster Bickle. He also helps his wife remodel their cabin.

=== Mrs. Little ===
Mrs. Eleanor Little (portrayed and voiced by Geena Davis in the films, and by Jennifer Hale in the animated series) is the matriarch of the Little family, and Mr. Little's wife.

In the 1945 novel, she was referred to as Mrs. Frederick C. Little. Her name was revealed in the 1999 film, as it was never mentioned in the 1945 novel.

She is a loving, kindhearted mother and can sometimes be overprotective of Stuart. Mrs. Little gave birth to Martha sometime after the events of the first film, and the DVD commentary for Stuart Little 2 reveals that she is a music teacher at Stuart and George's school. She demonstrates DIY skills in Stuart Little 3: Call of the Wild when she makes improvements to the family's lakeside cabin.

=== Snowbell ===
Snowbell
- Stuart Little character
- First appearance: Stuart Little (1945)
- Created by: E. B. White
- Voiced by: Nathan Lane (1999-2002); Quinton Flynn (2003); Kevin Schon (2003-2006)

In-universe information
- Species: Persian cat
- Gender: Male

Snowbell is the family's Persian cat, Stuart's best friend and a former member of Smokey's alley cat gang. Snowbell is selfish, cowardly, and shallow, but lovable. He has been in the family longer than Stuart. George, Mr., and Mrs. Little are all oblivious to the fact that he can talk while Stuart is aware that he can talk.

In the first film, Snowbell is jealous of Stuart and plots to get rid of him. He considers eating him, but cannot as Stuart is a member of the family. Mrs. Little tells Snowbell that if he is ever caught eating Stuart, he is going outside permanently and can never again come back into the house. He tries to keep Stuart's existence secret from the alley cats because they will try to eat him and because their "mouse with a pet cat" relationship is an embarrassment. When the alley cats discover and hunt Stuart, Snowbell has a change of heart and defends him. Stuart returns the favor and they become friends.

In Stuart Little 2, Snowbell reluctantly helps Stuart look for Margalo, whom he has taken a dislike to, when she mysteriously disappears. Later, with the help of Monty, Snowbell finds Margalo from the Falcon, upset and very emotional at her departure.

Snowbell has further adventures camping with his family in Stuart Little 3: Call of the Wild, until he is eventually kidnapped by a mysterious beast, who only refuses to eat him when Snowbell suggested that she can fatten him up first in order to make a rug out of Snowbell's fur for the winter. However, Snowbell is eventually rescued, found by a search party, and happily reunites with Stuart to go home.

In the live action films, Lucky Prince serves as the primary physical actor for Snowbell. While in the sequel, other cats such Lucky, Tuffy and Rocky were used for additional and close-up shots.

=== Martha Little ===
Martha Little (portrayed by Anna and Ashley Hoelck in the second film and voiced by Jennifer Hale in the animated series) is the infant daughter of the Little family who is Stuart and George's younger sister. Her character was created specifically for the film series. She is very messy and curious about the world.

In Stuart Little 2, Martha says her first words. In the animated series, Martha speaks more, but still sometimes gibbers. In Stuart Little 3: Call of the Wild, her only speaking is babbles and a single line.

== Introduced in the 1945 book ==
=== Doctor Carey ===
Doctor Paul Carey is a New York dentist. He is a kind individual who loves his patients, and a friend of Stuart's. His hobby is boat racing, and is the owner of the schooner Wasp, that Stuart thought "seemed to him finer and prouder than any other". He gave Stuart a tiny car when Stuart told him that he was travelling on foot to find Margalo.

=== Harriet Ames ===
Harriet Ames is a girl of about Stuart's height and age. She is said to be one of the best-dressed girls in New York City, with clothes that are especially tailored just for her. Harriet is also said to come from a rich family. Stuart invites Harriet to go on a date with him in a miniature canoe, but discovers that it has been played with by the local children when they arrive.

=== LeRoy ===
LeRoy is a fat, lazy 12-year-old boy who is the owner of the Lillian B. Womwrath, a model sailboat which always managed to beat the other competitors in the Central Park boat race. He convinced Stuart to man his boat for him in exchange for a peanut butter and jelly sandwich and his own radio, but Stuart turned down the offer. Stuart managed to beat his boat in the race by losing it in a thunderstorm.

=== Margalo ===
Margalo (voiced by Melanie Griffith in the second film and Rachael Harris in the animated series) is a young anthropomorphic domestic canary, one of Stuart's closest friends and his love interest. She is kind and free-spirited and always there for the people she loves. In the 1945 novel, Mrs. Little adopted Margalo. Stuart becomes more infatuated with her the longer she stays. She saves Stuart's life when he stumbles onto a garbage barge, and is warned of Snowbell's plot to eat her and flies away from the Littles'.

In Stuart Little 2, Margalo was taken in by the Falcon, who raised her to steal Mrs. Little's two karat ring. Margalo befriends Stuart, leaves Falcon and gives Mrs. Little's ring back.

In the animated series, Margalo is a recurring character who sometimes visits the Littles.

=== Miss Gunderson ===
Miss Gunderson was a character in the original Stuart Little novel who was mentioned, but never seen. She was the teacher at the local schoolhouse who was unable to teach her students due to being ill.

A similar teacher character makes a brief appearance in Stuart Little 2, portrayed by actress Maria Bamford. However, this character is unnamed, and has Stuart and George in her class, unlike the book counterpart.

=== Angora Cat ===
The Angora Cat is an unnamed female Turkish angora cat who lives in a tool shed in a small park near the Littles' house after escaping from a cage in a pet shop. Snowbell formulated a plan with the Angora Cat that would allow Snowbell to eat Margalo.

=== Edward Clydesdale ===
Edward Clydesdale is one of Dr. Paul Carey's patients who suggested where Stuart should look for Margalo. Most of his dialogue is barely understandable due to his teeth still being worked on as he was talking to Stuart.

=== Doctor Beechwood ===
Doctor Beechwood (portrayed by Dabney Coleman) is a medical doctor who came to the Littles' house to take Stuart's temperature after Mrs. Little accidentally left him in the washing machine.

Beechwood had a small role in the 1999 film just like he did in the novel.

== Introduced in the 1999 film ==
=== Monty ===
Monty (voiced by Steve Zahn in the first two films, André Sogliuzzo in the animated series and Rino Romano in Stuart Little 3: Call of the Wild) is a gray tabby cat, Snowbell's best friend and a former member of Smokey's alley cat gang. He is an original character introduced for the film series. Monty is shown to be dimwitted, unintelligent and somewhat of a blabbermouth, earning him the nickname, "Monty the Mouth". Being an alley cat, he has vast knowledge of the various streets and alleyways of Manhattan. His personal goal throughout the series is to satisfy his appetite, which involves him attempting to eat Stuart or digging for scraps in the city. His catchphrase is "Pleeeeease?", which is commonly used when he is begging for food or something he personally desires.

In Stuart Little 2, Monty was physically portrayed by Merlin and Magoo. According to the DVD commentary for the first film, Rob Minkoff was able to achieve most of the animals' movements with the help of editor Tom Finan. The shot of Monty laughing was achieved by the cat trainer giving the cat something to eat, as Minkoff had noted the cat would bob its head just the right way when eating.

=== Crenshaw Little ===
Crenshaw Little (portrayed and voiced by Jeffrey Jones) is Mr. Little's elder brother, the younger brother of Beatrice, and one of George and Stuart's two uncles.

Crenshaw first appeared in the first film as he attended the Little family reunion for Stuart's arrival into the family. He was also mentioned in Stuart Little 2 during a conversation between Mr. and Mrs. Little in which Mr. Little mentions that Crenshaw's kids never stop growing. He later returned as a supporting character and Stuart, George and Martha's uncle in the animated series where it is revealed he has bought a farm, which Stuart and his family visit in the episode "A Little Bit Country", as well as a hotel that was thought to be haunted in the episode "A Little Vacation".

=== Smokey ===
Smokey (voiced by Chazz Palminteri) is a Chartreux with a Mafia-like personality who is the leader of the alley cats and the main antagonist of the first film. He came up with the plan to kill Stuart after Snowbell and Monty summoned him. Smokey was defeated by Stuart at the end of the film when he knocked him out of a tree, causing him to be chased away by a horde of dogs.

=== Lucky ===
Lucky (voiced by Jim Doughan) is a Siamese cat who is also one of Smokey's henchcats.

=== Red ===
Red (voiced by David Alan Grier) is a ginger American Shorthair tomcat and one of Smokey's henchcats. He is believed to be the idiot of his gang considering he tends to forget Stuart's name, since he does not know Stuart very well.

=== Reginald Stout ===
Mr. Reginald "Reggie" Stout (voiced by Bruno Kirby) is Camille's husband and Stuart's fake father. He and his wife live on a golf course. They were both forced by Smokey and his henchcats to pose as Stuart's supposedly long-lost parents as part of his plan.

In Stuart Little 3: Big Photo Adventure, it is shown that Reginald is an expert golfer and that has many trophies.

=== Camille Stout ===
Mrs. Camille Stout (voiced by Jennifer Tilly) is Reginald's wife and Stuart's fake mother. Although she and her husband were forced to pose as Stuart's long-lost parents, she tends to care for Stuart as if he was her own son and eventually reveals to him, along with Reginald, about Smokey's plans and urge him to flee.

Camille reappeared in Stuart Little: The Journey Home for the Game Boy Color along with her husband Reginald in a driving stage.

=== Anton Gartman ===
Anton Gartman (portrayed by Miles Marsico) is a mean-spirited boy who bullied George. Anton tried to cheat his way to victory in the boat race by knocking out the other contestants. He appears to be very passionate about boat racing despite his young age and is depicted as being rude, inconsiderate and overly competitive.

=== Detective Sherman ===
Detective Sherman (portrayed by Jon Polito) is a police detective who works for the New York Police Department, organizing the investigation into Stuart's kidnapping.

=== Detective Allen ===
Detective Phil Allen (portrayed by Jim Doughan) is Detective Sherman's partner.

=== Mrs. Keeper ===
Mrs. Keeper (portrayed by Julia Sweeney) is the head of the New York City Public Orphanage where Stuart was raised. She is a kind woman who happily watches over the orphans there.

=== Tina Little ===
Tina Little (portrayed by Connie Ray) is Crenshaw's wife, and Beatrice and Mr. Little's sister-in-law and one of George and Stuart's two aunts.

=== Beatrice Little ===
Beatrice Little (portrayed by Allyce Beasley) is Crenshaw and Mr. Little's elder sister and one of George and Stuart's two aunts.

=== Edgar Little ===
Edgar Little (portrayed by Brian Doyle-Murray) is Beatrice, Crenshaw and Mr. Little's cousin and Grandpa Spencer's nephew.

=== Estelle Little ===
Estelle Little (portrayed by Estelle Getty) is Beatrice, Crenshaw and Mr. Little's mother and George and Stuart's grandmother.

=== Spencer Little ===
Spencer Little (portrayed by Harold Gould) is Beatrice, Crenshaw and Mr. Little's father and George and Stuart's grandfather.

=== Stretch Little ===
Stretch Little (portrayed by Patrick Thomas O'Brien) is the husband of Beatrice, the brother-in-law of Crenshaw and Mr. Little and one of George and Stuart's two uncles.

== Introduced in Stuart Little 2 ==
=== Falcon ===
Falcon (voiced by James Woods in the second film and Pat Fraley in the animated series) is a peregrine falcon who served as Margalo's master and the film's main antagonist. He has a threatening, abusive personality towards Margalo. He took Margalo in when she was young and raised her to be his personal slave, forcing her to steal various objects, including Mrs. Little's wedding ring.

During the production of Stuart Little 2, when the main antagonist was decided to be a bird, the animators researched a number of different predatorial birds including eagles and hawks. The peregrine falcon was ultimately decided on due to its villainous postures. Early designs of the Falcon originally had him walking on both feet in an anthropomorphic fashion while wearing a necklace beaded with valuables he has initially stolen.

Falcon returned in the animated series in the episode "A Little Bit Country", determined to take revenge on Stuart.

=== Will Powell ===
William "Will" Powell (portrayed and voiced by Marc John Jefferies) is George's loyal best friend.

=== The Coach ===
The Coach (portrayed by Jim Doughan) is George and Stuart's soccer coach.

=== Wallace ===
Wallace (portrayed by Angelo Massagli) is one of Stuart and George's fellow soccer players and teammates. He is George's second bully who picked on him on the soccer field. He was kicked in the face with a soccer ball by George during the final moments of the game as a result of his tormenting.

=== Irwin ===
Irwin (portrayed by Kevin Olson) is another of Stuart and George's fellow soccer players and teammates. During George's soccer game, he was injured in the stomach after being hit by a soccer ball. His injury prompted the coach to let Stuart join the game and fill in for him, as Stuart sat on the bench for most of the game.

=== Tony ===
Tony (portrayed by Bobby Walsh) is one of George and Stuart's classmates. He takes karate lessons.

=== Mark ===
Mark (portrayed by Michael C. Fuchs) is another of George and Stuart's classmates. He takes guitar lessons.

=== Rob ===
Rob (portrayed by Brad Garrett) was the plumber that came to the Littles' house to find Mrs. Little's ring after she thought it had fallen down the drain.

=== Rita Powell ===
Rita Powell (portrayed by Amelia Marshall) is Will's mother. She has a minor role in Stuart Little 2, in which she speaks to Mrs. Little when she approaches her doorstep to pick up Stuart and George, only to find out Stuart isn't there.

=== Taxi Driver ===
An unnamed Indian-American taxi driver (portrayed by Ronobir Lahiri) drives the Little family around the city in search of Stuart. A catchphrase that he tends to say is "Okey-dokey, no problem!"

== Introduced in the animated series ==
=== Rick Ruckus ===
Richard "Rick" Ruckus (voiced by Matt Kaminsky) is a pro skater whom George and Stuart are big fans of.

=== Butch ===
Butch is a dog who lives in the same neighborhood as the Littles. In the episode "The Meatloaf Bandit", George and Stuart attempted to train him as their watchdog against the Meatloaf Bandit. His owner, Mr. Brown, was never seen. He is the only animal character in the franchise that doesn't talk.

=== Larry Gronk ===
Larry Gronk (voiced by Daniel Hansen) is a student who attends George, Stuart and Will's school. In the episode "Life, Liberty and the Pursuit of Taco Tuesday", he ran for the position of Class Officer, but his campaign was unintentionally sabotaged by Stuart, George, and Will. After a couple of failed attempts to push their efforts back, Larry eventually admits that he only ran to get out of gym class early and favors a vote for Stuart.

=== Ginger ===
Ginger (voiced by Julie Nathanson) is a female cat whom Snowbell develops a crush on in the episode "A Little Too Fast". His attempts at meeting her are foiled by George, but near the end of the episode, they meet up and plan a date.

=== The Crows ===
The Crows (both voiced by Jeff Bennett) are a full nest of crows who served as Falcon's henchmen in the episode "A Little Bit Country".

=== Scar and Tiger ===
Scar (voiced by Michael Chiklis) and Tiger (voiced by Mark Hamill) are two cats who are the main antagonists in the episode "No Job is Too Little". They are both old friends of Monty. Upon seeing Stuart and George delivering bags of food from a deli, they hatch a plan to ambush them and take the food for themselves. They both come close to stealing them, along with eating Stuart, but are thwarted by Snowbell.

== Introduced in Stuart Little 3: Call of the Wild ==
=== Reeko ===
Reeko (voiced by Wayne Brady) is a smooth-talking anthropomorphic skunk and the Beast's former servant who befriends Stuart. Reeko is described by the forest animals as being selfish, lazy, greedy, and rude. He is mostly seen throughout the film trying to find a way to give food to a ferocious cougar called the "Beast". When he met Stuart, he was only interested in what kinds of food he could give him that he could offer to the Beast, but thinks differently when Stuart deems him as a friend and watches him sacrifice himself to save Snowbell from the Beast. At the end of the film, Reeko and Stuart give each other a hug as a sign of their friendship, and Stuart's family drives home.

=== The Beast ===
The Beast (voiced by Virginia Madsen) is a ferocious and ruthless female cougar, Reeko's master, and the tyrannical ruler of the forest of Lake Garland and the main antagonist. She resides in a cave on the other side of the forest, and every night, terrorizes the animals of the forest into bringing her food as part of a tribute to herself. She forced Reeko in particular to also bring her food, most likely due to him being late in doing so and plotted to make a rug out of Snowbell's fur when she kidnaps him. The Beast is defeated when she falls into a rope for Stuart and Snowbell's trap, and got taken away in a helicopter.

=== Brooke ===
Brooke (voiced by Tara Strong) is an experienced Lake Scout at Lake Garland who is George's love interest.

=== Troopmaster Bickle ===
Troopmaster Bickle (voiced by Peter MacNicol) is the slightly overweight, clumsy, comical, yet well-intentioned leader of the Lake Scouts. Bickle appears to be inexperienced when it comes to leading the Scouts as he sometimes uses incorrect words, and occasionally gets himself hurt. Despite this, he is a kind man who always tries to do a good job leading them.

=== Beaver ===
Beaver (voiced by Charlie Adler) is one of the animals of the forest who dislikes Reeko. His opinion of him changes when Reeko risks his life to save Stuart.

=== Cottontail ===
Cottontail (voiced by Kath Soucie) is a rabbit who is one of the animals of the forest who dislikes Reeko.

=== Elwin ===
Elwin is an overweight child who is one of the Lake Scouts at Lake Garland. He does not have a speaking role in the film. He is shown to be very physically fit despite his weight.
