= Snowbell =

Snowbell is a common name for several plants and characters and may refer to:

- Soldanella, a genus of herbaceous plants in the family Primulaceae, native to Europe
- Styrax, a genus of shrubs and small trees in the family Styracaceae, native to Asia and North and South America
- Leucojum vernum, a species of flowering bulbous plant in the family Amaryllidaceae, native to Europe
- Snowbell, a cat from the 1945 E. B White novel Stuart Little and it's associated film series
- USS Snowbell, Ailanthus-class net laying ship
