= Margalo =

Margalo is a female given name. Notable bearers with the name include:

- Margalo Gillmore (1897–1986), American actress
- Margalo, a fictional canary in the novel Stuart Little and in the movie Stuart Little 2
