= Stuart Little (franchise) =

American film franchise

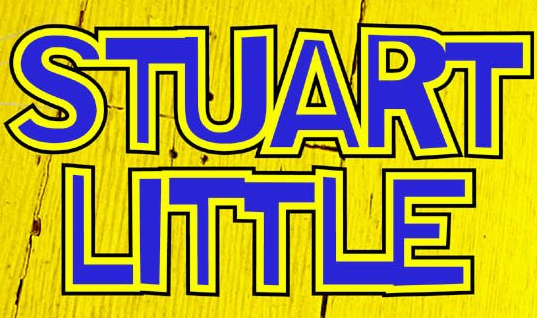
- Logo used in the first film
- Original work: Stuart Little (1999)
- Owner: Sony Pictures Entertainment
- Years: 1999–present
- Based on: Stuart Little by E. B. White

Films and television
- Films: Stuart Little (1999); Stuart Little 2 (2002)
- Television series: Stuart Little (2003)
- Direct-to-video: Stuart Little 3: Call of the Wild (2006)

Games
- Video game(s): Stuart Little: Big City Adventures (1999); Stuart Little: The Journey Home (2001); Stuart Little 2 (2002); Stuart Little 2: Air Adventure (2003); Stuart Little 3: Big Photo Adventure (2006)

Stuart Little is a mixed live-action and animated American film franchise based on the 1945 children's book Stuart Little by E. B. White. The films are produced by Franklin / Waterman Productions and released by Columbia Pictures.

The franchise follows the adventures of Stuart Little, a young white mouse adopted by a human couple. He embarks on life-changing adventures.

== Films ==
=== Stuart Little (1999) ===
Stuart (voiced by Michael J. Fox) is an anthropomorphic teenage white mouse who is adopted into a human family. His new parents, Eleanor and Frederick (Geena Davis, Hugh Laurie) are thrilled with him, but everyone else is not. Through a series of adventures he eventually gains the love of his big brother George, (Jonathan Lipnicki), acceptance by the extended Little family, and even the grudging tolerance of the family cat Snowbell (voiced by Nathan Lane), who is a member of an alley cat Mafia-like gang that wants to eliminate Stuart.

=== Stuart Little 2 (2002) ===
In the sequel, Stuart (voiced by Michael J. Fox) and his brother George (Jonathan Lipnicki) are attending school together, but his mother (Geena Davis) doesn't seem to think Stuart is capable of taking care of himself. Later, Stuart meets a yellow canary named Margalo (voiced by Melanie Griffith) who he unintentionally saves from an evil Falcon (voiced by James Woods) and eventually becomes smitten with her. But one day, when Margalo is nowhere to be found, Stuart and Snowbell (voiced by Nathan Lane) team up to go and find her.

=== Stuart Little 3: Call of the Wild (2005) ===
In the third film, Stuart (voiced by Michael J. Fox) and his family are spending their summer vacation in a cabin near the fictional Lake Garland. Stuart signs up to be a lake-scout in an attempt to prove to his mother (voiced by Geena Davis) that he doesn't need to be watched over all the time. Soon, Stuart meets a new friend: a skunk named Reeko (voiced by Wayne Brady) whom he quickly befriends. But when a ferocious puma named the Beast (voiced by Virginia Madsen) hatches a plot to make a rug out of Snowbell's fur (voiced by Kevin Schon), Stuart must gather up all his courage to save him.

=== Possible reboot ===
It was reported by the Tracking Board and Zimbio that a new Stuart Little film was in development by Sony Pictures and Red Wagon Productions with Douglas Wick and Lucy Fisher returning as the producers. Similar to the first two films, it will feature a combination of live-action and computer animation. The new film was said to be in the vein of a John Hughes film.

It has been stated that the film will be a more faithful adaptation of the E. B. White novel than the previous films, and was originally set to be released in either 2018 or 2019. Currently, the film's status remains unknown.

== Television ==
=== Stuart Little (2003) ===
An animated series taking place between the events of the second and third films premiered on HBO Family on March 1, 2003. It ran for a single season consisting of 13 episodes. While the series was traditionally animated, every episode included a segment in which a CGI-esque Stuart recounted an event that would open and end each episode. Hugh Laurie, Jeffrey Jones, and Marc John Jefferies reprised their roles as Frederick, Uncle Crenshaw and Will respectively, while the rest of the characters were voiced by veteran voice actors.

=== Upcoming television series ===
On October 3, 2023, it was announced an animated series reboot of Stuart Little is currently in the works at Sony Pictures Television Kids. It has been described as being in the vein of Freaks and Geeks.

== Video games ==
Stuart Little: Big City Adventures based on the first film, was released for Microsoft Windows in 1999. It is a point and click action-adventure game featuring five minigames based on elements from the film including the Boat race, Stuart's drive through Central Park, Monty's visit, mini-golfing, and even George's trainset. Upon load-up, all of the minigames are played one after another after an introduction from Snowbell, but players do have the option to play them individually.

Stuart Little: The Journey Home, a 2-D side-scroller, also based on the first film, was released exclusively for the Game Boy Color in 2001. It features eight levels all based on or inspired from scenes from the film.

A video game tie-in to Stuart Little 2 was released for the PlayStation, Game Boy Advance, and Microsoft Windows in 2002.

Stuart Little 2: Air Adventure, also based on the second film, was released exclusively for Java Micro Edition mobile phones in 2003. It is a 2-D air shooter in which Stuart has to navigate the skies to save Margalo from the Falcon. The goal is to collect as many balloons as possible while dodging other birds.

Stuart Little 3: Big Photo Adventure was released exclusively for the PlayStation 2 in 2005. It centers around Stuart who goes on a quest to complete a new photo album for George's school project after he accidentally destroys the last one. The game features an open-world environment and multiple worlds with their own designated photos in which the player can acquire by solving puzzles and completing tasks for various characters. Despite being subtitled with the number three, it is not related to Stuart Little 3: Call of the Wild, which released the same year.

== Reception ==
=== Critical response ===
Film	Rotten Tomatoes	Metacritic
Stuart Little	67% (97 reviews)	61 (32 reviews)
Stuart Little 2	81% (123 reviews)	66 (29 reviews)
Stuart Little 3: Call of the Wild	51% (4 reviews)	N/A

=== Box office performance ===
Film	Release date	Revenue			Budget	Ref.
Film	Release date	U.S. and Canada	Other territories	Worldwide	Budget	Ref.
Stuart Little	December 17, 1999	$140,035,367	$160,100,000	$300,135,367	$133,000,000	-
Stuart Little 2	July 19, 2002	$64,956,806	$105,000,000	$169,956,806	$120,000,000	-
Stuart Little 3: Call of the Wild	February 21, 2006	$11,776,585 (DVD sales)	N/A	$11,776,585 (DVD sales)	N/A	-
Total		$216,768,758	$265,100,000	$481,868,758	$253,000,000	-

== Cast and crew ==
=== Principal cast ===
List indicators
- A dark gray cell indicates the character was not featured in that installment.
- A ^{P} indicates a performance through a photographic still.
- A ^{V} indicates a performance through voice-over work.

Characters	Films			Video game	Animated series
Characters	Stuart Little	Stuart Little 2	Stuart Little 3: Call of the Wild^{V}	Stuart Little: Big City Adventures	Stuart Little^{V}
Stuart Little	Michael J. Fox^{V}	Michael J. Fox^{V}	Michael J. Fox	David Kaufman	David Kaufman
Mrs. Eleanor Little	Geena Davis	Geena Davis	Geena Davis	Geena Davis^{P}	Jennifer Hale
Mr. Frederick Little	Hugh Laurie	Hugh Laurie	Hugh Laurie	Hugh Laurie^{P}	Hugh Laurie
George Little	Jonathan Lipnicki	Jonathan Lipnicki	Corey Padnos	Jonathan Lipnicki^{P}	Myles Jeffrey
Martha Little		Anna and Ashley Hoelck	Uncredited voice		Jennifer Hale
Snowbell	Nathan Lane^{V}	Nathan Lane^{V}	Kevin Schon	Darrin Brege	Quinton Flynn
Snowbell	Nathan Lane^{V}	Nathan Lane^{V}	Kevin Schon	Darrin Brege	Kevin Schon
Monty	Steve Zahn^{V}	Steve Zahn^{V}	Rino Romano	Darrin Brege	André Sogliuzzo
Smokey	Chazz Palminteri^{V}			Silent cameo	
Reginald Stout	Bruno Kirby^{V}				
Camille Stout	Jennifer Tilly^{V}				
Uncle Crenshaw Little	Jeffrey Jones				Jeffrey Jones
Lucky	Jim Doughan^{V}				
Red	David Alan Grier^{V}				
Mrs. Keeper	Julia Sweeney				
Aunt Tina Little	Connie Ray				
Aunt Beatrice Little	Allyce Beasley				
Cousin Edgar Little	Brian Doyle-Murray				
Grandma Estelle Little	Estelle Getty				
Grandpa Spencer Little	Harold Gould				
Uncle Stretch Little	Patrick Thomas O'Brien				
Anton	Miles Marsico				
Margalo		Melanie Griffith^{V}			Kathy Najimy
The Falcon		James Woods^{V}			Pat Fraley
Will		Marc John Jefferies			Marc John Jefferies
Reeko			Wayne Brady		
The Beast			Virginia Madsen		
Troopmaster Bickle			Peter MacNicol		
Brooke			Tara Strong		

=== Additional crew ===
Role	Film		
Role	Stuart Little	Stuart Little 2	Stuart Little 3: Call of the Wild
Role	1999	2002	2006
Director(s)	Rob Minkoff	Rob Minkoff	Audu Paden
Producer(s)	Douglas Wick	Douglas Wick; Lucy Fisher	Douglas Wick; Lucy Fisher; Leslie Hough
Writer(s)	Screenplay by: M. Night Shyamalan; Greg Brooker	Screenplay by: Bruce Joel Rubin; Story by: Douglas Wick; Bruce Joel Rubin	Screenplay by: Bob Shaw; Don McEnery; Story by: Douglas Wick
Composer(s)	Alan Silvestri	Alan Silvestri	Atli Örvarsson
Cinematographer(s)	Guillermo Navarro	Steven Poster	—N/a
Editor(s)	Tom Finan	Priscilla Nedd-Friendly	Robert Gordon; Bruce King
