= Solomon B Taiwo =

English actor (born 1990)

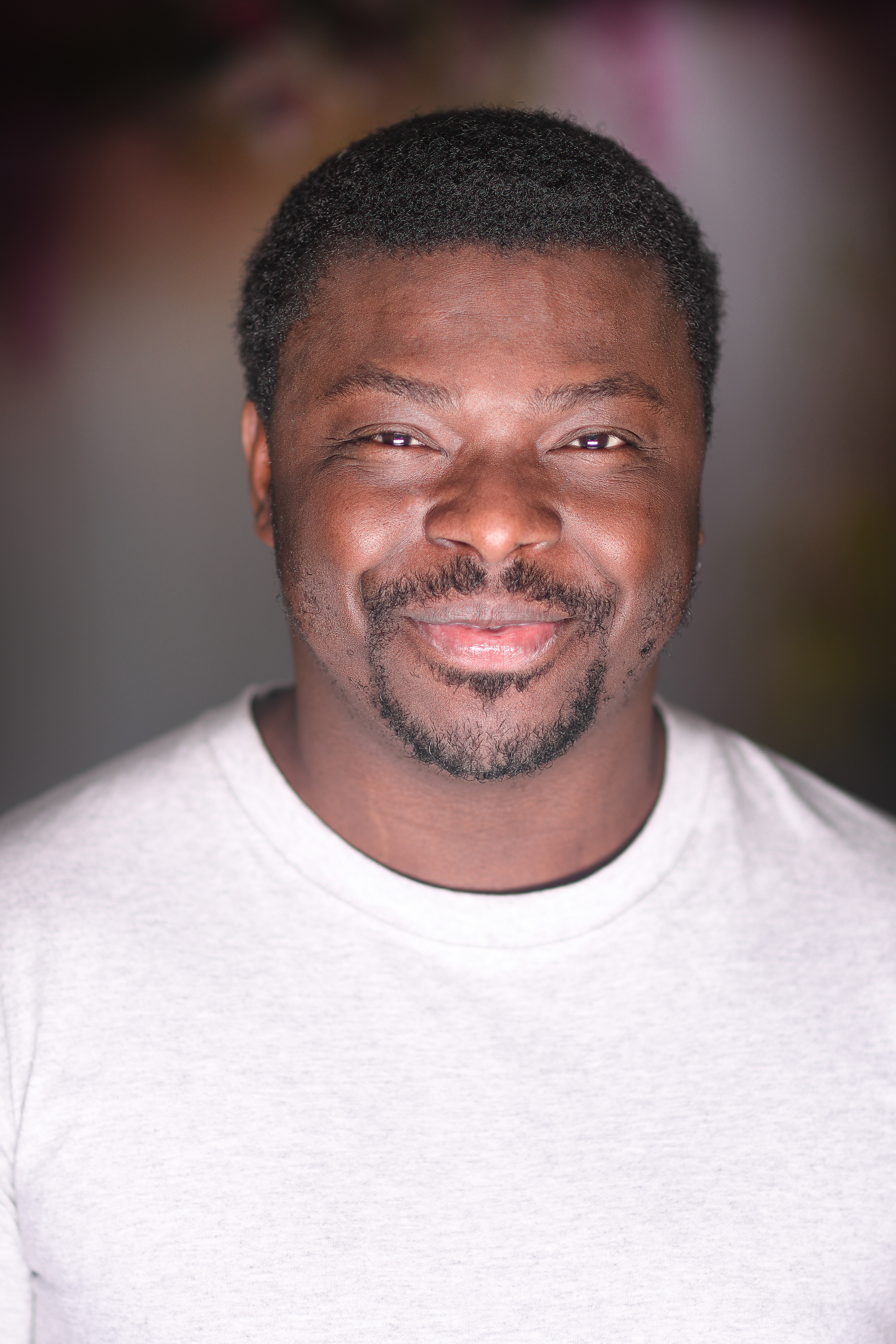
- Treasure in 2025
- Born: 10 November 1990 (age 35)
- Citizenship: United Kingdom
- Occupations: Actor, author
- Years active: 2016–present
- Height: 1.75 m (5 ft 9 in)

Solomon B Taiwo (born 10 November 1990), known professionally as Adam Treasure, is an English actor best known for playing Olaudah Equiano in the Canadian series Enslaved. In 2016, he received The Beffta Rising Star Recognition Award. He joined the cast of the horror film Camp Pleasant Lake in 2022.

== Early life ==
Taiwo was raised in East London and attended Langdon Park School. He had previously worked in sales before beginning his acting career.

== Personal life ==
In 2019, Taiwo opened up on the Max Foster podcast, revealing that at age 19, he had experienced homelessness.

== Film ==
Year	Title	Role
2023	Mercyland	Corv
2024	Camp Pleasant Lake	Jamal Davis

== Television ==
Year	Title	Role	Episode
2019	Moreland’s Firm	Wayne Michaels	Pilot
2020	Enslaved	Olaudah Equiano	Abolition
2023	TMZ Live	Himself	1 episode

== Podcast ==
Year	Title
2019	Cloutology
2021	Let's Dive In

== Awards ==
Year	Award	Category	Nominee(s)	Result	Ref.
2016	BEFFTA Awards	Rising Star Award	Solomon B Taiwo	Won	
