= Boone Narr =

Animal stunt coordinator and trainer

Boone Narr (born January 30, 1948) is an animal stunt coordinator and trainer. He founded Boone's Animals for Hollywood animal training facility located in Castaic, California in 1998. It operated until 2023. Narr is a Vietnam veteran and got into the entertainment industry in 1971.

== Training ==
Boone Narr, a native of Seattle, has been credited as an animal trainer, wrangler and supplier for a number of films and television programmes.

Animals trained at Boone's Animals for Hollywood have also been featured in many other television series, including CSI: Crime Scene Investigation, Ugly Betty and Criminal Minds.

Boone's Animals for Hollywood has also trained and supplied animals for a number of television commercials, including such brands as Budweiser, Disneyland, Walmart, John Deere, McDonald's, Cisco Systems, FedEx, Hewlett-Packard and American Express, among others.

It was reported in the Los Angeles Times that on the set of Narr's first film Any Which Way You Can, Clint Eastwood's sidekick orangutan "Clyde" (originally named "Buddha") was "trained with a can of mace and a pipe wrapped in newspaper." The article actually drew from a book by Dale Peterson and Jane Goodall, who claimed that information from three observers suggested that the orangutan was frequently beaten, and that, some time toward the completion of the film, Buddha was punished for having stolen doughnuts from the set. They state that he was beaten for 20 minutes with a three-and-a-half foot ax handle, and that, after his death some months later, an autopsy suggested evidence of a cerebral hemorrhage. Makeup effects artist William Munns has cast doubt on these claims, saying that Narr was "truly one of the best and kindest trainers I knew."

=== Films ===
Filmography List

Title	Year	Notes
Any Which Way You Can	1980	
The Beastmaster	1982	
Three Amigos	1986	
Who's That Girl	1987	Cougars
The Accidental Tourist	1988	The Cardigan Welsh Corgi dog Edward, which is trained in the film by Geena Davis, was trained in real life by Boone Narr
Indiana Jones and the Last Crusade	1989	Snakes and Lion (Indy's flashback segment). Jules Sylvester supplied and handled the garter snakes for this cinematic production. Hubert Wells of Thousand Oaks, California's Animal Actors of Hollywood and Sled Reynolds of Lebec, California's Gentle Jungle trained Dandy the Lion with Boone Narr for this scene. Wells generously supplied Dandy for this scene. This sequence was supervised by Michael Culling of London's Animal Actors UK.
Flatliners	1990	
Edward Scissorhands	1990	
White Fang	1991	Principal animal trainer
L.A. Story	1991	
Bingo	1991	
Don't Tell Mom the Babysitter's Dead	1991	dog trainer
Grand Canyon	1991	
Falling Down	1993	
Top Dog	1995	Trainer of the dog Reno
The Craft	1996	
The Rock	1996	
A Time to Kill	1996	Boon Narr adopted II (yellow Labrador retriever) from the Castaic Animal Shelter in 1993
Buddy	1997	
Mouse Hunt	1997	
Turbo: A Power Rangers Movie	1997	
Paulie	1998	Twister (terrier mix) was adopted by Boone Narr from the Castaic Animal Shelter in 1995
The Parent Trap	1998	Bob (golden retriever) and Nugget (terrier mix) were adopted by Boone Narr from the Lacy Street Animal Shelter in 1993 and 1994 respectively
Mumford	1999	Boon Narr adopted II (yellow Labrador retriever) from the Castaic Animal Shelter in 1993
The Green Mile	1999	Boone Narr and his team bred and trained the mice
Girl, Interrupted	1999	
Stuart Little	1999	Boone Narr was the animal stunt coordinator
The Kid	2000	
The Crew	2000	
The Cell	2000	David Allsberry was the head trainer
The Mexican	2001	
Cats & Dogs	2001	
America's Sweethearts	2001	doberman trainer
Rat Race	2001	
The Majestic	2001	
The Ring	2002	
Stuart Little 2	2002	
Pirates of the Caribbean: The Curse of the Black Pearl	2003	
Open Range	2003	
Looney Tunes: Back in Action	2003	
Peter Pan	2003	
Willard	2003	
Catwoman	2004	
Christmas with the Kranks	2004	
Must Love Dogs	2005	
Everything Is Illuminated	2005	
Elizabethtown	2005	
Pirates of the Caribbean: Dead Man's Chest	2006	
The Holiday	2006	
The Number 23	2007	
Firehouse Dog	2007	
Pirates of the Caribbean: At World's End	2007	
Underdog	2007	
Forgetting Sarah Marshall	2008	
Tropic Thunder	2008	
Hachiko: A Dog's Story	2009	
Shutter Island	2010	
Cats & Dogs: The Revenge of Kitty Galore	2010	It took six months to cast the animals for the film; the Boone's Animals for Hollywood ended up with 80 different animals and 18 to 26 trainers at any time
You Again	2010	
Due Date	2010	
The Conjuring	2013	
The Dognapper	2013	
Daddy's Home	2015	

=== Television ===
- Mad About You (1992–99)
- Walker, Texas Ranger (1993–2001)
- When Animals Attack! 3/4 (1997)
- Grey's Anatomy (2005–2008)
- Dollhouse (2009)
- Sons of Anarchy (2008–2009)
- Californication (2007–2009)
- Private Practice (2008–2010)
- House M.D. (2007–2010)
- Sons of Tucson (2010)
- True Blood (2008–2010)
- Friends with Benefits (2011)
- Enlightened (2011)

Maui, who played Murray the dog in Mad About You, was discovered by Boone Narr at the Castaic Animal Shelter along with its mother Bingo, who starred in the 1991 film Bingo. Maui was twice voted the most popular dog by the readers of TV Guide.
