= Stuart Little: Big City Adventures =

1999 video game

- Developer: Media Station
- Publisher: Hasbro Interactive
- Series: Stuart Little
- Platform: Windows
- Release: December 13, 1999

Stuart Little: Big City Adventures is a 1999 video game developed by Media Station and published by Hasbro Interactive. It is for ages 4 and up. Stuart Little: Big City Adventures is based on the film Stuart Little and the original Stuart Little book by E.B. White.

== Gameplay ==
Stuart Little: Big City Adventures CD-ROM Game presents a collection of small activities tied together by a storybook mode in which each game is played in sequence. The individual games vary in structure: some, such as the Regatta Race, Park Challenge, and pantry chase, increase in difficulty as the player progresses, though their basic mechanics remain the same. Others, like the mini‑golf and electric train games, offer multiple levels with distinct layouts that create new challenges each time. The mini‑golf holes begin with the same opening section—featuring obstacles such as a pyramid, windmill, or castle—before branching into more complex paths. The electric train game similarly changes its track arrangements across levels. Movement and control differ between games. Most activities use the mouse for interaction, but the pantry chase requires direct movement of Stuart in a side‑scrolling format, navigating objects such as sponges in a sink. Each game tracks high scores, and players can print certificates and pictures as rewards. Snowbell provides in‑game guidance, explaining how each activity works and serving as a help function. The storybook mode links the games together with brief narrative segments, culminating in a closing line about the importance of family.

== Development ==
Stuart Little: Big City Adventures was developed by Media Station, a company founded in 1989 and based in Ann Arbor, Michigan.

== Reception ==
Reception

Review scores
Publication	Score
All Game Guide	3/5 (1999); 2.5/5 (2001)
FamilyPC	82%
The Guardian	3/5

FamilyPC magazine gave Stuart Little: Big City Adventures a score of 82%. Kids Domain praised the game's attention to little details.
