= Rob Minkoff =

American film director and animator (born 1962)

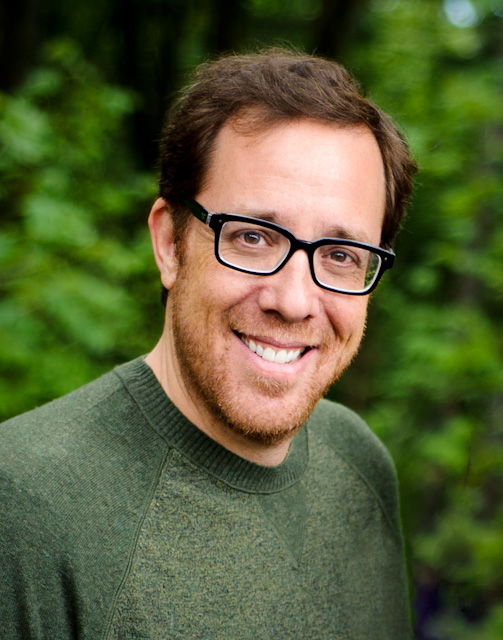
- Minkoff in 2011
- Born: Robert Ralph Minkoff; August 11, 1962 (age 64); Palo Alto, California, U.S.
- Education: California Institute of the Arts
- Occupations: Director; producer; animator
- Years active: 1985–present
- Notable work: The Lion King; Stuart Little; The Haunted Mansion; The Forbidden Kingdom; Flypaper; Mr. Peabody & Sherman; Paws of Fury: The Legend of Hank
- Spouse: Crystal Kung (m. 2007)
- Children: 2

Robert Ralph Minkoff (born August 11, 1962) is an American director, animator, and producer. He is best known for co-directing The Lion King (along with Roger Allers), and live-action films including Stuart Little (1999), Stuart Little 2 (2002), The Haunted Mansion (2003), and The Forbidden Kingdom (2008). In recent decades, he returned to feature animation with Mr. Peabody & Sherman (2014) and Paws of Fury: The Legend of Hank (2022). His wife, Crystal Kung Minkoff, was a cast member on The Real Housewives of Beverly Hills.

== Early life ==
Minkoff was born to a Jewish family in Palo Alto, California to Jack Robert Minkoff (1922–1998) and Tola Fay Minkoff (née Stebel). When he was 15, during a babysitting job, he discovered the book The Art of Walt Disney by Christopher Finch on a coffee table. Minkoff recalled, "I cracked it open and it was filled with so much incredible artwork from the golden age of animation." Enamored with the art of animation, he asked his parents for a copy, which he received for his next birthday.

He studied at Palo Alto High School and graduated from the California Institute of the Arts in the early 1980s in the Character Animation department. During his studies, Minkoff met Chuck Jones and credited him as an inspiration. He remembered, "I met Chuck during my first year at CalArts and he became a mentor to me ... I had always been a big fan of his and having the opportunity to learn from him has really meant a great deal to me professionally as well as personally."

== Career ==
During the summer of 1982, Minkoff received an internship at Walt Disney Productions, and was apprenticed by Eric Larson, a senior animator who was one of the "Nine Old Men". The following year, he was employed as an in-between artist for The Black Cauldron (1985). He was then a supervising animator for The Great Mouse Detective (1986) for the character Olivia, before working as a character designer for The Brave Little Toaster (1987). He also wrote the song "Good Company" for Oliver & Company (1988), and subsequently served as a character animator for The Little Mermaid (1989). On the film, he provided character designs and early animation tests for the villain Ursula.

In 1988, Who Framed Roger Rabbit had become a critical and commercial success, which revived a new interest in theatrical cartoon shorts. To produce further Roger Rabbit media, Disney opened the Feature Animation Florida studio in Orlando, located within the Disney-MGM Studios theme park. Minkoff then became a director for Tummy Trouble (1989) accompanied with Honey, I Shrunk the Kids (1989). He directed the next cartoon short Roller Coaster Rabbit (1990), which was attached with Dick Tracy (1990). Simultaneously, Minkoff was approached to direct The Rescuers Down Under (1990) but turned down the offer because he wanted to be the sole director. He was also offered to direct Beauty and the Beast (1991), but was turned down because he wanted creative control. He later directed a Mickey Mouse short, which was shown at the Disney-MGM Studios, titled Mickey's Audition (1992).

Eager to direct a live-action film, Minkoff was handed the script for a feature-length Roger Rabbit sequel, and was hired to develop the project. However, after a year in development, the project was cancelled. On April 1, 1992, he became the co-director for The Lion King (1994) alongside Roger Allers. On the film, the directorial process began with several sequences divided between Allers and Minkoff. Each director brought their own vision to the sequences, but there was a constant exchange of viewpoints to better ensure a stylistic uniformity. In a 2011 interview, Minkoff stated he had directed the "Circle of Life" sequence while Allers directed the "I Just Can't Wait to Be King" sequence.

In January 1995, it was reported Minkoff was to direct an untitled "fantasy feature" film that was meant to be his first live-action project. The project went unproduced, in which Minkoff explained: "I had told Jeffrey [Katzenberg] before he left Disney that I wanted to do a live-action picture, and he was trying to get me to commit to doing an animated picture before that ... We were in the middle of figuring out what was the right step to take when he resigned [in 1994]." Sometime later, he worked briefly with Robert Zemeckis on a film project with Universal Pictures and a version of Mr. Popper's Penguins with producers Craig Zadan and Neil Meron. In 1997, Minkoff re-teamed with Zadan and Meron on a film adaptation of Into the Woods for Columbia Pictures. When development had stalled, Minkoff learned from the studio's production head about Stuart Little. After subsequently reading M. Night Shyamalan's script for the film, he agreed to direct.

In 1998, Sony Pictures had announced that Minkoff would direct Stuart Little (1999). Principal photography had spanned 12 weeks before it wrapped in mid-November 1998. Released in December 1999, Stuart Little was a commercial success, grossing $300 million worldwide. In November 2000, Minkoff, along with his producing partner Jason Clark, signed a three-year first-look deal with Columbia Pictures, in which he also agreed to direct the sequel, Stuart Little 2 (2002). Soon after, Minkoff was attached to direct a live-action Jetsons film and a remake of The Sorcerer's Apprentice, which both went unproduced. In 2002, Minkoff was hired to direct The Haunted Mansion (2003), which starred Eddie Murphy. The film reunited him with producer Don Hahn, who both had worked on The Lion King (1994).

Sometime in the 2000s, Minkoff founded his own production company, Sprocketdyne Entertainment. In June 2003, it was reported that Minkoff's Sprocketdyne Entertainment was developing a live-action/CGI feature film titled Mr. Peabody & Sherman (based on Mister Peabody from the animated series The Adventures of Rocky and Bullwinkle and Friends) with Sony Pictures. At one point, he took the project to Walden Media, but the studio was occupied with The Chronicles of Narnia film series. Minkoff then toyed with self-financing the film himself, before bringing the film to DreamWorks Animation in 2005. In 2011, DreamWorks Animation announced it would produce the project as a computer-animated film, which reunited Minkoff with Jeffrey Katzenberg. Mr. Peabody & Sherman was released in March 2014.

In 2010, Minkoff had been attached to direct the fantasy action adventure Chinese Odyssey. Minkoff served as a director on the 2018 animated Netflix original animated series of the late Anna Dewdney picture book franchise Llama Llama, overseeing all aspects of production. In November 2015, Minkoff and his producing partner Pietro Ventani had signed a two-picture deal with Le Vision Pictures to co-develop and produce a CGI-animated adaptation of Wolf Totem based on the Jiang Rong novel and a live-action comedy titled Silkworms.

In 2010, Minkoff was pitched the idea for Blazing Samurai by writer Ed Stone, who had initially envisioned an all-human cast. However, Minkoff suggested an all-animal cast, and in 2014, he was attached as a producer. After years in development, Minkoff took the director's chair after Chris Bailey had stepped down. The film was retitled Paws of Fury: The Legend of Hank, and released in theaters on July 15, 2022.

In September 2026, it was reported that Minkoff was in advanced discussions to direct Storm Dogs, a family comedy-drama film developed by the UK-based AI studio Particle 6. By November 2026, it was reported that Minkoff had been hired to direct.

== Personal life ==
Minkoff met his wife Crystal Kung Minkoff, a former cast member on The Real Housewives of Beverly Hills, at a party in his office in 2003, and they attended the Finding Nemo premiere as their first date. Minkoff proposed to her on Valentine's Day 2006, and they married on September 29, 2007. They have a son named Max and a daughter named Zoe.

He participates as a member of the jury for the NYICFF, a local New York City film festival dedicated to screening films for children between the ages of 3 and 18.

== Filmography ==
=== Short film ===
Year	Title	Director	Writer	Producer	Notes
1989	Tummy Trouble	Yes	Story	No	Animated scenes
1990	Roller Coaster Rabbit	Yes	No	No	Animated scenes
1993	Trail Mix-Up	No	Story	Yes	

=== Feature film ===
Year	Title	Director	Producer	Notes
1994	The Lion King	Yes	No	Co-directed with Roger Allers
1999	Stuart Little	Yes	No	
2002	Stuart Little 2	Yes	Executive	
2003	The Haunted Mansion	Yes	Executive	
2008	The Forbidden Kingdom	Yes	No	
2011	Flypaper	Yes	No	
2014	Mr. Peabody & Sherman	Yes	No	Also voiced Creepy Kid
2022	Paws of Fury: The Legend of Hank	Yes	Yes	Co-directed with Mark Koetsier and Chris Bailey, Additional Voices

Animator

Year	Title	Notes
1985	The Black Cauldron	
1986	The Great Mouse Detective	Supervising animator "Olivia"
1987	Sport Goofy in Soccermania	
1987	Amazing Stories	Episode "Family Dog"
1987	The Brave Little Toaster	Character Designer
1988	Technological Threat	
1989	The Little Mermaid	

Other roles

Year	Title	Role
1988	Oliver & Company	Music/lyrics: "Good Company"
1991	Beauty and the Beast	Pre-production script development

=== Television ===
Year	Title	Director	Producer	Notes
2003	Stuart Little	No	Yes	
2009	Leverage	Yes	No	Episode "The Mile High Job"
2010	Aftermath	Yes	Yes	Creator
2015–17	The Mr. Peabody and Sherman Show	No	Yes	
2018	Rainbow Rangers	No	Yes	Co-creator
2021–24	The Real Housewives of Beverly Hills	No	No	Cameo (seasons 11–13)
