= Meego (TV series) =

Television series

- Genre: Science fiction sitcom
- Created by: Ross Brown
- Developed by: Thomas L. Miller; Robert L. Boyett; Michael Warren
- Starring: Bronson Pinchot; Ed Begley Jr.; Erik Von Detten (pilot only); Jonathan Lipnicki; Michelle Trachtenberg; Will Estes
- Theme music composer: Jesse Frederick; Bennett Salvay
- Composers: Jesse Frederick; Bennett Salvay
- Country of origin: United States
- Original language: English
- No. of seasons: 1
- No. of episodes: 13 (7 unaired)

Production
- Executive producers: Ross Brown; Thomas L. Miller; Robert L. Boyett; Michael Warren
- Producer: Karen K. Miller
- Camera setup: Videotape; Multi-camera
- Running time: 22 minutes (approx.)
- Production companies: Miller-Boyett-Warren Productions; Warner Bros. Television

Original release
- Network: CBS
- Release: September 19 – October 24, 1997

Meego is an American science fiction sitcom television series that ran for six episodes from September 19 to October 24, 1997, on the CBS television network as part of its Friday night Block Party program block; after its cancellation, seven additional episodes that were produced but left unaired in the United States were aired in some international markets (such as on Sky1 in the United Kingdom).

Created by Ross Brown, and developed by Thomas L. Miller, Robert L. Boyett, and Michael Warren, the series starred Bronson Pinchot in the title role as an alien masquerading as a human being who, after his spaceship crashlands on Earth, unexpectedly becomes the nanny to a single father's three children.

== Synopsis ==
Meego (Pinchot) is a 9,000-year-old shape-shifting alien from the planet Marmazon 4.0. After his spaceship crashes, he is discovered by three children; Trip (Erik von Detten, later played by Will Estes), Maggie (Michelle Trachtenberg) and Alex Parker (Jonathan Lipnicki). They live with their single father, Dr. Edward Parker (Ed Begley Jr.) and pass Meego off as human (he does not want anyone to know that he is extraterrestrial, and tells people he is from Canada instead). Although he plans to go home as soon as his ship is repaired, he becomes attached to the children and decides to remain on Earth to care for them.

== Cast ==
=== Main ===
The television series' cast members.

- Bronson Pinchot as Meego
- Ed Begley Jr. as Dr. Edward Parker
- Michelle Trachtenberg as Maggie Parker
- Erik von Detten (pilot episode only) and Will Estes (episodes 2–13) as Trip Parker
- Jonathan Lipnicki as Alex Parker

=== Notable guest stars ===
- Jaleel White in the episodes "Love and Money" and "The Truth About Cars and Dogs" (though seen wearing Urkel's eyeglasses, he appears here in uncredited, non-speaking roles as a disgruntled repossessor and a man who blows a whistle at a pinewood derby race).
- Three cast members of Gilligan's Island, Bob Denver, Dawn Wells, and Russell Johnson, had a guest appearance on the episode "Mommy 'n' Meego", which was unaired in the United States.

== Home exteriors ==
The exteriors of the Parker family home on Meego had been recycled from an earlier Miller-Boyett series, On Our Own. The footage of the home was filmed in a suburb of St. Louis, where On Our Own was set; however, in episode "Magic Parker", reference is made to "the greater Chicago area".

== Episodes ==
No.	Title	Directed by	Written by	Original release date	Prod. code	Viewers (millions)
1	"Pilot"	Joel Zwick	Ross Brown	September 19, 1997	475121	8.37
Meego is made temporary babysitter for the Parker kids after his spaceship crashes in their backyard and he waits for repairs to be completed, but quickly finds himself growing attached to them and questioning his return home.
2	"Love and Money"	Rich Correll	Larry Kase & Joel Ronkin	September 26, 1997	466552	7.81
Meego gets his first pay check, but still has a lot to learn about money; Maggie finished up her studies and her new friend, Kyle Quinn play street hockey with her. Family Matters star Jaleel White has an uncredited cameo.
3	"The Truth About Cars and Dogs"	Rich Correll	Shelly Landau	October 3, 1997	466551	8.20
Maggie tries to tell her dad that the family nanny is an alien. Meanwhile, Meego goes on a date with the Parkers' next door neighbor; and Edward helps Alex build a model car for a derby. Jaleel White makes a second cameo appearance.
4	"It's Good to be King"	Rich Correll	Bill Bryan	October 10, 1997	466553	7.43
When Meego hears that Trip is no longer required to study to pass history now that he's the star of the basketball team, which is coached by the history teacher, he gives his own lesson. He shrinks the teacher/coach and leaves him guarded by watchdog Barkley, while he substitutes - as King George III. Meanwhile, Edward and Alex plan a fishing trip.
5	"Fatal Attraction"	Rich Correll	Allison M. Gibson	October 17, 1997	466554	8.07
Trip learns a valuable lesson after he takes Meego's magic wrist device and uses it to trick a popular girl into believing that he's the boy of her dreams. He initially enjoys the attention but changes his mind when his new "girlfriend" Brooke begins shadowing him and hanging on his every word. Meanwhile, Meego plays poker with Edward and some interns.
6	"Halloween"	Joel Zwick	Cary Okmin	October 24, 1997	466556	8.35
Maggie finds out that her secret admirer, Kyle Quinn will be arriving incognito at her Halloween party and enlists Meego's aid in unmasking the mystery man, while he tends to spooky tasks of his own when he sets out to give Trip a scare.
7	"Mommy 'n' Meego"	Rich Correll	Bill Bryan	Unaired	466559	N/A
On Meego's first attempt to phone his alien mom, he ends up reaching three Gilligan's Island castaways instead: Gilligan, Mary Ann and the Professor, still stranded after 35 years! While he continues his quest for a direct line to Marmazon 4.0, Trip, Maggie, and Alex try to keep his origins a secret from their suspicious and cranky grandmother.
8	"Magic Parker"	Rich Correll	Larry Kase & Joel Ronkin	Unaired	466557	N/A
Alex tricks Meego into helping him show off in front of Marcus. Maggie tries to get him to help set up Edward on a date, but while waiting for Alex to finish his martial arts lesson, he meets two other nannies (Erika & Theresa) and asks if they are available, but finds out they are "aliens." Misunderstanding them, he assumes they are from a different planet.
9	"Liar, Liar"	Joel Zwick	Shelly Landau	Unaired	466558	N/A
When Trip lies to get a date with college girl Amanda, Meego embellishes it with his antics. He also encounters snow for the first time.
10	"I Won't Be Home for Christmas"	Rich Correll	Cary Okmin	Unaired	466562	N/A
It's Christmas and Meego tries helping out by doing such things as teleporting the Christmas tree into the house (still tied to the roof of the car) and helping Edward get Alex the toy he wants. It is of course the most popular one of the season and in a mad rush at the department store, his wrist device is broken.
11	"Saturday Night Fever"	Rich Correll	R. Lee Fleming Jr.	Unaired	466555	N/A
Edward has to go away for the weekend to assist an operation. Meego catches the chicken pox with strange side effects. Trip sneaks out of the house at midnight to go to an illegal rave party and Maggie is fed up with being a 'geek' when she wins the model citizen of the month award for the fifth time running so she tries changing her image.
12	"Performance Art"	Joel Zwick	Allison M. Gibson	Unaired	466560	N/A
Meego tries to persuade the kids to take their school field trip to the museum rather than the ice cream parlor. Trip plays sick to get a coveted autograph.
13	"Car and Driver"	Rich Correll	R. Lee Fleming Jr.	Unaired	466561	N/A
Trip is desperate to get his driver's license in order to improve his dating prospects.

== Broadcast ==
Meego was commissioned specifically for the CBS Block Party, an effort to compete with TGIF, the long-running family comedy block on ABC. Incoming CBS head Les Moonves saw an opportunity to take advantage of an ownership change at ABC (then being acquired by The Walt Disney Company, which was reshaping TGIF into a more teen-oriented block) and offered Miller-Boyett Productions US$40 million to bring two of TGIF's programs, Family Matters and Step by Step, to CBS. As part of the deal, Miller-Boyett also received the right to produce a new show, which became Meego.

Meego was unusual among the shows in the CBS Block Party in that it was targeted mainly at children, instead of the whole family. This was a factor in the show's failure; by this point, the show's lead-in, Family Matters, consisted mostly of a cast of young adults, and its lead-out, The Gregory Hines Show (the only show on the block to be produced by CBS and Columbia TriStar Television and with no ties to either Warner Bros. or Miller-Boyett), was also a mostly adult-oriented sitcom. Another factor in the show's failure was its direct competition; Boy Meets World, the program that aired on TGIF opposite Meego, reached its peak in number of viewers during the 1997–98 season. Meego was pulled from the air after six episodes. After holiday specials filled the slot for the next several weeks, Kids Say the Darndest Things replaced Meego on the CBS schedule in January 1998.

== Critical reception ==
The show received mixed to negative reviews.

== Awards and nominations ==
Year	Award	Category	Recipient	Result
1998	Young Artist Award	Best Performance by a Young Actor in a Comedy TV Series	Jonathan Lipnicki	Nominated
1998	Young Artist Award	Best Performance in a TV Comedy Series – Supporting Young Actress	Michelle Trachtenberg	Won
