= Stuart Little =

1945 children's novel by E.B. White

- First edition
- Author: E. B. White
- Illustrator: Garth Williams
- Cover artist: Garth Williams
- Language: English
- Genre: Children's novel
- Publisher: Harper & Brothers
- Publication date: 1945
- Publication place: United States
- Media type: Print (Hardback & Paperback)
- Pages: 128

Stuart Little is a 1945 American children's novel by E. B. White. It was White's first children's book, and became recognized as a classic in children's literature. Stuart Little was illustrated by the artist Garth Williams, also his first work for children.

== Background ==
Michael Sims, author of The Story of Charlotte's Web, wrote that Stuart "arrived in [White's] mind in a direct shipment from the subconscious." In a letter White wrote in response to inquiries from readers, he described how he came to conceive of Stuart Little: "Many years ago, I went to bed one night in a railway sleeping car, and during the night I dreamed about a tiny boy who acted rather like a rat. That's how the story of Stuart Little got started". White had that dream in the spring of 1926, while sleeping on a train on his way back to New York from a visit to the Shenandoah Valley.

White typed up a few stories about Stuart, which he told to his 18 nieces and nephews when they asked him to tell them a story. In 1935, White's wife Katharine showed these stories to Clarence Day, then a regular contributor to The New Yorker. Day liked the stories and encouraged White not to neglect them, but neither Oxford University Press nor Viking Press was interested in the stories, and White did not immediately develop them further.

In the fall of 1938, as his wife wrote her annual collection of children's book reviews for The New Yorker, White wrote a few paragraphs in his "One Man's Meat" column in Harper's Magazine about writing children's books. Anne Carroll Moore, the head children's librarian at the New York Public Library, read this column and responded by encouraging him to write a children's book that would "make the library lions roar".

White's editor at Harper, who had heard about the Stuart stories from Katharine, asked to see them, and by March 1939 was intent on publishing them. Around that time, White wrote to James Thurber that he was "about half done" with the book; however, he did not finish it until the winter of 1944–1945.

== Plot ==
Stuart Little is born to an ordinary family in New York City. He is normal in every way except that he is only just over two inches (5 cm) tall and looks exactly like a mouse, despite being a human child. At first, the family is concerned with how Stuart will survive in a human-sized world, but by the age of seven, he speaks, thinks, and behaves on the level of a human of sixteen and shows surprising ingenuity in adapting, performing such helpful family tasks as fishing his mother's wedding ring from a sink drain. The family's white Persian cat, Snowbell, dislikes Stuart because while he feels a natural instinct to chase him, he is aware that Stuart is a human family member and is thus off-limits.

On a cold winter's day, the family discovers a yellow canary named Margalo half-frozen on their doorstep. Margalo is taken in and spends the winter in the family home, where she befriends Stuart; Stuart in turn protects her from Snowbell. The bird repays his kindness by saving Stuart when he is trapped in a garbage barge and shipped out to sea for disposal. In the spring, when she is set free from the house, she continues to visit Stuart, much to the annoyance of Snowbell, who now finds himself with two small animals he is not allowed to eat.

Snowbell makes a deal with the Angora cat to eat Margalo to get rid of one of his temptations (reasoning that it's only wrong if he eats her). Margalo is warned and flees in the middle of the night. Stuart is heartbroken but becomes determined to find her. He first goes to the local dentist, Dr. Carey. The dentist's patient, Edward Clydesdale, suggests that Margalo may have flown to Connecticut, and Dr. Carey loans Stuart his miniature car for the long journey.

Stuart travels from adventure to adventure and finds himself in the town of Ames Crossing, where he takes work as a substitute teacher. There he learns that living in Ames Crossing is a fifteen-year-old girl named Harriet Ames who is the same size as Stuart but looks like a human being. Stuart purchases a miniature souvenir canoe, prepping it to make it comfortable and waterproof, and invites Harriet out on a boating date. However, when the two arrive for the date, the canoe has been discovered and played with by local children, who have ruined it. Harriet tries to be polite but is put off by Stuart's sulking over his broken boat. Stuart decides to leave Ames Crossing and continue on his quest to find Margalo. He sets off once more in his car, continuing on his mission of exploring the world and finding his friend.

== Reception ==
Lucien Agosta, in his overview of the critical reception of the book, notes that "Critical reactions to Stuart Little have varied from disapprobation to unqualified admiration since the book was published in 1945, though generally it has been well received." Anne Carroll Moore, who had initially encouraged White to write the book, was critical of it when she read a proof of it. She wrote letters to White, his wife Katharine, and Harper's children's editor Ursula Nordstrom, advising that the book not be published.

A 1945 book reviewer wrote, "Mr. White has a tendency to write amusing scenes instead of telling a story. To say that Stuart Little is one of the best children’s books published this year is very modest praise for a writer of his talent." The book has become a children's classic, and is widely read by children and used by teachers. White was awarded the Laura Ingalls Wilder Medal in 1970 for Stuart Little and Charlotte's Web.

== Adaptations ==
=== Audio ===
Actress Julie Harris narrated an unabridged adaptation on LP in two volumes for Pathways of Sound (POS 1036 and 1037). The complete recording was later released on audio cassette by Bantam Audio and on CD by Listening Library.

=== Films ===
The book was loosely adapted into a 1999 film of the same name, which combines live-action with computer animation. In the film, Stuart is an anthropomorphic mouse who is adopted instead of born into the Little family. Margalo is absent, with the plot instead focusing on Stuart's search for his real parents, later revealed to have died years ago, and Snowbell's attempt to get rid of him. The 2002 sequel Stuart Little 2 features Margalo and more closely follows the plot of the book, albeit with the inclusion of an evil falcon who holds Margalo captive. A third film, Stuart Little 3: Call of the Wild was released direct-to-video in 2006. This film is entirely computer-animated, with its plot not derived from the book. None of the film adaptations include the subplots of Stuart being a substitute teacher, meeting Dr. Paul Carey, or encountering a girl his size named Harriet.

All three films feature Hugh Laurie as Mr. Little, Geena Davis as Mrs. Little, and Michael J. Fox as the voice of Stuart Little.

In 2015, it was announced that a remake of Stuart Little is in the works at Sony Pictures Entertainment and Red Wagon Entertainment. The movie will remain hybrid live-action / computer animation. Douglas Wick, the producer of the original films, will produce the remake.

In the 2025 film Blue Moon, Lorenz Hart and E. B. White have a fictional conversation on March 31, 1943, where White reveals he's writing his first novel, aimed at children. Later, Hart tells White a story of a mouse that recurrently enters his apartment who he names Stuart. White is seen taking notes after hearing this.

=== Television ===
"The World of Stuart Little", a 1966 episode of NBC's Children's Theater, narrated by Johnny Carson, won a Peabody Award and was nominated for an Emmy. An animated television series, Stuart Little: The Animated Series (based on the film adaptations) was produced for HBO Family and aired for 13 episodes in 2003.

=== Video games ===
Four video games based on the film adaptations have been produced. Stuart Little: Big City Adventures, released for Microsoft Windows in 1999, is based on the 1999 film. Stuart Little: The Journey Home, which was released only for the Game Boy Color in 2001, is also based on the 1999 film. A game based on Stuart Little 2 was released for the PlayStation, Game Boy Advance and Microsoft Windows in 2002. A fourth game, entitled Stuart Little 3: Big Photo Adventure, was released exclusively for the PlayStation 2 in 2005.

== See also ==
- Conservatory Water, the boating pond on which Stuart Little sails
- Stuart, Florida, the town which served as the inspiration for Stuart's name
