= The Haunted Mansion (2003 film) =

Film by Rob Minkoff

- Theatrical release poster
- Directed by: Rob Minkoff
- Written by: David Berenbaum
- Based on: The Haunted Mansion by Walt Disney
- Produced by: Don Hahn; Andrew Gunn
- Starring: Eddie Murphy; Terence Stamp; Wallace Shawn; Marsha Thomason; Jennifer Tilly
- Cinematography: Remi Adefarasin
- Edited by: Priscilla Nedd-Friendly
- Music by: Mark Mancina
- Production company: Walt Disney Pictures
- Distributed by: Buena Vista Pictures Distribution
- Release date: November 26, 2003
- Running time: 88 minutes
- Country: United States
- Language: English
- Budget: $90 million
- Box office: $182.3 million

The Haunted Mansion is a 2003 American supernatural horror comedy film directed by Rob Minkoff and written by David Berenbaum. Loosely based on the Disneyland attraction of the same name, the film stars Eddie Murphy as a realtor who, along with his family, becomes trapped in the titular building. Terence Stamp, Wallace Shawn, Marsha Thomason and Jennifer Tilly appear in supporting roles.

The film was released in the United States on November 26, 2003, by Buena Vista Pictures Distribution. The film received negative reviews from critics but performed well at the box office, grossing $182.3 million worldwide against a $90 million budget. Despite its initial reviews, the film has developed a cult following over the years. Another film adaptation directed by Justin Simien was released in 2023, 20 years after the film came out.

== Plot ==
In Louisiana, Jim and Sara Evers are successful realtors with a pair of young children, Megan and Michael, but the former's workaholism alienates him from his family. After missing his and Sara's wedding anniversary to pursue a lead, Jim tries to make amends by planning a vacation to the nearby lake. Sara is subsequently contacted by the residents of Gracey Manor about negotiating a sale. Eager to make the deal, Jim has the family stop at the mansion en route, where they meet its owner, Edward Gracey, and his servants; butler Ramsley, maid Emma, and footman Ezra.

When a thunderstorm floods the nearby river, Gracey lets the family stay at the mansion for the night. Ramsley takes Jim to its library to discuss the deal with Gracey, but he becomes trapped in a secret passage. Gracey gives Sara a tour of the mansion, discussing his past and the death of his "grandfather" after the supposed suicide of his lover, Elizabeth Henshaw. The Evers children follow a spectral orb to the mansion's attic and find a painting of a woman resembling Sara. Emma and Ezra soon appear and identify the woman as the late Elizabeth.

Jim meets Madame Leota, the ghost of a gypsy whose head is encased in her crystal ball. He runs into Emma, Ezra, and his children and returns to Leota for answers about Elizabeth's likeness to Sara. It is revealed that the mansion's inhabitants are ghosts, cursed more than a century earlier by Elizabeth's and Gracey's untimely deaths, that can only enter the afterlife when the couple is reunited; Sara is believed to be Elizabeth's reincarnation, though Leota cautions that things are not as they seem. She sends the Evers to the mansion's cemetery to find a key that will reveal the truth about Elizabeth's death. In a crypt beneath a mausoleum, Jim and Megan find the key, but inadvertently disturb its undead occupants. The duo narrowly escape with help from Michael, who overcomes his arachnophobia when they are locked in.

Leota leads them to a locked trunk in the attic, in which Jim finds a letter that Elizabeth wrote to Gracey, revealing her intent to marry him and indicating that she was murdered. Ramsley appears and it is revealed that he murdered Elizabeth to prevent his master from abandoning his heritage, as he believed their relationship was unacceptable. To hide the truth, Ramsley detains the children in another trunk and literally throws Jim out of the mansion, subsequently enchanting it to keep him at bay. As Gracey and Sara rendezvous in the ballroom, she is confused when he asks if she recognizes him and insists she is Elizabeth.

The room fills with dancing ghosts as Gracey reveals his true colors, but Sara denies being Elizabeth and flees to her room. Gracey starts to have doubts, but Ramsley insists that Sara is Elizabeth and will eventually remember as he blackmails her into marrying Gracey in exchange for her children's safety. Encouraged by Leota, Jim breaks into the mansion, rescuing the children and stopping the wedding. He gives Elizabeth's letter to Gracey, who furiously confronts Ramsley as he rages at his master's apparent selfishness for loving Elizabeth and summons wraiths to attack the group. However, with the truth revealed, a demon emerges from the ballroom's fireplace and drags Ramsley down to Hell. He attempts to take Jim with him, but he is saved by Gracey.

Sara collapses, having been poisoned by Ramsley during the wedding ceremony. The spectral orb appears and, possessing Sara, is revealed to be Elizabeth, who could only be freed from this form once the truth was revealed; she and Gracey reunite as Sara is revived. With the curse lifted, Gracey gives the Evers the deed to the mansion and departs to Heaven with Elizabeth and the mansion's inhabitants. The Evers set off for their intended vacation, accompanied by Leota and a quartet of singing busts that they encountered in the cemetery.

== Cast ==
- Eddie Murphy as Jim Evers, a successful yet workaholic real estate agent who is often late for family gatherings, but tries his best to make up for it
- Terence Stamp as Ramsley, the ghost of Gracey Manor's butler who serves as a father figure to Master Gracey. He is later revealed to be responsible for Elizabeth's death.
- Nathaniel Parker as Master Edward Gracey, the ghost of Gracey Manor's owner who longs for his lost love, Elizabeth Henshaw, to return to him after her apparent suicide. The character is a three-way combination of the Ghost Host, the Aging Man portrait and the eponymous character from the source material.
- Marsha Thomason as:
  - Sara Evers, Jim's disapproving wife and business partner
  - Elizabeth Henshaw, the ghost of Master Gracey's long lost lover who bears a striking resemblance to Sara. She is loosely based on the source material's bride characters.
- Jennifer Tilly as Madame Leota, the ghost of a Romani woman whose head is encased in her crystal ball
- Wallace Shawn as Ezra, the ghost of a bumbling footman who worries about getting into trouble
- Dina Spybey as Emma, the ghost of a nervous but helpful maid who seems terrified of Ramsley
- Marc John Jefferies as Michael Evers, Jim and Sara's arachnophobic son
- Aree Davis as Megan Evers, Jim and Sara's impatient daughter
- Jim Doughan as Mr. Coleman, a picky client of Jim's
- Rachael Harris as Mrs. Coleman, Coleman's open-minded wife
- Steve Hytner as Mr. Silverman, an annoying client of Jim's
- Heather Juergensen as Mrs. Silverman, Silverman's equally annoying wife
- Jeremy Howard, Deep Roy and Clay Martinez as the Hitchhiking Ghosts
- The Dapper Dans as the voices of the Singing Busts. (Note: According to the end credits of the film, "the singing busts are performed by The Dapper Dans", composed by Shelby Grimm, Harry J. Campbell, William T. Lewis, Tim Reeder, and Bob Hartley.) The characters are depicted as a quartet rather than a quintet like in the source material.
- Corey Burton as the voice of the Ghost Host (uncredited). Burton was cast as a tribute to Paul Frees, the character's original portrayer in the source material.

The film's chief makeup artist Rick Baker appears in the graveyard sequence as a background ghost seen behind a gravestone, using an appearance based on a portrait of the Ghost Host from the source material. The cast additionally includes an uncredited Martin Klebba as Pickwick, one of the ghosts in the graveyard, albeit unnamed and only credited as "Happy Ghost" and director Rob Minkoff's nephew Zach, who appears as a paperboy in the opening scene.

== Production ==
In January 2002, it was announced Disney had formally greenlit The Haunted Mansion with the script written by David Berenbaum.

The original concept for the film's setting was Upstate New York, with the mansion's exterior modeled after the Walt Disney World version. However, to keep the faithfulness of the original attraction's location in the New Orleans Square section of Disneyland, the producers changed the setting to New Orleans, Louisiana. To allude to the two versions of the attraction and create a more foreboding atmosphere, the production enlarged the film mansion, basing its designs on the original attraction while adding the iron and glass conservatory on its side from the Florida version of the ride.

The mansion scenes were filmed at Sable Ranch in Santa Clarita, California. The main building was constructed over a period of weeks while the cupola and chimneys on the top of the mansion were computer-generated. The rest of film was shot in New Orleans and surrounding areas.

A quintet of Hidden Mickeys are seen throughout the film similar to the ride; the most notable ones being the padlock at the mansion's gates, the second when an axe wielded by a possessed suit of armor nearly hits Jim, and a third which is briefly seen when Ramsley poisons a goblet of wine during the wedding ceremony. The other two are the couch in the library and the windows on the doors Jim passes when he is chased by musical instruments summoned by Madame Leota. Before leaving the mansion via a hearse to find the mausoleum, Ezra exclaims "there's always my way," a pivotal line of dialogue from the attraction.

The costume and special effects designers wanted the ghost characters to become "more dead" the farther they were from the mansion. While Ezra and Emma look human in the house, their leaving it causes them to become blue and transparent to show they are ghosts. The zombies in the mausoleum were described as the "deadest as they are farthest away." Rick Baker, the chief costume designer, did the prosthetic makeup for the zombies in the mausoleum, using skull-based heads for their designs. He also designed one of the zombies as an elderly man holding a cane in order to make the scene less frightening for viewers.

The ghostly effects in the film were created both practically and digitally. A combination of SteadiCam, real-time motion control, and bluescreen photography was used when filming ghosts. When ghosts needed to interact with other ghosts or humans, 3D rotoscoping processes were used to preserve transparency.

== Music ==
The music for The Haunted Mansion was composed by Mark Mancina who had previously worked on music for Disney animated films such as The Lion King, Tarzan and Brother Bear (which came out that same year). Mancina used an original score for the film, but also briefly used the ride's song "Grim Grinning Ghosts" done by Buddy Baker in the scene when Jim and his children come across the Singing Busts in the cemetery while looking for the mausoleum.

== Reception ==
=== Box office ===
The Haunted Mansion grossed $24.3 million on its opening weekend with an average of $7,776 per theatre in the United States, ranking second behind The Cat in the Hat. With a final domestic gross at $75.8 million, the film made just more than a quarter of the earnings of its theme-ride predecessor Pirates of the Caribbean: The Curse of the Black Pearl. The film achieved better in other markets, with an international total of $106.4 million.

=== Critical response ===
On Rotten Tomatoes, the film has an approval percentage of 14% based on 140 reviews and a rating of 4.30/10. The critics consensus reads: "Neither scary nor funny, The Haunted Mansion is as lifeless as the ghosts in the movie." On Metacritic, the film has a score of 34 out of 100 based on 34 critic reviews, indicating "generally unfavorable reviews". Audiences polled by CinemaScore gave the film an average grade of "B" on an A+ to F scale.

David Sterritt of Christian Science Monitor wrote, "While it may supply giggles and shivers to preteens, grownups should think twice before entering this all-too-haunted house." Roger Ebert in The Chicago Sun-Times gave the film two and a half stars out of a possible four, writing "The surprising thing about "The Haunted Mansion" isn't that it's based on a Disney theme park ride, but that it has ambition. It wants to be more than a movie version of the ride. I expected an inane series of nonstop action sequences, but what I got was a fairly intriguing story and an actual plot that is actually resolved. That doesn't make the movie good enough to recommend, but it makes it better than the ads suggest." In one of the film's positive reviews, Sheri Linden of Hollywood Reporter called the film "A pleasant and atmospheric family romp, offering enough mildly chilling thrills to keep everyone entertained during its brief running time."

Mike Clark of USA Today gave the film a rating of zero-and-a-half out of four, stating that "a Disney Thanksgiving movie that plays like a Halloween holdover is odd enough. Even so, it wouldn't be that bad if you stuck your hand into the trick-or-treat bag and found a hefty, succulently dressed and edible turkey instead of the other kind. The movie's horror angle also reminds us of Vampire in Brooklyn, the last in a string of Murphy flops before The Nutty Professor saved his screen career in 1996. With this listless foray, Eddie is twice bitten." Owen Gleiberman of Entertainment Weekly gave it a "D+", explaining that "The Haunted Mansion is tame and witless enough to make me long for the ancient, dusty fright kitsch of The Munsters." In a one out of five review, Elvis Mitchell of The New York Times described it as "the film equivalent of the dark, boring period on a haunted house ride before the gondola crashes into another room filled with dirty mirrors."

== Legacy ==
Although considered a critical failure and a decent box office success upon its release, The Haunted Mansion has undergone a reassessment over the past several years. Like Clue (1985), The Monster Squad (1987), and Hocus Pocus (1993), all similar dark-yet-broadly-comical films that initially opened to poor reviews and disappointing box office results before growing an appreciative audience over time, The Haunted Mansion has grown in popularity since its original theatrical run and has achieved cult status, as noted by media outlets such as Insider. and Full Circle Cinema.

The Haunted Mansion is now a popular Halloween film and is regularly featured on Halloween season cable programming blocks such as Freeform's 31 Nights of Halloween. The film also appears on many lists of "Best Halloween Movies" (especially the youth-centric lists) including those of Elle, Country Living, Today, We Got This Covered, Woman's Day, Redbook, Good Housekeeping, The Hollywood Reporter and others.

In January 2023, Eddie Murphy was critical about the film, stating "It wasn't very good".

In October 2023, to celebrate the film's 20th anniversary, many crew members who worked on the film including director Rob Minkoff, screenwriter David Berenbaum, costume designer Mona May, composer Mark Mancina and cast member Nathaniel Parker reunited by participating in a livestream on YouTube on The Tammy Tuckey Show. The event had been organized ahead of time.

== Home media ==
The film was released on VHS and DVD on April 20, 2004. The film was released on Blu-ray on October 17, 2006.

== Reboot ==
In July 2010, it was announced that a reboot adaptation based on Disney's The Haunted Mansion was in development for Walt Disney Pictures, with Guillermo del Toro as writer and producer. The film remained in development until Ryan Gosling entered early negotiations to star in April 2015, while D.V. DeVincentis was hired to rewrite the script. In September 2016, Brigham Taylor was hired as an additional producer.

In August 2020, it was announced that writer Katie Dippold would write a new screenplay, and that Dan Lin and Jonathan Eirich would co-produce. Justin Simien signed on as director in April 2021, and Tiffany Haddish, Lakeith Stanfield, Owen Wilson, Rosario Dawson, and Danny DeVito had all signed on to star by October that same year. The film was released on July 28, 2023.

== See also ==
- List of ghost films
