= Camp Pleasant Lake =

2024 horror film

- Theatrical release poster
- Directed by: Thomas Walton
- Screenplay by: Thomas Walton
- Produced by: Jared Safier; Thomas Walton
- Starring: Jonathan Lipnicki; Bonnie Aarons; Andrew Divoff
- Cinematography: David M. Parks
- Edited by: George Lambriodes; John Mark Triplett
- Music by: Reuven Herman
- Production companies: Safier Entertainment; PhilaDreams Films; Lux Angeles Studios; Mahal Empire; Movies by Misfits; RMR Productions; Stag Mountain Films
- Distributed by: Deskpop Entertainment; Safier Entertainment; Starz
- Release date: February 27, 2024
- Running time: 90 minutes
- Country: United States
- Language: English

Camp Pleasant Lake is a 2024 American slasher film that takes place in a camp around a 20-year-old mystery regarding a missing girl.

== Cast ==
- Jonathan Lipnicki as Jasper Meadows
- Bonnie Aarons as Esmeralda
- Andrew Divoff as Evil Man
- Mike Ferguson as Lucifer 'Lou'
- Amber Oliver as Sheena
- Sajid Ali as Gabe
- Michael Paré as Rick Rutherford
- Robert LaSardo as Angel
- Tyrone Evans Clark as Julian
- Anne-Marie Olsen as Kim
- Kelly Lynn Reiter as Echo Meadows
- Devanny Pinn as Harper
- Jody Nolan as Ross
- Elley Ringo as Grace
- Tom Batchelder as Logan
- Ashley Medina Perez as Bayley
- Peter Augustine as Mitchell
- Adam Treasure as Jamal Davis
- William Delesk as Young Jasper
- William Bowker as Lenny
- James Di Giacomo as John Meadows
- Leila Almas Rose as Ruby Meadows
- Jackson Everest as Hunter
- Sophie Welch as Młoda Harper
- Paul Gunn as Clay
- Jean Heathen as Joanne
- Lacey Burdine as Young Echo
- Joe Barlam as Wyatt
- Scott Alan Ward as Charles
- Thomas Walton as Camp bus driver
- Elizabeth Noelle as Andrea
- Anson Days as Terrance
- Christopher Sky as Mike Wilson
- Collin Lee Turner as Jacob
- Mary Jones as Isabelle
- Randy Pascuzzi as Jackson

== Release ==
The film was released in selective theaters and VOD platforms on February 27, 2024.

== Reception ==
On the review aggregator website Rotten Tomatoes, 18% of 11 critics' reviews are positive.

Matt Donato of Bloody Disgusting rated it 1.5/5 "skulls" writing that "there's nothing exceptional about Camp Pleasant Lake despite dialogue that tries to cheekily serve up 'epic' sequences of violence." Michael Gingold of Rue Morgue calling it "tedious and grating to downright insulting to the intelligence. Even the most die-hard of slasher fans are advised to take their vacation elsewhere."

J Hurtado of Screen Anarchy wrote, "There's nothing new in Camp Pleasant Lake, and the things that are familiar aren't even executed well, leaving the audience to wonder what exactly is the point?"
