= Stuart Little (film) =

1999 film directed by Rob Minkoff

- Theatrical release poster
- Directed by: Rob Minkoff
- Screenplay by: M. Night Shyamalan; Greg Brooker
- Based on: Stuart Little by E. B. White
- Produced by: Douglas Wick
- Starring: Geena Davis; Hugh Laurie; Jonathan Lipnicki
- Cinematography: Guillermo Navarro
- Edited by: Tom Finan
- Music by: Alan Silvestri
- Production companies: Columbia Pictures; Red Wagon Entertainment; Franklin/Waterman Productions; Global Medien KG
- Distributed by: Sony Pictures Releasing
- Release dates: December 5, 1999 (Mann Village Theatre); December 17, 1999 (United States)
- Running time: 84 minutes
- Country: United States
- Language: English
- Budget: $105–133 million
- Box office: $300.1 million

Stuart Little is a 1999 American live-action animated comedy film loosely based on E. B. White's novel of the same name. The film was directed by Rob Minkoff (in his live-action directorial debut) and produced by Douglas Wick, from a screenplay by M. Night Shyamalan and Greg Brooker. It features an ensemble cast consisting of Geena Davis, Hugh Laurie and Jonathan Lipnicki, with the voices of Michael J. Fox as the titular character, Nathan Lane, Chazz Palminteri, Steve Zahn, Bruno Kirby and Jennifer Tilly. It was Estelle Getty's final film role before her retirement in 2001 and death in 2008.

Stuart Little premiered at the Mann Village Theatre in Westwood on December 5, 1999, and was released in the United States on December 17, by Sony Pictures Releasing through its Columbia Pictures label. The film received generally positive reviews and became a box office success, grossing over $300 million worldwide. It was nominated for an Academy Award for Best Visual Effects, but lost to The Matrix. After its success, it also started a franchise with the sequel Stuart Little 2 in 2002, the short-lived television series Stuart Little in 2003, and the direct-to-video sequel Stuart Little 3: Call of the Wild in 2006.

== Plot ==
In Manhattan, Frederick and Eleanor Little visit an orphanage to adopt a new brother for their son, George. Instead, they adopt an anthropomorphic mouse named Stuart. George refuses to acknowledge him as his brother and the family cat, Snowbell, is disgusted to be a new pet to a mouse. The next day, Stuart's life in the house goes off to a bad start when he falls ill after being trapped in the washing machine, but he soon recovers from the incident.

The Littles invite their extended family to meet Stuart where George confesses he does not regard Stuart as a brother but simply a mouse. Stuart asks Eleanor and Frederick to enquire about his biological parents, feeling an empty space. The next day, after accidentally falling into George's basement playroom, Stuart encourages George to finish his model boat for an upcoming race as a bond starts to build. Meanwhile, Snowbell and his alley cat friend Monty meet with Monty's superior, Smokey, and formulate a plan to dispose of Stuart. On the day of the race, while Stuart is carrying George's remote control he accidentally drops it and it gets accidentally stepped on by a passerby, rendering the boat useless. He jumps into the boat and takes control himself, narrowly avoiding a crash and winning the race, finally enabling George to accept Stuart as his brother.

As the Littles host a celebration with the family, a mouse couple, Reggie and Camille Stout, arrive and claim to be Stuart's biological parents who were forced by poverty to give him up. The Littles reluctantly allow Stuart to leave with the Stouts. Three days later, the orphanage head Mrs. Keeper comes to visit the Littles to check up on things and when they explain that Stuart's real parents came and took him away, she informs them that Stuart's real parents had died several years earlier from a grocery store incident. Realizing Stuart has been kidnapped, the family organizes a search party with missing person posters, using his photograph from the family photo. Fearing his involvement will be exposed and that he will be thrown out of the Little house, Snowbell informs Smokey about the news and Smokey settles on assassinating Stuart instead. Remorseful about Stuart's sadness, the Stouts, now revealed to be reluctant pawns of Smokey, reveal their deception.

He is delighted and makes his way back to the Little house. On the way, he is ambushed by Smokey and his gang but evades them by going into a sewer. He makes it home, but finds the Littles absent as they had left to go put up his missing posters. A jealous Snowbell lies that the family is out celebrating his absence, using the fact that Stuart's face has been removed from the family photo as evidence. Thoroughly crestfallen, Stuart leaves, but Snowbell soon regrets his actions after the Littles return home. Smokey and his gang manage to pinpoint Stuart's location at Central Park and bring Snowbell along for the hunt. However, Snowbell finds Stuart first and admits his lie, encouraging Stuart to come home. When the cats find them, Snowbell refuses to hand Stuart over to the cats and Smokey tells his gang to assassinate both Stuart and Snowbell. They give chase, cornering Stuart hanging from a branch over the park's pond. Snowbell breaks the branch beneath the cats, sending them plummeting into the pond. Smokey sneaks up on Snowbell, enraged by his betrayal but Stuart releases a thin branch at Smokey, knocking him into the water. He emerges, but is immediately chased away by dogs.

Stuart is taken home by Snowbell and they arrive just as the Littles are going to bed. He taps on the window and is reunited with the Littles after George happily notices him. When they ask him how he managed to get home, he tells them that every Little can find the Little house and he owes his life to Snowbell, who has realized Stuart truly is family.

== Cast ==
=== Voice cast ===
- Michael J. Fox as Stuart Little, a young white anthropomorphic mouse who is adopted as the middle child of the Little family.
- Nathan Lane as Snowbell, the family's Persian cat who initially dislikes Stuart, but later becomes his best friend.
- Chazz Palminteri as Smokey, a Chartreux who is the leader of a gang of alley cats and comes up with a plot to eliminate Stuart when summoned by Snowbell and Monty.
- Steve Zahn as Monty, a gray tabby cat, Snowbell's best friend and a former member of Smokey's gang.
- Jim Doughan as Lucky, a Siamese cat who is a member of Smokey's gang. Doughan also portrays Detective Allen in the film.
- David Alan Grier as Red, a ginger American Shorthair tomcat who is a member of Smokey's gang.
- Bruno Kirby as Reginald Stout, Camille's husband.
- Jennifer Tilly as Camille Stout, Reginald's wife.
- Stan Freberg as the boat race announcer

=== Live-action cast ===
- Geena Davis as Eleanor Little, the matriarch of the Little family and Frederick's wife.
- Hugh Laurie as Frederick Little, the patriarch of the Little family and Eleanor's husband.
- Jonathan Lipnicki as George Little, the eldest son of the Little family and Stuart's adoptive older brother.
- Jeffrey Jones as Crenshaw Little, Frederick's elder brother, the younger brother of Beatrice and one of George and Stuart's two uncles.
- Connie Ray as Tina Little, Crenshaw's wife and Beatrice and Frederick's sister-in-law and one of George and Stuart's two aunts.
- Allyce Beasley as Beatrice Little, Crenshaw and Frederick's elder sister and one of George and Stuart's two aunts.
- Brian Doyle-Murray as Edgar Little, Beatrice, Crenshaw and Frederick's cousin and Grandpa Spencer's nephew.
- Estelle Getty as Estelle Little, Beatrice, Crenshaw and Frederick's mother and George and Stuart's grandmother.
- Harold Gould as Spencer Little, Beatrice, Crenshaw and Frederick's father and George and Stuart's grandfather.
- Patrick Thomas O'Brien as Stretch Little, the husband of Beatrice, the brother-in-law of Crenshaw and Frederick and one of George and Stuart's two uncles.
- Julia Sweeney as Mrs. Keeper, the head of the New York City Public Orphanage.
- Dabney Coleman as Doctor Beechwood, a medical doctor who visits the Littles' house following Stuart's entrapment in the washing machine.
- Miles Marsico as Anton Gartman, a mean-spirited boy who bullies George during the boat race.
- Jon Polito as Detective Sherman, a police detective who works for the New York Police Department.
- Jim Doughan as Detective Phil Allen, Detective Sherman's partner. Doughan also voices Lucky, a member of Smokey's gang, in the film.
- Joe Bays as the boat race starter
- Taylor Negron as a clothing salesman

== Production ==
=== Development and pre-production ===
Development began at Columbia Pictures in 1997 when production stalled on a film adaptation of the musical Into the Woods, which Rob Minkoff was originally set to make his live action directorial debut with. Looking for an alternative route, the studio heads informed him that they had picked up the film rights to E. B. White's novel with Douglas Wick set to produce under his Red Wagon Entertainment banner. It was after reading M. Night Shyamalan's script that he then agreed to direct. In early 1998, Columbia officially announced Minkoff as director, with the budget originally set to be under $90 million.

While his first full-length live action film, Minkoff directed various short films combining live-action and animation earlier in his career, all of which helped him earn the job, alongside the overwhelming success of his co-directoral work on Disney's The Lion King (1994). All the cats featured in the film were real and were trained by Boone's Animals for Hollywood. News outlets originally claimed the film would be G-rated, but the darker tone of the third act would result in the MPAA giving it a PG rating.

=== Filming ===
Principal photography began on August 3, 1998, both on location in New York City and Central Park, and on soundstages at the Sony Pictures Studios in Culver City, California, where Stage 30 was converted into the set for the boat race scene and Stage 15 became the exterior of the 5th Avenue street on which the Little family lives. After twelve weeks, filming wrapped on November 11. The entire shoot was described as "smooth" and "enjoyable" by the crew members.

=== Lost painting unknowingly used on set ===
One of the paintings used as set dressing for the Littles' home was Hungarian avant-garde painter Róbert Berény's 1920s painting Sleeping Lady with Black Vase, which had long been considered lost. A set designer for the film had purchased the painting at an antiques store in Pasadena, California, for $500 for use in the film, unaware of its significance. In 2009, art historian Gergely Barki, while watching Stuart Little on television with his daughter, noticed the painting, and after contacting the studios was able to track down its whereabouts. In 2014, its owner sold the painting at an auction for €229,500.

== Soundtrack ==
The soundtrack album Stuart Little: Music from and Inspired by the Motion Picture was released by Motown and Universal Records on November 30, 1999, on audio CD and audio cassette. It contains songs from and inspired by the film, including the end credits song "You're Where I Belong," written by Diane Warren and performed by Trisha Yearwood, which was submitted for Best Original Song consideration at the 72nd Academy Awards, but didn't make the initial shortlist. Also included are two tracks from the orchestral score by Alan Silvestri. Tracks in bold do not appear in the film.

No.	Title	Writer(s)	Producer(s)	Length
1.	"**I Need to Know**" (**R Angels**)	**Vaughn Stewart & John Mortera**	**John Mortera & Vaughn Stewart**	**3:54**
2.	"**The Two of Us**" (**S Club 7**)	**Bobby Guy, Ernie Lake & Majorie Maye**	**Soul Solution**	**3:35**
3.	"You're Where I Belong" (Trisha Yearwood)	Dianne Warren	Keith Thomas for Yellow Elephant Music, Inc.	4:17
4.	"If You Can't Rock Me" (The Brian Setzer Orchestra)	Brian Setzer	Peter Collins	2:40
5.	"1+1=2" (Lou Bega)	Lou Bega, Zippy D. Fact & Frank Lio	Syndicate Music/Frank Lio & D. Fact	4:04
6.	"**He Rules**" (**702**)	**Nicole Renée, Ken Ross, D.C. Jennings & Eric Johnson**	**Eric Johnson & D. Christopher Jennings for Eristopher Entertainment**	**3:04**
7.	"**Home**" (**Brian McKnight**)	**Brian McKnight**	**Brian McKnight**	**4:22**
8.	"Walking Tall" (Lyle Lovett)	Burt Bacharach & Tim Rice	Burt Bacharach & Elliot Lune	3:16
9.	"**Lucky Day**" (**Matt Goss**)	**Matt Goss, Carol Bayer Sager & Eve Nelson**	**Bag & Arnthor for Murlyn Music**	**4:03**
10.	"**Mouse in the House**" (**Colby O'Donis**)	**Nicole Renée, Full Force, Ken Ross, Eric Johnson & Chris Jennings**	**FULL FORCE for Forceful Enterprises, Inc.**	**4:34**
11.	"**As Long as I Can Dream**" (**Debelah Morgan**)	**Dianne Warren**	**Narada Michael Walden for Perfection Light Productions**	**4:27**
12.	"The Boat Race" (Alan Silvestri)	Alan Silvestri	Alan Silvestri	5:12
13.	"I'm Gonna Miss You" (Alan Silvestri)	Alan Silvestri	Alan Silvestri	4:43
14.	"**You're Where I Belong (Soul Solution Remix)**" (**Trisha Yearwood**)	**Dianne Warren**	**Soul Solution**	**4:04**
Total length:				56:15

== Reception ==
=== Box office ===
Stuart Little was released theatrically on December 17, 1999. On its opening weekend, Stuart Little grossed $15 million, placing it at #1 dethroning Toy Story 2. It dropped to #2 over its second weekend, but went back to #1 on its third weekend with $16 million. According to Box Office Mojo, its final gross in the United States and Canada was $140 million and it grossed $160.1 million at the international box office, for an estimated total of $300 million worldwide.

=== Critical reception ===
Stuart Little received positive reviews from critics upon release. On the review aggregator website Rotten Tomatoes, 67% of 97 critics' reviews are positive, with an average rating of 6.4/10. The website's consensus reads: "Critics say Stuart Little is charming with kids and adults for its humor and visual effects." Metacritic, which uses a weighted average, assigned the film a score of 61 out of 100, based on 32 critics, indicating "generally favorable" reviews. Audiences polled by CinemaScore gave the film an average grade of "A−" on an A+ to F scale.

Jesus Freak Hideout said that "from start to finish, Stuart Little is a near flawless family film" while Stephen Holden of The New York Times had said "the only element that doesn't completely harmonize with the rest of the film is the visually unremarkable digital figure of Stuart." In addition, Nell Minow of Common Sense Media praised the film as a "terrific movie for families" due to its themes of being accepted and belonging to one another.

However, Roger Ebert of the Chicago Sun-Times gave the film two stars out of four, stating that the plot of a human family adopting a mouse strained logic and undermined the film's emotional stakes, despite praising its technical polish. In addition, Lael Lowenstein of Variety criticized the film's "slick, commercial approach" that transformed E. B. White's subtle magic of the source material into a "labored feel-good movie," with the uneven humor and underdeveloped human characters overshadowing the animated ones.

== Home media ==
Stuart Little was released on VHS and DVD in the United States on April 18, 2000, by Columbia TriStar Home Video, and in the United Kingdom on November 27, 2000. It was later re-released on a Deluxe Edition on May 21, 2002, by Columbia TriStar Home Entertainment. In 2008, the film was released as part of a double feature with Stuart Little 2. Stuart Little and Stuart Little 2 were released in a combo on Sony PSP's UMD format on January 3, 2006, and Blu-ray on June 28, 2011, by Sony Pictures Home Entertainment.
