= Greg Brooker (screenwriter) =

American screenwriter

Greg Brooker is an American screenwriter, best known for co-writing the screenplay of Stuart Little with M. Night Shyamalan.

== Filmography ==
- I'm on Fire (1998) (Actor)
- Stuart Little (1999) (Screenplay)
- Birthday (1999) (Director)
- Nosferatu L.A. '02 (2002) (Director)
- A.W.O.L (2006) (Actor)
- Joe Dick (2009) (Very Special Thanks)
- Christopher Robin (2018) (Story)
