= Marc John Jefferies =

American actor

- Born: Bronx, New York, U.S.
- Occupation: Actor
- Years active: 1995–present
- Height: 5 ft 3 in (160 cm)
- Website: www.marcjohnj.com

Marc John Jefferies is an American actor known for his roles in Losing Isaiah, Get Rich or Die Tryin', Power, The Haunted Mansion, Nerve, Stuart Little 2, Brown Sugar and Notorious.

== Career ==
Jefferies began his career as a child model, then actor. His first major film role was in Losing Isaiah, opposite Halle Berry. Jefferies had roles throughout his childhood, and continued his work as an adult, including the films Get Rich or Die Tryin', Notorious, and Brotherly Love. Some of his most notable television roles are Darius on Treme and QDubs on Power. Marc John Jefferies founded the MJJ Acting Academy where he trains actors to discover their own unique acting style. In 2023, he starred opposite Wakeema Hollis in Aurora: A Love Story.

== Personal life ==
Jefferies was raised as a Jehovah's Witness.

== Filmography ==
=== Film ===
- Losing Isaiah (1995) - Isaiah
- Stuart Little 2 (2002) - Will Powell
- Brown Sugar (2002) - Young Dre
- Friday After Next (2002) - Kid (Uncredited)
- Charlie's Angels: Full Throttle (2003) - Bus-Stop Kid
- The Haunted Mansion (2003) - Michael Evers
- Spider-Man 2 (2004) - Amazed Kid #1
- Get Rich or Die Tryin' (2005) - Young Marcus
- Keeping Up with the Steins (2006) - Tim
- Notorious (2009) - Lil' Cease
- Big Mommas: Like Father, Like Son (2011) - Rembrandt
- Brotherly Love (2015) - Bunch
- Supermodel (2015) - Shucky
- Nerve (2016) - Wes
- Chocolate City: Vegas Strip (2017) - Carlton
- Equal Standard (2020) - Kenny Williamson
- 13th and Pine (2022) - Tony
- Rock the Boat (2023) - Kaleb

=== Television ===
- New York Undercover (1995) - Kevin Wolfred
- Cosby (1997) - Davy
- Hangin' with Mr. Cooper (1997) - Herman
- Homicide: Life on the Street (1997) - Jack Collins
- Trinity (1998) - Kid #2
- Law & Order: Special Victims Unit (2000) - Jonathan
- The Practice (2001) - Jason Lees
- Third Watch (2002) - Miguel White
- Stuart Little (2003) - Will Powell (voice)
- The Tracy Morgan Show (2003–2004) - Derrick Mitchell
- Justice League Unlimited (2004) - Young Green Lantern (voice)
- Fatherhood (2004–2005) - Roy Bindlebeep
- ER (2005) - Victor Hopkins
- 3 lbs (2006) - Adam
- Dexter (2008) - Wendell Owens
- Treme (2010) - Darius
- Law & Order: Special Victims Unit (2012) - Hasdrubal
- Power (2015) - QDubs
- Blue Bloods (2017) - Omar Davis
- City on a Hill (2021) - Rickey Townsend
