= Jonathan Lipnicki =

American actor (born 1990)

- Lipnicki at the Folds of Honor North Texas Gala, November 2024
- Born: Jonathan William Lipnicki; October 22, 1990 (age 36); Westlake Village, California, U.S.
- Occupation: Actor
- Years active: 1996–present
- Notable work: Jerry Maguire, The Little Vampire, Stuart Little films
- Website: jonathanlipnicki.com

Jonathan William Lipnicki (born October 22, 1990) is an American actor who is known for his roles as a child actor. He has appeared in films such as Jerry Maguire (1996), Stuart Little (1999) and Stuart Little 2 (2002), The Little Vampire (2000), and Like Mike (2002). He also acted in the television series Dawson's Creek on The WB and Meego on CBS.

== Early life ==
Jonathan William Lipnicki was born on October 22, 1990, in Westlake Village, California, to Joseph Lipnicki and Rhonda Rosen. He has an older sister, Alexis. His father owns the mixed martial arts promotion firm Fight Sports Entertainment. His family is Jewish and he had a Bar Mitzvah.

He was educated at Agoura High School, a public secondary school in the city of Agoura Hills in Los Angeles County, California.

== Career ==
Lipnicki played the son of a single parent in his film debut Jerry Maguire. He subsequently appeared on The Single Guy, The Jeff Foxworthy Show as well as episodes of Dawson's Creek and the 1997 sitcom, Meego. He played George Little in Stuart Little and its sequel Stuart Little 2.

He also played the lead, Tony Thompson, in the 2000 film, The Little Vampire and co-starred with hip-hop rapper Bow Wow in the 2002 sports film, Like Mike, which was released two weeks before Stuart Little 2. The latter films did relatively well in theaters, and Lipnicki has become known among preteen audiences, although he has focused mostly on independent films.

Lipnicki has also appeared in the season preview of Jamie Kennedy's Blowin' Up and When Zachary Beaver Came to Town.

He appeared on the comedy Motherlover on the YOMYOMF Network. Lipnicki currently trains in mixed martial arts styles, but when asked whether he planned to ever fight professionally, he replied, "I've been pretty busy filming and I would need to put off a certain amount of time to really train for a fight and be in amazing cardio shape and really work on my striking more. I'm not saying no and I'm not saying yes."

Lipnicki completed lead roles in the horror-thriller motion picture Broil, produced by the team behind It Follows, and the comedy-drama motion picture Pooling To Paradise opposite Taryn Manning and Jordan Carlos. He also guest-starred in Antoine Fuqua's and Philip Noyce's The Resident.

In 2022, it was announced to the public that Lipnicki will be starring in the horror film Camp Pleasant Lake as the character Jasper Meadows.

In 2023, he became an executive producer at Buffalo 8 Productions.

== Philanthropy ==
Lipnicki has been a speaker for the Breast Cancer Research Foundation and is actively involved with the Juvenile Diabetes Research Foundation, the Starlight Children's Foundation and the NBA's Read to Achieve program. The Juvenile Diabetes Research Foundation named Lipnicki one of its "Heroes of 2001" at the age of ten, for his work with the organization.

Additionally, Lipnicki has been an international spokesperson for Pediatric Chiropractic and Kids Day America/International and has worked with animal rights groups such as Pets and Their Stars and the Nutz for Mutts group.

== Personal life ==
Lipnicki is a trained martial arts practitioner and holds a black belt in Brazilian jiu-jitsu. In 2021, following an uptick in antisemitic attacks, Lipnicki teamed up with security firm Magen Am to escort Jews to synagogues. He currently resides in Oklahoma after becoming executive producer for Buffalo 8 Production.

== Filmography ==
=== Film ===
Key
| † | Denotes films that have not yet been released |

| Year | Title | Role | Notes | Ref. |
|---|---|---|---|---|
| 1996 | Jerry Maguire | Ray Boyd | | |
| 1998 | Dr. Dolittle | Baby Tiger | Voice role | |
| 1999 | Stuart Little | George Little | | |
| 2000 | The Little Vampire | Tony Thompson | | |
| 2002 | Like Mike | Murph | | |
| 2002 | Stuart Little 2 | George Little | | |
| 2003 | When Zachary Beaver Came to Town | Toby Wilson | | |
| 2005 | The L.A. Riot Spectacular | Tom Saltine Jr. | | |
| 2011 | Shark Pool | Brad | Short film | |
| 2012 | For the Love of Money | Young Yoni | | |
| 2012 | Edge of Salvation | JJ | | |
| 2014 | Awkward Party | Jonathan Flipmicky | Short film | |
| 2014 | Bad Asses | Hammer | Direct-to-video | |
| 2014 | You Used To Be Cute | Himself | Short film | |
| 2014 | Someone I Know | Tommy Matthews | Short film | |
| 2015 | Tag | Rush | | |
| 2016 | Arlo: The Burping Pig | Buster | Voice role | |
| 2016 | Loserville | Franklin Hope | | |
| 2017 | Altitude | Rick | | |
| 2017 | Boone: The Bounty Hunter | Ryan Davenport | | |
| 2017 | Pitching Tents | Scott | | |
| 2017 | Beware The Lake | Mason Clay | | |
| 2017 | Limelight | Rocky | | |
| 2017 | Circus Kane | Scott | | |
| 2017 | Country Thunder | Sam | Short film | |
| 2018 | Andover | Steve | | |
| 2018 | The Delivery | The Doctor | Short film | |
| 2019 | A Second Chance | Cory | | |
| 2020 | Broil | Sydney 'The Chef' Lawson | | |
| 2023 | Ace | Russ | Short film | |
| 2023 | The Re-Education of Molly Singer | Sully the Mascot | | |
| 2024 | Camp Pleasant Lake | Jasper Meadows | | |
| 2024 | Man Goes on Rant | Jonathan | | |
| 2025 | Cottonmouth | Norm | | |
| 2025 | Sarah's Oil | Chemist | | |
| 2026 | Primetime | Crazyfrog73 | | |

=== Television ===
| Year | Title | Role | Notes | Ref. |
|---|---|---|---|---|
| 1996–1997 | The Jeff Foxworthy Show | Justin Foxworthy | Recurring role, 23 episodes | |
| 1997 | Meego | Alex Parker | Main role, 13 episodes | |
| 1997 | The Single Guy | Rudy | Episode: "Big Baby" | |
| 2000 | Dawson's Creek | Buzz Thompson | 3 episodes | |
| 2002 | HBO First Look | Himself | Episode: "On the Set of 'Stuart Little 2" | |
| 2003 | Touched By An Angel | Stan | Episode: "The Good Earth" | |
| 2003 | Saturday Night Live | Himself | Cameo; episode: "Ashton Kutcher/50 Cent" | |
| 2005 | Biography | Himself | Episode: "Child Stars II: Growing Up Hollywood" | |
| 2005 | Family Guy | Wesly | Voice role; episode: "Fast Times at Buddy Cianci Jr. High" | |
| 2006 | Kathy Griffin: My Life on the D-List | Himself | Episode: "Vegas, Baby!" | |
| 2009 | Secret Girlfriend | Himself | Episode: "You Help Sam Have His First Wet Dream" | |
| 2009 | Monk | Rudy Smith | Episode: "Mr. Monk Takes the Stand" | |
| 2009 | Glenn Martin DDS | Himself | Voice role; episode: "Korea Opportunities" | |
| 2013 | Family Tools | Ryan | Episode: "Role Model" | |
| 2013 | Bering Sea Beast | Joe | Television movie | |
| 2018 | Drop the Mic | Himself | Episode: "Danielle Fishel vs. Jonathan Lipnicki / Shania Twain vs. Meghan Trainor" | |
| 2018 | Celebs Go Dating | Himself | Series 4 contestant | |
| 2019 | Worst Cooks in America | Himself | Celebrity Edition contestant | |
| 2025 | The Joe Schmo Show | Himself | Episode: "Ben From Baltimore" | |

== Awards and nominations ==
| Year | Award | Category | Result | Notes |
|---|---|---|---|---|
| 1997 | Young Artist Award | Best Performance in a Feature Film – Actor Age Ten or Under | Won | Jerry Maguire |
| 1997 | Young Star Award | Best Performance by a Young Actor in a Drama Film | Nominated | Jerry Maguire |
| 1998 | Young Star Award | Best Performance by a Young Actor in a Comedy TV Series | Nominated | Meego |
| 2000 | Young Artist Award | Best Performance in a Feature Film – Young Actor Age Nine or Under | Nominated | Stuart Little |
| 2000 | Young Star Award | Best Young Actor/Performance in a Motion Picture Comedy | Won | Stuart Little |
| 2001 | Saturn Award | Best Performance by a Younger Actor | Nominated | The Little Vampire |
| 2001 | Young Artist Award | Best Performance in a Feature Film – Young Actor Age Twelve or Under | Won | The Little Vampire |
