= Jim Doughan =

American actor, teacher and writer

- Born: James Francis Doughan; August 2, 1959 (age 67); Minneapolis, Minnesota, United States
- Education: University of Minnesota Duluth (BFA)
- Occupation: Actor • teacher • writer • producer
- Years active: 1985–2009 (actor); 2009–2022 (teacher)
- Spouse: Kate Benton (m. 1988)

James Francis Doughan (/duːɡən/ DOO-gan) (born August 2, 1959) is an American actor, teacher and writer. He is best known for his roles as Detective Doyle in The Mask (1994) and Detective Allen as well as the voice of Lucky the Cat in Stuart Little (1999) and the head coach for the soccer team Stuart and his human brother, George Little, play for in Stuart Little 2 (2002). He is currently a performing arts teacher at Harvard-Westlake School in Los Angeles, California.

== Career ==
Doughan has been working as a professional actor and writer since 1981 in theatre, film, and television. He was a resident company member for the Dudley Rigg's Brave New Workshop in Minneapolis from 1981 to 1985, and the Los Angeles comedy theater The Groundlings from 1985 to 1993. He has appeared in The Flintstones, The Mask, Stuart Little, Stuart Little 2, The Haunted Mansion, Evan Almighty, and Hotel for Dogs, in addition to guest appearances in several television series. Before becoming a performing arts teacher at Harvard-Westlake School Doughan taught history, English, Drama and PE at the Westridge School in Pasadena, California. He has been a mentor for student writers, and a director for the Harvard-Westlake School Playwright's Workshop. He has also taught at the Harvard-Westlake School Summer Intensive Actor's Workshop and an improvisation master class at the USC Marshall School of Business.

== Education ==
Doughan attended Apple Valley High School in Apple Valley, Minnesota and graduated in 1977. He also attended the University of Minnesota Duluth, where he received his BFA degree in theatre.

== Personal life ==
Doughan married Kate Benton in 1988. Benton is an actress and writer who was also a member of The Groundlings. Benton also works as a teacher at the Harvard-Westlake School.

== Filmography ==
=== Film ===
Year	Title	Role	Notes
1986	Ruthless People	Cop at Sam's House	
1987	In-Self Defense	Role	TV movie
1988	My Stepmother Is An Alien	Party Guest	
1989	Tarzan in Manhattan	Role	TV movie
1994	The Flintstones	Maitre d'	
1994	The Mask	Detective Doyle	
1999	Stuart Little	Detective Allen / Lucky	Voice
2000	The Extreme Adventures of Super Dave	Super Dave's Doctor	Video
2000	The Flintstones in Viva Rock Vegas	Dinosaur Confessor	
2002	Stuart Little 2	The Soccer Coach	
2003	The Haunted Mansion	Mr. Coleman	
2006	Grilled	Andy Wilson	
2007	Evan Almighty	Neighbor	
2009	Hotel for Dogs	Male Reporter	

=== Television ===
Year	Title	Role	Notes
1985	Moonlighting	Man in 223	Episode: "The Lady in the Iron Mask"
1987	Fame	Assistant Director	Episode: "Love Kittens Go To High School"
1987	Night Court	Jason the Pleading Man	Episode: "A Day in the Life"
1987	Throb	Robert	Episode: "Genius"
1987	The Charmings	Salesman	Episode: "The Charming's Buy a Car"
1987	Roomies	Station Manager/Stan	2 Episodes
1988	Webster	Billy	Episode: "The Four Tops: The Sequel"
1988	Newhart	Group Leader	Episode: "The Buck Stops Here"
1988	Frank's Place	Louis	Episode: "Frank's Place - The Movie"
1988	Coming of Age	Tom	Episode: "The Kids are Coming, the Kids are Coming"
1988	The Golden Girls	Ben	Episode: "Yokel Hero"
1989	Thirtysomething	Accountant Fred	Episode: "First Day/Last Day"
1989	On the Television	Various	Episode: "Our Maid Imelda"
1986–89	227	Larry/Rusty	2 Episodes
1989	China Beach	Resident Doctor	Episode: "The World: Part 1"
1990	Empty Nest	Man at Party	Episode: "Goodbye, Mr. Dietz"
1990	The Munsters Today	Bo	Episode: "No More Mr. Nice Guy"
1990	His & Hers	Mr. Buckey	13 Episodes
1991	Family Matters	Jimmy	Episode: "High Hopes"
1991	Who's the Boss	The Amazing Dave	Episode: "Party Politics"
1991	True Colors	Officer Dehling	Episode: "Homies Alone"
1991	Riders in the Sky	Muley	Episode: "Harmony Ranch"
1987–91	Perfect Strangers	Jimmy/Jimmy, the Security Guard	4 Episodes
1993	Sisters	Gordon Wasserman	Episode: "Things Are Tough All Over"
1993	Flying Blind	Minister	Episode: "The Spy Who Came in from the Old"
1993	Coach	Janitor	Episode: "Belly of the Beast"
1995	Platypus Man	Speaker	Episode: "Both Sides Now"
1995	Kirk	Rob	Episode: "Kirk Unplugged"
1995	Night Stand with Dick Dietrick	Ed	Episode: "Sexaholics"
1989–97	Murphy Brown	Janitor/T.D.	2 Episodes
1997	Buffy the Vampire Slayer	Mr. Pole	Episode: "Witch"
1998	Step by Step	Justice Pruett	Episode: "Goin to the Chapel"
1998	Ellen	Camera Assistant	Episode: "Ellen: A Hollywood Tribute: Part 1"
2004	That's So Raven	Professor Benjamin	Episode: "Taken to the Cleaners"
2006	Jake in Progress	Carl	Episode: "Eyebrow Girl vs. Smirkface"
2006–07	The War at Home	Father Conlon	2 Episodes
