= Stuart Little: The Journey Home =

2001 video game

- Developer: Tiertex Design Studios
- Publisher: Activision
- Series: Stuart Little
- Platform: Game Boy Color
- Release: NA: August 23, 2001
- Genres: Platform, racing
- Mode: Single-player

Stuart Little: The Journey Home is a 2001 platform game developed by Tiertex Design Studios and published by Activision for the Game Boy Color, and is a licensed game based upon the 1999 film of the same name.

== Gameplay ==
A screenshot of Stuart Little: The Journey Home.

The Journey Home features two modes of play: 'Story Game', in which the player completes eight levels in consecutive order, and 'Quick Game', in which a player can complete any level. Each level is completely different, with some based upon scenes in the film, and others unique to the game. Levels are split between platform game mechanics, such as exploring a toy town or navigating Central Park, as well as racing game mechanics, including racing a toy car or sailing in a boat race.

== Reception ==
Reception

Review scores
Publication	Score
AllGame	2.5/5
Game Boy Xtreme	7%
Gaming Target	4.0
Total Game Boy	77%

Stuart Little: The Journey Home received mixed reviews. Jem Roberts of Total Game Boy praised the number of ways "the designers have crammed scenes from the film into plenty of exciting levels", whilst acknowledging the lack of longevity, stating "the lack of extras mean this isn't exactly a long-player". Writing for Gaming Target, Ryan Smotherman stated that whilst the game's graphics were "very colorful and the characters animate well", the game lacked difficulty, noting "there still isn't much of a challenge to be found at the harder levels". In contrast, Oliver Lan of Game Boy Xtreme dismissed the game for its "sheer, breathtaking absence of anything approaching gameplay", noting "there doesn't seem to be any enemies at all", and the low energy of racing segments, observing "it's the only racing game I've ever seen where you're encouraged to go as slowly as possible".
