= Stuart Little 2 =

2002 film directed by Rob Minkoff

- Theatrical release poster
- Directed by: Rob Minkoff
- Screenplay by: Bruce Joel Rubin
- Story by: Douglas Wick; Bruce Joel Rubin
- Based on: Stuart Little by E. B. White
- Produced by: Douglas Wick; Lucy Fisher
- Starring: Geena Davis; Hugh Laurie; Jonathan Lipnicki
- Cinematography: Steven Poster
- Edited by: Priscilla Nedd-Friendly
- Music by: Alan Silvestri
- Production companies: Columbia Pictures; Red Wagon Entertainment; Franklin/Waterman Productions
- Distributed by: Sony Pictures Releasing
- Release dates: July 14, 2002 (Westwood); July 19, 2002 (United States)
- Running time: 78 minutes
- Country: United States
- Language: English
- Budget: $120 million
- Box office: $170 million

Stuart Little 2 is a 2002 American live-action/animated comedy film loosely based on E.B. White's novel Stuart Little. It was directed by Rob Minkoff and produced by Douglas Wick and Lucy Fisher, from a screenplay by Bruce Joel Rubin, and a story by Rubin and Wick. The film stars Geena Davis, Hugh Laurie, and Jonathan Lipnicki, alongside the voices of Michael J. Fox, Melanie Griffith, Nathan Lane, James Woods, and Steve Zahn. It is the sequel to the 1999 film Stuart Little and the second installment in the Stuart Little trilogy. In the film, Stuart (Fox) and Snowbell (Lane) meet a canary named Margalo (Griffith) before she is captured by Falcon (Woods), and Stuart and Snowbell must team up to find her and defeat Falcon.

Stuart Little 2 premiered in Westwood on July 14, 2002, and was released in theaters in the United States on July 19, by Sony Pictures Releasing through its Columbia Pictures label. The film received positive reviews from critics, but grossed just $170 million against a $120 million budget, considerably less than its predecessor. It was followed by a third film, a direct-to-video sequel titled Stuart Little 3: Call of the Wild in 2006.

== Plot ==
Three years after being adopted by the Littles and defeating Smokey, (Note: As depicted in Stuart Little (1999).) Stuart Little has settled into family life with his parents, older brother George, and baby sister Martha, who has yet to say her first words. Stuart is becoming tired of his adoptive mother Eleanor's overprotectiveness due to his small size, and is finding himself lonely when George would rather play with his own friend, Will. When playing by himself, Stuart accidentally wrecks George's toy plane while trying to fix it, prompting George to furiously throw it into a trash can at Eleanor's request due to it being much too dangerous. Stuart is upset about the situation, but his adoptive father Frederick tells him there is a "silver lining" to every hard situation, and encourages him to find a new friend of his own.

When driving home from school in his roadster, Stuart meets Margalo, a canary who falls into his car. Margalo states she has injured her wing being chased by a predatory Falcon, and Stuart takes her home to recover. Unbeknownst to the Littles, Margalo is in fact physically healthy, and is working for Falcon to steal precious items from households. However, she soon bonds with the Littles, and feels immense guilt over what she is planning to do.

Falcon threatens Stuart's life if she does not complete their plan. Margalo steals Eleanor's ring, prompting Stuart to venture down the Littles' kitchen drain attached to a string holding a hook in an unfruitful attempt to find it again. He soon finds himself in trouble (because the string that is holding him breaks), but Margalo rescues him; realizing the danger she is putting him in, she leaves the next morning. Stuart becomes convinced that Falcon has kidnapped her, and sets off to find her with Snowbell, the family cat, while George conducts a series of lies to their parents to explain Stuart's absence.

To find Falcon, Stuart and Snowbell seek out Monty, who tells them that Falcon lives at the top of the Pishkin Building, and warns that he is extremely dangerous. Stuart uses a balloon to fly to the top of the building where he finds Falcon and Margalo. Falcon reveals the truth about Margalo and Eleanor's ring which shocks Stuart, but Margalo insists that their friendship was genuine. Stuart asks her to prove it by leaving with him, angering Falcon. Falcon then drops Stuart off the building and traps Margalo in an empty paint can. Stuart however lands in a garbage truck and is taken to a garbage barge out at sea. Initially devastated, Stuart soon finds his silver lining by rediscovering and repairing George's broken toy plane, which he uses to fly back to land. Meanwhile, George is reprimanded by his parents for his deception - in which he told them that Stuart had been staying at Will's house to rehearse as part of a play only to be exposed by Will's mother who was unaware - and interrogated on Stuart's true whereabouts. George reveals where Stuart is, prompting the family to head out and look for him.

Back at the Pishkin Building, Snowbell makes his way to the top and frees Margalo from the paint can, only to become trapped in it himself. Margalo ends her allegiance with Falcon, and flies away with Eleanor's ring, prompting Falcon to give chase. Stuart arrives in his toy plane, and a furious chase occurs through Manhattan, with the Littles and Snowbell following from behind. Stuart ultimately wins the battle by using the ring to blind Falcon's vision, before jumping out from the plane and allowing it to crash into Falcon as he falls into a trash can and is presumably eaten by Monty. The day saved, Frederick and Eleanor forgive Stuart for running away, George for lying to them, and Margalo for taking the ring, telling them they are extremely proud of them for their bravery. Later, Margalo fulfills her dream of flying south for the winter, planning on returning to the Little household in the spring. Martha stuns everyone by using her first words, "Bye, bye, birdie." to say goodbye to Margalo.

== Cast ==
=== Voice cast ===
- Michael J. Fox as Stuart Little, a young anthropomorphic mouse adopted as part of the Little family.
- Melanie Griffith as Margalo, a young anthropomorphic yellow canary whom Stuart meets on his way home from school and becomes his love interest, though it is revealed that she is actually in cahoots with Falcon.
- James Woods as Falcon, a peregrine falcon who served as Margalo's master as well as being the main antagonist.
- Nathan Lane as Snowbell, the family's Persian cat who is Stuart's best friend.
- Steve Zahn as Monty, a gray tabby cat who is Snowbell's best friend.

=== Live-action cast ===
- Geena Davis as Mrs. Eleanor Little, the matriarch of the Little family and Frederick's wife.
- Hugh Laurie as Mr. Frederick Little, the patriarch of the Little family and Eleanor's husband.
- Jonathan Lipnicki as George Little, the eldest son of the Little family and Stuart's older brother.
- Anna and Ashley Hoelck as Martha Little, the infant daughter of the Little family and Stuart and George's younger sister.
- Marc John Jefferies as Will Powell, George's loyal best friend.
- Jim Doughan as Stuart and George's soccer coach. Doughan previously voiced Lucky and played the role of Detective Allen in Stuart Little.
- Brad Garrett as Rob, a plumber called to find Eleanor's ring in the kitchen sink's pipes.
- Amelia Marshall as Rita Powell, Will's mother.
- Ronobir Lahiri as the unnamed Indian-American taxi driver
- Maria Bamford as Stuart and George's teacher
- Angelo Massagli as Wallace, one of Stuart and George's soccer teammates.
- Kevin Olson as Irwin, another of Stuart and George's soccer teammates.

== Production ==
On February 15, 2001, it was confirmed that Rob Minkoff would return as director. It was also confirmed that the original cast, including Geena Davis, Hugh Laurie, Jonathan Lipnicki, Michael J. Fox, Nathan Lane and Steve Zahn, would reprise their roles in the film.

Principal photography began on March 5, 2001, and wrapped in June of that year.

Following the September 11 terrorist attacks, parts of the Twin Towers soon ended up digitally removed and a number of scenes were re-shot. However, World Trade Center Building 7 still appears in some parts of the film.

== Reception ==
=== Box office ===
The film had an opening weekend gross of $15.1 million, ranking in second place narrowly behind Road to Perdition. The domestic total was $65 million and the worldwide total was $170 million against an estimated production budget of $120 million, less than its predecessor.

=== Critical reception ===
On review aggregator Rotten Tomatoes, the film holds an approval rating of 81% based on 124 reviews, with an average score of 6.90/10. The critical consensus reads, "Stuart Little 2 is a sweet, visually impressive sequel that provides wholesome entertainment for kids." On Metacritic, the film has a weighted average score of 66 out of 100 based on 29 reviews, indicating "generally favorable reviews". Audiences surveyed by CinemaScore gave the film an average grade of "A" on an A+ to F scale.

Ann Hornaday wrote a positive review in The Washington Post, noting how the film's idealized setting makes it family-friendly. Hornaday praised the vocal performances of Fox, Griffith, and Woods in their roles as Stuart, Margalo, and Falcon, respectively, as well as the characters' computer animation: "The animated characters engage in such natural movements and, more important, exude such subtle emotional expression that they mesh seamlessly with their live-action counterparts." Tom Shen of the Chicago Reader, described the film as "fairly formulaic", but praised its jokes as "hilarious", especially those coming from the character of Snowbell, the Littles' cat.

== Soundtrack ==
The soundtrack, Music from and Inspired by Stuart Little 2, was released by Epic Records and Sony Music Soundtrax on July 16, 2002, on Audio CD and Compact Cassette. The tracks in bold do not appear on the film and the final two tracks are score cues composed by Alan Silvestri.

Another album features the entirety of Silvestri's orchestral score for the film.

No.	Title	Writer(s)	Producer(s)	Length
1.	"I'm Alive" (Celine Dion)	Kristian Lundin, Andreas Carlsson	Kristian Lundin	3:28
2.	"Put a Little Love in Your Heart" (Mary Mary)	Jackie DeShannon, Jimmy Holiday, Randy Myers	VME	3:09
3.	"Top of the World" (Mandy Moore)	Jeff Cohen, Leah Haywood		3:22
4.	"Another Small Adventure" (Chantal Kreviazuk)	Chantal Kreviazuk, Raine Maida		2:57
5.	"One" (Nathan Lane as Snowbell)	Harry Nilsson	Rick Jarrard	2:18
6.	"**What I Like About You**" (**The Romantics**)	**Wally Palmar, Mike Skill, Jimmy Marinos**	**Pete Solley**	**2:56**
7.	"Hold on to the Good Things" (Shawn Colvin)	Roxanne Seeman, Holly Knight		3:30
8.	"**Count on Me**" (**Billy Gilman**)	**Andy Marvel**		**3:42**
9.	"**Smile**" (**Vitamin C**)	**Josh Deutsch, Colleen Fitzpatrick**	**Josh Deutsch, Garry Hughes**	**3:58**
10.	"Alone Again (Naturally)" (Gilbert O'Sullivan)	Gilbert O'Sullivan	Gilbert O'Sullivan	3:38
11.	"**Born to Be Wild**" (**Steppenwolf**)	**Mars Bonfire**	**Gabriel Mekler**	**3:30**
12.	"**Little Angel of Mine**" (**No Secrets**)	**Orrin Hatch** **Madeline Stone**		**3:47**
13.	"Falcon Finito" (Alan Silvestri)	Alan Silvestri	Alan Silvestri	6:51
14.	"Silver Lining" (Alan Silvestri)	Alan Silvestri	Alan Silvestri	4:21
Total length:				51:27

== Video game ==
Reception

Aggregate score
Aggregator	Score
Metacritic	GBA: 59/100; PS1: 62/100

Review scores
Publication	Score
AllGame	GBA: PC: PS1:
GameSpot	PS1: 5.3/10
GameZone	GBA: 6.9/10; PS1: 6.5/10
IGN	GBA: 5/10; PS1: 7/10
Jeuxvideo.com	PC: 5/20
Nintendo World Report	GBA: 6/10
Official Nintendo Magazine	GBA: 6/10
PlayStation Official Magazine – Australia	PS1: 5/10

Three different video games based on the film were released. One was developed by Magenta Software and published by Sony Computer Entertainment for the PlayStation. A second game was developed by Creations and published by Activision for the Game Boy Advance. A third was developed by Hyperspace Cowgirls and published by Infogrames for Microsoft Windows.

== Accolades ==
Year	Awards	Category	Nominee	Result
2002	BAFTA Children's Award	Best Feature Film	Douglas Wick; Lucy Fisher; Rob Minkoff; Bruce Joel Rubin	Nominated
2003	Golden Trailer Award	Best Animation/Family Film	Stuart Little 2	Nominated
2003	Visual Effects Society Award	Best Character Animation in an Animated Motion Picture	Tony Bancroft; David Schaub; Eric Armstrong; Sean Mullen	Won
2003	Visual Effects Society Award	Best Visual Effects Photography in a Motion Picture	Earl Wiggins; Mark Vargo; Tom Houghton; Anna Foerster	Nominated
2003	Young Artist Award	Best Family Feature Film	Rob Minkoff	Nominated

== Home media ==
Stuart Little 2 was released in the United States on VHS and DVD on December 10, 2002, by Columbia TriStar Home Entertainment, and in the United Kingdom on November 25, 2002. In 2008, the film was re-released as part of a double feature with Stuart Little. Stuart Little and Stuart Little 2 were released in a combo on Sony PSP's UMD format on January 3, 2006. A Blu-ray/DVD combo pack was released on June 28, 2011, alongside the first film, by Sony Pictures Home Entertainment.
