= Stuart Little (TV series) =

- Genre: Family
- Based on: Stuart Little by E. B. White
- Voices of: David Kaufman; Hugh Laurie; Myles Jeffrey; Quinton Flynn; Jennifer Hale; André Sogliuzzo
- Opening theme: Stuart Little theme by Alan Silvestri
- Composers: Kevin Kiner; Van Dyke Parks
- Country of origin: United States
- Original language: English
- No. of seasons: 1
- No. of episodes: 13

Production
- Executive producers: Douglas Wick; Lucy Fisher
- Production location: New York City
- Running time: 23 minutes
- Production companies: Adelaide Productions; Red Wagon Entertainment; Sony Pictures Television

Original release
- Network: HBO Family
- Release: March 1 – May 24, 2003

Stuart Little, also known as Stuart Little: The Animated Series, is an American animated television series, loosely based on the 1945 E. B. White children's book Stuart Little, as well as the live-action/animated film adaptations. It was produced by Red Wagon Entertainment and Sony Pictures Television for the HBO Family digital cable television channel and aired for one season of 13 episodes.

== Premise ==
Taking place after the events of the first two films, the series focuses on the adventures of Stuart Little, a mouse adopted by a human family. Stuart is bold, imaginative, and adventurous and he sees everyday objects as huge props. Although most of the series was traditionally animated, each episode began and ended with a CGI animated segment featuring Stuart, who would recount an event that would open and end in every episode. The series teaches children about problem solving and how to feel satisfied for their accomplishments.

== Voice cast ==
- David Kaufman as Stuart Little, a young anthropomorphic mouse adopted as part of the Little family.
- Quinton Flynn and Kevin Schon as Snowbell, the family's Persian cat who is Stuart's best friend.
- Myles Jeffrey as George Little, the 11-year-old eldest son of the Little family and Stuart's older brother.
- Hugh Laurie as Mr. Frederick Little, the patriarch of the Little family and Mrs. Little's husband.
- Jennifer Hale as
  - Mrs. Eleanor Little, the matriarch of the Little family and Mr. Little's wife.
  - Martha Little, the 3-year-old infant daughter of the Little family and Stuart and George's younger sister.
- André Sogliuzzo as Monty, a gray tabby cat who is Snowbell's best friend.
- Rachael Harris as Margalo, a young anthropomorphic yellow canary who is Stuart's love interest.
- Pat Fraley as Falcon, a peregrine falcon who is Stuart's nemesis.
- Jeffrey Jones as Uncle Crenshaw Little, the older brother of Mr. Little.
- Marc John Jefferies as Will Powell, George's loyal best friend.

With the exceptions of Laurie, Jones, and Jefferies, none of the actors from the films reprised their roles. Daniel Hansen who previously portrayed an unnamed student in Stuart Little 2 voices Larry Gronk.

== Episodes ==
| No. | Title | Directed by | Written by | Storyboard by | Original release date | Prod. code |
|---|---|---|---|---|---|---|
| 1 | "The Meatloaf Bandit" | Bob Hathcock | Melody Fox | Anna Burns, Anthony Chun, Jack Hsu, and Rafael Rosado | March 1, 2003 | 01 |
Meat loaves have been disappearing all over town lately. Stuart and George think that a "Meatloaf Bandit" is on the loose. They buy a dog to help protect their house and they set up traps.
| 2 | "A Model Driver" | Bert Ring | Carin Greenberg Baker | Jeff Allen, Bryan Baugh, Nathan Chew, Michael Swanigan, and Joe Vaux | March 8, 2003 | 02 |
Mr. and Mrs. Little think they make a complex with George because they let Stuart do all kinds of fun stuff, but not George. Thus, George builds a car that he can fit in so he can ride it just like how Stuart can with his cars.
| 3 | "Team Little" | Rich Wilkie | Amy Wolfram | Nathan Chew, Bert Ring, Kuni Tomita, and Joe Vaux | March 15, 2003 | 03 |
Stuart and George sign up their family for a school picnic. When they get there, they meet a family who Stuart and George accuses of cheating in games. They try to have fun, but do not because they keep on losing.
| 4 | "He Said, He Said" | Chuck Klein | Cliff MacGillivray | Ron Campbell, Jennifer Graves, and Rafael Rosado | March 22, 2003 | 04 |
When Stuart crashes the car in a race, George thinks his friend Will sabotaged it.
| 5 | "The Great Outdoors" | Rich Wilkie | Amy Wolfram | Jack Hsu, Rafael Rosado, and Kuni Tomita | March 29, 2003 | 05 |
The Little family go on a camping trip. While they are there, two raccoons learn that they have food so they sneak into their backpacks and take all of their hiking equipment. It is now up to Stuart and George to find the way back to camp so they can go home.
| 6 | "Life, Liberty and the Pursuit of Taco Tuesday" | Rich Wilkie | Kevin Hopps | Anna Burns, Jack Hsu, Rafael Rosado, and Kuni Tomita | April 5, 2003 | 06 |
After Taco Tuesday is replaced with unpopular fish sticks, George gives Stuart the idea to run for class president. To earn votes, he bakes cookies and passes out fliers. Stuart cleans up the school playground and makes the mascot better. He also makes a petition to get Taco Tuesday back instead of having to eat fish sticks.
| 7 | "A Little Big Record" | Chuck Klein | Greg Pincus | Ron Campbell, Wendy Grieb, Kyle Menke, and Joe Vaux | April 12, 2003 | 07 |
During a rainy day, Stuart and George are bored and decide to read a book called Big Bob's Big Book of World Records. They try to get featured in the book but discover that it is actually more difficult than George and Stuart had thought it would be.
| 8 | "Skateboard Dogz" | Rich Wilkie | Melody Fox | Anna Burns, Jach Hsu, Carson Kugler, Art Mawhinney, and Marty Warner | April 19, 2003 | 13 |
Stuart and George become obsessed with skateboarding and join a skate group. All of the skateboarding gets them behind in their schoolwork. The whole group enters a skate contest and have a chance to have their picture on a skate magazine.
| 9 | "Adventures in Housekeeping" | Rich Wilkie | Rob Hoegee | Jeff Allen, Anna Burns, Rafael Rosado, and Marty Warner | April 26, 2003 | 12 |
When Mrs. Little gets sick, it falls on George and Stuart to help Mr. Little with the housework.
| 10 | "A Little Too Fast" | Chuck Klein | David Slack | Eric Fredrickson, Llyn Hunter, and Kyle Menke | May 3, 2003 | 10 |
The Little family go to the county fair. Stuart and George want to go on every ride before they have to go home. This means they have to do everything extra fast which can take out some of the fun. However, trying to go on all the rides as fast as possible makes them tired.
| 11 | "No Job is Too Little" | Chuck Klein | Melody Fox | Zeus Cervas, Llyn Hunter, Carson Kugler, Joe Vaux, and Bert Ring | May 10, 2003 | 11 |
Stuart and George try to find odd jobs to earn enough money to buy Mrs. Little a birthday gift.
| 12 | "A Little Bit Country" | Rich Wilkie | Brian Kaplan | Art Mawhinney, Rafael Rosado, Kuni Tomita, and Joe Vaux | May 17, 2003 | 09 |
While visiting their Uncle Crenshaw on his new farm, Stuart and Snowbell encounter Stuart's nemesis, Falcon.
| 13 | "A Little Vacation" | Bert Ring | Mark Waxman | Nathan Chew, Jennifer Graves, Eric Fredrickson, and Llyn Hunter | May 24, 2003 | 08 |
The Little family goes on a vacation and stays at a hotel where they are supposed to meet with Uncle Crenshaw. Stuart and George fear that the hotel is haunted.

== Home media ==
Two DVDs were released on May 22, 2007. Each contained 3 episodes of Stuart Little. In April 2009, two more DVDs were released. The Complete Series was released on DVD in Region 2 to the UK on 25 February 2008.

DVD releases
| Name | Release date | Number of episodes |
|---|---|---|
| All Revved Up! | May 22, 2007 | 3 |
| Fun Around Every Curve! | May 22, 2007 | 3 |
| Stuart Little The Complete Animated Series | 25 February 2008 | 13 |
| A Little Family Fun! | April 21, 2009 | 3 |
| Going for the Gold! | April 21, 2009 | 4 |
