= Stuart Little 3: Call of the Wild =

2005 animated film directed by Audu Paden

- Promotional poster
- Directed by: Audu Paden
- Screenplay by: Bob Shaw; Don McEnery
- Story by: Douglas Wick
- Based on: Characters by E. B. White
- Produced by: Douglas Wick; Lucy Fisher; Leslie Hough
- Starring: Michael J. Fox; Geena Davis; Hugh Laurie; Wayne Brady; Kevin Schon; Corey Padnos; Virginia Madsen; Peter MacNicol; Rino Romano
- Edited by: Robert Gordon; Bruce King
- Music by: Atli Örvarsson
- Production companies: Sony Pictures Home Entertainment; Red Wagon Entertainment; Mainframe Entertainment
- Distributed by: Sony Pictures Home Entertainment
- Release dates: October 11, 2005 (Brazil); February 21, 2006 (U.S.)
- Running time: 75 minutes
- Countries: United States; Canada
- Language: English

Stuart Little 3: Call of the Wild is a 2005 animated adventure comedy film directed by Audu Paden, distributed by Sony Pictures Home Entertainment. It was released in Brazil on October 11, 2005, and on DVD and VHS in the United States on February 21, 2006. It is the third and final installment in the Stuart Little trilogy.

In the film, Stuart and his family spend their summer vacation in a cabin near Lake Garland. During the vacation, Stuart befriends a smooth-talking anthropomorphic skunk named Reeko, and a mysterious beast takes the family cat Snowbell, prompting Stuart's mission to save him. Michael J. Fox, Geena Davis and Hugh Laurie reprise their roles as Stuart Little, Eleanor Little and Frederick Little, while Snowbell, George and Monty are now voiced by Kevin Schon, Corey Padnos and Rino Romano (replacing Nathan Lane, Jonathan Lipnicki and Steve Zahn who previously portrayed and voiced them in the live-action films).

Unlike its predecessors, Stuart Little 3: Call of the Wild was given a direct to video release, and was fully made with computer animation rather than in live action. Upon release, the film received generally negative reviews.

== Plot ==
Stuart and his family leave the comfort of Manhattan to go on a camping trip near Lake Garland. When they get there, Stuart and George meet a fellow Lake Scout named Brooke who warns them of a cougar who lives near the lake called "The Beast". The two subsequently decide to join the Lake Scouts.

George excels at scouting while also developing a crush on Brooke, but Stuart has trouble keeping up due to his small stature. One day while hiking with the Scouts, Stuart accidentally gets left behind. While trying to find them, Stuart meets Reeko, a skunk who is generally disliked by the forest animals and is on a mission to give food to The Beast. Down on his luck with the Scouts and Troopmaster Bickle looking down upon him, Stuart makes a deal with Reeko for him to learn the ways of the forest.

After some training and being invited to dinner with Stuart's family, Reeko ultimately befriends Stuart. However, after deciding the food given to him is not enough, Reeko tricks Snowbell into entering the forest and gets captured by The Beast. Soon after finding out Reeko was behind Snowbell's disappearance, Stuart goes off into the wilderness to save Snowbell.

Not long after, Eleanor finds out Stuart is missing and rallies a search party with Frederick and the scouts. Meanwhile, Stuart successfully rescues Snowbell and attempts to trick The Beast into falling into a trap covered with sticks and leaves. Upon noticing the trap failing and before Stuart is eaten, Reeko shows up with a group of forest animals who initially did not like him; the forest animals help out Stuart and Reeko. They are found by the search party, while The Beast is defeated and then taken away to a zoo by the humans, and Stuart earns a gold kerchief from Troopmaster Bickle. As Stuart's family is packing up to leave, Reeko apologizes for his behavior and tells Stuart that he was wrong to betray him. Stuart says farewell to Reeko and the Littles head back home to Manhattan.

== Voice cast ==
- Michael J. Fox as Stuart Little, a young white anthropomorphic mouse adopted as part of the Little family
- Wayne Brady as Reeko, an anthropomorphic skunk
- Kevin Schon as Snowbell, the family's Persian cat who is Stuart's best friend
- Geena Davis as Mrs. Eleanor Little, the matriarch of the Little family and Frederick's wife
- Hugh Laurie as Mr. Frederick Little, the patriarch of the Little family and Eleanor's husband
- Corey Padnos as George Little, the eldest son of the Little family and Stuart's older brother
- Virginia Madsen as the Beast, a female cougar and Reeko's master
- Rino Romano as Monty, a gray tabby cat who is Snowbell's best friend
- Peter MacNicol as Troopmaster Bickle, the leader of the Lake Scouts
- Tara Strong as Brooke, an experienced Lake Scout at Lake Garland
- Charlie Adler as Beaver, one of the forest animals of Lake Garland
- Kath Soucie as Cottontail, a rabbit and one of the forest animals of Lake Garland

Martha Little (Stuart and George's younger sister) appears in the film, but her voice actress is unknown. Additional voices include Garry Chalk, Tom Kenny, Sophia Paden, Kath Soucie and Tara Strong.

== Reception ==
James Plath of Reels.com rated it 2.5 out of 4, saying "Kids will still like it because the storyline is engaging, the color palette is bright and cheery, the songs are upbeat and pleasant enough, and the messages about good behavior, perseverance, and belonging are worthwhile."

Themoviescene.co.uk rated the film 2/5 stars and said: "What this all boils down to is that Stuart Little 3: Call of the Wild is in truth a touch disappointing as it lacks much of what made the first two movies work for almost a whole family."

Sloan Freer of Radiotimes.com rated it 2 out of 5, saying, "The quality plunges drastically in this uninspired direct-to-video sequel. Gone is the charming mix of live action and CGI used in the original two films, replaced by full animation whose flatness and simplicity is symbolic of the entire tale. Surprisingly, the core voice talent remains the same with Michael J Fox, Geena Davis, and Hugh Laurie wasting their efforts on a weak plot that sees boy mouse Stuart demonstrate his bravery when Snowbell the family cat is kidnapped during the Little clan's lakeside vacation. Undemanding humour, a sprinkling of mild peril, and the obligatory life lessons offer enough substance to keep the very young happy, but only the short running time will impress anyone older."

Bob Hoose of PluggedIn.com said "Those who did grow to love the films Stuart Little and Stuart Little 2 will find a number of noticeable changes with this third installment. It's fully animated, for one thing, instead of using the franchise's established combination of live action and animation. And the target audience seems to be narrowed to kids somewhere around the age of 7. But while the adventure isn't as large and the songs aren't so singable, Stuart's still the little guy with the big heart. He's still got the charm, the determination and the spunk. He still helps us see that with a loving family and the help of our friends we can persevere, despite the odds."

== Home media ==
Stuart Little 3: Call of the Wild was released for DVD and VHS on February 21, 2006. The film grossed $11.7 million in DVD sales in the United States. It was the last VHS by Sony Pictures Home Entertainment until the limited release of Alien: Romulus 18 years later.

The DVD included a number of special features. This included memory games "Help Stuart Escape!" and "Monty's Monstrous Appetite", as well as "Stuart's Summer Journal", a recap of the film's events in a journal format. Also included was "Learn to Draw", which had step by step guides to drawing characters from the movie, and a trailer for the PlayStation 2 game Stuart Little 3: Big Photo Adventure.
