= Gavin Watson Site =

- U.S. National Register of Historic Places
- Nearest city: Sullivan, Maine
- Area: 1 acre (0.40 ha)
- NRHP reference No.: 87000415
- Added to NRHP: March 18, 1987

The Gavin Watson Site, designated Site 59.8 by the Maine Archaeological Survey, is a prehistoric archaeological site in Sullivan, Maine. Located on the shore of Flanders Bay, an inlet off Frenchman Bay in Down East Maine, the site is a refuse midden that is (unusually for the region) free of shells. An important regional multicomponent site with artifacts spanning thousands of years, it was listed on the National Register of Historic Places in 1987.

== Description ==
The site is located on the seacoast of Eastern Maine. Its principal feature is a midden consisting of a rich black organic layer about 37 centimetres (15 in) thick, overlaying a clay subsoil. Relatively small portions nearest the shore were reported to be slightly eroded in 1987, but much of the site is believed to be intact.

The site was first test by archaeologists from the University of Maine at Orono in 1973, at some materials were found. A return visit was made in 1975, at which time tools of stone and bone, pottery fragments, and remains of toolmaking (debitage) were recovered. The site underwent a significant excavation in 1978, led by a local school teacher, whose collection is now in the Robert Abbe Museum of Stone Antiquities in Bar Harbor. Among the thousands of objects recovered from the site there are stone and bone tools, pottery fragments, and projectile points. The site resembles the Goddard Site in Brooklin as a multi-component site, and offers the potential to reveal a great deal about human occupation of the area over a significant time period.

The site is significant regionally as a particularly fine multicomponent site, including the early Moorehead phase (also known as the Red Paint People, c. 4000 BC), the subsequent Susquehanna Tradition, and the Early to Late Ceramic periods (extending from about 2500 BC to 500 CE). The site is also well-preserved, and was only 20% excavated at the time of its National Register listing.

== See also ==
- National Register of Historic Places listings in Hancock County, Maine
