= A Subtreasury of American Humor =

First edition (publ. Coward McCann)

A Subtreasury of American Humor is a 1941 anthology edited by E. B. White and Katharine White, of then-contemporary United States humor writers. Both editors were long-time contributors of The New Yorker, and the collection has been sometimes termed as "the New Yorker school of American Humor." Kurt Vonnegut said in 1976 that "an awful lot" of his work is rooted in this single book.

Following the success of the book, the following year Morris Bishop published A Treasury of British Humor.
