= Flye Point 2 =

- U.S. National Register of Historic Places
- Nearest city: Brooklin, Maine
- Area: 0.8 acres (0.32 ha)
- NRHP reference No.: 85000842
- Added to NRHP: April 15, 1985

Flye Point 2, also designated Site 42.43 by the Maine Archaeological Survey, is a prehistoric archaeological site in Brooklin, Maine. This site includes a large shell midden, and has yielded evidence of human habitation, including "pit house" features, with an estimated occupation time of 1000 CE. The midden is one of the largest of its type on the coast of eastern Maine. It was listed on the National Register of Historic Places in 1985.

== Description and history ==
Flye Point is located on the east side of Brooklin, jutting into Blue Hill Bay to the north of Naskeag Point, where the more well-known Goddard Site is located. This site's principal feature is a large shell midden, with a length of 170 metres (560 ft) at the time of its National Register listing. The site is subject to tidal erosion, and it was estimated at that time to already have lost about half of its original material. Shell deposits in the midden are about 40 centimetres (16 in) thick, with crushed shells near the top and whole shells at the bottom.

The site was excavated in 1983 by Dr. Steven Cox. Twenty-nine one-meter squares were excavated, leading to the discovery of an occupation level, dated to the Late Ceramic period. Faunal remains found at the site suggest that it was used for year-round occupation. In conjunction with the Goddard Site, it is considered a key site in understanding habitation patterns during the Late Ceramic period. It is further possible that even older artifacts may be found.

== See also ==
- National Register of Historic Places listings in Hancock County, Maine
