= Beth Eden =

Beth Eden may refer to:

- Beth-Eden, a heritage-listed house in Graceville, Queensland, Australia
- Beth Eden Chapel in Brooklin, Maine, United States
- Bit Adini, an Aramaean state that existed as an independent kingdom during the 10th and 9th Centuries BC

== See also ==
- Beth Eden Baptist Church (disambiguation)
