= Ruth Reinke Whitney =

American magazine editor (1928–1999)

Ruth Whitney
- Born: Ruth Reinke Whitney; July 23, 1928; Oshkosh, Wisconsin, United States
- Died: June 4, 1999 (aged 70); Irvington, New York, United States
- Education: Oshkosh High School
- Alma mater: Northwestern University
- Occupation: Magazine editor
- Years active: 1949–1998
- Employers: Time Inc. (1949–1952); Condé Nast (1967–1998)
- Title: Glamour editor-in-chief
- Term: January 1967 – October 1998
- Predecessor: Kathleen Aston Casey
- Successor: Bonnie Fuller
- Spouse: Daniel Whitney (m. 1949; died 1995)
- Children: 1

Ruth Reinke Whitney (July 23, 1928 – June 4, 1999) was an American magazine editor who was editor-of-chief of Glamour from 1967 to 1998. She began her career as a copywriter in the educational department of Time Inc. from 1949 to 1952. After Whitney was fired in part for supporting Adlai Stevenson II during the 1952 United States presidential election, she was made chief copy editor of homemakers magazine Better Living in 1954, and was made its editor-in-chief two years later. Between 1956 and 1967, she worked as associated editor and later executive director of Seventeen magazine.

In the 31 years she was editor of Glamour magazine, Whitney oversaw an increase in readership and advertising revenue, and introduced new features and columns to it. She also put a black model on its front page in 1968, making Glamour the first American mainstream magazine to put an African American on its front cover. Whitney was president of the American Society of Magazine Editors between 1975 and 1977, and was inducted into its Editor's Hall of Fame in 1997.

== Early life ==
Whitney was born on July 23, 1928, in Oshkosh, Wisconsin. She was the third and youngest child of gravestone and mausoleum designer Leonard G. Reinke, and his wife, Helen Diestler Reinke, a homemaker. Whitney grew up in a bungalow in the city, and was taught at Oshkosh High School. Her teachers were complimentary about her writing, and encouraged her to enter her work into national competitions, earning her a duo of honorable accolades for two of her editorials. She also wrote for the school newspapers The Arrow and The Index. After graduating in 1945, Whitney won a four-year full-tuition scholarship to study at Northwestern University in Evanston, Illinois, graduating with a Bachelor of Arts degree in English with honours in June 1949.

== Career ==
After relocating from Evanston, Illinois to New York City, in 1949, she obtained her first job, working as a copywriter in the educational department at Time Inc, when the company moved their offices to New York. In 1952, Whitney was fired, in part for supporting Adlai Stevenson II during the 1952 United States presidential election whereas others at her workplace supported Dwight D. Eisenhower, making her disenchanted and less willing to work. She discovered she could find work at Newsweek and Fortune among other publications; she said later in life that this was because "she had a uterus", and sought employment on women's magazines.

Whitney took up work as chief copy editor of homemakers magazine Better Living in 1954. Two years later, she was named the magazine's editor-in-chief at age 27. After Better Living ceased publication in 1956, Whitney was appointed associate editor of Seventeen. She was promoted to executive director of Seventeen in 1962, serving in the post until 1967. In January 1967, Samuel Irving Newhouse Jr., chairman of media company Condé Nast, employed Whitney as editor-of-chief of Glamour. She oversaw an increase in advertising revenue from $11.7 million per year to $137.3 million, and was responsible for raising Glamour's readership by almost one million (or 54 per cent) to 2.3 million. Whitney read reader's letters as well as authorizing public surveys to get opinions on topics such as contraceptives, inter-racial dating, the Vietnam War, infertility, and date rape. She also oversaw the magazine win various awards from organisations such as the National Magazine Awards.

In 1968, she successfully convinced Condé Nast to feature Newfoundland black college student Kiti Kironde II on Glamour's front cover that August, making the magazine the first mainstream one in the United States to put an African American on its front cover. Whitney also put another black model on the cover, and repeated this for at least the following two years thereafter. Throughout the 1970s, she introduced multiple how-to-do guides authored by specialists to recognize the changing needs of college students and working women, and new columns on health, home economics, love, and sex. In the 1980s, Whitney oversaw the introduction of Washington Report to inform women about legislative issues affecting them and new congressional women. She also added the regular feature New Tech to help women become more acquainted with computers.

A five-year national survey on family, money, sex and work published in January 1987 was the catalyst for her to publish more columns and featured articles, such as The New Racism: Don’t Deny, Ignore, or Accept It addressing resurgent racism in September 1987. Whitney devoted 24 pages of the January 1990 issue to Men and Romance, yet the lead article was The Sexually Confidant Woman to retain Glamour's tradition to maintain a balanced points of view. In late 1991, she introduced the Truth in Fashion column, taking an investigative approach to the fashion industry. In September 1997, Condé Nast president Steven Florio assured Whitney she would be allowed to retire when she was ready. But on August 17, 1998, Newhouse suggested to Whitney it was the right time for her to retire, and informed her he had employed former Cosmopolitan editor Bonnie Fuller to fill her former position. Her final day as Glamour's editor-of-chief was October 5, 1998, and she admitted to being disappointed that Newhouse did not consult her about being replaced and publicly felt Fuller was not the best selection. Whitney serving 31 years as editor-in-chief of Glamour was the longest tenure for the editor of a major women's magazine in the 20th century.

Between 1975 and 1977, Whitney was president of the American Society of Magazine Editors (ASME). She continued to serve as ASME's executive committee from 1989 to 1992. Whitney was a feminist and served as member of the National Organization for Women (NOW) Legal Defense Fund, causing her to encourage features focusing on women in less traditional careers such as engineers, lawyers, and sportswriters in the 1970s. In 1980, Whitney earned the Matrix Award from Women in Communication, and in 1993, she received the Cosmetic Executive Women Achiever Award. She was a member of Northwestern University's Council of 100 Women, and was named recipient of the 1996 Henry Johnson Fisher Award from the MPA – the Association of Magazine Media. Whitney's only book, Feminism and Love: Transforming Ourselves and Our World, was published in 1998.

== Personal life ==
She married fellow Northwestern University alumni Daniel Whitney on November 19, 1949. They had one son. In February 1995, Whitney's husband predeceased her from prostate cancer. She was diagnosed with Amyotrophic lateral sclerosis in 1997, causing her to lose the ability to speak and swallow, and died from the condition at her home in Irvington, New York, on June 4, 1999.

== Approach and legacy ==
Whitney was frank, kept a low profile as editor by not running a note at the front of Glamour, intelligent, open-minded, and was highly private about her personal life. She said her approach was not to make feminism intimidating but accessible to American women, and was pragmatic to including fashion items in the magazine, asking fashion editors, "Where is she going in that?" before allowing clothing that was photographed to be included in the publication and kept such coverage to slightly more than 50 percent of editorial content.

In 1992, Whitney asked Newhouse to establish two scholarships in her name at the Newhouse School of Journalism at Syracuse University to mark her 25th anniversary as Glamour's editor-in-chief. She was inducted into the Oshkosh High School Hall of Fame in February 1982, and was admitted into the ASME's Editor's Hall of Fame in April 1996. Whitney was posthumously named a Glamour Woman of the Year in November 1999.
