= American Society of Magazine Editors =

American industry trade group

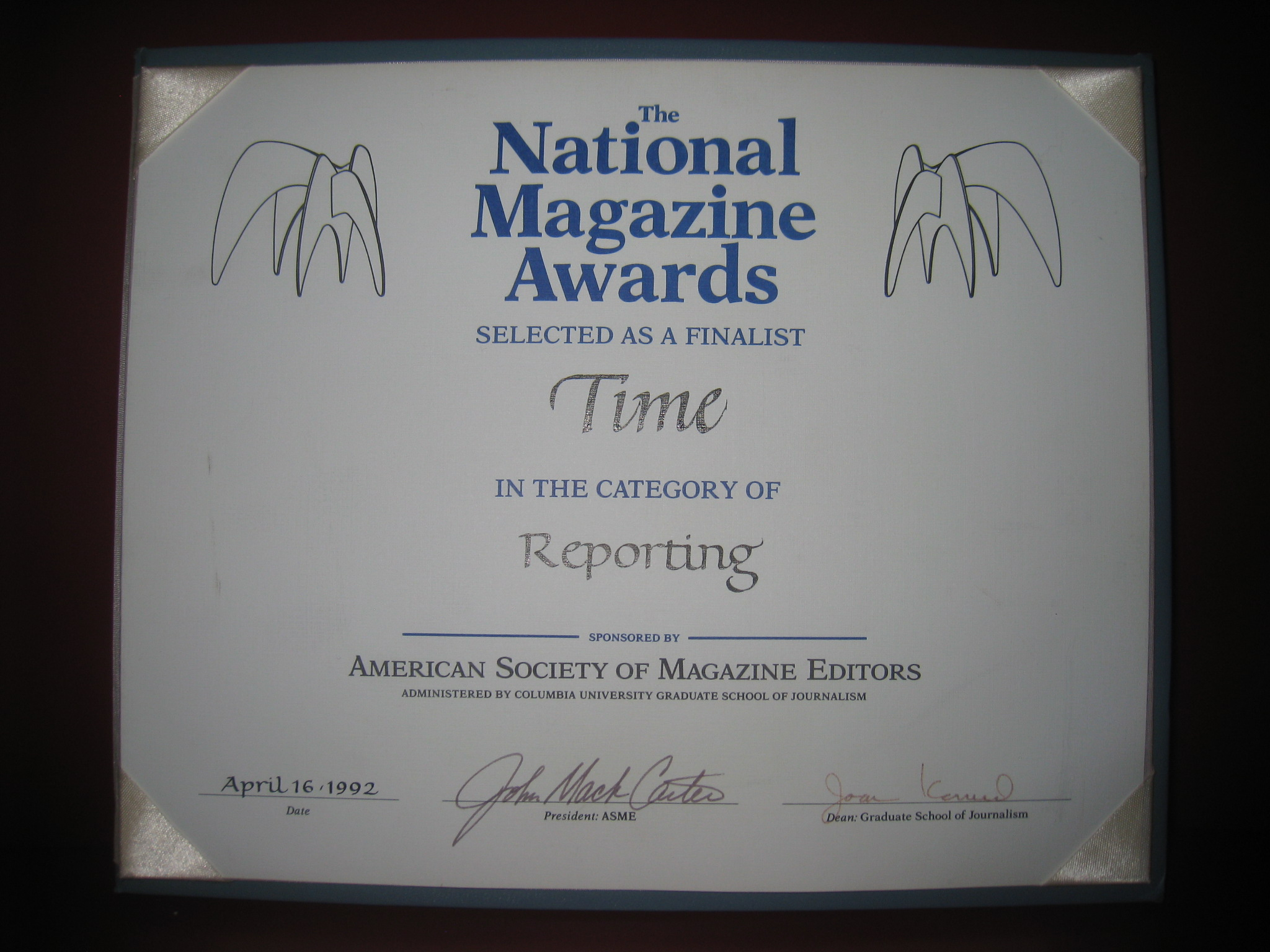
- Time magazine's ASME finalist certificate, issued in April 1992
- Type: Industry trade group for magazine journalists and editors
- Headquarters: United States
- Website: asme.media

The American Society of Magazine Editors (ASME) is an industry trade group for magazine journalists and editors of magazines published in the United States. ASME includes the editorial leaders of most major consumer magazine in print and digital extensions. The group advocates on behalf of member organizations with respect to First Amendment issues and serves as a networking hub for editors and other industry employees.

== History ==
ASME started as an outgrowth of the editorial committee of the Magazine Publishers of America in 1963. The initial goal of the organization was to defend the First Amendment, protect editorial independence and support the development of journalism.

== ASME programs ==
ASME has sponsored the National Magazine Awards (also known as the Ellie Awards) since 1966, along with the Graduate School of Journalism at Columbia University. The Ellie Awards honor print and digital magazines that consistently demonstrate superior execution of editorial objectives, innovative techniques, noteworthy journalistic enterprise, and imaginative art direction. In 1966, Look received the first award. Money received the first award for digital journalism in 1997.

Magazine Editors' Hall of Fame and Creative Excellence Awards honor editors, writers, and artists for career-long contributions to magazine journalism. Honorees are chosen by the ASME board of directors.

The ASME Best Cover Contest honors the most successful magazine covers of the year. The contest is two-fold: the ASME Best Cover Awards and the ASME Readers' Choice Awards. Each cover entered in the Best Cover Contest is eligible to win both a Best Cover Award and a Readers' Choice Award.

ASME hosts the annual American Magazine Media Conference, every year in February, a meeting for magazine media leaders. It is sponsored by the Association of Magazine Media in association with ASME. The conference addresses issues of concern to editors and publishers of print and digital publications.

Founded in 1967, the Magazine Internship Program places college juniors in internships at top consumer magazines for 10 weeks every summer. More than 250 alumni of this program now work in magazine media and include the editors in chief of major titles.

== Membership ==
To be eligible for membership into ASME, one must be employed by a print or digital magazine edited and distributed in the United States, this includes: senior editors, art directors and photography editors. There are also four categories of membership: Chief Editor, Editor, Retired Editor and ASME NEXT. Chief Editors, Editors and Retired Editors are entitled to all the privileges of ASME membership. ASME NEXT members are not eligible to vote in ASME elections.

== Administration ==
ASME is regulated by a 16-member board of directors, which serve 2-year terms. Directors may be selected for a second 2-year term upon election. Board elections are usually held during the first Wednesday in May at the ASME Annual Meeting. Currently, the chief executive of ASME is Sid Holt. The director is Nina Fortuna.

=== Board of directors 2015–2016 ===
- Mark Jannot, vice president, content, National Audubon Society, president
- James Bennet, editor in chief and co-president, The Atlantic, vice president
- Amy DuBois Barnett
- Dana Cowin, senior vice president, editor in chief, Food & Wine
- Scott Dadich, editor in chief, Wired
- Jonathan Dorn, senior vice president, Digital and Data, Active Interest Media
- Jill Herzig, editor in chief, Dr. Oz THE GOOD LIFE
- Christopher Keyes, vice president and editor, Outside
- Janice Min, co-president and chief creative officer, Guggenheim Media's Entertainment Group
- James Oseland, editor in chief, Rodale's Organic Life
- Norman Pearlstine, executive vice president and chief content officer, Time Inc.
- Dana Points, content director, Meredith Parents Network; editor in chief, Parents and American Baby
- Michele Promaulayko, editor in chief, Yahoo! Health
- Joshua Topolsky
- David Zinczenko, president and chief executive officer, Galvanized Brands
- Lucy Schulte Danziger, president and founder, 10 Point Ventures, Ex Officio

== Founders ==
=== Executive officers ===
- Ted Patrick, chairman
- Robert E. Kenyon Jr., secretary

=== Executive committee members ===
- Betsy Talbot Blackwell (1905–1985), Mademoiselle
- Mary Buchanan, Parents
- Ralph Daigh, Fawcett Publications
- John H. Johnson (1918–2005), Johnson Publishing Company
- Robert M. Jones, Family Circle
- Daniel Mich (né Daniel Danforth Mich; 1905–1965), Look
- Wade Hampton Nichols (1915–1996), Good Housekeeping
- Philip Salisbury, Bill Brothers Publishing Corp. (see Talking Machine World)
- Robert Stein (1924–1914), Redbook

== Former executives ==
=== Presidents ===
Name	Term
Ted Patrick	September 1963 – May 1964
Daniel D. Mich	May 1964 – December 1965
Robert Stein	December 1965 – September 1967
Wade H. Nichols	September 1967 – September 1968
Harold T. P. Hayes	September 1968 – September 1969
William B. Arthur	September 1969 – November 1971
Geraldine E. Rhoads	November 1971 – November 1973
Anderson Ashburn	November 1973 – October 1975
Ruth Whitney	October 1975 – October 1977
Dennis Flanagan	October 1977 – April 1980
Sey Chassler	April 1980 – April 1982
Richard B. Stolley	April 1982 – April 1984
Edward Kosner	April 1984 – April 1986
Judith Nolte	April 1986 – April 1988
Marshall Loeb	April 1988 – April 1990
John Mack Carter	April 1990 – April 1992
Stephen B. Shepard	April 1992 – April 1994
Ellen Levine	April 1994 – April 1996
Frank Lalli	April 1996 – April 1998
Jackie Leo	April 1998 – May 2000
George Curry	May 2000 – January 2001
Cyndi Stivers	January 2001 – May 2002
Susan Ungaro	May 2002 – May 2004
Mark Whitaker	May 2004 – May 2006
Cynthia Leive	May 2006 – May 2008
David Willey	May 2008 – May 2010
Larry Hackett	May 2010 – May 2012
Lucy Danziger	May 2012 – May 2013
Mark Jannot	May 2013 – present
