= Maine penny =

Norwegian silver coin

Coordinates: 44°14′06″N 68°32′38″W

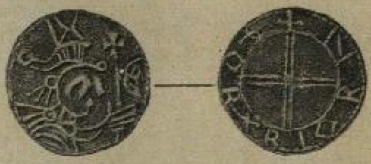
A coin similar to the Maine penny

The Maine penny, also referred to as the Goddard coin, is a Norwegian silver coin dating to the reign of Olaf Kyrre King of Norway (1067–1093 AD). It was claimed to be discovered in Maine in 1957, and it has been suggested as evidence of pre-Columbian transoceanic contact.

== Discovery ==
Guy Mellgren, a local resident and amateur archaeologist, said he found this coin on August 18, 1957, at the Goddard Site. This was an extensive archeological site at an old Native American settlement at Naskeag Point on Penobscot Bay in Brooklin, Maine. A 1978 article in Time called the discovery site an ancient Indian rubbish heap near the coastal town of Blue Hill. Over a lengthy period, a collection of 30,000 items from the site was donated to the Maine State Museum. The coin was donated in 1974.

== The coin ==
Much of the circumstances of the finding of the coin were not well preserved in the record (as was the case with the majority of the 30,000 finds). The coin was at first misidentified as a British penny from the 12th century. In 1978, experts from London considered that it might have been of Norse origin. Kolbjørn Skaare of the University of Oslo determined the coin was minted between 1065 and 1080 AD during the reign of Olaf Kyrre; such pennies were widely circulated in the twelfth and thirteenth centuries. The coin was found with a perforation, probably for use as a pendant. This area of the coin has since crumbled to dust from corrosion.

== Norse origin ==
The Goddard site has been dated to 1180–1235, within the circulation period of pennies of this type. The people who lived at the site at that time are generally considered to be ancestors of the Penobscot. While the date is around two hundred years after the last of the Vinland voyages (c. 1000) described in Norse sagas, it is well within the period during which the Norse lived in Greenland (10th to 15th centuries) and could have visited North America.

The penny's coastal origin has been offered as evidence either that the Norsemen from Greenland traveled farther south than Newfoundland or that the coin might have been traded locally. However, the penny was the only Norse artifact found at the site, which according to substantial evidence was a hub in a large native trade network. For example, a single artifact generally identified as a Dorset culture burin was also recovered there, and may support the idea that both the burin and the penny could plausibly have come to Maine through native trade-channels from Norse sources in Labrador or Newfoundland.

The Maine State Museum website favors the view that the coin was found at the site and is therefore evidence of Norse presence on the North American continent, although the Museum states "the most likely explanation for the coin's presence is that it was obtained by natives somewhere else, perhaps in Newfoundland where the only known New World Norse settlement has been found at L’Anse aux Meadows, and that it eventually reached the Goddard site through native trade channels". The Maine State Museum describes it as "the only pre-Columbian Norse artifact generally regarded as genuine found within the United States".

However, the possibility that it may be a hoax has been raised. This Norwegian silver coin and other similar coins of that era were available on the open market during 1957. Thus, Mellgren could have had the means and the opportunity to plant the coin at the site, or he could have been deceived by someone planting the coin – though it is unclear what the motive would have been. There are enough questions regarding the provenance of the coin to leave its archaeological significance unclear. An assessment of the validity of the find by anthropologist Edmund Snow Carpenter concluded: "Not proven".

Robert Hoge, writing for the American Numismatic Society in 2006, stated that "There is no reliable confirmation on the documentation of the Goddard coin, and much circumstantial evidence suggests that someone was deliberately trying to manipulate or obfuscate the situation. The Norse coin from Maine should probably be considered a hoax."

A November 2017 paper by Norwegian numismatist Svein Gullbeck suggests that the coin is a genuine find.

== Other sources ==
- Skaare, Kolbjorn (1976) Coins and Coinage in Viking-age Norway (Oslo: Universitetsforlaget) ISBN 9788200015420

== Related reading ==
- Bourque, Bruce (2004) Twelve Thousand Years: American Indians in Maine (University of Nebraska Press) ISBN 9780803262317
- Carpenter, Edmund (2003). Norse penny. New York: The Rock Foundation.
- Haviland, William (2012) Canoe Indians of Down East Maine (The History Press) ISBN 9781609496654
- Hovgaard, William (1914) The Voyages of the Norsemen to America (New York: The American-Scandinavian Foundation)
- Kolodny, Annette. (2012) In Search of First Contact: The Vikings of Vinland, the Peoples of the Dawnland, and the Anglo-American Anxiety of Discovery. (Durham & London: Duke University Press)
- Prins, Harald E.L.; McBride, Bunny (2007) Asticou's Island Domain: Wabanaki Peoples at Mount Desert Island 1500–2000. (Boston: National Park Service)
- Richard, Wilfred E.; William Fitzhugh (2014) Maine to Greenland: Exploring the Maritime Far Northeast (Smithsonian Institution) ISBN 9781588343796
