= Joel White =

American naval architect (1930–1997)

- Born: Joel McCoun White; 21 December 1930; Manhattan, New York, U.S.
- Died: 5 December 1997 (aged 66); Brooklin, Maine
- Occupation: Naval Architect
- Children: 3
- Parent(s): E.B. White; Katharine Sergeant Angell White

Joel McCoun White (December 21, 1930 – December 5, 1997) was an American naval architect.

== Early life and education ==
Born in Manhattan, White was the only child of the writer E. B. White and his wife Katharine Sergeant Angell White, fiction editor of The New Yorker. He was the son with whom E. B. White revisited the lake where he had gone on boyhood vacations, as chronicled in his 1941 essay "Once More to the Lake"; the essayist Roger Angell was his half-brother. He grew up in North Brooklin, Maine and attended Cornell University, then transferred after two years to MIT, from where he graduated in 1953 with a bachelor's degree in naval architecture.

== Career ==
White worked as a boat builder in Newport News, Virginia, served in the Army, then in 1960, in a former herring-packing plant, established Brooklin Boat Yard, where he became known for simple, classic craft from dinghies to yachts, mostly in wood. His Nutshell Pram, under 8 ft long, was sold in plywood kit form. The 15-foot Haven 12½ sailboat has a reputation for stability and for handling shallow water. The Bridges Point 24 is a 24-foot fiberglass sailboat. His last design, a 76-foot racing yacht in 1920s style, was realized and further developed by Donald Tofias, and has been named W-Class after White. He contributed designs to WoodenBoat magazine and in 1988 published Wood, Water & Light: Classic Wooden Boats, with photographs by Benjamin Mendlowitz; in the New York Times, Christopher Lehmann-Haupt called it a "lovely work [that] includes a dinghy, a runabout, a lobsterboat, a peapod, a sardine carrier, an oceangoing yacht, several speedboats and all manner of sailboats". The Brooklin Boat Yard continues under employee ownership as of 2026.

== Personal life and death ==
White and his wife, Allene, had two sons and a daughter. He died of lung cancer in 1997 at home in Brooklin, Maine.. White was succeeded as owner and president of the Brooklin Boat Yard by his son Steven, who served as president from 1986 to 2023.
