= Edward Ennis =

American civil rights lawyer (1908–1990)

Edward J. Ennis (1908–1990) was an American civil rights lawyer. He worked for the Department of Justice in the 1930s and 1940s, where as director of the alien enemy control unit he oversaw the Japanese American internment. He contributed to the American Civil Liberties Union's efforts to fight the internment, and after World War II resigned from the Department of Justice to join the ACLU, where he rose up through the organization and eventually served as its president from 1969 to 1976.

== Career ==
Ennis graduated from Columbia University Law School in 1932, and went on to work for the Department of Justice for fourteen years. He was a member of the National Lawyers Guild in the 1930s, but withdrew from the organization, believing it to be under the influence of Communists. He held a variety of positions in the Department of Justice, including as general counsel for the Immigration and Naturalization Service, director of the alien enemy control unit, and administrator of foreign travel control. His role made him the administrator of the Japanese American internment. Ennis chose not resign from his role at that time, but he did help American Civil Liberties Union head Roger Baldwin to come up with legal strategies to oppose the internment, and testified at the trial of Gordon Hirabayashi about the Department of War's withholding of evidence relating to Japanese Americans' loyalty to the United States.

In 1946, Ennis did resign from the Department of Justice, and joined the board of the ACLU himself. He became the ACLU's general counsel in 1955, and was elected chairman of the ACLU in 1969, succeeding Ernest Angell who was retiring after 19 years with the organization. He served as ACLU president until 1976, during which time he called for the resignation of President Richard Nixon and an end to the property tax exemption enjoyed by religious organizations. Notwithstanding the former, he was critical of the zealousness of opposition to Nixon shown by Charles Morgan, Jr. of the ACLU's Washington, D.C. office. He was succeeded as ACLU president by Norman Dorsen. He remained a member of the ACLU executive committee until 1985.

== Death ==
Ennis died of diabetes complications on January 7, 1990, at Lenox Hill Hospital in New York City. He was survived by his wife Marie Joyce and his stepson Mark C. Zauderer.
