= Ted Patrick (editor) =

American editor

Edwin Hill Patrick (September 3, 1901–March 11, 1964) was the key American editor for Holiday, an influential travel and literary magazine published by the Curtis Publishing Company. Under Patrick's editorship from 1946 and until his death in 1964, the magazine published 215 issues and grew circulation to one million subscribers. The magazine published many famous authors including James Michener, E. B. White, Truman Capote and Lawrence Durell. Patrick was also the founding Chairman of the American Society of Magazine Editors.

== Early life ==
Patrick was born in 1901 in Rutherford, New Jersey.

== Career ==
Ted Patrick's early career included a stint as a semi-professional baseball player and as a sports reporter for the Rutherford Republican. In 1928, he joined Young & Rubicam as an advertising copywriter.

In the 1930s, he wrote volunteer copy for World Peaceways, an anti-war organization that used modern advertising techniques (or propaganda) to counteract "the artificial glories of war." One of his contributions in a national magazine showed a steel-helmeted skeleton captioned 'Cornfed Kid from the West.' After war came, however, Patrick wrote copy for and served as the head of graphics and printed material for the Office of War Information.

In 1944, Patrick joined Compton Advertising as vice-president and a director. Two years later he joined the Curtis Publishing Company, a significant periodical publisher with general interest magazines such as the Ladies' Home Journal and the Saturday Evening Post. Curtis soon asked Patrick to take over as editor of its recently launched travel magazine, Holiday. Patrick turned the flagging title into a beautiful full-color over-sized magazine that focused on travel essays by famous writers, supported by outstanding art direction. The atmosphere at the magazine was later said to have resembled Mad-Men. Patrick quickly took the magazine to 450,000 subscribers in its first year and by the time of his death in 1964 it had just reached one million.

Patrick had a full set of interests reflected in the magazine. The New York Times called out "good food and drinks, travel, watching baseball and playing tennis, breeding champion Airedale terriers, writing about these matters and living life to the full occupied Mr. Patrick over the years. Patrick was a gourmet and noted that "Food is a determining factor where to go, where to stop. Food is a determinant in the enjoyment of any place or any carrier. Food can make or mar any holiday. Food can play a potent part in making life dull or exciting...." "Ted was the ideal choice as editor of Holiday," wrote Michael Callahan in Vanity Fair. "An international traveler, gourmet, and jazz enthusiast, he possessed three critical skills: the ability to coax great stories out of great writers, a formidable tennis game, and the knack for mixing a great martini."

In speaking of the difference between editing and advertising, Patrick said, "The difference is that an editor is left to his own devices. He doesn't have a client--that's the biggest difference in the world. Your only client is the reader, and for that reason you can go directly to him."

During the McCarthy era, Patrick did not back down from pressure by advertisers. After publishing an article by Arthur Miller about McCarthyism on the campus of his college alma mater University of Michigan, the Pontiac department of General Motors told Patrick that they would stop advertising if Patrick printed another article by Miller. Patrick immediately asked Miller to write a second article which resulted in an article about his childhood in Brooklyn, "A Boy Grew in Brooklyn." Miller didn't learn of the story until several years after Patrick's death, "As it turned out, my second piece did not dry up the Pontiac account, but the air in those days bristled with such threats, and I regretted being unable to congratulate Patrick for his defense, particularly courageous at the time, of editorial integrity."

Patrick founded the American Society of Magazine Editors (ASME) in 1963 and served as the first elected Chairman. He hoped that the organization would keep help "to strengthen the influence of magazines as a primary source of information and ideas." A fellow magazine executive stated of Patrick's appointment, "This man has the respect of the industry for the kind of job he's done at Holiday. And he'll get things done for the industry."

Patrick died suddenly at age 62 of Hepatitis. A few months before his death, several advertising executives took out a full-page advertisement in the New York Times to honor Patrick and his work. The letter from the advertisers read, "...We applaud your belief that "an editor's only boss is the reader. We applaud your indifference to the pressures of advertisers and the heckling of publishers...Nobody else could have created a magazine which is equally distinguished for its graphics and writing. Cartier-Bresson and Steinbeck, Arnold Newman and William Golding, Slim Aarons and Seán Ó Faoláin, John Lewis Stage and Laurens van der Post. Month after month, year after year, you entertain us and you enthrall us...."

== Personal life ==
Ted Patrick was married to Vera Yereance who died a few short months before Patrick.

Patrick was described by Vanity Fair as an alcoholic.

Patrick was a member of Confrérie des Chevaliers du Tastevin, an exclusive club for wine enthusiasts founded in 1934. Ted lived at 455 East 51st Street in New York City, New York.

== Books ==
Patrick wrote for magazines. Apart from Forewords, his work only rarely appeared between hard covers.

- Great Restaurants of America (co-authored with Silas Spitzer). Philadelphia: Lippincott, 1960.
- The Thinking Dog's Man. New York: Random House, 1964. (published posthumously)
