= Ernest Angell =

American lawyer and ALCU president (1889–1973)

President of the American Civil Liberties Union
- In office 1950–1969
- Preceded by: John Haynes Holmes
- Succeeded by: Edward J. Ennis

Personal details
- Born: June 1, 1889 Cleveland, Ohio, U.S.
- Died: January 11, 1973 (aged 83) New York City, U.S.
- Spouse(s): Katharine Sargeant (m. 1915; div. 1929) Elizabeth Brosius Higgins Chapin (m. 1939; died 1970)
- Education: Harvard College (BA, LLB); Bard College (LLD)

Ernest Angell (June 1, 1889 – January 11, 1973) was an American lawyer and author who served as President of the American Civil Liberties Union for 19 years, from 1950 to 1969.

== Early life ==
Angell was born in Cleveland on June 1, 1889, the son of Elgin Angell and Lily (née Curtis) Angell. When he was 9 years old, his father (a lawyer who practiced with Robert E. McKisson) was killed in the sinking of the SS La Bourgogne.

He graduated from Harvard College, where he was elected Phi Beta Kappa, in 1911, and from Harvard Law School in 1913. He received an LL.D. degree from Bard College in 1954.

== Career ==
During World War I, Angell served as an infantry Captain in the American Expeditionary Force, a part of the U.S. Army, in Europe.

Beginning in 1920, he practiced corporation law in New York with Hardin, Hess, Eder & Freschi and Spence, Windels, Walser, Hotchkiss & Angell before joining the U.S. Securities and Exchange Commission as a regional administrator for New York from April 1, 1936, to May 1, 1938, replacing Robert G. Page. He served as chairman of the National Economy League. Angell wrote a "short book on the Supreme Court", entitled Supreme Court Primer, and was the author of various magazine articles.

In 1941, he succeeded Charles Douglas Jackson as the second president of the Council for Democracy, which had been formed in 1940. In 1948, he was selected by the U.S. Civil Service Commission to be chairman of the Loyalty Board for the second region, covering New York and New Jersey.

From 1950 to 1969, Angell succeeded Dr. John Haynes Holmes to serve as president of the American Civil Liberties Union. After his retirement in 1969, he was succeeded by Edward Ennis, who had been the general counsel of the ACLU since 1955.

== Personal life ==
In 1915, he married his first wife Katharine Sergeant (1892–1977) in Brookline, Massachusetts. Katharine was a graduate of Miss Winsor's School and Bryn Mawr before becoming the fiction editor at The New Yorker. Before their divorce in 1929, they were the parents of:

- Roger Angell (1920–2022), a writer.
- Nancy Angell (1916–1996), the former head of the science department at Moravian Seminary for Girls, who married Louis T. Stableford.

Katherine had had an affair with writer E. B. White and married him after her divorce from Angell. In 1939, Angell remarried to Elizabeth Brosius (née Higgins) Chapin, the former wife of Vinton Chapin, the United States Ambassador to Luxembourg. Before her death in 1970, they were the parents of two children together:

- Christopher Curtis Angell, who married Margaret Blettner in 1971.
- Abigail Brosius Angell, who married Cass Canfield Jr. (1923–2013), son of Cass Canfield, in 1973. His younger brother Michael Canfield was the first husband of Lee Radziwill.

Angell died at 156 East 66th Street, his home in Manhattan, on January 11, 1973, at age 83, after suffering heart problems.
