= Beth Eden Baptist Church =

Beth Eden Baptist Church may refer to:

- Beth Eden Baptist Church (Oakland, California)
- Beth Eden Baptist Church in Wheat Ridge, Colorado
- Beth Eden Baptist Church in Fitchburg, Massachusetts
- Beth Eden Baptist Church (Savannah, Georgia)
- Beth Eden Baptist Church (Waltham, Massachusetts)
- Beth Eden Baptist Church in Fort Worth, Texas
- Beth Eden Baptist Church in Chicago

== See also ==
- Beth Eden (disambiguation)
