= Season Ticket: A Baseball Companion =

1988 book by Roger Angell

- Author: Roger Angell
- Cover artist: Paul Bacon
- Language: English
- Genre: Non-fiction
- Publisher: Houghton Mifflin Company
- Publication date: 1988
- Publication place: United States
- Media type: Print (Hardcover)
- Pages: 406
- ISBN: 0-395-38165-7
- Dewey Decimal: 796.3570973

Season Ticket: A Baseball Companion is a 1988 book written by Roger Angell, whose previous works include Five Seasons, Late Innings, and the New York Times best-seller, The Summer Game. Angell was considered one of the country's premier baseball writers.

== Summary ==
Season Ticket is a collection of articles written by Angell for The New Yorker magazine between 1984 and 1987. The articles are presented as 15 chapters in the book starting with a 1987 article that discuses different aspects of the game. Successive articles, as explained in the book's preface, generally follow the 1984-1987 chronology except where Angell believed that an out of order approach improved the book's logical flow.

- Chapter 1: La Vida. In the book's first chapter, written in 1987, Angell visits several spring training facilities. One of the visits included a conversation with Earl Weaver, the manager of the Baltimore Orioles. Weaver, during the conversation, mentioned the durability of the Orioles' Cal Ripken and how he had predicted in 1982 that Ripken was so good that he could be written into the lineup for the next 15 years. His comment about Ripken, who in 1995 set baseball's the all time consecutive games played record, has been referred to as "...one of the most incredibly prescient (and well-documented) "first-guesses" in recorded literature."
- Chapter 2: In the Fire. A discussion of catching with Bob Boone, Tim McCarver, Carlton Fisk, and Ted Simmons.
- Chapter 3: The Baltimore Fancy. Angell focuses on the success of the Orioles, concluding the chapter with a review of the 1983 World Series where Baltimore defeated the Philadelphia Phillies in five games.
- Chapter 4: Easy Lessons. A tour of 1984 spring training camps includes talks with players Reggie Jackson, Rusty Staub, and Oakland Athletics owner Roy Eisenhardt.
- Chapter 5: Being Green. An entire chapter devoted to Eisenhardt's attempt to build a successful and profitable Oakland team.
- Chapter 6: Tiger, Tiger. Written in October 1984, chapter 6 discusses the American League and National League pennant races that culminate in the 1984 World Series between the Detroit Tigers and San Diego Padres.
- Chapter 7: Taking Infield. Former Red Sox second baseman Jerry Remy and San Francisco Giants manager Bill Rigney are among those that Angell converses with while describing the challenges of playing the infield.
- Chapter 8: Summery. The summer of 1985 featured the success of The New York Mets, Orioles, and Red Sox.
- Chapter 9: Quis. Dan Quisenberry a pitcher for the Kansas City Royals with a unique sidearm pitch is the focus.
- Chapter 10: To Missouri. Angell writes about the all-Missouri 1985 World Series between the Royals and the St. Louis Cardinals.
- Chapter 11: The Cheers for Keith. Angell visits spring training facilities in 1986 and devotes most of his writing to the cocaine scandals of the day in sports and Keith Hernandez of the Mets.
- Chapter 12: Fortuity. Angell writes about the ability of some teams to win and discusses the same with Bill Rigney, Tom Seaver, and Eisenhardt.
- Chapter 13: Not So, Boston. Throughout the book Angell reveals that he is a long time fan of both the Red Sox and the Mets, who play against each other in the 1986 World Series. Angell painfully reviews the series to include Bill Buckner’s historic error in game six and the eventual collapse of the Red Sox, despite their 3–2 series lead when they left Boston.
- Chapter 14: The Arms Talks. Angell visits spring training facilities in 1987 and has extended discussion with pitchers about the 1980s Split-finger fastball and how the new pitch compared to the 1970s development of the slider. Roger Craig, the San Francisco Giants manager, discussed how he successfully taught the pitch during the decade to many different pitchers.
- Chapter 15: Up at The Hall. For the first time in his life, in 1987 Angell visits the Baseball Hall of Fame in Cooperstown, New York.

== Reviews ==
Season Ticket: A Baseball Companion was favorably reviewed by critics, who equally praised both Angell’s understanding and explanation of baseball as well as his ability to create some of the country’s best prose. An example from the book was cited by several reviewers:

Baseball is not life itself, although the resemblance keeps coming up. Old fans, if they're anything like me, can't help noticing how cunningly our game replicates the larger schedule, with its beguiling April optimism; the cheerful roughhouse of June ... and then the abrupt running-down of autumn, when we wish for--almost demand--a prolonged and glittering final adventure just before the curtain. – excerpt from Chapter 1: La Vida

Other comments from critics include,

As one of the game's delectable accessories, his prose ranks up there with Vin Scully's voice and Gulden's mustard. Unlike the daily newspaper writers he admires, Angell has the luxury of time and space, which meshes nicely with a sport that has no clock and foul lines that extend to infinity. His first collection, 1972's best-selling The Summer Game, has been called the "essential" volume on the sport; subsequent collections, 1977's Five Seasons and 1982's Final Innings, have also won raves. His prose, however, has the grace of Mays and the charm of Stengel: "One begins to see at last that the true function of the Red Sox may be not to win but to provide New England authors with a theme, now that guilt and whaling have gone out of style."

... Angell's prose is like a sunny afternoon in the bleachers at Wrigley Field or Fenway Park: filled with wonder and good cheer and the warm-all-over-feeling of baseball's - and we're talking the game of baseball, not the industry - of baseball's simple pleasure.

One critic, writing for the Orlando Sentinel, faulted Angell for excessive praise of players and a failure to discuss drug use and the public perception of some baseball players as "lazy" and "overpaid" athletes.
