= Is Sex Necessary? Or, Why You Feel the Way You Do =

1929 spoof book of essays by E.B. White and James Thurber

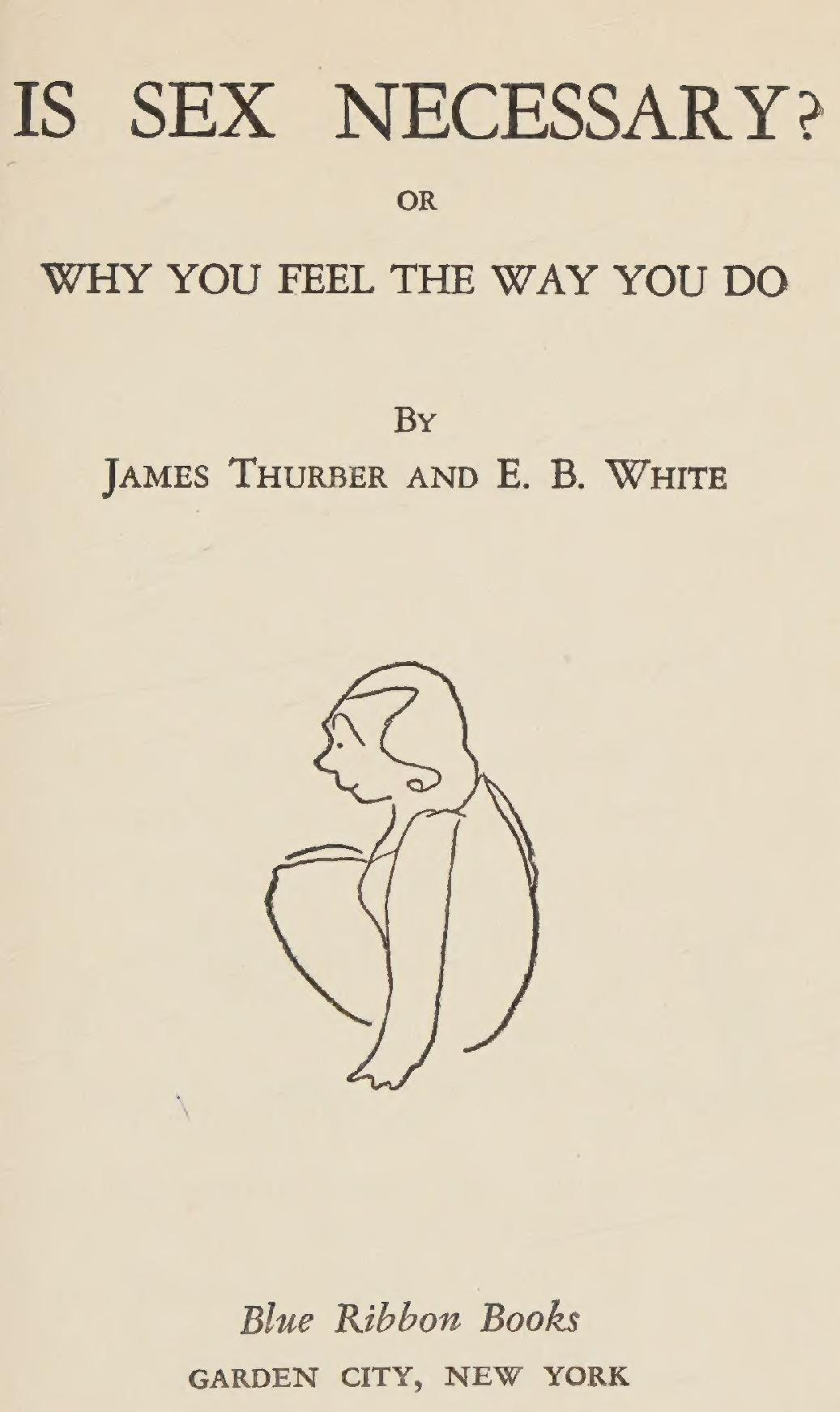
- Title page
- Author: E. B. White; James Thurber
- Language: English
- Genre: Essay collection
- Publication date: 1929
- Publication place: United States

Is Sex Necessary? Or, Why You Feel the Way You Do is a collection of essays written by E. B. White and James Thurber, first published in 1929.

The book is a spoof of the many popular books on Freudian sexual theories published in the 1920s. In a preface for the 1950 edition, White recalled, "Thurber and I were neither more, nor less, interested in the subject of love and marriage than anybody else of our age in that era. I recall that we were both profoundly interested in earning a living, and I think we somehow managed, simultaneously, to arrive at the conclusion that ... the heavy writers had got sex down and were breaking its arm. We were determined that sex should maintain its high spirits."

White and Thurber wrote alternate chapters, then compared them for overlap. They invented numerous pseudo-sexual terms, including Diversion Subterfuge, Osculatory Justification, and Schmalhausen Trouble. They also fabricated the names of psychologists and sex researchers, including Dr. Karl Zaner and Dr. Walter Titheridge.

White and Thurber held little hope of publication but Harper's, which had published White's first book of poetry, came out with a small printing of 2,500 copies in November 1929. The book became a bestseller and launched the publishing careers of both Thurber and White. A critic for the Saturday Review of Literature called the book, "One of the silliest books in years, and perfectly lovely. It left this reviewer partially paralyzed, with a written face streaming with tears." The book also introduced readers to Thurber's spare cartoons, which soon became a regular feature in The New Yorker.

The 75th anniversary edition published in 2004 includes a foreword by John Updike.

As of 2025 the original edition entered the public domain in the United States.
