= Bridges Point 24 =

Sailboat class

Development
- Designer: Joel White
- Location: United States
- Year: 1985
- No. built: 80
- Builders: Bridges Point Boatyard; Bridges Point Boat Company
- Role: Day sailer-Cruiser
- Name: Bridges Point 24

Boat
- Displacement: 3,944 lb (1,789 kg)
- Draft: 3.42 ft (1.04 m)

Hull
- Type: monohull
- Construction: fiberglass
- LOA: 24.00 ft (7.32 m)
- LWL: 18.67 ft (5.69 m)
- Beam: 7.75 ft (2.36 m)
- Engine: inboard diesel engine or gasoline engine, or outboard motor

Hull appendages
- Keel: long keel
- Ballast: 2,100 lb (953 kg)
- Rudder: keel-mounted rudder

Rig
- Rig type: Bermuda rig

Sails
- Sailplan: fractional rigged sloop
- Mainsail area: 178 sq ft (16.5 m^{2})
- Jib/genoa area: 100 sq ft (9.3 m^{2})
- Total sail area: 278 sq ft (25.8 m^{2})

Racing
- PHRF: 246

The Bridges Point 24 is a recreational keelboat first built in 1985 by Bridges Point Boatyard, and later by the Bridges Point Boat Company in Bar Harbor, Maine, and remains in production.

The boat was originally a 1984 design commission by Wade Dow, a local lobster fisherman, who wanted a boat to sail in the off-season, with an emphasis on traditional aesthetics. Dow put the boat into production and produced 80 examples over 25 years. In 2008, with waning demand, the molds were put into storage.

In 2012 Dow offered the molds to Jock Williams of the John Williams Boat Company to restart production, but Williams declined. The molds were instead purchased by an employee of his, Bill Wright, the production department manager, who formed the Bridges Point Boat Company to produce the design.

== Design ==
Designed by Joel White, the hull is built of seven-layer, hand laid fiberglass, with extensive wood trim. It has a fractional sloop rig; a spooned, raked stem; a raised counter, angled transom; a lazarette; a keel-mounted rudder controlled by a tiller and a fixed long keel. It displaces 3,944 lb (1,789 kg) and carries 2,100 lb (953 kg) of lead ballast.

The boat has a draft of 3.42 ft (1.04 m) with the standard keel.

The boat has a choice of inboard Yanmar diesel engines or gasoline engines, or 4 to 10 hp (3 to 7 kW) outboard motors for docking and maneuvering. If an outboard motor is fitted it is mounted in a stern well.

The design has sleeping accommodation for four people, with a double "V"-berth in the bow cabin and two quarter berths aft, under the cockpit. The galley is located on the port side just forward of the companionway ladder. The galley is equipped with a two-burner stove and a sink, with an icebox optional. The head is portable type. Cabin headroom is 53 in (130 cm).

During early production a daysailer or cruiser option was offered. The former has a longer cockpit and smaller cabin. Kits for amateur completion were also offered.

The design has a PHRF racing average handicap of 246 and a hull speed of 5.8 kn (10.7 km/h).

In a 2010 review of the Bridges Point Boatyard model, Steve Henkel wrote, "Best features: This boat features very high quality construction in the Maine boatyard tradition. If you buy new, you can have pretty much whatever kind of boat you want. Worst feature: New or used, you'd better bring your checkbook with you—the one for the account with lots of disposable cash."

== Operational history ==
The boat is supported by an active class club that organizes racing events, the Bridges Point Sailing Club.
