= Once More to the Lake =

Essay by E. B. White

"Once More to the Lake" is an essay first published in Harper's Magazine in 1941 by author E. B. White. It chronicles his pilgrimage back to a lakefront resort, Belgrade Lakes, Maine, that he visited as a child.

In "Once More to the Lake," White revisits his ideal boyhood vacation spot. While he initially finds great joy in his visit, the nostalgia causes him to struggle to remember that he is now a man, as he grapples with his own mortality.

== Background ==
White wrote a short pamphlet about the lake in 1914, at the age of 15. A second draft of the essay was a letter White wrote to his brother Stanley in the summer of 1936, when he had returned to the lake alone. In 1941, he brought his son Joel, the experience of which is recorded in "Once More to the Lake".

== Interpretations ==
The essay shows White engaging in an internal struggle between acting and viewing the lake as he did when he was a boy and acting and viewing it as an adult, or as his father would have. Although White sees the lake as having remained nearly identical to the lake of his boyhood, technology bars his experience and the new, noisier boats disturb the serene atmosphere at the lake. This could suggest that technology is impure or damaging, except that the same paragraph contains a lengthy reminiscence in which White rhapsodizes about his boyhood affection for an old one-cylinder engine. The memory balances the theme of technology, suggesting that certain kinds of technology, if a person can "get close to it spiritually," are able to become almost a natural part of one's self.

The author compares the time he went fishing with his dad and how he's fishing now with his son:

I looked at the boy, who was silently watching his fly, and it was my hands that held his rod, my eyes watching. I felt dizzy and didn't know which rod I was at the end of.

He suddenly realizes how death is so close, because he is now the father and not the son. White references this in the final lines:

I watched him, his hard little body, skinny and bare, saw him wince slightly as he pulled up around his vitals the small, soggy, icy garment. As he buckled the swollen belt suddenly my groin felt the chill of death.

White realizes that although human lives are by themselves transient and insignificant, experiences are immortal. In spite of the increasing amounts of technology, his son still has the same experiences that he had when he was a boy – sneaking out in the morning, being amused by the dragonflies. White releases his ego by realizing that he himself is inconsequential.
