= Brooklin IOOF Hall =

- U.S. National Register of Historic Places
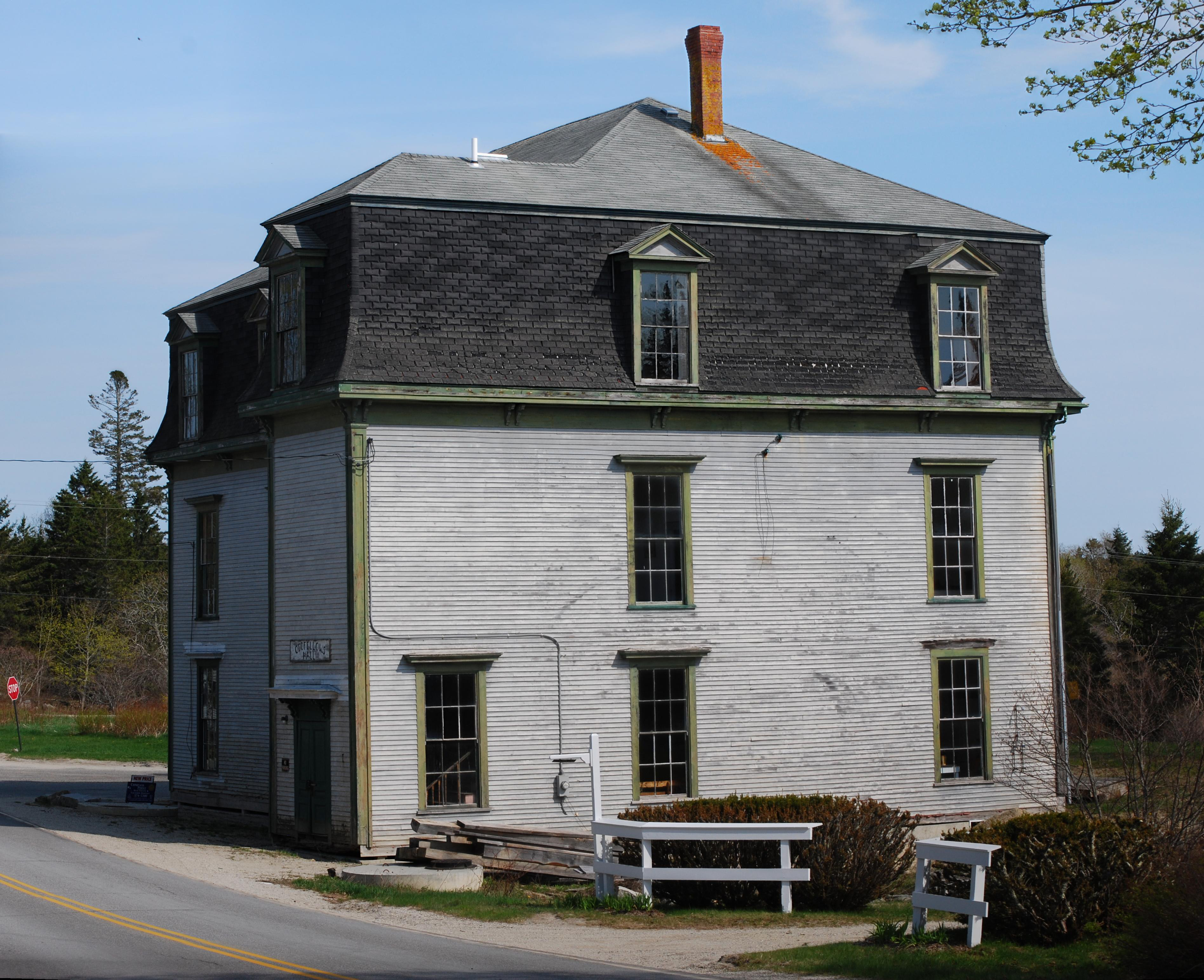

- Location within Maine Location within the United States
- Location: SR 175, Brooklin, Maine
- Coordinates: 44°15′56″N 68°34′49″W
- Area: less than one acre
- Built: 1896
- Architect: Bent, Ralph E.
- Architectural style: Second Empire
- NRHP reference No.: 89002341
- Added to NRHP: January 26, 1990

The Brooklin IOOF Hall is a commercial and fraternal society building at the junction of Center Harbor Road and Reach Road (Maine State Route 175) in Brooklin, Maine. The three-story Second Empire style building was erected in 1875, and is one of the small community's largest 19th-century buildings and one of its architecturally most significant. It was listed on the National Register of Historic Places in 1990.

== Description and history ==
The Brooklin IOOF Hall is a three-story wood frame structure located a short way west of the center of Brookin on Maine State Route 175. It has a mansard hip roof with gabled dormers, and is basically rectangular, except for a projecting stairwell at the northwest corner. The main facade faces east, and is divided into two bays, separated by a brick chimney sheathed in weatherboard up to the roof, and then with a slightly projecting roof section built around it. The first floor of the building is divided into two storefronts, with entrances near the outer corners and windows toward the center, their interior finished in tongue-and-groove woodwork on the walls and ceilings. The second floor was designed as a community auditorium space, with plaster walls and a tongue-and-groove ceiling. The lodge space on the third floor is more elaborate, with a medallion in the ceiling, and retaining its original regalia, including benches, seats, and podium.

The hall was built in 1896, and remains one of the small town's largest and architecturally most distinguished buildings. The principal alterations since its construction include the addition of the chimney to the front of the building, and the conversion of what was originally a four-story tower to what is now the stairwell. At the time of its listing on the National Register in 1990, it was still in active use by the local chapter of the International Order of Odd Fellows.

== See also ==
- National Register of Historic Places listings in Hancock County, Maine
