= John Mack Carter =

American women's magazine editor

- Born: February 28, 1928; Murray, Kentucky, USA
- Died: September 26, 2014 (aged 86)
- Education: University of Missouri (BA, MA) 1949
- Occupation(s): Editor, publisher
- Years active: 1949-2014
- Children: 2
- Awards: • American Society of Magazine Editors (2000) • Advertising Women of New York award • New York Women in Communications award • National Women's Political Caucus award

John Mack Carter (February 28, 1928 – September 26, 2014) was an American magazine editor, best known for his editorship of multiple women's magazines.

Carter served as editor of each of the "Big Three" women's magazines: McCall's from 1961 to 1965, Ladies' Home Journal from 1965 to 1974, and Good Housekeeping from 1975 to 1994. Under his tenure magazines began putting photos of celebrities on the cover which became a commonplace practice. As head of Hearst Magazine Enterprises he also helped create and develop other magazines, including the financial magazine SmartMoney, Marie Claire and Country Living. He was inducted into the Hall of Fame of the American Society of Magazine Editors in 2000.

In March 1970, more than 100 feminists led by Susan Brownmiller stormed Carter's office at the Ladies' Home Journal and held an eleven-hour sit-in, demanding that he resign. He declined but, after that, strove to become more responsive to the concerns of women. He published essays by some of the protesters in a later issue about divorce, childbirth, and other feminist issues. Upon later reflection, he described the sit-in event as a turning point in his thinking. After that, he was more willing to publish stories about job discrimination and sexual harassment and work to advance causes related to women.
