= Holiday (magazine) =

American travel magazine

- Categories: Travel magazine
- Frequency: bi-annual
- First issue: 1946; 80 years ago
- Final issue: 1977; 49 years ago
- Country: United States
- Based in: Philadelphia
- Language: English
- Website: www.holiday-magazine.com
- ISSN: 0018-3520

Holiday was an American travel magazine published from 1946 to 1977, whose circulation grew to more than one million subscribers at its height. The magazine employed writers such as Alfred Bester, Truman Capote, Joan Didion, Lawrence Durell, James Michener, and E. B. White.

In 2014, the magazine was relaunched as a bi-annual magazine based in Paris, but written in English.

== History ==
Launched by the Curtis Publishing Company, the first issue of Holiday appeared in March 1946. The magazine was headquartered in Philadelphia, Pennsylvania in the Curtis Center near Independence Hall. After a lackluster start, with the fifth issue Ted Patrick became editor, a position he held until his sudden death in 1964. By the end of the first year the circulation topped 425,000.

The magazine was known as a cosmopolitan travel wishbook with photo essays in full-color oversize 11 X 13.5 package along with articles by famous authors. John Lewis Stage, a photographer for Holiday described how Patrick enlisted name authors: "The concept was basically to get famous authors who had maybe one or two weeks in between their books or projects to go and travel and write glorious pieces. So you’d have James Michener sent off to the South Pacific, for example. It was an intriguing way to put together a magazine. It was an oddball publication that used photographs to tell stories".

Paul Theroux writing about Paul Bowles said of the magazine, "The frivolous name masked a serious literary mission. The English fiction writers, V. S. Pritchett and Lawrence Durrell also traveled for this magazine, so did John Steinbeck after he won his Nobel Prize for literature, when he crisscrossed the United States with his dog....Bowles wrote a piece for Holiday about hashish, another of his enthusiasms, since he was a life-long stoner.

The magazine came of age in the Jet Age, when Americans were beginning to travel for leisure and joining the jet set was a glamorous aspiration. A Vanity Fair article in 2013 stated that "what Vogue did for fashion, Holiday did for destinations. Many remember the atmosphere of the editorial department as resembling Mad-Men. The son of executive editor Carl Biemiller described the atmosphere "there was one hell of a cocktail-party circuit..."

E. B. White wrote his 7500-word essay on the city of New York, "Here is New York", for the magazine in 1949. White's stepson, Roger Angell, worked at the magazine in 1948.The essay was published as a gift book by Harper and it was also released as a Book-of-the-Month Club edition. Vanity Fair has since said of the essay, "It would become not only one of the most famous essays ever composed about the island of Manhattan but perhaps the finest. Over the years its plaintive language has been categorized as both poem and hymn." After 9/11, Vanity Fair also published the essay in book form in 2002 as a tribute.

By 1961 the magazine was making almost $10 million a year in revenue, and by the next year circulation had grown to just under a million.

After Ted Patrick's sudden death in 1964 there were internal issues between the current staff and Curtis Publishing Company over the direction of the magazine. Don A. Schanche of The Saturday Evening Post succeeded Patrick as editor. In response four of the editors, Harry Sions (editorial director), Frank Zachary (managing editor), Albert H. Farnsworth (executive editor), and Louis F. V. Mercier (pictures editor) resigned. Several of the magazine's writers, artists and photographers put out a large ad in the New York Times to "salute" the four as "good editors."

In 1977, Curtis sold Holiday to the publisher of Travel, a competing magazine, who merged the titles as a new publication, Travel Holiday.

== 21st century relaunch ==
Holiday relaunched in April 2014 by the Atelier Franck Durand, a Paris-based art direction studio, with Marc Beaugé as editor-in-chief and Franck Durand as creative director. The magazine is a bi-annual, conceived in Paris and written in English. Its official website mentions an upcoming café and clothing line. Durand described the new magazine, "It is not like the old Holiday when they had millions and they'd travel for weeks and week. But the concept is the same."

The issue n°373 of Holiday Magazine, first issue since the relaunch, was dedicated to the year 1969 and Ibiza.

The issue n°373 includes contributions from photographers Josh Olins, Karim Sadli and Mark Peckmezian, a short novel about Ibiza by novelist Arthur Dreyfus, a story on Inez van Lamsweerde and Vinoodh Matadin's New York loft, and the cover features a chosen fragment of Remed's painting "Leonogone". The first issue featured an essay about the history of the original Holiday Magazine.

== Notable editors ==
- Carl Biemiller (also children's book author)
- John Knowles, American novelist
- Ted Patrick, editor in 1948 until his death in 1964
- Harry Sions, former war correspondent
- Alfred Bester, literary editor (also novelist, screenwriter, and renowned science fiction writer of The Demolished Man and The Stars My Destination)

== Notable writers and articles ==
- Roger Angell
- Paul Bowles – numerous articles beginning in 1953 for Holiday on Paris and North Africa
- Ludwig Bemelmans – Bemelman’s Italian Holiday, 1961, a collection of essays that first appeared in Holiday
- Gwendolyn Brooks – They Call it Bronzeville in October 1951.
- Shirley Ann Grau (on Galatoire’s in New Orleans)
- Morley Callaghan – on the University of Toronto
- Truman Capote
- John Cheever
- Arthur C. Clarke – Clarke wrote "A Journey to Mars", an article about interplanetary space travel published in March 1953.
- Colette (on love in Paris)
- Alistair Cooke
- Joan Didion – Didion's essays "Notes from a Native Daughter" and "On Keeping A Notebook", initially published in Holiday in 1965 and 1966 respectively, were included in her 1968 book Slouching Towards Bethlehem.
- Lawrence Durrell
- Clifton Fadiman
- William Faulkner (on Mississippi)
- Robert Graves
- Ian Fleming (on eating in London)
- Ernest Hemingway
- Alfred Kazin
- Jack Kerouac
- William Manchester
- Mary McCarthy ("The Vassar Girl")
- John McNulty (on playing piano in a silent-movie theater)
- James Michener
- Arthur Miller — Miller wrote a December 1953 article on his alma mater, the University of Michigan and a March 1955 article about his childhood, "A Boy Grew in Brooklyn". Miller's first article was about his fears of McCarthyism on the University of Michigan campus. Miller learned years after editor Ted Patrick's death that he asked him to write the second article after General Motors threatened to stop advertising if the magazine ever published Miller again.
- Ogden Nash
- Ann Petry (on New York)
- V. S. Pritchett
- William Saroyan (on Fresno)
- Carl Sandburg (on Chicago)
- Budd Schulberg
- Irwin Shaw
- John Steinbeck – Steinbeck wrote the article "'Jalopies I Cursed and Loved" for the July 1954 issue. Along with several articles on France, Steinbeck also published portions of his book Travels with Charley in the July 1961, December 1961, and February 1962 issues.
- James Thurber
- Kenneth Tynan (on Ingrid Bergman)
- Robert Penn Warren (on the Alamo)
- E. B. White ("Here Is New York")

Flannery O'Connor

== Notable artists, illustrators, and photographers ==
- Slim Aarons
- Ludwig Bemelmans
- Henri Cartier-Bresson
- George Giusti
- Edward Gorey
- Al Hirschfeld
- Tom Hollyman
- John Cullen Murphy
- Arnold Newman
- John Rombola
- Arnold Roth
- Richard Saunders
- Fred Siebel
- John Lewis Stage
- Frank Zachary, art director for the magazine
