= Katharine S. White =

American writer and editor (1892–1977)

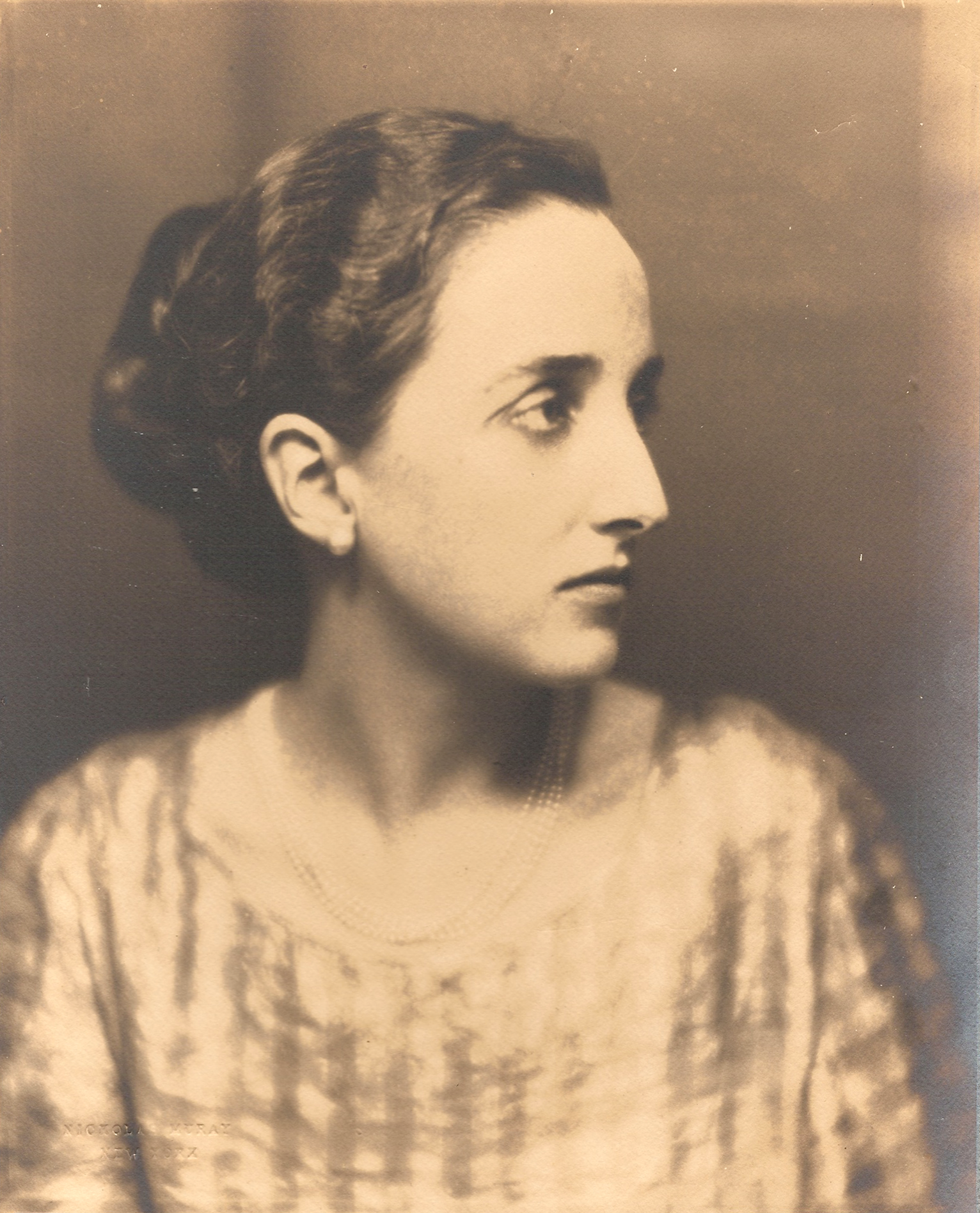
- Born: Katharine Sergeant; September 17, 1892; Winchester, Massachusetts, U.S.
- Died: July 20, 1977 (aged 84); Blue Hill, Maine, U.S.
- Education: Bryn Mawr College
- Occupations: Writer and fiction editor, The New Yorker
- Spouses: Ernest Angell (m. 1915; div. 1929) E. B. White (m. 1929)
- Children: Nancy Angell Stableford; Roger Angell; Joel White

Katharine Sergeant Angell White (born Katharine Sergeant; September 17, 1892 – July 20, 1977) was an American writer and the fiction editor for The New Yorker magazine from 1925 to 1960. In her obituary, printed in The New Yorker in 1977, William Shawn wrote, "More than any other editor except Harold Ross himself, Katharine White gave The New Yorker its shape, and set it on its course."

== Biography ==
Katharine Sergeant was born to Charles Spencer Sergeant and Elizabeth Shepley in Winchester, Massachusetts on September 17, 1892. She had two older sisters, Elizabeth and Rosamund. She grew up in Brookline, Massachusetts at 4 Hawthorn Road. Katharine's sister, Elizabeth Shepley Sergeant, a 1903 graduate of Bryn Mawr College, was also a writer, who wrote books about Willa Cather (a personal friend), poet Robert Frost, and the Pueblo Indians of New Mexico.

Katharine graduated from Bryn Mawr College in 1914. On May 22, 1915, she married Ernest Angell, an attorney and the future president of the ACLU, in Brookline, Massachusetts.

She began working for Harold Ross at The New Yorker in 1925, six months after its inception. She started out reading unsolicited manuscripts for two hours a day, then quickly moved to full-time work. She proved indispensable as an editor, writer, and shaper of the magazine's advertising policy. She was a literate, elegant, and cultivated woman whom James Thurber described as "the fountain and shrine of The New Yorker." The writer and critic Nancy Franklin observed of White's crucial role at The New Yorker, "In some ways, Katharine White's ambitions for the magazine surpassed Ross's: she pushed him to publish serious poetry (while also attempting to keep the flame of light verse alive as the supply of talented practitioners dwindled over the years); she had adventurous tastes, and enlarged the scope of both the magazine's fiction and the factual pieces; and she saw that the magazine's sense of humor, in its writing and in its cartoons, could be raised above the level of a 'comic paper', which is how Ross sometimes referred to his magazine."

Throughout her career at The New Yorker, White proved to be deft at handling fiction, nonfiction, poetry, and "casuals" (the name the magazine gave to humor pieces). She served as The New Yorker's first fiction editor. She edited and helped develop the careers of several significant 20th-century writers, including Vladimir Nabokov, John O'Hara, Mary McCarthy, John Cheever, John Updike, and Ogden Nash.

In 1929, White divorced her husband and married E. B. White, a New Yorker writer, whom she had recommended that Ross hire. They were both back at work at The New Yorker the next day. After this marriage, she became known as Katharine S. White.

She was the mother (from her first marriage) of a daughter, Nancy Angell Stableford, and a son, Roger Angell. Roger Angell spent decades as fiction editor for The New Yorker and was a well-known baseball writer and poet. Her other son, Joel White, was a naval architect and boat-builder who owned Brooklin Boatyard in Brooklin, Maine.

White originally wrote under the name Katharine Sergeant Angell. As Katharine White, her only book, Onward and Upward in the Garden, was published after her death. It is a compilation of her garden articles and journals. Horticulture magazine stated, "Although she never claimed to be more than an amateur, her pieces, especially her famous surveys of garden catalogs, are remarkable for their fierce intelligence and crisp prose." Her husband credited this book project with saving his own life after her death, as it gave him her words every day, and something to work on after she died.

She is also one of the subjects of the book, "Two Gardeners, A Friendship in Letters" edited by Emily Herring Wilson. This is a collection of correspondence between Katharine and Elizabeth Lawrence, another writer recognized as one of America's most important gardeners and garden writers.

== Death ==
After having survived four previous heart attacks, Katharine White died of congestive heart failure at the age of 84 on July 20, 1977. She is buried in Brooklin, Maine, with E.B. White.

She is also one of the subjects of the book, "Two Gardeners, A Friendship in Letters" edited by Emily Herring Wilson. This book is a collection of correspondence between Katharine and Elizabeth Lawrence, an esteemed writer from the South and recognized as one of America's most important gardeners and garden writers.

== Books ==
- Onward and Upward in the Garden, edited, and with an introduction by E. B. White, New York: Farrar, Straus, Giroux, c. 1979.

== Biography ==
Amy Reading's biography of White, The World She Edited, was published by Harper Collins in 2024.
