= E. B. White House =

Historic house in Maine, United States

- U.S. National Register of Historic Places
- Location within Maine Location within the United States
- Location: Bay Road, Brooklin, Maine
- Coordinates: 44°17′39″N 68°33′18″W
- Area: 1 acre (0.40 ha)
- Built: 1795
- Architect: Richard Allen
- NRHP reference No.: 86002467
- Added to NRHP: September 22, 1986

The E. B. White House is a historic house on 511 Bay Road in Brooklin, Maine, United States. This well-preserved 18th-century farmhouse was home for many years to author E. B. White (1899–1985), and is where he wrote a number of his important works. The farm was the inspiration for one of his best-known works, Charlotte's Web. The house was listed on the National Register of Historic Places in 1986.

== Description and history ==
The White House is set on the east side of SR 175, overlooking Allen's Cove at the southern end of Blue Hill Bay on Brooklin's east side. The main house is a 2 1/2-story wood-frame structure, with end chimneys, clapboard siding, and a granite foundation. Its main entrance is centered on the west-facing front, and has a Greek Revival surround, with flanking pilasters and an entablature above. An ell extends to the rear of the house (toward the water), which is connected it to a barn via a narrow hyphen.

The house was built in about 1795 for William Holden by Captain Richard Allen, a local housewright, and is one of the oldest buildings in north Brooklin. This house was purchased in 1933 by E. B. White for use as a summer residence. In 1937 White made alterations to the house so that it could be occupied year-round; the house's chimneys date from this period. White was a noted writer and essayist, writing for The New Yorker and Harper's Magazine, and producing two well-known children's books, Stuart Little and Charlotte's Web, as well as an updated edition of The Elements of Style, a writer's guide. White was awarded the Presidential Medal of Freedom and a Pulitzer Prize for his work.

White was a private person, and did not advertise the location of his home while he was alive. In 1977, he convinced an interviewer to report that "he lives in 'a New England coastal town', somewhere between Nova Scotia and Cuba". The farm on this property was the inspiration for Charlotte's Web.

== See also ==
- National Register of Historic Places listings in Hancock County, Maine
