= Steve Kettmann =

Californian sports and political writer

Steve Kettmann (born in 1962) is a Californian writer known for his political commentary, including New York Times articles like The Californization of U.S. Politics and The Pirate Party Logs a New Politics, and his Santa Cruz Sentinel columns in support of Christine Blasey Ford, such as I Believe Christine Blasey Ford and Thank You, Dr. Ford. He was a vocal and early critic of the presidency of Donald Trump, organizing and leading a live-reading of George Orwell's 1984 at Bookshop Santa Cruz in Northern California as a protest, and writing this cover article, Orwell in the Time of Trump, in the Santa Cruz Free Weekly.

== Biography ==
Kettmann, born in 1962 in San Jose, California, earned a degree in English literature from UC Berkeley in 1985 and then worked for a year in New York as a general-assignment reporter for Newsday covering politics and other subjects.

Kettmann, despite having written on a wide variety of topics, is best known for his work on several baseball books, most recently Baseball Maverick: How Sandy Alderson Revolutionized Baseball and Revived the Mets (Grove Atlantic, April 2015). The book explores Alderson's role as general manager of the Oakland A's in the 1980s and 1990s, including his role as a mentor to the young Billy Beane, who was later made famous in the movie adaption of the Michael Lewis book Moneyball. It also focuses on Alderson's years as general manager of the New York Mets starting in late 2010.

Kettmann was a sportswriter for the San Francisco Chronicle from 1990 to 1999, covering the Oakland A's for four seasons as a beat writer, and has also written on steroids and baseball for numerous publications, becoming one of the first to state openly that Mark McGwire had used steroids in an August 2000 article in The New York Times and appearing on CNN as an expert on the subject. The New Yorker magazine reported in a 2005 article, Dr. Juice, that he was the ghost-writer of José Canseco's book "Juiced," which was a No. 1 New York Times best-seller, despite first being the subject of intense controversy. Some commentators contended that Kettmann's background reporting on steroids and baseball was helpful, with New York Daily News columnist Mike Lupica going so far as to contend, "Canseco was only honest in his first book because his ghost writer, Steve Kettmann, made him be."

Kettmann's first book was "One Day at Fenway," which described a single game between the Boston Red Sox and New York Yankees on August 30, 2003, from a variety of perspectives. That book, nominated for a Quill Award and featured in the Farrelly brothers film "Fever Pitch," generated mostly positive reviews, but ESPN writer Rob Neyer was an outspoken critic.

Previously, Kettmann edited "Game Time," a collection of Roger Angell's baseball writing from the New Yorker spanning forty years. Originally published in early 2003, the book was reviewed on the front page of the New York Times Book Review. "Edited by the sportswriter Steve Kettmann," wrote Joel Conarroe, "the 29 selections could be thought of as 'Roger's Greatest Hits,' except that there is little reason to make distinctions among his scores of writerly four-baggers."

Kettmann has reported from more than 40 countries for publications including The New York Times, the Los Angeles Times, The New Republic, Foreign Policy, the Washington Monthly, GQ, Parade, The Village Voice, Salon.com and Wired.com, the Berliner Zeitung, Die Welt and Der Spiegel. From 1999 to 2012 he was based primarily in Berlin and from 2000 to 2001 wrote a weekly column for the Berliner Zeitung newspaper as an American in Berlin, appearing every Wednesday. A 1999 Arthur F. Burns Fellow, he speaks German as well as some Spanish.

His past books include "What a Party!" co-written with then-current Virginia Governor Terry McAuliffe, which debuted in February 2007 at No. 5 on New York Times best-seller list, and "Letter to a New President," co-written with Senator Robert Byrd of West Virginia, published in June 2008, book-length advice to whoever would follow George W. Bush. In an interview with The Hill newspaper in Washington, Kettmann described how he and Byrd worked on the book and said, "To him, history is a living, breathing presence in his life that he consults often, like a good friend that is always at his side."
