= Mark C. Zauderer =

American lawyer

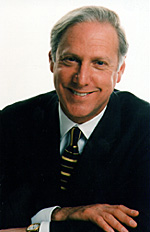
- Mark C. Zauderer
- Education: Union College, B.A. New York University; School of Law, J.D.
- Occupation: Lawyer
- Employer(s): Dorf Nelson & Zauderer LLP
- Known for: Trial and appellate advocacy Bar leader Media legal commentary

Mark C. Zauderer is a New York trial and appellate lawyer, and a senior partner in the New York law firm of Dorf Nelson & Zauderer LLP. He frequently comments on legal issues in the print and television media and lectures on litigation-related issues.

== Early life and education ==
Zauderer was raised in Brooklyn, New York and is a graduate of the Brooklyn Friends School. He is a 1967 graduate of Union College, where he was awarded a Bachelor of Arts with Distinction and Departmental Honors. Union College recognized Zauderer's legal career in 2007 by awarding him the Eliphalet Nott Medal for alumni achievement.

In 1971, Zauderer received a Juris Doctor degree from New York University School of Law.

== Professional history ==
From 1971-1972, Zauderer served as the law clerk to the Judge Robert Shaw, United States District Court for the District of New Jersey. In 1981, he co-founded the law firm of Solomon, Zauderer, Ellenhorn, Frischer & Sharp. In 2005, he joined Flemming Zulack Williamson Zauderer LLP, where he remained until 2018, when he joined Ganfer Shore Leeds & Zauderer LLP. In 2023, Zauderer joined the litigation department of the firm of Dorf Nelson & Zauderer LLP.

Zauderer has served as the lead trial lawyer in many significant business litigations. He litigated the successful appeal of a seminal case defining the extent of the extraterritorial application of the U.S. Securities Laws.

Zauderer served as defense co-counsel in a suit brought by Eliot Spitzer, who was at the time the attorney general of New York state, against the former chief of the New York Stock Exchange, Richard Grasso, to recover Grasso's allegedly improper $187.5 million pay package. All claims against Grasso were eventually dismissed.

Zauderer has frequently represented major law firms in complex litigations and trials involving breach of fiduciary claims by former partners, and in significant malpractice matters. In 2010, he obtained a dismissal of a $500 million malpractice suit against the international law firm of Chadbourne & Parke. In 2012, Zauderer represented a group of 57 former partners from the failed law firm of Dewey & LeBoeuf LLP in a highly publicized bankruptcy proceeding seeking to claw back pay and other benefits from the former partners. In 2015, he was appointed a referee with all the powers of the New York Supreme Court, to adjudicate all disputes between the partners of the national law firm Napoli Bern, and to oversee the dissolution of the firm and transition of its 24,000 clients.

Zauderer represented former Clinton administration cabinet member Ronald Brown, at the time the United States Secretary of Commerce, in a lawsuit brought against him and the major television networks by former presidential candidate Eugene McCarthy. McCarthy alleged that Brown, former chair of the Democratic National Committee, had improperly excluded him and others from the televised 1992 presidential debates. The claims against Brown were dismissed.

Zauderer is a director of the New York International Arbitration Center and a member of the American Arbitration Association's National Roster of Commercial Arbitrators.

== Public service ==
Zauderer is a past president of the Federal Bar Council and is a member of the Board of Editors of the New York Law Journal. In 2003, he was appointed by New York's then Chief Judge, Judith S. Kaye, as chair of New York's Commission on the Jury, a blue-ribbon panel of lawyers and judges charged with finding ways to improve New York State's jury system. In 2004, after holding public hearings, the Commission issued a lengthy report recommending significant improvements to New York State's Jury system. In 2005, at the request of Chief Judge Kaye, Zauderer conducted town hall meetings in the New York Court of Appeals and courts throughout New York State to engage high school students in a dialog on the American jury system. He also served as a member of the Chief Judge's Commercial Courts Task Force, which implemented the establishment of the New York State Court System's Commercial Division, and as a member of the Office of Court Administration's Program on the Profession and the Courts, which drafted New York's current sanctions rules. In 2012, Zauderer was appointed by New York Chief Judge Jonathan Lippman as a member of the Task Force on Commercial Litigation in the 21st Century. In 2013, he was appointed by New York Chief Judge Lippman as a member of the permanent Advisory Committee of the Commercial Division of the New York State Supreme Court.

In 1991, then New York Chief Judge Sol Wachtler chose Zauderer as lead trial counsel in the New York Judiciary's constitutional lawsuit against the Governor of New York and New York State Legislature to secure adequate funding for New York's Judiciary. The case was successfully resolved just prior to trial.

In 2004, Zauderer served as a member of a four-person delegation to the Chief Justice of the Supreme Court of the Organization of Eastern Caribbean States to advise on the establishment of a commercial court for nine former or present British territories.

In 2015, Zauderer was honored by the New York Law Journal with its award for his contributions to public service.

Zauderer is a past chair of the Commercial and Federal Litigation Section of the New York State Bar Association, served as a delegate to its House of Delegates, as a member of the Special Committee on Cameras in the Courts, and chaired the Association's Steering Committee on Commerce and Industry. He has served as a member of the Committee on the Judiciary, the Committee on Professional Responsibility, and the Committee on State Courts of Superior Jurisdiction of the Association of the Bar of the City of New York.

Zauderer currently serves as a member of Governor Kathy Hochul's Judicial Screening Committee for the Appellate Division, First Department and a member of the Chief Administrative Judge's Advisory Committee on Civil Practice. In 2015, New York's Chief Judge appointed Zauderer to the new Commission on Statewide Attorney Discipline, made up of leading attorneys and judges in New York State.

In 2026, Zauderer's memoir, Counsel, the Courtroom Is Open, was published by Post Hill Press and distributed by Simon & Schuster.

== Honors and awards ==
Union College recognized Zauderer's legal career in 2007 by awarding him the Eliphalet Nott Medal for alumni achievement.

In 2015, Zauderer was honored by the New York Law Journal with its award for "Lawyers Who Lead By Example" for his contributions to public service.

On May 29, 2016, Zauderer delivered the Commencement Address at Touro Law School and was awarded an honorary Doctor of Laws degree.

== Teaching ==
Zauderer has taught trial advocacy and related skills to practicing lawyers for the Federal Bar Council, New York State Bar Association, and the Practising Law Institute, and has served on a panelist on many legal topics, including libel tourism for the American Enterprise Institute and the 2011 Second Circuit Judicial Conference, "The Legal Brain-scape: Neuroscience and the Law". In 2013 Zauderer served as moderator of the Practising Law Institute's program, "Judges' Pet Peeves: Tips from the Bench on Trial Practice".

== Media ==
Zauderer has been the subject of eight half-hour interviews on the PBS television program, "The Open Mind" including:

- "The Jury System on Trial"
- "Forcing Lawyers to Retire"
- "The Law, Fitting a Profession Into The Business Model"
- "A Newer Look At Cameras in the Courts"
- "On Lawyers, Judges and Justice in America"
- "The Legal Brain-Scape: Neuroscience and the Law"
- "A New York Times Editorial, 5/7/2012: The Cautionary Tale of Dewey & LeBoeuf"
- "In The Name of the Law …".

He frequently comments on legal issues in the print and television media and lectures on litigation related issues.
