= Slim Aarons =

American photographer

- Born: George Allen Aarons; October 29, 1916; New York City, U.S.
- Died: May 30, 2006 (aged 89); Montrose, New York, U.S.
- Known for: Photography
- Spouse: Lorita Dewart (m. 1951)
- Military career
- Allegiance: United States
- Branch: United States Army
- Conflicts: World War II
- Awards: Purple Heart

Slim Aarons (born George Allen Aarons; October 29, 1916 – May 30, 2006) was an American photographer noted for his images of socialites, jet-setters and celebrities. His work principally appeared in Life, Town & Country, and Holiday magazines.

== Early life ==
Aarons was born to Yiddish-speaking immigrants who had lived in a tenement on Manhattan’s Lower East Side. His father, Charlie Aarons (born Susman Aronowicz), distanced himself from the family; his mother, Stella Karvetzky, was sent to a sanitarium. Not knowing what had become of his parents, Aarons spent his boyhood, at varying times, with an aunt, at an orphanage, and with his grandmother and cousins in New Hampshire.

== Photography career ==
At 18 years old, Aarons enlisted in the United States Army, worked as a photographer at the United States Military Academy, and later served as a combat photographer, in World War II, and earned a Purple Heart. Aarons said combat had taught him the only beach worth landing on was "decorated with beautiful, seminude girls tanning in a tranquil sun."

After the war, Aarons moved to California and began photographing celebrities. In California, he shot his most praised photo, Kings of Hollywood, a 1957 New's Year's Eve photograph depicting Clark Gable, Van Heflin, Gary Cooper, and James Stewart relaxing at a bar in full formal wear.

Aarons never used a stylist or a makeup artist. He made his career out of what he called "photographing attractive people, doing attractive things, in attractive places." An oft-cited example of this approach is his 1970 Poolside Gossip shot at the Kaufmann Desert House designed by Richard Neutra, with owner Nelda Linsk as one of the models in the photo. "I knew everyone," he said, in an interview with The (London) Independent, in 2002. "They would invite me to one of their parties, because they knew I wouldn't hurt them. I was one of them." Alfred Hitchcock's film, Rear Window (1954), whose main character is a photographer played by Jimmy Stewart, is set in an apartment reputed to be based on Aarons' apartment.

In 1997, Mark Getty, the co-founder of Getty Images, visited Aarons in his home and bought Aarons' entire archive.

In 2017, filmmaker Fritz Mitchell released a documentary about Aarons, called Slim Aarons: The High Life. In the documentary, it is revealed that Aarons was Jewish and grew up in conditions that were in complete contrast to what he told friends and family of his childhood. Aarons claimed that he was raised in New Hampshire, was an orphan, and had no living relations. After his death in 2006, his widow and daughter learned the truth that Aarons had grown up in a poor immigrant Yiddish-speaking family on the Lower East Side of Manhattan. When he was a boy, his mother was diagnosed with mental health issues and admitted to a psychiatric hospital which caused him to be passed around among relatives. He resented and had no relationship with his father and had a brother Harry, who would later commit suicide. Several documentary interviewees postulate that if Aarons's true origins had been known, his career would have been unlikely to succeed within the restricted world of celebrity and WASP privilege his photography glamorized.

== Death ==
Aarons died, in 2006, in Montrose, New York, and was buried in Mount Auburn Cemetery, which is located in Cambridge, Massachusetts.

== Bibliography ==
- Aarons, Slim (1974). A Wonderful Time: An Intimate Portrait of the Good Life. Harper and Row. ISBN 978-0060100162.
- Aarons, Slim (2003). Slim Aarons: Once Upon A Time. Harry N. Abrams. ISBN 978-0810946033.
- Aarons, Slim; Sweet, Christopher (2005). Slim Aarons: A Place in the Sun. Harry N. Abrams. ISBN 978-0810959354.
- Aarons, Slim (2007). Poolside With Slim Aarons. Harry N. Abrams. ISBN 978-0810994072.
- Aarons, Slim; Sweet, Christopher (2012). Slim Aarons: La Dolce Vita (Getty Images). Harry N. Abrams. ISBN 978-1419700606.
- Aarons, Slim (2016). Slim Aarons: Women. Harry N. Abrams. ISBN 978-1419722424.

== Exhibitions ==
Aarons' exhibitions include

- 2014 - Slim Aarons: A Man for All Seasons, Staley-Wise Gallery, New York, USA (solo)
- 2008 - The Good Life, Yancey Richardson Gallery, New York, USA
- 2007 - The show on Vegas, M+B, Los Angeles, USA
- 2006 - Slim Aarons-the lost world, Torch Gallery, Amsterdam, The Netherlands (solo)
- 2005 - From the Source, Fashion Photographs, Corkin Gallery, Toronto, Canada
- 2004 - Pool Party, Yossi Milo Gallery, New York, USA
- 2003 - Slim Aarons - Once Upon A Time, Staley-Wise, New York, USA (solo)
- 1995 - Slim Aarons, Candace Dwan Gallery, Katonah, USA (solo)
