= E. B. White =

American author (1899–1985)

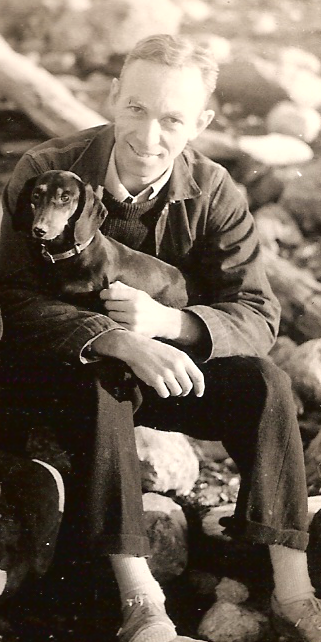
- White on the beach with his dachshund Minnie
- Born: Elwyn Brooks White; July 11, 1899; Mount Vernon, New York, U.S.
- Died: October 1, 1985 (aged 86); Brooklin, Maine, U.S.
- Resting place: Brooklin Cemetery, Brooklin, Maine, U.S.
- Education: Cornell University (BA)
- Occupation: Writer
- Spouse: Katharine Sergeant (m. 1929; died 1977)
- Children: Joel White

Elwyn Brooks White (July 11, 1899 – October 1, 1985) was an American writer, essayist, and a contributing editor for The New Yorker magazine. He was also the author of highly popular books for children: Stuart Little (1945), Charlotte's Web (1952), and The Trumpet of the Swan (1970).

In a 2012 survey of School Library Journal readers, Charlotte's Web was ranked first in their poll of the top one hundred children's novels. White was co-author of The Elements of Style, an English language style guide. Kurt Vonnegut called White "one of the most admirable prose stylists our country has so far produced."

== Early life, family and education ==
White was born in Mount Vernon, New York, on July 11, 1899, the sixth and youngest child of Samuel Tilly White, the president of a piano firm, and Jessie Hart White, the daughter of Scottish-American painter William Hart. Elwyn's older brother Stanley Hart White, known as Stan, a professor of landscape architecture and the inventor of the vertical garden, taught E. B. White to read and explore the natural world.

White attended Cornell University, where he was briefly a private in the Student Army Training Corps (SATC), created by the US Department of War in 1918 to hasten the training of US soldiers for World War I in Europe. Students continued to take college courses while training for the army. Unlike the Reserve Officers' Training Corps (ROTC), SATC students were required to live and take all meals on campus and adhered to a strict military schedule of study and training. They also required a pass to go off campus on weekends. Following the end of World War I, the SATC program was disbanded in December 1918, and White did not serve with the active armed forces.

In 1921, White graduated from Cornell University with a Bachelor of Arts degree. At Cornell, he obtained the nickname "Andy", where tradition confers that moniker on any male student whose surname is White after Cornell co-founder Andrew Dickson White. He worked as editor of The Cornell Daily Sun with classmate Allison Danzig, who later became a sportswriter for The New York Times. As a Cornell University student, White was a member of Aleph Samach, Quill and Dagger, and Phi Gamma Delta fraternity.

== Career ==
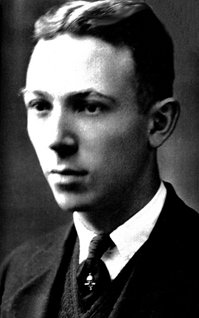
White at age 21

After graduating from Cornell, White went to work for the United Press, later United Press International, and the American Legion News Service in 1921 and 1922. From September 1922 to June 1923, he was a cub reporter for The Seattle Times. On one occasion, when White was stuck writing a story, a Times editor said, "Just say the words."

White was fired from the Times and later wrote for the rival Seattle Post-Intelligencer before a stint in Alaska on a fireboat. He then worked for almost two years with the Frank Seaman advertising agency as a production assistant and copywriter before returning to New York City in 1924.

In 1925, after The New Yorker was founded, White began submitting manuscripts to the magazine. Katharine Angell, the literary editor, recommended to editor-in-chief and founder Harold Ross that White be hired as a staff writer. However, it took months to convince White to attend a meeting at the office and additional weeks to convince him to work on the premises. He eventually agreed to work in the office on Thursdays.

White published his first article for The New Yorker in 1925, then joined the staff in 1927 and continued to write for the magazine for nearly six decades. Best recognized for his essays and unsigned "Notes and Comment" pieces, he gradually became the magazine's most important contributor. From the beginning to the end of his career at The New Yorker, he frequently provided what the magazine calls "Newsbreaks", which were short, witty comments on oddly worded printed items from many sources, under various categories, such as "Block That Metaphor." In his essays, he advocated in favor of limited government, civil rights, and especially world federalism. He also was a columnist for Harper's Magazine from 1938 to 1943.

In 1929, White coauthored with James Thurber on Is Sex Necessary? In 1949, White published Here Is New York, a short book based on an article he had been commissioned to write for Holiday. Editor Ted Patrick approached White about writing the essay, telling him it would be fun. "Writing is never 'fun'", White replied. That article reflects the writer's appreciation of a city that provides its residents with both "the gift of loneliness and the gift of privacy." It concludes with a dark note touching on the forces that could destroy the city that he loved. This prescient "love letter" to the city was re-published in 1999 on his centennial with an introduction by his stepson, Roger Angell.

In 1959, White edited and updated The Elements of Style. This handbook of grammatical and stylistic guidance for writers of American English was first written and published in 1918 by William Strunk Jr., one of White's professors at Cornell. White's reworking of the book was extremely well received, and later editions followed in 1972, 1979, and 1999. Maira Kalman illustrated an edition in 2005. That same year, Nico Muhly, a New York City composer, premiered a short opera based on the book. The volume is a standard tool for students and writers and remains required reading in many composition classes. The complete history of The Elements of Style is detailed in Mark Garvey's Stylized: A Slightly Obsessive History of Strunk & White's The Elements of Style.

In 1978, White was awarded a special Pulitzer Prize, citing "his letters, essays and the full body of his work". He also received the Presidential Medal of Freedom in 1963 and honorary memberships in a variety of literary societies throughout the United States. The 1973 Oscar-nominated Canadian animated short The Family That Dwelt Apart was narrated by White and was based on his short story of the same name.

=== Children's books ===
In the late 1930s, White turned his hand to children's fiction on behalf of a niece, Janice Hart White. His first children's book, Stuart Little, was published in 1945, and Charlotte's Web followed in 1952. Stuart Little initially received a lukewarm welcome from the literary community. However, both books went on to receive high acclaim, and Charlotte's Web won a Newbery Honor from the American Library Association, though it lost out on winning the Newbery Medal to Secret of the Andes by Ann Nolan Clark.

White received the Laura Ingalls Wilder Medal from the U.S. professional children's librarians in 1970. It recognized his "substantial and lasting contributions to children's literature." That year, he was also the U.S. nominee and eventual runner-up for the biennial Hans Christian Andersen Award, as he was again in 1976. Also in 1970, White's third children's novel was published, The Trumpet of the Swan. In 1973 it won the Sequoyah Award from Oklahoma and the William Allen White Award from Kansas, both selected by students voting for their favorite book of the year. In 2012, the School Library Journal sponsored a survey of readers, which identified Charlotte's Web as the best children's novel ("fictional title for readers 8–12" years old). The librarian who conducted it said, "It is impossible to conduct a poll of this sort and expect [White's novel] to be anywhere but #1."

== Awards and honors ==
- 1953 Newbery Honor for Charlotte's Web
- 1960 American Academy of Arts and Letters Gold Medal
- 1963 Presidential Medal of Freedom
- 1970 Laura Ingalls Wilder Award
- 1971 National Medal for Literature
- 1977 L. L. Winship/PEN New England Award, Letters of E. B. White
- 1978 Pulitzer Prize Special Citation for Letters

== Personal life ==
White was shy around women, claiming he had "too small a heart, too large a pen". But in 1929, after an affair that led to Katharine Angell's divorce, she and White were married. They had a son, Joel White, a naval architect and boat builder, who later owned Brooklin Boat Yard in Brooklin, Maine. Katharine's son from her first marriage, Roger Angell, spent decades as a fiction editor for The New Yorker and was well known as the magazine's baseball writer.

In her foreword to Charlotte's Web, Kate DiCamillo quotes White as saying, "All that I hope to say in books, all that I ever hope to say, is that I love the world."

James Thurber described White as a quiet man who disliked publicity and who, during his time at The New Yorker, would slip out of his office via the fire escape to a nearby branch of Schrafft's to avoid visitors he did not know:

Most of us, out of a politeness made up of faint curiosity and profound resignation, go out to meet the smiling stranger with a gesture of surrender and a fixed grin, but White has always taken to the fire escape. He has avoided the Man in the Reception Room as he has avoided the interviewer, the photographer, the microphone, the rostrum, the literary tea, and the Stork Club. His life is his own. He is the only writer of prominence I know of who could walk through the Algonquin lobby or between the tables at Jack and Charlie's and be recognized only by his friends.

— James Thurber, E.B.W., "Credos and Curios"

Later in life, White developed Alzheimer's disease. He died on October 1, 1985, at his farm home in North Brooklin, Maine. He is buried in the Brooklin Cemetery beside Katharine, who died in 1977.

== Legacy ==
The E. B. White Read Aloud Award is given by The Association of Booksellers for Children (ABC) to honor books that its membership feel embodies the universal read-aloud standards that E. B. White's works created.

The Division of Rare and Manuscript Collections at Cornell University Library holds the E. B. White Collection, an archive of manuscripts, letters, photographs, cassette tapes regarding E. B. White, including over 25,000 letters sent to him. For example, when Late Night show host Conan O'Brien reminisced about the return letter he received from E. B. White after writing him a letter at the age of 16, Cornell's Olin Library found that letter for him. During the 2025 Palisades Fire, O'Brien recalled that when he was told to evacuate, his wife asked what to grab, and he replied, "Just grab the E. B. White letter off the wall."

White was played by Patrick Kennedy in Blue Moon, Richard Linklater's 2025 biopic of musical writer Lorenz Hart.

== Bibliography ==
=== Books ===
- Less than Nothing, or, The Life and Times of Sterling Finny (1927)
- White, E. B. (1929). The Lady Is Cold: poems by E.B.W. New York: Harper and Brothers.
- Thurber, James; White, E. B. (1929). Is Sex Necessary? Or, Why You Feel the Way You Do. New York: Harper & Brothers. LCCN 29027938.
- Ho Hum: Newsbreaks from The New Yorker (1931). Intro by E. B. White, and much of the text as well.
- Alice Through the Cellophane, John Day (1933)
- Every Day Is Saturday, Harper (1934)
- Farewell to Model T (1936, G P Putnam's Sons) - originally published under pseudonym Lee Strout White as Farewell, My Lovely! (1936, The New Yorker) collaboration with Richard L. Strout
- The Fox of Peapack, and other poems (1938, Harper)
- Quo Vadimus?: or The Case for the Bicycle, Harper (1938)
- A Subtreasury of American Humor (1941). Co-edited with Katharine S. White.
- One Man's Meat (1942): A collection of his columns from Harper's Magazine
- The Wild Flag: Editorials from The New Yorker on Federal World Government and Other Matters (1943)
- Stuart Little (1945)
- Here Is New York (1949)
- Charlotte's Web (1952)
- The Second Tree from the Corner (1954)
- The Elements of Style (by William Strunk Jr. in 1918, revised and expanded by White in 1959)
- The Points of My Compass (1962)
- An E. B. White Reader (1966, Ed. William W. Watt and Robert W. Bradford)
- The Trumpet of the Swan (1970)
- Letters of E. B. White (1976)
- Essays of E. B. White (1977)
- Poems and Sketches of E. B. White (1981)
- Writings from The New Yorker 1925-1976 (1990, HarperCollins, ed. Rebecca M. Dale)
- Farewell to Model T / From Sea to Shining Sea (2003, Little Bookroom)
- In the Words of E. B. White (2011)

=== Essays and reporting ===
- E.B.W. (April 18, 1925). "A Step Forward". The New Yorker. Vol. 1, no. 9. p. 21.
- — (May 9, 1925). "Defense of the Bronx River". The New Yorker. Vol. 1, no. 12. p. 14.
- — (1941). "Once More to the Lake". Harper's Magazine.
