= Beth Eden Chapel =

Historic church in Maine, United States

- U.S. National Register of Historic Places
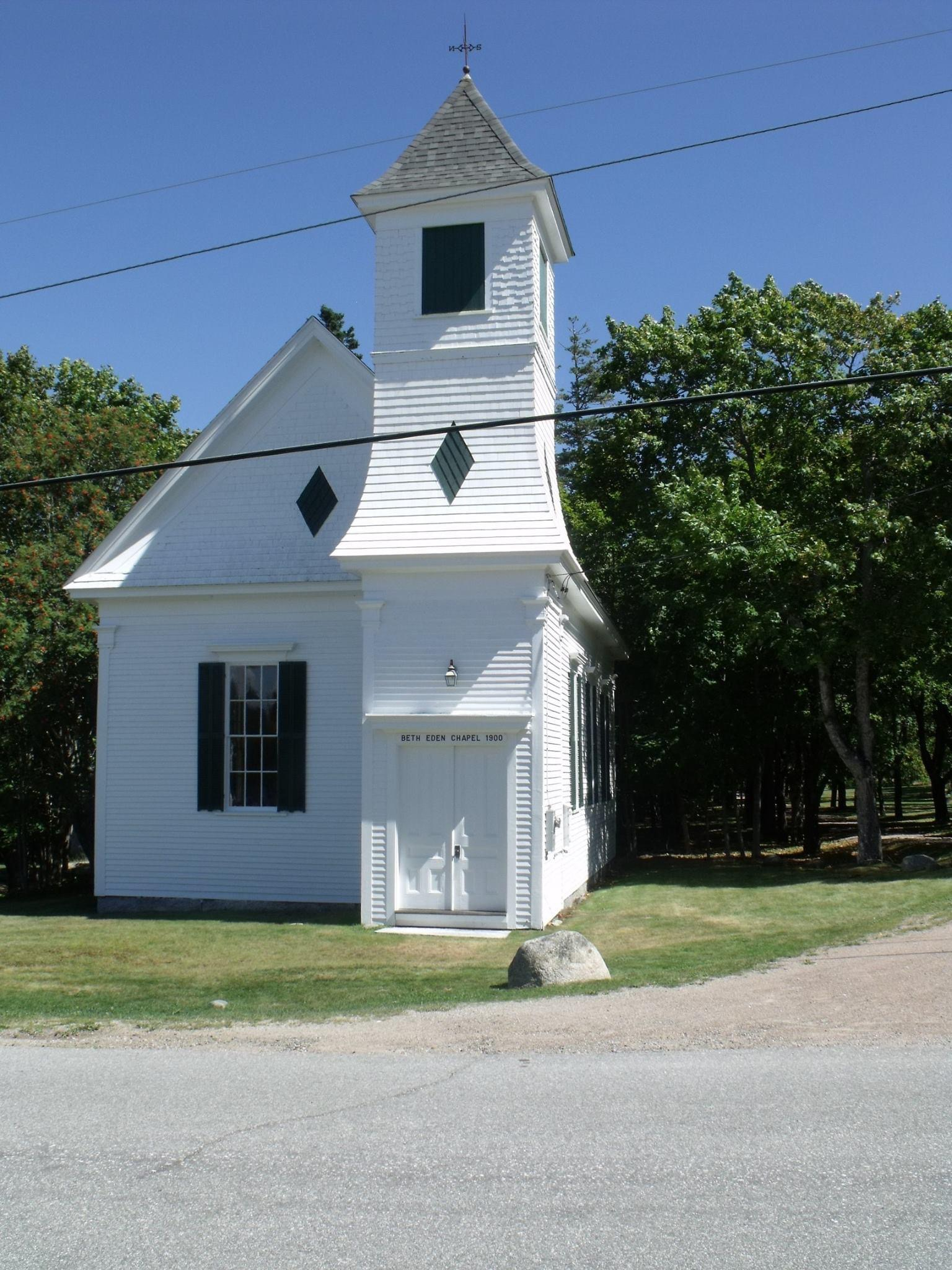

- Location within Maine Location within the United States
- Location: Naskeag Point Rd., .05 mi. N of jct. with Naskeag Loop Rd., Brooklin, Maine
- Nearest city: Brooklin, Maine
- Coordinates: 44°14′05″N 068°31′58″W
- Area: less than one acre
- Built: 1900
- NRHP reference No.: 01000818
- Added to NRHP: August 2, 2001

The Beth Eden Chapel is a historic church near the junction of Naskeag Point Road and Stubbs Drive in Brooklin, Maine. Built in 1900, this Late Victorian wood-frame church was the first to be built in the Naskeag Point area. Although it was built by a Methodist congregation, it was open to the use of all denominations. The building was listed on the National Register of Historic Places in 2001.

== Description and history ==
The Beth Eden Chapel is a modest single-story wood-frame structure, with a gable roof, clapboard and shingle siding, and a granite foundation. A square tower housing the entrance and a belfry projects from the right front of the building. The front-facing gable end and the second stage of the tower share design features, notably a decorative diamond and a flaring of the siding. The third stage of the tower houses the belfry, and is decorated with wave-cut shingles. The tower is capped with a pyramidal roof and finial. The building's corners are decorated with pilasters, and its side elevations are uniformly three bays with windows. The sanctuary inside has a coved plaster ceiling.

The church was apparently built in 1900 on land acquired by the trustees of the local Methodist congregation in 1884. Deeds note that a building already stood on the land; it is not clear if any part of this building is a surviving element of the earlier structure. The church was consecrated in December 1900 for use by any Christian denomination. The church is one of three historic churches in Brooklin, and is the only one with distinctive late Victorian architecture.

== See also ==
- National Register of Historic Places listings in Hancock County, Maine
