= Goddard Site =

- U.S. National Register of Historic Places
- Nearest city: Brooklin, Maine
- Area: 2 acres (0.81 ha)
- NRHP reference No.: 79000132
- Added to NRHP: May 7, 1979

The Goddard Site is a prehistoric archaeological site in Brooklin, Maine. The site is notable for the large number of stone artifacts found, most of which were sourced at locations well removed from the area, and for the presence of worked copper artifacts. It is most widely known as the claimed location at which the Maine penny, a Norse coin dating to the reign of Olaf Kyrre (1067–1093 AD), was found. The site was listed on the National Register of Historic Places in 1979.

== Description ==
The Goddard Site is located on Naskeag Point, the southernmost peninsula of Brooklin, Maine, which is located on the Blue Hill Peninsula west of Mount Desert Island on the central coast of Maine. The site offers an unobstructed view of the surrounding waters and islands, and was apparently a major summer encampment and trading site. Unlike other coastal sites in Maine, there is a marked absence of shell middens, and a large number of artifacts have been recovered from the site that originate all across the larger region. Finds include pottery remnants of a sort usually found as far off as New Jersey and Nova Scotia. The site also included a series of post molds 13 metres (43 ft) in length, probably the location of a longhouse.

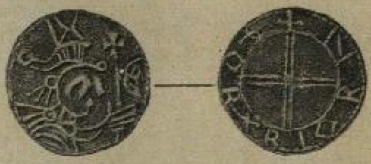
A coin similar to the Maine penny

Unusual finds at the site include worked copper, including some of European origin that were found in a Late Ceramic period grave of two children, alongside clay artifacts. The most unusual find, however, is the Maine penny, a silver coin of Norse origin, dating to the reign of Olaf Kyrre (1067–1093 AD). Speculation has it that this coin would have been brought to the site by Native traders, since it post-dates the abandonment of the only known Norse settlements in North America. However, the provenance of this coin, claimed to have been found at the site by an amateur archaeologist and old coin collector, is now disputed. While there is no argument about the coin itself being authentic, scholarly debate continues about its actual discovery. Archaeologist Dr. Edmund Carpenter, having exposed the "Viking treasure" for decades prominently displayed in the Royal Ontario Museum as a hoax, raised similar concerns with respect to the Norse penny and concluded: "Not proven." The site has shown no evidence of other Norse artifacts. Over 10 years later, after more complex evidence of Norse contact in the Americas, however, the numismatist Svein Gullbekk suggested that it was very unlikely a coin of this type (Stenersen class N) could have been acquired to be placed at the site and, thus, concluded "the presence of Norse people on the northeastern coast of mainland America is no longer in doubt [...] that one such coin was found in America, beyond what is known of the geography of the Norse medieval communities, cannot simply be ruled out at as a hoax."

== See also ==
- National Register of Historic Places listings in Hancock County, Maine
