= MPA – the Association of Magazine Media =

Trade association for the magazine industry

MPA – The Association of Magazine Media was a nonprofit trade association for the magazine media industry. MPA was formerly known as Magazine Publishers Association until 2010. In 2022, MPA was merged into the main trade association for American daily newspapers, the News Media Alliance (previously the Newspaper Association of America). As a result of the merger, the News Media Alliance added a slash to its name, becoming the News/Media Alliance.

MPA was the industry trade association for multi-platform magazine media companies. Established in 1919, MPA represented 175 domestic magazine media companies with more than 900 titles, approximately 30 international companies, and more than 100 associate members. Staffed by magazine media specialists, MPA was headquartered in New York City, with a government affairs office in Washington, D.C.

MPA held an annual conference, known as AMMC or the American Magazine Media Conference, for magazine media professionals. During the conference, media professionals discussed the future of the magazine media industry, both print and digital, including challenges and opportunities.

The July 2022 merger with the News Media Alliance created "a nonprofit organization representing more than 2,000 news and magazine media organizations and their multiplatform businesses in the United States and globally."

== Publishers Information Bureau ==
MPA administered the Publishers Information Bureau (PIB), which released consumer magazine advertising data on a monthly basis. PIB data was a trusted source of data for many news organizations, and was used to report on the state of the consumer magazine industry.
