= Brooklin, Maine =

Town in Maine, United States

- Town
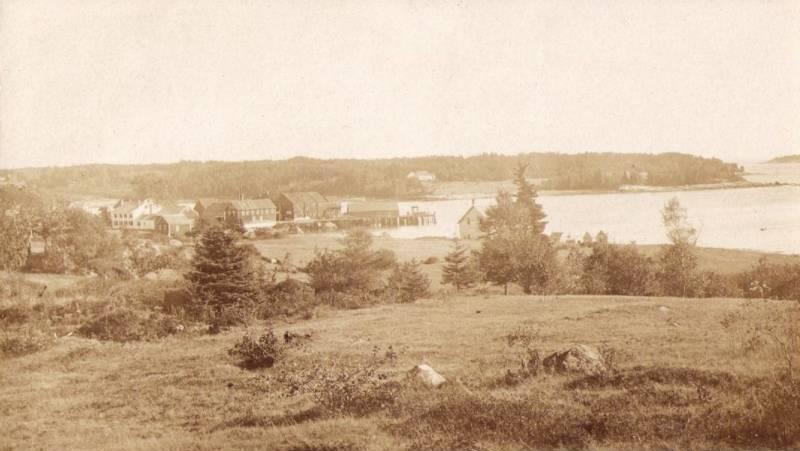
- Center Harbor in 1909

- Seal

- Location within Maine Location within the United States
- Coordinates: 44°16′31″N 68°33′34″W
- Country: United States
- State: Maine
- County: Hancock
- Incorporated: 1849
- Villages: Brooklin; Haven; Naskeag; North Brooklin; West Brooklin

Area
  - Total: 41.18 sq mi (106.66 km^{2})
  - Land: 17.92 sq mi (46.41 km^{2})
  - Water: 23.26 sq mi (60.24 km^{2})
- Elevation: 03 ft (0.91 m)

Population (2020)
  - Total: 827
  - Density: 46/sq mi (17.8/km^{2})
- Time zone: UTC-5 (Eastern (EST))
  - Summer (DST): UTC-4 (EDT)
- ZIP code: 04616
- Area code: 207
- FIPS code: 23-07800
- GNIS feature ID: 582370
- Website: www.brooklinmaine.com

Brooklin is a town in Hancock County, Maine, United States. The population was 827 at the 2020 census.

== History ==
Brooklin was originally part the larger town of Sedgwick. Brooklin broke off and formed its own town in 1849. A few weeks later, the name was changed to Brooklin, after the brook line which separated it from Sedgwick. Using pogie oil as a fertilizer, the difficult soil was made productive, and hay became the principal crop. With excellent harbors, however, the main occupations were fishing and seafaring. By 1859, when the population was 1,002, it also had five boot and shoemaking factories, as well as two barrel manufacturers. By 1886, the town was noted for producing smoked herring in considerable quantities. Canning lobster had also become an important business.

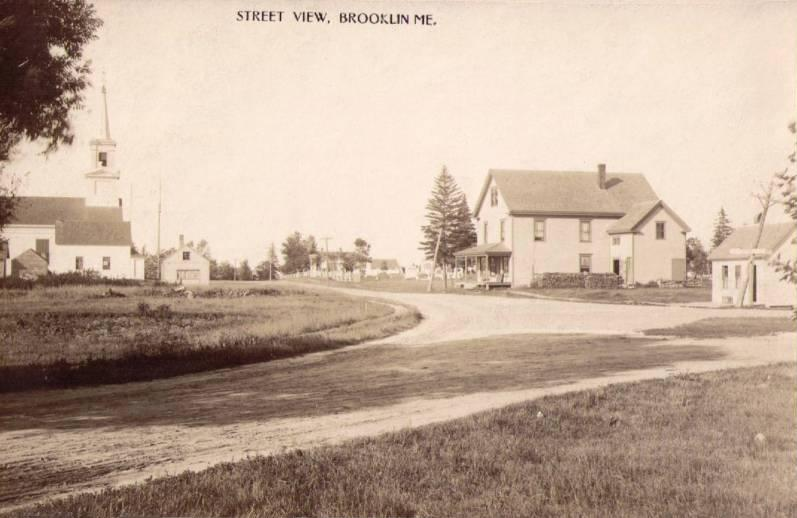
Street view in 1909

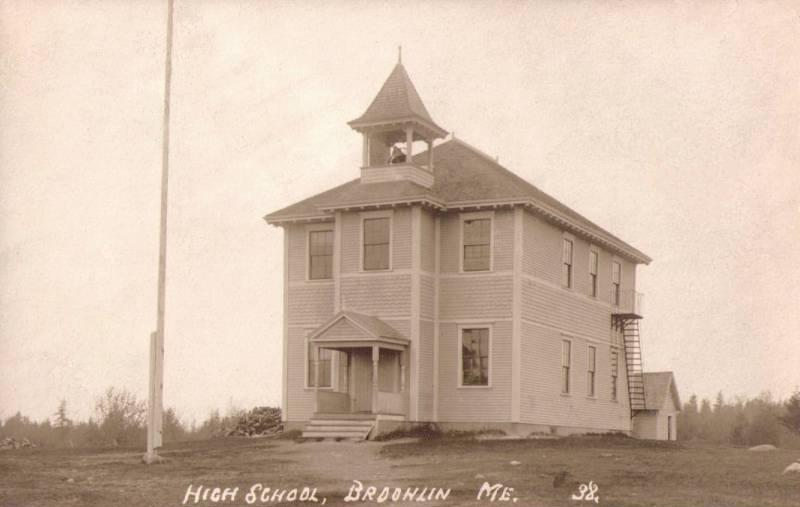
Old High School c. 1915

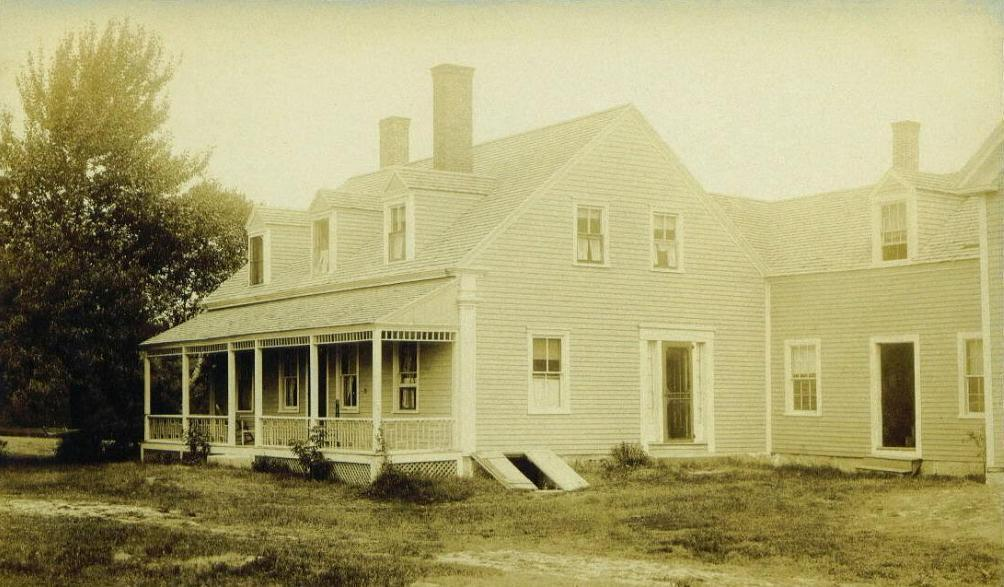
Redman Cottage in 1909

== Geography ==
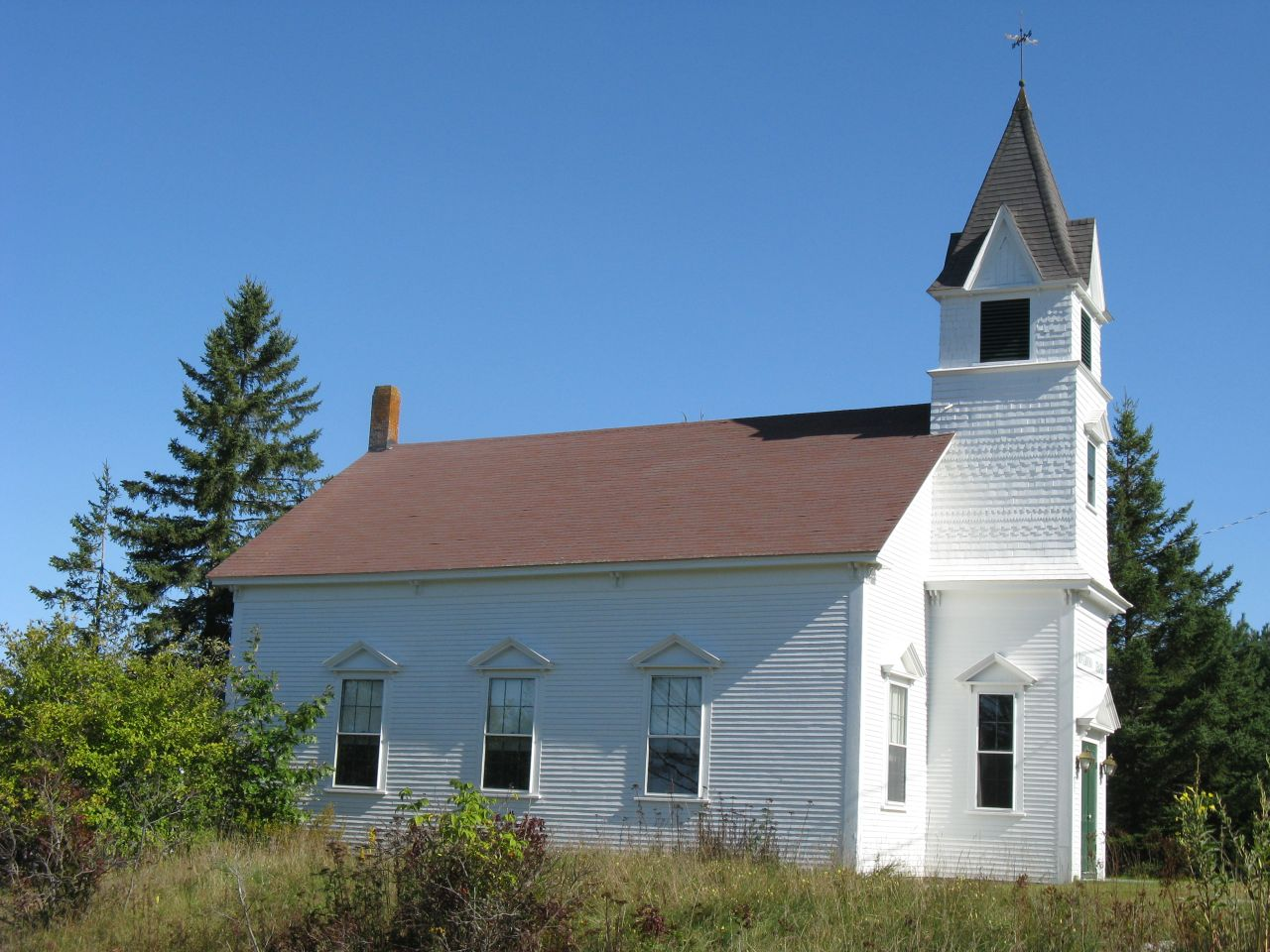
Rockbound Chapel, completed in 1902

According to the United States Census Bureau, the town has a total area of 41.18 square miles (106.66 km^{2}), of which 17.92 square miles (46.41 km^{2}) is land and 23.26 square miles (60.24 km^{2}) is water. Brooklin is situated on the Eggemoggin Reach, Blue Hill Bay and the Benjamin River, which are part of Penobscot Bay.

The town is crossed by Maine State Route 175.

== Demographics ==
Historical population
Census	Pop.	Note	%±
1850	1,002		—
1860	1,043		4.1%
1870	966		−7.4%
1880	977		1.1%
1890	1,046		7.1%
1900	936		−10.5%
1910	936		0.0%
1920	856		−8.5%
1930	782		−8.6%
1940	656		−16.1%
1950	546		−16.8%
1960	525		−3.8%
1970	598		13.9%
1980	619		3.5%
1990	785		26.8%
2000	841		7.1%
2010	824		−2.0%
2020	827		0.4%
U.S. Decennial Census

=== 2010 census ===
As of the census of 2010, there were 824 people, 397 households, and 238 families living in the town. The population density was 46.0 inhabitants per square mile (17.8/km^{2}). There were 874 housing units at an average density of 48.8 per square mile (18.8/km^{2}). The racial makeup of the town was 97.9% White, 1.0% Asian, 0.4% from other races, and 0.7% from two or more races. Hispanic or Latino of any race were 0.5% of the population.

There were 397 households, of which 19.1% had children under the age of 18 living with them, 52.6% were married couples living together, 4.8% had a female householder with no husband present, 2.5% had a male householder with no wife present, and 40.1% were non-families. 33.8% of all households were made up of individuals, and 14.6% had someone living alone who was 65 years of age or older. The average household size was 2.08 and the average family size was 2.63.

The median age in the town was 52.9 years. 17.2% of residents were under the age of 18; 4.8% were between the ages of 18 and 24; 16.4% were from 25 to 44; 35.4% were from 45 to 64; and 26.1% were 65 years of age or older. The gender makeup of the town was 48.3% male and 51.7% female.

=== 2000 census ===
As of the census of 2000, there were 841 people, 371 households, and 244 families living in the town. The population density was 46.8 inhabitants per square mile (18.1/km^{2}). There were 697 housing units at an average density of 38.8 per square mile (15.0/km^{2}). The racial makeup of the town was 98.45% White, 0.12% African American, 0.12% Native American, 0.59% Asian, 0.36% from other races, and 0.36% from two or more races. Hispanic or Latino of any race were 0.95% of the population.

There were 371 households, out of which 26.4% had children under the age of 18 living with them, 56.9% were married couples living together, 6.2% had a female householder with no husband present, and 34.2% were non-families. 29.1% of all households were made up of individuals, and 14.6% had someone living alone who was 65 years of age or older. The average household size was 2.27 and the average family size was 2.79.

In the town, the population was spread out, with 21.5% under the age of 18, 4.2% from 18 to 24, 22.9% from 25 to 44, 33.1% from 45 to 64, and 18.3% who were 65 years of age or older. The median age was 46 years. For every 100 females, there were 94.7 males. For every 100 females age 18 and over, there were 90.2 males.

The median income for a household in the town was $36,786, and the median income for a family was $46,591. Males had a median income of $30,250 versus $23,750 for females. The per capita income for the town was $21,704. About 6.9% of families and 12.7% of the population were below the poverty line, including 21.3% of those under age 18 and 9.3% of those age 65 or over.

== Archaeology ==
An 11th-century Norse coin was (allegedly) found in Brooklin at the site of an excavation of a Native American trading center. If true this would be the only physical evidence of Nordic settlers having entered the area of what is now the United States. If not an outright hoax, it is also possible that the coin was brought to the site not directly by Vikings, but rather through trading.

== National Historic Sites ==
- Beth Eden Chapel, added August 2, 2001
- Brooklin IOOF Hall, added January 26, 1990
- Flye Point 2, added April 15, 1985
- Goddard Site, added May 7, 1979
- E. B. White House, added September 22, 1986

== Education ==
It is in the Brooklin School District. The Brooklin School is a K-8 school.

Brooklin pays George Stevens Academy, a private school, to educate its students at the high school level.

The number of school districts in Stonington, involving one room schoolhouses, went from 10 to 9 and then 6 as of circa 1849, 1876, and then 1909. Brooklin High School closed in 1969, with ts facility becoming a junior high school. High school-aged students as of 2008 attend GSA, or they go to Deer Isle-Stonington High School.

== Notable people ==
- John Wesley Powell, geologist and explorer
- Oswald Veblen, mathematician, geometer, topologist
- E. B. White, author of Charlotte's Web, The Trumpet of the Swan, and Stuart Little
- James Russell Wiggins, managing editor of The Washington Post, United Nations ambassador
