= List of Katy Perry records and achievements =

Katy Perry records and achievements

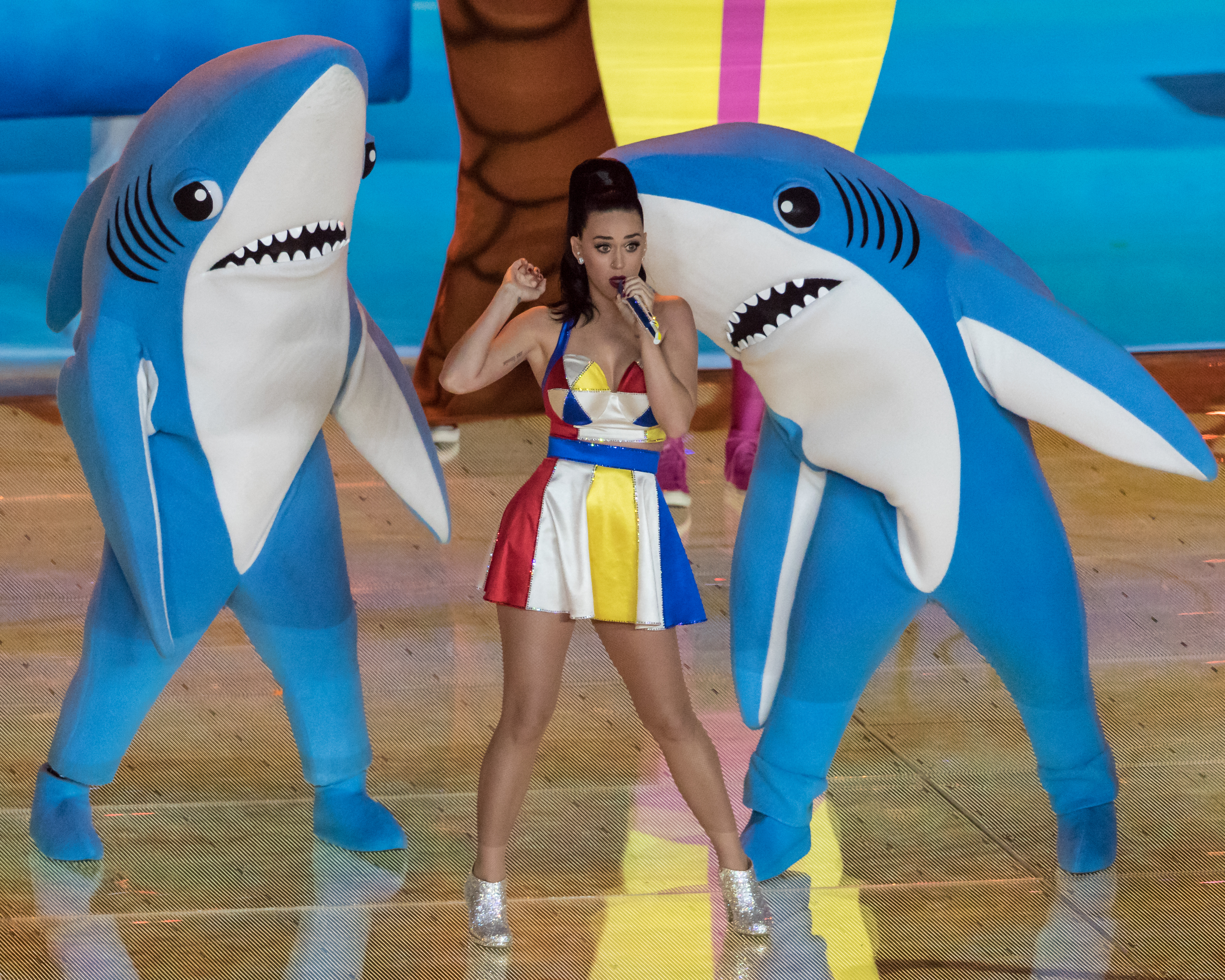
Perry's Super Bowl XLIX halftime show in February 2015, which at the time became the most-watched performance in history

The American singer Katy Perry has accumulated various world records and commercial achievements throughout her career. She first appeared in the 2010 edition of Guinness World Records as the first female artist to have sold over three million digital downloads for her first two singles, "I Kissed a Girl" and "Hot n Cold". Other Guinness records she has since earned include becoming the first female artist to have five US Billboard Hot 100 number-one singles from one album. Perry achieved this with her third studio album, Teenage Dream. She also held multiple world records for being the most followed female person, female pop star, and overall Twitter user, which Guinness published in different years. As of 2022, Perry has made 20 appearances overall on Guinness World Records.

Billboard magazine named her as the "Greatest Pop Star of 2010". She also placed 25th on their 2024 list of the "Greatest Pop Stars of the 21st Century". The magazine additionally ranked her fifth on its 2025 "Top Women of the 21st Century" list, and 15th on the overall list. She is the only artist with three songs that have sold over six million digital downloads in the United States during the Nielsen SoundScan era. In 2019, Perry was declared the most certified recording artist of Capitol Records by the Recording Industry Association of America (RIAA), and five years later, Teenage Dream became the only album to contain four RIAA Diamond-certified songs.

"Roar," the lead single of Perry's fourth studio album Prism, is Australia's fourth most certified single of all time according to the Australian Recording Industry Association (ARIA). In Canada, Teenage Dream was the eighth best-selling album of the 2010s, and it was certified Diamond by Music Canada, along with seven of her singles. The Official Charts Company (OCC) reported in 2024 that ten of Perry's singles have sold 1.2 million units or higher within the United Kingdom, with "Roar" being her biggest seller and most streamed song. In Brazil, she has 15 songs that are certified Diamond or higher by Pro-Música Brasil (PMB), and in Italy, the Federazione Industria Musicale Italiana (FIMI) listed her among the most certified music artists since 2009. Globally, Perry was named the Top Global Female Recording Artist in 2013 by the International Federation of the Phonographic Industry (IFPI). With over 151 million records sold worldwide, she is one of the best-selling music artists of all time.

In 2014, "Dark Horse" was the fourth most-streamed song globally on Spotify, and Perry was the most-streamed female artist, ranking fifth overall. That year, the music video for "Dark Horse" was the most-watched video on YouTube worldwide. She then became the first artist to have two music videos, "Dark Horse" and "Roar", reach over one billion views in 2015. A decade later, Perry obtained another milestone, becoming the first artist with two music videos that surpassed four billion views on YouTube. As of November 2025, she has garnered more than 125 billion cumulative streams from various digital and streaming platforms.

With an estimated net worth of $360 million, Perry is also one of the wealthiest music artists. She ranked among Forbes' highest-paid female musicians lists from 2011 to 2020, consistently landing in the top ten each year, ranking first in 2015 and 2018. The singer was also included in its 2024 and 2025 lists of "America's Richest Self-Made Women". She is the ninth top touring female artist of the 21st century according to Pollstar.

== World records ==
In 2008, Perry's first two singles, "I Kissed a Girl" and "Hot n Cold" from her second studio album, One of the Boys, sold over three million digital downloads in the United States. These sales earned her a place in Guinness World Records as the first female artist to accomplish that, which was published in the book's 2010 edition. She obtained another world record upon becoming the first female artist to have five US Billboard Hot 100 number-one singles from one album. The singles "California Gurls", "Teenage Dream", "Firework", "E.T.", and "Last Friday Night (T.G.I.F.)" are from her third studio album, Teenage Dream, and all peaked at number one on the chart. It was the second album overall to achieve this, following Michael Jackson's Bad.

Perry reached over 50 million followers on Twitter (later known as X) on February 1, 2014, becoming the most followed person on the platform, appearing in the 2015 edition of Guinness World Records. The singer re-appeared with the same world record in the next year's edition, along with three more records. In 2017, she further extended her record for the most followers, and Guinness gave her two more titles of most followed female person and female pop star on the platform. As of April 2021, Perry still holds the world record for the most followers on Twitter for a female popstar.

Her performance at the Super Bowl XLIX halftime show on February 1, 2015, was seen by 118.5 million viewers, making it the most-watched halftime show at the time. This earned Perry a Guinness record for the largest television audience for a Super Bowl halftime performance. She held the world record for eight years until Rihanna broke it on February 12, 2023.

Key
†	Indicates a former world record

Year, title of the record, and the record holder(s)
Year (Note: The year refers to when the world record was first included in the Guinness World Records physical book or posted on their official website.)	World record	Record holder(s)	Ref.
2010	Best start on the US Digital Chart by a female artist	Perry	
2012	Most searched-for female online	Perry	
2013	First female with five US Billboard Hot 100 number-one singles from one album	Perry	
2015	† Most Twitter followers	Perry	
2015	† Most viewed Super Bowl halftime performance	Super Bowl XLIX halftime show (starring Perry)	
2015	Most Just Dance appearances by one artist	Perry	
2016	† Most viewed music video online by a female artist	"Dark Horse" (featuring Juicy J)	
2016	† Best-selling digital artist in the United States	Perry	
2016	† Highest annual earnings ever for a female pop star	Perry	
2016	Highest annual earnings for a female pop star in 2015	Perry	
2017	† Most viewed music channel on YouTube by a female artist	Perry	
2017	First user to reach 100 million followers on Twitter	Perry	
2017	† Most followers on Twitter for a female user	Perry	
2017	Most followers on Twitter for a female pop star	Perry	
2017	† Most streamed-track by a female artist on Spotify in 24 hours	"Chained to the Rhythm" (featuring Skip Marley)	
2018	Most valuable grill	Grill created by Dr. William "Bill" Dorfman and worn by Katy Perry	
2018	Most followers on Twitter for an actor	Perry	
2020	Highest annual earnings for a female pop star in 2018	Perry	
2022	Most RIAA Diamond singles for a female artist	Perry (shared with Cardi B)	
2022	Most consecutive weeks in the top 10 of US Billboard Hot 100	Perry	

== Music sales and charts ==
=== United States ===
==== Billboard ====
In the United States, Teenage Dream is Perry's first album to debut at number one on the Billboard 200 chart for the week ending September 11, 2010. Since its release, the album has spent a total of 461 non-consecutive weeks on the chart as of March 2026, and has become one of the longest-charting albums by any female artist. Prism, her fourth studio album, also debuted at number one on November 9, 2013, and became her second-longest charting album, remaining on the charts for 102 weeks. Continuing her streak, on the chart dated July 1, 2017, Witness, Perry's fifth studio album, became her third album to debut atop the Billboard 200. Her albums One of the Boys, Smile, and 143 peaked in the top 10 of the chart.

Perry has accumulated nine number-one singles on the Billboard Hot 100, her most recent being "Dark Horse" in 2014. The song is her longest-running on the chart, remaining there for 57 weeks. After a decade, she remains among the artists with the most number-one songs on the Hot 100. She is also among the artists with the most years in a row with new Hot 100 number-one songs. On the chart dated July 5, 2008, "I Kissed a Girl" peaked at the top position of the Hot 100, becoming the 1000th number-one of the rock era (the 961st number-one single on the chart). The song also gave Capitol Records two consecutive number-one singles following Coldplay's "Viva la Vida", making it the first time since 1976 that the label had two back-to-back songs top the Hot 100. "California Gurls", which featured the American rapper Snoop Dogg, holds the record for the fastest number-one ascent on the Hot 100 by a Capitol Records artist. It took four weeks to reach the chart's summit. On the chart dated December 14, 2011, "The One That Got Away", the sixth and final single from Teenage Dream, entered the top five of the Hot 100, making the album the third to have six or more top-five singles on the chart, following Rhythm Nation 1814 by Janet Jackson and Faith by George Michael. Teenage Dream is also one of the albums with the most Hot 100 top-10 songs.

From May 2010 to September 2011, Perry spent a record-breaking 69 consecutive weeks inside the chart's top 10, a record that has stayed unbroken as of May 2022. On the chart dated March 3, 2012, "Part of Me", the lead single from a reissue titled Teenage Dream: The Complete Confection, was the 20th song in Billboard's history to debut at the top of the Hot 100. Five years later, "Chained to the Rhythm", the lead single of Witness, debuted at number four on the Hot 100 for the week dated March 4, 2017. This debut marked the highest for a song by a female artist since Adele's "Hello" opened at number one on November 14, 2015. The song became Perry's 14th Hot 100 top 10 and the third highest-debuting among her Hot 100 entries, behind "Part of Me" and "California Gurls". As of August 2017, she is the ninth artist with the most consecutive weeks on the Hot 100 since its inception on August 4, 1958.

Teenage Dream is the album with the most number-one songs on the Pop Airplay chart, with six number-ones. Its first five singles, including "Part of Me", all peaked at number one on the chart. "E.T.", a collaboration with Kanye West, set a record for most weekly plays in the chart's history: for the week ending May 1, 2011, Nielsen Broadcast Data Systems registered 12,330 plays over its 131 stations—an average of 94 plays per station. This figure rewrote Perry's previous record with "California Gurls" in July 2010 (12,159). That record was later broken yet again by Perry, when "Last Friday Night (T.G.I.F.)" registered 12,468 plays for the week dated August 13, 2011. Two years later, "Dark Horse" set the mark for the most weekly plays in the Pop Airplay chart's history with 16,151 plays dated March 1, 2014. When "Chained to the Rhythm" entered the top ten of the chart in March 2017, she became fifth among the artists with the most top-10s, tied with Maroon 5 and Usher. Overall, Perry, Maroon 5, and Rihanna are the artists with the most number-one songs on the Pop Airplay chart, with 11 number-ones each. As of March 2014, she has held the top spot on the chart for a total of 46 weeks, more than any other artist, with "California Gurls" spending the most weeks atop the chart among her number-one songs.

When Perry's collaboration with Nicki Minaj, "Swish Swish", peaked at number one on the Dance Club Songs chart, the singer became the record-holder for the most consecutive number-one songs, with 18 songs. "Waking Up in Vegas", the fourth and final single of One of the Boys, was her first chart-topper, peaking at number one for the week ending August 22, 2009. Furthermore, Teenage Dream became the first album to generate seven number-ones on the Dance Club Songs chart when "The One That Got Away" topped the chart on January 7, 2012.

On the Rhythmic Airplay chart, Perry achieved her first number-one hit with "E.T." in May 2011, a rare feat for female pop artists considering she was the third to ever do so. She is also one of the artists with the most Songs of the Summer number-ones, and the third with the most top-10s, tied with Justin Bieber, Elton John, and Post Malone.

===== Billboard Year-End Top Artists =====
Year	Top Artists of the Year	Top Albums Artists	Top Singles Artists	Ref.
2008	19th	67th	11th	
2009	12th	48th	10th	
2010	11th	35th	7th	
2011	3rd	16th	1st	
2012	7th	28th	6th	
2013	14th	33rd	14th	
2014	2nd	7th	1st	
2015	21st	48th	—	
2016	91st	—	—	
2017	49th	78th	69th	
2019	—	—	62nd	
2023	—	91st	—	
2024	—	75th	—	
2025	—	89th	—	

===== Billboard Decade-End Top Artists =====
Decade	Top Artists of the Decade	Ref.
2000s	97th	
2010s	8th	

===== Billboard Greatest of All Time =====
Name of the list and result
List	Result	Ref.
Greatest of All Time Artists	61st	
Greatest of All Time Hot 100 Artists	26th	
Greatest of All Time 60th Anniversary Hot 100 Songs	106th ("Dark Horse" (featuring Juicy J))	
Greatest of All Time 60th Anniversary Hot 100 Songs	166th ("E.T." (featuring Kanye West))	
Greatest of All Time 60th Anniversary Hot 100 Songs	205th ("Firework")	
Greatest of All Time 60th Anniversary Hot 100 Songs	245th ("California Gurls" (featuring Snoop Dogg))	
Greatest of All Time 60th Anniversary Hot 100 Songs	485th ("Roar")	
Greatest of All Time 60th Anniversary Hot 100 Songs	499th ("I Kissed a Girl")	
Greatest of All Time 60th Anniversary Hot 100 Songs	525th ("Hot n Cold")	
Top Artists of the 21st Century	15th	
Top Hot 100 Songs of the 21st Century	48th ("Dark Horse" (featuring Juicy J))	
Top Hot 100 Songs of the 21st Century	82nd ("E.T." (featuring Kanye West)	
Top Hot 100 Songs of the 21st Century	97th ("Firework")	
Top 200 Albums of the 21st Century	113th (Teenage Dream)	
Top 200 Albums of the 21st Century	149th (Prism)	
Top Women Artists of the 21st Century	5th	
Greatest of All Time Hot 100 Women Artists	9th	
Greatest of All Time Hot 100 Songs by Women	33rd ("Dark Horse" (featuring Juicy J))	
Greatest of All Time Hot 100 Songs by Women	52nd ("E.T." (featuring Kanye West))	
Greatest of All Time Hot 100 Songs by Women	67th ("Firework")	
Greatest of All Time Hot 100 Songs by Women	75th ("California Gurls" (featuring Snoop Dogg))	
Greatest of All Time Top 200 Albums Women Artists	38th	
Greatest of All Time Top 200 Albums by Women	58th (Teenage Dream)	
Greatest of All Time Top 200 Albums by Women	77th (Prism)	
Greatest of All Time Holiday 100 Songs	79th ("Cozy Little Christmas")	
Greatest of All Time Songs of the Summer	37th ("California Gurls" (featuring Snoop Dogg))	
Greatest of All Time Songs of the Summer	44th ("I Kissed a Girl")	
Greatest of All Time Songs of the Summer	160th ("Last Friday Night (T.G.I.F.)")	
Greatest of All Time Songs of the Summer	208th ("Wide Awake")	
Greatest of All Time Pop Songs Artists	4th	
Greatest of All Time Pop Songs	23rd ("Dark Horse" (featuring Juicy J))	
Greatest of All Time Adult Pop Songs Artists	7th	
Greatest of All Time Hot Latin Songs	44th ("Con Calma" (remix with Daddy Yankee featuring Snow))	
Greatest of All Time Top Dance Club Artists	15th	
Greatest Pop Star of 2010	Perry	
Greatest Pop Star of 2011	Perry (Honorable Mention)	
Greatest Pop Star of 2014	Perry (Honorable Mention)	
Greatest Pop Stars of the 21st Century	25th	
Top Songwriters of the 21st Century	13th	

==== Nielsen SoundScan ====
Perry has achieved various records and achievements during the Nielsen SoundScan era. Prism debuted with 286,000 copies sold and acquired the largest first-week sales by a female artist in 2013, surpassing the 270,000 sales of Miley Cyrus' Bangerz. However, this feat was surpassed by Beyoncé's self-titled album, when it sold 617,000 copies that December. At the time of its release, Prism had the second-highest first-week sales of the year for a pop record behind Daft Punk's Random Access Memories (339,000 sales) and marked Perry's highest first-week sales. The album also had the highest opening week sales for a female pop artist since Madonna's 2012 album MDNA sold 359,000 copies in its first week. In 2014, Prism was the eighth best-selling album during the first half of the year with sales of 453,000 according to Nielsen SoundScan. Perry and Pharrell Williams were the only artists with an album and a single on the mid-year best-selling lists.

During its first week on sale in 2013, "Roar" sold 557,000 digital downloads, earning Perry the sixth all-time highest single-week sales at that time and also her biggest digital song sales week ever, breaking her previous record held by "Firework", which sold 509,000 digital copies for the week ending January 8, 2011. It was the biggest first-week single sales for a Capitol Records artist, and the third-biggest debut for a digital song at that time.

According to the annual music industry reports from the Nielsen Company, Perry ranked as the eighth top digital artist in 2008 (5.85 million units sold), moved to fourth in 2010 (11.837 million), and secured the top spot in 2011 (15.187 million). The same year, Teenage Dream was ranked the ninth top digital album, with 299,000 copies sold. From 2009 to 2014, Perry had at least one song that made the top 10 of the year's top digital songs, making her the only artist to have achieved such a feat. Among these songs is "California Gurls," which was the top digital song of 2010 with 4.4 million digital downloads. This amount of digital sales gave Perry a record for the highest pre-album street date track sales in the Nielsen SoundScan era. In addition, she is the only artist to have three songs selling six million digital downloads, with "Firework" selling 7 million, "Roar" at 6.11 million, and "Dark Horse" at 6.08 million as of October 2015.

As of February 2017, Perry's pure sales in the United States stand at 6.5 million for albums and 70 million for digital songs, according to Nielsen SoundScan. In August 2020, they revealed that "Dark Horse" was the singer's most on-demand streamed song (1.2 billion streams), while "Firework" was her best-selling song (7.4 million digital downloads) and her most-heard song on the radio (6.8 billion audience impressions).

==== Recording Industry Association of America (RIAA) ====
According to the Recording Industry Association of America (RIAA), Perry is the thirteenth top digital singles artist in the United States, with 121.5 million digital singles and 19 million album units. She is one of only five music artists in RIAA history to have more than 100 million certified songs. In 2017, she became the first artist to have three Diamond-certified songs from the RIAA. Her new certification for "Roar" joined her previously Diamond-certified songs "Dark Horse" and "Firework". Seven years later, "California Gurls", "Teenage Dream", "E.T.", and Teenage Dream have also been certified Diamond, bringing a total of seven Diamond certifications from the organization. The latter is one of the few LPs from the 2010s to achieve Diamond certification, and is also the only album with four Diamond-certified songs on its tracklist. In August 2019, the RIAA announced Perry had become the most certified recording artist of Capitol Records. She is also the label's first artist to accumulate 100 million certified units.

=== Australia ===
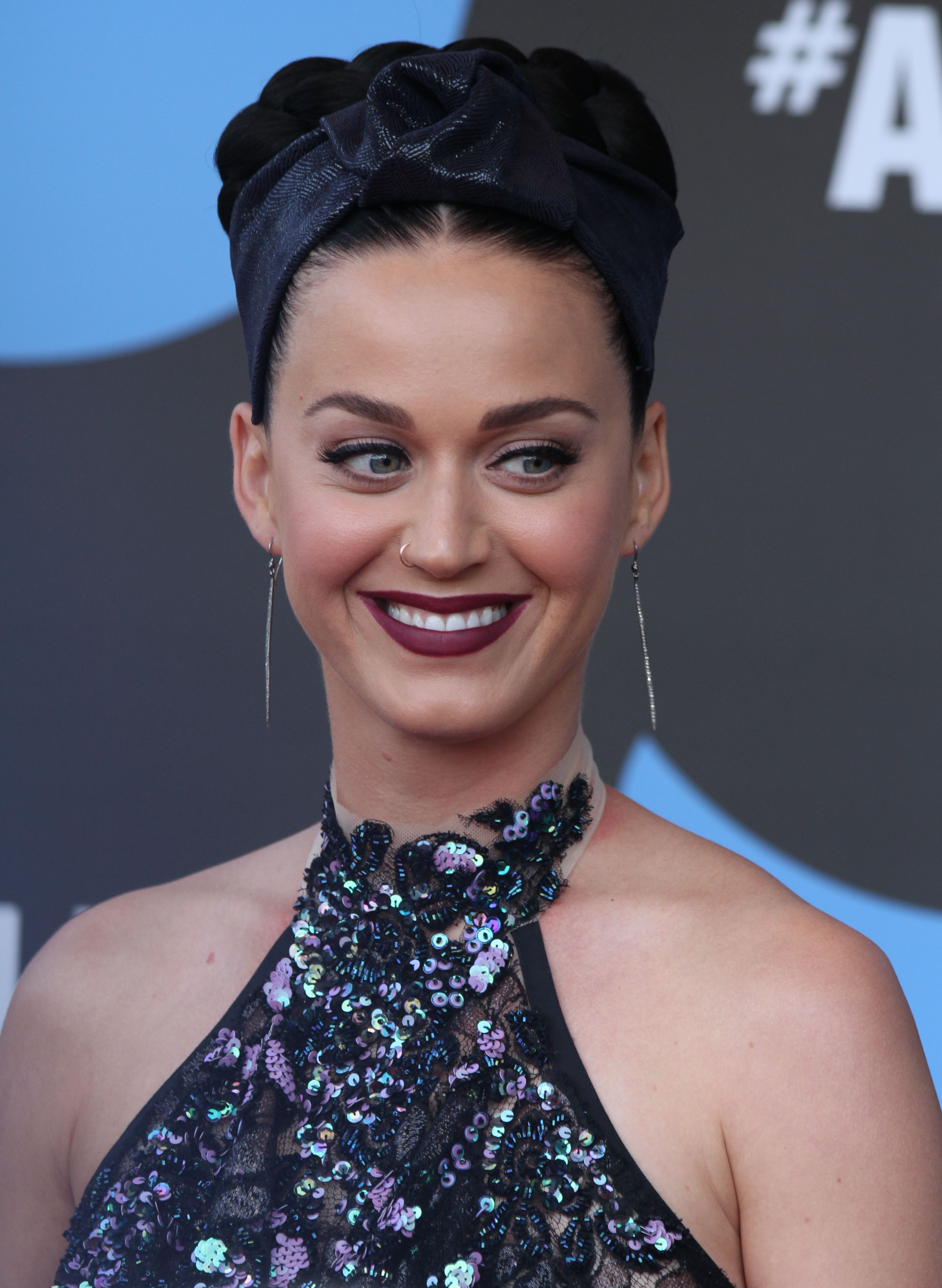
Perry at the ARIA Music Awards in November 2014

Perry's first chart-topper in Australia was "I Kissed a Girl," which stayed atop the ARIA Singles Chart for six weeks, the longest for any number-one song in 2008. Since then, she has achieved two number-one albums and three more number-one singles on the ARIA Charts. In June 2010, "California Gurls" climbed to the top position of the ARIA Singles Chart and stayed there for four weeks, marking Perry's second number-one single. Later that September, Teenage Dream became her first number-one album on the ARIA Albums Chart, where it remained at number one for two weeks. In October 2013, Perry obtained her second number-one album with Prism, which became the second-best-selling album of the year, with 179,000 copies sold. Its lead single, "Roar", became her third number-one single and was the year's best-selling single, with 560,000 digital downloads sold. "Rise", the official anthem Perry recorded for the 2016 Summer Olympics, became her fourth and most recent number-one single. It was also the second song in 2016 to debut atop the ARIA Singles Chart following "Pillowtalk" by Zayn Malik. She has accumulated 14 weeks at number-one atop the chart, and ranked fifth on the list of artists with the most number-ones in the 2010s.

Three of her albums have received multi-platinum certifications from the Australian Recording Industry Association (ARIA): Teenage Dream at seven-times Platinum, Prism at six-times Platinum, and One of the Boys at three-times Platinum. "Roar" has become Australia's fourth most certified single of all time (22-times Platinum), tied with "Uptown Funk" by Mark Ronson featuring Bruno Mars and "Blinding Lights" by The Weeknd. Perry also has six more singles that are certified 10-times Platinum or higher by the ARIA, which include "Firework" with 16-times Platinum, "Dark Horse" with 13-times Platinum, "California Gurls", "Teenage Dream", "Last Friday Night (T.G.I.F.)" with 11-times Platinum, and "Hot n Cold" with 10-times Platinum. As of June 2019, the singer has garnered over 685 million streams and sold over 1.8 million albums in Australia.

==== Phonographic Performance Company of Australia (PPCA) ====
Perry appeared multiple times in reports published by the Phonographic Performance Company of Australia (PPCA). These reports were calculated by collating the titles that appeared in their radio broadcast logs from July of last year to June of the current year. The most played songs were published up to 2013, while the most played artists were up to 2020.

Year, name of the list, and result
Year	List	Result	Ref.
2009	Most Played Artists of the Year	3rd	
2009	Most Played Songs of the Year	12th ("Hot n Cold")	
2009	Most Played Songs of the Year	21st ("I Kissed a Girl")	
2010	Most Played Artists of the Year	31st	
2010	Most Played Songs of the Year	77th ("Waking Up in Vegas")	
2011	Most Played Artists of the Year	1st	
2011	Most Played Songs of the Year	4th ("Firework")	
2011	Most Played Songs of the Year	5th ("Teenage Dream")	
2011	Most Played Songs of the Year	21st ("E.T.")	
2011	Most Played Songs of the Year	55th ("California Gurls" (featuring Snoop Dogg))	
2012	Most Played Artists of the Year	3rd	
2012	Most Played Songs of the Year	28th ("Last Friday Night (T.G.I.F.)")	
2012	Most Played Songs of the Year	39th ("Part of Me")	
2012	Most Played Songs of the Year	44th ("The One That Got Away")	
2013	Most Played Artists of the Year	13th	
2013	Most Played Songs of the Year	80th ("Wide Awake")	
2014	Most Played Artists of the Year	1st	
2015	Most Played Artists of the Year	6th	
2017	Most Played Artists of the Year	11th	
2019	Most Played Artists of the Year	43rd	
2020	Most Played Artists of the Year	14th	

=== Canada ===
Throughout her career, Perry has achieved three number-one albums on the Billboard Canadian Albums Chart with Teenage Dream, Prism, and Witness. The latter became her album with the longest chart run, staying on the chart for a total of 279 weeks. She also obtained 10 number-one singles on the Canadian Hot 100 with "I Kissed a Girl", "Hot n Cold", "California Gurls", "Firework", "E.T.", "Last Friday Night (T.G.I.F.)", "Part of Me", "Wide Awake", "Roar", and "Dark Horse". Among these songs, "Hot n Cold" spent the most weeks on the chart, lasting there for 56 weeks. In 2025, Perry ranked 66th on the year-end Top Artists list published by Billboard Canada.

The Nielsen Company reported that "Hot n Cold" and "I Kissed a Girl" were the sixth and eighth among Canada's top digital songs of the Nielsen SoundScan era from 2005 to 2010. In 2019, Nielsen Music/MRC Data Canada published a decade-end music report for the 2010s, ranking Perry fourth among top artists in song sales (5.813 million), sixth for on-demand video streams (448.239 million), eighth for airplay spins (2.06 million), and 10th for airplay audience (10.487 billion). They also listed Teenage Dream as the eighth best-selling album of the decade after selling 376,000 copies in Canada.

Teenage Dream has been certified Diamond by Music Canada (MC). Seven of Perry's songs have also received Diamond certifications: "Hot n Cold", "California Gurls", "Teenage Dream", "Firework", "Last Friday Night (T.G.I.F.)", "Roar", and "Dark Horse".

=== United Kingdom ===
Perry's first number-one in the United Kingdom was "I Kissed a Girl," which stayed atop the UK Singles Chart for five weeks in 2008. Since then, she has achieved four more number-one singles and two number-one albums on the UK Albums Chart according to the Official Charts Company (OCC). Her albums have spent a total of 174 weeks in the top 40 of the national chart, while her songs have spent 320 weeks in the top 40. According to Guinness World Records, Perry is the fourth female artist with the most consecutive weeks in the top 20 of UK Singles Chart (30 weeks), tied with Beyoncé.

In January 2015, "Roar" became the 157th single in British chart history to achieve one million sales in less than a year and a half after its release. The song also marked Perry's second million-seller after "Firework". In June 2024, the OCC revealed that "Roar" has become her best-selling song, with 2.8 million units sold, and her most-streamed song, with over 218 million streams. Her other top singles in the nation include: "Firework" selling 2.2 million units, "Dark Horse" at 1.7 million, "Feels", "California Gurls", and "I Kissed a Girl" at 1.6 million, "Hot n Cold" at 1.5 million, "Last Friday Night (T.G.I.F.)" and "Teenage Dream" at 1.4 million, and "The One That Got Away" at 1.2 million. By October 2025, Perry had surpassed one billion cumulative streams across the United Kingdom, recognized by the British Phonographic Industry (BPI).

Perry has two multi-Platinum albums and 10 multi-Platinum singles in the United Kingdom, certified by the BPI. Teenage Dream is her highest certified album (six-times Platinum), while her highest certified song is "Roar" (five-times Platinum).

==== Phonographic Performance Limited (PPL) ====
Perry was listed eight times in annual reports published by the Phonographic Performance Limited (PPL). These reports were compiled using information collected from recorded music broadcasts on radio and television or played in public spaces. According to the PPL, Perry is the third most played female artist of the 21st century, while "Roar" and "Firework" were among the most played songs of the 2010s.

Year, name of the list, and result
Year	List	Result	Ref.
2011	Most Played Artists of the Year	7th	
2013	Most Played Artists of the Year	8th	
2014	Most Played Artists of the Year	1st	
2014	Most Played Songs of the Year	7th ("Roar")	
2017	Most Played Artists of the Year	10th	
2017	Most Played Songs of the Year	6th ("Chained to the Rhythm" (featuring Skip Marley))	
2024	Most Played Artists of the Year	19th	

=== Other countries ===
==== South America ====
For the week ending May 24, 2019, the remix version of "Con Calma" with Daddy Yankee featuring Snow topped the Billboard Argentina Hot 100 number one for 10 consecutive weeks. It became the chart's longest-running number-one at that time.

In Brazil, Perry has 40 songs that have received certification from Pro-Música Brasil (PMB). Among these, "Dark Horse" received the highest certification, achieving eight-times Diamond status. "Roar" followed with five-times Diamond certification. In total, she has 15 Diamond-certified songs in the country as of February 2025. In October 2024, the Escritório Central de Arrecadação e Distribuição (ECAD) reported Perry's top 10 most played songs in Brazil for the last five years, with "Firework" taking the top spot.

==== Asia-Pacific ====
Throughout her career, Perry has obtained 2.3 billion on-demand streams in China, recognized by Billboard China.

The Indian Music Industry (IMI) issued Perry multi-Platinum certifications when she visited India in November 2019. Teenage Dream was certified two-times Platinum, and both Prism and Witness earned three-times Platinum certifications.

In Japan, Perry has obtained two top-10 albums on the Oricon Albums Chart with Teenage Dream and Prism. The latter stayed 73 weeks on the chart with an additional 40 weeks for the Complete Confection reissue. More than a year after its release, Teenage Dream received a Gold certification from the Recording Industry Association of Japan (RIAJ) in December 2011. On the Billboard Japan Hot 100, Perry has acquired three top-10 singles with "I Kissed a Girl", "California Gurls", and "Roar". The latter has become her highest-peaking song, reaching number four, and is her longest-charting song, remaining on the chart for a total of 24 weeks from 2013 to 2014.

In New Zealand, Perry has achieved two number-one albums and nine number-one singles on the Official Aotearoa Music Charts. Teenage Dream spent a total of 137 weeks on the Top 40 Albums Chart, becoming her longest-charting album. For the week ending October 23, 2025, the album registered its 260th week on the Official Catalog Albums Chart and was certified 10-times Platinum by Recorded Music NZ. "Dark Horse" is Perry's longest-charting song on the Top 40 Singles Chart with 37 weeks, while "Roar" is her most certified single, with six-times Platinum certification.

During the Asian leg of the Prismatic World Tour, Prism received multi-Platinum certifications, including four-times Platinum in the Philippines and two-times Platinum in Indonesia and Thailand.

On the Gaon Digital Chart in South Korea, for the week ending September 11, 2010, every track from Teenage Dream that had not been released earlier debuted on the International Download Chart. All 12 songs from the album made it onto the chart for that week. Similarly, during the week ending October 26, 2013, all previously unreleased tracks from the Prism debuted on both the International Digital and Download Charts, each selling thousands of digital downloads. All 13 songs from the album, with an additional three from the deluxe edition, made it onto the chart for that week. Among these songs is "Roar", which previously debuted at number one on the International Digital Chart for the week ending August 17, 2013. It became Perry's only number one song on the chart and has sold more than 120,000 digital downloads as of December 2013.

==== Europe ====
"I Kissed a Girl" and "Hot n Cold" both topped the official singles charts of Austria, Germany, and Switzerland in 2008. In Austria, Perry achieved another number-one single with "Roar" and a number-one album with Teenage Dream, which has remained on the Ö3 Austria Top 40 Albums Chart for 207 weeks. In March 2017, Prism was certified three times Platinum by IFPI Austria, making it the singer's highest-certified album in the country. In Germany, Perry has obtained four top-10 albums and 11 top-10 singles on the GfK Entertainment Charts, while in Switzerland, she has five top-10 albums and 10 top-10 singles on the Swiss Hitparade Charts. Teenage Dream charted on the GfK Albums Chart for 210 weeks and was certified two-times Platinum by the Bundesverband Musikindustrie (BVMI) in 2025. The album remains Perry's longest-charting and highest certified album in Germany. Similarly, in Switzerland, Teenage Dream spent a total of 230 weeks on the Swiss Hitparade Albums Chart, making it her longest-charting album in that region as well.

In the Commonwealth of Independent States (CIS), Perry ranked 101st among the Top Radio Artists of the 2000s according to TopHit, 35th in the 2010s, and 75th in the 2020s. As of December 2025, "Hot n Cold" is Perry's song with the most airplays in the CIS, having received over 2.6 million airplays since its release. "Chained to the Rhythm" follows with more than 2.2 million airplays.

In Croatia, Perry became the third artist, after Coldplay and Lady Gaga, to reach number one on the Top lista airplay chart across three different decades. She achieved this feat when "When I'm Gone", a collaboration with Alesso, reached the chart's top position in March 2022. Perry has accumulated four number-one songs with a total of 25 weeks atop the airplay chart.

Perry has attained two top-10 albums and seven top-10 singles on Hitlisten charts in Denmark, while in Norway, she has three top-10 albums and nine top-10 singles on VG-lista charts. One of the Boys, Teenage Dream, the Complete Confection, and Prism are all certified two-times Platinum by IFPI Danmark. IFPI Norge certified One of the Boys as two-times Platinum, while both Teenage Dream and Prism received five-times Platinum certifications. In addition, "Roar" was certified eight-times Platinum in November 2021, making it Perry's most certified song in Norway.

In France, Perry has acquired four top-10 albums and 10 top-10 songs on the SNEP Charts. One of the Boys and Teenage Dream were both certified two-times Platinum by the Syndicat national de l'édition phonographique (SNEP). The latter has sold 266,200 copies in the country as of December 2013 and spent 89 weeks on the French Albums Chart. Pure Charts reported in 2014 that when Prism reached 100,000 sales in France, Perry and Rihanna were the only international female artists to reach this milestone with their recent releases. By April 2017, the album had reached 260,000 copies sold. In December 2014, "I Kissed a Girl" was ranked 175th among France's best-selling singles of the 21st century with 275,900 copies sold. The song continued to be Perry's top-selling song in the country as of June 2017.

Perry has earned two number-one albums and four number-one singles in the Republic of Ireland. Teenage Dream, her first number-one album, stayed on the Irish Albums Chart for 413 weeks and was certified two-times Platinum by the Irish Recorded Music Association (IRMA). Prism debuted at number one in October 2013, marking the singer's second number-one album in the country. Perry's number-one singles on the Irish Singles Chart include "I Kissed a Girl", "California Gurls", "Teenage Dream", and "Roar", the latter of which is her longest-charting song at 61 weeks.

"I Kissed a Girl" peaked at number one on the official singles chart of the Federazione Industria Musicale Italiana (FIMI) in 2008, and was among the year's best-selling digital singles in Italy. Thereafter, Perry has obtained a total of five top-10 albums and 11 top-10 singles, with additional two number-ones on the DVD chart. According to the FIMI, she is the 98th most certified music artist in Italy since the certification database became available in 2009. She also consistently ranked among the most certified artists every year from 2011 to 2025, except in 2016, 2020 and 2024. As of November 2025, Perry has acquired 23 Platinum and 11 Gold certifications for both her albums and singles in Italy.

In the Netherlands, Teenage Dream, Prism, and Witness peaked in the top 10 of the Dutch Album Top 100. The former stayed 207 weeks on the chart with an additional 12 weeks from the Complete Confection reissue. In 2014, "Dark Horse" became Perry's only number-one song on the Dutch Single Top 100. It stayed on the chart for 40 weeks, longer than any of her other songs.

For the week dated June 9, 2017, Witness debuted at number one on the Top 100 Álbumes, becoming Perry's only number-one album in Spain. She obtained four more top-10 albums and three top-10 singles on the Top 100 Canciones. Her longest charting song, "Hot n Cold", spent 40 weeks on the charts despite peaking at number 13. According to Productores de Música de España (PROMUSICAE), "Roar" and "Dark Horse" are tied as Perry's most certified singles in the country, both receiving two-times Platinum certification.

=== Global ===
==== Record sales ====
With over 151 million records sold worldwide, Perry is among the best-selling music artists of all time. According to The Daily Telegraph, she is 10th among female artists who have sold the most records worldwide. Multiple publications have reported that Perry is the best-selling female artist of Capitol Records. In 2015, Guinness World Records listed Perry, Lady Gaga, and Rihanna as the only female artists who have released three digital singles that have sold at least 10 million copies worldwide.

Reported worldwide sales figures of selected albums
Album	Sales	Ref.
Teenage Dream	12,000,000	
Prism	8,000,000	
One of the Boys	7,000,000	
Witness	1,250,000	

Reported worldwide sales figures of selected singles
Single	Sales	Ref.
"Firework"	17,000,000	
"Roar"	15,000,000	
"California Gurls" (featuring Snoop Dogg)	13,000,000	
"E.T." (featuring Kanye West)	13,000,000	
"Dark Horse" (featuring Juicy J)	13,000,000	
"Teenage Dream"	12,000,000	
"I Kissed a Girl"	11,810,000	
"Hot n Cold"	11,790,000	
"Last Friday Night (T.G.I.F.)"	9,400,000	
"The One That Got Away"	6,500,000	

==== Streaming ====
Perry has garnered more than 125 billion streams globally throughout her career.

Reported total streams of selected albums
Album	Streams	Ref.
Witness	6,500,000,000	
Smile	4,000,000,000	

==== International Federation of the Phonographic Industry (IFPI) ====
Perry appeared multiple times in annual digital music reports published by the International Federation of the Phonographic Industry (IFPI). The organization declared her the Top Global Female Recording Artist of 2013, calling her "a global phenomenon." Prism was the top global album by a female artist that year, and "Roar" was the second top global single by a female artist. The following year, "Dark Horse" was the top global single by a female artist after selling 13.2 million units.

Year, name of the list, and result
Year (Note: IFPI publishes its annual digital music reports in the first few months of the year, covering data from the previous year.)	List	Result	Ref.
2009	Top Global Albums of 2008	33rd (One of the Boys)	
2009	Top Global Singles of 2008	7th ("I Kissed a Girl")	
2011	Top Global Albums of 2010	11th (Teenage Dream)	
2011	Top Global Singles of 2010	6th ("California Gurls" (featuring Snoop Dogg))	
2012	Top Global Albums of 2011	23rd (Teenage Dream)	
2013	Top Global Albums of 2012	50th (Teenage Dream: The Complete Confection)	
2014	Top Global Recording Artists of 2013	5th	
2014	Top Global Albums of 2013	6th (Prism)	
2014	Top Global Singles of 2013	5th ("Roar")	
2015	Top Global Recording Artists of 2014	9th	
2015	Top Global Singles of 2014	2nd ("Dark Horse" (featuring Juicy J))	
2015	Top Global Albums of 2014	26th (Prism)	
2018	Top Global Albums of 2017	15th (Witness)	

== Digital platforms ==
=== Amazon Music ===
In December 2022, it was reported that Perry helped Amazon Music become a "Christmas power player" through her holiday single "Cozy Little Christmas", which was exclusive to the platform when initially released in 2018. Stephen Brower, global co-lead and artist relations at Amazon Music, credited the song's commercial success with helping Amazon Music grow its seasonal music offerings and attract more listeners during the holiday season.

=== iTunes ===
In August 2013, "Roar" debuted at number one on the iTunes Store in 68 countries when it was released. In addition, Prism reached number one in 100 countries in 2013, while Witness reached the top spot in 46 countries in 2017.

=== NetEase Cloud Music ===
More than a week after its release in June 2017, Witness has registered online sales of over 1.4 million songs on various music services in China, with NetEase Cloud Music achieving 40% of that with 560,000 songs.

=== Spotify ===
"Dark Horse" spent 11 weeks atop the Spotify US Weekly chart, the longest run in the top spot for any number-one song in 2014. "Chained to the Rhythm" set a new record for accumulating over three million streams on its release day, February 10, 2017, on Spotify. This feat earned Perry a Guinness record for the most-streamed track by a female artist on the platform in 24 hours.

Spotify published a report in October 2018, listing Perry as the ninth most-streamed female artist of all time and eighth among the first 10 artists to reach one billion streams on the platform. One of the Boys, Teenage Dream, Prism, Witness, and Smile have surpassed one billion streams on the streaming service. As of August 2025, Teenage Dream has become Perry's most-streamed album globally, while "Dark Horse" is her most-streamed song with 1.7 billion streams. Overall, the singer has nine more songs that have surpassed one billion streams, over 91 million monthly listeners, and over 30 million followers on Spotify.

Year, name of the list, and result
Year	List	Result	Ref.
2012	Most-Streamed Female Artists of the Year	5th	
2013	Most-Streamed Female Artists of the Year	4th	
2014	Most-Streamed Artists of the Year	5th	
2014	Most-Streamed Female Artists of the Year	1st	
2014	Most-Streamed Songs of the Year	4th ("Dark Horse" (featuring Juicy J))	
2017	Most-Streamed Female Artists of the Year	9th	

=== YouTube and Vevo ===
As of October 2025, Perry's official YouTube channel has accumulated more than 45 million subscribers, making it the 34th most subscribed channel on the platform. She also has 26 Vevo-certified music videos, each reaching more than 100 million views. The music video for "Roar" reached one billion views in July 2015, making her the first artist in history to have two music videos with over a billion views on YouTube. "Dark Horse" had previously reached one billion views as well. When "Hot n Cold" hit one billion views in November 2020, Perry became the first female artist to have six music videos with over one billion views on the platform. The other music videos of hers that have over one billion views are "Last Friday Night (T.G.I.F.)", "Firework", and "Bon Appétit".

In 2023, "Roar" became the first music video by a female artist to reach three billion views. A year later, it surpassed four billion views, making Perry the first female artist to accomplish such a feat. In June 2025, Perry became the first artist in YouTube history to have two music videos with over four billion views on the platform. She achieved this when "Dark Horse" crossed the milestone. Prism also became the first studio album to have two songs with more than four billion views on YouTube.

Year, name of the list, and result
Year	List	Result	Ref.
2011	Most-Watched Music Videos of the Year	9th ("E.T." (featuring Kanye West))	
2011	Most-Watched Music Videos of the Year	10th ("Last Friday Night (T.G.I.F.)")	
2013	Most-Watched Music Videos of the Year	4th ("Roar")	
2014	Most-Watched Music Videos of the Year	1st ("Dark Horse" (featuring Juicy J))	
2014	Most-Watched Music Videos of the Year	20th ("This Is How We Do")	
2019	Most-Watched Music Videos of the 2000s	6th ("Hot n Cold")	
2019	Most-Watched Music Videos of the 2010s	5th ("Roar")	
2019	Most-Watched Music Videos of the 2010s	7th ("Dark Horse" (featuring Juicy J))	

== Touring ==
In 2014, the Prismatic World Tour broke the venue record at Sydney's Allphones Arena, selling 89,500 tickets and beating the record previously held by One Direction, who sold 81,542 across seven shows the previous year. Perry was the first solo artist to perform at the Philippine Arena during her tour on May 7, 2015. It was one of her biggest shows then, with over 30,000 attendees.

Perry's fifth concert tour, The Lifetimes Tour, in Monterrey, Mexico, in April 2025, set a record for the fastest sellout concert tour in that region. It was reported that the concert tickets sold out within 30 minutes, prompting Perry's management to add another show. In August of the same year, shows at Hangzhou's Olympic Expo Center, Shanghai's Mercedes-Benz Arena, and Haikou's Wuyuan River Stadium in China sold out one minute after going on sale.

=== Billboard ===
Perry's second concert tour, the California Dreams Tour, ranked 13th on Billboard's Top 25 Tours of 2011 after grossing $48.9 million. Her third concert tour, the Prismatic World Tour, grossed $108 million and ranked fifth on the magazine's Top 25 Tours list in 2014. The tour grossed over $41.7 million the following year from 27 shows in the first half of 2015. Her first concert residency, Play, grossed $46.4 million, becoming the 21st highest-grossing residency in Billboard Boxscore history.

=== Pollstar ===
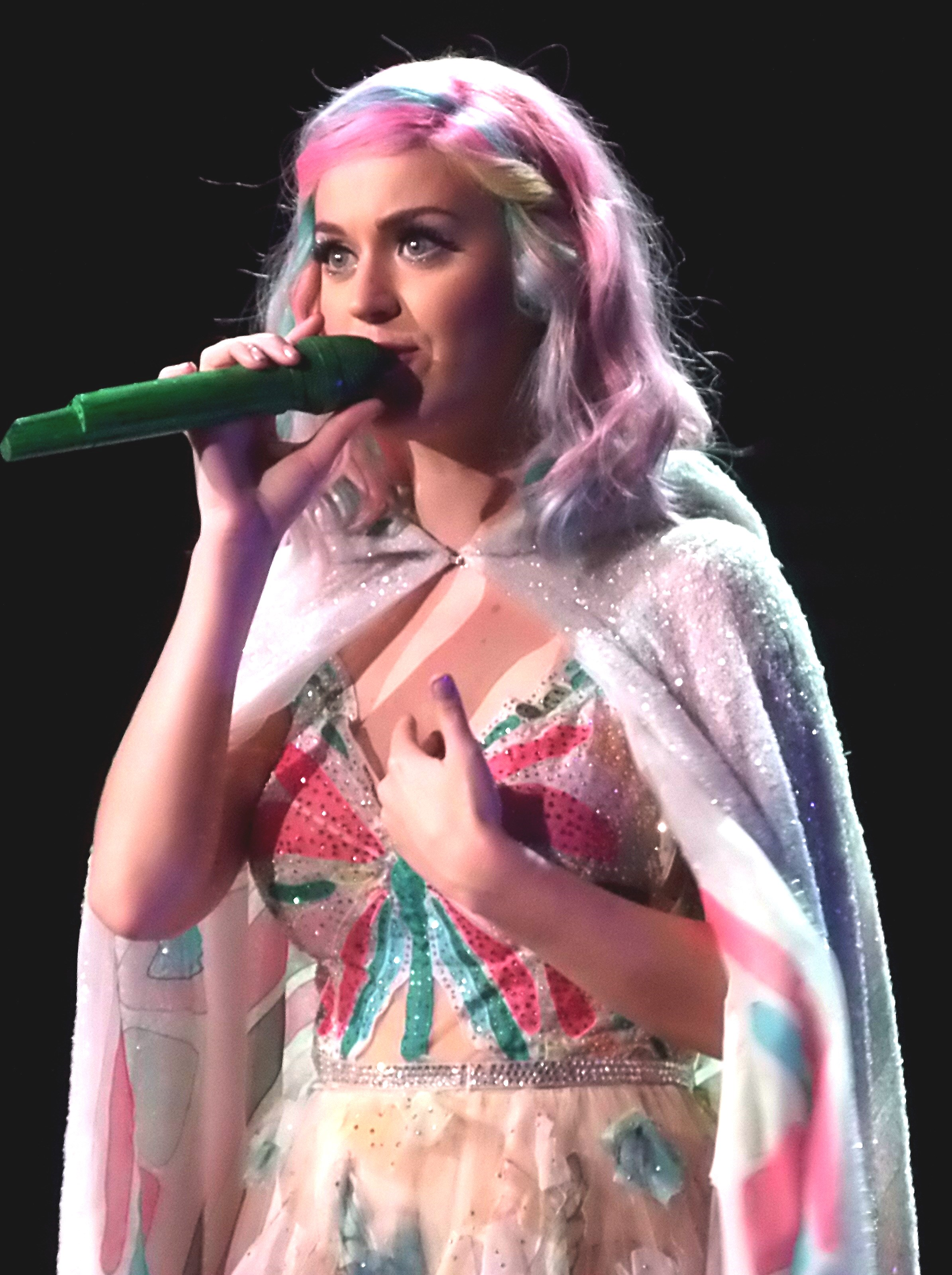
Perry at one of her shows during the Prismatic World Tour in July 2014

According to Pollstar, the Prismatic World Tour was the fourth best-selling tour in the world, and the best-selling by a solo female, in 2014, with a gross of $153 million and 1,407,972 attendees. The following year, the publication's mid-year report revealed that the tour grossed $35.7 million from 35 international dates in the first half of 2015. At the end of 2015, the Prismatic World Tour was the 27th best-selling globally, grossing $51 million from 43 dates.

Witness: The Tour, Perry's fourth concert tour, was the world's 77th best-selling tour in 2017. It grossed $28.1 million and had 266,300 attendees according to Pollstar. In March 2026, the publication ranked Perry ninth among the top touring female artists of the 21st century with a total gross of $461,563,109.

Year, name of the list, and result
Year	List	Result	Ref.
2011	Top Tours of the Year (North America)	23rd (California Dreams Tour)	
2011	Top Tours of the Year (Worldwide)	16th (California Dreams Tour)	
2014	Top Tours of the Year (Worldwide)	4th (Prismatic World Tour)	
2015	Top Tours of the Year (Worldwide)	27th (Prismatic World Tour)	
2015	Top Ticket Sales (Worldwide)	32nd (Prismatic World Tour)	
2017	Top Tours of the Year (North America)	50th (Witness: The Tour)	
2017	Top Tours of the Year (Worldwide)	77th (Witness: The Tour)	
2018	Top Tours of the Year (North America)	48th (Witness: The Tour)	
2018	Top Tours of the Year (Worldwide)	29th (Witness: The Tour)	

== Earnings ==
Perry is one of the wealthiest music artists. In September 2023, Forbes estimated her net worth at $340 million, which increased to $360 million by June 2025. Upon earning $135 million throughout 2015, she became the world's highest-paid female musician that year and set an all-time record. These earnings led to her gaining two Guinness records.

Name of the list, year(s) listed, and result
List	Year	Result	Ref.
30 Under 30 (Music)	2011	Placed	
30 Under 30 (Music)	2012	5th	
30 Under 30 (Music)	2013	6th	
30 Under 30 (Music)	2014	Placed	
America's Richest Self-Made Women	2024	Placed	
America's Richest Self-Made Women	2025	97th	
America's Richest Women Celebrities	2025	15th	
Celebrity 100	2011	12th	
Celebrity 100	2012	8th	
Celebrity 100	2013	18th	
Celebrity 100	2014	9th	
Celebrity 100	2015	3rd	
Celebrity 100	2016	63rd	
Celebrity 100	2017	95th	
Celebrity 100	2018	19th	
Celebrity 100	2019	41st	
Celebrity 100	2020	86th	
Hollywood's Highest-Paid Women	2011	8th	
Hollywood's Highest-Paid Women	2012	9th	
World's Highest-Paid Female Musicians	2011	3rd	
World's Highest-Paid Female Musicians	2012	5th	
World's Highest-Paid Female Musicians	2013	7th	
World's Highest-Paid Female Musicians	2014	5th	
World's Highest-Paid Female Musicians	2015	1st	
World's Highest-Paid Female Musicians	2016	6th	
World's Highest-Paid Female Musicians	2017	9th	
World's Highest-Paid Female Musicians	2018	1st	
World's Highest-Paid Female Musicians	2019	4th	
World's Highest-Paid Female Musicians	2020	8th	
World's Highest-Paid Musicians	2011	14th	
World's Highest-Paid Musicians	2012	15th	
World's Highest-Paid Musicians	2013	23rd	
World's Highest-Paid Musicians	2014	23rd	
World's Highest-Paid Musicians	2015	1st	
World's Highest-Paid Musicians	2016	25th	
World's Highest-Paid Musicians	2018	5th	
World's Highest-Paid Musicians	2019	13th	
World's Highest-Paid Musicians of the 2010s	2019	9th	
World's Richest Female Musicians	2024	8th	
Greatest Living Self-Made Americans	2026	226th	

== Miscellaneous ==
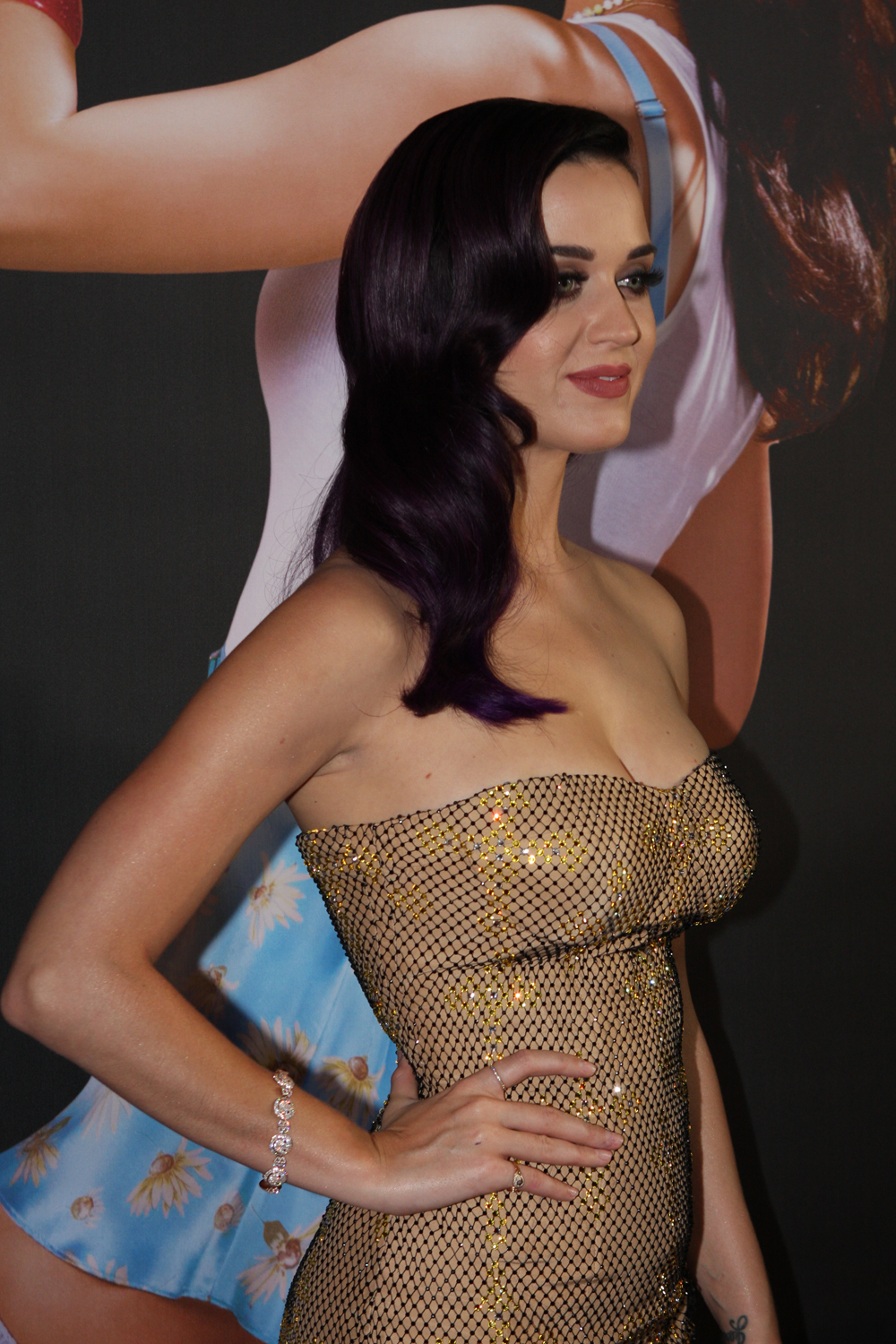
Perry at the premiere of Part of Me in Australia in June 2012

In its opening weekend in July 2012, Perry's documentary concert film Katy Perry: Part of Me grossed $7,138,266 in 2,730 theaters in the United States and Canada, ranking eighth at the box office. The film has grossed $25,326,071 in the United States and Canada as well as $7,400,885 in other territories, totaling $32,726,956 worldwide. Within the United States, it is the seventh highest-grossing documentary and the fifth highest-grossing music concert film of all time. In September of that year, the DVD for Katy Perry: Part of Me was released, selling 140,342 copies and generating a profit of $1.985 million within the first month in the United States. Moreover, the 3D Blu-ray sold over 40,000 copies within two weeks of release.

In 2014, HuffPost Canada reported that Perry earned 24.7 million Facebook likes, 27 million Twitter followers, 9.5 million Instagram followers, and three billion YouTube views, making her the most prominent social media user at that time. As of January 2026, she ranked third among the most followed musicians on X with over 85 million followers, and ranked 22nd among the most followed Instagram users with more than 205 million followers. Overall, Perry was the sixth most followed musician on social media with a combined total of over 357 million followers across Facebook, Instagram, and X. In 2025, she was ranked the 11th most famous pop artist by YouGov during the fourth quarter of the year.

=== Luminate index ===
The Luminate index uses audience, social media data, and exclusive Luminate data used on Billboard charts to rank the most influential music artists every quarter of the year.

Year	Luminate Index	Result	Ref.
2024	Third quarter	17th	
2024	Fourth quarter	29th	
2025	First quarter	27th	
2025	Second quarter	25th	
2025	Third quarter	27th	
2025	Fourth quarter	26th	

== Critic rankings and listicles ==
Name of publication, year(s) listed, critic ranking or listicle, and result
Publication	Year	Critic ranking or listicle	Result	Ref.
4Music	—	World's Greatest Music Videos of the 21st Century	6th ("Last Friday Night (T.G.I.F.)")	
4Music	2012	Most Influential Pop Stars of the Year	17th	
4Music	2013	Most Influential Pop Stars of the Year	4th	
4Music	2014	Most Influential Pop Stars of the Year	4th	
4Music	2015	Most Influential Pop Stars of the Year	6th	
4Music	2017	Most Influential Pop Stars of the Year	16th	
AARP	2020	Best Summer Songs	Placed ("California Gurls" (featuring Snoop Dogg))	
AARP	2021	Best Super Bowl Halftime Shows of All Time	8th (Super Bowl XLIX halftime show)	
ABC News	2011	Barbara Walters' 10 Most Fascinating People	Placed	
ABC News	2019	Best Super Bowl Halftime Shows of All Time	Placed (Super Bowl XLIX halftime show)	
Access Hollywood	2010	Best Albums of the Year: Staff Picks	Placed (Teenage Dream)	
Access Hollywood	2010	Best Songs of the Year	Placed ("California Gurls" (featuring Snoop Dogg))	
Access Hollywood	2010	Best Songs of the Year	Placed ("Teenage Dream")	
Access Hollywood	2010	Best Songs of the Year	Placed ("Firework")	
American Songwriter	2025	Best Country and Pop Collaborations of the Last 10 Years	Placed ("Where We Started" (Thomas Rhett featuring Perry))	
Associated Press	2019	Best Albums of the 2010s	9th (Teenage Dream)	
The Athletic	2026	Best Super Bowl Halftime Shows of All Time	8th (Super Bowl XLIX halftime show)	
Athlon Sports	2023	Best Super Bowl Halftime Shows of All Time	17th (Super Bowl XLIX halftime show)	
BBC	—	Best Pop and Hip-hop Collaborations	Placed ("E.T." (featuring Kanye West))	
BBC	2020	Best Super Bowl Halftime Shows of All Time	5th (Super Bowl XLIX halftime show)	
Billboard	2015	Best Songs Released in the First Half of the 2010s	2nd ("Teenage Dream")	
Billboard	2016	Greatest Olympic Anthems of All Time	4th ("Rise")	
Billboard	2017	Best Songs of the Year: Mid-Year Staff Picks	40th ("Chained to the Rhythm" (featuring Skip Marley))	
Billboard	2017	Best Deep Cuts by 21st Century Pop Stars: Critics' Picks	39th ("One of the Boys")	
Billboard	2017	Best Deep Cuts by 21st Century Pop Stars: Critics' Picks	74th ("International Smile")	
Billboard	2017	Best Songs of the Year: Critics' Picks	59th ("Feels" (Calvin Harris featuring Pharrell Williams, Perry, and Big Sean))	
Billboard	2017	Best Empowerment Songs	Placed ("Roar")	
Billboard	2018	Greatest Music Videos of the 21st Century: Critics' Picks	23rd ("California Gurls" (featuring Snoop Dogg))	
Billboard	2019	Best Songs of the Year: Mid-Year Staff Picks	48th ("Con Calma" (remix with Daddy Yankee featuring Snow))	
Billboard	2019	Best Albums of the 2010s: Staff Picks	14th (Teenage Dream)	
Billboard	2019	Songs That Defined the 2010s	Placed ("Teenage Dream")	
Billboard	2019	Greatest Music Videos of the 2010s: Staff Picks	21st ("California Gurls" (featuring Snoop Dogg))	
Billboard	2019	Best Songs of the Year: Staff Picks	25th ("Never Really Over")	
Billboard	2019	Best Songs of the Year: Staff Picks	57th ("Con Calma" (remix with Daddy Yankee featuring Snow))	
Billboard	2020	Best Summer Songs of the 21st Century: Critic's Picks	9th ("California Gurls" (featuring Snoop Dogg))	
Billboard	2020	Best Summer Songs of the 21st Century: Critic's Picks	16th ("I Kissed a Girl")	
Billboard	2020	Best COVID-19 Lockdown Music Videos	Placed ("Daisies")	
Billboard	2020	Greatest Music Video Artists of All Time: Staff Picks	78th	
Billboard	2020	Best Pop Songs of the Year: Staff Picks	Placed ("Daisies")	
Billboard	2021	Greatest Song Bridges of the 21st Century: Staff Picks	20th ("Teenage Dream")	
Billboard	2021	Greatest Song Bridges of the 21st Century: Staff Picks	59th ("Firework")	
Billboard	2022	Best love songs of the 21st Century: Staff Picks	11th ("Teenage Dream")	
Billboard	2023	Best Pop Songs of All Time	38th ("Teenage Dream")	
Billboard	2023	Best Pop Songs of All Time	321st ("Hot n Cold")	
Billboard	2024	Best Birthday Songs	26th ("Birthday")	
Billboard	2025	Key Billboard Chart Moments of the 21st Century	Placed (Perry tying Michael Jackson's record for most number-one singles from one album)	
Billboard	2025	Best Super Bowl Halftime Shows of All Time	12th (Super Bowl XLIX halftime show)	
Billboard	2025	Best Breakup Songs	50th ("The One That Got Away")	
Billboard	2025	Greatest LGBTQ+ Anthems of All Time	84th ("Firework")	
Billboard	2025	Best MTV Video Music Awards Winners for Video of the Year: Critic's Picks	41st ("Firework")	
Billboard	2025	Best Christmas Songs of the 21st Century: Staff Picks	20th ("Cozy Little Christmas")	
Blender	2008	Best Albums of the Year	19th (One of the Boys)	
Brandwatch	2016	Most Influential Women on Twitter	2nd	
Brandwatch	2017	Most Influential Women on Twitter	1st	
Brandwatch	2018	Most Influential Women on Twitter	2nd	
Brandwatch	2019	Most Influential People on Twitter	4th	
Brandwatch	2020	Most Influential People on Twitter	5th	
Brandwatch	2021	Most Influential People on Twitter	3rd	
Brandwatch	2022	Most Influential People on Twitter	3rd	
British GQ	2019	Best Christmas Songs of the Year	Placed ("Cozy Little Christmas")	
British GQ	2025	Best Pop Albums of the 21st Century	Placed (One of the Boys)	
Business Insider	2019	Best Songs of the 2010s	22nd ("Teenage Dream")	
Business Insider	2019	Best Music Videos of the Year	15th ("Never Really Over")	
Business Insider	2023	Most Iconic Music Videos of All Time	Placed ("California Gurls" (featuring Snoop Dogg))	
Bustle	2021	Best Christmas Songs	Placed ("Cozy Little Christmas")	
Capital	2019	Best New Songs from February 2019	10th ("365" (with Zedd))	
CBS News	2021	Best Super Bowl Halftime Shows of All Time	Placed (Super Bowl XLIX halftime show)	
Chart Attack	2008	Top Albums of the Year	Placed (One of the Boys)	
Clash	2014	Best Music Videos of the Year	Placed ("Dark Horse" (featuring Juicy J))	
Complex	2010	Best Songs of the Year	23rd ("Teenage Dream")	
Complex	2013	Best Pop Album Covers of the Past Five Years	16th (One of the Boys)	
Complex	2013	Best Pop Album Covers of the Past Five Years	42nd (Teenage Dream)	
Complex	2013	Best Songs of the Year: Staff Picks	Placed ("Birthday")	
Consequence	2010	Best Songs of the Year	5th ("Teenage Dream")	
Consequence	2019	Best Pop Songs of the 2010s	25th ("Firework")	
Consequence	2019	Best Albums of the 2010s	70th (Teenage Dream)	
Consequence	2019	Best Songs of the 2010s	95th ("Firework")	
Consequence	2022	Best Albums of the Last 15 Years	42nd (Teenage Dream)	
Cosmopolitan	2024	Best Christmas Songs	49th ("Cozy Little Christmas")	
Cosmopolitan UK	2017	Best Songs of the Year	20th ("Feels" (Calvin Harris featuring Pharrell Williams, Perry, and Big Sean))	
Cosmopolitan UK	2019	Best Halloween Songs	21st ("E.T." (featuring Kanye West))	
Country Living	2023	Best Summer Songs	20th ("California Gurls" (featuring Snoop Dogg))	
Country Living	2023	Best Christmas Songs	11th ("Cozy Little Christmas")	
Country Living	2025	Best Fourth of July Songs	46th ("Firework")	
Creative Review	2020	Best Music Videos of the Year	Placed ("Daisies" lyric video)	
The Daily Telegraph	2016	Best Women Anthems	Placed ("Roar")	
The Daily Telegraph	2025	Biggest Pop and Rock Concerts of the Year	Placed (The Lifetimes Tour)	
Drowned in Sound	2013	Best Songs of the Year	23rd ("Roar")	
Drowned in Sound	2014	Best Songs of the Year	Placed ("Double Rainbow")	
Drowned in Sound	2017	Best Albums of the Year	46th (Witness)	
E!	2020	Best Summer Songs	Placed ("California Gurls" (featuring Snoop Dogg))	
E!	2025	Best Super Bowl Halftime Shows	15th (Super Bowl XLIX halftime show)	
Elle	2017	Best Summer Songs of the Year	Placed ("Bon Appétit" (featuring Migos))	
Elle	2019	Best Songs of the 2010s	5th ("Teenage Dream")	
Entertainment Tonight	2022	Most Unforgettable Super Bowl Halftime Shows	9th (Super Bowl XLIX halftime show)	
Entertainment Weekly	2010	Most Powerful Entertainers	50th	
Entertainment Weekly	2013	Best Songs of the Year	5th ("Roar")	
Entertainment Weekly	2017	Best Songs of the Year	11th ("Swish Swish" (featuring Nicki Minaj))	
Entertainment Weekly	2025	Best Super Bowl Halftime Shows	14th (Super Bowl XLIX halftime show)	
The Fader	2017	Great Albums by Women	71st (Teenage Dream)	
The Fader	2019	Best Pop Songs	16th ("Small Talk")	
The Fader	2019	Best Pop Songs of the Year	17th ("Never Really Over")	
Forbes	2025	Best Super Bowl Halftime Shows of All Time	9th (Super Bowl XLIX halftime show)	
Fortune	2012	Most Powerful People on Twitter	3rd	
Glamour	2017	Best Summer Songs of the Year	Placed ("Bon Appétit" (featuring Migos))	
Glamour	2019	Women Who Defined 2010s Pop Culture	Placed	
Glamour	2020	Best Female Super Bowl Halftime Shows	Placed (Super Bowl XLIX halftime show)	
Glamour	2020	Best Songs of the Year	Placed ("Tucked")	
Glamour	2021	Best Halloween Songs	5th ("E.T.")	
Glamour	2022	Best Fourth of July Songs	Placed ("Firework")	
Glamour UK	2023	Best Women's Empowerment Songs	2nd ("Part of Me")	
Glamour UK	2023	Best Women's Empowerment Songs	8th ("Roar")	
Glamour UK	2025	Best Breakup Songs	4th ("The One That Got Away")	
Good Housekeeping	2024	Best Fourth of July Songs	6th ("California Gurls" (featuring Snoop Dogg))	
Good Housekeeping	2024	Best Fourth of July Songs	18th ("Firework")	
Good Housekeeping	2024	Best Modern Christmas Songs	5th ("Cozy Little Christmas")	
Good Housekeeping	2025	Best Pride Songs and LGBTQ+ Anthems	13th ("Firework")	
Good Housekeeping	2025	Best Halloween Songs	30th ("Dark Horse" (featuring Juicy J))	
Good Housekeeping UK	2015	Best Empowerment Songs	2nd ("Firework")	
Good Housekeeping UK	2020	Best Summer Songs	Placed ("California Gurls" (featuring Snoop Dogg))	
GQ UK	2025	Best Pop Albums of the 21st Century	Placed (One of the Boys)	
The Guardian	2010	Best Albums of the Year	Placed (Teenage Dream)	
The Guardian	2013	Best Albums of the Year	Placed (Prism)	
The Guardian	2017	Best Songs of the Year	Placed ("Swish Swish" (featuring Nicki Minaj))	
The Guardian	2017	Best Songs of the Year	Placed ("Bon Appétit" (featuring Migos))	
The Guardian	2017	Best Songs of the Year	Placed ("Chained to the Rhythm" (featuring Skip Marley))	
The Guardian	2017	Best Songs of the Year	Placed ("Feels" (Calvin Harris featuring Pharrell Williams, Perry, and Big Sean))	
The Guardian	2018	Greatest Super Bowl Halftime Shows	6th (Super Bowl XLIX halftime show)	
The Guardian	2019	Best Songs of the Year	Placed ("Never Really Over")	
Guinness World Records	2014	Most Powerful Pop Stars	4th	
Heart	2024	Best Halloween Songs	20th ("Dark Horse" (featuring Juicy J))	
The Hollywood Reporter	2013	Women in Entertainment Power 100	68th	
The Hollywood Reporter	2022	Biggest Celebrity Entrepreneurs of the Year	Placed	
HuffPost	2017	Best Women's Empowerment Songs	Placed ("Roar")	
HuffPost	2017	Greatest Debut Singles by Pop Divas	31st ("Ur So Gay")	
HuffPost	2017	Best Summer Songs of the Year: Staff Picks	Placed ("Feels" (Calvin Harris featuring Pharrell Williams, Perry, and Big Sean))	
LA Weekly	2017	Best Super Bowl Halftime Shows of All Time	4th (Super Bowl XLIX halftime show)	
LA Weekly	2019	Top LGBTQ Anthems of the 21st Century	6th ("Firework")	
The Line of Best Fit	2011	Best Songs of the Year	26th ("Last Friday Night (T.G.I.F.)")	
The Line of Best Fit	2013	Best Songs of the Year	28th ("Roar")	
The Line of Best Fit	2014	Best Songs of the Year	Placed ("Dark Horse" (featuring Juicy J))	
The Line of Best Fit	2017	Best Songs of the Year	42nd ("Swish Swish" (featuring Nicki Minaj))	
The Line of Best Fit	2018	Iconic Songs of 2008	5th ("I Kissed a Girl")	
Los Angeles Times	2019	Best Summer Songs of the 21st Century	3rd ("California Gurls" (featuring Snoop Dogg))	
Los Angeles Times	2019	Best Summer Songs of the 21st Century	10th ("I Kissed a Girl")	
Marie Claire Italy	2016	Best Songs for Running	11th ("Teenage Dream")	
Marie Claire Mexico	2025	Best Super Bowl Halftime Shows	Placed (Super Bowl XLIX halftime show)	
Marie Claire Russia	2024	Best Music Videos of the 2000s	Placed ("Hot n Cold")	
Marie Claire USA	2020	Best Halloween Songs	Placed ("Dark Horse" (featuring Juicy J))	
Marie Claire USA	2020	Best Halloween Songs	Placed ("E.T." (featuring Kanye West))	
Marie Claire USA	2025	Most Memorable Super Bowl Halftime Shows	Placed (Super Bowl XLIX halftime show)	
Mashable	2016	Best Olympic Anthems	Placed ("Rise")	
Mashable Southeast Asia	2025	Best Super Bowl Halftime Shows of All Time	Placed (Super Bowl XLIX halftime show)	
Men's Health	2022	Best Pop Love Songs	Placed ("Never Really Over")	
MTV	2008	Best Songs of the Year	33rd ("Hot n Cold")	
MTV	2008	Best Songs of the Year	6th (I Kissed a Girl)	
MTV	2010	Best Songs of the Year	11th ("Teenage Dream")	
MTV	2010	Best Albums of the Year	5th (Teenage Dream)	
MTV	2011	Best Artists of the Year	1st	
MTV	2011	Best Songs of the Year	10th ("Firework")	
MusicOMH	2013	Best Albums of the Year	95th (Prism)	
NBC Sports	2026	Best Super Bowl Halftime Shows of All Time	5th (Super Bowl XLIX halftime show)	
The New York Observer	2015	Favorite YouTube Videos	Placed ("Last Friday Night (T.G.I.F.)")	
The New York Observer	2017	Best Super Bowl Halftime Shows	Placed (Super Bowl XLIX halftime show)	
NME	—	Best Music Videos of 2010	22nd ("California Gurls" (featuring Snoop Dogg))	
NME	2017	Best Summer Songs of the Year	Placed ("Feels" (Calvin Harris featuring Pharrell Williams, Perry, and Big Sean))	
NME	2017	Best Songs of the Year	17th ("Chained to the Rhythm" (featuring Skip Marley))	
NPR	2018	Greatest Songs by 21st Century Women	63rd ("Teenage Dream")	
NPR	2018	Most Influential Female Musicians of the 21st Century	23rd	
Official Charts Company (OCC)	2018	Best Breakup Songs	Placed ("Part of Me")	
Official Charts Company (OCC)	2019	Favorite Songs of the Year: Staff Picks	Placed ("Never Really Over")	
Official Charts Company (OCC)	2021	Best Songs of the Year: Mid-Year Staff Picks	Placed ("Electric")	
Oprah Daily	2022	Best Women's Empowerment Songs	12th ("Roar")	
Oregon Public Broadcasting	2010	Best Albums of the Year: Staff Picks	Placed (Teenage Dream)	
Parade	2019	Best Songs of the 2010s	5th ("Teenage Dream")	
Parade	2024	Best Birthday Songs	5th ("Birthday")	
Paste	2019	Best Pop Albums of the 2010s	16th (Teenage Dream)	
Paste	2023	Best Number-One Songs of 2013	5th ("Roar")	
Paste	2025	Greatest Albums of the 21st Century	179th (Teenage Dream)	
People	2023	Best Christmas Songs	Placed ("Cozy Little Christmas")	
Pitchfork	2008	Best Songs of the Year	Placed ("Hot n Cold")	
Pitchfork	2013	Best Songs of the Year	Placed ("Birthday")	
Pitchfork	2014	Best Songs of the First Half of 2010s	35th ("Teenage Dream")	
Pitchfork	2019	Best Songs of the 2010s	102nd ("Teenage Dream")	
Popjustice	2010	Best Albums of the Year	21st (Teenage Dream)	
Radio.com	2013	Best Albums of the Year	9th (Prism)	
Reader's Digest	2024	Best Happy Songs	Placed ("Roar")	
The Recording Academy	2025	Iconic Album Covers of All Time	Placed (Teenage Dream)	
Refinery29	2018	Most Popular Christmas Songs of the Year	Placed ("Cozy Little Christmas")	
Revolt	2024	Best Pop Songs with a Rap Verse	7th ("Swish Swish" (featuring Nicki Minaj))	
Revolt	2024	Best Pop Songs with a Rap Verse	9th ("Dark Horse" (featuring Juicy J))	
Rolling Stone	2010	Best Songs of the Year	4th ("Teenage Dream")	
Rolling Stone	2013	Best Songs of the Year	18th ("Roar")	
Rolling Stone	2014	Best Summer Songs of the 2010s	Placed ("Last Friday Night (T.G.I.F.)")	
Rolling Stone	2014	Best Summer Songs of the 2010s	Placed ("California Gurls" (featuring Snoop Dogg))	
Rolling Stone	2018	Greatest Songs of the Century	62nd ("Teenage Dream")	
Rolling Stone	2020	Best New Albums	Placed (Smile)	
Rolling Stone	2023	Most Inspirational LGBTQ+ Songs of All Time	3rd ("Firework")	
Rolling Stone	2024	Best Super Bowl Halftime Shows of All Time	12th (Super Bowl XLIX halftime show)	
Rolling Stone	2025	Greatest Albums of the 21st Century	134th (Teenage Dream)	
Rolling Stone	2025	Greatest Songs of the 21st Century	55th ("Teenage Dream")	
Rolling Stone India	2019	Best Albums of the 2010s	43rd (Teenage Dream)	
Rolling Stone India	2022	Iconic Feminist Anthems	Honorable Mention ("Roar")	
Rolling Stone Italia	2014	Best Songs of the Year	Placed ("Dark Horse" (featuring Juicy J))	
Seventeen	2017	Best Songs of the Year	Placed ("Chained to the Rhythm" (featuring Skip Marley))	
Seventeen	2023	Best Birthday Songs	6th ("Birthday")	
Seventeen	2023	Best Halloween Songs	Placed ("E.T." (featuring Kanye West))	
SiriusXM	2024	Best Party Songs of All Time	102nd ("Hot n Cold")	
SiriusXM	2024	Best Halloween Songs	20th ("Dark Horse" (featuring Juicy J))	
Slant Magazine	2017	Best Music Videos of the Year	22nd ("Chained to the Rhythm" (featuring Skip Marley))	
Slant Magazine	2020	Best Music Videos of the 2010s	95th ("Chained to the Rhythm" (featuring Skip Marley))	
Spin	2010	Best Summer Songs	Placed ("California Gurls" (featuring Snoop Dogg))	
Spin	2014	Best Songs of the Year	16th ("Birthday")	
Spotify	2026	Greatest Pop Songs of the Streaming Era	65th ("Never Really Over")	
Stereogum	2017	Favorite Songs of the Year	Placed ("Chained to the Rhythm" (featuring Skip Marley))	
Stereogum	2017	Best Pop Songs of the Year	40th ("Chained to the Rhythm" (featuring Skip Marley))	
Stereogum	2019	Best Songs of the 2010s	32nd ("Teenage Dream")	
Stereogum	2019	Best Songs of the Year	Placed ("Never Really Over")	
Tampa Bay Times	2019	Best Pop Songs of the Year	3rd ("Never Really Over")	
Tampa Bay Times	2019	Best Albums of the 2010s	5th (Teenage Dream)	
Teen Vogue	2022	Best Breakup Songs	92nd ("The One That Got Away")	
Teen Vogue	2022	Best Breakup Songs	113th ("Part of Me")	
TheWrap	2017	Best Super Bowl Halftime Shows of All Time	8th (Super Bowl XLIX halftime show)	
Time	2017	Most Influential People on the Internet	Placed	
Time Out	2022	Best Birthday Songs	14th ("Birthday")	
Time Out	2025	Best Inspirational Songs	14th ("Roar")	
Time Out Dubai	2021	Best Inspirational Songs	11th ("Roar")	
The Times of India	2025	Most Controversial Music Videos	5th ("Dark Horse" (featuring Juicy J))	
Today	2023	Best Birthday Songs	Placed ("Birthday")	
Today	2025	Best Summer Songs	Placed ("California Gurls" (featuring Snoop Dogg))	
Today	2025	Best Summer Songs	Placed ("Teenage Dream")	
Today	2025	Best Summer Songs	Placed ("Last Friday Night (T.G.I.F.)")	
Today	2025	Best Fourth of July Songs	Placed ("Firework")	
Uproxx	2019	Best Songs of the 2010s	60th ("Teenage Dream")	
Uproxx	2019	Best Pop Albums of the 2010s	1st (Teenage Dream)	
Uproxx	2019	Influential Pop Music Videos	Placed ("California Gurls" (featuring Snoop Dogg))	
USA Today	2017	Best Summer Songs	13th ("California Gurls" (featuring Snoop Dogg))	
USA Today	2017	Best Summer Songs	19th ("I Kissed a Girl")	
USA Today	2019	Best Pop Albums of All Time	29th (Teenage Dream)	
USA Today	2019	Best Summer Songs of the 2010s	Placed ("California Gurls" (featuring Snoop Dogg))	
USA Today	2020	Best Musicians of the 2010s	Placed	
USA Today	2025	Best Songs by Female Artists of All Time	22nd ("Firework")	
USA Today	2025	Biggest Tours of the Year	Placed (The Lifetimes Tour)	
Vanity Fair Italy	2020	Best MTV Unplugged Albums of All Time	10th (MTV Unplugged)	
Variety	2017	Variety500: Top Entertainment Business Leaders	Placed	
Vevo	2017	Best Pop Music Videos of the Year	6th ("Chained to the Rhythm" (featuring Skip Marley))	
Vevo	2017	Best Pop Music Videos of the Year	8th ("Swish Swish" (featuring Nicki Minaj))	
Vevo	2017	Best Pop Music Videos of the Year	10th ("Bon Appétit" (featuring Migos))	
VH1	2008	Top Pop Music Videos of the Year	Placed ("I Kissed a Girl")	
VH1	2008	Top Music Videos of the Year	Placed ("I Kissed a Girl")	
VH1	2010	Top Music Videos of the Year	3rd ("California Gurls" (featuring Snoop Dogg))	
VH1	2010	Top Music Videos of the Year	20th ("Firework")	
VH1	2011	Top Music Videos of the Year	3rd ("E.T." (featuring Kanye West))	
VH1	2011	Top Music Videos of the Year	14th ("Last Friday Night (T.G.I.F.)")	
VH1	2011	Greatest Songs of the 2000s	43rd ("I Kissed a Girl")	
VH1	2012	Greatest Women in Music	17th	
VH1	2013	Top Music Videos of the Year	4th ("Roar")	
VH1	2014	Biggest Videos of the Year	13th ("Dark Horse" (featuring Juicy J))	
VH1	2015	Most Important Pop Albums of the Last 10 Years	1st (Teenage Dream)	
The Village Voice	2011	The 38th Pazz & Jop Critics' Poll	14th ("Teenage Dream")	
Vulture	2014	Best Songs of the Year	10th ("Birthday")	
Vulture	2025	Best Super Bowl Halftime Shows	6th (Super Bowl XLIX halftime show)	
XXL	2016	Best Hip-hop and Pop Collaborations	Placed ("E.T." (featuring Kanye West))	
XXL	2016	Best Hip-hop and Pop Collaborations	Placed ("Dark Horse" (featuring Juicy J))	
XXL	2016	Best Hip-hop and Pop Collaborations	Placed ("California Gurls" (featuring Snoop Dogg))	
Yahoo! Entertainment	2024	Best Halloween Songs	Placed ("Dark Horse" (featuring Juicy J))	
Yahoo! Entertainment	2024	Best Halloween Songs	Placed ("E.T.")	
Yardbarker	2024	Best Birthday Songs	2nd ("Birthday")	
Yardbarker	2025	Best Hip-hop and Pop Collaborations	7th ("California Gurls" (featuring Snoop Dogg))	
Yardbarker	2025	Best Hip-hop and Pop Collaborations	17th ("Dark Horse" (featuring Juicy J))	
Yardbarker	2025	Best Pop Songs of the 2010s	14th ("California Gurls" (featuring Snoop Dogg))	
Yardbarker	2025	Best Pop Albums of the 2000s	29th (One of the Boys)	

== See also ==
- Katy Perry discography
- List of awards and nominations received by Katy Perry
