= Deirdre McSharry =

British magazine editor (1932–2026)

- Born: 4 April 1932; West Ham, London, England
- Died: 14 August 2026 (aged 94)
- Occupation: Magazine editor
- Spouse(s): Linton Stone, Peter King, Ian Smyth

Deirdre Mary McSharry (4 April 1932 – 14 August 2026) was a British actress, model, journalist and editor. She was notably editor of Cosmopolitan in the UK from 1973 when it became a British iconic magazine which occasionally, and notably, featured nude male models.

== Life ==
McSharry was born in London where her father, Dr Jack McSharry, cared for his patients who had tuberculosis. Her father died from that disease and her mother, Mary (born O'Brien), moved to Dublin where McSharry was schooled in a convent. Her mother became the editor of the magazine Woman’s Life.

McSharry was encouraged by her ambitious mother to paint and write. She never completed university but took to acting including a tour in Egypt. After her first brief marriage she started her journalistic career in New York with Women's Wear Daily.

She returned to the UK where she was appointed the fashion editor of the Daily Express. During a photo shoot she was credited with discovering Twiggy who became a super model.

She was initially the fashion editor of Cosmopolitan when it launched in 1972, but the following year she became its editor. The magazine never referred to women as wives but as women. The occasional male nude models was good marketing but it was intended to mirror the way Playboy featured women. The target reader was a woman in her twenties who might have a baby but who wanted to return to her career.

As the editor of Cosmopolitan in the UK and then Country Living, she was awarded editor of the year by the Professional Publishers Association in 1981 and 1987, respectively.

McSharry died on 14 August 2026, aged 94.
