= Maurice Newman (artist) =

American painter

- Born: Panevėžys, Lithuania
- Died: February 17, 1977 (aged 78); Alexandria, Virginia
- Occupations: model maker and artist
- Years active: 1923-1977

Maurice Newman was a painter, sculptor, model maker and photographer. He was the son of Abraham Newman and Tobi Schmukler, and was born in Lithuania in 1898. He was married to Edythe Brenda Tichell from 1930 to his death in 1977. He had one daughter, Rachel Newman.

In his teens, Newman left Lithuania to live in Switzerland, and acted as a messenger, delivering messages between clandestine lovers; he spoke Russian, Lithuanian, Polish, German and Yiddish. He then lived in England and South Africa, attending the National School of Arts in Johannesburg. In the early 1920s, Newman migrated to the U.S., lived in Boston, and worked in the Newton offices of the Bachrach Studios. After a brief stint as a retoucher at the White Studios in New York City, he returned to Boston to work as a commercial artist while attending the Vesper George School of Art, the School of the Museum of Fine Arts (now the School of the Museum of Fine Arts at Tufts), and the Woodbury School of Art.

In 1940, Newman was employed as a model maker by Federal Works of Art Passive Defense Project (Federal Art Project). In 1942 he relocated to Alexandria Virginia as a civilian Army employee to head the model shop in the United States Army Engineer Research and Development Laboratory at Fort Belvoir. During World War II, he constructed dioramas and topographical bombing maps. Following the war, projects shifted to the Cold War and civil defense.

In retirement, Newman was able to fully devote his time to portrait painting, as well as sculptures in wood and aluminum. His aluminum sculpture, one of the first U.S. memorials to the six million Jews martyred by Hitler, was unveiled in 1963 at the Kansas City, Missouri Jewish Community Center; the keynote speaker at the unveiling was former President Harry S. Truman. His dioramas and miniatures were exhibited at the Boston Children's Museum, 1939 New York World's Fair and the Peabody Essex Museum.
