= Rachel Newman (editor) =

American magazine editor and artist

- Born: May 1, 1938 (age 86); Boston, Massachusetts, U.S.
- Occupation(s): magazine editor and artist
- Years active: 1970-present

Rachel Newman (born May 1, 1938) is an American magazine editor and artist, daughter of Maurice Newman and Edythe Brenda Tichell. She was raised in Massachusetts and Virginia, and currently resides in New York City.

== Publishing career ==
After graduating from Pennsylvania State University, Newman received certification from the New York School of Interior Design. She worked in advertising and then publishing, creating numerous magazines for Hearst Communications. Country Living was conceived by her mentor, John Mack Carter, to create a view of Early American and period homes echoing the architectural and furniture styles brought to the U.S. by early European settlers. Carter selected Newman to run the magazine, and during her 20-year stint she made several television appearances and was considered a "master" of her profession. Advertising Age listed Country Living as the hottest magazine 5 years in a row (1993-1997). She eventually shifted from the Country Living family of magazines to start Healthy living magazine, which was designed to support the growing interest in natural and alternative medicine; during that period, she also served on the board of Mothers and Others for a Livable Planet.

Newman's affiliations include the American Society of Magazine Editors and the American Society of Interior Designers. Her achievements were recognized by the International Furnishings Design Association (Circle of Excellence, 1992, now known as the IFDA's Honorary Recognition Award), the YMCA (Hall of Fame, 1992), Pennsylvania State University (distinguished alumna, 1998, and alumni fellow, 1986) and Who's Who (Finance and Business, East, American Women). Magazines that Newman ran include:

- Country Living, editor emeritus (1999 to present) and editor-in-chief (1978–98)
- Healthy Living, founding editor (1996-2000)
- Country Living Gardener, founding editor (1993-2000)
- Country Kitchens, founding editor (1990–93)
- Dream Homes, founding editor (1989-2000)
- Country Cooking, founding editor (1985–90)
- Good Housekeeping, home building and decorating editor (1978–82)
- American Home Crafts, editor-in-chief (1972–77)
- Ladies Home Journal Needle and Craft, managing editor (1970–72)

== Artist ==
Newman's father was an artist and she has studied art throughout her life, starting at the Corcoran Gallery of Art. Since retiring from publishing, she studies landscape painting at Etruscan Places in Italy, and classical drawing and painting at the Grand Central Atelier in New York. Her pieces can be found in private collections in the Americas and Italy. She is represented by the Phyllis Lucas Gallery/Old Print Center in New York City.

== Personal life ==
Newman married Herb Bleiweiss in 1973. Bleiweiss was an art director at McCall's and Ladies Home Journal, where they met. They were divorced in 1989. Newman's Tuscan home was featured in the 25th anniversary edition of Country Living. She married Michael Lucas, a political scientist and the owner of the Phyllis Lucas Gallery, in 2004.
