= Billboard Decade-End =

Decade-end rankings published by Billboard

Billboard Decade-End is a series of music charts reflecting the most popular artists, albums, and songs in the United States throughout a decade. Billboard first published their first decade-end rankings in December 1970, listing the artists with the most number ones of the 1960s. The Beatles was named the Top Pop LP Artist of the Decade and the Top Pop Singles Artist of the Decade. In the 1980s, Billboard decade-end rankings were based on the magazine reader's votes, with Madonna becoming the Pop Artist of the Decade. In December 1999, Billboard published decade-end lists based on statistical performances on weekly Billboard charts, with Mariah Carey being dubbed the Pop Artist of Decade. Other artists receiving the honor in the following decades are Eminem (2000s) and Drake (2010s).

== 1960s ==
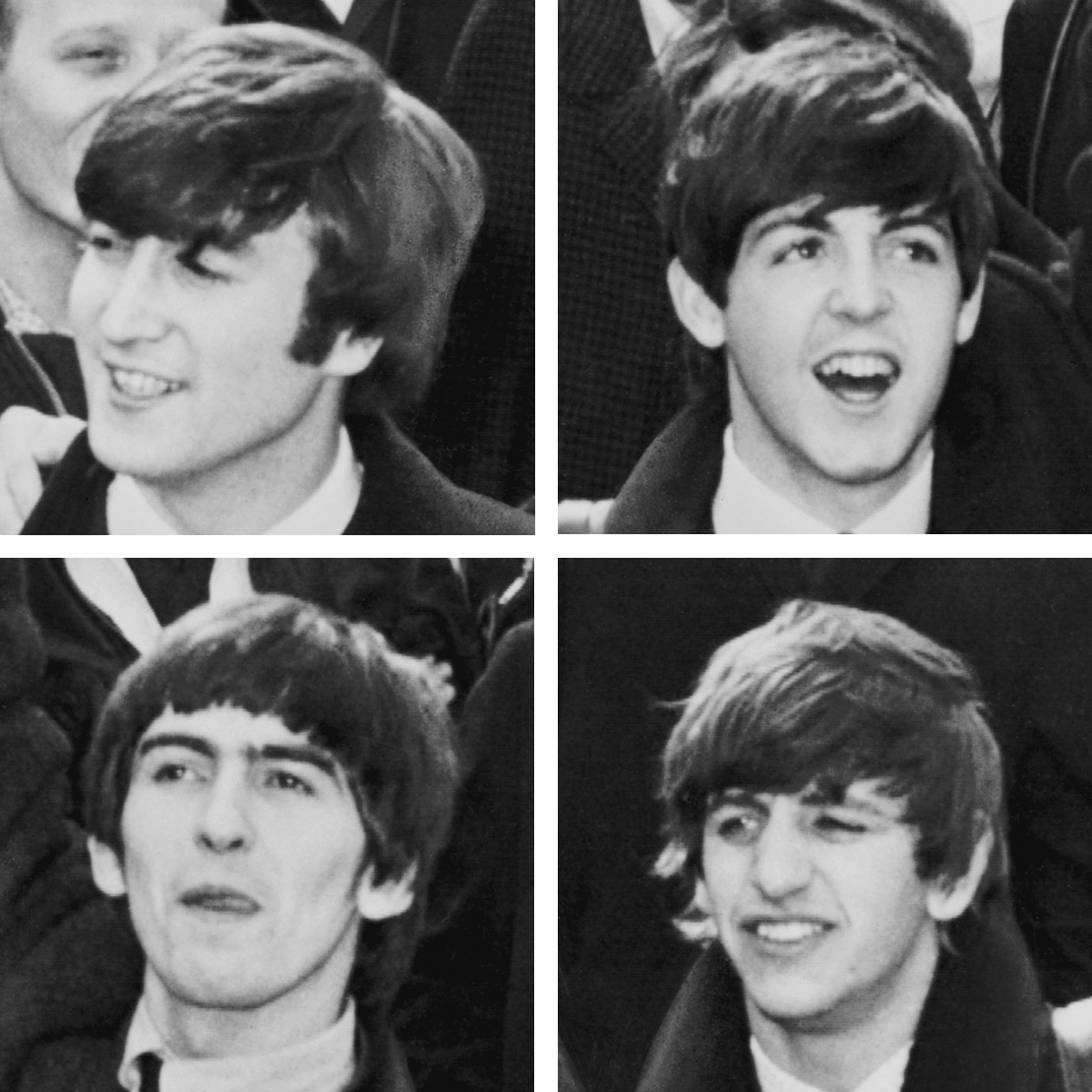
The Beatles was named the Top Pop LP and Singles Artist of the Decade (1960s)

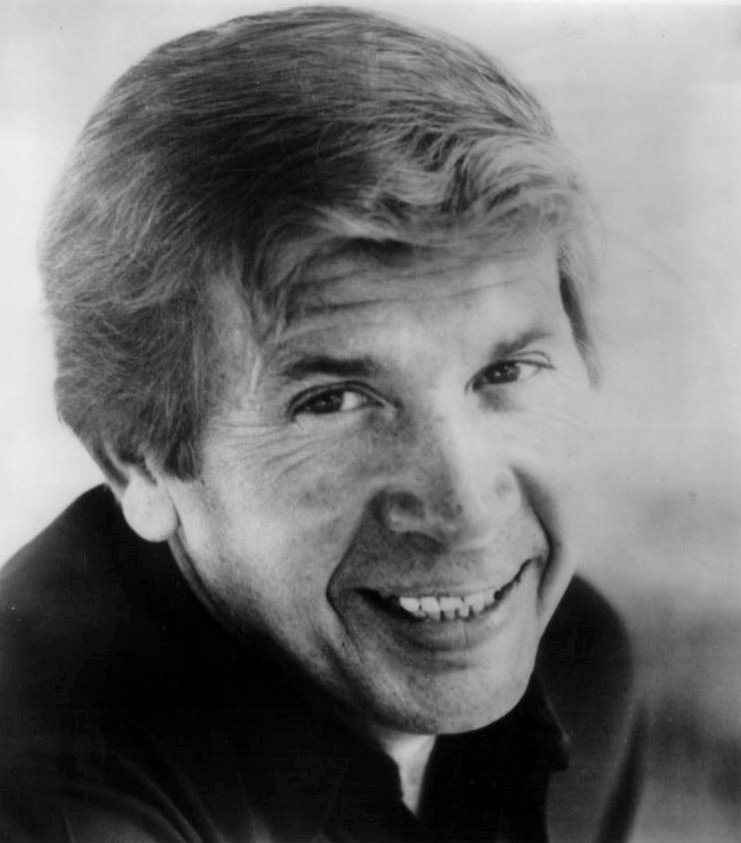
Buck Owens was named the Top Country LP and Singles Artist of the Decade (1960s)

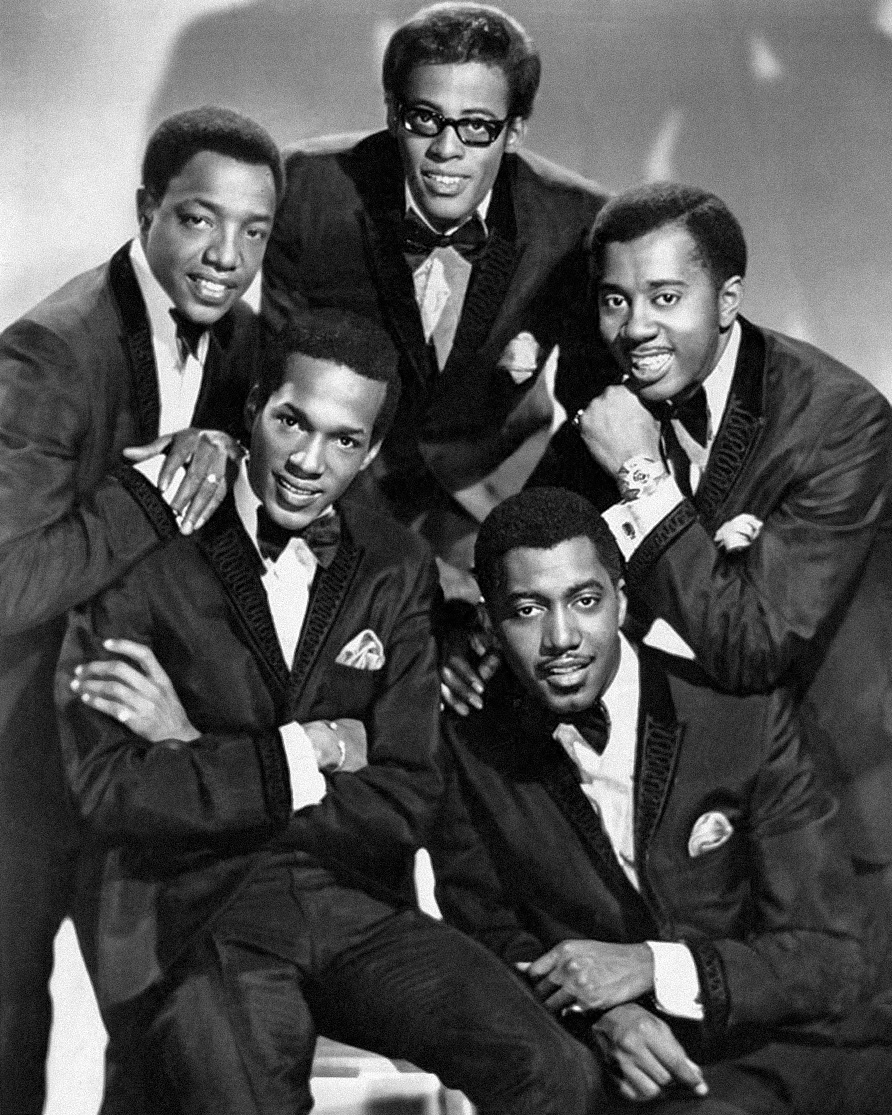
The Temptations was named the Top Soul LP Artist of the Decade (1960s)

List of artists of the 1960s decade (most number ones)
Category	LP Artist of the Decade	Singles Artist of the Decade
Pop	The Beatles	The Beatles
Country	Buck Owens	Buck Owens
Soul	The Temptations	James Brown

== 1980s ==
In December 1989, Billboard published their lists of most popular artists, albums, and songs of the 1980s decade in various genres. The magazine readers submitted their votes through the December 23, 1989 edition of the magazine. A trophy was given to the winner of each categories. At the 55th anniversary of the Billboard Hot 100 in 2013, Billboard retrospectively named Madonna the Artist of the 1980s based on the chart performance during the decade. In 2019, Billboard also named "Physical" by Olivia Newton-John as the Top Song of the 1980s based on an inverse point system on the Hot 100 chart.

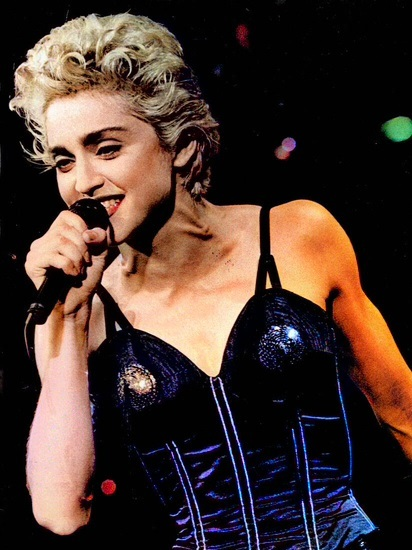
Madonna was named the Pop Artist of the Decade (1980s)

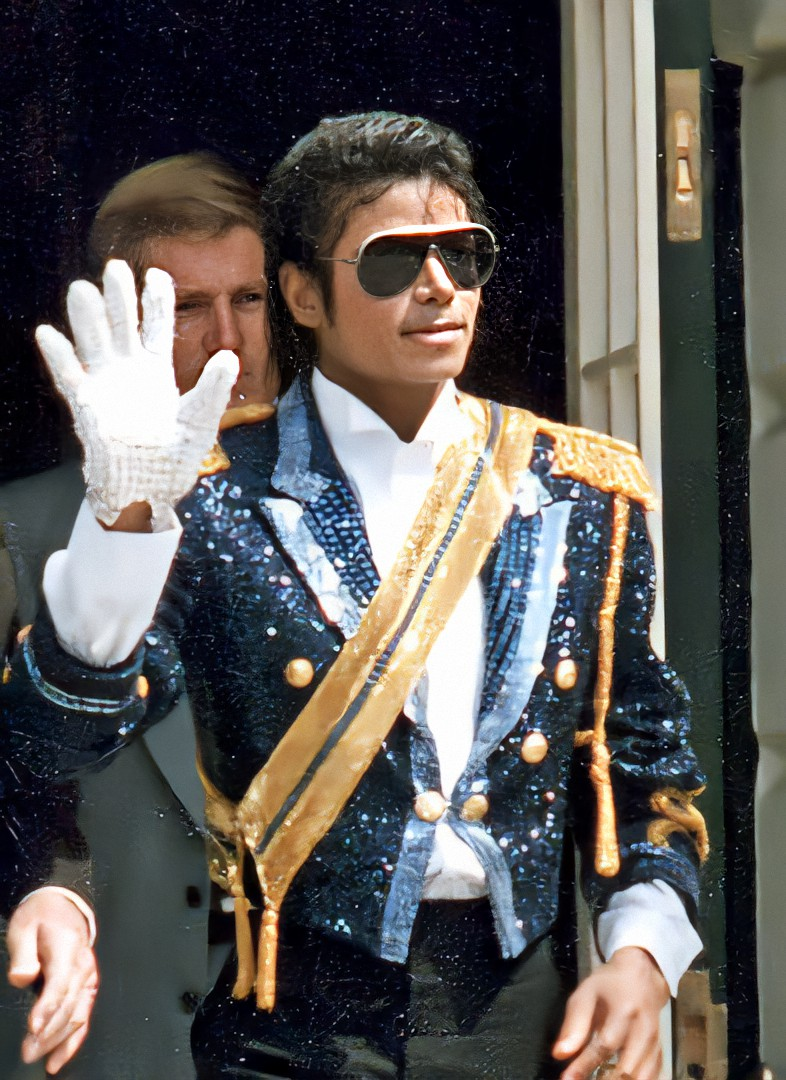
Michael Jackson's Thriller was named the Pop Album of the Decade (1980s)

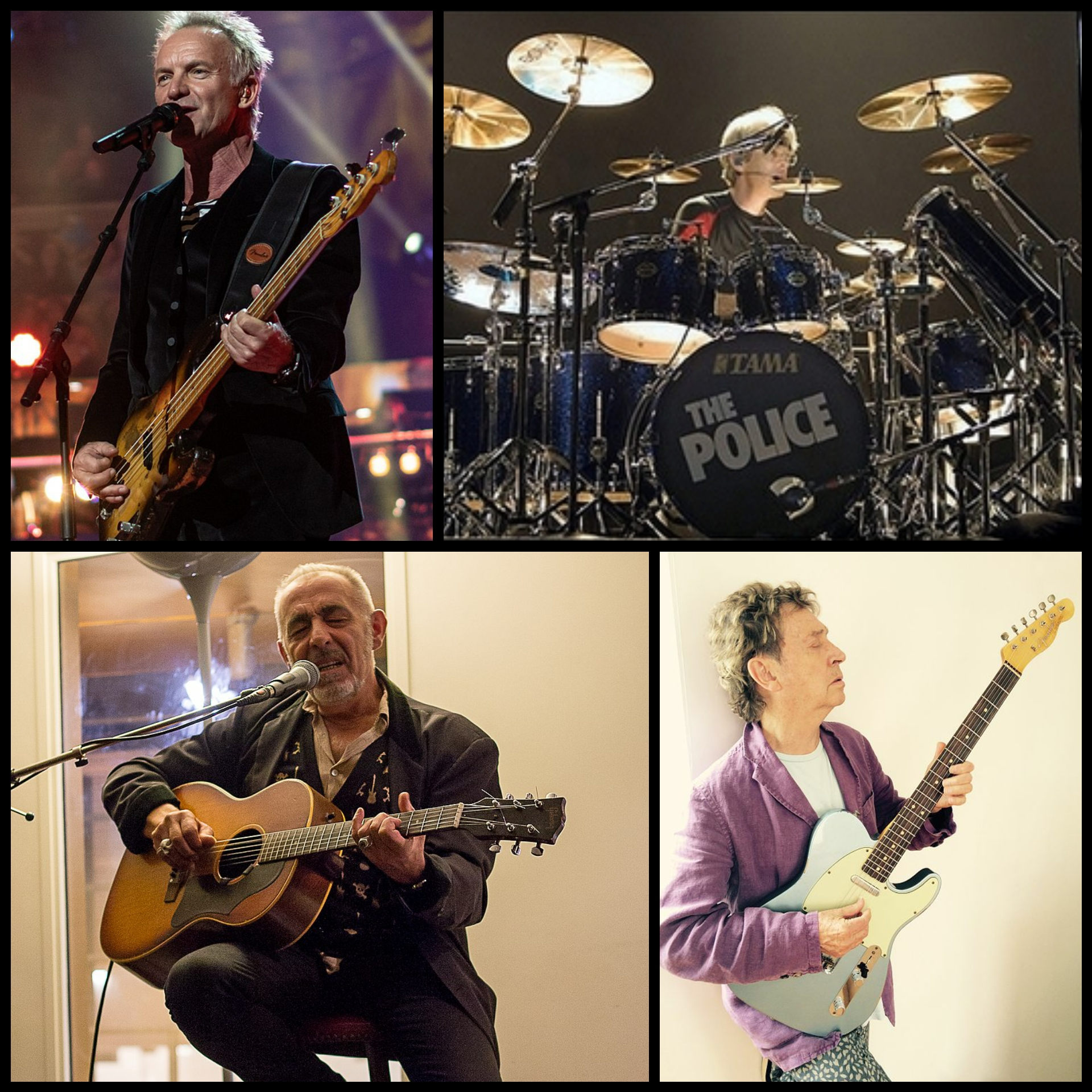
The Police's "Every Breath You Take" was named the Pop Single of the Decade (1980s)

List of artists, albums, and singles of the 1980s decade (popular voting)
Category	Artist of the Decade	Album of the Decade	Single of the Decade
Pop	Madonna	Thriller by Michael Jackson	"Every Breath You Take" by The Police
Dance	Madonna	—	"Into the Groove" by Madonna
Black	Michael Jackson	Thriller by Michael Jackson	"Billie Jean" by Michael Jackson
Adult Contemporary	Lionel Richie	—	"That's What Friends Are For" by Dionne Warwick & friends
Gospel	Amy Grant	Age to Age by Amy Grant	—
Jazz	Kenny G	Duotones by Kenny G	—
Country	Alabama	Always & Forever by Randy Travis	"Always on My Mind" by Willie Nelson
Classical	Luciano Pavarotti	Horowitz in Moscow by Vladimir Horowitz	—

== 1990s ==
Mariah Carey accepted the trophy during the ceremony of the 1999 Billboard Music Awards held on December 8, 1999. In 2013, Billboard retrospectively named Carey the Hot 100 Artist of the 1990s based on the chart performance of her singles throughout the decade. "One Sweet Day", a duet by Mariah Carey and Boyz II Men, was named the Pop Single of the 1990s in the original issue. However, Billboard later published another two lists of top songs of the 1990s using different calculation, with "How Do I Live" by LeAnn Rimes topping the 2014 version and "Smooth" by Santana featuring Rob Thomas topping the 2019 version.

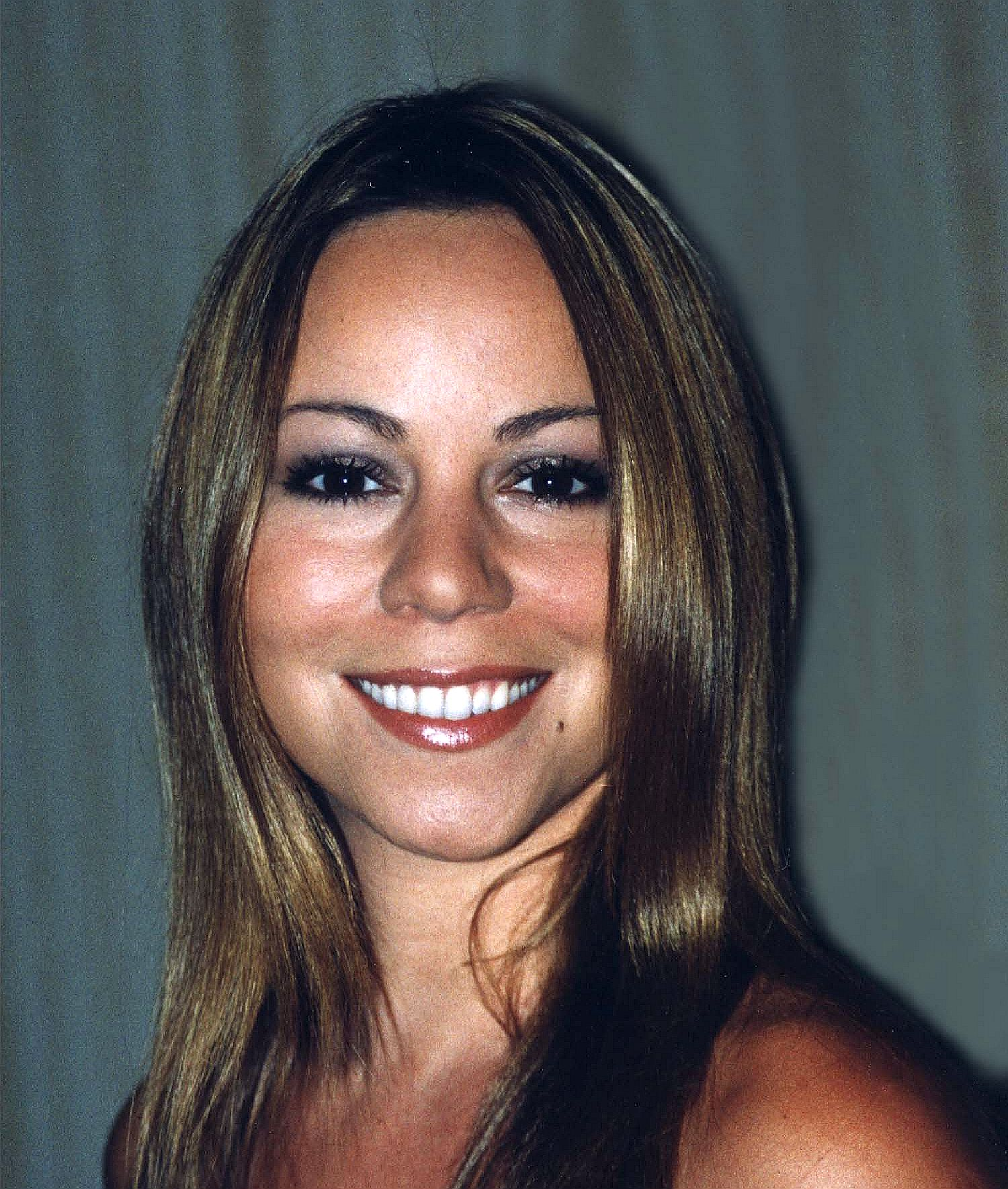
Mariah Carey was named the Pop Artist of the Decade (1990s)

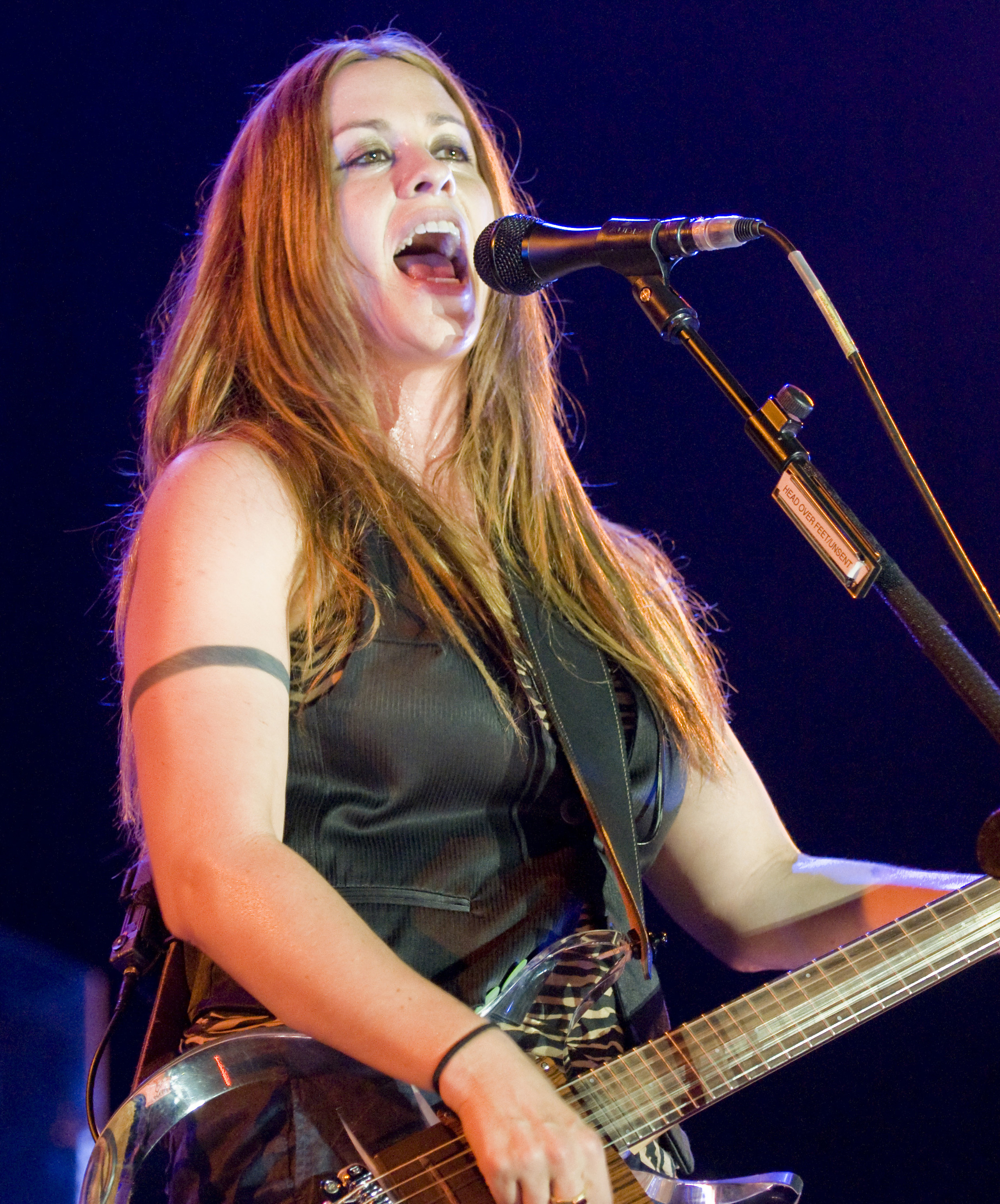
Alanis Morissette's Jagged Little Pill was named the Pop Album of the Decade (1990s)

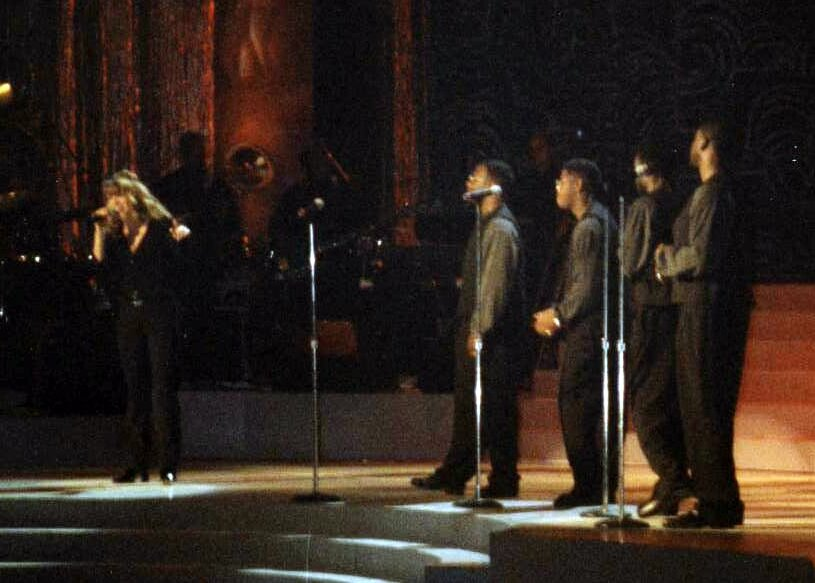
Mariah Carey and Boyz II Men's "One Sweet Day" was named the Hot 100 Single of the Decade (1990s)

List of artists, albums, and singles of the 1990s decade
Category	Artist of the Decade	Album of the Decade	Single of the Decade
Pop	Mariah Carey	Jagged Little Pill by Alanis Morissette	"One Sweet Day" by Mariah Carey and Boyz II Men
R&B/Hip-hop	Mariah Carey	—	—
Country	Garth Brooks	—	—
Latin	Selena	—	—

== 2000s ==
Eminem never accepted the trophy of the Artist of the Decade from the Billboard Music Awards due to the absence of the ceremony between 2007 and 2010.

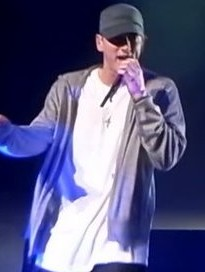
Eminem was named the Artist of the Decade (2000s)

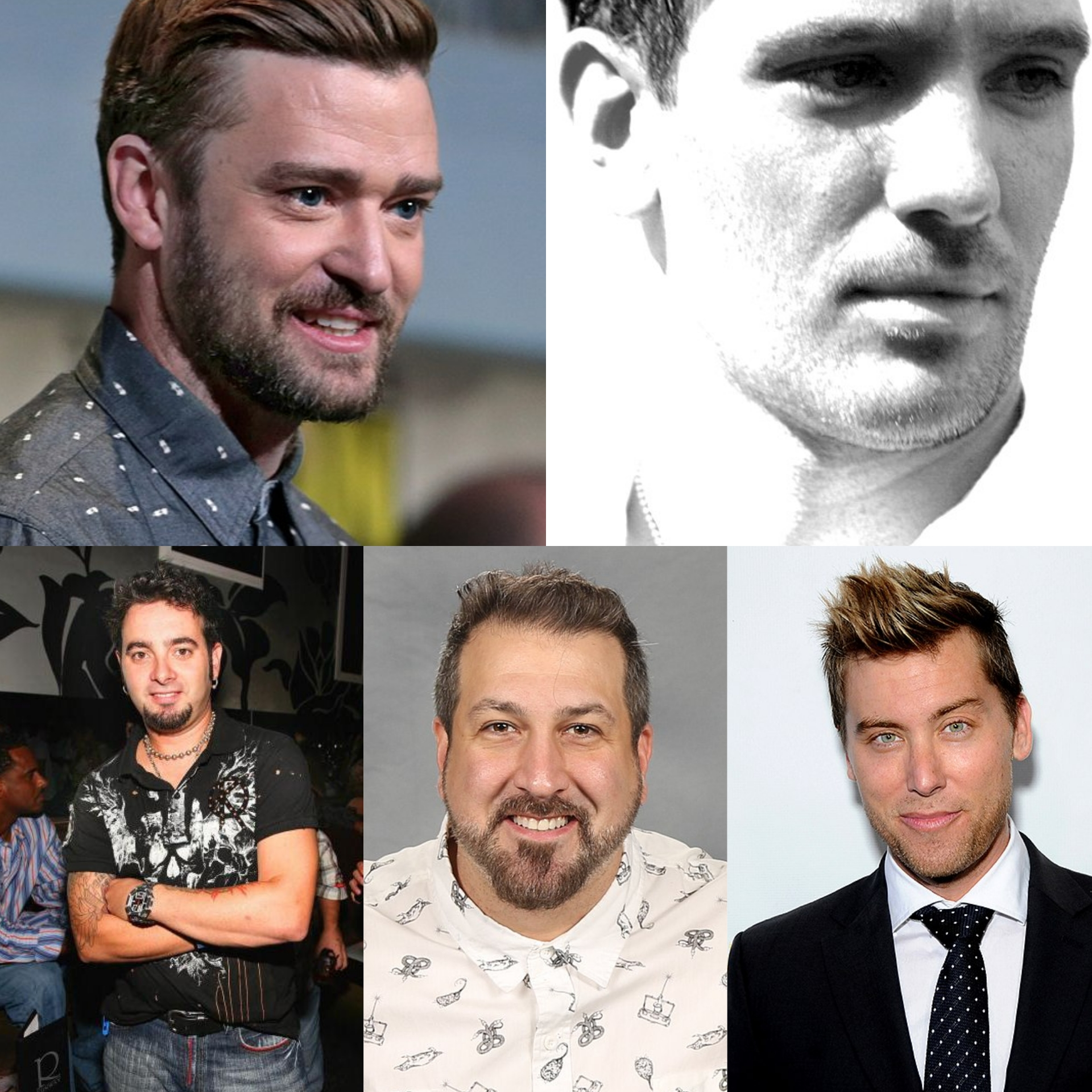
NSYNC's No Strings Attached was named the Billboard 200 Album of the Decade (2000s)

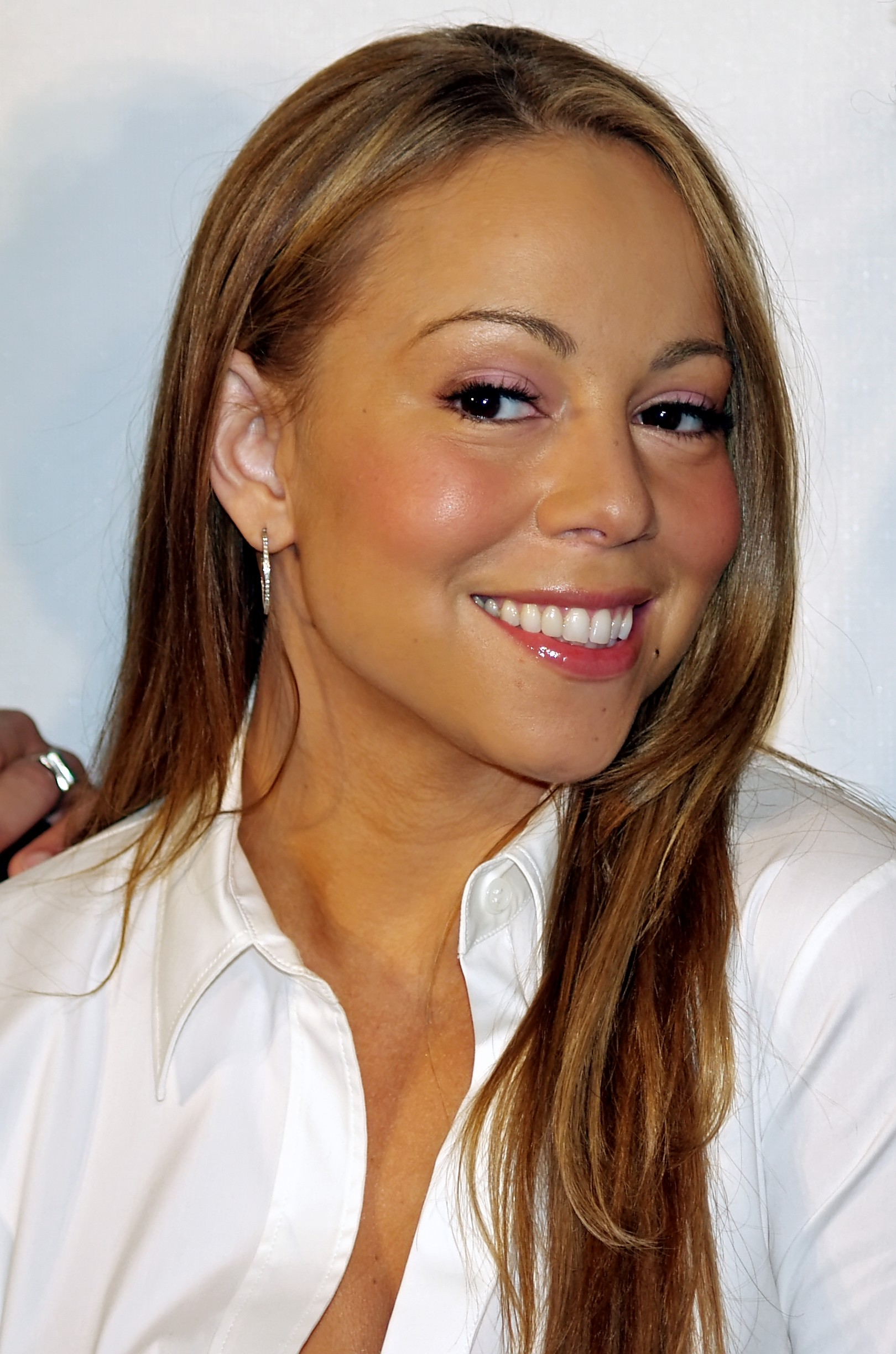
Mariah Carey's "We Belong Together" was named the Hot 100 Song of the Decade (2000s)

List of artists, albums, and songs of the 2000s decade
Category	Artist of the Decade	Album of the Decade	Song of the Decade
Overall	Eminem	—	—
Hot 100	Usher	—	"We Belong Together" by Mariah Carey
Billboard 200	Eminem	No Strings Attached by NSYNC	—
Radio Songs	Beyoncé	—	"We Belong Together" by Mariah Carey
Digital Songs	Rihanna	—	"Low" by Flo Rida featuring T-Pain
Digital Albums	Coldplay	Viva la Vida or Death and All His Friends by Coldplay	—
Pop Songs	Pink	—	"Apologize" by Timbaland featuring OneRepublic
Adult Contemporary	Faith Hill	—	"I Knew I Loved You" by Savage Garden
Adult Pop Songs	Nickelback	—	"Wherever You Will Go" by the Calling
Dance/Club Play	Madonna	—	"Hung Up" by Madonna
Dance/Electronic	Gorillaz	Demon Days by Gorillaz	—
R&B/Hip-Hop	Alicia Keys	2001 by Dr. Dre	"Be Without You" by Mary J. Blige
Rock	Linkin Park	—	"How You Remind Me" by Nickelback
Country	Toby Keith	Some Hearts by Carrie Underwood	"Somebody Like You" by Keith Urban
Jazz	Norah Jones	Come Away with Me by Norah Jones	—
Blues	Eric Clapton	Riding with the King by B.B. King and Eric Clapton	—
Classical	Josh Groban	Closer by Josh Groban	—
Latin	Marco Antonio Solís	Barrio Fino by Daddy Yankee	"A Puro Dolor" by Son by Four
Christian Songs	MercyMe	—	"Word of God Speak" by MercyMe
Christian Albums	P.O.D.	Satellite by P.O.D.	—
Gospel Albums	Yolanda Adams	Mountain High... Valley Low by Yolanda Adams	—
Independent Albums	Lil Jon & The East Side Boyz	Who Let the Dogs Out by Baha Men	—
Reggae	Sean Paul	Dutty Rock by Sean Paul	—
World	Baha Men	Who Let the Dogs Out by Baha Men	—
New Age	Enya	A Day Without Rain by Enya	—
Comedy	Dane Cook	Retaliation by Dane Cook	—
Kid	Kids Bop Kids	High School Musical by various artists	—

== 2010s ==
Drake accepted the trophy during the ceremony of the 2021 Billboard Music Awards held on May 23, 2021.

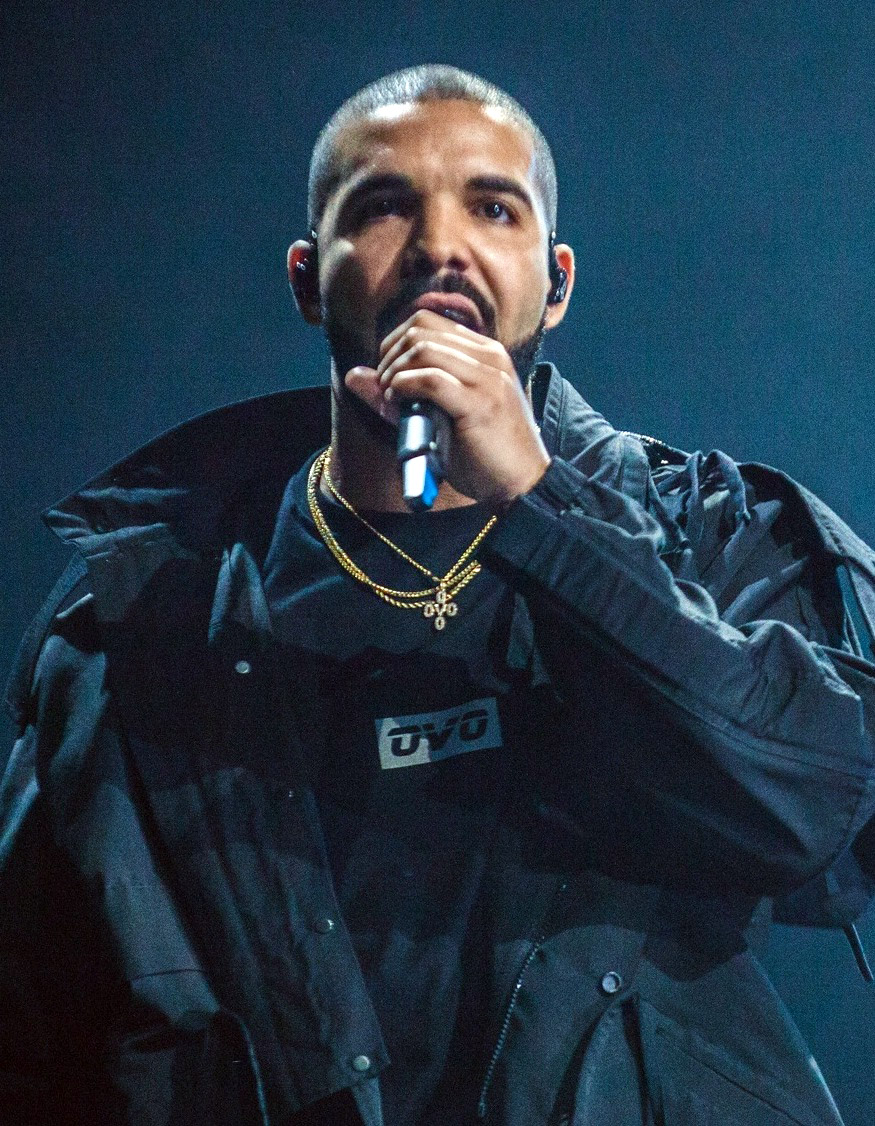
Drake was named the Artist of the Decade (2010s)

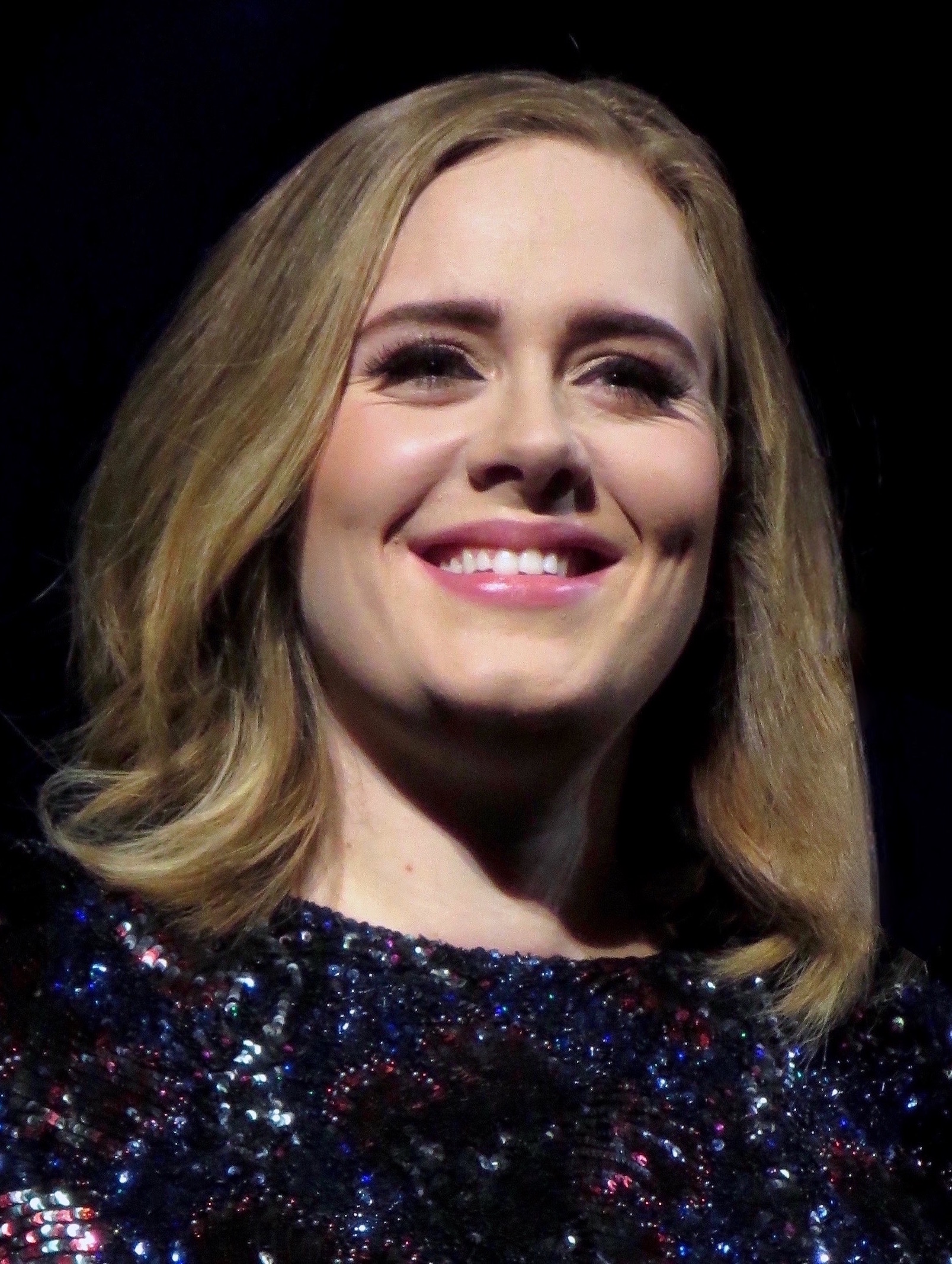
Adele's 21 was named the Billboard 200 Album of the Decade (2010s)

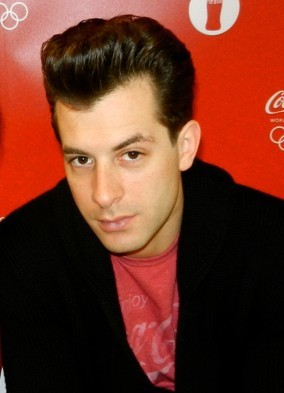
Mark Ronson's "Uptown Funk" was named the Hot 100 Song of the Decade (2010s)

List of artists, albums, and songs of the 2010s decade
Category	Artist of the Decade	Album of the Decade	Song of the Decade
Overall	Drake	—	—
Hot 100	—	—	"Uptown Funk" by Mark Ronson featuring Bruno Mars
Billboard 200	—	21 by Adele	—
Streaming	—	—	"Gangnam Style" by Psy
Radio	—	—	"Shape of You" by Ed Sheeran
Digital Songs	—	—	"Perfect" by Ed Sheeran
Social 50	Justin Bieber	—	—
Country	Luke Bryan	Traveller by Chris Stapleton	"Meant to Be" by Bebe Rexha and Florida Georgia Line
Rock	Imagine Dragons	Blurryface by Twenty One Pilots	"Believer" by Imagine Dragons
R&B/Hip-Hop	Drake	Take Care by Drake	"Thrift Shop" by Macklemore & Ryan Lewis featuring Wanz
Latin	Romeo Santos	Formula, Vol. 2 by Romeo Santos	"Despacito" by Luis Fonsi and Daddy Yankee featuring Justin Bieber
Christian	MercyMe	How Can It Be by Lauren Daigle	"Oceans (Where Feet May Fail)" by Hillsong United
Gospel	Tasha Cobbs Leonard	Best Days by Tamela Mann	"Every Praise" by Hezekiah Walker
Dance/Electronic	The Chainsmokers	The Fame by Lady Gaga	"Happier" by Marshmello and Bastille
Touring	U2	—	—
