= Country Living =

American lifestyle and home magazine

- Cover of magazine from September 2022
- Editor: Rachel Hardage Barrett
- Frequency: Monthly (1978–2022); Bimonthly (2023–present)
- Publisher: Hearst Magazines
- Total circulation: 1,641,000 (2012)
- Founded: 1978; 48 years ago
- Company: Hearst Magazines
- Country: United States
- Based in: Birmingham, Alabama
- Language: English
- Website: www.countryliving.com
- ISSN: 0732-2569

Country Living is an American lifestyle and home magazine published by the Hearst Corporation since 1978. The monthly magazine focuses on food, home renovation, home decor, DIY and lifestyle. The magazine hosts four Country Living Fairs a year in Rhinebeck, NY, Nashville, TN, Columbus, OH and Atlanta, GA.

In 2014, the magazine relocated its editorial offices from New York City's Hearst Tower (Manhattan) to Birmingham, Alabama. The current editor-in-chief is Rachel Hardage Barrett.

The magazine initially was conceptualized by John Mack Carter. From 1978 to 1998, the editor-in-chief was Rachel Newman (editor). The magazine was the first dedicated to the country look, and the focus was originally on Early American and period homes. In addition to country homes, regular features included home plans, inns, real estate listings, kitchens, cooking and folk remedies. During its early years, it was the fastest growing publication in the Hearst Corporation's history.

== UK edition ==
The UK edition of the magazine was launched in the summer of 1985. As the editor in the UK of Country Living, Deirdre McSharry was awarded editor of the year by the Professional Publishers Association in 1987. From 1995 the editor-in-chief was Susy Smith, who subsequently left the publication in 2019.
