= Red Rock Lakes National Wildlife Refuge =

Protected area in Montana, United States

- IUCN category IV (habitat/species management area)
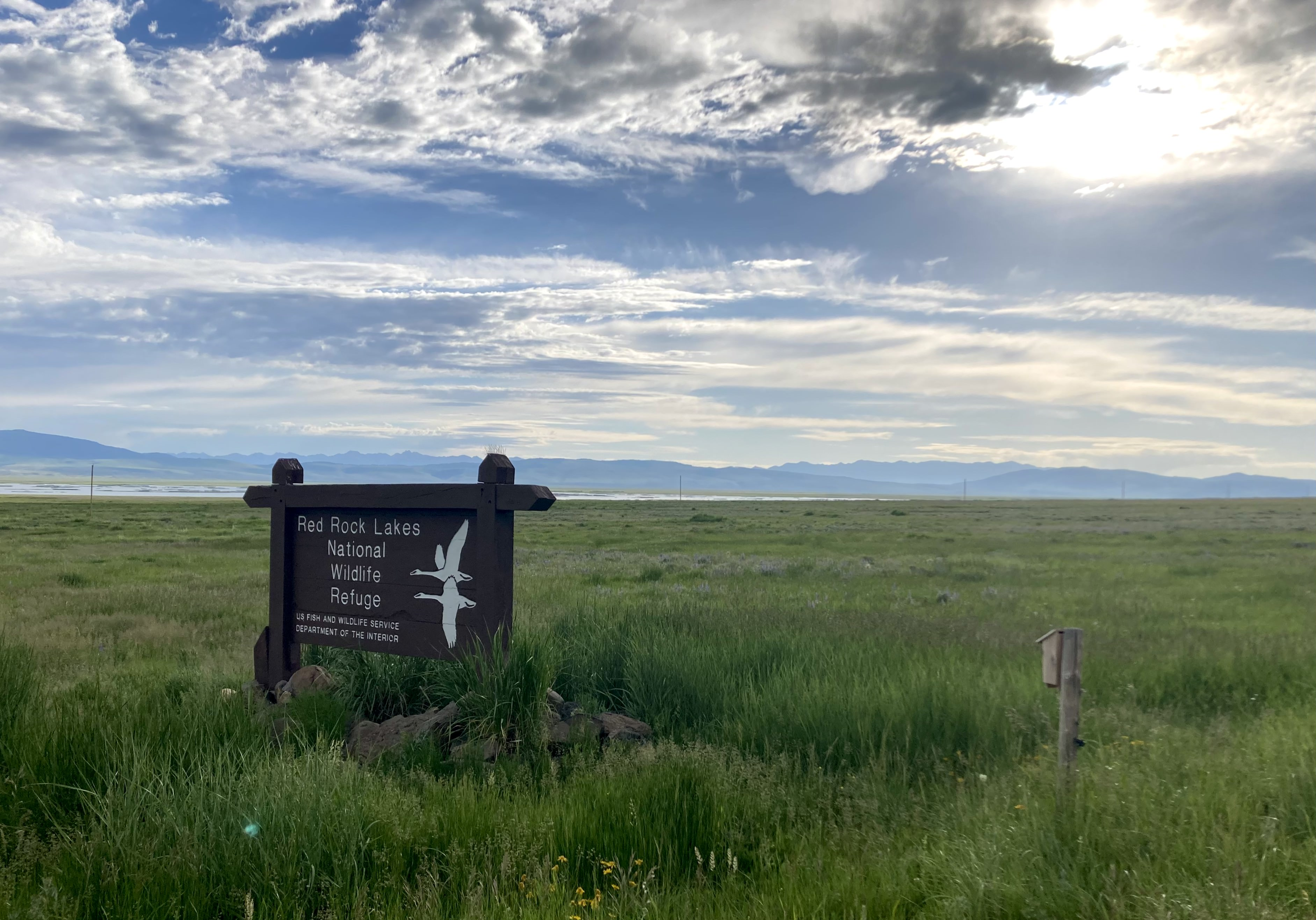

- Location within the United States
- Location: Beaverhead County, Montana, United States
- Nearest city: Dillon, MT
- Coordinates: 44°37′49″N 111°46′53″W
- Area: 65,810.25 acres (26,632.46 ha)
- Established: 1935
- Governing body: U.S. Fish and Wildlife Service
- Website: Red Rock Lakes National Wildlife Refuge

U.S. National Natural Landmark
- Designated: 1966

Red Rock Lakes National Wildlife Refuge, established by executive order in 1935, is a remote refuge located in the high elevation of the Centennial Valley, in the southwestern region of the U.S. state of Montana. Adjacent to Gallatin National Forest and near Yellowstone National Park, the refuge is an integral part of the Greater Yellowstone Ecosystem. Red Rock Lakes is best known for being the primary location for the efforts saving the trumpeter swan from extinction, which by 1932 had fewer than 200 known specimens in the United States and Canada. By the year 2002, an estimated 3,000 trumpeters were wintering on the refuge, many having migrated south from their summer range in Canada. The trumpeters are now so plentiful that efforts are being undertaken to help them reestablish historical migratory routes to areas further south in the Rocky Mountains and the Great Basin region. The elegant trumpeter swan is North America's largest waterfowl, with a wingspans of 8 feet (2.6 m) and they can weigh up to 30 pounds (13 kg).

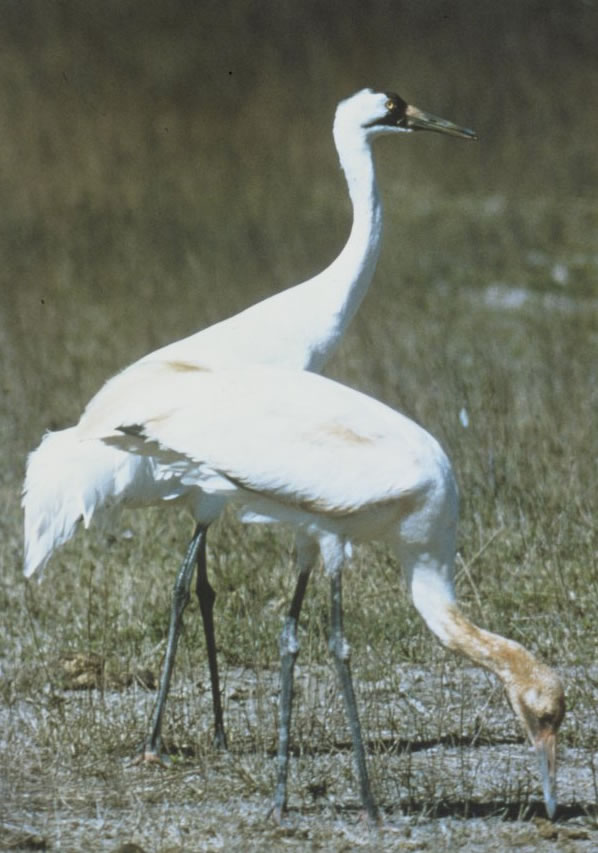
Whooping cranes

The elevation of the refuge ranges from 6,600 feet (2,000 m) to almost 10,000 feet (3,000 m) and consists of 65,810.25 acres (266.32 km^{2}) of high elevation prairie and forested uplands. The lakes and cold water marshlands provide a relatively uncommon wetland environment favored by certain waterfowl and predatory birds such as the bald eagle and peregrine falcon. There have been sightings of over 250 different bird species in the refuge and over 100 different species are known to nest here. There are reportedly 20 nesting pairs of bald eagles on the refuge, and there have been several sightings of the endangered whooping crane. Numerous mammals can also be found here such as the American black bear, the Rocky Mountain elk, moose, mule deer, pronghorn, beaver, mink and badger. It is also believed that the grizzly bear and wolf packs may frequent the refuge, and wolverine have been recorded.

The refuge has been designated a National Natural Landmark and the creation of the 32,350 acre (130.1 km^{2}) Red Rock Lakes Wilderness in 1976 ensures that no further human improvements will be undertaken on the vast bulk of the refuge land. There are no maintained trails in the refuge and access to some areas is prohibited during certain times of the year. The refuge is staffed year round but accessibility to the refuge in the winter is often difficult. Red Rock Lakes National Wildlife Refuge is located 28 miles (45 km) east of Monida, Montana off Interstate 15.

== Climate ==
Climate data for Red Rock (RAWS), Montana, 1991–2020 normals: 6690ft (2039m)
Month	Jan	Feb	Mar	Apr	May	Jun	Jul	Aug	Sep	Oct	Nov	Dec	Year
Mean daily maximum °F (°C)	24.8 (−4.0)	29.6 (−1.3)	39.8 (4.3)	47.1 (8.4)	57.9 (14.4)	67.1 (19.5)	77.4 (25.2)	76.5 (24.7)	66.2 (19.0)	51.2 (10.7)	35.8 (2.1)	25.4 (−3.7)	49.9 (9.9)
Daily mean °F (°C)	13.7 (−10.2)	16.7 (−8.5)	27.0 (−2.8)	35.1 (1.7)	44.8 (7.1)	52.7 (11.5)	60.4 (15.8)	59.1 (15.1)	50.1 (10.1)	37.8 (3.2)	24.5 (−4.2)	14.8 (−9.6)	36.4 (2.4)
Mean daily minimum °F (°C)	2.4 (−16.4)	3.8 (−15.7)	14.3 (−9.8)	23.2 (−4.9)	31.8 (−0.1)	38.4 (3.6)	43.5 (6.4)	41.7 (5.4)	34.1 (1.2)	24.3 (−4.3)	13.2 (−10.4)	4.1 (−15.5)	22.9 (−5.0)
Source: XMACIS2

== See also ==
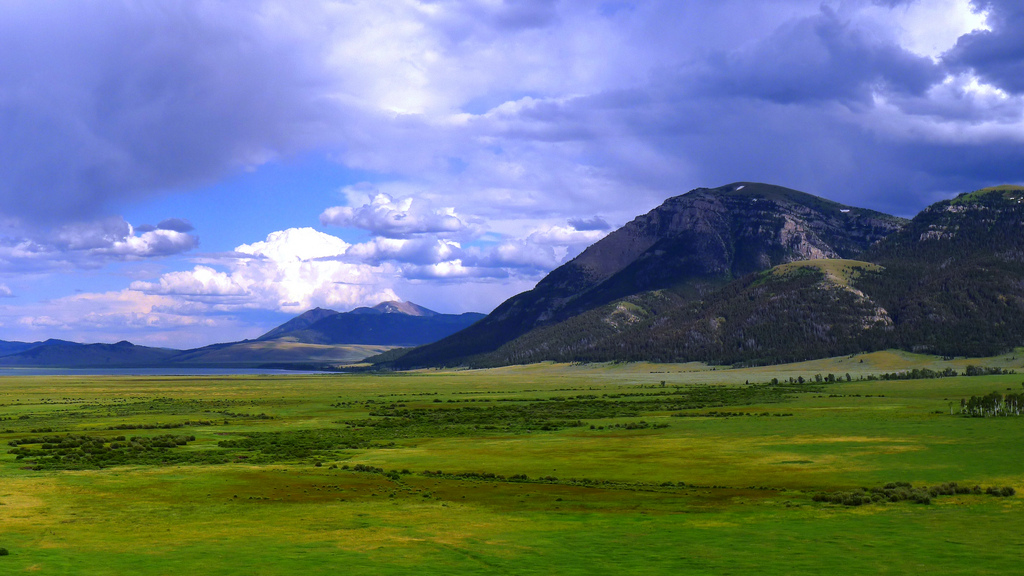
Upper Red Rock Lake and Centennial Mountains

List of largest National Wildlife Refuges
