= The Trumpet of the Swan =

1970 novel by E. B. White

- First edition, cover art by Edward Frascino
- Author: E. B. White
- Illustrator: Edward Frascino (1st Edition); Fred Marcellino (2000 edition)
- Language: English
- Genre: Children's novel
- Publisher: Harper & Row (US); Hamish Hamilton (UK)
- Publication date: 1970
- Publication place: United States
- Media type: Print (hardback and paperback)
- ISBN: 0-06-440048-4

The Trumpet of the Swan is a children's novel by E. B. White published in 1970. It tells the story of Louis, (Note: Pronounced "LOO-ee" by the author in the audiobook, a reference to trumpeter Louis Armstrong, a point that is made explicit in the book.) a trumpeter swan born without a voice who overcomes this difficulty by learning to play a trumpet in order to impress a beautiful swan named Serena.

== Plot summary ==
In Canada during the spring of 1968, the cob (the name for an adult male swan) and the pen (the name for an adult female swan), both trumpeter swans, build their summer nest on a small island in a pond. The swans are worried when Sam Beaver, an 11-year-old boy on a camping trip with his father, begins coming to the lake every day to watch them; the cob believes that human boys are dangerous. One day while the pen steps away from her eggs to stretch her legs, a fox slips up behind her. Sam scares the fox away with a stick, saving both the female and her eggs. After this incident, the swans begin to trust him. After the hatching of their cygnets, the cob proudly leads his brood to Sam to introduce them. The cygnets each chirp at Sam in greeting, except for Louis, the youngest, who is unable to chirp but pulls Sam's shoelace instead. The cob and the pen realize through this interaction that Louis has been born mute.

They grow increasingly concerned about Louis, worrying that he will not be able to find a mate if he cannot trumpet like all the other swans. Louis's father promises to find a way for him to communicate. At the end of summer, the swan family flies to the winter refuge, Red Rock Lakes in Montana. Louis decides he should learn to read and write in order to communicate, and flies away from the refuge to visit Sam Beaver. Sam takes his swan friend to school with him the next morning. Louis turns out to be a natural at reading and writing, and Sam buys him a slate and chalk so he can communicate. Unfortunately, because the other swans cannot read, Louis is still lonely.

When Louis returns to the Red Rock Lakes, he falls in love with a young swan, Serena, but cannot attract her attention. Louis's father is aware that trumpeter swans are named after the human musical instrument and becomes determined to acquire a trumpet as a substitute "voice" for Louis. The cob crashes through the window of a music store in Billings, Montana, and steals a brass trumpet on a cord. By the time Louis learns to effectively play the trumpet, Serena has migrated north. Instead of accompanying his family north where he might have to face Serena again, Louis visits Sam on his ranch and explains that he feels guilty about the stolen trumpet. Sam suggests that Louis should get a job so he can pay the store for the trumpet and the damaged window. He helps Louis find a position as camp bugler at Camp Kookooskoos, the boys' camp Sam attends. Louis convinces Sam to split one of his webbed feet with a razor blade, making "fingers" so that he can play more notes.

Over the course of the summer, Louis plays taps, reveille, and mess call and composes a love song for Serena. He also receives a Lifesaving Medal for rescuing a drowning camper. At the end of the summer, he has earned $100, which he carries in a waterproof pouch around his neck along with his slate, chalk, medal, and trumpet. Sam suggests that Louis can get a job with the Swan Boats in Boston. Louis flies across country and becomes an instant success, with a salary of $100 per week and a private suite in the Ritz Hotel.

A Philadelphia nightclub offers Louis a higher salary, $500 per week. He leaves Boston and takes up temporary residence at the Philadelphia Zoo. The zookeeper promises that because Louis is only a guest, he will not be pinioned (have a wing tip cut off to prevent escape) like all the other swans at the zoo. One stormy night, Serena, blown off course, falls into the Zoo's Bird Lake. Louis serenades her by playing "Beautiful Dreamer" on his trumpet, and she falls in love with him, impressed by his song and the numerous possessions hanging around his neck. When the zookeepers spot Serena, they try to clip her wings, and Louis attacks them. He convinces the Head Man to postpone the operation for a short while and sends a telegram to Sam, asking for help. Sam goes to Philadelphia and strikes a deal with the Head Man: in every clutch of cygnets, there is always one that needs special care, just as Louis did in his own family. If the Head Man will let Louis and Serena go free, they will donate one of their cygnets to the zoo when it's in need of a bird.

Louis and Serena fly back to the Red Rock Lakes. Now intending to live the rest of his life among other swans, he no longer needs his slate. Louis writes an apology on the slate and gives it and the money bag to his father, who flies back to the music store in Billings. Afraid that the swan will destroy another window, the storekeeper shoots at the cob and nicks him in the shoulder. The cob lands, hands the storekeeper the slate and money, and faints at the sight of his own blood. The storekeeper is amazed to see the note and the money, which amounts to several times the cost of both the stolen trumpet and the window. Because the trumpeter swan is a protected species, the cob is taken to a wildlife veterinarian, where his injury is treated. When he is recovered, he flies back to the Red Rock Lakes to rejoin his family, including Louis and Serena.

Many years later, when Sam is about 20 years old, he is again camping in Canada when he hears the sound of a trumpet playing across the lake and knows it must be Louis. He writes in his journal:

"Tonight I heard Louis's horn. My father heard it, too. The wind was right, and I could hear the notes of taps, just as darkness fell. There is nothing in all the world I like better than the trumpet of the swan."

== Reception ==
=== Contemporary reviews ===
The book received a strong positive review by John Updike in The New York Times, in which he said, "While not quite so sprightly as Stuart Little, and less rich in personalities and incident than Charlotte's Web – that paean to barnyard life by a city humorist turned farmer – The Trumpet of the Swan has superior qualities of its own; it is the most spacious and serene of the three, the one most imbued with the author's sense of the precious instinctual heritage represented by wild nature."

=== Awards ===
In the category Children's Books, The Trumpet of the Swan was a finalist the National Book Awards 1971, losing out to Lloyd Alexander's The Marvelous Misadventures of Sebastian.

== Adaptations ==
Because of its success, The Trumpet of the Swan had a few adaptations.

=== Audiobook ===
An unabridged reading of the book by author White was once audio recorded and has since been published as an audiobook.

=== Philadelphia Orchestra piece ===
In 1972, a piece by composer Benjamin Lees based on The Trumpet of the Swan was performed by the Philadelphia Orchestra (an orchestra with which Louis is mentioned as giving a guest performance).

=== Film ===
An animated film based on the book was made in 2001 by Rich Animation Studios, released by Nest Family Entertainment and distributed by TriStar Pictures.

=== Novel symphony ===
A "novel symphony for actors and orchestra" was adapted from the book in 2011 by Marsha Norman with music composed and conducted by Jason Robert Brown. The production starred John Lithgow, Kathy Bates, Jesse Tyler Ferguson, Mandy Moore, James Naughton, and Martin Short. The production has been published on CD and by direct download.

Awards
Preceded by Sasha: My Friend	Winner of the William Allen White Children's Book Award; 1973	Succeeded by Mrs. Frisby and the Rats of NIMH and The Headless Cupid
