= Edward Frascino =

American illustrator and author

Edward Frascino was an American illustrator and author. He is perhaps best known for his illustrations in E.B. White's The Trumpet of the Swan.

== Biography ==
Edward Frascino was born in New York City on November 15, 1930. He was the son of Mario and Rose Frascino. He was of Albanian and Italian descent.

He attended Parsons School of Design. He served in the U.S. Army in Korea from 1951 to 1953.

His cartoons have appeared in The New Yorker in a regular series as well as in Punch, Saturday Review, and The New York Times.

Frascino died August 13, 2026 in Los Angeles.

== Selected works ==
=== As author and illustrator ===
- Eddie Spaghetti. HarperCollins. 1978. ISBN 9780060219086.
- Eddie Spaghetti on the Homefront. HarperCollins. 1983. ISBN 9780060218942.
- My Cousin the King. Prentice Hall. 1985. ISBN 9780136084235.
- Nanny Noony and the Magic Spell. Pippin Press. 1988. ISBN 9780945912002.
- Nanny Noony and the Dust Queen. Pippin Press. 1990. ISBN 9780945912095.

=== As author ===
- Mudibo Piwang, Catherine; Frascino, Edward (2000). Visit from the Leopard: Memories of a Ugandan Childhood. Illustrated by James Roberts. Pippin Press. ISBN 9780945912279.

=== As illustrator ===
- Stolz, Mary (1968). Say Something. Illustrated by Edward Frascino. HarperCollins. ISBN 9780060211592.
- Stolz, Mary (1969). The Dragons of the Queen. Illustrated by Edward Frascino. HarperCollins. ISBN 9780060259730.
- Stolz, Mary (1969). The Story Of A Singular Hen And Her Peculiar Children. Illustrated by Edward Frascino. Harper. ISBN 9780060260385.
- Sharmat, Marjorie W. (1970). Gladys Told Me to Meet Her Here. Illustrated by Edward Frascino. HarperCollins. ISBN 9780060255503.
- White, E.B. (1970). The Trumpet of the Swan. Illustrated by Edward Frascino. Harper & Row. ISBN 9780060263973.
- Andersen, Hans Christian (1971). The Little Mermaid. Translated by Eva Le Gallienne; illustrated by Edward Frascino. Harper. ISBN 9780060237837.
- Yessayan Cretan, Gladys (1972). A Hole, a Box, and a Stick. Illustrated by Edward Frascino. Lothrop, Lee & Shepard Co. ISBN 9780688416287.
- Hart, Carole (1973). Delilah. Illustrated by Edward Frascino. HarperCollins. ISBN 9780060222369.
- Barry, Robert E. (1975). Snowman's Secret. Illustrated by Edward Frascino. MacMillan. ISBN 9780027083903.
- Gordon, Shirley (1976). Crystal Is the New Girl. Illustrated by Edward Frascino. HarperCollins. ISBN 9780060221126.
- Gordon, Shirley (1978). Crystal Is My Friend. Illustrated by Edward Frascino. HarperCollins. ISBN 9780060221126.
- Robison, Nancy L. (1978). UFO Kidnap!. Illustrated by Edward Frascino. HarperCollins. ISBN 9780688518530.
- Gray, Nigel (1979). It'll All Come Out in the Wash. Illustrated by Edward Frascino. HarperCollins. ISBN 9780060220679.
- Robison, Nancy (1979). Space Hijack!. Illustrated by Edward Frascino. Lothrop, Lee and Shepard Books. ISBN 9780688418977.
- Gordon, Shirley (1980). Me and the Bad Guys. Illustrated by Edward Frascino. HarperCollins. ISBN 9780060221164.
- Robison, Nancy (1980). Izoo. Illustrated by Edward Frascino. Lothrop, Lee and Shepard Books. ISBN 9780688419349.
- Gordon, Shirley (1981). Happy Birthday, Crystal. Illustrated by Edward Frascino. HarperCollins. ISBN 9780060220068.
- Keller, Charles (1982). Oh, Brother!: Family Jokes. Illustrated by Edward Frascino. Prentice Hall. ISBN 9780136333050.
- Warren, William E. (1984). The Graveyard and Other Not-So-Scary Stories. Illustrated by Edward Frascino. Prentice Hall. ISBN 9780133636239.
- Warren, William E. (1984). The Thing in the Swamp and More Not-So-Scary Stories. Illustrator by Edward Frascino. Prentice Hall. ISBN 9780139171963.
- Warren, William E. (1985). Footsteps in the Fog: Still More Not-So-Scary Stories. Illustrated by Edward Frascino. Prentice Hall. ISBN 9780133248074.
- Kipling, Rudyard (1987). The Elephant's Child. Illustrated by Edward Frascino. Prentice Hall. ISBN 9780132736404.
- Keller, Charles (1986). Count Draculations! Monster Riddles. Illustrated by Edward Frascino. Prentice Hall. ISBN 9780131836419.
- Gordon, Shirley (1989). Crystal's Christmas Carol. Illustrated by Edward Frascino. HarperCollins. ISBN 9780060221270.
- Keller, Charles (1989). King Henry the Ape: Animal Jokes. Illustrated by Edward Frascino. Pippin Press. ISBN 9780945912088.
- Slaughter, Hope (1993). Windmill Hill. Illustrated by Edward Frascino. Pippin Press. ISBN 978-0945912217.
- Marquis, Don (1996). Archyology. Illustrated by Edward Frascino. UPNE. ISBN 9780874517453.
- Marquis, Don (1998). Archyology II (the Final Dig): The Long Lost Tales of Archy and Mehitabel. Illustrated by Edward Frascino. University Press of New England. ISBN 9780874518535.

=== As contributor ===
- The New Yorker Book of Lawyer Cartoons. Knopf. 1993. ISBN 9780679430681.
- Mankoff, Robert, ed. (2012). The New Yorker Book of Teacher Cartoons. John Wiley & Sons. ISBN 9781118362358.
- Mankoff, Robert, ed. (2012). The New Yorker Book of Baseball Cartoons. John Wiley & Sons. ISBN 9781118342046.

=== Other ===
- Avocado Is Not Your Color: And Other Scenes of Married Bliss. Penguin. 1983. ISBN 9780140063646.
