= Swan Boats (Boston, Massachusetts) =

Pontoon pleasure boats

Coordinates: 42.354016°N 71.069643°W

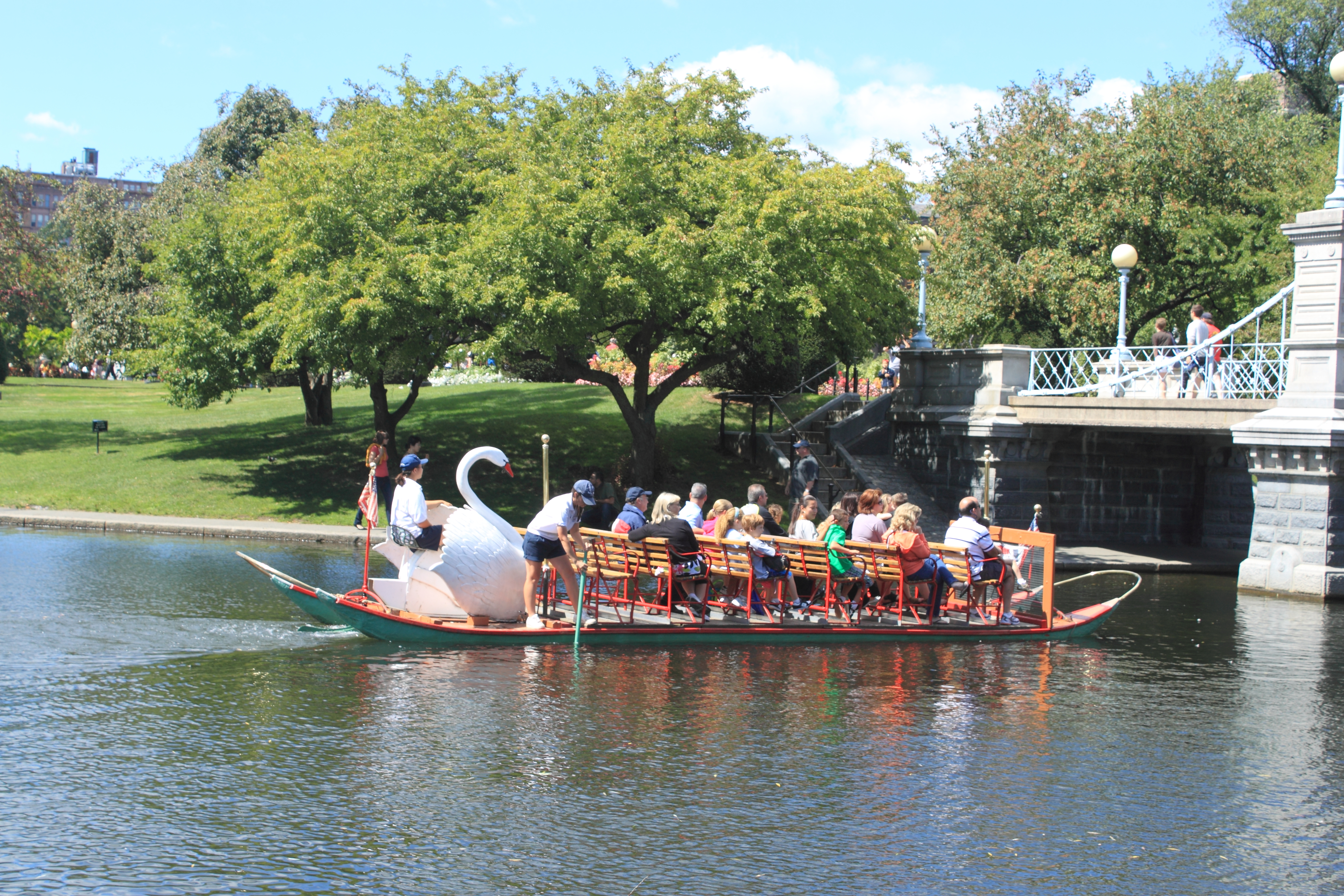
Boston Swan Boat

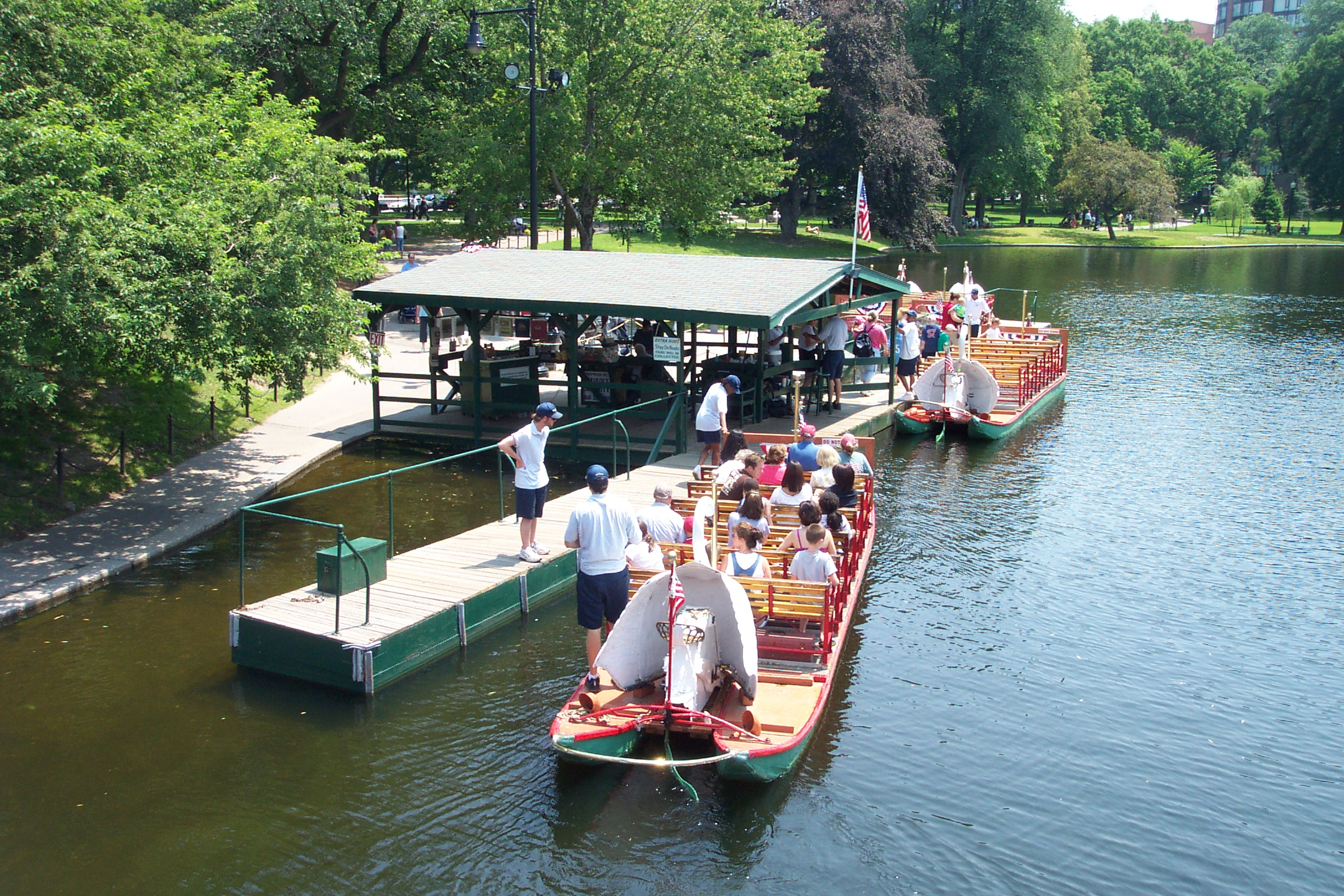
The Swan Boat dock; note pedals on nearest boat

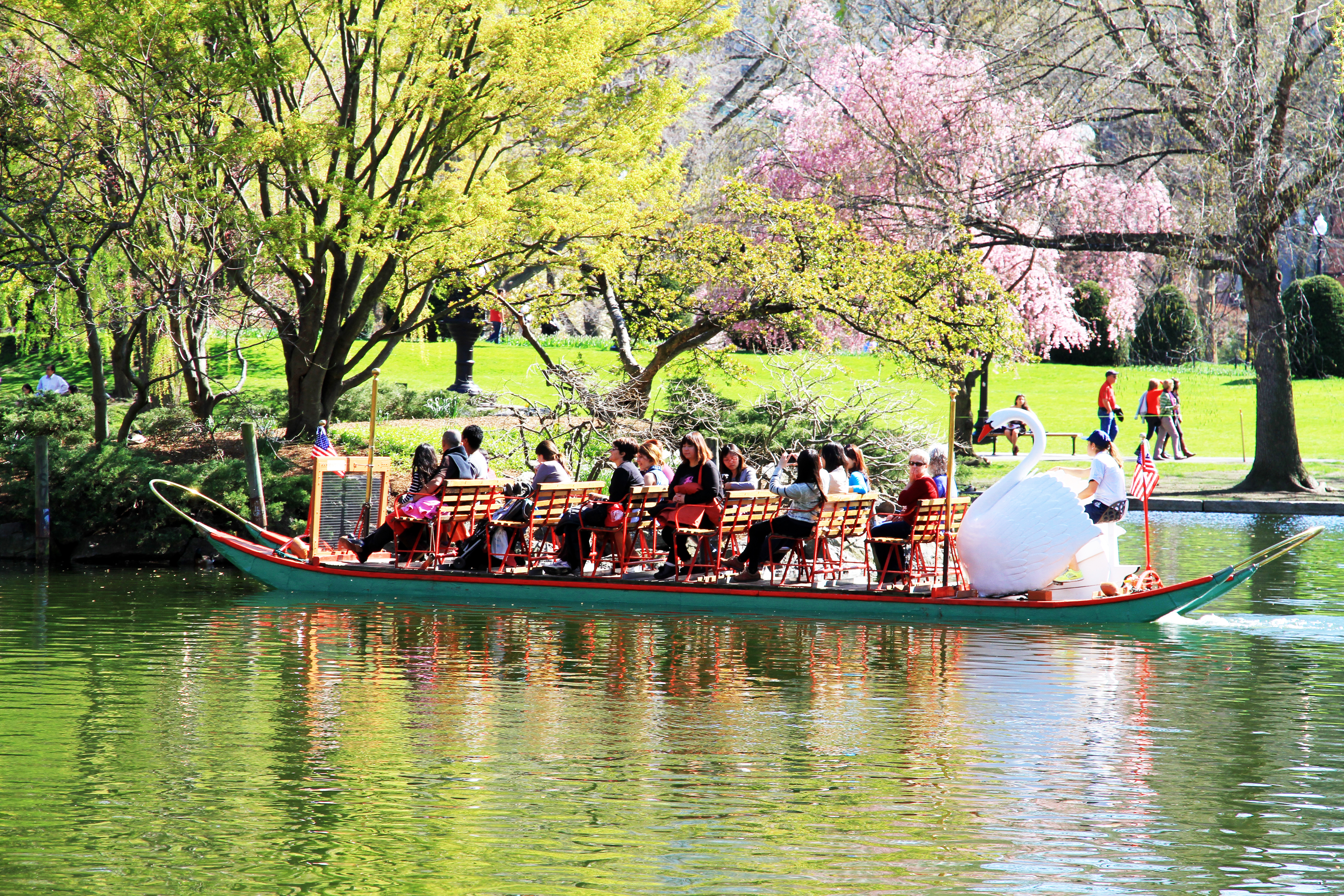
Swan Boats, 2013

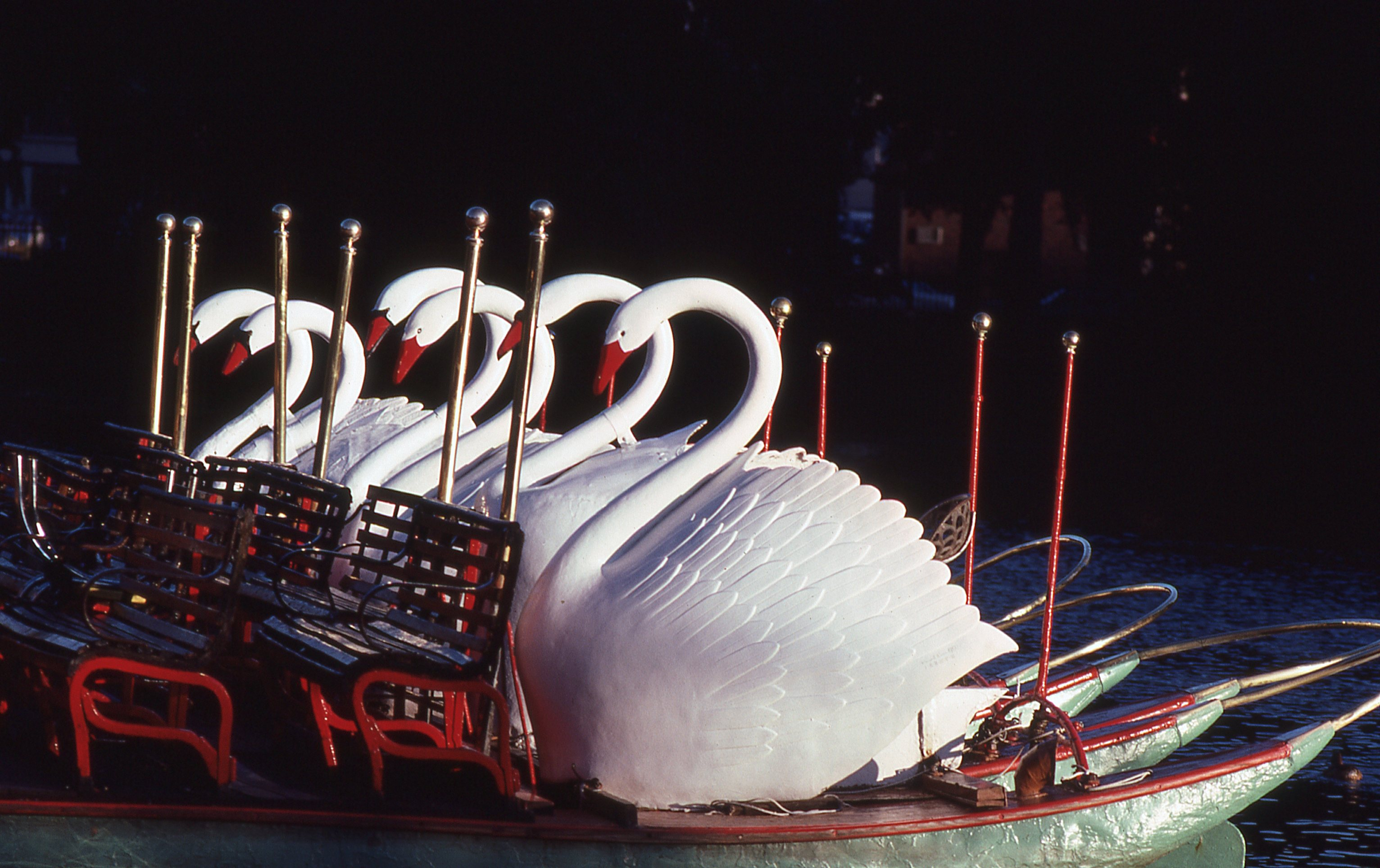
Closeup of Swan Boats in 1980

The Swan Boats are a fleet of pontoon pleasure boats which operate in a pond in the Public Garden in Boston, Massachusetts. The Swan Boats have been in operation since 1877, and have since become a cultural icon for the city. They operate from the second weekend of April to the weekend of Labor Day.

== History ==
Robert Paget first created the Swan Boats in the Public Garden in 1877, after seeing the opera Lohengrin with his wife Julia Paget. Inspired by the knight's gallant rescue of the damsel by riding a swan across the lake, Paget decided to capitalize on the recent popularity of the bicycle and combine the two, designing a two-pontooned boat with two wooden benches and a brass seat on top of a paddlebox concealed by a swan. The driver would sit inside the swan and pedal passengers around the pond.

Swan boats have since operated every year until 2020, when they stayed closed due to the COVID-19 pandemic in Massachusetts. They have returned to run each year since then, beginning in May, 2021.

== Current design ==
To this day, the design for the Swan Boat has changed very little. The boats have been periodically replaced throughout the years, and the current fleet operates with six boats. Each boat has kept the original design, with two pontoons, a brass seat atop a paddlebox concealed by a fiberglass swan, and wooden benches for passengers. However, more rows of benches have been added over the years. Five of the boats have six rows, each row holding about three to four adults, and the oldest boat has five rows, which seat two to three adults each. The boats range in age from roughly 30 to over 100 years old. The oldest boat in operation was built in 1910, and the newest was built in 1992.

== Current operation ==
The Swan Boats operate in the same pond in the Public Garden in which they have operated for over 140 years. A Swan Boat ride is a peaceful experience, usually lasting about 12–15 minutes. Each boat is powered solely by a driver, often a high school or college student, who pedals the boat like a bicycle. The boats are steered by pulling one of two ropes connected to a series of pulleys and a rudder. The Swan Boats remain a Boston tradition and symbol of the city.

The Swan Boats are famed for their appearance in the stories of Make Way For Ducklings and The Trumpet of the Swan, and are often noted in tourist guides and other books about the city. In 1954 service was interrupted during the summer for the first time, when city officials drained the lake after 30 ducks died due to an infection.

== In popular culture ==
The post-apocalyptic video game Fallout 4 included Swan Boats in its Boston Common location, where players can collect swan boat fragments and find other notable landmarks such as the Parkman Bandstand and the first marker of the Freedom Trail.
