= Red Rock Lakes Wilderness =

Wilderness area in Montana, United States

- IUCN category Ib (wilderness area)
- Location within the United States
- Location: Beaverhead County, Montana, USA
- Nearest city: Dillon, MT
- Coordinates: 44°37′N 111°44′W
- Area: 32,350 acres (130.9 km^{2})
- Established: 1976
- Governing body: U.S. Fish and Wildlife Service

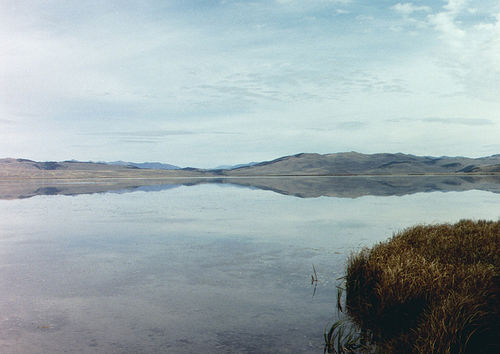
Upper Red Rock Lake.

The Red Rock Lakes Wilderness is within the Red Rock Lakes National Wildlife Refuge in southwest Montana, United States. The wilderness occupies more than three fourths of the refuge and was set aside to enhance species preservation, especially for such waterfowl as the trumpeter swan. By the mid-1930s, there were an estimated 69 trumpeter swans remaining in the lower 48 states and more than half of them were found in the region that is now the wilderness. The creation of the Wildlife Refuge marks one of the earliest attempts to ensure protection for a fast disappearing species and the wilderness designation enhances this habitat's protection status.

U.S. Wilderness Areas do not allow motorized or mechanized vehicles, including bicycles. No roads or buildings are constructed and there is also no logging or mining, in compliance with the 1964 Wilderness Act. Wilderness areas within National Forests and Bureau of Land Management areas also typically allow hunting in season.

Consisting of numerous lakes, marshes and other wetlands, a visitor is more likely to see sandhill cranes, great blue herons and ducks than the elusive trumpeter swan, even though their numbers have increased substantially. Moose, fox, porcupine and skunk are found year-round while elk, mule deer and pronghorn also frequent the wilderness. Though less common, black bears are sometimes seen here.

On the western boundary of what is collectively known as the Greater Yellowstone Ecosystem, camping is not permitted but there are two nearby campgrounds available in the refuge. Hiking is permitted except in some areas during specific times of the year to protect wildlife.
