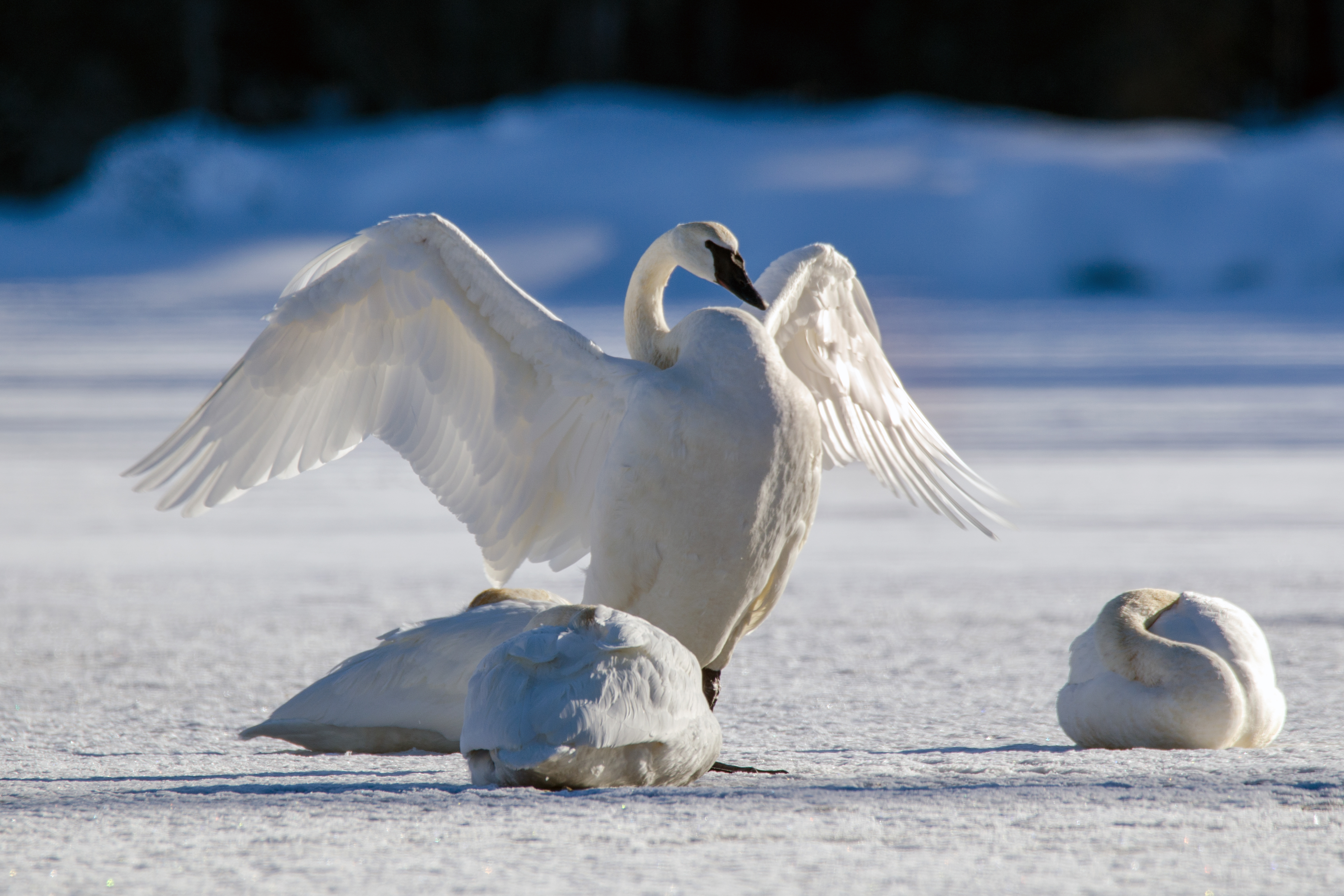

Conservation status
- Least Concern (IUCN 3.1)

- Apparently Secure (NatureServe)

Scientific classification
- Kingdom: Animalia
- Phylum: Chordata
- Class: Aves
- Order: Anseriformes
- Family: Anatidae
- Genus: Cygnus
- Species: C. buccinator

Binomial name
- Cygnus buccinator Richardson, 1831
- Range Breeding Year-round Non-breeding Migration

Audio
- Two calling trumpeter swans recorded at Rapids Lake Unit, Minnesota Valley NWR, Carver County, Minnesota

= Trumpeter swan =

Large species of waterfowl

The trumpeter swan (Cygnus buccinator), or simply the trumpeter, is a species of swan found in North America. The heaviest living bird native to North America, it is also the largest extant species of waterfowl, with a wingspan of 185 to 304.8 cm (6 ft 2 in to 10 ft 2 in). It is the American counterpart and a close relative of the whooper swan (Cygnus cygnus) of Eurasia and has even been considered the same species by some authorities. By 1933, fewer than 70 wild individuals were known to exist; extinction seemed imminent until aerial surveys discovered a Pacific population of several thousand trumpeter swans around Alaska's Copper River. Careful reintroductions by wildlife agencies and the Trumpeter Swan Society gradually restored the North American wild population to over 46,000 birds by 2010.

== Taxonomy ==
The trumpeter swan was formally described in 1831 by the Scottish naturalist John Richardson in the fourth volume of American Ornithology; or, The Natural History of Birds Inhabiting the United States by Alexander Wilson and Charles Bonaparte. Richardson coined the current binomial name Cygnus buccinator. A description by Richardson was also published in Fauna Boreali-Americana, or, The Zoology of the Northern Parts of British America by William Swainson and Richardson. Although the volume has 1831 printed on the title page, it was in fact not published until 1832. The etymology of the species name, buccinator, comes from the word bucina, a specific type of military trumpet. The trumpeter swan is monotypic, meaning that no subspecies are recognised.

== Description ==
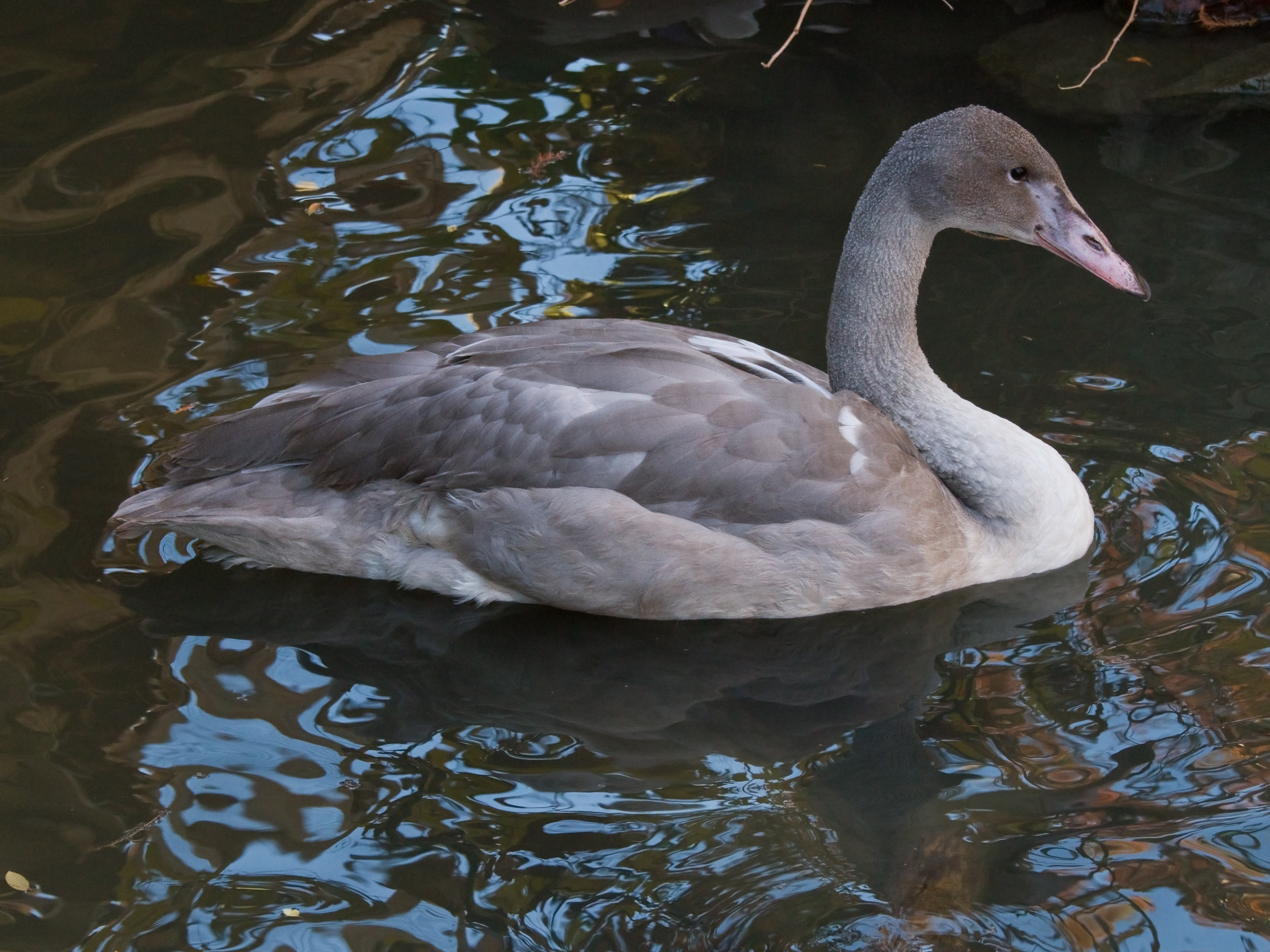
Juvenile at the Cincinnati Zoo

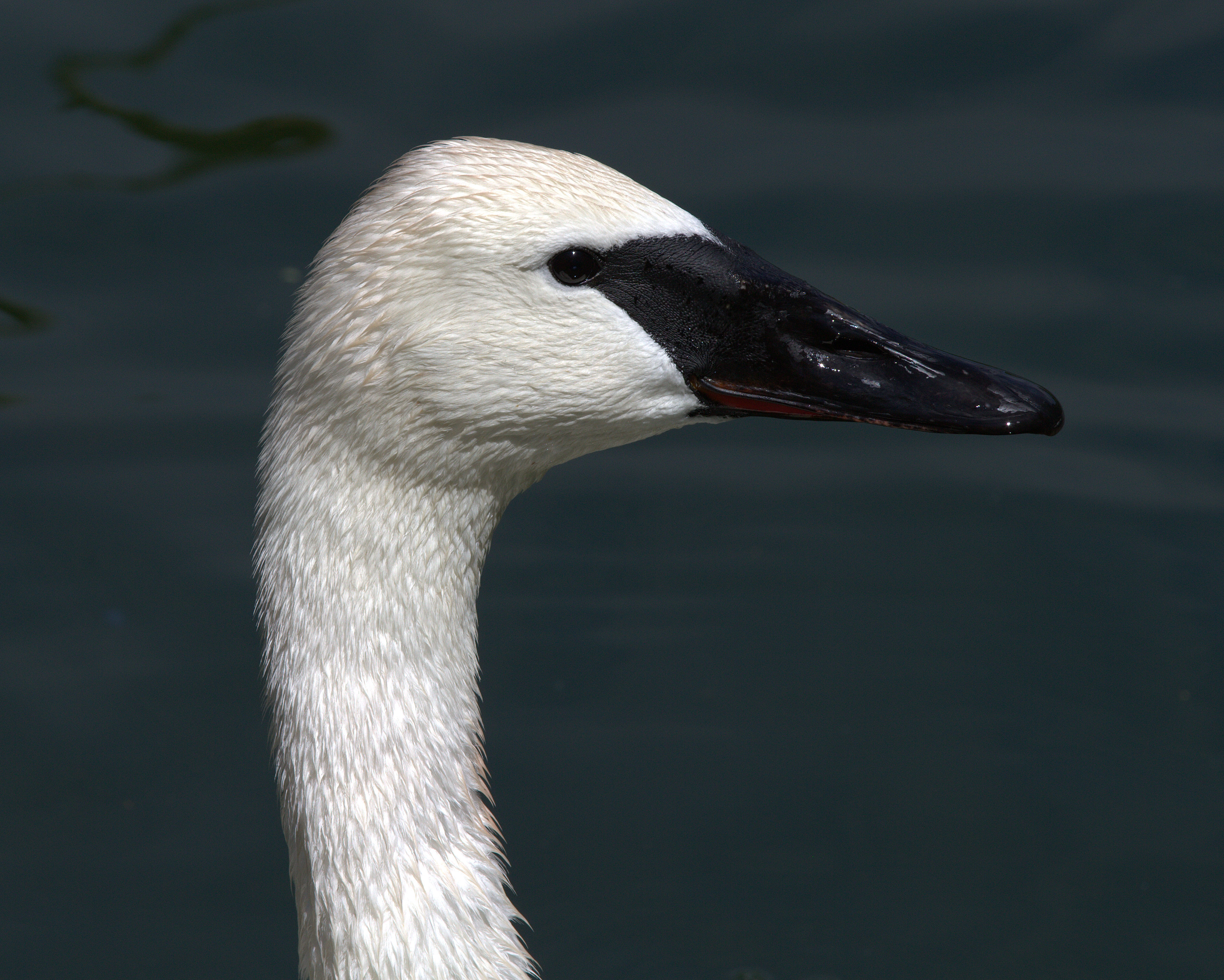
Its black bill is useful in distinguishing the trumpeter swan from the introduced mute swan.

Plate 406 of the Birds of America by John James Audubon, depicting the trumpeter swan

The trumpeter swan is the largest extant species of waterfowl, and both the heaviest and longest native bird of North America. Adults usually measure 138–165 cm (4 ft 6 in – 5 ft 5 in) long, though large males can exceed 180 cm (5 ft 11 in) in total length. The weight of adult birds is typically 7–13.6 kg (15–30 lb). Possibly due to seasonal variation based on food access and variability due to age, average weights in males have been reported to range from 10.9 to 12.7 kg (24 to 28 lb) and from 9.4 to 10.3 kg (21 to 23 lb) in females.

It is one of the heaviest living animals capable of flight, and, in terms of average mass, the heaviest flying bird in the world. Alongside the mute swan (Cygnus olor), wild turkey (Meleagris gallopavo), great bustard (Otis tarda), Kori bustard (Ardeotis kori), Dalmatian pelican (Pelecanus crispus), and Andean condor (Vultur gryphus), it is one of a handful to weigh in excess of 10 kg (22 lb) between the sexes, and one survey of wintering trumpeters found it averaged second only to the condor in mean mass. The trumpeter swan's wingspan ranges from 185 to 304.8 cm (6 ft 0.8 in to 10 ft 0 in), with the wing chord measuring 60–68 cm (24–27 in). The largest known male trumpeter attained a length of 183 cm (6 ft 0 in), a wingspan of 3.1 m (10 ft 2 in) and a weight of 17.2 kg (38 lb). It is the second heaviest wild waterfowl ever found, as one mute swan was found to weigh a massive 22.5 kg (50 lb), but it was unclear whether the latter swan was still capable of flight because of its bulk.

Adult plumage is entirely white. Like mute swan cygnets, trumpeter swan cygnets have light grey plumage and pinkish legs, gaining their white plumage after about a year. As with the whooper swan, this species has an upright posture and generally swims with a straight neck. The trumpeter swan has a large, wedge-shaped black bill that can be minimally lined with salmon-pink coloration around the mouth. The bill measures 10.5–12 cm (4.1–4.7 in), up to twice the length of a Canada goose (Branta canadensis) bill; the trumpeter swan bill is the largest of any waterfowl species in the world. The legs are gray-pink in color, though in some birds can appear yellowish gray to even black. The tarsus measures 10.5–12 cm (4.1–4.7 in).

The mute swan, introduced to North America, is scarcely smaller. However, it can easily be distinguished by its orange bill and different physical structure (particularly the neck, which is typically held curved as opposed to straight in the trumpeter). The mute swan is often found year-round in developed areas near human habitation in North America, whereas trumpeters are usually only found in pristine wetlands with minimal human disturbance, especially while breeding.

The tundra swan (C. columbianus) more closely resembles the trumpeter but is significantly smaller. The neck of a male trumpeter may be twice as long as the neck of a tundra swan. The tundra swan can be further distinguished by its yellow lores. However, some trumpeter swans have yellow lores; many of these individuals appear to be leucistic and have paler legs than typical trumpeters. Distinguishing tundra and trumpeter swans from a distance (when size is harder to gauge) can be challenging without direct comparison, but it is possible thanks to the trumpeter's obviously longer neck (the great length of which is apparent even when the swan is not standing or swimming upright) and larger, wedge-shaped bill as compared to the tundra swan.

Trumpeter swans have similar calls to whooper swans and Bewick's swans. They are loud and somewhat musical creatures, with their cry sounding similar to a trumpet, which gave the bird its name.

== Range and habitat ==
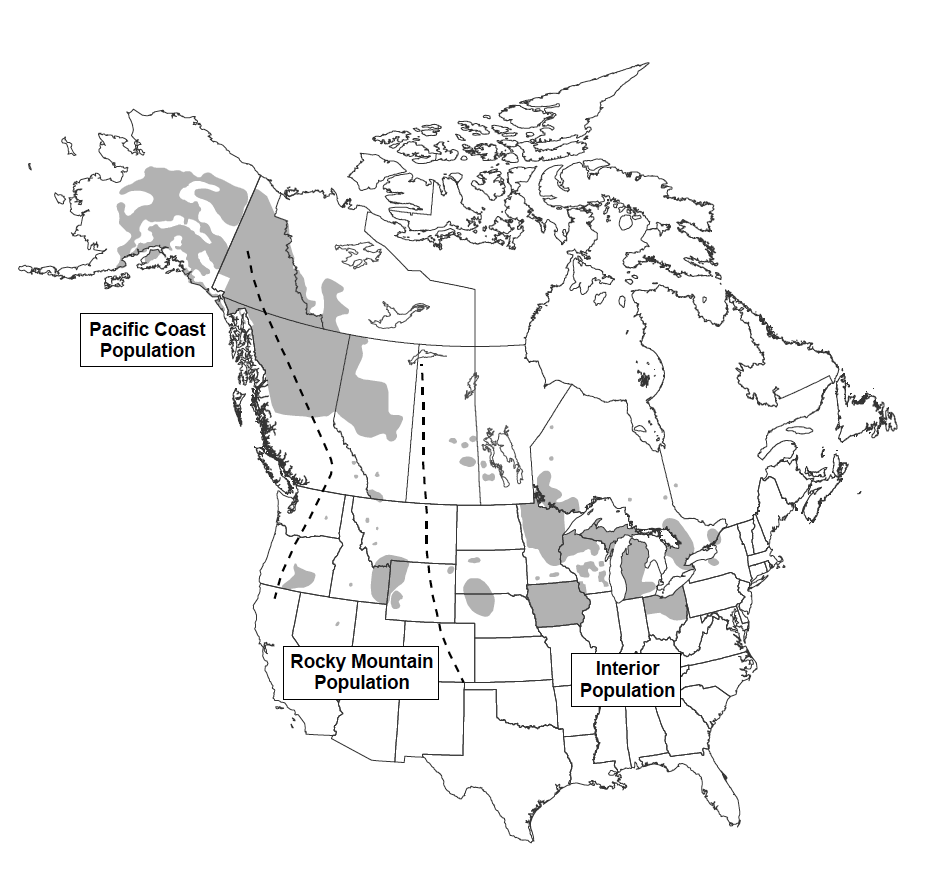
Approximate summer range of the three regional populations of trumpeter swans in North America

Cooperative continental surveys of trumpeter swans have been performed regularly, beginning in 1968, repeated in 1975, and then conducted at 5-year intervals. The most recent survey of trumpeter swans occurred in 2015. The survey assesses trumpeter swan abundance and productivity throughout the entire breeding ranges of the three recognized North American populations: the Pacific Coast (PCP), Rocky Mountain (RMP), and Interior (IP) populations (see Figure). From 1968 to 2010 the population has increased from 3,722 to approximately 46,225 birds, in large part due to re-introductions to the species' historic range.

The breeding habitat of trumpeter swans includes large and shallow ponds, undisturbed lakes, pristine wetlands, wide and slow rivers, and marshes in northwestern and central North America. The largest numbers of breeding pairs are found in Alaska. Trumpeter swans prefer nesting sites with enough surface water for them to have space to take off, as well as accessible and reliable food sources, shallow, unpolluted water, and little to no human disturbance. Natural populations migrate in V-shaped flocks to and from the Pacific coast and portions of the United States. Released populations are mostly non-migratory.

In the winter, trumpeter swans migrate to the southern tier of Canada, the eastern part of the northwest United States (especially to the Red Rock Lakes area of Montana), and the northern area of the Puget Sound region of Washington state; migratory populations have even been observed as far south as Pagosa Springs, Colorado. Historically, the range of trumpeter swans extended as far south as Texas and southern California. Since 1992, trumpeter swans have also been found in Arkansas each November–February on Magness Lake, outside of Heber Springs. In addition, the collection of the Museum of Comparative Zoology in Cambridge, Massachusetts, includes a specimen that was shot by F. B. Armstrong in 1909 at Matamoros, Tamaulipas, Mexico. C. buccinator is currently considered extirpated from Mexico. In early 2017, a juvenile trumpeter swan took up residence in the French Broad River in Asheville, North Carolina, marking the first such sighting in that part of the state.

Non-migratory trumpeter swans have also been artificially introduced to some areas of Oregon. Largely due to their natural beauty, they are suitable waterfowl to attract bird watchers and other wildlife enthusiasts. Introductions of non-indigenous species in the Western states, for example through the Oregon Trumpeter Swan Program (OTSP), have also been met with criticism, but the introduction program argues that the perceived attractiveness of natural sites has priority over the original range of any given species.

Occasional sightings of trumpeter swans have occurred in the United Kingdom; while some of these are believed to be vagrants, most are presumed escapes into the wild. A single instance of the species breeding in the United Kingdom is reported from 1997, where two swans out of a group that escaped from a wildfowl collection at Apethorpe Palace, Northamptonshire raised a single cygnet on the River Nene.

== Diet ==
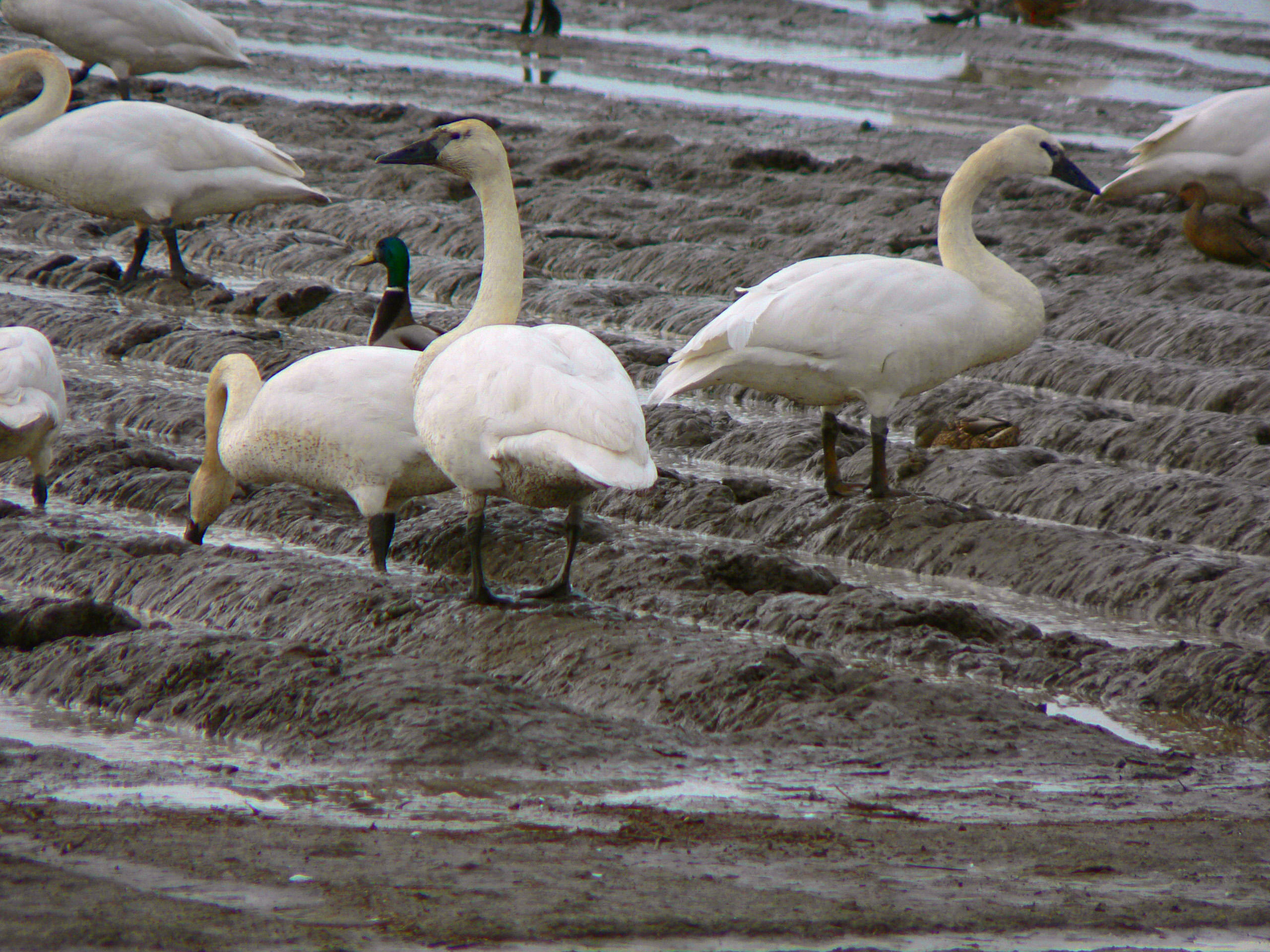
In winter, they may eat crop remnants in agricultural fields, but more commonly they feed while swimming

These birds feed while swimming, sometimes up-ending or dabbling in reaching submerged food. The diet is almost entirely aquatic plants and occasionally insects. They will eat both the leaves and stems of submerged and emergent vegetation. They will also dig into muddy substrates underwater to extract roots and tubers. In winter, they may also eat grasses and grains in fields. They will often feed at night as well as by day. Feeding activity, and the birds' weights, often peak in the spring as they prepare for the breeding season. The young initially include insects, small fish, fish eggs and small crustaceans in their diet, providing additional protein, and change to a vegetation-based diet over the first few months.

== Predators and mortality ==
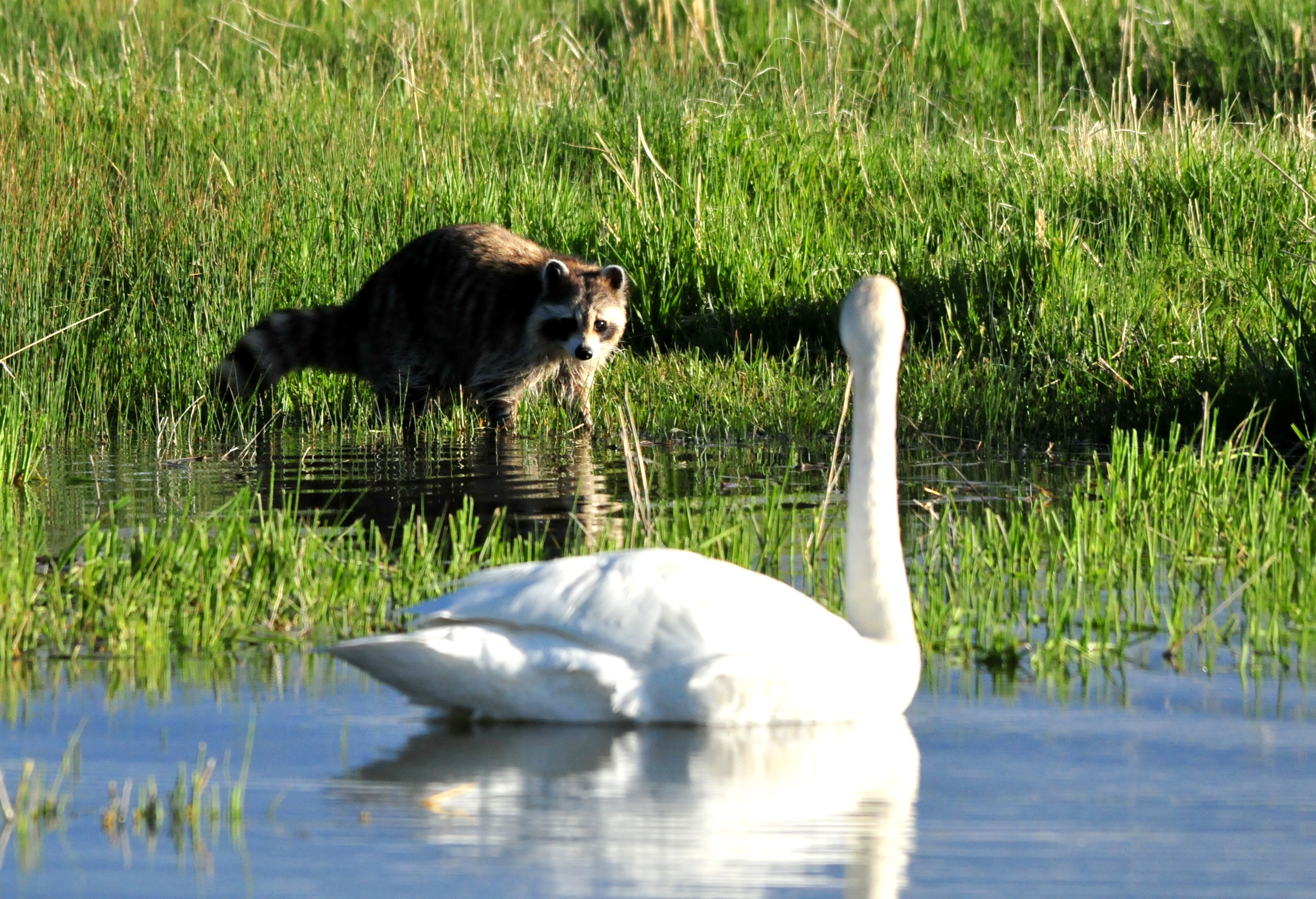
Trumpeter swan and a common raccoon (Procyon lotor). Healthy adults are largely invulnerable to predation, but chicks and eggs are targeted by raccoons.

Predators of trumpeter swan eggs include common ravens (Corvus corax), common raccoons (Procyon lotor), wolverines (Gulo gulo), American black bears (Ursus americanus), grizzly bears (Ursus arctos horribilis), coyotes (Canis latrans), gray wolves (Canis lupus), pumas (Puma concolor), and North American river otters (Lontra canadensis). Nest location can provide partial protection from most mammalian nest predators, especially if placed on islands or floating vegetation in deep waters. Most of the same predators will prey on young cygnets, as well as common snapping turtles (Chelhydra serpentina), California gulls (Larus californicus), great horned owls (Bubo virginianus), red foxes (Vulpes vulpes) and American mink (Neogale vison). Larger cygnets and, rarely, nesting adults may be ambushed by golden eagles (Aquila chrysaetos), bobcats (Lynx rufus), and probably coyotes, wolves and pumas.

When their eggs and young are threatened, the parents can be quite aggressive, initially displaying with head bobbing and hissing. If this is not sufficient, the adults will physically combat the predator, battering with their powerful wings. Adults have managed to beat predators equal to their own weight such as coyotes in confrontations. Predation of adults, when they are not nesting, is extremely rare; golden and bald eagles, and coyotes can pose a threat, but substantiated cases are very few. Photos of an exceptional attack by a bald eagle (Haliaeetus leucocephalus) on an adult trumpeter swan in flight were taken in 2008, although the swan survived the predation attempt. In another case, a coyote succeeded in killing an injured adult trumpeter swan.

In captivity, members of this species have survived to 33 years old and, in the wild, have lived to at least 24 years. Young trumpeter swans may have as little as 40% chance of survival due variously to disturbance and destruction by humans, predation, nest flooding, and starvation. In some areas, though, the breeding success rate is considerably greater and, occasionally, all cygnets may reach maturity. Mortality in adults is quite low, with the survival rate usually being 80–100% annually, unless they are hunted by humans.

== Breeding behaviour ==
=== Courtship and mate choice behaviours ===
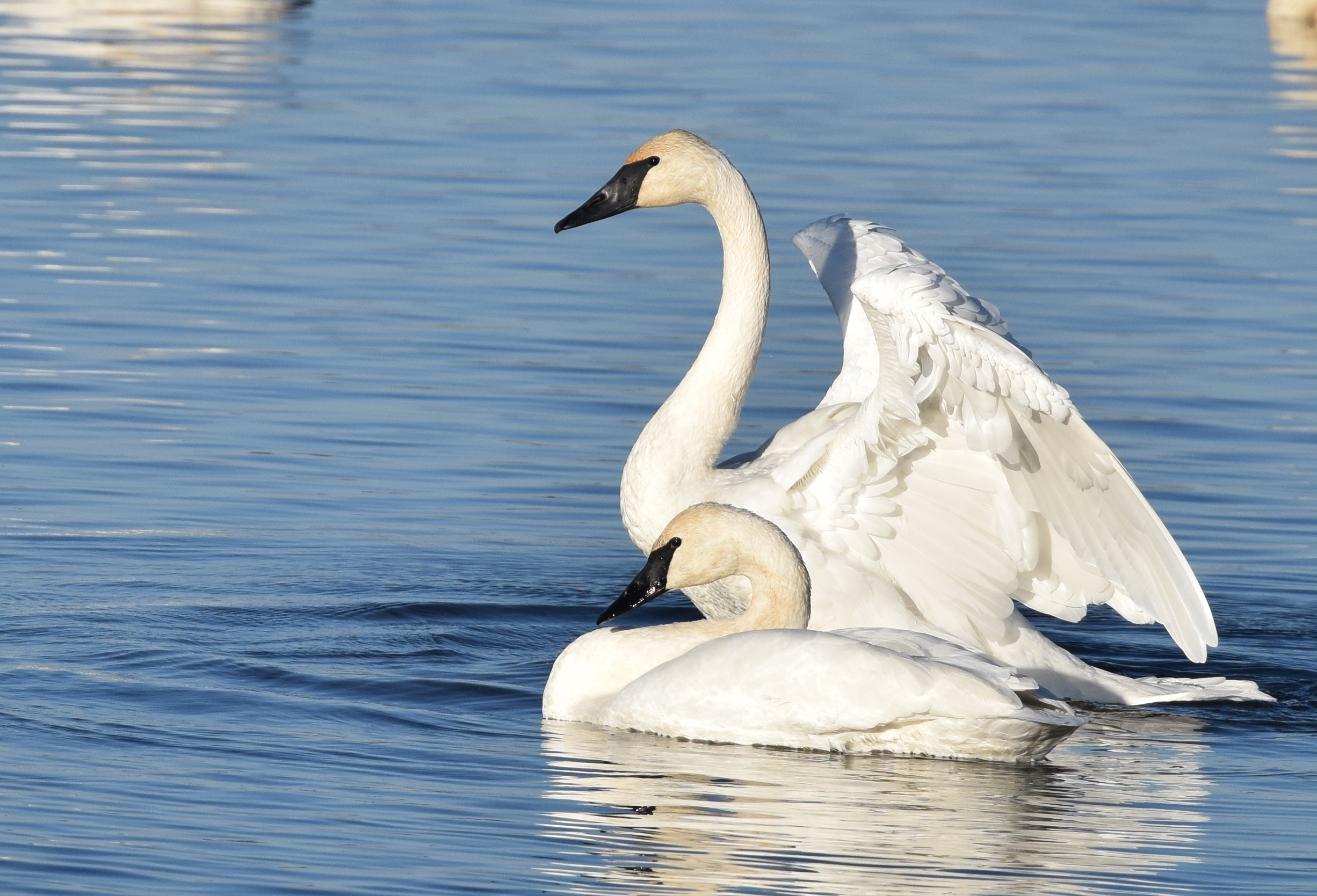
Trumpeter swan pair in Riverlands Migratory Bird Sanctuary.

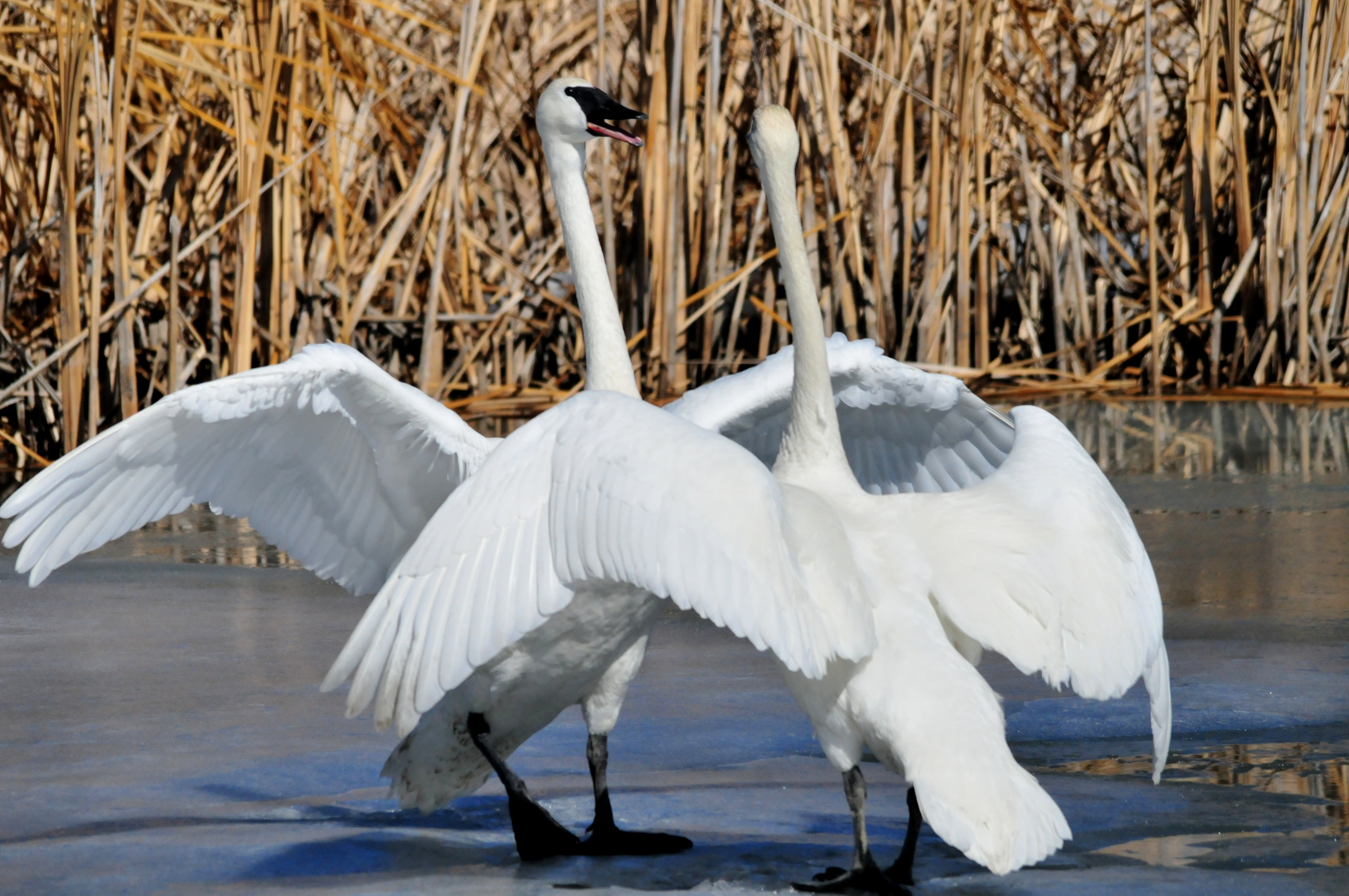
Trumpeter swan courtship in Seedskadee National Wildlife Refuge.

Like other swans, trumpeter swans often mate for life, and both parents participate in raising their young, but primarily the female incubates the eggs. Most pair bonds are formed when swans are 5 to 7 years old, although some pairs do not form until they are nearly 20 years old. "Divorces" have been known between birds, in which case the mates will be serially monogamous, with mates in differing breeding seasons. Occasionally, if his mate dies, a male trumpeter swan may not pair again for the rest of his life.

In late April, breeding pairs meet to begin the process of constructing a nest, which can take 11 to 35 days. Before this grueling process can come to be, much like many other species of birds, these creatures undergo several courtship rituals. Trumpeter swans have a strong tendency to avoid interactions with conspecifics, therefore it is implied that at first contact of a potential mating pair there is some unwillingness in the male and female to make this connection.

In order to overcome the initial encounter, two common displays can occur. At first, the male tends to pursue the female in a non-aggressive way. When the female allows the approach, the male will touch the breast of its body to the flank of the female which then causes both individuals to touch the breasts of their bodies together. At this point the feathers on the neck of the male are stood up and the bills of the mating pair are pointed down indicating pacification. Another act of courtship occurs when a male swims in the direction of a possible mate and continuously turns its head from side to side to get the attention or perhaps impress the female. Other common behavioral displays presented by the pair include spreading and raising their wings, the rapid or almost quivering motion of the wings, particular head motions that include bobbing, and finally the most known (and what the name of this animal originates) is the trumpeting that occurs.

Acoustic communication among trumpeter swans is very common among all ages of the species. From the young cygnets to the adult swans, their calls are very distinct and have a wide variety of functions in the survival of the animal. The classic trumpet call can be heard from long distances and is the most common communication mechanism heard among these birds. This type of call resembles a horn because the frequency can vary greatly. This call generally occurs when an animal is alarmed or feels threatened, the call acts as a warning or even a way in deterring incoming predators due to the abrupt volume of the noise being evoked. More specifically referring to mating, the call that is most common among mating pairs is called the duet. This call happens when a pair has come together near breeding season. The duetting process can begin as separate trumpeting solos and can evolve into an almost simultaneous duet that is very similar in frequency and very difficult to tell the individual calls apart.

This performance of the pair is commonly associated with the particular movements mentioned above (head bobbing and wing movements) associated with the courtship. Also, the duet can aid in the coordination of a dual attack on a predator that is too close to the nest of a mated pair. In terms of mate choice, the trumpeter swan continually returns to the mate from previous breeding terms. Often the breeding pair will even return to their previous breeding grounds if the previous offspring were successful in that area.

Though the range of the two species does not overlap, the trumpeter swan can hybridize with its close relative, the whooper swan (Cygnus cygnus), and hybrid birds have been observed in the wild, most likely as a result of interbreeding between wild trumpeter and vagrant or introduced whooper swans.

=== Nesting and incubation behaviour ===
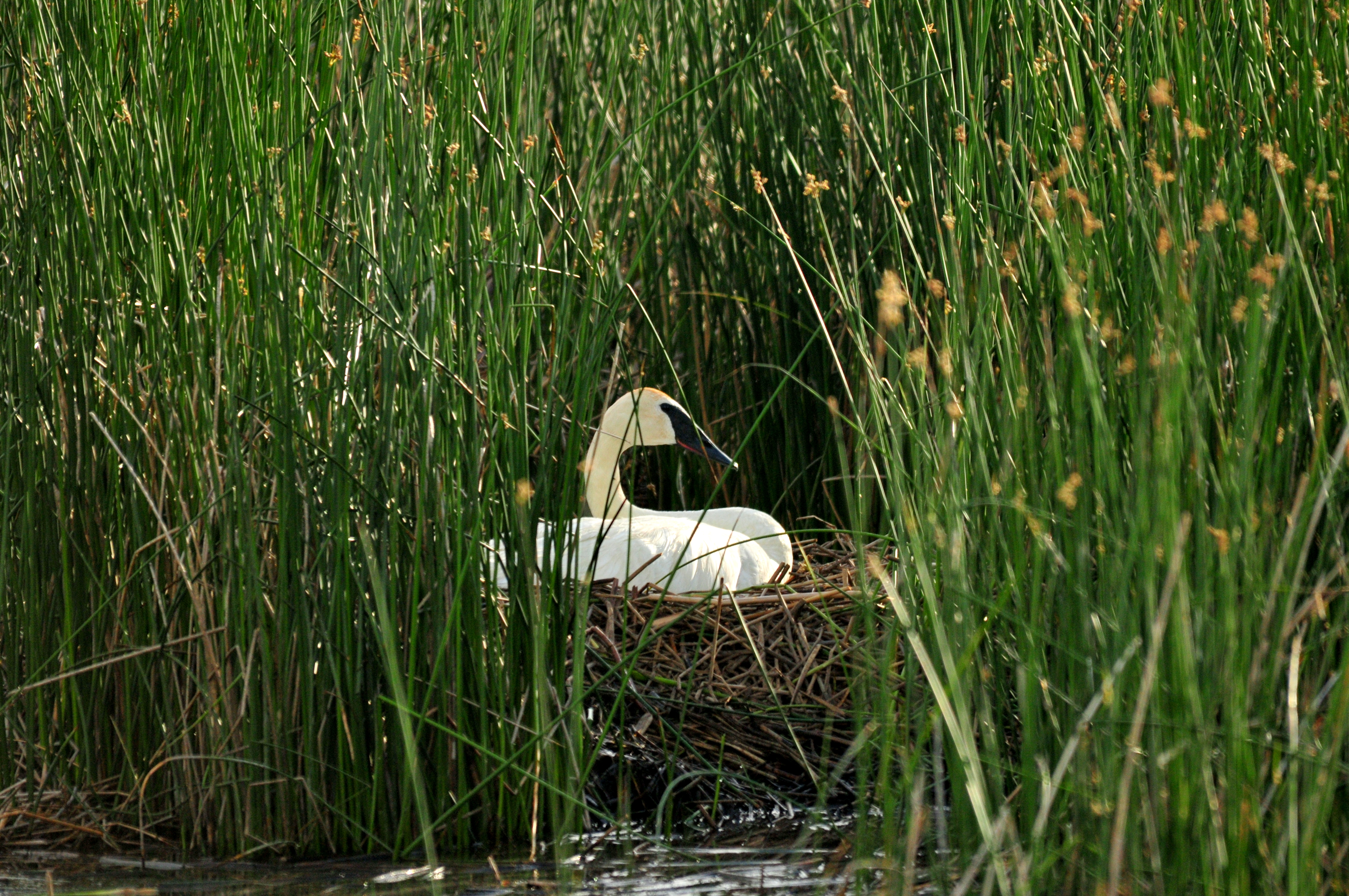
Trumpeter swan incubation.

The fabrication of a nest is an incredibly precise process that takes place over a series of 11 to 35 days and typically breeding pairs will begin construction in late April. The time of year the nest-building process begins can slightly vary due to weather conditions in the previous year; if the environment was colder and wet the females may not be healthy enough to be mating right away and as a result, the nesting behavior might be slightly delayed. It is common to find nests of trumpeter swans surrounded by water or close to water. This is advantageous to the parents because it can reduce the risk of predation, provide optimal foraging sources such as aquatic vegetation, as well as ensure there is nearby water for when the cygnets are hatched.

The long duration of the nest building process is predominantly due to the nest being so large (1.2 to 3.6m in diameter) and fabricated mainly from submerged vegetation as well as grasses and grass-like plants. It has been observed that adult trumpeter swans do not bring the building materials directly to the nest building site. The males use a specific action that includes facing away from the nest and throwing organic materials over their shoulder moving closer and closer to the nesting area. Eventually when they arrive at the nesting site the mating pair are both involved in the construction, but, as mentioned above the male spends the majority of his time doing the construction. During nest construction, female trumpeter swans feed significantly more frequently than males in preparation for laying the eggs. This is greatly supported by the male counterpart of the species because ultimately if the female is keeping herself healthy it will, in the end, ensure healthy offspring which improves the fitness of the mating pair.

Typically a female trumpeter swan will lay four to six eggs and will incubate them for 32 to 37 days until they hatch. The eggs average 73 millimetres (2.9 in) wide, 113.5 millimetres (4.5 in) long, and weigh about 320 grams (11.3 oz). Egg size can range even larger than these values, up to 126 mm (5 in) long and 81 mm (3.2 in) wide. The eggs are quite possibly the largest of any flying bird alive today; in comparison they are about 20% larger in dimensions and mass than those of an Andean condor (Vultur gryphus), which attains similar average adult weights, and more than twice as heavy as those of kori bustards (Ardeotis kori).

After the eggs are laid it is the female that spends the majority of the time incubating. It has been observed that around every 20 minutes the female will stand up from incubating and reach down beneath herself to roll over the eggs with her bill before re-assuming the incubation position. It can be inferred that this behaviour is used to ensure the eggs are kept an appropriate temperature on all sides; this is crucial because exposure to the elements leads to high mortality rates in cygnets. The female only leaves the incubation process for brief recesses that last around 20 minutes. Before she leaves, she will cover the eggs with plant material. It has been observed that if the female does not cover the eggs the male will do so in her absence. This time away from the nest is primarily used for feeding, but the female has also been observed using this time for bathing and preening.

The only other time the female leaves the nest is when she must help the male chase away predators from their nesting territory. It is rare for both members of a mating pair to be absent from the nest at the same time, and there is generally always a male or a female present guarding the eggs. The behavior of the male during and after the laying of the eggs can be best described as on alert. This is due to males being increasingly territorial and aggressive, particularly when a predator or conspecifics approach the nesting area. Generally when females leave the nest during their brief recesses the males will stand and guard the eggs, although in some cases the males would even sit on the eggs in the absence of a female swan.

=== Parental behaviour ===
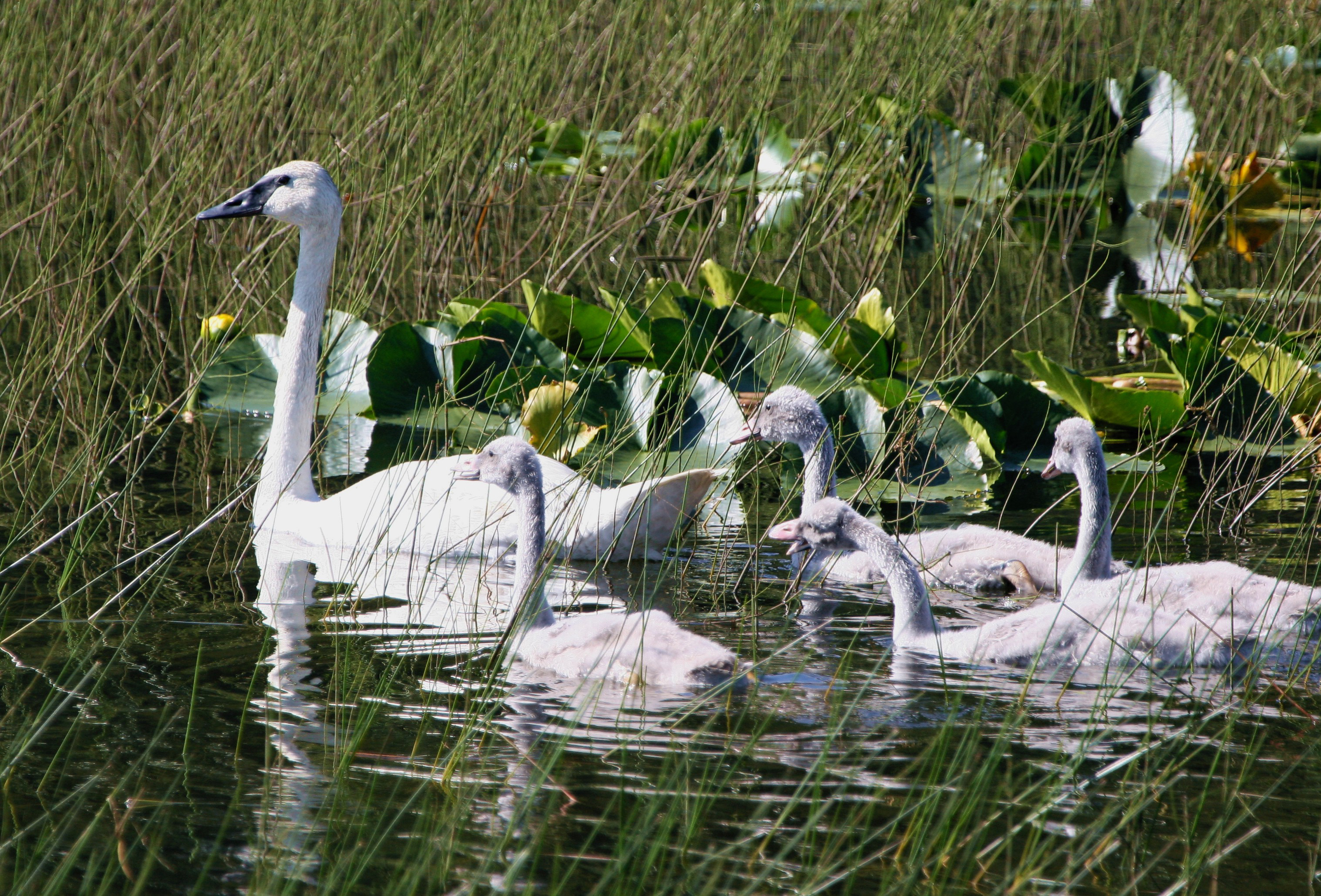
Trumpeter swan brood

==== Males ====
After the meeting of the pair prior to mating or nest building, the male will often initiate courting calls which result in the duet mentioned above. Before and throughout the laying period, the male can be found dealing with the construction of the nest and collection of resources. As the eggs are being incubated by the female the male does not feed or sleep as often, particularly when the female leaves the nest. These trends also were associated with more aggressive behaviors from the male, especially towards predators and other members of the species.

When it comes to parental behaviour, the male has already completed the majority of his role. With this in mind, he does continue to be territorial and protective of the newly developing cygnets as well as allowing the female to replenish her nutrient reserves. This makes migration to wintering grounds possible and allows for more years of breeding. Keeping the female of the mating pair healthy is important for trumpeter swans because this species tends to only have one mate in its lifetime. A healthy female also improves the likelihood of having more successful clutches as well as better nesting experiences. When cygnets are young it is common to see the male accompanying them in feeding recesses outside the nest. This can fall under the category of the main male role in parenting being the protection of the offspring.

==== Females ====
The increased care and attention of the male to the young allows for the female to feed more frequently and exert more energy toward the protection and overall health of the developing cygnets. During the pre-laying/laying period the males are significantly more active than the females of the breeding pair. This is advantageous because it aids in the fitness of the species by improving reproductive success by allowing the female, as mentioned above, to feed more frequently and replenish the energy stored in order to aid in incubation and other crucial activities. When hatching occurs the females tend to not leave the nest. The only time she may leave would be to chase away a nearby predator.

After hatching the cygnets are brooded for the first one to two days by the female. Cygnets are also brooded when needed (when it is cold or at night) for the first few weeks of their lives. Young cygnets have a very close relationship with their parents in the first part of their lives, spending most of their first few weeks with the female in the nest or in the water. The young are able to swim within two days and usually are capable of feeding themselves after at most two weeks. The fledging stage is reached at roughly 3 to 4 months. Fledglings tend to spend their first full winter with their parents and then they no longer need them.

== Conservation status ==
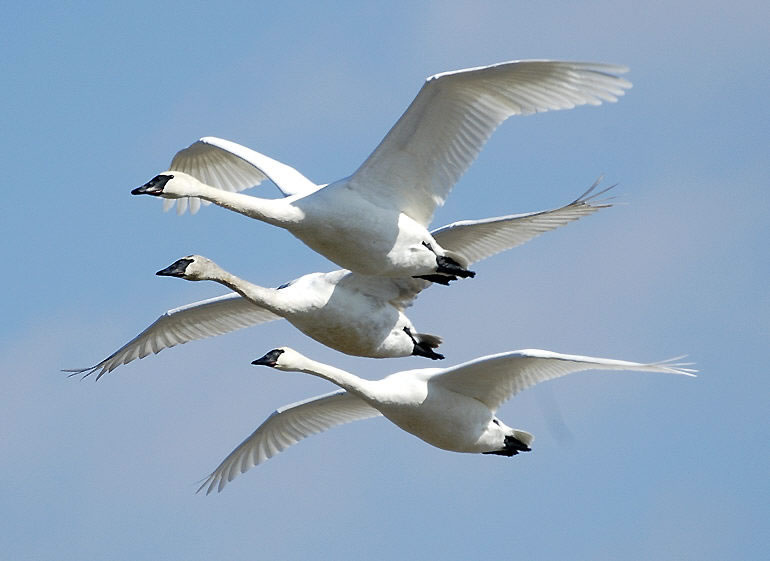
Three flying in Missouri

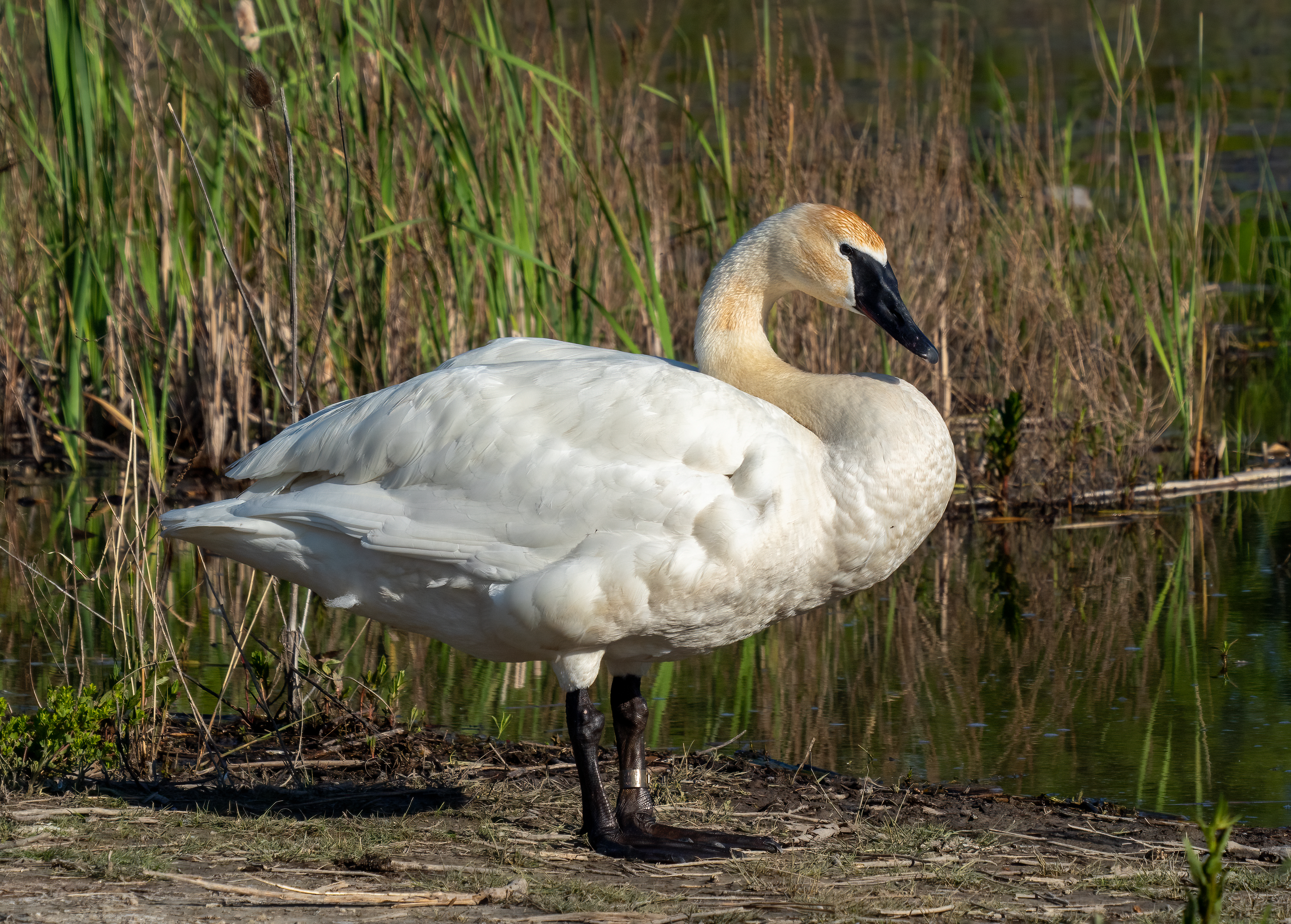
Adult in Toronto

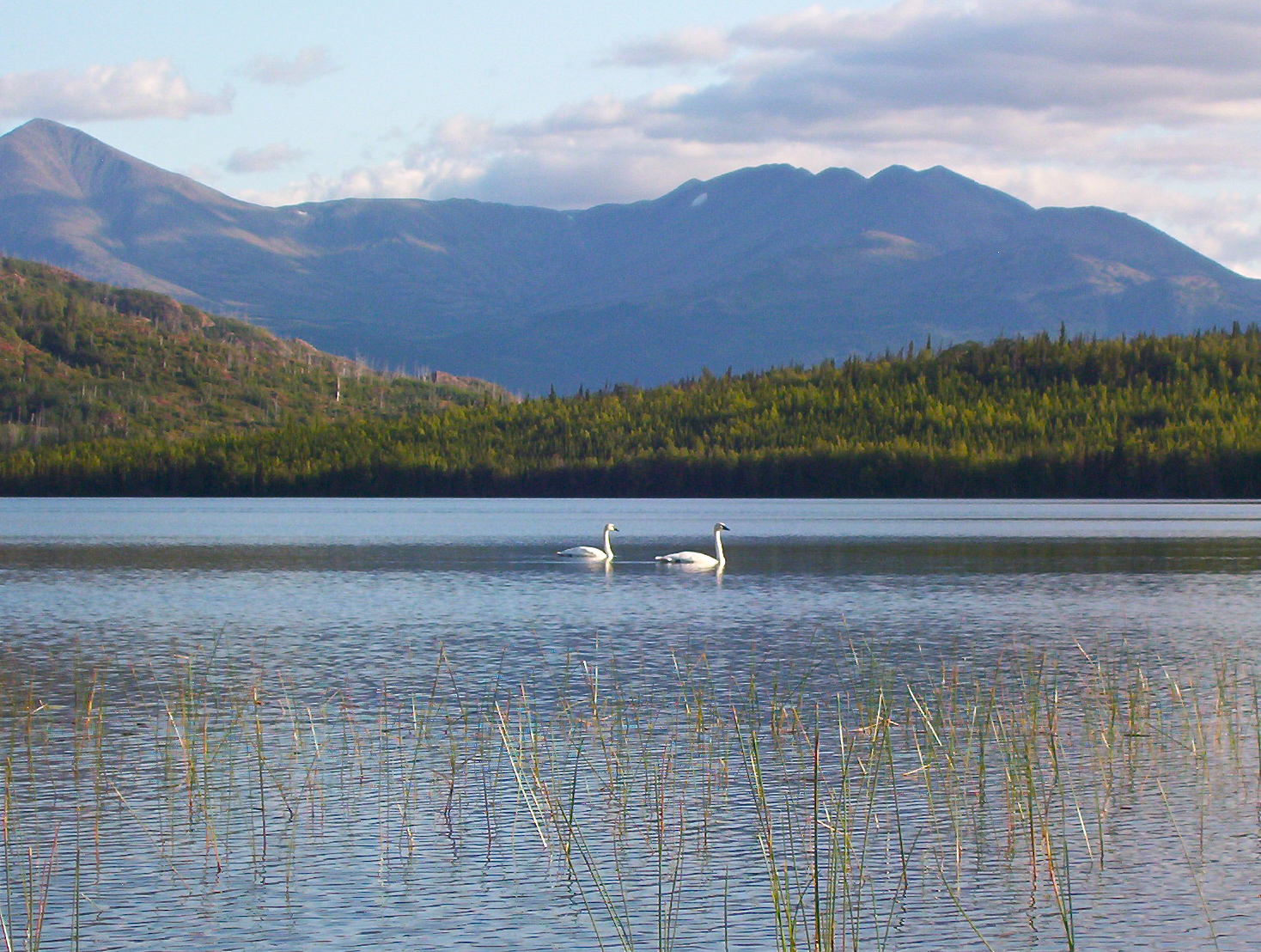
Mated pair on a lake, Kenai National Wildlife Refuge, Alaska

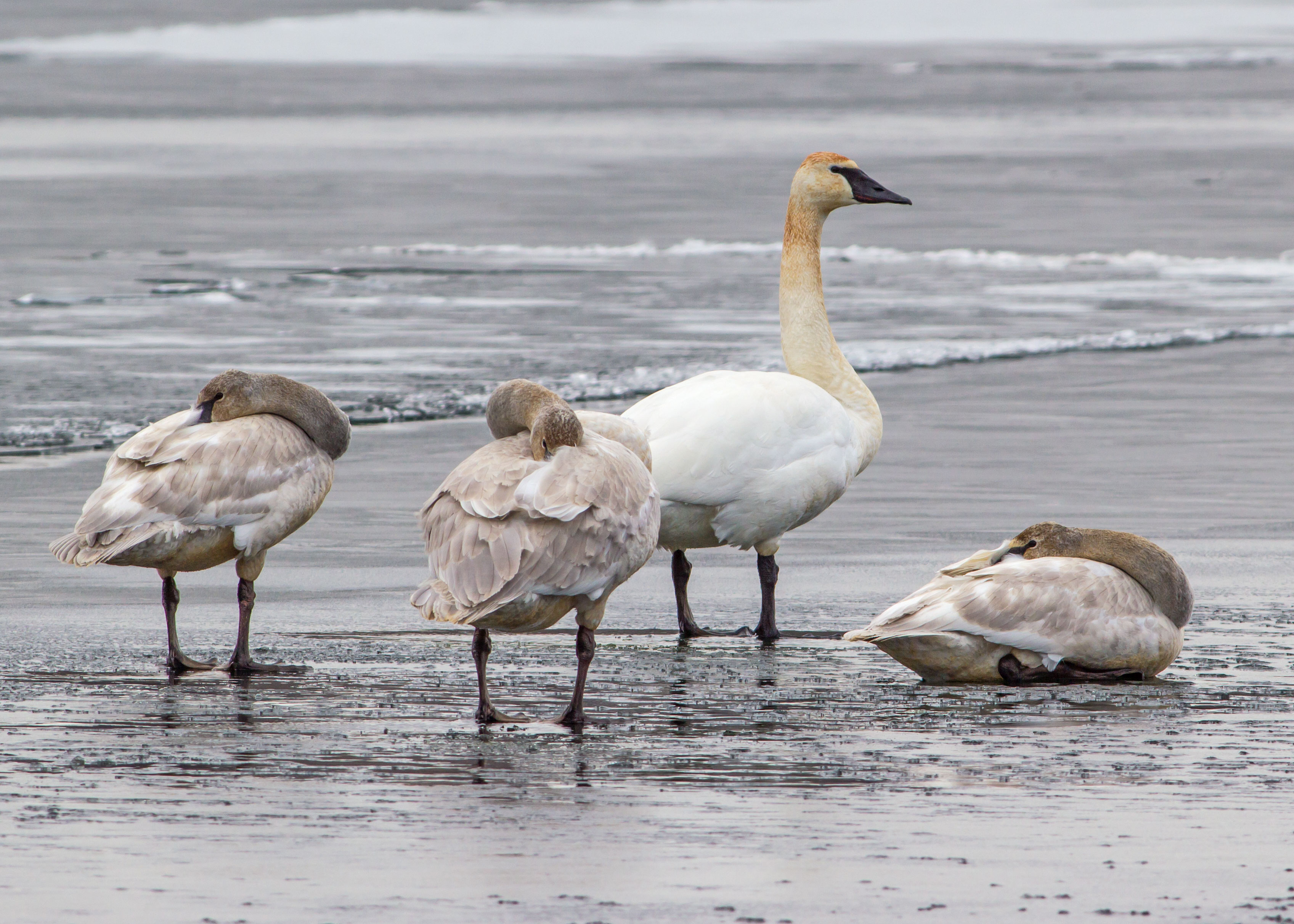
Adult and three juvenile trumpeter swans on the shore of Wood Lake, near Oyama, British Columbia

=== Near extinction and rediscovery in Alaska ===
In the 19th and early 20th centuries, the trumpeter swan was hunted heavily, for game or meat, for the soft swanskins used in powder puffs, and for their quills and feathers. This species is also unusually sensitive to lead poisoning from ingesting discarded lead shot from fishing weights while young. The Hudson's Bay Company captured thousands of swans annually with a total of 17,671 swans killed between 1853 and 1877. In 1908 Edward Preble wrote of the decline in the hunt with the number sold annually dropping from 1,312 in 1854 to 122 in 1877.

Sir John Richardson wrote in 1831 that the trumpeter "is the most common Swan in the interior of the fur-counties. ... It is to the trumpeter that the bulk of the Swan-skins imported by the Hudson's Bay Company belong." By the early twentieth century breeding trumpeter swans were nearly extirpated in the United States, with a remnant population of fewer than 70 wild trumpeters in remote hot springs in or near Yellowstone National Park. Surprising news came from a 1950s aerial survey of Alaska's Copper River when several thousand trumpeters were discovered. This population provided critical genetic stock to complement the tri-state (Montana/Idaho/Wyoming) population for re-introductions in other parts of the swan's historic range.

=== Historical range ===
In 1918 Joseph Grinnell wrote that trumpeter swans once bred in North America from northwestern Indiana west to Oregon in the U.S., and in Canada from James Bay to the Yukon, and they migrated as far south as Texas and southern California. In 1960 Winston E. Banko also placed their breeding range as far south as Nebraska, Missouri, Illinois, northwestern Indiana, but in Michigan turned this line northwards, placing a hypothetical eastern boundary up through Ontario to western Quebec and the eastern shore of James Bay.

In 1984, Harry G. Lumsden posited that trumpeter swans may have been extirpated from eastern Canada by native people armed with firearms prior to the arrival of European explorers and noted archaeological remains of trumpeter swans as far east as Port au Choix, Newfoundland, dating to 2,000 BCE. He cited historical observer records of what must have been breeding trumpeters, such as Father Hennepin's August report of swans on the Detroit River from Lake St. Clair to Lake Erie in 1679 and Antoine de la Mothe Cadillac's 1701 report of summering swans (July 23 – October 8) in the same area: "There are such large numbers of swans that the rushes among which they are massed might be taken for lilies." In the eastern United States the breeding range is potentially extended to North Carolina by the detailed report of John Lawson (1701) that "Of the swans we have two sorts, the one we call Trompeters...These are the largest sort we have...when spring comes on they go the Lakes to breed" versus "The sort of Swans called Hoopers; are the least."

=== Reintroduction ===
Early efforts to reintroduce this bird into other parts of its original range, and to introduce it elsewhere, have had modest success, as suitable habitats have dwindled and the released birds do not undertake migrations. More recently, the population in all three major population regions have shown sustained growth over the past thirty-year period. Data from the US Fish and Wildlife Service show 400% growth in that period, with signs of increasing growth rates over time.

One impediment to the growth of the trumpeter swan population around the Great Lakes is the presence of a growing non-native mute swan population who compete for habitat.

=== Alberta ===
One of the largest conservation sites for the trumpeter swan is located in Lois Hole Provincial Park. It is located adjacent to the renamed Trumpeter subdivision of Edmonton, Alberta, within Big Lake.

=== Idaho ===
Thousands of swans migrate through the Chain Lakes along the Coeur d'Alene River basin in the Idaho Panhandle. Due to historic mining in the area, an average of 52 swans died each year 2005–2021 from lead exposure. There is an effort by local foundations, Idaho Department of Fish and Game, and the United States Environmental Protection Agency to clean up the area and help limit lead exposure of swans migrating through.

=== Michigan ===
Joe Johnson, a biologist for the W.K. Kellogg Bird Sanctuary, part of Michigan State University's Kellogg Biological Station, obtained trumpeter swans from Alaska for re-introduction to Michigan beginning in 1986. The population has grown via continued re-introductions and organic growth to 756 birds by 2015. The native swans have benefited from removal of non-native mute swans by the Michigan Department of Natural Resources beginning in the 1960s, with a decline from 15,000 mute swans in 2010 to 8,700 in 2015.

=== Minnesota ===
As of 2013, the trumpeter swan is no longer listed as threatened in the state of Minnesota. In the winter months, a large population of trumpeter swans can be seen in the city of Monticello, Minnesota.

=== Ontario ===
The Ontario Trumpeter Swan Restoration Group started a conservation project in 1982, using eggs collected in the wild. Live birds have also been taken from the wild. Since then, 584 birds have been released in Ontario. Despite lead poisoning in the wild from shotgun pellets, the prospects for restoration are considered optimistic. As of 2021, the population was between 2500 and 3000, was stable, and no longer relied on rehabilitation facilities.

=== Yellowstone National Park ===
Yellowstone National Park provides only marginal habitat for trumpeter swans and therefore may be limited to occasional residents and wintering migrants. Park biologists attribute the decline in the park's population to the loss of nests and nesting sites because of spring flooding caused by climate change. In 2023, Yellowstone biologists observed 29 trumpeter swans in the park: 26 adults and 3 cygnets.

== See also ==
- Grande Prairie, Alberta, Canada – The "Swan City" is located in an important trumpeter swan breeding area, and several pairs usually nest in urban parks
- Ralph Edwards, a leading Canadian conservationist of trumpeter swans
- The Trumpet of the Swan, a 1970 children's novel by E. B. White.
