= Reindeer(s) Are Better Than People =

Song by Jonathan Groff

from the album Frozen
- Published: Wonderland Music Company
- Released: November 25, 2013
- Recorded: 2012
- Genre: Folk music, Show tune
- Length: 0:50
- Label: Walt Disney
- Songwriters: Kristen Anderson-Lopez; Robert Lopez
- Producers: Kristen Anderson-Lopez; Robert Lopez; Christophe Beck; Chris Montan; Tom MacDougall

"Reindeer(s) Are Better Than People" is a 50-second song from the 2013 Disney animated film Frozen, originally performed by actor and singer Jonathan Groff in his vocal role as Kristoff. Groff gave a shorter reprisal of the song in the 2019 sequel, Frozen 2.

== Synopsis ==
This song happens after Oaken tries to make Kristoff pay more money than he has on his person at the moment for his carrots (for Sven), pickaxe, and rope. They can't reach a compromise, and Kristoff calls Oaken a crook. Oaken does not like being called a crook, so he tosses Kristoff out into the cold. Kristoff then seeks shelter with Sven in a nearby stable.

This song illustrates Kristoff's unique relationship with Sven. He is a shy, isolated man who can only be himself when around his pet reindeer. From Director notes "Kristoff's only friend is his reindeer Sven and he rejects the human race in favor of his pet ("every one of them's bad," he sings in 'Reindeer(s) Are Better Than People')".

== International versions ==
The Korean language version sung by Jung Sang-yoon appeared on the Gaon Music Chart's download sub-chart; however, it did not appear on the main Gaon Singles Chart.

The Italian version, along with the whole Italian adaptation of the movie, was awarded best foreign dubbing worldwide.

As the sequel features a short reprise of the song, a version in these three languages was recorded for the second movie. As with Moana with Tahitian, Māori and Hawaiian versions, the Sami version was an exceptional dubbing made specifically for the movie, due to the inspiration it took from Sami culture.

Since 2013, some local TV stations have been dubbing the movie in their local languages. Namely: Abkhaz, Albanian, Arabic, Kabardian, Karachay-Balkar, Persian and Tagalog.

=== Charts ===
Chart (2013–14)	Peak position
South Korea (Gaon International Chart)	17
South Korea (Gaon Chart)	127

== Reindeers Remix ==
A deleted song dubbed Reindeer(s) Are Better Than People (remix) was designed as a joke song for Kristoff to perform during the credits, as Lopez and Anderson-Lopez felt sad that Jonathan Groff had not been given a real song. They reasoned that his character is not the type to have burst into song that way, and though he becomes a lot more confident and self-assured after the troll song "Fixer Upper", by that time the film becomes action-packed and can't afford to slow down for another song.

When asked the question "I was wondering, you know, because I think I had talked to you earlier and you were like, wow, we had this great, amazing Broadway singer and he, you know, just wasn't used that much in the movie", Robert Lopez responded: "Well, we hope to rectify that for Frozen, the musical. If we — if we do get a chance to write that, and we hope to with Disney, we'll give Kristoff a proper song. But that reindeer song was sort of written, you know, because Kristoff had Sven and he could really only talk to Sven, and Sven's this reindeer and he was doing Sven's voice at the same — it was just kind of weird. And he didn't — until the very last act of the film, it wouldn't have made sense for him to break out into a real song".

To AwardsDaily, Robert said "We wanted to write something for [Groff's character] Kristoff… In the beginning we knew that the songs we wrote for the external characters, the secondary characters, were the ones that seemed to be staying. And the ones that we wrote for Anna seemed to keep getting cut as Anna changed and changed and changed. So we wanted to write something for Kristoff. And we wanted to write something for Jonathan Groff. We always assumed we'd write a little bit more. But his character kept denying real songs". Kristen added "In the deluxe version of the soundtrack…there's something called the "Reindeer Remix," which was a remix of "Reindeers Are Better Than People." An expanded version that we wrote, half as a joke, and half as..."Wouldn't it be fun to put this in the credits? To give Jonathan Groff a chance to do what Jonathan Groff does".

== Composition ==
In half of the song, Kristoff sings the song as a duet between himself and "Sven" (with Sven's part merely being Kristoff using a goofy voice). The Rainbow Hub described it as "a Gilbert-and-Sullivan style operetta." AMommyStory described it as " a cute little ditty ". ShepFromTamp argues "The closest the movie comes to [the folksy] theme [of Frozen Heart] ever again is Kristoff's "Reindeer(s) Are Better Than People."" The Huntington News described it as "folksy". TunesReviews describes it as a "short quip". AwardsDaily said "It feels like more of a ditty and less of a production number".

== Critical reception ==
There were generally favourably views toward the song, with it being described as both short and funny. Many reviewers criticized the fact that Jonathan Groff, a Broadway actor, had only been given a one-minute ditty as opposed to a full song.

Rochester City Newspaper wrote ""Reindeer(s) Are Better Than People," "In Summer," and "Fixer Upper" aren't as plot-progressing as the other numbers, but all three have their charms", adding that ""Reindeer(s) Are Better Than People" is a silly little throw-away that I swear was only added once Jonathan Groff was cast so he'd have an excuse to sing". DadInACape wrote " "Reindeer(s) Are Better Than People" is a cute little ditty featuring Jonathan Groff". Erin Stough of Laughing Place wrote "unlike many fans my favorite song from Frozen is not "Let it Go" but "Reindeer(s) Are Better Than People"." GeekExchange writes "Groff does have a hilarious little diddy about reindeer being better than people that will endear guys who feel like they roped into seeing Frozen to Kristoff who really does serve as the dude guys will root for and identify with". It added "Both Groff and Fontana have these great characters but are kinda underused both story-wise and musically but that's okay because the story isn't about who gets the girl." Inkling Press said "You didn't hear much of his singing voice, but he did have a neat, one-minute song called 'Reindeer(s) Are Better Than People.'" AintItCool said the song, along with In Summer, are moments when "Frozen also gets playful". AllMusic said " the tracks that offer comic relief, such as "In Summer" and "Reindeer(s) Are Better Than People," are cleverly written". Johnnegroni.com said of Reindeer Remix "Finally, we have the song that was meant to be the movie's final song, featuring the under-utilized Jonathan Groff. I love it because it would have left the movie on a funny note that captured the fun of the song Groff sings earlier about Sven." Urban Cinephile writes "Anyone who writes songs whose lyrics suggest 'Reindeers are better than people' [is] okay in my book". Captain Pig Heart argues Olaf is "not quite as much fun as the relationship between Kristoff and his reindeer (and their "Reindeer(s) Are Better Than People" song)". VGU.com said "Even the short tune sang by Kristoff's Jonathan Groff, "Reindeer(s) Are Better Than People" was adorably cute and hysterical." EarnThis said "Jonathan Groff is a talented, enjoyable singer, so it's a little bit surprising that he only gets fifty seconds of singing all movie long. But he makes the most of his brief appearance. This is a charming introduction to Kristoff and Sven, the puppy-like reindeer (Frozen's comedic MVP). I love Groff's "reindeer" voice, and everything else about this song. Funny, sweet, charming. I only wish it went on a bit longer."

NerdyMindsMagazine wrote: "Part of what makes Frozen so endearing is its characters' quirks. Few, if any, stand out as much as Kristoff's channeling of Sven's thoughts and emotions, and this is shown at its best in "Reindeer(s) Are Better Than People". It's a duet that's not a duet. It's simple, and it's short. It's not epic, it's not lengthy, and it doesn't really move the plot along, but it shows a tender moment between a man and his reindeer with nothing more than a lute (or a lute-like instrument; we've been unable to find one that matches what he's playing). We get to see how human Sven really is, and we root for them as much as we root for any other couple in the film. I'm just bummed that a) this is the only song that Kristoff gets in the whole film and b) the "Remix" version was left out of the film entirely." Rotoscopers said: "I really love most of the songs, but at the same time I don't like "In Summer" and "Reindeer(s) Are Better Than People at all". These songs just weren't as good as the other songs. Also I hated they gave Jonathan Groff a silly 50-second song. Come on Disney! You hire an amazing artist that can sing beautifully and you give him a song like this? I would be more ok with "In Summer" if Jonathan at least was given another song as big and dramatic as "Let it Go" or "For The First Time in Forever."" The Entertainment Nut wrote "If there's one song that seems wedged into the final product, it's Reindeer(s) Are Better Than People. With Jonathan Groff's vocal talents available, it felt like they had to find some way to get in his talents, and this 51-second piece definitely seems to fit the bill." The Notorious I.G. said the film "has two songs that could get Oscar gold" ("Let It Go" and "For the First Time in Forever"), though added "but "Reindeer(s) Are Better Than People" may be a cult hit." AssignmentX said along with In Summer, the song is an example of "the pleasantly goofier stuff". GeeksOfDoom wrote "Disappointingly, the golden voice of Jonathan Groff only has one opportunity to enter the soundtrack, and it's this brief piece here. It's quite witty and funny, especially when he responds to his own impersonation of Sven." Animation Unplugged said "Reindeer(s) Are Better Than People made me laugh, but I felt like it stopped the film." HeyUGuys said "'Reindeer(s) Are Better Than People' is no more than a forgettable ditty that's lucky to be on the soundtrack at all", and described it as a "miss", along with Frozen Heart. ALookAtDisney wrote "granted not all of the songs are great such as "Fixer Upper" or "Reindeer(s) Are Better Than People"". The Kilt said ""Reindeer(s) Are Better Than People" and "In Summer" don't assist in the progression of the plot, but are all valuable to the soundtrack. One part madness and two parts silliness; there really is no point for "Reindeer(s) Are Better Than People." It's a fun, short, duet between Jonathan Groff and himself."

== Certifications ==
Region	Certification	Certified units/sales
United Kingdom (BPI)	Silver	200,000^{‡}
United States (RIAA)	Gold	500,000^{‡}
^{‡} Sales+streaming figures based on certification alone.
