= Just Sing =

2016 video game

- Developer: iNiS
- Publisher: Ubisoft
- Series: Just Dance
- Engine: Unity
- Platforms: PlayStation 4 Xbox One
- Release: WW: September 6, 2016
- Genre: Music

Just Sing is a karaoke music video game developed by iNiS and published by Ubisoft, which was released for PlayStation 4 and Xbox One on September 6, 2016, as a spin-off title to the Just Dance series. The online features of Just Sing were discontinued in June 2018, after eighteen months of operations. Non-online features to the game remain available.

== Gameplay ==
Just Sing is divided into "Party" and "Battle" modes; Party mode allows players to record lip sync music videos, while Battle is a competitive mode. The game supports the use of a companion mobile app for Android and iOS smartphones, which utilizes the device's internal microphone and camera in-game (as opposed to a wired USB microphone). Kinect and PlayStation Camera can also be used to record video footage.

== Soundtrack ==
The following songs are included in the game:

Song	Artist	Year
"All About That Bass"	Meghan Trainor	2014
"All of Me"	John Legend	2013
"Baby One More Time"	Britney Spears	1998
"Call Me Maybe"	Carly Rae Jepsen	2012
"Can You Feel the Love Tonight"	Elton John (Disney's The Lion King)	1994
"Can't Feel My Face"	The Weeknd	2015
"Chandelier"	Sia	2014
"Colors of the Wind"	Disney's Pocahontas	1995
"Counting Stars"	OneRepublic	2013
"Don't Worry, Be Happy"	Bobby McFerrin	1988
"Drag Me Down"	One Direction	2015
"Focus"	Ariana Grande	2015
"Girls Just Want to Have Fun"	Cyndi Lauper	1983
"Hallelujah"	Leonard Cohen	1984
"I Love Rock 'n' Roll"	The Arrows	1975
"I Want to Break Free" (Note: Also available on the trial version of the game)	Queen	1984
"I Want You Back"	Jackson 5	1969
"I Will Survive"	Gloria Gaynor	1978
"It's Raining Men"	The Weather Girls	1983
"Kryptonite"	3 Doors Down	2000
"Let Her Go"	Passenger	2012
"Let It Go"	Idina Menzel (Disney's Frozen)	2013
"Love Me Like You Do"	Ellie Goulding	2015
"Love Shack"	The B-52s	1989
"My Heart Will Go On"	Celine Dion	1997
"No One"	Alicia Keys	2007
"One More Night"	Maroon 5	2012
"Radioactive"	Imagine Dragons	2012
"Relax, Take It Easy"	Mika	2007
"Rude"	Magic!	2013
"Shut Up and Dance"	Walk the Moon	2014
"Stand by Me"	Ben E. King	1961
"Stay"	Rihanna featuring Mikky Ekko	2012
"Stitches"	Shawn Mendes	2015
"Take On Me"	a-ha	1985
"Torn"	Natalie Imbruglia	1997
"The Fox (What Does the Fox Say?)"	Ylvis	2013
"Two Princes"	Spin Doctors	1991
"U Can't Touch This"	MC Hammer	1990
"What Do You Mean?"	Justin Bieber	2015
"What's Up"	4 Non Blondes	1992
"When I Was Your Man"	Bruno Mars	2013
"Wonderwall"	Oasis	1995
"Zombie"	The Cranberries	1994

== Ubisoft Connect Unlockables ==
Song	Artist	Year
"Happy Birthday (Rock Version)"	Happy Birthday Songs	1890s
"She'll Be Coming 'Round the Mountain"	1960s Standards	1800s
"Silent Night"	Justin Bieber	2011

== DLC ==
Song	Artist	Year
"A Spoonful of Sugar"	Julie Andrews (Disney's Mary Poppins)	1964
"A Thousand Miles"	Vanessa Carlton	2002
"A Whole New World"	Brad Kane and Lea Salonga (Disney's Aladdin)	1992
"Ain't No Sunshine"	Bill Withers	1971
"All by Myself"	Eric Carmen	1975
"All Through the Night"	Cyndi Lauper	1984
"All Out of Love"	Air Supply	1980
"American Pie"	Don McLean	1971
"Andalouse"	Kendji Girac	2014
"Angels"	Robbie Williams	1997
"Be Our Guest"	Jerry Orbach and Angela Lansbury (Disney's Beauty and the Beast)	1992
"Beauty and the Beast"	Celine Dion and Peabo Bryson (Disney's Beauty and the Beast)	1992
"Behind Those Eyes"	3 Doors Down	2005
"Bennie and the Jets"	Elton John	1974
"Bibbidi-Bobbidi-Boo"	Verna Felton (Disney's Cinderella)	1948
"Blame It on the Girls"	Mika	2010
"Blue Eyes"	Elton John	1982
"Borderline"	Madonna	1984
"Breakfast in America"	Supertramp	1979
"Candle in the Wind"	Elton John	1974
"Can't Smile Without You"	The Carpenters	1975
"Caribbean Queen (No More Love on the Run)"	Billy Ocean	1984
"Chasing the Sun"	The Wanted	2012
"Chim Chim Cher-ee"	Dick Van Dyke (Disney's Mary Poppins)	1964
"Circle of Life"	Elton John (Disney's The Lion King)	1994
"Criminal"	Britney Spears	2011
"Cruella de Vil"	Disney's 101 Dalmatians	1961
"Do You Want to Build a Snowman?"	Kristen Bell, Agatha Lee Monn and Katie Lopez (Disney's Frozen)	2013
"Dog Days Are Over"	Florence + The Machine	2008
"Even the Nights Are Better"	Air Supply	1982
"Ever Ever After"	Carrie Underwood (Disney's Enchanted)	2007
"Everywhere"	Fleetwood Mac	1987
"For the First Time in Forever"	Kristen Bell and Idina Menzel (Disney's Frozen)	2013
"Foundations"	Kate Nash	2007
"Friday I'm in Love"	The Cure	1992
"Friend Like Me"	Robin Williams (Disney's Aladdin)	1992
"Frozen Heart"	Disney's Frozen	2013
"Go the Distance"	Michael Bolton (Disney's Hercules)	1997
"Hand in My Pocket"	Alanis Morissette	1995
"Happy Ending"	Mika	2007
"Happy Working Song"	Amy Adams (Disney's Enchanted)	2007
"Hasta el Amanecer"	Nicky Jam	2016
"Heaven's on Fire"	Kiss	1984
"Hold Me Now"	Thompson Twins	1983
"I Bet My Life"	Imagine Dragons	2014
"I Guess That's Why They Call It the Blues"	Elton John	1983
"I Just Can't Wait to Be King"	Elton John (Disney's The Lion King)	1994
"I See the Light"	Mandy Moore and Zachary Levi (Disney's Tangled)	2010
"I Won't Say (I'm in Love)"	Belinda Carlisle (Disney's Hercules)	1997
"In Summer"	Josh Gad (Disney's Frozen)	2013
"It's My Life"	No Doubt	2003
"Jessie's Girl"	Rick Springfield	1981
"Lean on Me"	Bill Withers	1972
"Les Poissons"	Rene Auberjonois (Disney's The Little Mermaid)	1989
"Lollipop"	Mika	2007
"Love Is an Open Door"	Kristen Bell and Santino Fontana (Disney's Frozen)	2013
"Love Today"	Mika	2006
"Lovefool"	The Cardigans	1996
"Mi Rowsu"	Damaru in duet with Jan Smit	2009
"My Way"	Limp Bizkit	2001
"Never Gonna Leave This Bed"	Maroon 5	2011
"Never Knew I Needed"	Ne-Yo featuring Cassandra Steen (Disney's The Princess and the Frog)	2009
"Night Changes"	One Direction	2014
"Ocean Avenue"	Yellowcard	2003
"Once Upon A Dream"	Lana Del Rey (Disney's Maleficent)	2014
"Original Sin"	INXS	1983
"Part of Your World"	Jodi Benson (Disney's The Little Mermaid)	1989
"Piano Man"	Billy Joel	1973
"Plush"	Stone Temple Pilots	1993
"Pompeii"	Bastille	2013
"Practically Perfect"	Julie Andrews (Disney's Mary Poppins)	1964
"Pretty Little Angel Eyes"	Curtis Lee	1961
"Prince Ali"	Robin Williams (Disney's Aladdin)	1992
"Rockstar"	A Great Big World	2014
"Roseanne"	Nick & Simon	2007
"Ruby"	Kaiser Chiefs	2007
"Sacrifice"	Elton John	1989
"Sailing"	Christopher Cross	1980
"She Will Be Loved"	Maroon 5	2004
"So Close"	Jon McLaughlin (Disney's Enchanted)	2007
"Someday"	Disney's The Hutchback of Notre Dame	1996
"Something That I Want"	Grace Potter (Disney's Tangled)	2010
"Somewhere Only We Know"	Keane	2004
"Sorry Seems to Be the Hardest Word"	Elton John	1976
"Sunday Morning"	Maroon 5	2004
"Sweet Home Alabama"	Lynyrd Skynyrd	1974
"Take Me Out"	Franz Ferdinand	2004
"The Art of Losing"	American Hi-Fi	2003
"These Dreams"	Heart	1986
"This Love"	Maroon 5	2004
"Tiny Dancer"	Elton John	1972
"Under the Sea"	Samuel E. Wright (Disney's The Little Mermaid)	1989
"Uptown Girl"	Billy Joel	1983
"We Are Golden"	Mika	2009
"What a Dog/He's a Tramp"	Peggy Lee (Disney's Lady and the Tramp)	1955
"When Can I See You Again?"	Owl City (Disney's Wreck It Ralph)	2013
"When She Loved Me"	Sarah McLachlan (Disney's Toy Story 2)	1999
"When Will My Life Begin?"	Mandy Moore (Disney's Tangled)	2010
"Wherever You Will Go"	The Calling	2001
"Wind of Change"	Scorpions	1991
"Won't Go Home Without You"	Maroon 5	2007
"Wrecking Ball"	Miley Cyrus	2013
"You Are So Beautiful"	Billy Preston	1974
"You've Got a Friend in Me"	Randy Newman (Disney's Toy Story)	1995
"Your Song"	Elton John	1970
