= Once Upon a Snowman =

2020 American fantasy short film

- Film poster
- Written by: Dan Abraham; Trent Correy
- Directed by: Dan Abraham; Trent Correy
- Starring: Josh Gad; Kristen Bell; Idina Menzel; Jonathan Groff
- Music by: Christophe Beck; Jeff Morrow
- Country of origin: United States
- Original language: English

Production
- Producers: Nicole P. Hearon; Peter Del Vecho
- Cinematography: Tracy Scott Beattie (layout); Mohit Kallianpur (lighting)
- Editor: Jeff Draheim
- Running time: 8 minutes
- Production companies: Walt Disney Animation Studios; Walt Disney Pictures

Original release
- Network: Disney+
- Release: October 23, 2020

Once Upon a Snowman is a 2020 American animated fantasy short film written and directed by Trent Correy and Dan Abraham, and produced by Walt Disney Animation Studios. It was released exclusively on the streaming service Disney+ on October 23, 2020. Set during the events of the film Frozen (2013), the short follows Olaf's early adventures after he is created by Elsa, before he meets Anna, Kristoff, and Sven. Correy drew inspiration for the short from the scene where Elsa creates Olaf while working on Frozen. He and his team sought to maintain continuity and explore a fresh perspective on the original scenes.

== Plot ==
Olaf, the snowman, is brought to life by Elsa while she is at the North Mountain after fleeing her coronation. (Note: As depicted in Frozen (2013)) Before he can do anything, Elsa releases her cloak which flies and knocks him down the mountain side until he crashes into a tree. Not knowing who he is, or why he is alive, Olaf decides to find an identity for himself. He comes upon Wandering Oaken's Trading Post and Sauna, where he overhears Kristoff singing to Sven, before he gets flattened at the front door by an unaware Anna.

Olaf enters the Post and meets Oaken. Olaf asks for a nose, possibly a carrot, for his face, but Oaken explains that he sold the last batch and decides to help him out by trying a variety of other objects. One of the objects is an old fashioned view master that features images of summer. Olaf is immediately taken by it and wants to experience it before settling on a sausage for his nose.

As Olaf happily leaves with his new nose, a pack of wolves suddenly appear and begin to chase him through the snowy tundra, during which Anna and Kristoff can be heard arguing with each other over the concept of love. Olaf passes by them, again unnoticed, which gets the wolves to suddenly shift their attention to them. Olaf continues to slide and witnesses Anna, Kristoff, and Sven leaping across the gorge while ditching their sleigh. Olaf makes it to the bottom where he spots one of the carrots that gets dropped, but it gets crushed by the sleigh.

Olaf's sausage nose breaks, which saddens him. Upon seeing one of the wolves whimpering pitifully at his nose, Olaf gives it to him, believing that he needs it more than him. The wolf happily licks him before leaving. Olaf comments that it felt like a warm hug to which suddenly causes him to remember Anna and Elsa's time playing together as children. Finally realizing who he is, he comments, "I'm Olaf and I like warm hugs."

During the credits, Olaf is seen coming across Anna, Kristoff, and Sven, who eventually give him his carrot nose.

== Cast ==
- Josh Gad as Olaf
- Kristen Bell as Anna
  - Livvy Stubenrauch as Young Anna
- Idina Menzel as Elsa
  - Eva Bella as Young Elsa
- Jonathan Groff as Kristoff
- Chris Williams as Oaken
- Frank Welker as Sven

== Development ==
In 2012, Trent Correy joined the Walt Disney Animation Studios' training program, where he was tasked animating the character Olaf for Frozen (2013). While working on the film, he was inspired by a scene where Elsa creates Olaf which prompted him to explore the narrative of Olaf's origin story and subsequent adventures. Correy expressed his love for classic Disney films like Pinocchio (1940) and Bambi (1942) and his desire to explore Olaf's first steps, similar to the way those films depicted characters' early experiences. He referenced the original sketches from 2013 showcasing ideas of Olaf discovering himself, and he took advantage of Disney+ partnership at D23 Expo to help develop and release the short film.

Dan Abraham joined the project at the recommendation of Frozen co-director Jennifer Lee, who was impressed by his understanding of Olaf's character. Becky Bresee, an animator, found Olaf's story in Once Upon a Snowman particularly special because it tied together Olaf's early moments and provided a fresh perspective on the original scenes. The team enjoyed establishing connections between events, such as the near encounters between Anna and Olaf in the first film, maintaining a sense of continuity with Frozen. Abraham emphasized the systematic approach not to force the narrative but to let Olaf's character naturally guide them to different locations and events. In addition, they placed various Easter eggs in the short film, including details in Anna's coronation dress and shots from other Disney animated films.

== Release ==
Once Upon a Snowman was teased during Disney's virtual Frozen Fest event on October 18, 2020 before it was released exclusively on the streaming service Disney+ on October 23, 2020.

== Reception ==
=== Critical response ===
Ryan Britt from Fatherly praised "Once Upon a Snowman" as a refreshing Christmas short, highlighting its unexpected amusement for its duration, while Drew Taylor of Collider gave it an A rating, appreciating the entertaining humor, Josh Gad's portrayal of Olaf, and the appealing animation. Emily Ashby of Common Sense Media rated the short film 5 out of 5 stars, lauding its depiction of curiosity and self-discovery in Olaf and the portrayal of optimism and perseverance. W. Andrew Powell of TheGATE.ca rated it 4 out of 5 stars, acknowledging Gad's excellent portrayal and humor in the narrative but suggesting it could have been longer. Matt Fowler of IGN gave it a 6 out of 10, praising Gad's performance and the story but feeling it lacked substantial addition to the Frozen franchise.

=== Accolades ===
The short film was nominated for Outstanding Short Form Animated Program at the 73rd Primetime Emmy Awards.
