= For the First Time in Forever =

Song from the film Frozen

Song by Kristen Bell and Idina Menzel

from the album Frozen
- Published: Wonderland Music Company
- Released: November 25, 2013
- Recorded: 2013
- Genre: Show tune
- Length: 3:46
- Label: Walt Disney
- Songwriters: Kristen Anderson-Lopez; Robert Lopez
- Producers: Kristen Anderson-Lopez; Robert Lopez; Christophe Beck; Chris Montan; Tom MacDougall

"For the First Time in Forever" is a song from Disney's 2013 animated feature film Frozen, with music and lyrics composed by Kristen Anderson-Lopez and Robert Lopez. It is reprised later in the musical. Both versions are sung by American actresses Kristen Bell and Idina Menzel, who provide the speaking and the singing voices of Princess Anna and Queen Elsa, respectively. It reached the top 20 in Japan and South Korea.

== Production ==
The song was composed relatively late in the production process in June 2013. This was only five months before the film's November 27, 2013 release date, when the filmmakers were scrambling to make the film work after being dissatisfied with the state of the film in February.

The original version of the song contained a line about "I hope that I don't vomit in his face," which was deemed unacceptable by Disney as a reference to bodily fluids. The Lopezes' daughter, Katie, came up with the replacement line that ended up in the film: "I wanna stuff some chocolate in my face."

As for the reprise, there was originally a different confrontation lyric for the scene where Elsa strikes Anna with her powers entitled "Life's Too Short" (the premise being that life is too short to waste it with someone who doesn't understand them), which itself would have been reprised later when the sisters realize that life's too short to live life alone. As the characters evolved throughout the writing process (specifically Elsa was turned from a villain to a tragic hero), the song was deemed too vindictive and was instead replaced with a reprise of this song, to create a motif. "Life's Too Short" survives as a demo track on the Deluxe Edition of the movie soundtrack, and part of the melody was reused in Frozen Fever for the song "Making Today A Perfect Day".

When the necessity of a reprise dawned upon Anderson-Lopez, she wrote it in only about 20 minutes, and then successfully pitched it on her own to the Disney production team, as Lopez was already with the team in Los Angeles trying to fix "Do You Want to Build a Snowman?"

== Synopsis ==
=== Original ===
Elsa sings a solemn and frightened counterpoint melody to Anna's bright and cheery song of anticipation. This dynamic is reprised later in the film when Anna confronts Elsa in her ice tower.

In the first version, the song shows Anna's happiness and naive optimism when preparing for Elsa's coronation. During the third verse, Elsa sings a counterpoint melody (with some of the same lyrics that are later used as the first verse of "Let it Go"), in which she expresses her fear of accidentally revealing her ice powers and her anxiety about opening the gates. During her solo, Elsa practices her role in the coronation on a box and candlestick in her room. Elsa orders the guards to open the gates, and Anna joyfully wanders down a causeway into the town against the flow of guests arriving. The song is cut off mid-note when Anna crashes into Hans's horse, and subsequently falls into a rowboat. This version goes up a half-step with each verse, starting in F major and ending in G major for the final chorus.

==== Musical ====
In the Broadway musical version of the song, a pair of lines in the first verse are changed due to staging limitations. Anna's line "Who knew we had eight thousand salad plates" is changed to "And there's two nice ladies helping me get dressed," and the line it rhymes with, "Finally they're opening up the gates!" is changed to "Coronation day is just the best!" In addition, after the last key change, there is an additional verse sung by a chorus of townspeople. Anna's run-in with Hans also involves them falling into Kristoff's ice-cart, rather than a rowboat.

==== Frozen Jr. ====
In the Frozen Jr. version, the first verse uses the same lyrics as the original, barring one small line change in the second verse, where "A beautiful stranger, tall and fair" is changed to "A beautiful stranger, tall and rare". The fourth verse originally added by the full musical was also omitted. This version goes up a half-step from the first to second verse and a whole step from the second to third verse, progressing from E flat major to E major, ending in F major for the final. In addition, Elsa's solo bridge in the second verse uses the relative minor of E major - C# minor.

==== Frozen Kids ====
In the Frozen Kids version, the song was further shortened, with the second verse being omitted.

=== Reprise ===
In the reprise, Anna arrives at Elsa's ice palace to try to get her to unfreeze the kingdom, after she unknowingly sparked an eternal winter. She also wants Elsa to come back so that they can rekindle their once close relationship as sisters. However, Elsa refuses because she feels she cannot control her powers and that she is better off alone where she can't hurt anyone. As Anna tries to reason with her sister, Elsa's fear intensifies, resulting in her being covered in a blizzard of ice particles as a physical manifestation of her emotions, and she blocks out Anna's calming words. At one point, Elsa turns her back to her sister to form a two shot west, a blocking technique normally used in American soap operas. Finally, paranoid and lost, Elsa lets out a yell, and accidentally blasts Anna in the heart with the accumulated ice particles, thereby freezing it (an act which Pabbie and the trolls note to be fatal); causing her to fall to the floor and Kristoff and Olaf to rush to her side, to make sure she is okay.

The reprise uses a different melody from the original. Namely, Anna's parts are in a major key while Elsa's counterpoint is in a minor key, highlighting the opposite emotions the two characters have at this point in time. After Anna is inadvertently struck by Elsa's magic, the percussion includes part of the music from "Frozen Heart".

==== Musical version ====
In the reprise, Elsa tells Anna about how she hurt her with her magic when they were kids, and sings the bridge verse from Demi Lovato's version of "Let It Go", albeit with slightly modified lyrics to reflect Elsa's character, before the reprise starts.

Later after the North American tour in 2019, the reprise was replaced with a new duet titled "I Can't Lose You", which was eventually added to subsequent productions of the musical, while the "Let it Go" stanza remains unchanged.

== International versions ==
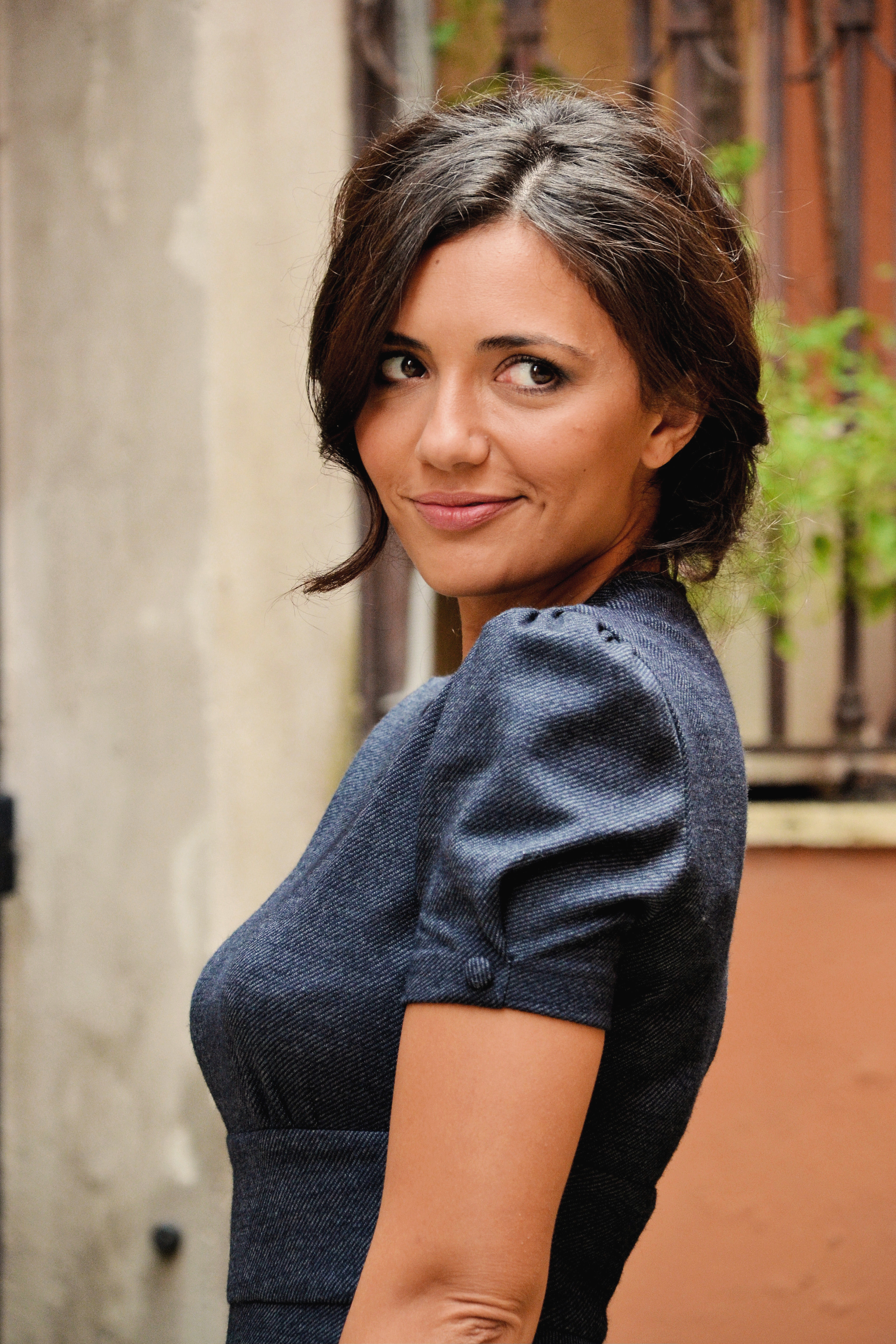
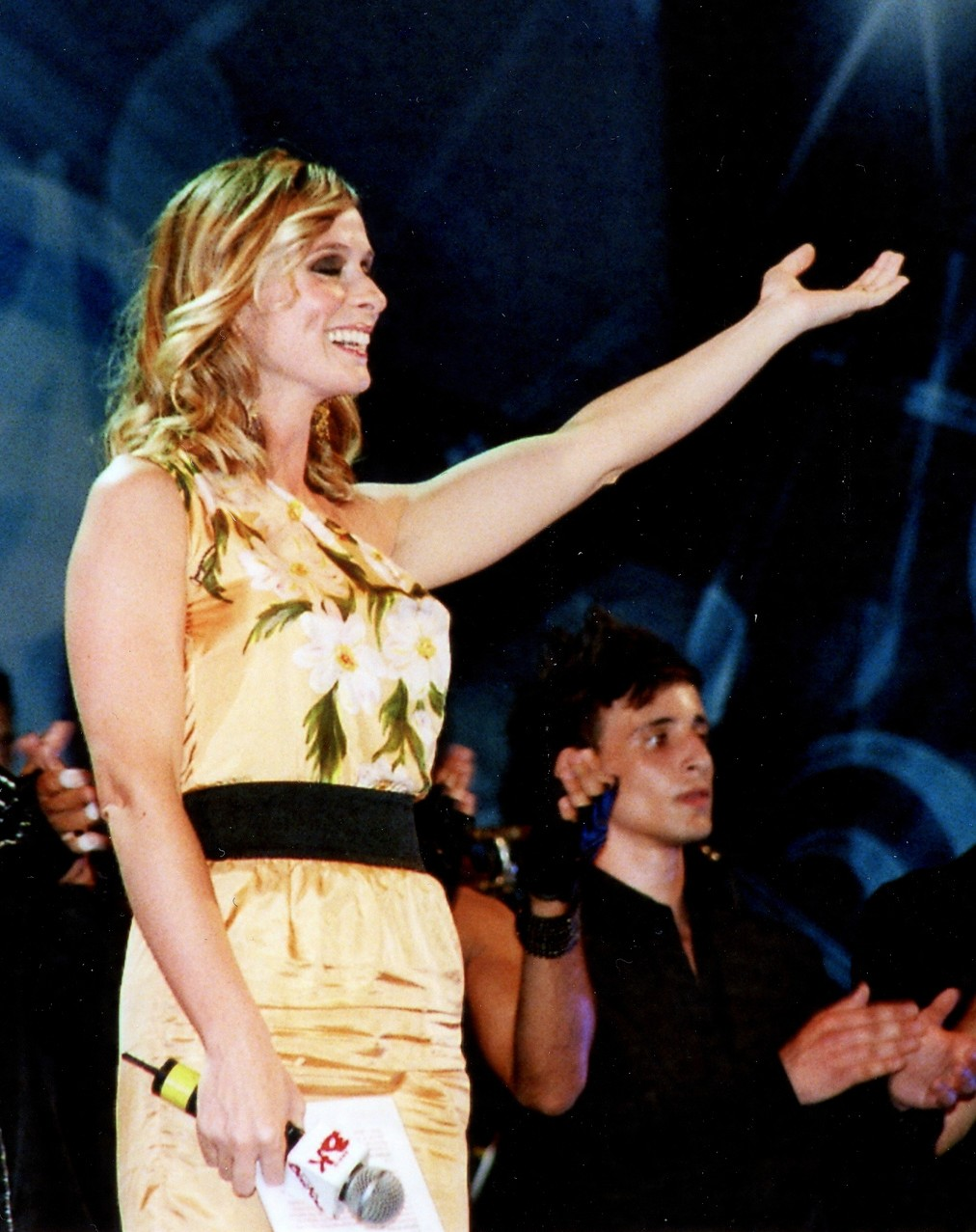
Italian actresses and singers Serena Rossi and Serena Autieri and the Italian cast of Frozen were awarded the best foreign dubbing worldwide

Several other language versions of the song have been successful. The Japanese-language version called "Umarete Hajimete" (生まれてはじめて; "For the first time in life") was sung by Takako Matsu and Sayaka Kanda, who played Elsa and Anna respectively. It appeared on the Billboard Japan Hot 100 in between April and June 2014, peaking at number 19, and was popular enough to be certified platinum for 250,000 digital downloads by the RIAJ in September 2014. The Korean-language version, sung by Park Ji-Yun and Park Hyena, reached 129 on the Gaon Singles Chart being downloaded 14,000 times, while the reprise version peaked at 192 with 8,000 downloads. The Italian version, along with the whole Italian adaptation of the movie, was awarded the best foreign dubbing worldwide by Disney.

== Charts ==
Chart (2013–14)	Peak position
Australia (ARIA)	62
Canada Hot 100 (Billboard)	70
Ireland (IRMA)	54
Japan (Billboard Japan Hot 100)	14
Scotland Singles (OCC)	37
South Korea (Gaon International Chart)	4
South Korea (Gaon Chart)	19
Sweden Heatseeker (Sverigetopplistan) "För första gången nånsin" by Annika Herlitz and Mimmi Sandén	19
UK Singles (OCC)	38
US Billboard Hot 100	57

== Critical reception ==
Anna picks up three ducklings while singing the original version of the song.

Both iterations have received very positive reviews. NeonTommy described it as "A classic "I Want" song (think Part of Your World or When Will My Life Begin?) with a sprinkle of self-awareness", and said "this song puts a nice new spin on a familiar form...Lopez and Anderson-Lopez keep the tune fresh, and Kristen Bell's charming and bright delivery of the peppy lyrics is endearing." GeeksOfDoom said "Who would have guessed that Kristen Bell and Idina Menzel would make such a nice duo? Bell adds some humor with her effervescent spirit and amusing lyrics, whereas Menzel lends the signature Broadway voice. You know a song provides further significance when it moves the story, as opposed to stops the film completely, and this one perfectly represents the former. "First Time" conveys Anna's hopefulness and openness, contrasting with Elsa's close-minded and fearful vibe." In a negative review, SputnikMusic said ""For the First Time in Forever," with its lyrical clunkers like "Don't know if I'm elated or gassy / But I'm somewhere in that zone" and poor performance decisions like the ham-fisted pause before Elsa "opens the gates" and Anna's meaningless harmonization shortly thereafter, represents the downhill slide and subsequent face-first mud landing of the soundtrack over the course of its runtime". The Hollywood Reporter described it as a "big number", and "the centerpiece of the original songs". StitchKingdom said: "The 'I Want' song, the composition and lyrics feed off Anna's frenetic and anxious energy and awkwardness, a classic example of mixing sophistication with silliness". Rochester City Newspaper wrote "For the First Time in Forever suffers from a fairly run-of-the-mill chorus tune, but smartly makes up for it with catchy verses, amusing lyrics ("Don't know if I'm elated or gassy / But I'm somewhere in that zone!") and a great performance from Kristen Bell, showing off protagonist Princess Anna's quirky side while still longing for a ball, a man, and some basic human interaction."

=== Reprise ===
"For the First Time in Forever (Reprise)"

Song by Kristen Bell & Idina Menzel

from the album Frozen
- Published: Wonderland Music Company
- Released: November 25, 2013
- Recorded: 2013
- Genre: Show tune
- Length: 2:30
- Label: Walt Disney
- Songwriters: Kristen Anderson-Lopez; Robert Lopez
- Producers: Kristen Anderson-Lopez; Robert Lopez; Christophe Beck; Chris Montan; Tom MacDougall

NeonTommy wrote, "This song balances really well between long, powerful phrases and banter-like recitative, and is a great illustration of the dynamic between Anna and Elsa. It's also the first time where we get to hear Anna and Elsa sing as equals (the earlier version of this song is more about Anna than it is about Elsa), so it's quite fun to hear this song between two sisters." GeeksOfDoom wrote "The reoccurrence of the "sister song" signifies how Elsa has changed, much unlike Anna, who still sees the potential of their relationship. The song incorporates polyphony and intensifies their emotions as it builds to a crescendo. While it's not a substantial addition – the scene could have played out just as well without music – it's still entertaining". StitchKingdom wrote, "The words and melody are just about the only thing this song has in common with its namesake. Anna's desperate plea to Elsa, this song also features one of the most complex arrangements found on the soundtrack, giving it a haunting and to a professional effect in a way seldom seen on the stage, let alone in family films. The song also treads dangerously along the operetta line at times which puts a unique spin on it."

=== Certifications ===
Region	Certification	Certified units/sales
Australia (ARIA)	Gold	35,000^{^}
United Kingdom (BPI)	2× Platinum	1,200,000^{‡}
United States (RIAA)	4× Platinum	4,000,000^{‡}
^{^} Shipments figures based on certification alone.^{‡} Sales+streaming figures based on certification alone.

== Performances ==
Kristen Bell and Idina Menzel performed both songs together at the Vibrato Grill Jazz Club in Los Angeles to celebrate the film. During the first ever Rose Parade Halftime performance, the North American tour cast of the Broadway show performed the first rendition, with Anna interacting with the spectators.
