= Olaf (Frozen) =

Fictional character from the Frozen franchise

- Frozen character
- First appearance: Frozen (2013)
- Created by: Chris Buck; Jennifer Lee; Hyrum Osmond; Mark Henn; Trent Correy; Bert Klein
- Designed by: Bill Schwab
- Voiced by: Josh Gad; Jake Green (Disney Dreamlight Valley and Disney Speedstorm)

In-universe information
- Species: Snowman
- Gender: Male
- Family: Marshmallow (brother); Snowgies (brothers)
- Origin: Arendelle
- Nationality: Arendellian
- Creator: Elsa; Anna (Note: Elsa brought Olaf to life through her magic, while Anna helped build him as children.)

Olaf is a fictional character in Disney's Frozen franchise. He first appeared in Walt Disney Animation Studios' animated film Frozen (2013). He later appears in other related Frozen media, including the sequel Frozen 2 (2019), and serves as the central character in the featurette Olaf's Frozen Adventure (2017), the short film Once Upon a Snowman (2020), and the series of shorts Olaf Presents (2021). In the Frozen filmography he is voiced by Josh Gad.

At the beginning of Frozen, Olaf is an inanimate snowman created by Elsa and Anna in their childhood. He then reappears in the film as an anthropomorphic snowman created by Elsa's ice powers, and helps Anna and Kristoff in their journey to find Elsa.

Olaf is an optimistic character; he is obsessed with summer and heat and loves "warm hugs". Originally designed as one of Elsa's henchmen, Olaf's character was rewritten in the final version of Frozen as a sweet character that represents the innocent love between the two sisters. With his ability to break his body apart and childlike personality, Olaf provides much of the comic relief in the franchise.

Critics have been polarised by the character, with some finding Olaf adorable while others describe him as annoying. He quickly emerged as a fan-favourite character, making him one of the breakout characters of the franchise. For voicing Olaf, Gad was recognized with two Annie Award wins in 2014 and 2020.

== Development ==
=== Origins and concept ===
The Disney studio made their first attempts to adapt Hans Christian Andersen's fairytale, "The Snow Queen", as early as 1943, when Walt Disney considered the possibility of producing a biography film of the author. However, the story and the characters proved to be too symbolic to translate into film. Later on, other Disney executives had made efforts to translate this material to the big screen, however these proposals were all shelved due to similar issues.

In 2008, Chris Buck pitched Disney his version of the story called Anna and the Snow Queen, which was planned to be traditionally animated. This version was "completely different" from Frozen; it had a storyline that stuck much closer to the original material and featured an entirely different Olaf character. However, by early 2010, the project was scrapped again. On December 22, 2011, Disney announced a new title for the film, Frozen, which would be released on November 27, 2013, and a different crew from the previous attempt. The new script, which employed "the same concept but was completely rewritten", finally solved the long-term problem with Andersen's story by depicting Anna and Elsa as sisters.

In early versions of the film, Olaf was written as the first of a legion of snowman guards that Elsa created at her castle. Buck likened Olaf to a pancake that Elsa had created while learning her powers before throwing away. Jennifer Lee said that Olaf's odd shape came from thinking about the imperfect shapes that children make out of snow when building a snowman. Once Josh Gad was on board, the creative team realised that Olaf's part as a henchman in the film was not working and spent two weeks discussing how to integrate the character into the plot. With the aim of giving him more fun and making him a part of Elsa and Anna's childhood, they arrived at the idea that he loves summer and this was an ideal way to emphasise the theme of innocence. This concept was then developed into the song "In Summer", which was written by the songwriting team Robert Lopez and Kristen Anderson-Lopez for Gad's vocals to illustrate Olaf's naivety.

The core element of the story was the love between the sisters. As children the girls build a snowman that represents the love between them. This became the core concept for Olaf. Lee said that the character began to take shape once the team had established what he meant to the girls. Lee explained that Olaf represents an innocent form of love. When Elsa sings "Let It Go" she recalls her last happy moment when she and Anna created Olaf in childhood. Thus, Olaf is imbued with that innocent love and some characteristics of Anna as she was as a child. Olaf also provides a significant amount of comic relief in the film, which Lee described as a "kids-state-the-obvious kind of way".

=== Voice ===
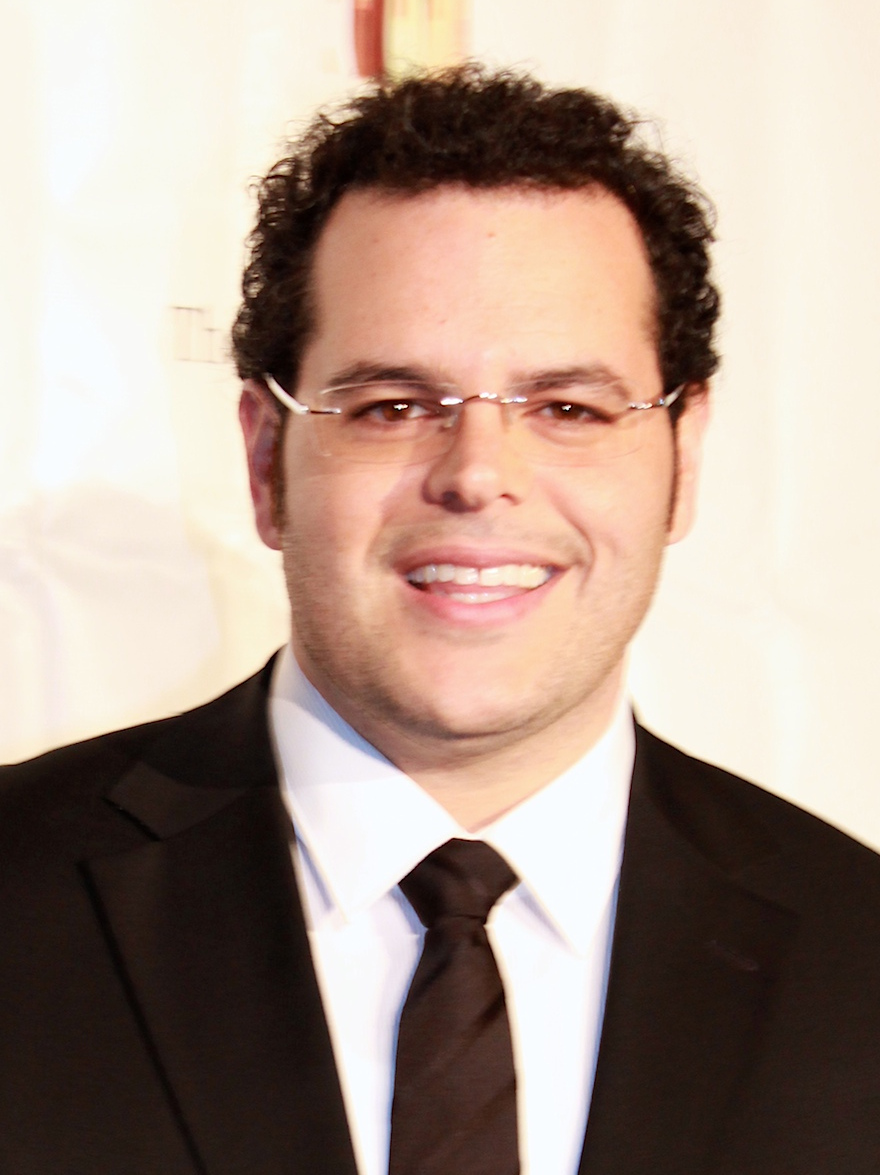
Josh Gad is the voice of Olaf in the Frozen filmography.

Josh Gad, a Tony-nominated actor known for his performance as Elder Cunningham in Broadway's The Book of Mormon, was cast to voice Olaf. His casting was announced on June 18, 2013. Having been involved in reading for the part of Olaf when the project was titled Anna and the Snow Queen, Gad was disappointed when it failed to be greenlit. He moved onto other projects and almost lost out to the role due to being involved in another upcoming project for DreamWorks Animation titled Me and My Shadow. When Walt Disney Animation attempted the Snow Queen project again, Robert Lopez and Kristen Anderson-Lopez joined the production and began campaigning for Gad to return to the cast. Gad was released from his obligation to DreamWorks when its project failed due to story complications, which meant that he was free to rejoin the cast of Frozen.

According to Lee, Gad saved Olaf from being cut from the film entirely. Having joined the project after it was in development, Lee's initial reaction was "Kill the snowman". This decision changed when an animator offered changes to the script with Gad in mind, which led Lee to cast him in the role.

To prepare for voicing the character, Gad said that he had to find his "inner child" because Olaf is defined by his innocence. Having been created by the two sisters in childhood, he remains a child, even after the sisters grow up. Gad said that he was brought in by Lee and Buck to do a test where they played around with the character and that test ended up being Olaf's first scene in the film. In the early versions of the character, Olaf had a lisp but Gad thought this unnecessary in the final version. During the recording sessions, Gad recorded Olaf's lines in isolation from the other actors. Gad improvised some of the dialogue, but his screen time was limited to ensure that the character did not take over the story. Lee said that Olaf was not fully realised until Gad became involved, and through working with him they found the character's voice and personality. Gad's studio performance was videotaped, and the animators used his facial expressions and physical moves as a reference for animating the character.

Gad later expressed that getting a part in a Disney film was a dream for him, due to being a fan of Disney films in his childhood. "I grew up during the second golden age of Disney animation, when every movie that came out was an event – The Little Mermaid, Beauty and the Beast, Aladdin, The Lion King," he said. Impressed by the performances of comedic relief sidekicks such as Timon and Pumbaa in The Lion King, or the Genie in Aladdin, Gad set the goal of playing characters of this type at an early age. Gad based his performance on his The Book of Mormon co-star Rory O'Malley. In September 2024, Gad expressed regret at having created a voice for Olaf that sounded too similar to his own, due to being too often recognised in public by his voice.

=== Design ===
"With Olaf, simplicity is key. We don't want him to feel like a stretchy bouncy all-over-the-place character. He's a snowman; we can pull him apart and put him together. But we want to keep it simple. To me, Olaf, is my five-year-old-boy at home: loving and trusting and pure and very naive."

— Hyrum Osmond, supervising animator

Early in development, the creative team realised that they could have fun with Olaf's ability to come apart. The animation team made several versions of the character using test animations before reaching Olaf's final design. Buck described Olaf as a "giant toy box" because the animators could play around with his parts, such as moving the position of his three snowballs, his eyes, nose and stick arms. Lee said he was finalised once they started approaching the question of how a snowman thinks. Due to lack of time, head of animation Lino DiSalvo drew 2D images of Olaf's key poses by hand and then matched them in computer graphics.

Hyrum Osmond, an animation supervisor who served as the character lead for Olaf, described him as an "animator's dream" as he was the one character that the animators could have fun experimenting with. Having never animated a snowman before, the animation team tested the capabilities of the character in ways that could not be done with animal or human characters. Jeff Ranjo commented that Olaf feels no pain, so the animators could "torture" him by ripping off his arms or cutting his head off. DiSalvo said that initially they made the character too flexible so that he ended up appearing too rubbery, but then decided to use his stick arms as a way to limit his flexibility. They could then make him remove his head to look at something or remove an arm to reach in order to add extra entertainment value. In addition to his design, the creative team had to solve the problem of making Olaf stand out against the snowy landscape. They made subtle differences to his texture and to the lighting to make him clearly visible without making him look like a cut out.

=== Characterisation ===
Olaf is an anthropomorphic snowman brought to life by Queen Elsa. His attitude to life is eternally optimistic and he enjoys getting "warm hugs". He is also obsessed with summer, despite not knowing what it is like or understanding how dangerous it is for a snowman. While singing "In Summer", he imagines being in various summer settings, such as bouncing through meadows or sunbathing. Due to the song's scenes taking place within the confines of his imagination, lead editor Jeff Draheim said that it was an ideal way to break reality by putting Olaf in different locations, such as in a pool of water or on a beach. Many of the elements in the background were shaped like Olaf to mimic his character.

Speaking of Olaf's personality, Gad expressed enthusiasm for the character's qualities, stating that his naivety gave Gad scope to experiment with voicing him in a way that would not be possible with a straight character. He said that Olaf has "the biggest heart in the world" despite not having a heart and "lives to love". Story artist Jeff Ranjo likened Olaf to a baby because in the film he has just been created and needs other characters to explain the world around him.

Olaf's death was the first scene that Gad recorded upon returning to voice the character in the sequel Frozen 2. The screenplay involved a scene in which Olaf flurries away in the wind when Elsa loses her powers. Following screenings with test audiences, the creative team realised that children reacted to the death scene with confusion and sadness. Gad stated that it was Olaf's naivety that left the younger audience feeling scared for him, quoting Bob Iger who opined that because Olaf is a child, the children would see themselves in the character. The scene was changed to illustrate that when Olaf flurries away, he is at peace rather than feeling scared, before being revived by Elsa.

Olaf's character arc in Frozen 2 centres around his maturation, for which Gad took inspiration from his five-year-old daughter who had asked him what would happen if she did not want to grow up. When Gad approached Buck and Lee with this idea, they agreed that Olaf needed to grow up. Gad noted that in the first film Olaf was newly created and therefore had a new perspective on life like a toddler. His song "In Summer", was intended to be a humorous illustration of his naivety. The creative team discussed how to find the right level of maturity for Olaf in the sequel, which was eventually expressed in his more complex speech. A short song titled "Unmeltable Me" was recorded by Gad but abandoned by the final cut. Olaf's maturation was eventually expressed in "When I Am Older", a humorous song that was recorded six months into development in which he believes everything will be better understood when he is older. Lee said that Olaf's comedy in Frozen 2 was underlined by his existential crisis, which she felt was a fundamental part of growing up.

"Olaf has this overwhelming optimism and sincerity about him. And that just never gets old. It's something that we all sort of aspire to and sometimes fall short. But Olaf is always there charging ahead with just this eternal optimism and sweetness that I think is a part of all of us, but maybe we wish we had more of."

— Dan Abraham, co-director

For the animated short Once Upon a Snowman, the creative team wanted to revisit the events of the first Frozen film to create a backstory for Olaf that would take place in the moments leading to his first meeting with Anna, Kristoff and Sven. With the aim of including new information for some unanswered questions about the character, they watched Frozen repeatedly to gather ideas. Co-director Dan Abraham focused on the question of why Olaf has an obsession with summer, particularly as he expresses his love for heat and sun immediately after his entrance. This was resolved in a scene in which Olaf enters Oaken's shop and views several cards of summer scenes while looking through a stereoscope. Co-director Trent Correy said that some early ideas were abandoned, such as Olaf having a fish as a nose for the majority of the short, a humorous idea that was eventually cut down to just a few seconds. In addition to showing Olaf's first steps, which they called his "Bambi moment", the directors also showed him attempting to understand who he is. He realises that he is made of snow and also learns kindness and gives his sausage nose to a hungry wolf. Abraham said that it is "Olaf’s ability to always make that choice of putting others before him that makes him who he is".

== Appearances ==
=== Frozen filmography ===
==== Frozen ====
While playing together in childhood, Anna and Elsa build a snowman and name him Olaf. Later, after Elsa exposes her powers at her coronation party and flees Arendelle, he is recreated and brought to life by her powers as she is singing "Let It Go". Anna decides to find Elsa and after meeting Kristoff and Sven, they cross paths with Olaf while traveling up the North Mountain. Anna's first instinct is to give Olaf a carrot nose. Before they continue on their way, Olaf sings "In Summer", in which he fantasizes about what it might be like to experience summer heat, unaware that he will melt. Olaf then guides Anna, Kristoff and Sven to Elsa's ice palace.

After they are expelled by Elsa's snowman Marshmallow, Olaf accompanies Anna and Kristoff to the trolls who raised Kristoff to seek help to remove the ice in Anna's heart that was accidentally put there by her sister. The trolls try to marry Anna and Kristoff while singing "Fixer Upper" and Olaf also joins in the sequence.

The group thinks a "True Love's Kiss" can save Anna, and so they head back to Arendelle. Olaf gets separated from the group on the way but reunites with Anna after Hans betrays her and locks her in a room. After warming her up, Olaf comforts Anna, telling her the real meaning of love. After realizing that Kristoff loves Anna, he sees him returning to them, so they head out to the fjord to find Kristoff, but Olaf is blown away. When he finally finds his friends, he is shocked and saddened to see that Anna has been completely frozen but relieved when she thaws. He is the first to realize that Anna's sacrifice to save Elsa was the act of true love she needed to break the spell.

After Elsa dissipates the eternal winter and reestablishes herself as queen, she creates a snow cloud for Olaf so that he can fulfill his dream of experiencing summer without melting. He then smells a flower and sneezes his carrot nose directly into Sven's mouth, but Sven returns it to him. Later, he joins Anna and Elsa on an improvised skating rink in the castle courtyard.

==== Frozen Fever ====
Olaf appears in the short film Frozen Fever where he is caught stuffing a piece of cake into his mouth by Elsa. When Elsa is not paying any attention, Olaf quickly spits it back onto the cake where he ate from. Then, he is found helping Kristoff and Sven trying to get rid of the snowgies that are being produced every time Elsa sneezes. At the end of the special, he is seen helping Kristoff and Sven escort the snowgies to live with Marshmallow at the ice palace on the North Mountain.

==== Olaf's Frozen Adventure ====
Olaf stars in a 21-minute Frozen holiday film along with Anna, Elsa, Kristoff, and Sven, which debuted in theaters for a limited time engagement with Disney·Pixar's Coco on November 22, 2017. It made its television debut on ABC on December 14, 2017.

When Christmas arrives in Arendelle, Anna and Elsa plan a surprise party for their subjects. Olaf is particularly excited to start the festivities, but when it comes time for the party to begin, all the guests leave after the annual ringing of the Yule bell in the castle courtyard. Anna and Elsa come to realize that their isolation had robbed them of any holiday traditions of their own, which Elsa feels guilty for. Olaf, however, enlists Sven to journey throughout Arendelle and learn from the populace of all the traditions the season has to offer. Once enough information is gathered (including melting and then reforming in Oaken's sauna), Olaf makes his way back to the castle, though a mishap with overloading Kristoff's sled separates the two, and destroys the sled and all the holiday-related keepsakes in the process. With only a fruitcake, Olaf journeys into the woods, and is attacked by vicious wolves while traversing through. He narrowly escapes them, but loses the fruitcake shortly thereafter to a hawk.

Depressed at having failed Anna and Elsa, Olaf wanders into the night, depressed, and figures it would be best to remain lost. Meanwhile, Sven informs Kristoff, Anna, and Elsa of Olaf's encounter with the wolves, and a search party is organized to find the missing snowman. After much searching, the royal sisters come across the downhearted Olaf, who apologizes for failing in his mission. Anna and Elsa reveal that they managed to find a tradition on their own: Olaf. It is revealed that during the years that they were separated, Anna would create drawings of Olaf (and on one occasion, a doll), and slide them under Elsa's door each Christmas as a reminder of their childhood and the love they have for each other. The sisters then lead Olaf and their subjects onto a frozen lake beneath the northern lights to host a holiday party and create a giant Christmas tree made of ice.

==== Frozen 2 ====
Olaf is featured in the sequel to Frozen, Frozen 2; released on November 22, 2019, in the US. In this film, it is revealed that Olaf no longer needs his personal flurry and now has a layer of permafrost that keeps him from melting. While running from Arendelle, Olaf starts to blow but Kristoff saves him from being blown away. He was seen playing with the children as they were decorating some ice crystals.

When Elsa gets frozen knowing the truth about the past, Olaf disintegrates once Elsa's power is gone. After Anna has the dam destroyed, and Elsa is saved by her action, Elsa rebuilds Olaf.

==== Once Upon a Snowman ====
Once Upon a Snowman tells Olaf's story after he is created by Elsa and before he meets Anna and Kristoff. It explains why Olaf likes summer and how he remembers his name.

==== Olaf Presents ====
Inspired by a scene in Frozen 2 in which Olaf recaps the entirety of the first film in 90 seconds, Olaf Presents has Olaf recapping several popular Disney films in that same vein. He recaps The Little Mermaid, Aladdin, The Lion King, Tangled, and Moana.

=== Other appearances in animation ===
Olaf made an appearance in an episode of the television series Sofia the First titled "The Secret Library: Olaf and the Tale of Miss Nettle", the second episode of a four-part story arc, which premiered February 15, 2016 on Disney Channel and Disney Jr.. He is once again voiced by Josh Gad.

A series of short animated episodes titled At Home With Olaf was released exclusively on the official Disney Animation YouTube channel from April 6, 2020. Featuring the voice of Gad, it presents Olaf in a variety of adventures. Osmond conceived the series alone and developed it with a team of animators and Gad all working from home during the COVID-19 pandemic. In May 2020, Disney also released the song "I Am With You", with vocals by Gad as Olaf and score written by the Lopez team.

He is one of the several Walt Disney Animation Studios characters that appear in the short film Once Upon a Studio. While humming the song "Friend Like Me" and drawing the Genie from Aladdin, he is surprised when the Genie jumps out of the drawing. Returning as the voice of Olaf, Gad expressed delight at appearing in the same scene as the character that inspired him to voice a Disney character.

=== Stage ===
Olaf appeared as a puppet in the stage production of Frozen, A Musical Spectacular, which opened exclusively on Disney Cruise Line's Disney Wonder on 10 November 2016. In the Broadway musical Frozen, which opened on March 22, 2018, Olaf appeared as a puppet controlled by actor Greg Hildreth. In February 2019, Ryann Redmond was cast as the first female actor in the role of Olaf on Broadway. In the North American tour of the musical, the role was played by F. Michael Haynie. In 2021, the musical opened at Theatre Royal, Drury Lane in the West End with Craig Gallivan in the role of Olaf.

=== Video games ===
Olaf is the protagonist of the video game Frozen: Olaf's Quest. The video game Disney Infinity 3.0 includes Olaf as a playable characters, like other characters in the game being launched a figurine of him to be linked to the game. Olaf is a playable character to unlock for a limited time in the video game Disney Magic Kingdoms. He is a secondary character in Kingdom Hearts III, where he appears in the world of Arendelle, having the same role as in Frozen. The game also features a mini game in which the protagonist, Sora, must find the parts of Olaf's body. Josh Gad reprises his role in the English dub of the game, while in the original Japanese version he was initially voiced by Pierre Taki, later being reddubed by Shunsuke Takeuchi in an update patch. Olaf is one of the villagers in the game Disney Dreamlight Valley, where he is voiced by Jake Green. An alternate version of Olaf appears as a playable character in the video game Disney Mirrorverse. An update to the match three game Frozen Free Fall introduced Olaf in February 2014.

=== Theme parks and events ===
At Disneyland, there was a talking audio-animatronic Olaf sitting on top the roof of the cottage that was home to the Anna and Elsa meet-and-greet. From July 5 to September 1, 2014, as part of 'Frozen' Summer Fun show at Disney's Hollywood Studios, Olaf appeared in Olaf on Summer Vacation section. He also appeared in "Frozen" Fireworks Spectacular alongside Anna, Elsa and Kristoff, a fireworks display set to the music of Frozen. Anna, Elsa, Kristoff, and Olaf made appearances in Mickey’s Once Upon a Christmastime Parade, offered during Mickey’s Very Merry Christmas Party at Magic Kingdom in November and December 2014. From January 7, 2015, Olaf began making meet and greet appearances in Disney California Adventure at "Olaf's Snow Fest" and visitors could learn how to draw Olaf at the Disney Animation Building's Animation Academy as part of the park's "Frozen Fun" event. Beginning May 22, 2015, Disneyland debuted a new nighttime parade called "Paint the Night", which included a Frozen float featuring Anna, Elsa, and Olaf, as part of the park's 60th anniversary celebration. Olaf appears as an audio-animatronic in the dark ride Frozen Ever After, which opened in Epcot on June 21, 2016. In World of Frozen at Hong Kong Disneyland, Olaf appears along with the other characters in the Frozen Ever After boat ride.

Olaf balloon being inflated before the 2018 Macy's Thanksgiving Day Parade

A giant balloon of the character debuted in the 91st Macy's Thanksgiving Day Parade in 2017. The balloon's design was inspired by a sketch of Olaf drawn by Buck. The Olaf balloon also appeared in the parade in 2018 and 2019.

In November 2025, Disney announced that an animatronic figure of Olaf with the ability to walk, talk and interact with visitors would make appearances at Disneyland Paris and Hong Kong Disneyland in 2026. The Imagineering team used artificial intelligence to give Olaf an ability to learn various movements.

== Reception and legacy ==
Despite being a supporting character in the franchise, Olaf emerged as a fan favourite, resulting in specials and short spin-offs centred on the character. The creative team attributed his popularity to his humour and purity, in addition to his character growth. Digital Spy cited Olaf as one of the breakout characters of Frozen.

David Crow of Den of Geek described Olaf as a "cute little sidekick" and felt that the character was loaded with "earnest sincerity". While finding fault with the other leading characters, Scott Foundas writing for Variety found Olaf to be the only "unimpeachable" character and thought that he deserved a spin off feature. In an IGN review of the film, Chris Carle described Gad's performance as "consistently hilarious" and praised his "perfectly timed" voice work and Olaf's "show-stopping" song. Christy Lemire writing for RogerEbert.com found Gad's Olaf to be "lovably goofy". Writing for the Tampa Bay Times, Steve Persall likened him to Tow Mater for being the "adorably dumb sidekick" and enjoyed the continuous visual comedy of his detachable body parts. Betsy Sharkey, Los Angeles Times film critic, considered Olaf's ability to come apart to be an "animation marvel" and thought him endearing.

Slate's Dan Koi enjoyed Olaf's comical movements but complained that he had no impact on the plot and felt he was added in just for jokes and slapstick comedy. He further criticised the Frozen trailer for misleading children into believing it was a film about a snowman and a reindeer fighting for a carrot. Matt Singer of ScreenCrush initially hated Olaf but years later admitted to gaining an appreciation for the character, particularly the innocence of Gad's vocals and the physical comedy involving Olaf's disconnected body parts.

The placement of Olaf's Frozen Adventure before the theatrical release of Pixar's Coco in November 2017 resulted in media reports that it was strongly disliked by the viewing public due to its 21-minute length. Alissa Wilkinson of Vox described the plot, which follows Olaf searching for holiday traditions, as "grating and occasionally charming", but felt that Coco was a strong enough film to stand alone. Emma Stefansky of Vanity Fair commented that while Olaf's scenes in Frozen were limited enough to avoid him becoming irritating, Olaf's Frozen Adventure gave him much more screen time, which she thought was "way too much". Tom Butler of Yahoo! Entertainment defended the short, reporting that children were captivated by Olaf's character.

Tim Grierson wrote in a review of Frozen 2 for ScreenDaily that he quickly got tired of Olaf's function of being the film's comic relief. Lauryl Fischer wrote an article in defence of Olaf for Polygon, noting that critical reaction to the character was polarised due to his lovable but annoying personality. For his part in Frozen 2, Olaf was praised by Fischer for exploring difficult topics like loss and death with a young audience. Jonathan Heaf of GQ felt it was a heartbreaking moment and a "brave choice" for Disney to kill a principal character.

For Olaf Presents, Gad received praise for his vocal range when Olaf impersonates various Disney animated characters. BJ Colangelo of SlashFilm described it as "masterful", particularly for giving the impression that it is Olaf himself doing the impersonations. Drew Taylor also expressed his appreciation of Gad's performance in TheWrap by saying that Olaf deserved more credit. He thought that criticism towards the character was not his fault and through his "iconoclastic references and wacky humor" he helps to positively disrupt the storytelling in the franchise.

On 9 December 2014, Russian cosmonaut Anton Shkaplerov posted a photo on Twitter of a stuffed Olaf toy from the observation deck of the International Space Station. In 2015, Taylor Swift dressed as Olaf in Tampa, Florida during her 1989 World Tour, where she was joined on stage by Idina Menzel to sing "Let It Go". Olaf's name was included in a list of storms for the Pacific hurricane season by the World Meteorological Organization in 2015 and 2021.

=== Lawsuit ===
In March 2014, a copyright lawsuit was brought against Disney claiming similarities between a 2013 teaser trailer for Frozen and a 2D computer-animated film titled The Snowman. The plaintiff claimed that the scene featuring Olaf copied the frames featuring the "average Joe" snowman in the short film who also had a carrot nose. The lawsuit particularly claimed that Olaf was "substantially similar" to the snowman in the film. It was settled by the parties and dismissed by the court.

=== Accolades ===
For his work voicing Olaf, Gad won the category of Voice Acting in an Animated Feature Production at the 2014 Annie Awards. In 2020, he won another Annie Award for Frozen 2.
