= Kristoff (Frozen) =

Fictional character from the Frozen franchise

- Frozen character
- Kristoff as he appears in Frozen (2013)
- First appearance: Frozen (2013)
- Created by: Chris Buck; Jennifer Lee
- Voiced by: Jonathan Groff; Tyree Brown (as a child); Matt Lowe (Disney Dreamlight Valley)

In-universe information
- Title(s): Royal Ice Master and Deliverer
- Occupation: Iceman
- Family: Sven (companion); Rock trolls (adoptive family)
- Significant other: Princess Anna of Arendelle (fiancée)
- Nationality: Kingdom of Arendelle

Kristoff is a fictional character in Walt Disney Animation Studios' Frozen franchise. He appears in the animated features Frozen (2013) and Frozen 2 (2019), and the animated short films Frozen Fever (2015), Olaf's Frozen Adventure (2017) and Once Upon a Snowman (2020). Kristoff is one of two leading men in Frozen who take the role of Anna's love interest. His soft-hearted character was designed to contrast with the calculating personality of Hans. Kristoff and Anna's relationship develops out of friendship and was intended to depict the reality of love, as opposed to the hasty, romantic nature of Anna's engagement to Hans.

Kristoff was created by co-directors Chris Buck and Jennifer Lee and is voiced primarily by Jonathan Groff. He is a rugged iceman who lives in the mountains with his reindeer companion Sven. His design takes inspiration from traditional Sámi culture. Quiet and reclusive, Kristoff prefers a solitary life, but after meeting Princess Anna of Arendelle, he helps her on her journey to find her older sister Elsa on the North Mountain after she freezes summer with her powers.

Kristoff has received a positive reception for his sensitive and supportive character and his healthy approach to relationships. Critics have praised him for subverting the role of the traditional Disney prince and for representing a shift in Disney's portrayal of masculinity and gender roles, making him a positive role model for children.

== Development ==
=== Origins and conception ===
Frozen is loosely based on "The Snow Queen", a fairy tale written by Hans Christian Andersen. Walt Disney Animation Studios made several attempts to adapt the original story to film. In 1943, Walt Disney collaborated on a live-action biopic of Hans Christian Andersen and some animated versions of his stories with Samuel Goldwyn. After parting ways with Disney, Goldwyn went on to produce the film Hans Christian Andersen (1952). As a result, various unfinished projects at Disney, including The Snow Queen and The Little Mermaid, were abandoned. Disney returned to the story in the late 1990s. Chris Buck, who had previously co-directed Tarzan, pitched one of the story concepts titled Anna And The Snow Queen, but it was not until after the release of Tangled (2010) that the film was reimagined with a completely different story concept and with Buck as director. Buck said that his early inspiration for the story aimed to "do something different on the definition of true love. Disney had already done the 'kissed by a prince' thing, so thought it was time for something new". Producer Peter Del Vecho said that The Snow Queen is "a pretty dark tale and it doesn't translate easily into a film", thus the final film departs heavily from the original. He joined the project in 2011, while it was in development. Jennifer Lee was brought in as a writer but she had such passion for the project that she became co-director alongside Buck to save time by sharing duties. The story planning involved Del Vecho, Buck, Lee, the head of story and the songwriters working together.

The story of Frozen underwent numerous revisions and was initially much different from the final plot. Anna was originally intended to be a kind heroine, while Elsa was supposed to be the antagonist, akin to the character in the Hans Christian Andersen tale. Elsa has assembled an army of snow monsters in the final act, resulting in Kristoff coming to Anna's rescue. Del Vecho said that the story concept had to be changed because it felt like it had been done before and the characters were not relatable. Buck helped to develop the moment when Anna's heart is frozen by questioning "Does it always need to be true love's kiss that solves that problem? Does it always have to be the man who comes in and rescues the female?" The team eventually realised that the solution was an act of selfless love by Anna. Lee produced a new script for the final act but they were having a hard time staging it until a story artist named John Ripa storyboarded the solution with Elsa's emotions producing a blizzard. By showing Kristoff in the blizzard just before Anna and Elsa arrive, this gave the plot twists the perfect amount of time to develop and give viewers the impression that he will offer the answer.

During development, the filmmakers conducted research on relationships between brothers and sisters. For Kristoff, the Frozen team surveyed men about what it is like to have relationships with strong women. Lee stated "we were trying to get at what it's like to be a guy, trying to understand women". Kristoff continually changed throughout development and, in an early draft, he was written as a hoarder. Songwriters Robert Lopez and Kristen Anderson-Lopez originally wrote a full song for him instead of the short lullaby that appears in the final film. In early drafts of the film, Anna flirted with Kristoff immediately upon their first meeting, but this was changed after Walt Disney Studios chairman Alan Horn said that it would be confusing.

=== Voice ===
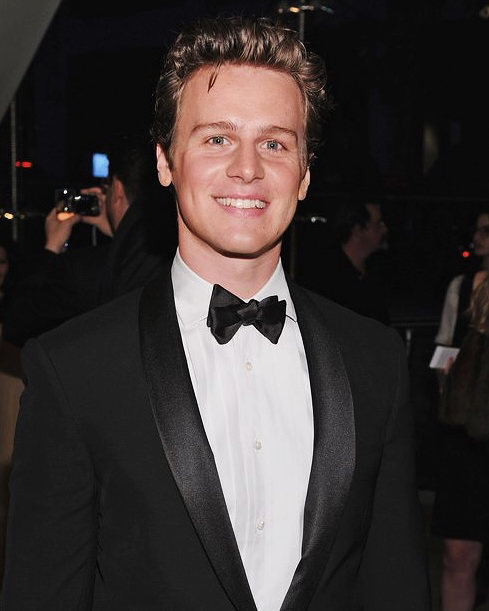
Jonathan Groff is the voice of Kristoff in the Frozen franchise.

Kristoff is primarily voiced by Jonathan Groff, while he is voiced as a child by Tyree Brown. Groff's casting was officially announced by Walt Disney Animation Studios in December 2012. Groff said that he was cast after Idina Menzel and Kristen Bell, with much of the casting process focusing on whether his voice was the right fit for Kristoff. During his audition, he recorded a few scenes and sang a Stephen Sondheim song "Everybody Says Don't" from Anyone Can Whistle, as Disney was searching for a voice that would work well with Bell's. Lee reacted to his voice, saying "everyone was swooning" because it was "like butter". Kristoff was Groff's first voice work in an animated feature and he was surprised to discover that the process involved recording the dialogue alone in a booth rather than working with the other actors. The role required him to record dialogue every six weeks for a year and a half. While recording his voice, the animators took video recordings of Groff and incorporated his facial expressions into the character's animation.

=== Characterisation ===
Kristoff is an ice harvester with a tough, rugged and scruffy appearance. He has a quiet demeanour and few friends apart from his reindeer Sven. Animator Tony Smeed said, "He doesn't relate to humans as much as he does animals." He worked on Kristoff to convey his thoughts and emotions using very few words and felt that his understated character meant that he would need to use just enough of his strength to complete the job. Paul Briggs, head of story, said that he represents the "code of being a man" by having a tough exterior but being soft at heart. He explained that he wears a mask that hides his true self and that Anna helps him to lower it. Lee confirmed that Kristoff is an orphan at the beginning of Frozen. Due to his love of the outdoors, he comes across Sven and befriends him. Groff said that as a result of Kristoff being raised by trolls and living in the wilderness, he does not have social graces and finds it difficult to communicate with others. He commented, "He's sort of charming but he doesn't realise that he's charming" because he has spent a lot of time living alone. Kristoff's story arc begins with him being a loner and the events force him to integrate back into society, which changes him as a person.

When discussing the two leading males in Frozen, Buck said that he and Lee wanted to create flawed characters. Lee said that their aim was to make Kristoff and the other characters "relatable and genuine". Del Vecho said that the characters respond differently in the same situations just like in real life, thus Kristoff is rugged, practical and lives "day to day", while Hans lives a more privileged, calculated life. Buck said that Kristoff represents "the messy part" of real love, in contrast to Hans, who represents romantic love: "He's not the hearts and roses kind of guy; he's like the real deal." Lee commented that this is best expressed in the trolls' song "Fixer Upper", which shows that despite being far from perfect, Kristoff has been raised with solid values, is there for Anna when she needs him, and also calls her out when she makes mistakes: "I think you have to be able to do that in a relationship." Groff commented that Kristoff and Anna's relationship is an "unexpected romance" that begins like a business transaction before developing into a friendship. He thought that this sends a positive message to children that the couple get to know each other before falling in love.

Sven is Kristoff's best friend and also acts as his conscience. Lee conceived the idea of Kristoff talking for Sven in a simulated voice due to talking for her cat at home. Buck agreed with the idea, saying that he also talks for his dog, and loved the idea that when Sven finally speaks, Kristoff pretends that he does not understand him. Groff described Kristoff's habit of expressing his emotions through Sven's voice in the Frozen song "Reindeer(s) Are Better Than People" as a "weird personality quirk". This later inspired Kristoff's song "Lost in the Woods", a 1980s-style soft rock song in Frozen II. Songwriter Kristen Anderson-Lopez decided that Groff should have more opportunity to sing in Frozen II, but developing a song for Kristoff proved to be a challenge due to him being a gruff, reclusive character. Groff said that initially he could not imagine a mountain man like Kristoff breaking out into song. A comedy song titled "Get This Right" was previously written for Kristoff, which centred on him putting pressure on himself, but it was abandoned. Anderson-Lopez drew inspiration from "a lot of drunk dudes singing Journey at karaoke" to convey a man expressing his feelings. "Lost in the Woods" uses Kristoff's relationship with Sven by incorporating a chorus of reindeers, which Groff also voiced. Anderson-Lopez said that Kristoff's solitary life in the woods parallels Anna's solitary life living in the castle, which results in two socially awkward people coming together and having the inability to express their feelings. Groff felt that the comedy in Kristoff's song would help young boys to better accept Kristoff's emotions and also help them to express their own feelings.

Lee said that to write the song, they had to get inside Kristoff's head and felt that a passionate '80s ballad expresses the depth of his emotions: "He does right by Anna. He is a hero to me, in that way." Groff said that for Kristoff's song he worked with the composers to find the right balance between humour and sincerity: "He's really going through it." He described Kristoff as a "Disney leading man with a sensitive side" and said that in Frozen II his role inverts the trope of the male character setting off on an adventure, while the female pines alone at home. In the film, Anna sets off on an adventure, while Kristoff sings about his love for her and offers her support. Groff noted that, although he appears at the end to protect Anna from the giants, Kristoff does not take control or steal the spotlight, but simply asks her what she needs. He commented that Kristoff is "an example for women of what they deserve and for men to take a page from Kristoff's book". When he finally proposes to Anna, it comes "from the heart". Groff said that he feels self-conscious due to the failure of his past three proposals to her, but it was just the "right moment". Although their marriage would technically make Kristoff a king, he has no personal ambitions.

=== Design ===
Concept art of Kristoff by Jin Kim

Kristoff diverges from previous Disney leading male characters by being characterised as a reclusive, working class mountain man: "He's not like your typical, skinny-legged jeans, Disney prince. He's a little thicker, he's got my thighs," Groff commented. He likened him to the Disney character Aladdin, saying that he preferred animated men to be "scrappy and adventurous". According to Groff, Kristoff originally had a beard but it was removed because it would have made him look too old for Anna. Groff explained, "Suddenly he felt like her father, as opposed to her potential love interest."

Kristoff was designed with a rough appearance to contrast with the elegance of Anna and Hans, but he still needed to fit within the visual style. The designers struggled to find a balance between his rustic design and the visuals of the other characters within the atmosphere of a live-action musical. Traditional clothing of the Sámi peoples were incorporated into his design with elements of folk art in his sash. His colour scheme was created to reflect Anna's colour palette. Head of animation Lino DiSalvo said that after first viewing Kristoff's design, they decided that he could look too elegant, so they added touches of realism, such as a wear pattern on one of his knees, showing that he rests on that knee each time he secures Sven's reins. Supervising animator Randy Haycock created a test of Kristoff awkwardly attempting to talk to Anna. He incorporated his traits of fidgeting by taking his hat on and putting it back on. He commented that Kristoff wants to be the perfect guy but knows he is not, so he tries too hard.

Although Disney took inspiration from Scandinavia's indigenous Sámi culture for Frozen, Kristoff's design drew some criticism. Anne Lajla Utsi, managing director of the International Sámi Film Institute, stated that it was, "not exactly how we would have done it". For Frozen II, the Walt Disney Company made an agreement with the transnational Saami Council and the Sámi parliaments of Norway, Sweden, and Finland. By collaborating with the Verddet advisory group, a group of Sámi experts, the filmmakers were able to provide an accurate representation of Sámi culture on screen. For Frozen II, Kristoff's clothing was designed with an autumn colour palette and features wheat and antler motifs. His final outfit was also designed to complement Anna's outfit.

== Appearances ==
=== Frozen ===
Kristoff first appears during the opening song "Frozen Heart" as an orphan boy with his baby reindeer, Sven. He grows up to become a seasoned ice harvester and arrives at Wandering Oaken's Trading Post and Sauna at the same time as Anna, who is searching for her sister Elsa. During a brief moment, he sings the short song "Reindeer(s) Are Better Than People" to Sven, revealing his negative thoughts towards other people. After being thrown out of the store for calling Oaken a crook, Anna buys all of his items and urges him to take her to the North Mountain. Despite being reluctant to help her, he eventually gives in.

As they head for the North Mountain, Kristoff is incredulous to learn about Anna's whirlwind engagement to Hans, whom she had met that day and questions her about what she knows about him. The conversation is cut short when their sled is attacked by hungry wolves. They escape by jumping from a cliff, though at the cost of Kristoff's sled. The next day they meet Olaf, an anthropomorphic snowman created by Elsa, who leads them to Elsa's ice castle. Kristoff waits outside while Anna tries to persuade Elsa to go back to Arendelle. She fails and accidentally gets hit in the heart, so Kristoff takes her to the trolls for help. The trolls assume Kristoff is introducing Anna to his family as his bride-to-be, but he corrects them. Pabbie says that Anna's frozen heart requires "an act of true love" to save her. Thinking a "true love's kiss" from Hans is needed, Kristoff takes Anna back to Arendelle.

On the way back into the mountains, Sven attempts to push Kristoff back to Arendelle but he refuses, thinking it selfish to pursue his love instead of letting Anna be saved by Hans. A giant snowstorm appears over Arendelle, prompting him to return out of concern for Anna's safety. There he eventually finds her in the blizzard, but she chooses to save Elsa from being attacked by Hans instead of running to Kristoff. Anna freezes solid, but Kristoff is overjoyed that Anna's sacrifice for her sister causes her to unfreeze. Elsa names him Royal Ice Master and Deliverer and he receives a new sled and a kiss from Anna.

=== Frozen 2 ===
In the 2019 movie, Kristoff, who is again voiced by Groff, plans to propose to Anna but his attempts to find the right moment repeatedly fail. When Elsa begins to hear a strange voice calling her and decides to follow, he accompanies Elsa, Anna, Sven and Olaf to the Enchanted Forest where they meet the Northuldra tribe and Arendellian guards. He and Sven accidentally become separated from Anna, Elsa, and Olaf, and he forlornly wonders whether he and Anna are growing apart in the power ballad "Lost In the Woods" In the final act, he finally overcomes his apprehension and asks Anna to marry him and she happily accepts.

=== Other appearances ===
Outside of Frozen, Kristoff appears in animated short films, such as Frozen Fever (2015). He appears in the 21-minute holiday featurette Olaf's Frozen Adventure (2017) which debuted in theaters for a limited time engagement. He also appears alongside Anna in the 2020 Disney short film Once Upon a Snowman, an animated retelling of the events of Frozen viewed from the perspective of Olaf. The film shows how Olaf gets a sausage nose and leads the wolves to Kristoff and Anna as they travel in the sled to the North Mountain. Groff again voices Kristoff in revisited scenes with Bell voicing Anna.

Kristoff also appears in video games. He is an unlockable character in Frozen Freefall: Snowball Fight, a match-three mobile game, which was released on Xbox One and PlayStation 4 in September 2015. Kristoff appears alongside the other main Frozen characters in the mobile game Frozen Adventures, a match-three puzzle game that launched in November 2019 to coincide with the release of Frozen II. Kristoff appears in Kingdom Hearts III (2019), with Jonathan Groff reprising the role. In the life simulation adventure game Disney Dreamlight Valley (2023), Kristoff is voiced by Matt Lowe.

In Frozen: The Essential Guide, published by Dorling Kindersley, he is named "Kristoff Bjorgman". Disney made a deal with Dark Horse Comics to bring Frozen and other animated films to comic book format. A comic series titled Disney Frozen: Breaking Boundaries, written by Joe Caramagna, features Kristoff, Anna and Elsa as they tackle disruptions in the kingdom. American rock band Weezer released a cover of Kristoff's power ballad "Lost in the Woods" with a music video featuring Kristen Bell. The music video follows Rivers Cuomo dressed as Kristoff as he wanders through the Enchanted Forest from Frozen II.

Kristoff appears alongside the other main Frozen characters in official merchandise, including board games, toys and playsets. He has also been created in the form of a posable doll. To coincide with the release of Olaf's Frozen Adventure, a "Festive Friends Collection", featuring dolls of Kristoff, Elsa, Anna and Olaf dressed in festive outfits was released in 2017.

== Reception ==
=== Critical response ===
Kristoff has received mostly positive reviews from critics. Chris Carle writing for IGN enjoyed the "winsome charm" of both Kristoff and Sven and praised the comedic effect of Kristoff providing Sven's voice. The Mercury News also appreciated Kristoff's conversations with Sven. Soren Andersen of the Seattle Times described Kristoff as a "well-meaning doofus", highlighting the comedic impact of him repeatedly attempting to propose to Anna in Frozen II. Courtney Enlow of Syfy complained that Kristoff was not given a song in Frozen, but was delighted that this was rectified in the sequel and described "Lost in the Woods" as an "epic '80s delight". Jackson McHenry writing for Vulture thought that Kristoff only getting half a song in the first film was "rude" and praised his subsequent power ballad as a "gift of big emotional bro energy", which he described as "an act of cosmic justice". Maressa Brown of Yahoo! described Kristoff as "the Disney "prince" we've always dreamed of", stating that after decades of Disney princes rescuing princesses, Disney had "finally entered the new millenium" by creating a "revolutionary" male lead character. In support of this, she cited his power ballad in Frozen II, describing it as "rare portrayal of a man expressing deep, romantic feelings" and commented that his relationship with Anna is an "egalitarian partnership we've never seen before in a Disney film". Discussing the evolution of the Disney prince, Guy Bigel of The Guardian noted the shift in the depiction of the male love interests in Frozen and compared Kristoff to Flynn Rider from Tangled, being a modern variant on the traditional male lead. He commented that Kristoff's relationship with Anna is "inconsequential" because the film's true focus is on Elsa and Anna's relationship, while in Frozen II he is sidelined within his proposal side quest. Monika Bartyzel writing for The Week considered Kristoff to be the modern version of Prince Charming because he asks the viewer to question Hans's true character and the wisdom of marrying a stranger, but also adds his own humanity. She noted that, not only does he think it important to get to know a person before committing, he is also careful and cautious in his behaviour after falling in love. She further praised him for the final moments of Frozen, in which he wants to kiss Anna out of happiness, but rather than grabbing her, asks for her consent.

Some journalists have also praised his romance with Anna. Jessica Mason writing for The Mary Sue praised Kristoff's sensitive nature and supportiveness to women, describing him as "a perfect example of non-toxic masculinity". She also considered Kristoff to be a positive role model for young boys in Frozen II. Jen Pharo of Grazia admired Kristoff's strengths as a romantic hero, describing him as a "rare healthy example for our children". She praised his respect and supportiveness for Anna, his passion for his work, and his physical and emotional bravery. Nora Dominick of BuzzFeed responded positively to his story arc in Frozen II for being a supportive character to Anna instead of trying to protect her and echoed fan reaction calling him the "best Disney prince". Becky Kleanthous of Digital Spy considered Kristoff's characterisation to be a significant shift in Disney's representation of masculinity and gender roles, by subverting the Disney prince and creating a male character that supports the female protagonist and talks about his feelings rather than saving the day. Gabi Zietsman of News24 praised Kristoff's healthy portrayal of love and highlighted that his line to Anna in Frozen II when he declares "my love is not fragile" had gone viral. She described it as "iconic" and one of the best moments in the movie. ABC 36 News echoed this in their review, describing Kristoff as "probably the most evolved iceman this side of Arendelle or all of Scandinavia". Alexandra Ramos of CinemaBlend expressed a desire to see Kristoff be given more of a backstory in Frozen 3, stating that he had taken a backseat to Anna and Elsa in the previous films.

Kristoff's relationship with Sven has been well-received by critics. Bustle's Caitlin Gallagher preferred Sven and Kristoff's bond to the relationship between the reindeer Bae and the robber girl from "The Snow Queen" fairy tale. The communication between Sven and Kristoff was applauded, with reviewers saying that "Kristoff voicing his impression of the reindeer's thoughts" provided humor, and mentioning that their interactions were some of Frozen's "funniest parts". Sven and Kristoff's bond was stated to be similar to the one between the characters Chewbacca and Han Solo from Star Wars since Sven is both Kristoff's "best friend" and "conscience" despite not being able to talk. Their relationship was also commented to resemble the one between the characters Maximus and Flynn Rider from Tangled. Kristoff was characterized as "strong, no-nonsense type", and their bond was regarded as "unique".

Reflecting on Frozen's impact a decade after its release, Gaby Hinscliffe of The Guardian commented that Kristoff as a "not-so-alpha" character in contrast to Hans has provided a useful lesson to young boys about "who gets the girl". A 2023 study at the University of East Anglia by Dr Sarah Godfrey, associate professor of film and television studies, reported that several adult Frozen fans, who were children when the film was released a decade earlier, had been impacted by the depiction of Kristoff and Hans by being more skeptical and wiser about the meaning of true love.

=== Merchandise ===
Several pieces of merchandise based on Kristoff have been released, including action figures. Kristoff has also served as inspiration for the creation of a plush rocking horse, puzzles, and a life-size toy. The company Funko has also manufactured figurines representing him, including Funko Pop! figures.
