= Frozen (soundtrack) =

Frozen: Original Motion Picture Soundtrack

Soundtrack album by various artists
- Released: November 25, 2013
- Recorded: 2012–2013
- Studios: Sunset Sound (Hollywood); Warner Brothers Eastwood Scoring Stage (Burbank)
- Genres: Pop; musical theatre
- Length: 69:40
- Label: Walt Disney
- Producers: Kristen Anderson-Lopez; Robert Lopez; Christophe Beck; Chris Montan; Tom MacDougall

Singles from Frozen
- 1. "Let It Go (Demi Lovato version)" Released: October 21, 2013; 2. "Let It Go (Idina Menzel version)" Released: January 2014

Professional ratings
Review scores
Source	Rating
Filmtracks	3/5 stars
Sputnikmusic	2.1/5 stars

Frozen: Original Motion Picture Soundtrack is the soundtrack album to Disney's 2013 film of the same name with eight songs written by Robert Lopez and Kristen Anderson-Lopez, and 22 score pieces composed by Christophe Beck. The soundtrack includes two versions of the critically acclaimed song "Let It Go", one performed during the film by Idina Menzel, and another performed over the end credits by Demi Lovato. The song won the Academy Award for Best Original Song, the Grammy Award for Best Song Written for Visual Media, and the Critics' Choice Award for Best Song, and was nominated for the Golden Globe Award for Best Original Song.

Two editions of the soundtrack were released by Walt Disney Records on November 25, 2013: a single-disc regular edition, and a two-disc digipak deluxe edition, containing original demo recordings of songs and score compositions, unused outtake recordings, and instrumental versions of the film's main songs. On October 21, 2013, the soundtrack's lead single, Lovato's cover of "Let It Go" was released. Subsequent releases have been accompanied by foreign language translations of "Let It Go".

The album debuted at number 18 on the Billboard 200 chart. The soundtrack has topped the Billboard album chart for thirteen non-consecutive weeks, and as of April 2015 has sold 4 million copies in the U.S. The album has been certified Diamond by the Recording Industry Association of America, and peaked at number one on the aforementioned chart, becoming the fourth soundtrack album from an animated film to reach that milestone.

== Commercial performance ==
As of December 11, 2014, the soundtrack for Frozen had had forty-three nonconsecutive weeks on top of Billboard Top Soundtracks. On the US Billboard 200, the album debuted at No. 18, the highest chart position for the soundtrack in an animated film since the 2006 film Cars. It later moved up to No. 10, becoming the tenth soundtrack from an animated film to reach top 10. The soundtrack subsequently moved to No. 4, which is the highest position for an animated film soundtrack since Disney's Pocahontas in 1995. In the week ending January 5, 2014, Frozen reached No. 1, surpassing Beyoncé's self-titled album (which had previously held the No. 1 position for three weeks after its unannounced release in December 2013) to become the fourth animated film soundtrack in history to reach this position. It remained at number one for a second consecutive week, becoming the first theatrical film soundtrack to stay at No. 1 for multiple weeks since Dreamgirls (also featuring Beyoncé) in early 2007, and the first animated film to spend more than one week at No. 1 since Disney's The Lion King in 1994 and 1995. With thirteen non-consecutive weeks at number one, Frozen earned the most weeks at No. 1 for an album since Adele's 21 (24 weeks) and the most weeks at No. 1 for a soundtrack since Titanic in 1998.

Frozen was the fifth best-selling soundtrack album in the US in 2013 with 338,000 copies sold for the year. Frozen continued to be the best-selling album in the US and the only album to sell more than a million units in the first half of 2014 with nearly 2.7 million units. The song "Let It Go" performed by Idina Menzel also finished at No. 15 on the digital song chart with 2.8 million copies sold in the first six months of 2014. The soundtrack reached its 3 million sales mark in the US in July 2014. Nearly half these were digital sales, making the album the best-selling soundtrack in digital history. Frozen was Billboard Year-End number one album of 2014, becoming the sixth soundtrack in history and the first soundtrack to earn this position since Titanic, as well as the second Disney album to reach this position (the first one is the soundtrack to Mary Poppins). It became the second best-selling album of 2014 with 3,527,000 sold for the year. As of April 2015, it had sold 4 million copies in the US. In Canada, the album has sold 202,000 copies in 2014 as of November 26, 2014. The album sold a total of 226,000 copies in Canada in 2014.

Worldwide, Frozen sold over 10 million copies in 2014 alone. It was the year's best-selling album globally. An exclusive vinyl LP edition of the soundtrack was released in March 2014. A version of the soundtrack featuring only the first ten tracks was released under the name Frozen: The Songs.

== Awards and recognition ==
At the 57th Annual Grammy Awards, the Frozen soundtrack was nominated in two categories – Best Compilation Soundtrack for Visual Media and Best Score Soundtrack for Visual Media (with credits going to Christophe Beck as composer) – and won the former; the song "Let It Go" won the award for Best Song Written for Visual Media, with credits going to Kristen Anderson-Lopez and Robert Lopez as songwriters and Idina Menzel as performer. The Academy Award for "Let It Go" made Robert Lopez the youngest person to achieve an EGOT.

== Track listing ==
All songs are written by Kristen Anderson-Lopez and Robert Lopez. All scores are composed by Christophe Beck, with tracks 11 and 31 co-composed by Frode Fjellheim.

Frozen (Original Motion Picture Soundtrack)
No.	Title	Performer(s)	Length
1.	"Frozen Heart"	Cast of Frozen	1:45
2.	"Do You Want to Build a Snowman?"	Kristen Bell, Agatha Lee Monn, and Katie Lopez	3:27
3.	"For the First Time in Forever"	Bell and Idina Menzel	3:45
4.	"Love Is an Open Door"	Bell and Santino Fontana	2:07
5.	"Let It Go"	Menzel	3:44
6.	"Reindeer(s) Are Better Than People"	Jonathan Groff	0:50
7.	"In Summer"	Josh Gad	1:54
8.	"For the First Time in Forever (Reprise)"	Bell and Menzel	2:30
9.	"Fixer Upper"	Maia Wilson and Cast of Frozen	3:02
10.	"Let It Go" (End Credit Version)	Demi Lovato	3:47
11.	"Vuelie" (featuring Cantus)	Christophe Beck and Frode Fjellheim	1:36
12.	"Elsa and Anna"	Christophe Beck	2:43
13.	"The Trolls"	Christophe Beck	1:48
14.	"Coronation Day"	Christophe Beck	1:14
15.	"Heimr Àrnadalr"	Christophe Beck	1:25
16.	"Winter's Waltz"	Christophe Beck	1:00
17.	"Sorcery"	Christophe Beck	3:17
18.	"Royal Pursuit"	Christophe Beck	1:02
19.	"Onward and Upward"	Christophe Beck	1:54
20.	"Wolves"	Christophe Beck	1:44
21.	"The North Mountain"	Christophe Beck	1:34
22.	"We Were So Close"	Christophe Beck	1:53
23.	"Marshmallow Attack!"	Christophe Beck	1:43
24.	"Conceal, Don't Feel"	Christophe Beck	1:07
25.	"Only an Act of True Love"	Christophe Beck	1:07
26.	"Summit Siege"	Christophe Beck	2:32
27.	"Return to Arendelle"	Christophe Beck	1:38
28.	"Treason"	Christophe Beck	1:36
29.	"Some People Are Worth Melting For"	Christophe Beck	2:06
30.	"Whiteout"	Christophe Beck	4:17
31.	"The Great Thaw (Vuelie Reprise)"	Christophe Beck and Frode Fjellheim	2:29
32.	"Epilogue"	Christophe Beck	3:04
Total length:			69:40

Frozen (Original Motion Picture Soundtrack – two-disc deluxe edition) (Disc 2)
No.	Title	Artist(s)	Length
1.	"For the First Time in Forever" (Demo)	Kristen Anderson-Lopez	3:33
2.	"Love Is an Open Door" (Demo)	Robert Lopez and Kristen Anderson-Lopez	2:02
3.	"We Know Better" (Outtake)	Kristen Anderson-Lopez	4:04
4.	"Spring Pageant" (Outtake)	Robert Lopez, Kristen Anderson-Lopez, Katie Lopez, and Annie Lopez	3:09
5.	"More Than Just the Spare" (Outtake)	Kristen Anderson-Lopez	3:25
6.	"You're You" (Outtake)	Robert Lopez and Kristen Anderson-Lopez	1:48
7.	"Life's Too Short" (Outtake)	Kristen Anderson-Lopez	3:52
8.	"Life's Too Short (Reprise)" (Outtake)	Kristen Anderson-Lopez	1:42
9.	"Reindeer(s) Remix" (Outtake)	Robert Lopez	2:26
10.	"The Ballad of Olaf & Sven" (Demo)	Christophe Beck	1:35
11.	"Queen Elsa of Arendelle" (Demo)	Christophe Beck	0:42
12.	"Hans" (Demo)	Christophe Beck	1:20
13.	"It Had to Be Snow" (Demo)	Christophe Beck	1:17
14.	"Meet Olaf" (Demo)	Christophe Beck	2:01
15.	"Hands for Hans" (Demo)	Christophe Beck	0:48
16.	"Oaken's Sauna" (Demo)	Christophe Beck	1:25
17.	"Thin Air" (Demo)	Christophe Beck	2:19
18.	"Cliff Diving" (Demo)	Christophe Beck	0:50
19.	"The Love Experts" (Demo)	Christophe Beck	1:02
20.	"Elsa Imprisoned" (Demo)	Christophe Beck	1:04
21.	"Hans' Kiss" (Demo)	Christophe Beck	2:11
22.	"Coronation Band Suite" (Source)	Christophe Beck	1:32
23.	"Let It Go" (Instrumental)	Robert Lopez and Kristen Anderson-Lopez	3:46
Total length:			47:53

Frozen (Original Motion Picture Soundtrack – two-disc deluxe edition) (Disc 2 – additional download tracks)
No.	Title	Artist(s)	Length
24.	"For the First Time in Forever" (Instrumental)	Robert Lopez and Kristen Anderson-Lopez	3:46
25.	"Love Is an Open Door" (Instrumental)	Robert Lopez and Kristen Anderson-Lopez	2:07
26.	"In Summer" (Instrumental)	Robert Lopez and Kristen Anderson-Lopez	1:47
27.	"Let It Go" (Instrumental — Demi Lovato Version)	Robert Lopez, Kristen Anderson-Lopez, and Emanuel "Eman" Kiriakou	3:45
Total length:			59:18

== Charts ==
=== Weekly charts ===
Weekly chart performance for Frozen
Chart (2013–2015)	Peak position
Australian Albums (ARIA)	1
Austrian Albums (Ö3 Austria)	9
Belgian Albums (Ultratop Flanders)	22
Belgian Albums (Ultratop Wallonia)	18
Canadian Albums (Billboard)	1
Chinese Albums (Sino Chart)	1
Danish Albums (Hitlisten)	12
Dutch Albums (Album Top 100)	2
French Albums (SNEP)	5
German Albums (Offizielle Top 100)	18
Irish Compilations (IRMA)	1
Italian Compilations (FIMI)	2
Japanese Albums (Oricon)	1
Mexican Albums (Top 100 Mexico)	3
New Zealand Albums (RMNZ)	1
Norwegian Albums (VG-lista)	3
Polish Albums (ZPAV)	7
Portuguese Albums (AFP)	13
South Korean Albums (Gaon)	2
Spanish Albums (Promusicae)	11
Swiss Albums (Schweizer Hitparade)	30
UK Compilation Albums (Official Charts)	1
UK Soundtrack Albums (Official Charts)	1
US Billboard 200	1
US Kid Albums (Billboard)	2
US Soundtrack Albums (Billboard)	1
US Top Latin Albums (Billboard) Frozen: Canciones de una aventura congelada	17

=== Year-end charts ===
2014 year-end chart performance for Frozen
Chart (2014)	Position
Australian Albums (ARIA)	3
Austrian Albums (Ö3 Austria)	24
Canadian Albums (Billboard)	1
Dutch Albums (Album Top 100)	17
French Albums (SNEP)	18
German Albums (Offizielle Top 100)	32
Italian Compilation Albums (FIMI)	3
Japanese Albums (Oricon)	2
Mexican Albums (AMPROFON)	16
New Zealand Albums (RMNZ)	5
Polish Albums (ZPAV)	31
Spanish Albums (PROMUSICAE)	31
US Billboard 200	1
US Soundtrack Albums (Billboard)	1
Worldwide Albums (IFPI)	1

2015 year-end chart performance for Frozen
Chart (2015)	Position
Australian Albums (ARIA)	19
Austrian Albums (Ö3 Austria)	13
Canadian Albums (Billboard)	47
Dutch Albums (Album Top 100)	6
German Albums (Offizielle Top 100)	29
Italian Compilation Albums (FIMI)	14
New Zealand Albums (RMNZ)	33
Spanish Albums (PROMUSICAE)	42
US Billboard 200	30
US Kids Albums (Billboard)	4
US Soundtrack Albums (Billboard)	3

2016 year-end chart performance for Frozen
Chart (2016)	Position
Australian Albums (ARIA)	80
Austrian Albums (Ö3 Austria)	23
Dutch Albums (Album Top 100)	55
German Albums (Offizielle Top 100)	50
Italian Compilation Albums (FIMI)	27
US Kids Albums (Billboard)	5
US Soundtrack Albums (Billboard)	7

2017 year-end chart performance for Frozen
Chart (2017)	Position
Australian Albums (ARIA)	95
Austrian Albums (Ö3 Austria)	46
Dutch Albums (Album Top 100)	92
US Kids Albums (Billboard)	11
US Soundtrack Albums (Billboard)	13

2018 year-end chart performance for Frozen
Chart (2018)	Position
US Kids Albums (Billboard)	16
US Soundtrack Albums (Billboard)	18

2019 year-end chart performance for Frozen
Chart (2019)	Position
Australian Albums (ARIA)	92
US Kids Albums (Billboard)	15
US Soundtrack Albums (Billboard)	20

2020 year-end chart performance for Frozen
Chart (2020)	Position
Australian Albums (ARIA)	94
Belgian Albums (Ultratop Flanders)	183
US Billboard 200	169
US Soundtrack Albums (Billboard)	6

2021 year-end chart performance for Frozen
Chart (2021)	Position
US Soundtrack Albums (Billboard)	15

2022 year-end chart performance for Frozen
Chart (2022)	Position
US Soundtrack Albums (Billboard)	23

2023 year-end chart performance for Frozen
Chart (2023)	Position
US Soundtrack Albums (Billboard)	16

2024 year-end chart performance for Frozen
Chart (2024)	Position
US Soundtrack Albums (Billboard)	25

=== Decade-end charts ===
Decade-end chart performance for Frozen
Chart (2010–2019)	Position
Australian Albums (ARIA)	16
US Billboard 200	4

=== Tracks ===
Title	Performer(s)	Peak chart position								Certifications
Title	Performer(s)	US	CAN	AUS	IRE	JPN	KOR	NZ	UK	Certifications
"Let It Go" (single version)	Demi Lovato	38	31	25	34	51	50	13	42	RIAA: 2× Platinum; ARIA: Platinum; MC: Platinum; RMNZ: Platinum; IFPI DEN: Gold; RIAJ: Gold
"Let It Go"	Idina Menzel	5	18	16	7	4	1	34	11	RIAA: 11× Platinum; ARIA: 8× Platinum; BPI: 5× Platinum; MC: 8× Platinum; RIAJ: Gold; RMNZ: 4× Platinum
"Do You Want to Build a Snowman?"	Kristen Bell, Agatha Lee Monn, Katie Lopez	51	61	45	35	—	5	—	26	RIAA: 5× Platinum; ARIA: Gold; BPI: 2× Platinum; MC: Platinum; RMNZ: Platinum
"For the First Time in Forever"	Kristen Bell and Idina Menzel	57	70	62	54	14	4	—	38	RIAA: 4× Platinum; ARIA: Gold; BPI: 2× Platinum; RMNZ: Platinum
"Love Is an Open Door"	Kristen Bell and Santino Fontana	49	—	89	—	36	21	—	52	RIAA: 3× Platinum; BPI: Platinum; RMNZ: Platinum
"In Summer"	Josh Gad	104	—	90	—	—	67	—	84	RIAA: 2× Platinum; BPI: Gold; RMNZ: Gold
"For the First Time in Forever (reprise)"	Kristen Bell and Idina Menzel	—	—	—	—	—	—	—	—	RIAA: Platinum
"Fixer Upper"	Maia Wilson and Cast of Frozen	—	—	—	—	—	94	—	—	RIAA: Platinum; BPI: Silver; RMNZ: Gold
"Frozen Heart"	Cast of Frozen	—	—	—	—	—	—	—	—	RIAA: Platinum; BPI: Silver
"Reindeer(s) Are Better Than People"	Jonathan Groff	—	—	—	—	—	—	—	—	RIAA: Gold; BPI: Silver
"—" denotes a recording that did not chart.

== Certifications ==
Region	Certification	Certified units/sales
Australia (ARIA)	5× Platinum	350,000^{^}
Austria (IFPI Austria)	4× Platinum	60,000^{*}
Belgium (BRMA)	Platinum	30,000^{*}
Canada (Music Canada)	7× Platinum	560,000^{‡}
Denmark (IFPI Danmark)	2× Platinum	40,000^{‡}
France (SNEP)	Diamond	500,000^{‡}
Germany (BVMI)	4× Platinum	800,000^{‡}
Italy (FIMI)	Platinum	50,000^{‡}
Japan (RIAJ)	Million	980,000
Mexico (AMPROFON)	Gold	30,000^{^}
Netherlands (NVPI)	Platinum	40,000^{^}
New Zealand (RMNZ)	5× Platinum	75,000^{‡}
Poland (ZPAV)	Diamond	100,000^{‡}
Singapore (RIAS)	Platinum	10,000^{*}
Spain (Promusicae)	Gold	20,000^{^}
United Kingdom (BPI)	5× Platinum	1,500,000^{‡}
United States (RIAA)	Diamond	10,000,000^{‡}
United States (RIAA) Disney Karaoke Series	Gold	500,000^{‡}
Summaries
Europe (IFPI)	2× Platinum	2,000,000^{*}
Worldwide (IFPI)	—	10,000,000
^{*} Sales figures based on certification alone.^{^} Shipments figures based on certification alone.^{‡} Sales+streaming figures based on certification alone.
