= Fixer Upper (Frozen song) =

Song by Maia Wilson, and Cast of Frozen

from the album Frozen
- Published: Wonderland Music Company
- Released: November 25, 2013
- Recorded: 2012
- Genre: Show tune
- Length: 3:02
- Label: Walt Disney
- Songwriters: Kristen Anderson-Lopez; Robert Lopez
- Producers: Kristen Anderson-Lopez; Robert Lopez; Christophe Beck; Chris Montan; Tom MacDougall

"Fixer Upper" is a song from the 2013 Disney animated film Frozen.

== Production ==
Kristen Anderson-Lopez talked about the song's inspiration:

Well honestly the inspiration for that is Bobby [husband Robert Lopez]. When we were first dating, I used to talk about him to my girlfriends as like he's a bit of a fixer-upper. He lived with his parents but I was in love with him. I knew I was gonna marry him but he lived with his parents, he didn't have a job. He was writing this crazy, puppet musical [Avenue Q] and so the word, fixer-upper, has always been in my lexicon.

Robert Lopez further elaborated on the song's context within the musical:

When we realized that Kristoff was going to have this relationship with the trolls which was kind of the key discovery we realized that it was kind of like okay, he's bringing this girl that he's not dating home to this big, ruckus family and they're gonna misinterpret the situation. So we thought oh, gee it's gotta have that kind of New York dating song cabaret feel and so that's how the music kind of came about.

== Synopsis ==
The song is sung when Kristoff brings Anna to his "family" - the trolls who treated Anna after Elsa's earlier accident. Kristoff seeks to have Pabbie treat Anna since he fears Elsa has injured her, but the trolls think Anna is his steady girlfriend and hence try to marry the two together. The song starts with the trolls asking Anna what is turning her off from dating Kristoff, like "his unmanly blondness" or his tendency to "tinkle in the woods". Despite Kristoff protesting that Anna is already engaged, the trolls go ahead and try to wed them. They manage to get partway through the vows before Anna collapses and falls into Kristoff's arms due to her frozen heart.

== Critical reception ==
IndieWire described the song as an "arbitrary upbeat ode to love's ability to triumph over imperfection so incongruous it's displaced to the middle of Frozen's soundtrack CD". DecentFilms stated, "There's a double entendre about another type of relationship that is said to be "outside of nature's laws": The trolls, singing about Kristoff in the "Fixer-Upper" song, suggest that he has an unnatural relationship with his reindeer Sven. Yes: a bestiality joke in a Disney cartoon". Dawn described it as "the opening from Fraggle Rock".

== Other languages ==
The Korean language version sung by Jung Young-joo and other members of the cast appeared on the Gaon Music Chart's download sub-chart at 200 after being downloaded 6,000 times; however, it did not appear on the main Gaon Singles Chart.

=== Charts ===
Chart (2013–14)	Peak position
South Korea (Gaon International Chart)	12
South Korea (Gaon Chart)	94

== Certifications ==
Region	Certification	Certified units/sales
New Zealand (RMNZ)	Gold	15,000^{‡}
United Kingdom (BPI)	Gold	400,000^{‡}
United States (RIAA)	Platinum	1,000,000^{‡}
^{‡} Sales+streaming figures based on certification alone.
