= Frozen: Olaf's Quest =

2013 video game

- Developer: 1st Playable Productions
- Publishers: NA: GameMill Entertainment; PAL: Avanquest Software Publishing; JP: Bergsala Lightweight
- Platforms: Nintendo DS; Nintendo 3DS
- Release: NA: November 12, 2013; EU: December 6, 2013; AU: January 18, 2014; JP: December 3, 2015
- Genre: Platform
- Mode: Single-player

Frozen: Olaf's Quest is a 2013 platform game developed by 1st Playable Productions and published by GameMill Entertainment in North America. In Europe, the game was published by Avanquest Software Publishing and Bergsala Lightweight in Japan. The game is based on the 2013 animated film Frozen, and follows snowman Olaf. It was first released for Nintendo DS and Nintendo 3DS in North America on November 12, 2013, in Europe on December 6, in Australia on January 18, 2014, and in Japan on December 3, 2015.

== Gameplay ==
The game is considered an epilogue to the 2013 animated film Frozen.

== Reception ==
Reception

Review score
Publication	Score
Nintendo Life	5/10

Orla Madden of Nintendo Life gave the game a mixed review and a score of 5/10. While a fan of the film, Madden criticized the lack of presentation, noting a complete lack of dialogue or storyline. Other criticisms included the repetitive gameplay, lack of humor, and a lack of appearances of other characters from the film such as Anna and Elsa. While saying the game would be fun for younger players, she asserted that older gamers would find little to enjoy in the game.
