= Frozen Heart =

Song

from the album Frozen
- Published: Wonderland Music Company
- Released: November 25, 2013
- Recorded: 2012
- Genre: Show tune
- Length: 1:45
- Label: Walt Disney
- Songwriters: Kristen Anderson-Lopez; Robert Lopez
- Producers: Kristen Anderson-Lopez; Robert Lopez; Christophe Beck; Chris Montan; Tom MacDougall

"Frozen Heart" is a song from the 2013 Disney animated film Frozen, with music and lyrics by Kristen Anderson-Lopez and Robert Lopez and performed in the film's prologue by a group of icemen.

== Production and writing ==
The Lopez songwriting duo explained that the song "has origins in a type of song used in past Disney films, like the 'Song of the Roustabouts' from Dumbo and 'Fathoms Below' from The Little Mermaid". Kristen said, "I guess we were in a meeting, and I kept saying: ‘if we could just have a song which basically said the ice is beautiful and dangerous and set up a little mystery'", while Robert added that the "masculine energy of the song establishes the expansiveness of the story". He said, "I think that's why 'Fathoms Below' is in The Little Mermaid. It's telling the boys this is going to be a story with songs, but there's going to be something in it for everyone... It's not just a princess movie. And Frozen isn't just a princess movie. It's got a lot of action and fun and entertainment and stuff like that, and 'Frozen Heart' kind of tells you there's going to be some violence in this story." From Director wrote, "The 'Frozen Heart' sequence plays like a fairy tale prophecy – a small story that brings ill tidings – and it's interesting to note that early drafts of the screenplay included a more explicit prophecy, hints of which can be heard in the song 'Spring Pageant' on the Deluxe Edition of the soundtrack album. The decision to drop this prophecy in favour of something less direct is one of a number of smart moves made by screenwriter and co-director Jennifer Lee."

== Synopsis ==
The significance of the opening song Frozen Heart is two-fold: as a tool for both exposition and foreshadowing. In the context of Kristoff's backstory, it shows his relationship with the reindeer Sven and how he enters the lonely ice business. The song also creates a thematic connection between frozenness and hearts - with ice being something of beauty and danger, which will become vital to the narrative later on.

The song is performed by a group of ice harvesters who are cutting blocks of ice from a frozen lake. Throughout the song, a young Kristoff and his pet reindeer Sven try to join the adult harvesters, but are constantly shut out; at the conclusion, they try to emulate the men's actions. The harvesters pile the ice onto a massive horse-drawn sled, then ride off under a night sky lit up by the Northern lights. The beat is supplied by the cutting noise as their saws cut through the ice, and gradually picks up as the song progresses.

=== Foreshadowing ===
Many of the lyrics supplied throughout the song foreshadow things to come in the movie, especially in regard to Anna's and Elsa's actions.

- At the end of "For the First Time in Forever (Reprise)" when Anna is struck in the heart by Elsa, an oboe is playing the melody for "Frozen Heart" in the background; specifically matching the lyrics "Cut through the heart, cold and clear / Strike for love and strike for fear!"
- The line "And break the frozen heart" at the end of the first verse, foreshadowing Anna freezing solid in the climax, but freeing herself by choosing to save Elsa from Hans, rather than saving herself by kissing Kristoff.
- The line "So cut through the heart, cold and clear / Strike for love, and strike for fear" foreshadows that only true love can break/thaw a frozen heart. It also foreshadows the two times Anna is injured by Elsa's ice powers; Elsa strikes once for love (by trying to save Anna from falling) and once for fear (by losing control in response to the fear brought on by the realization that she doesn't know how to undo the winter she created.)
- The concluding "Beware the frozen heart..." foreshadows the fatal ice in Anna's heart, put there by Elsa accidentally. It is also intriguingly ambiguous on just who should beware: those who know the person with a frozen heart (Elsa), the person suffering from a frozen heart themselves (Anna), or someone who is coldhearted (Hans).

== Composition ==
"Frozen Heart" is the opening number of Frozen, and is "a mood-establishing tune sung by workers cutting through ice".

From Director described it as "a song that's much more than it seems", adding "'Frozen Heart' is a surprisingly violent song to begin a Disney Princess film with".

== International versions ==
When the movie was first released in 2013, it numbered 42 versions worldwide, to which 3 more were added in the following years, raising the number of official versions to 45.

The Korean language version sung by Kim Cheol-han, Park Sang-jun, Lee Sang-ik and Lee Jae-ho appeared on the Gaon Music Chart's download sub-chart; however, it did not appear on the main Gaon Singles Chart. The Italian version, along with the whole Italian adaptation of the movie, was awarded best foreign dubbing worldwide by Disney.

Highlighted versions were released later than 2013

"Frozen Heart" worldwide
Language	Title	Translation
Arabic	"قلب الجليد" ("Qalbu-l jalîd")	"Frozen heart"
Bulgarian	"Ледено сърце" ("Ledeno sǎrce")	"Ice heart"
Cantonese	"冰山深處樁" ("Bing1 saan1 sam1 cyu5 zong1")	—N/a
Catalan	"Cor de glaç"	"Heart of ice"
Croatian	"Srce od leda"	"Heart of ice"
Czech	"Srdce ledové"	"Frozen heart"
Danish	"Det frosne hjertes slag"	"The beat of a frozen heart"
Dutch	"Bevroren hart"	"Frozen heart"
English	"Frozen heart"	
Estonian	"Süda külm"	"A cold heart"
Finnish	"Jääsydän"	"Heart of ice"
Flemish	"Koude hart"	"Cold heart"
French (Canada)	"Le cœur de glace"	"Heart of ice"
French (Europe)	"Le cœur de glace"	"Heart of ice"
German	"Kaltes Herz"	"Cold heart"
Greek	"Πάγος στην καρδιά" ("Págos stin kardiá")	"Ice in the heart"
Hebrew	"לב קפוא" ("Lev kafu")	"Frozen heart"
Hindi	"सर्द-ए-दिल" ("Sard-e-dil")	Unknown
Hungarian	"Jéggé fagytál már"	"You've been frozen already"
Icelandic	"Hjartað kalt"	"Cold heart"
Indonesian	"Hati membeku"	"Frozen heart"
Italian	"Cuore di ghiaccio"	"Heart of ice"
Japanese	"氷の心" ("Koori no kokoro")	"Frozen heart"
Kazakh	—N/a	—N/a
Korean	"얼어붙은 심장" ("Eoleoputeun simjang")	"Frozen heart"
Latvian	"Ledus sirds"	"Heart of ice"
Lithuanian	"Ledo širdis"	"Heart of ice"
Malaysian	"Hati beku"	"Frozen heart"
Mandarin Chinese (China)	"冻结的心" ("Dòng jié de xīn")	"Frozen heart"
Mandarin Chinese (Taiwan)	"冰凍之心" ("Bīngdòng zhī xīn")	"Gelid heart"
Norwegian	"Hjertefrost"	"Heart frost"
Polish	"Serca lód"	"Ice of the heart"
Portuguese (Brazil)	"Gélido coração"	"Frozen heart"
Portuguese (Europe)	"Coração de gelo"	"Heart of ice"
Romanian	"Gheața să o îmblânzim"	"Taming the ice"
Russian	"Сердце льда" ("Serdtse l'da")	"Heart of ice"
Serbian	"Моћни лед" ("Moćni led")	"Mighty ice"
Slovak	"Ľadové srdce"	Unknown
Slovene	"Ledeno srce"	"Icy heart"
Spanish (Europe)	"Corazón de hielo"	"Heart of ice"
Spanish (Latin America)	"Helado corazón"	"Heart frozen"
Swedish	"Frusen själ"	"Frozen soul"
Thai	"หัวใจน้ำแข็ง" ("Hŭa jai náam kăeng")	"Ice heart"
Turkish	"Donmuş kalp"	"Frozen heart"
Ukrainian	"Крижане серце" ("Kryzhane sertse")	"Ice Heart"
Vietnamese	"Trái tim băng giá"	"Winter heart"

== Critical reception ==
GeeksOfDoom wrote "The brute voices behind this opening track, all unified and macho in the vein of "I'll Make a Man Out of You" from Mulan and "Song of Mor'Du" from Brave, are strong in vocal quality and attitude. "This icy force, both foul and fair, has a frozen heart worth mining," they chant. The song swings in an entrancing motion as the men warn about the perilous ice". The site also deemed it a TOP 5 TRACK from the film, along with two songs and two score pieces. Rochester City newspaper said "Both the album opener "Frozen Heart" and the character-establishing "Do You Want to Build a Snowman?" deeply resemble Disney's song output under Alan Menken (Beauty and the Beast, Aladdin, The Little Mermaid") and that helps them feel instantly familiar". The Kilt wrote "The first two songs in the album, "Frozen Heart" and "Do You Want to Build a Snowman," give the listener a basic understanding of what Frozen is about", and said of the former: ""Frozen Heart" is a dark, but lively tune that represents the beauty, danger and power of ice. It has a chaotic, yet beautiful and clever mix of exciting Scandinavian folk and sinister orchestral music." DadInACape wrote ""Frozen Heart" starts the film off strong with a solid, sea-chanty-esque rhythm".

== Charts ==
Chart (2013–2014)	Peak position
South Korea (Gaon International Chart)	13
South Korea (Gaon Chart)	97

== Certifications ==
Region	Certification	Certified units/sales
United Kingdom (BPI)	Silver	200,000^{‡}
United States (RIAA)	Platinum	1,000,000^{‡}
^{‡} Sales+streaming figures based on certification alone.
