= In Summer =

Song from Disney's Frozen

Song by Josh Gad

from the album Frozen
- Published: Wonderland Music Company
- Released: November 25, 2013
- Recorded: 2012
- Genre: Show tune
- Length: 1:54
- Label: Walt Disney
- Songwriters: Kristen Anderson-Lopez; Robert Lopez
- Producers: Kristen Anderson-Lopez; Robert Lopez; Christophe Beck; Chris Montan; Tom MacDougall

"In Summer" is a song from Disney's 2013 animated feature film Frozen, with music and lyrics composed by Kristen Anderson-Lopez and Robert Lopez.

== Synopsis ==
The song is performed by Olaf (Josh Gad), and is a comedic and ironic ballad in which Olaf—an anthropomorphic snowman—expresses how he wants to experience the season of summer. He is seen in several positions, including in shades, relaxing in a hot tub, playing on a beach, dancing around sand people, and relaxing on a picnic, unaware that as a snowman he will melt, and therefore his dream is in vain. The song is considered darkly comical large in part because every single thing that Olaf does is something that will only make him melt faster.

== Background ==
According to Josh Gad, since Robert Lopez had already co-written The Book of Mormon (in which Gad was the original Elder Cunningham), Lopez already knew what type of voice he had, and so that influenced the type of song that was written for him. Gad also appreciated being able to perform a song "without 20 f-bombs in it", so it was acceptable for a younger demographic. The songwriters asked him to do "the operatic ending", a request that amused Gad.

He argued that the song was not morbid, and is instead filled with a "youthful optimism", as Olaf still acts like the ages of Elsa and Anna when they created him - he is the last vestige of their forgotten past - and therefore everything he does has a naïve and hopeful quality to it.

The song replaced an earlier song for Olaf titled "Hot Hot Ice," which Anderson-Lopez described as "Hot Hot Hot meets Simon & Garfunkel. It didn't work."

== Critical reception ==
Time dubbed it "the movie's mid-show-stopper" and "a musical-comedy miracle", writing "A soft-shoe number with brilliant choreography of character, voice and visuals (it ends with a swirling tracking shot that quotes the one that accompanied Julie Andrews singing 'The Sound of Music'), 'In Summer' makes Olaf's weather delusion sound and look deliciously delirious". CinemaBlend said it was "the film's best song", and National Catholic Register called it "the movie's funniest scene and best song". Variety said it was the "most inspired musical number", and added it was "wryly visualized by Buck and Lee and expressed in playful lyrics". The Morton Report described it as "Josh Gad's spotlight number", and noted that it "might not exactly drive the narrative, but it's hilarious." Rochester City Newspaper said "Josh Gad's distinctive, totally-committed performance gives In Summer a lot of heart. HighDef Digest said it was "a nice break from the darkness and action". New York Post calls it "a superb comic number, describing it as "a denialist fantasy on par with "By the Sea" in Sweeney Todd". Sputnikmusic said it was "charmingly heavy-handed", "It's one of the few pieces which doesn't take itself seriously, and as a result it's by far the best song on the soundtrack. The buzzing, nimble lyrics succeed as well, and the admittedly simple premise stays fresh throughout alongside whimsical string plucks and offbeat acoustic guitar." CraveOnline deemed it one of the two "unforgettable, showstopping number[s]" of the musical, along with "Let It Go", and describes it as "a delightfully wry confection". CommonSenseMedia, responding to Jonathan Groff's character's quips to try to burst Olaf's bubble, said "Groff captures Olaf's neurotic optimism in the hopeful tune "In Summer", describing it as one of the great character moment brought out through song." Paste called it a "show-stopping comedy number", and adding it "provides one of the few moments when Frozen fully lives up to the Disney's classics that have come before."

== Other languages ==
The Korean language version sung by Lee Jangwon appeared on the Gaon Music Chart's download sub-chart at 189 after being downloaded 7,000 times, however did not appear on the main Gaon Singles Chart.

== Charts ==
Chart (2013–14)	Peak position
South Korea (Gaon International Chart)	10
South Korea (Gaon Chart)	67
UK Singles (Official Charts)	84
US Billboard Bubbling Under Hot 100	4
US Heatseekers Songs (Billboard)	12

== Certifications ==
Region	Certification	Certified units/sales
United Kingdom (BPI)	Gold	400,000^{‡}
United States (RIAA)	2× Platinum	2,000,000^{‡}
^{‡} Sales+streaming figures based on certification alone.
