= Do You Want to Build a Snowman? =

2013 song by Kristen Bell, Agatha Lee Monn & Katie Lopez

Song by Kristen Bell, Agatha Lee Monn & Katie Lopez

from the album Frozen
- Published: Wonderland Music Company
- Released: November 25, 2013
- Recorded: 2012
- Genre: Show tune
- Length: 3:28
- Label: Walt Disney
- Songwriters: Kristen Anderson-Lopez; Robert Lopez
- Producers: Kristen Anderson-Lopez; Robert Lopez; Christophe Beck; Chris Montan; Tom MacDougall

"Do You Want to Build a Snowman?" is a song from the 2013 Disney animated musical feature film Frozen, with music and lyrics composed by Kristen Anderson-Lopez and Robert Lopez. The song is also present in the musical adaptation. As of 25 November 2016, the total sales of the digital track stands at 1,600,000 downloads according to Nielsen SoundScan, placing it second on the list of all-time best-selling Christmas/holiday digital singles in SoundScan history (behind Mariah Carey's 1994 hit single, "All I Want for Christmas Is You").

== Synopsis ==
After Elsa accidentally harms Anna with her ice powers, she locks herself in her bedroom. The song captures three different moments in which Anna tries and fails to persuade Elsa to spend time with her: as children, teenagers, and adults. Within the film, the last of these moments occurs after the sisters' parents have died at sea in a storm.

== Production ==
At one point Disney considered removing the song from the film because, as originally composed, it was too sad, and it was also too complicated in that it contained too much exposition. However it was put back after being well received by the Disney staff. StitchKingdom explains, "due to pacing of the film, this song was constantly being cut and put back in during the film's development. Ultimately, studio employees demanded it stay in." During the film's development, Lopez at one point had to travel to Los Angeles to work in person with the production team to try to fix the song, and they had to sit down and work through how Elsa sounds versus how Anna sounds. Christophe Beck, who wrote the film's score, added the interlude for the montage scenes.

After the film was released, a fan put together a version of the song to show how a reprise could have worked at the climax of the film, when Elsa realizes that Anna is completely frozen. Commenting on the fan clip in January 2014, Anderson-Lopez mentioned that at one point, she actually had pitched a reprise of the song for the film's climax. Lopez added, "if you watch it in the flow of the movie, it would be jarring to have them break into song at that moment."

When the same clip was mentioned in an interview, director Jennifer Lee explained that according to Disney music producer Chris Montan (who has worked on nearly every Disney and Pixar animated film from the start of the Disney Renaissance), it is traditional in Disney animated musicals to have no more songs after the end of the second act.

== Critical reception ==
The song received widespread acclaim from film critics, music critics, and audiences. USA Today called it "a lovely musical number that illustrates Anna's emotional yearning, sung with heartfelt sweetness by Bell." Alonso Duralde of The Wrap labeled it "poignant". Moviefone describes the song as "sob-inducing", and "the best song in Frozen". Scott Mendelson of Forbes talks about the "richness and a subtle sadness to the core relationship between Anna and Elsa, of so much time lost to fear, self-doubt, and some questionable parenting at a key juncture", and goes on to describe "Do You Want To Build A Snowman" as a "beautiful song...it's just one of a handful of terrific songs". Mendelson added, "I was deathly afraid [it] would come back as a climactic refrain should the story end badly."

Sputnikmusic said "The songs complement the gorgeous visuals well, especially in the first extended cut "Do You Want to Build a Snowman" and its tear-pleading climax and conclusion", and argues "It's one of the few vocal tracks far removed from the crushing vapidity of the other material". The Rochester City Newspaper described the song as "character-establishing", and noted that along with "Frozen Heart", it "deeply resemble[s] Disney's song output under Alan Menken...and that helps them feel instantly familiar". The soundtrack review adds, "While "Snowman" works better in the film (the visuals fill in some of the song's gaps) the twee-cute vocals and gorgeous melody help its memorability". AllMusic said this song and the love duet "Love Is an Open Door" have "contemporary Broadway dazzle".

The song is referenced several times in Deadpool 2 where a running joke is made out of the title character Wade Wilson / Deadpool (Ryan Reynolds) noticing, the "obvious" similarities between it and the song "Papa, Can You Hear Me?" from the film Yentl. As he is dying towards the end of the film, Deadpool sings the song's chorus to his teammates. In its 2024 sequel, the Marvel Cinematic Universe film Deadpool & Wolverine, Wilson's landlord Blind Al (Leslie Uggams) says the song's name as a euphemism for cocaine after Wilson informs her that the actual name is off limits, per Marvel Studios president Kevin Feige.

== Charts ==
=== Weekly charts ===
Chart (2013–14)	Peak position
Australia (ARIA)	45
Canada Hot 100 (Billboard)	61
Ireland (IRMA)	35
Scottish Singles Sales (Official Charts)	30
South Korea (Gaon International Chart)	3
South Korea (Gaon Chart)	5
UK Singles (Official Charts)	26
US Billboard Hot 100	51
US Heatseekers Songs (Billboard)	1
US Kid Digital Songs (Billboard)	2
US Holiday 100 (Billboard)	2
US Holiday Digital Songs (Billboard)	1

=== Year end charts ===
Chart (2014)	Position
UK Singles (Official Charts Company)	83

== Certifications ==
Region	Certification	Certified units/sales
Australia (ARIA)	Gold	35,000^{^}
United Kingdom (BPI)	2× Platinum	1,200,000^{‡}
United States (RIAA)	5× Platinum	5,000,000^{‡}
^{^} Shipments figures based on certification alone.^{‡} Sales+streaming figures based on certification alone.

== Notable cover versions ==
Kristen Bell sang the song live as her character throughout every stage of her life at the Vibrato Grill Jazz Club in Los Angeles to celebrate the film.

Twenty-six members of the Disney Channel Circle of Stars performed a cover video of the song in July 2014.

Country singer Mickey Guyton recorded the song and released it on November 6, 2015, to digital retailers and music streaming services. Her version charted at number 57 on the Billboard Country Airplay chart.

R&B sister duo Chloe x Halle performed the song for "The Disney Holiday Singalong" special in November 2020.

== See also ==
- Papa, Can You Hear Me?
