= Sven (Frozen) =

Fictional character in the Frozen franchise

- Frozen character
- Sven, Kristoff's reindeer companion, as he is depicted in the Frozen franchise
- First appearance: Frozen (2013)
- Created by: Chris Buck; Jennifer Lee
- Voiced by: Jonathan Groff (speaking/singing in Frozen II and LEGO Frozen Northern Lights); Frank Welker (sound effects, uncredited)
- Portrayed by: Andrew Pirozzi/Adam Jepsen (Frozen musical — Broadway); Collin Baja/Evan Strand (Frozen musical — US National Tour); Ashley Birchall/Mikayla Jade (Frozen musical — West End)

In-universe information
- Species: Reindeer
- Gender: Male
- Occupation: Kristoff's reindeer
- Family: Kristoff (companion); Trolls (adoptive family)

Sven is a fictional character in the Frozen franchise, produced by Walt Disney Animation Studios. He is a reindeer that lives together with his companion, Kristoff. Sven, alongside Kristoff, assists princess Anna in her search for her sister, queen Elsa, who has run away after placing the kingdom of Arendelle under an eternal winter. During their adventure, Sven also meets and befriends a living snowman, Olaf. Years after the events from the first film, Sven and the others go in search of a mysterious voice heard by Elsa. In the course of the journey, Sven meets other reindeer. Besides the two films, Sven is also present in the short film Frozen Fever (2015) and the featurette Olaf's Frozen Adventure (2017).

Sven was created by Frozen directors Chris Buck and Jennifer Lee. In the making of Sven's character, the animation team brought a real-life reindeer into the studio in order to study its behavior and incorporate the observed elements into Sven's portrayal. Nonetheless, because of the reindeer's lack of motion, Sven's depiction was eventually developed based on the mannerisms of a dog. His appearance was designed to be realistic.

Critical reception of Sven's character has been generally positive, with journalists commending his loyalty and describing him as lovable. Reviewers have also regarded Sven as a source of comic relief, and they have praised his relationship with Kristoff. Merchandise inspired by the character has been released, including stuffed toys and action figures.

== Development ==
=== Concept and creation ===
Concept art of Sven

In order to study reindeer for the development of the film Frozen (2013), produced by Walt Disney Animation Studios and codirected by Chris Buck and Jennifer Lee, the filmmakers went to a reindeer farm management in Røros, Norway, owned by the Sami people. The animation team also decided to bring a real-life reindeer into the studio to analyze its mannerisms and implement them into Sven's portrayal. The animators remarked how the reindeer scratched behind its ears using its back legs similarly to how dogs do, and they decided to make this one of Sven's habits as well. Nevertheless, after realizing that the reindeer did not do much besides standing in the same place, the animators decided to depict Sven as "an excited dog" and "an inquisitive pooch that sniffs around the place". Animator John Lasseter highlighted the resemblance between his Labrador and Sven, which derives from how both of them act. The filmmakers had initially planned to give the name "Thor" to the character, but the idea was discarded because of the excessive usage of this name among the company.

Frozen director Jennifer Lee felt Sven is the character that differs the least from the way he had been conceptualized since the filmmakers had decided from the beginning that he would never speak; she said the only change related to him in the making of the film was that his role in the story had become "bigger and bigger". Chris Buck, the other Frozen director, mentioned that he had tried to make the characters including Sven "as interesting and entertaining as possible". He further stated they had enjoyed deciding how Sven would be portrayed in the film. Buck commented that while Sven could have remained only a "pantomime character", Lee had proposed the idea of having Kristoff talk for Sven since she also does this with her cats; Buck had immediately perceived this as a "great idea" because of acting with his dogs in the same manner, and as a result the concept was incorporated in the story. Lee stated that the way Kristoff expresses Sven's thoughts is "fun". Buck further said he enjoyed how Kristoff pretended not to understand Sven when he tried to communicate with Kristoff through sounds. He described Sven and Kristoff as "best friends" and mentioned that Sven acts like his conscience. Lee commented that the filmmakers had tried to find similarities between Sven and the snowman Olaf in order to introduce the two of them in an intelligent manner during the teaser trailer for Frozen, and as a result they had decided to highlight their common interest in carrots.

The sounds Sven makes such as his grunts and snorts were recorded by the voice actor Frank Welker. Jonathan Groff, who provides the English voice for Kristoff, stated that while Olaf and some animals from other Disney films have the ability to talk, Sven cannot do so. He said that he had recorded a duet with himself for one of the moments when Kristoff expressed Sven's replies. Groff mentioned that the filmmakers had informed him when he had begun his work for the film that he would also provide a "reindeer voice", adding that he had enjoyed recording it. He said that "a lot of people have weird pet voices for their pets"; according to Groff, when he and the filmmakers were "exploring the world of that", he "tried a bunch of different voices" and they "landed on the one that is Sven". In a sequence from the sequel Frozen II (2019), which is viewed from Kristoff's perspective, Sven directly talks and is also voiced by Groff.

=== Design and characterization ===
Sven's design was created in order to highlight Kristoff's disheveled appearance. He was conceptualized as "dumpy" and unappealing so that he would look realistic. His appearance was created in contrast with the design of Santa Claus's reindeer from Christmas cartoon episodes. One of Sven's earlier designs depicted him as a reindeer with just one antler. Head of the animation Lino DiSalvo stated Sven's design is far from being majestic. He added that Sven living in the wilderness without being brushed offered him a battered appearance, which provided comic relief. DiSalvo said Sven's eyebrows are expressive, adding that Sven communicates through them. Story artist Chris Williams mentioned that he had not known how reindeer looked before working on Sven, stating that he had grown up believing they were the "graceful, powerful creatures" that were portrayed in cartoons. Clio Chiang, another story artist, regarded Sven as a stubby animal and referred to him as her favorite character. Bill Schwab, Frozen II's art director of characters, said that Sven's antlers are covered with "a fuzzy coating" in this sequel since it takes place during autumn. Schwab also stated that Sven's "harness has an autumnal wheat motif", which serves as a connection to both Anna and Arendelle; he further commented that this motif is found on many elements from the film related to Arendelle. He mentioned that while "Sven stands out" among the other reindeer from Frozen II since he is larger, "the Northuldra reindeer do feel like [they are] related to him".

After being asked about the similarity between Sven and the character Maximus from the film Tangled (2010) because of their doglike behavior, Jennifer Lee stated that she could not see the resemblance, adding that Sven is "not nearly as smart as Maximus", while Chris Buck shared similar thoughts. Lee further said that reindeer resemble dogs more than horses do and mentioned that Sven was created to be "a lot more like an animal" than Maximus; she elaborated on this by stating that viewers can understand Sven's thoughts only near the end of the story and that Kristoff "speaks for him and treats him more like a pet" compared to other animals from Disney films.

== Appearances ==
=== Frozen ===
Sven is a non-speaking reindeer, who has been a companion to Kristoff since they were young. Kristoff understands what Sven communicates through his facial expressions and movements, and he sometimes voices Sven's thoughts. The two of them work together harvesting ice at the beginning of the film, with Sven pulling the sled that carries the ice. Following this, they meet several trolls that are disguised as rocks, and a female troll adopts Sven and Kristoff. Years later, the two of them travel together to the kingdom of Arendelle on the coronation day of princess Elsa. In the forest near Arendelle, they subsequently meet princess Anna, Elsa's estranged sister, who asks them to take her to the North Mountain — Elsa's location after fleeing from the kingdom because of unwillingly placing it under an everlasting winter. On their way, Sven and Kristoff lose their sled after being chased by wolves, but Sven convinces Kristoff to continue helping Anna nonetheless. Later, they meet Olaf, a talking snowman created by Elsa, who offers to guide them. Sven alongside the others manages to help Anna reach Elsa's newly created ice castle, but after Elsa casts ice magic on her, the group brings Anna back to Arendelle. Soon after they leave Anna in her maids' care, Sven shows his intention to return along with Kristoff to her, and they immediately start heading toward Arendelle once they realize Anna is in danger on account of a snowstorm that is forming. On the frozen fjord near Arendelle, Sven then saves Kristoff from falling into the icy water. Because of their actions throughout the story, Sven and the others help overcome Hans, the evil acting leader of Arendelle, and contribute to Anna's permanent reunion with Elsa and to Elsa being able to bring summer back in the end. As a result, Elsa awards a medal to Sven, and Anna offers him and Kristoff a new sled.

=== Frozen Fever ===
In the short film Frozen Fever (2015), Sven contributes to the arrangements for Anna's birthday party, but he falls asleep along with Kristoff and Olaf in the meantime. They wake up because of several small living snowmen, who have been created by Elsa's sneezes and who wish to reach Anna's birthday cake. Trying to stop them, Kristoff accidentally spills a drink over Sven and himself. While running after the snowmen in an attempt to catch them, Sven ends up with his tongue stuck to an icy pole. Later, Kristoff climbs on top of Sven and holds the birthday cake in order to present it in this manner to Anna. After Anna and Elsa arrive at the kingdom's gates, Sven slices the birthday cake with the help of his antlers. Eventually, Sven brings the snowmen to Elsa's ice castle alongside Kristoff and Olaf.

=== Olaf's Frozen Adventure ===
Sven also appears in the featurette Olaf's Frozen Adventure (2017), at the beginning of which he brings a huge bell to the castle along with Kristoff to celebrate Christmas. He then helps Kristoff to explain a tradition among trolls to Anna and Elsa. Afterward, Sven and Olaf decide to go in search of family traditions for Anna and Elsa since they do not have any. On their way back to the castle after collecting many traditions, the sled pulled by Sven goes on fire. Following the sled's destruction, Sven and Olaf end up on opposite sides of a ravine. After realizing that Olaf has been approached by wolves, Sven immediately runs back to the kingdom in order to get help. Upon arriving there, he tries to explain to Kristoff what has happened to Olaf, but he manages to understand the situation only after Anna and Elsa correctly interpret Sven's message. They right away begin their search for Olaf, and when they find him covered with snow, Sven catches him by his nose and pulls him out. While heading back toward the castle, Sven stops alongside everyone else at a frozen lake, where Elsa creates a Christmas tree out of ice. Afterward, she places Olaf between Sven's antlers, and all of them look joyfully at the tree.

=== Frozen 2 ===
In the film Frozen 2 (2019), three years have passed since the events from the original film. Sven spends time alongside Kristoff, Olaf, Anna, and Elsa in the kingdom of Arendelle. Later, he assists them as they play charades. After Elsa starts hearing a mysterious voice, Sven and the others leave to find answers regarding it, and they arrive at a magical forest; there, they meet a tribe named the Northuldra. Among the Northuldra, Sven encounters other reindeer. After Anna leaves with Elsa and Olaf to find the voice, Sven accompanies Kristoff when he sings about Anna. Some time later, Sven and Kristoff save Anna from several giants. Once everything is solved, Sven runs happily in a circle with the other reindeer. Throughout the film, Sven supports Kristoff's attempts to propose to Anna, and he cries joyfully when the proposal happens. In the end, Sven and the people of Arendelle celebrate the coronation of Anna, who becomes the new queen after Elsa decides to remain in the forest.

=== Other ===
Sven appears in the 2020 short film Once Upon a Snowman, where events from the first Frozen film are presented from a different perspective, as well as in the animated comedy miniseries of shorts Olaf Presents, which debuted in 2021 and for which Sven's grunts had also been recorded by Frank Welker. He makes a cameo appearance in the film Moana (2016), in which the character Maui, who has the ability of shapeshifting, briefly transforms into him. The character also appears in the teaser trailer for Frozen, which presents an original story where Sven tries to reach Olaf's carrot nose after Olaf loses it on a frozen lake; while he initially has difficulties with this task such as remaining with his tongue stuck to the frozen surface, Sven manages to outdistance Olaf and arrives at his nose first, but he subsequently returns it to Olaf and bonds happily with him as a result. Sven is also present in an advertisement created for Sky Cinema, in which he pulls a sled, and in a Christmas advertisement.

Sven is present in the four short films developed by the company the Lego Group that are part of the brand extension Frozen Northern Lights, where he sometimes seems to be talking and is voiced by Jonathan Groff; he also appears in the book series resulted from the extension. Sven is depicted in a comic book series as a result of Disney's partnership with Dark Horse Comics. He is also portrayed in a comic book series published by Joe Books Ltd. Sven is present in a pop-up book written by Matthew Reinhart, in an adult coloring book, and in other books as well. He appears in the platform video game Frozen: Olaf's Quest. Sven is also present in the mobile games Frozen Free Fall, Disney Build It: Frozen, Disney Tsum Tsum, Disney Magic Kingdoms, and Olaf's Adventures. He is a character in the crossover action video game Kingdom Hearts III as well. He also appears in the video game Minecraft. Sven has been shown in emoji form. Costumes replicating Sven's design have appeared in the video game LittleBigPlanet 3, and in the online game Club Penguin. An alternate version of Sven is present in the television series Once Upon a Time, portrayed by a real-life reindeer.

Sven appears in the musical Frozen, in which he has been portrayed by the actors Andrew Pirozzi and Adam Jepsen on Broadway; the actors Collin Baja and Evan Strand have played the role of Sven on the North American tour, while the actor Ashley Birchall and the actress Mikayla Jade have portrayed Sven on West End. Sven has been present in the musical stage show Frozen – Live at the Hyperion as well. He is also featured in the musical stage show Frozen Jr., where the cast consists only of young actors. Sven has been a part of Disney on Ice's Frozen shows, and of Disney Cruise Line shows. He makes several appearances during the ride Frozen Ever After. Sven has also appeared on floats that have been displayed during parades at Walt Disney Parks and Resorts. Sven can be seen in special locations for photographs that have been arranged at Tokyo Disneyland, with one of them depicting him alone, and another one presenting him alongside other Frozen characters; a giant figure portraying him has been displayed there as well. He also appears during a roller coaster ride at Hong Kong Disneyland called Wandering Oaken's Sliding Sleighs. Sven is present during an attraction at Disneyland Paris, and he appears in a show there as well. Sven is also present in PhotoPass pictures taken at Disney's Animal Kingdom. He has been featured in a holiday window arrangement at Saks Fifth Avenue.

== Reception ==
=== Critical response ===
Sven's character has received a generally positive critical response, with reviewers praising his portrayal in the franchise. Writers regarded Sven as "lovable", and he was also characterized as "friendly", "goofy", "trusty", "sweet", "funny", "cute", "adorably anthropomorphic", and as having "a winsome charm". Critics praised Sven's doglike behavior, stating it originates from his "degree of understanding and loyalty". Sven was considered an "iconic" Frozen character, an "adored" character, and one of the franchise's "key supporting characters". He was also described as the "funniest" character in the story. Alonso Duralde of The Wrap stated that Sven differs from most of the other animals in Disney films since he does not speak, which obliges Kristoff to hold their conversations from both points of view. Sven was viewed as a source of comic relief, and the interactions between him and the other characters were also commended. Sven's "speed and strength" were praised as well. Sven was commented "to please younger viewers" in Frozen II, and his design was praised.

Journalists have compared Sven with several characters from other stories. Critics commented on the similarity between Sven and the character Maximus from Tangled, mentioning that Sven is "almost as inspired" as Maximus, characterizing him as a well-received "rehash of Maximus" because of the "canine" behavior of both characters, and describing him as "loyal, adventuresome, and very, very doglike" in the process. Nevertheless, IGN writer Witney Seibold felt that Sven is "not nearly as funny or as entertaining as Maximus". Reviewers mentioned that Sven resembles the character Chewbacca from the Star Wars franchise as well, stating the sounds they make are similar. Todd McCarthy of The Hollywood Reporter said there is a similarity between the Frozen characters including Sven and the characters from The Wizard of Oz novel, and Stephen Holden of The New York Times commented that the journey in which Sven was also involved resembled the events from this novel as well.

Sven's relationship with Kristoff has been well-received by critics. Bustle's Caitlin Gallagher preferred Sven and Kristoff's bond to the relationship between the reindeer Bae and the robber girl from "The Snow Queen" fairy tale. The communication between Sven and Kristoff was applauded, with reviewers saying that "Kristoff voicing his impression of the reindeer's thoughts" provided humor, and mentioning that their interactions were some of Frozen's "funniest parts". Sven and Kristoff's bond was stated to be similar to the one between the characters Chewbacca and Han Solo from Star Wars since Sven is both Kristoff's "best friend" and "conscience" despite not being able to talk. Their relationship was also commented to resemble the one between the characters Maximus and Flynn Rider from Tangled. Sven was characterized as Kristoff's "soft spot". He was also described as "a loyal companion to Kristoff" with "strong morals" since Sven regularly urged him to make the right choices. Their bond was regarded as "unique".

=== Merchandise and products ===
Several pieces of merchandise based on Sven have been released, including action figures. Sven has also served as inspiration for the creation of stuffed toys, plush toys with blankets, plush pillows, a plush rocking horse, plush backpack clips, and a life-size toy. The Lego Group has launched Lego sets containing Sven. Tsum Tsum toys in his mold have been produced, which either come alongside a sled, or are separate. McDonald's toys portraying him have also been created. The company Fisher-Price has launched Little People toys inspired by Sven. The company Hasbro has released miniature figurines based on Sven. The company Funko has also manufactured figurines representing him, including Funko Pop! figures, Dorbz figures, and Mystery Minis figures. The company Build-A-Bear Workshop has produced toys inspired by Sven as well. Bobbleheads depicting Sven have been created, and ornaments portraying him have also been released. Cups based on him have been produced, and sippers inspired by him have also been created. Items featuring Sven alongside other Frozen characters have been released, such as inflatable toys, Disney pins, a Monopoly game, puzzles, a Trouble game, T-shirts, sweaters, pajamas, knit caps, earmuffs, jewelry, rolling suitcases, tote bags, phone cases, water bottles, mugs, tableware, and bakeware. Drinks based on Sven have been produced, and cakes inspired by him have been created as well.
