= Working with Lemons =

American musical group

- Working with Lemons logo

Background information
- Origin: Riverton, Utah, U.S.
- Years active: 2014–present
- Members: Robbie Bagley; Camrey Bagley Fox; Porter Bagley; Ari Bagley; Anson Bagley; Mia Bagley
- Website: workingwithlemons.com

YouTube information
- Channel: Working with Lemons
- Genre: Singing
- Subscribers: 4.1 million
- Views: 2.52 billion
- Last updated: October 22, 2025

Working with Lemons is an American family musical group based in Riverton, Salt Lake County, Utah. Robbie Bagley is the group's director. The group's members consist of Bagley's family and friends. His siblings, Camrey, Porter, Ari, Anson, and Mia, star in the group's covers.

The Working with Lemons YouTube channel was created in October 2008. On March 15, 2014, the family uploaded a cover of Frozen's "Do You Want to Build a Snowman?" starring Bagley's sisters, Mia and Ari. It became a viral video, achieving 16 million views by April 2014. The group made more Frozen videos: "Love Is an Open Door", "In Summer", and "Let It Go".

Their Let It Go cover became the fifth most-watched YouTube video in the United Kingdom in 2015 when not considering music videos and became the group's most-watched video with about 350 million views by August 2017. By the end of 2014, the group averaged 18 million monthly YouTube views and made between $7,000 and $10,000 every month from its videos. The family has created covers of songs from Hamilton, Moana, Beauty and the Beast, Matilda the Musical, The Greatest Showman, Beetlejuice, Anastasia, and Dear Evan Hansen.

== History ==
The Working with Lemons YouTube channel was created on October 27, 2008. The family lives in Riverton, Salt Lake County, Utah. The group's motto is "When life gives you lemons, make movies." Robbie Bagley directs the group, which produces music videos that have accrued millions of YouTube subscribers and views.

After Working with Lemons uploaded its Frozen covers to YouTube, Robbie Bagley entered negotiations with The Walt Disney Company over granting the group the rights to create the Disney covers. YouTube videos make roughly $1 for every 1,000 views. Working with Lemons and Disney each get a percentage of the revenue generated by the videos. By November 2014, the group was making $7,000 to $10,000 a month from its videos, which were receiving 18 million monthly views. In 2014, YouTube granted Working with Lemons no-charge access to YouTube Space LA, a Los Angeles production studio available for content creators with 10,000 subscribers or more and no YouTube copyright strikes.

On December 1, 2014, Working with Lemons participated in a Radiant Foundation event at Rock Canyon Park in Provo, Utah, that broke the Guinness World Record for most people participating in a live nativity scene reenactment. According to a 2014 Tubefilter article, James Koo of Maker Studios handled the group's business affairs. In August 2015, the YouTube channel had 530,000 subscribers and its videos had 428 million views. By August 2017, the YouTube channel had 1.1 billion views and over one million subscribers.

== Members ==
The parents of the Working with Lemons family are Ernest and Jean Bourne, each of whom are divorced parents. After they married around 2010, their blended family had nine children. Jean's children are Robbie, Camrey, Porter, Ari, Anson, and Mia. Ernest's children are Taylor, Jordan, and Nathan. The family is part of the Church of Jesus Christ of Latter-day Saints.

- Ernest Bourne (born 1969 or 1970) answers questions on the Working with Lemons social media websites and is nicknamed "Father Lemon".
- Jean Bourne sewed the group's costumes for its Frozen covers.
- Robbie Bagley (born 1992 (Note: An article in the Deseret News published on July 2, 2014, said Robbie Bagley was 22 years old. An article in The Salt Lake Tribune published on January 4, 2016, said Robbie Bagley was 23 years old. The combination of the two sources verifies that Robbie Bagley turned 23 in 2015, so he was born in 1992.)) is the group's director and starred as Olaf in its cover of Frozen's "In Summer". He attended Utah Valley University, where he received a degree in digital cinema production in 2017.
- Camrey Bagley Fox (born April 1994) starred as Elsa in the group's cover of Frozen's "Let It Go" and performed in the cover of Beauty and the Beast's "Bonjour". Of the group's popularity, she said, "I think something that draws people towards our channel is our family relationships and that we all work together. . . . It's more universally viewable, in a way, because we're not putting controversial and edgy stuff out there." Bagley graduated from Weber State University in 2016. She married Jeremy Fox on June 10, 2015, and they had a son named Steven Atticus Fox who was born on May 3, 2020.
- Porter Bagley (born August 31, 1997) played Flynn Rider in the group's Tangled cover and Evan Hansen in the group's Dear Evan Hansen cover. In early 2016, he started a two-year mission in Keelung, Taiwan. He married Alice on March 20, 2020.
- Ariana "Ari" Bagley (born June 18, 2000) starred as older Anna in the group's cover of Frozen. Bagley starred in the Universal Pictures Home Entertainment film Scoot & Kassie's Christmas Adventure as one of the title/main characters, Kassie Stevenson, that was released in late 2013. About a year later, she reprised her role as Kassie in the sequel, K-9 Adventures: Legend of the Lost Gold, which came out in 2014.
- Anson Bagley (born July 1, 2003) starred as Hans in the group's cover of "Love Is an Open Door" from Frozen and as Alexander Hamilton in the group's first Hamilton cover. Bagley played a role in Criminal Minds's season 10 Halloween episode. Bagley played Tiny Tim in Pioneer Theatre Company's 2012 production of the A Christmas Carol musical. Deseret News reviewer Blair Howell found his singing "delightfully sweet". He acted in many shows at Hale Centre Theatre including playing Dickon in the musical The Secret Garden in 2018.
- Mia Bagley (born October 6, 2005) starred as young Anna in the group's cover of Frozen. Of performing, she said in a 2016 The Salt Lake Tribune interview, "It's fun. You get to play different characters. You just get to try stuff out." She twice received and rejected offers to portray Cindy Lou Who in Dr. Seuss' How the Grinch Stole Christmas! The Musical because she wanted to continue working on family musical projects. Bagley played Anna Gellar in the 2015 film I'm Not Ready for Christmas. In 2018, Bagley portrayed main character Winnie Foster in Sandy, Utah–based Hale Centre Theatre's production of the musical Tuck Everlasting. Reviewer Whitney Butters Wilde praised Bagley's performance, writing that she "does an exceptional job as the audience watches her grow up onstage in a short amount of time, showing the maturity that accompanies coming to understand a bit more of the complexities of life and time".

== Covers ==
=== Frozen covers ===
Robbie Bagley and Jeane Bourne, his mother, conceived of making a cover of "Do You Want to Build a Snowman?" starring his sisters, Mia and Ari, after they noticed Mia looked like Anna from the 2013 film Frozen. On March 15, 2014, they uploaded their cover. Filmed by Robbie, the video starred Mia as a young Anna and Ariana as a teen Anna and received over 16 million views by April of that year and over 46 million views by July of that year. Jeane Bourne reused fabric at their home to make a costume for Mia, and they used duct tape for Mia's oversized shoes. They spent $5.49 to produce the video. The expense was from purchasing contact paper which they covered in blue paint for the door in the video. They filmed the video with a digital single-lens reflex camera a friend lent them, recorded the dialogue and singing using a Rock Band video game microphone, used GarageBand's no-cost software, and created a pop filter from nylon tights and a clothes hanger. They filmed for two days for seven hours each day. Sean P. Means of The Salt Lake Tribune called the cover "accurate and quite touching".

The popularity of their "Do You Want to Build a Snowman?" cover convinced Robbie Bagley and Jeane Bourne to create a cover of a second Frozen song, "Love Is an Open Door", which they had earlier considered making. Starring Mia and her brother Anson, the cover was released on YouTube on May 22, 2014, and by July of that year, it had received over 14 million views. With the money earned from their first cover, Working with Lemons was able to increase the budget for "Love is an Open Door" by purchasing higher quality costumes. They filmed the music video at the Thanksgiving Point complex in Lehi, Utah, and attempted to model their set after the movie's. Bustle reviewer Olivia Truffaut-Wong said that although the "vocals might leave something to be desired", the cover was "simply adorable" and "absolutely irresistible" by having "Frozen with kids" with a "a mini Anna and mini Hans".

Working with Lemons on June 24, 2014, uploaded to YouTube their cover of "In Summer" starring Robbie Bagley. The group's cover of Frozen's "Let It Go" song was the fifth most-watched YouTube video of 2015 in the United Kingdom when not considering music videos. Released on March 20, 2015, the cover featured Robbie's sister, Camrey Bagley. With about 350 million views by August 2017, their Let It Go cover is their most-watched video.

=== Hamilton covers ===
Working with Lemons uploaded their first Hamilton cover, featuring the songs "Aaron Burr, Sir" and "My Shot". Released on August 26, 2016, the cover featured Anson Bagley starring as Alexander Hamilton.

They released a cover of the Hamilton song "The Schuyler Sisters" on September 30, 2016. Filming for the music video took place at Salt Lake City's This Is the Place Heritage Park. The group published to YouTube their cover of the Hamilton song "Dear Theodosia" on June 9, 2017. The music video features costumes and a set from Hamilton's era and according to Deseret News reviewers is an "early Father's Day tribute" that "gives insights into a father's perspective as he watches his child grow up". On May 25, 2018, Working with Lemons uploaded their cover of another Hamilton song, "Helpless", which they filmed at This Is the Place Heritage Park.

=== Other covers ===
Working with Lemons on March 24, 2017, uploaded a cover of the film Moana's "I Am Moana" song that they filmed at the Polynesian Cultural Center in Hawaii. They released a cover of Belle from Beauty and the Beast on YouTube on March 31, 2017. For Belle, they collaborated with participants in Camp Kostopulos, a Salt Lake special needs camp, to commemorate Camp K's 50th anniversary. The music video was filmed at Emigration Canyon, Utah. Don Hudson, a KTVX anchor, was Gaston in the cover.

On September 29, 2017, Working with Lemons uploaded a cover of "Revolting Children" from Matilda the Musical that supports "a kid's right to be a kid". They uploaded a cover of "A Lovely Night" from the La La Land film on August 4, 2017. Starring Mia Bagley and Cooper Johnson who tap dance through the street, the cover "highlight[ed] the witty jabs in the lyrics" by having it performed by 11-year-olds according to Deseret News reviewer Danielle Christensen. The children wore clothes that matched those in the movie with Bagley wearing a yellow dress and Johnson wearing a wool suit.

Working with Lemons uploaded a cover of "A Million Dreams" from The Greatest Showman film on February 1, 2018, starring Mia Bagley and Cooper Johnson. They released a cover of "Journey to the Past" from the film Anastasia on February 23, 2018. Deseret News reviewer Sydney Jorgensen said that the cover's star "sings and dances through the wintry forest and befriends a cute puppy as she brings the music to life". The group on July 27, 2018, posted a cover of "Waving Through a Window" from the musical Dear Evan Hansen to alert viewers about suicide prevention.
