= Love Is an Open Door =

Song by Kristen Bell and Santino Fontana

from the album Frozen
- Published: Wonderland Music Company
- Released: November 25, 2013
- Recorded: August 2012
- Genre: Show tune
- Length: 2:07
- Label: Walt Disney
- Songwriters: Kristen Anderson-Lopez; Robert Lopez
- Producers: Kristen Anderson-Lopez; Robert Lopez; Christophe Beck; Chris Montan; Tom MacDougall

"Love Is an Open Door" is a song written by Kristen Anderson-Lopez and Robert Lopez for Walt Disney Animation Studios's 53rd animated feature film Frozen (2013). Performed by Kristen Bell and Santino Fontana as Anna and Prince Hans respectively, "Love Is an Open Door" is a romantic duet which takes place during the first act of the film, when Anna meets Hans during the reception of her sister Elsa's coronation. The song was intended by Lopez and Anderson-Lopez to "feel like the perfect first date", inspired by the date depicted in the film The Karate Kid (1984).

== Production ==
The notion of a song that doubled up as a romantic duet and the villain song came to fruition after the writers decided to turn Elsa into a tragic hero rather than a villain, leaving the door open for Hans to become the villain of the film. The first song written for the film, "You're You", was cut from the film, due to Hans interrupting Anna in the song, an act which would have lessened Hans's reveal as a villain later in the film. "Love Is an Open Door" was eventually also recorded by Demi Lovato, but never released.

The song is inspired by the date depicted in the film The Karate Kid (1984), and it is "intended to feel like the perfect first date", according to the songwriters. The line about finishing "each other's sandwiches" originally had nothing to do with the television show Arrested Development. Anderson-Lopez explained she was eating a sandwich at the time she wrote the line, but had not seen the show, and it was not until Lopez's brother pointed out the connection that they realized audience members might hear it as an Arrested Development reference. They tried pitching a couple of alternate versions to Disney, but the line about sandwiches stayed in.

== Synopsis ==
The song is written as an apparent love duet sung by Princess Anna of Arendelle with Prince Hans of the Southern Isles. Anna opens the song by explaining to Hans her loneliness by being shut out from Elsa for years, with Hans promising to never shut her out. As the night goes on, the two gradually find themselves sharing a lot in common, and towards the end of the night, Hans proposes to Anna, and she accepts.

=== Musical version ===
In the Broadway musical version of Frozen, "Love is an Open Door" is extended, adding a dance sequence right where the original would end with Hans and Anna interacting with each other. A slightly extended reprise of the second chorus then occurs after Hans proposes to Anna.

== International versions ==
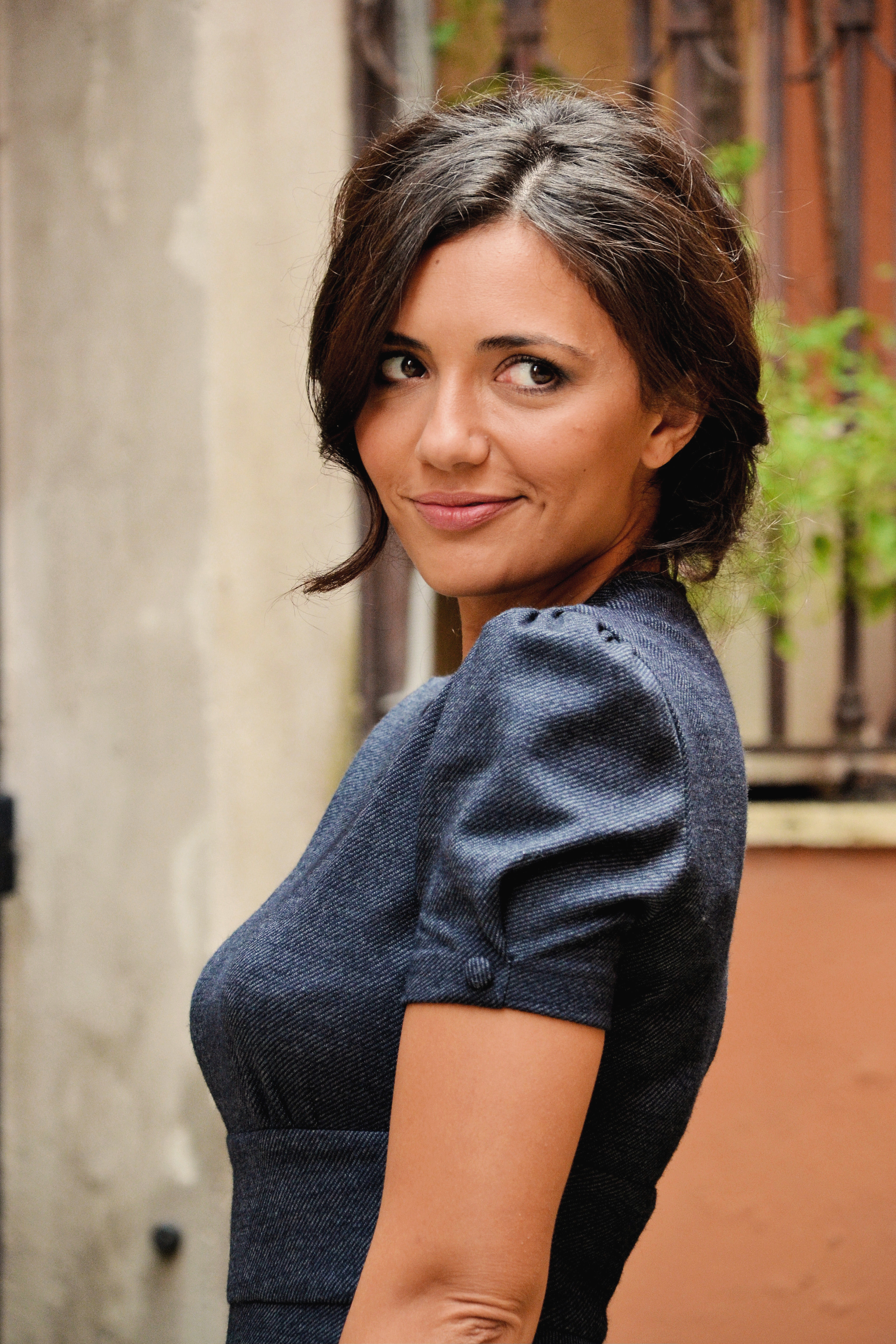
Italian actress and singer Serena Rossi and the Italian cast of Frozen were awarded best foreign dubbing worldwide

Several other language versions of the song have also been successful. The Japanese-language version called "Tobira Akete" (とびら開けて; "Open the Door") was sung by Sayaka Kanda and Eisuke Tsuda. It appeared on the Billboard Japan Hot 100 in May 2014, peaking at number 36. After five months, the song was certified gold for 100,000 downloads by the RIAJ. The Korean language version, sung by Park Ji-yoon and Yun Seong-guk, reached 131 on the Gaon Singles Chart, being downloaded 14,000 times.

The Italian version, along with the whole Italian adaptation of the movie, was awarded best foreign dubbing worldwide.

Since 2013, some local TV stations have been dubbing the movie in their local languages, creating some unofficial versions. Namely: Abkhaz, Albanian, Arabic, Kabardian, Karachay-Balkar, Persian and Tagalog.

== Critical reception ==
TheWrap said the song "sounds as if it came out of the High School Musical unused-song drawer". Neon Tommy wrote, "One of my favorite things about 'Frozen' is how ably it toes the line between earnestly telling the story and being cognizant of its heritage. 'Love is an Open Door' is a perfect example of that, putting a quirky spin on a typical lovers' duet. Anna is a delightfully odd character (and who wouldn't be, in her circumstances?), and this song paints a very effective picture of who Anna is".

Geek Magazine said it was "a hilarious exploration of the insanity of love at first sight and really catchy". The National Catholic Register said it was "one of many forgettable numbers, and, like 'Let It Go' is emotionally out of step with the larger drama". Rotoscopers described it as "a quirky, even a little bit cheesy tune that works perfectly in the movie". CraveOnline wrote, "'Do You Want to Build a Snowman?' and 'Love is an Open Door', are fun to listen to and boast thoughtful, clever lyrics that – unlike most musicals these days (or ever) – often feel like they were genuinely made up on the spot by people who just couldn’t help but sing their feelings." The Atlantic's article How Parents Can Turn Frozen's Big Twist Into a Teachable Moment argues that parents can use the juxtaposition between this song and the big reveal toward the end of the movie to teach their kids about things being too good to be true and being cautious of charmers with ulterior motives.

== Charts ==
Chart (2013–14)	Peak position
Australia (ARIA)	94
South Korea (Gaon International Chart)	2
South Korea (Gaon Chart)	21
UK Singles (Official Charts)	56
US Billboard Hot 100	49

== Certifications ==
Region	Certification	Certified units/sales
United Kingdom (BPI)	Platinum	600,000^{‡}
United States (RIAA)	4× Platinum	4,000,000^{‡}
^{‡} Sales+streaming figures based on certification alone.
