= I'm Not Ready for Christmas =

- Promotional poster of George Stults and Alicia Witt
- Written by: Hanz Wasserburger
- Story by: Jeffrey Schenck; Peter Sullivan
- Directed by: Sam Irvin
- Starring: Alicia Witt; George Stults; Brigid Brannagh; Maxwell Caulfield; Dan Lauria
- Theme music composer: Nick Soole
- Country of origin: United States
- Original language: English

Production
- Producer: Kimberly A. Ray
- Cinematography: Theo Angell
- Editor: Brian Brinkman
- Running time: 84 minutes
- Production company: Hybrid/ Mayor Entertainment

Original release
- Network: Hallmark Channel
- Release: November 14, 2015

I'm Not Ready for Christmas is a 2015 American Christmas-themed made-for-television romantic drama film directed by Sam Irvin and starring Alicia Witt, George Stults, Brigid Brannagh, and Dan Lauria. Written by Hanz Wasserburger. The film premiered on the Hallmark Channel on November 14, 2015.

== Plot summary ==
Holly Nolan (Alicia Witt) a driven advertising executive, has her life turned upside down when she discovers that she can no longer lie. Holly is an aunt to 10 year old Anna who missed a very important Christmas recital where Anna was patiently waiting for her arrival. During the recital Anna sings a solo of We Wish You a Merry Christmas. Holly lied to Anna about why she could not make the recital. This resulted in Anna (Mia Bagley) making a wish to Santa Claus (Dan Lauria) Holly's career and love life become complicated when her lies begin to catch up with her, forcing her to judge between truth and what is right.

== Cast ==
- Alicia Witt as Holly Nolan
- George Stults as Drew Vincent
- Brigid Brannagh as Rose Geller
- Dan Lauria as Santa
- Maxwell Caulfield as Greydon DuPois
- Mia Bagley as Anna Gellar
- Eli Baldwin as Damon Brouhard
- Derrick Dean as Team Member #2
- Terance Goodman as Man
- Chiao-ih Hui as Team Member #3
- Malinda Money as Team Member #1
- Zack Phifer as Ted Angle
- Walter Platz as Berkeley O'Connell
- Ashley Santos as Jordan Jones
- Palmer Scott as James Brouhard
- Joseph Skousen as Valet

== See also ==
- List of Christmas films
- Liar Liar, 1997 film
