= Necrosis (film) =

2009 film by Jason Stephens

- Pre-release poster
- Directed by: Jason Robert Stephens
- Written by: Robert Michael Ryan; Jason Stephens
- Produced by: John Dobroth; Robert Reynoso; Al Weigand
- Starring: James Kyson Lee; Tiffany; George Stults
- Cinematography: Deanna Esmaeel
- Edited by: Joshua Chamberlain
- Music by: Jonathan Price
- Distributed by: American World Pictures
- Release dates: December 16, 2009 (Czech Republic); March 5, 2010 (United States)
- Running time: 90 minutes
- Country: United States
- Language: English

Necrosis (released internationally as Blood Snow) is a 2009 independent psychological thriller film directed by Jason Robert Stephens and stars James Kyson Lee, Tiffany, George Stults and Michael Berryman.

== Plot ==
During the winter of 1846, a group of ill-fated pioneers, known as the Donner Party, were on their way to California through a newly discovered mountain pass. They encountered the worst blizzard ever recorded, trapping them with little food or shelter.

As days turned into weeks, and weeks into months, the members of the Donner Party slowly dissolved into madness, eventually turning on each other in what became a desperate, cannibalistic slaughter.

The story then goes to 2008 as six friends arrive at an isolated cabin to enjoy a long weekend in the snow. An epic snowstorm interrupts their vacation, trapping them on the mountain and resurrecting the haunting ghosts of the Donner Party. They struggle to find out whether these are the true demonic 'entities' or if it is simply 'cabin fever' that is bringing out their fears and paranoia, causing friends to turn against each other as their reality deteriorates around them.

== Cast ==
- James Kyson Lee as Jerry
- Tiffany as Karen
- George Stults as Matt
- Penny Drake as Megan
- Robert Michael Ryan as Michael
- Danielle De Luca as Samantha
- Michael Berryman as Seymour
- Mickey Jones as Hank
- Kymberly Jane as Denise, the "vampire"

== Production ==
The film began principal photography on January 19, 2008 in South Lake Tahoe California. Additional scenes were filmed in Big Bear, California, and Ventura, California. It was produced by Unknown Productions and distributed in the US by Brink DVD and Internationally by American World Pictures.

== Release ==
The film was sold on 9 November 2009 at the American Film Market and the film was released on DVD on 20 April 2010 in the United States. In Japan, Necrosis was released to film theaters on 5 March 2010.

== See also ==
- The Donner Party – a 2009 film based on the ill-fated Donner Party expedition
- Cannibalism in popular culture
