= Ouija House =

- Promotional poster
- Directed by: Ben Demaree
- Written by: Justin Hawkins; Jeff Miller
- Starring: Tara Reid; Mischa Barton; Carly Schroeder; Dee Wallace
- Cinematography: Ben Demaree
- Edited by: Ben Demaree
- Music by: Jonathan Price
- Release date: May 5, 2018 (Texas Frightmare Weekend)
- Running time: 95 minutes
- Country: United States
- Language: English

Ouija House is a 2018 American supernatural horror film directed by Ben Demaree. The film stars Tara Reid, Mischa Barton, Carly Schroeder (in her final film role) and Dee Wallace. The film premiered at the Texas Frightmare Weekend on May 5, 2018.

== Plot summary ==
A graduate student trying to complete her book on the paranormal, brings friends to a house with a mysterious past, where the group unwittingly summon an evil entity playing a terrifying game. Then, they faced some troubles and came out with a terrifying end.

== Cast ==
- Dee Wallace as Katherine
  - Tara Reid as Young Katherine
- Mischa Barton as Samantha
- Carly Schroeder as Laurie
- Chris Mulkey as Tomas
- Tiffany Shepis as Claire
