= Jonathan Price =

American composer

Jonathan Price was an American composer who is best known for his film scores to Ouija House and Necrosis, and for the opera ÆSOPERA. He died in January 2022 from glioblastoma multiforme, which is an inoperable brain tumor.

== Film ==
- Sammyville, Creative Light Entertainment (1999)
- Vampire Night, Cinematrix (2000)
- Rustin, Showtime (2001)
- Cyber Wars, New Line (2004)
- Necrosis, American World Pictures (2009)
- Girl Meets Boy, Screen Media Films (2013)
- Inoperable, ITN (2017)
- Ouija House, ITN (2018)
- Clown Motel, ITN (2019)

== Television ==
- American Dragon: Jake Long, Disney Channel, song "Hubba Hubba Hula" (lyrics by Jeff Goode) (2005)

== Opera ==
- The Lion & the Wood Nymph (libretto by the composer), American Fork, VocalWorks (2007)
- The Queen & the Dragon (libretto by Jan Michael Alejandro and the composer), North Hollywood, Secret Rose Theatre (2009)
- The Gift of the Magi (libretto by Jan Michael Alejandro and the composer after the eponymous short story by O. Henry), North Hollywood, Secret Rose Theatre (2009)
- ÆSOPERA (libretti by Jeff Goode, Jan Michael Alejandro, and the composer), Hollywood, SCLT (2013)

== Musicals ==
- Escape From Eldorado (book & co-lyrics by Jeff Goode), Bar Harbor, The Unusual Cabaret (1990)
- Rumpelstiltskin (book & co-lyrics by Jeff Goode), Bar Harbor, The Unusual Cabaret (1990)
- Dead Poets (book by Jeff Goode, lyrics from the poetry of Emily Dickinson, Walt Whitman and Edgar Allan Poe), Bar Harbor, The Unusual Cabaret (1990)
- Who Killed Cock Robin (book & lyrics by Jeff Goode), Bar Harbor, The Unusual Cabaret (1991)
- Lao Jiu (老九) (book by Kuo Pao Kun/adapted by Wu Xi & Zhang Xian, lyrics by XiaoHan, Wu Xi, & Yang Qian), Singapore, The Theatre Practice (2005)
- Wandering Willows (book and music by Jonathan Price, lyrics by Chana Wise), Burbank, SkyPilot Theatre Company (2011)
- Reel People (book and music by Jonathan Price, lyrics by Chana Wise), North Hollywood, SkyPilot Theatre Company (2012)
- Earthbound (book by Adam Hahn, lyrics by Chana Wise), North Hollywood, SkyPilot Theatre Company (2012)
- The Island (book and music by Jonathan Price, lyrics by Chana Wise), North Hollywood, SkyPilot Theatre Company (2013)

== Plays ==
- Alternate Endings: Apocalyptic Scenes & Monologues, Los Angeles, SkyPilot Theatre Company (2015)

== Discography ==
- Lily's Eyes, charisma, ABC Classics (2007)
- Classical Chill, various artists, ABC Classics (2008)
- Celtic Dreams, charisma, ABC Classics (2009)
- Film Music, various artists, Jonathan Price Music (2009)
- From the Emerald Isle: The Haunting Sounds of Ireland, various artists, ABC Classics (2010)
- Celtic Gold, various artists, ABC Classics (2011)
- Drive Time - Calming Classics, various artists, ABC Classics (2015)
- Classical Music for Mindfulness, various artists, ABC Classics (2016)
