= George Stults =

American actor (born 1975)

- Born: August 16, 1975 (age 50); Detroit, Michigan, U.S.
- Occupation: Actor
- Years active: 2001–Present
- Relatives: Geoff Stults (brother)

George Stults (born August 16, 1975) is an American actor. Stults is best known for his role as Kevin Kinkirk on the long-running family drama series 7th Heaven.

== Life and career ==
Stults was born in Detroit, Michigan, and grew up in Green Mountain Falls, Colorado. His younger brother is actor Geoff Stults. He received a wrestling scholarship at the University of Southern Colorado (now Colorado State University Pueblo), but he transferred to Whittier College in his junior year to be closer to his brother.

Stults was interested in acting and wrestling in high school. He got his career start as a model. A commercial agent spotted Stults eating lunch one day and stopped to give him her card and he then entered into the world of acting. At the time, Stults seriously considered joining the U.S. Navy. In February 2001, Stults made his first television appearance, outside of commercials, in a minor guest role on an episode of Will & Grace, and a short time later he made a guest appearance on a season 7 episode of Friends, The One With Joey's New Brain as Jessica Lockhart's daughter's boyfriend.

George auditioned for a role on 7th Heaven where his brother Geoff already had a recurring role as Mary Camden's love interest Ben Kinkirk. Originally auditioning for the role of a kid who forces people to drink, George was later cast in the role of Ben's older brother Kevin. Stults remained a regular cast member of 7th Heaven from season 6 until the final season 11, appearing in a total of 114 episodes.

Stults appeared in television and print ads for Liz Claiborne's fragrance "Bora Bora" in 2002. He has appeared in the "Spirit of a Boy, Wisdom of a Man" music video by Randy Travis. He appeared in K-Mart commercials with many other WB stars (2004). He starred in the film Night Skies in 2007. He starred in the 2010 psychological thriller Necrosis alongside James Kyson Lee and Tiffany.

In the mid-2010s, Stults began starring in television movies, mostly as the male lead in romantic Christmas-themed films.

== Filmography ==
=== Film ===
Year	Title	Role	Notes
2004	What Lies Above	Tyler	
2007	Night Skies	Matt	
2009	Super Capers: The Origins of Ed and the Missing Bullion	Police Officer #2	
2010	Necrosis	Matt	
2010	American Bandits	Jesse James	Video
2015	I'm Not Ready for Christmas	Drew Vincent	

=== Television ===
Year	Title	Role	Notes
2001	Will & Grace	Justin	Episode: "Brothers, a Love Story"
2001	Friends	Frederick	Episode: "The One with Joey's New Brain"
2001	Maybe It's Me		Episode: "The Romeo & Juliet Episode"
2002–2007	7th Heaven	Kevin Kinkirk	Main role
2009	Hydra	Tim Nolan	TV movie
2011	Borderline Murder	Michael	TV movie
2012	The Finder	Langston Sherman	Episode: "The Boy with the Bucket"
2015	Melissa & Joey	Doug (Mel's ex-boyfriend)	Season: 4 Episode: 14 "You Little Devil"
2015	Romantically Speaking	Jonathan	TV movie
2015	Killer Assistant	Robert Austin	TV movie
2016	Zoo	Reece Barns / Reece Barnes	Season: 2 Episode: 12 "Pangeaa"
2016	Christmas with the Andersons	Michael Anderson	TV movie
2017	Salamander	Nick Hobbs	TV movie
2018	Killer Caregiver	Greg Wilson	TV movie
2019	A Kiss on Candy Cane Lane	Mark Berry	TV movie
2019	Staging Christmas	Everett	TV movie
2020	Hope for the Holidays	Danny Petros	TV movie
2021	A New Lease on Christmas	Jake	TV movie
