= Hans (Frozen) =

Fictional character from Frozen

- Frozen character
- First appearance: Frozen (2013)
- Created by: Chris Buck; Jennifer Lee
- Voiced by: Santino Fontana
- Portrayed by: John Riddle (Frozen musical pre-Broadway); Ryan McCartan (Broadway theatre and tour); Oliver Ormson (West End theatre); Tyler Jacob Moore (Once Upon a Time)

In-universe information
- Title: Prince of the Southern Isles
- Occupation: Regent of Arendelle (briefly)
- Family: Twelve older brothers

Prince Hans of the Southern Isles is a fictional character from Walt Disney Animation Studios' animated film Frozen. He is voiced by American actor Santino Fontana. Hans is a prince who takes the role of suitor for Princess Anna of Arendelle. Handsome and charming, he quickly proposes marriage to Anna after bumping into her on the day of her sister Elsa's coronation and she immediately accepts.

Despite initially being presented as an honest and noble romantic partner for Anna, he is later revealed to be a deceptive and calculating villain. He was designed to overturn the concept of Prince Charming. As thirteenth in line, Hans is unable to inherit the throne of his own kingdom, so he concocts a scheme to usurp the throne of Arendelle. Hans is one of two leading male characters with whom Anna falls in love alongside Kristoff. He was created to represent romantic love, contrasting with Anna's more realistic relationship with Kristoff.

Hans' reveal as a villain has been the subject of mixed reception from critics. While the character's villainy has been praised as an example of toxic masculinity, the unexpected plot twist has been criticised for being upsetting and confusing for younger viewers and also for its lack of foreshadowing. Other critics have considered the character to be a positive shift in Disney's depiction of the traditional Disney prince, a subversion of Prince Charming, and a warning about the dangers of falling in love at first sight.

== Development ==
=== Origins and concept ===
The Walt Disney Company studio made their first attempts to adapt Hans Christian Andersen's fairytale The Snow Queen as early as 1943, when Walt Disney considered the possibility to produce a biography film of the author. However, the story and the characters proved to be too symbolic and implicit that they posed unsolvable problems to Disney and his animators. Later on, other Disney executives made efforts to translate this material to the big screen; however, these proposals were all shelved due to similar issues.

The final story for Frozen differs from early versions of the screenplay. Producer Peter Del Vecho said that in an early draft, Elsa was written as an evil villain while Anna was an innocent heroine. The final act made Hans the true villain and involved him triggering a huge avalanche that puts Arendelle in danger, resulting in Anna seeking Elsa's help. Del Vecho said that this concept had to be changed because it did not feel original or satisfactory. Co-director Chris Buck challenged the team by asking whether the story always needed to be resolved by a true love's kiss and whether it always had to be the man that rescues the female character.

=== Voice ===
Hans is voiced in Frozen and Frozen Fever by Santino Fontana. His involvement in Frozen started when Jamie Roberts, a casting director at Disney, was casting for Tangled and went to see him perform in Billy Elliot on Broadway. Although he was not cast in that film, Roberts called Fontana to be cast in Frozen.

=== Characterisation ===
Co-directors Jennifer Lee and Chris Buck said that in designing the male leads in Frozen they started by ensuring that the characters were interesting and had flaws. Art director Michael Giaimo said that in early versions of the script, Hans was not included and then later when he was introduced he was shown to be a villain much earlier in the story. Lee emphasised that although they tried not to include tropes in Frozen, they included the concept of Prince Charming as a way to flip it and emphasise that Hans is not the answer. She explained that it was a way to "look past happily ever after and explore it". Del Vecho said that the intention was not to mock the love at first sight trope, but show that getting to know someone first was sometimes better. He felt this gave the film more realism. Fontana said that Hans was an "awesome" character to play because although he is a "Disney prince", there is much more to his character and he goes through many twists in the film. In defense of the character, he said that just like Hans, no-one is really what they seem.

Hans differs from Kristoff by representing the romantic side of love, whereas Kristoff is the "messy" reality. Lee said that Anna finds Hans attractive at their first meeting because he appears awkward and nervous like her. Buck explained that, unlike her sister Elsa who is very controlled, Hans is spontaneous, which is also an attractive trait for Anna. Kristen Bell, said that Anna's first meeting with Hans is a "typical Disney moment" where the characters get too close physically and they have a crush on one another. Bell improvised Anna's reaction, in which she stumbles over her words and blurts out that Hans is "gorgeous".

Kristen Anderson-Lopez and Robert Lopez wrote the duet "Love Is an Open Door" for Anna and Hans. Anderson Lopez said that the song required a lot of work to explain why Anna would be so drawn to Hans after having only just met him. The aim of the song was to take the viewer on "the most fun first date". The songwriters nicknamed it "Golf 'n Stuff", in reference to a scene in The Karate Kid in which Daniel LaRusso and Ali Mills go to Golf ‘n Stuff and appear to be "made for each other". Anderson-Lopez also said that she dated someone like Hans, stating, "you had a great date and then you find yourself taking two years to get extricated from that! How does that happen? It happens because you have a magical date where you sing cheesy karaoke together!" Supervising animator Hyrum Osmond revealed that one scene in the song, where Hans is standing beneath a waterfall with eyes closed and raised arm, was a homage to a signature move by Donny Osmond, of whom Hyrum is a nephew.

=== Design ===
According to Osmond, the team had fun working with Hans' two personalities, as he transitions from a courtly charmer to a power-hungry villain. Describing Hans as a "handsome, dashing character", the aim was to make the audience fall in love with him and also with his potential relationship with Anna. The challenge was to make his reveal as a villain a real surprise. Animator Lino DiSalvo explained that Hans is a chameleon who adapts in order to make the other characters comfortable. Character designer Bill Schwab stated that it was challenging to incorporate Hans' personality into his design without revealing the full nature of his character to the audience. Hans was designed to have a princely appearance, thus his clothing takes inspiration from the traditional Norwegian Bunad jacket. Various features were added to give him a "heroic strength", including a black collar and lapels, epaulettes and an aguillette.

== Appearances ==
=== Frozen ===
Hans arrives in Arendelle on the day of Queen Elsa's coronation and accidentally runs into Princess Anna when she collides with his horse. Anna immediately falls for his charm and handsome appearance. After the coronation, Hans appears at the celebration party, and he and Anna share a dance. The two affirm their love for each other, Hans proposes marriage, and Anna hastily accepts. When they ask for Elsa's blessing, she coldly refuses and immediately ends the party. Anna and Hans then chase after Elsa as she flees after accidentally exposing her ice powers. Hans volunteers to accompany Anna up the North Mountain for her safety, but Anna insists that he stay behind to take care of Arendelle. When Anna's horse returns, riderless, Hans believes Anna is in danger and leads a rescue mission for Anna and a hunt for Elsa.

At Elsa's ice palace, Hans and his army battle the snow monster Marshmallow, but two guards make their way inside to take on Elsa. Hans defeats Marshmallow by slicing his leg off, sending him plunging into a gorge, and rushes inside to find Anna. Instead, they find Elsa who is close to killing the Duke's two guards. As one guard attempts to shoot her with his bolt, Hans diverts the blot upwards and shatters the hook on a massive chandelier, which crashes down and knocks Elsa unconscious. Elsa is imprisoned in Arendelle's dungeon. Hans decides to visit Elsa, asking her to put an end to the winter, but Elsa confesses that she has no idea how and asks to be released.

Anna returns to Arendelle and asks Hans for a kiss, believing is it the act of true love she needs to thaw her heart frozen by Elsa. Hans smirks and explains his plot to marry her, arrange an "accident" for Elsa, and become king of Arendelle through marriage. Anna tries to stop him, but she is far too weak. After informing her his next move is to kill Elsa and bring back Summer, Hans leaves Anna to die, locking the door and trapping her. Hans then returns to the Duke and the other dignitaries and tells them that Anna was killed by Elsa. He sentences Elsa to death for treason.

After Elsa escapes the dungeon, Hans chases after her onto the frozen fjords as a harsh blizzard consumes the kingdom. He eventually stumbles upon her and claims that Anna has died from Elsa freezing her heart. A devastated Elsa collapses, and while she is distracted, Hans pulls out his sword and prepares to strike her. Anna arrives and jumps in front of his sword, completely freezing solid just before Hans' blade strikes her and shatters, rendering him unconscious. When he awakens, Anna confronts Hans and punches him in the face and off the side of a ship. Humiliated and defeated, Hans is imprisoned on a ship heading back to the Southern Isles, set to receive a punishment from his older brothers.

=== Other appearances in animation ===
Hans makes a brief appearance near the end of Frozen Fever, where he is seen cleaning up horse manure in the Southern Isles as punishment for his actions against Arendelle.

Although he does not make a physical appearance in Frozen II, a memory of Hans appears when Elsa is exploring the magical river Ahtohallan.

Hans again cameos in Once Upon a Studio, where Elsa freezes him within his picture frame in to exclude him from the mass-gathering of Disney characters. Despite this, he is still seen therein at the end of the short.

=== Once Upon a Time ===
Hans is portrayed by Tyler Jacob Moore in the fourth season of Once Upon a Time. This version of the character is portrayed as much more explicitly and irredeemably malicious than his animated counterpart, invading Arendelle alongside his brothers (in contrast to his motivation and antagonistic relationship with his family in canon) after events equivalent to the film's and later actively attempting to murder both Anna and Kristoff in an alliance with Blackbeard.

=== Stage ===
In 2017, John Riddle portrayed Hans in the pre-Broadway production Frozen musical, which opened in Denver, ahead of its February opening in New York. Ryan McCartan was cast in the role of Hans for the Broadway production of the musical and joined in January 2020. He described Hans as the "bait-and-switch bad guy" and said he was able to bring his own interpretation to the character. In the UK, Oliver Ormson plays the role of Hans at the Theatre Royal, Drury Lane, London. He opined that the disintegration of Hans' character as the apparent hero "heightens the message of sisterhood and the importance of family and friends".

=== Publications ===
A novel by Elizabeth Rudnick titled A Frozen Heart explores the failed romance between Hans and Anna from the perspectives of the two characters.

=== Video games ===
Hans appears in Disney Magic Kingdoms as a playable character to unlock during limited time, being originally introduced in a Frozen-themed event as the boss enemy of the story.

Hans appears in Kingdom Hearts III as part of the Arendelle world. He is consumed by darkness and creates a wolf-like Heartless called Sköll, which serves as the world's final boss.

== Reception ==
=== Critical response ===
Sam Sewell-Peterson writing for The Film Magazine described Hans as "a duplicitous, generic British-accented baddie" but gave him points for using Anna's emotions to further his own ambitions. David Caballero of Collider thought that Hans is the ideal villain for a film about female empowerment and described him as "the epitome of toxic masculinity" and a "dastardly figure who might be the most punchable villain in Disney history". Stacey Grant of MTV wrote that despite being a "total dreamboat" he is also a "scumbag in disguise" and commented that his reply to Anna "If only there was someone out there who loved you" was utterly heartbreaking. Gina Dalfonzo from The Atlantic found his transformation from seemingly kind prince to sinister villain to be horrifying and needlessly upsetting for children and felt that it would have been gentler if this reveal happened earlier on in the film. Andy Hines also from The Atlantic disagreed and responded that Frozen delivers a teachable moment: "Regard the handsome charmer who sweeps you off your feet with great caution and skepticism", and considered it an opportunity to talk to young children about love and relationships. David Crow of Den of Geek noted that Hans had received criticism from some parents for embodying a kind adult with ulterior motives, but thought that this was exactly what made him a successful character, describing him as one of the most sinister Disney villains.

Cartoon Brew writer Ed Hooks disliked his late reveal as a "cold-blooded manipulative murderer" due to the lack of foreshadowing in the script and animation. He felt that Hans had the potential to blow the audience away but this is wasted because in every scene he is a "blank slate, a mental rag doll" and an underdeveloped character. MovieWeb's Gary Lockard opined that Hans' story arc makes no sense because his path to becoming king of Arendelle is easy and the plot offers several occasions that help him to achieve his goal. He noted that, Hans could have stood by while the Duke of Weazleton's henchman attacked Elsa with a crossbow or married Anna when she returned with a frozen heart to make himself king, knowing that Elsa was already out of the way. Despite not considering Hans to be a bad character and describing his charm as "refreshing", he thought Hans was poorly conceived because he "chooses to be a bad guy in a story that really doesn't require one". Jonathan V. Last writing for the Washington Examiner described Hans as a Jekyll and Hyde character and likened his reveal to the plot twists in the films of M. Night Shyamalan. He opined that Hans had been retconned by the writers into an evil villain for the purpose of swinging a sword at Elsa in the final act, making his villainy "accidental". The A.V. Club writer Cindy White considered Hans to be "a successfully stealthy villain" because his transformation is "instantaneous" and unpredictable. She also praised Fontana's performance, saying that he voices the character "note-perfectly".

Mic writer Natasha Noman thought that the characterisation of Hans teaches the viewer useful life lessons, particularly that desire for power results in unhappiness, that being manipulative results in the deprivation of meaningful human relationships, and that being ignored can transform someone into a sociopath. Melissa Leon from The Daily Beast said that Hans represents an acknowledgement that the concept of Prince Charming is "unrealistic and absurd" and even dangerous. Monika Bartzel writing for The Week felt that in depicting Hans as a subtle villain, Frozen makes a major step forward in throwing out the fantasy of Prince Charming that Disney has fostered by showing the implausibility of judging the worth of a romantic partner at first glance. Guy Bigel of The Guardian commented that Frozen marked a shift in Disney's own approach to the Disney prince by introducing Hans who is "noble-born and aesthetically similar to the earliest princes" but ultimately a villain and that this subversion relies on prior knowledge of earlier Disney princess movies. Ian Sandwell writing for Digital Spy thought that Frozen II lacked an essential component in the form of Hans, whose reveal he said caused "shocked gasps worldwide". He opined that nothing in the sequel came close to the character's plot twist in the original.

=== Impact ===
A decade after the release of Frozen, a study conducted by the University of East Anglia in 2023 showed that children had taken notice of Hans as a predatory villain and the film's warning about the concept of true love. Dr Sarah Godfrey, associate professor of film and television studies, said that adult Frozen fans reported that Hans was "instrumental in them becoming a bit more sceptical" about true love. She commented, "It's a really important message in the film and it's interesting that even if they didn't necessarily understand it in its nuance at the time, it's stayed with them".

The line "I love crazy", which is spoken by Hans during the musical sequence "Love Is an Open Door", inspired some dialogue in Disney's animated film Wish (2023) during a scene where the character Asha states "This is crazy" and the mushrooms in the forest reply, "We love crazy".
