= Santino Fontana =

American actor

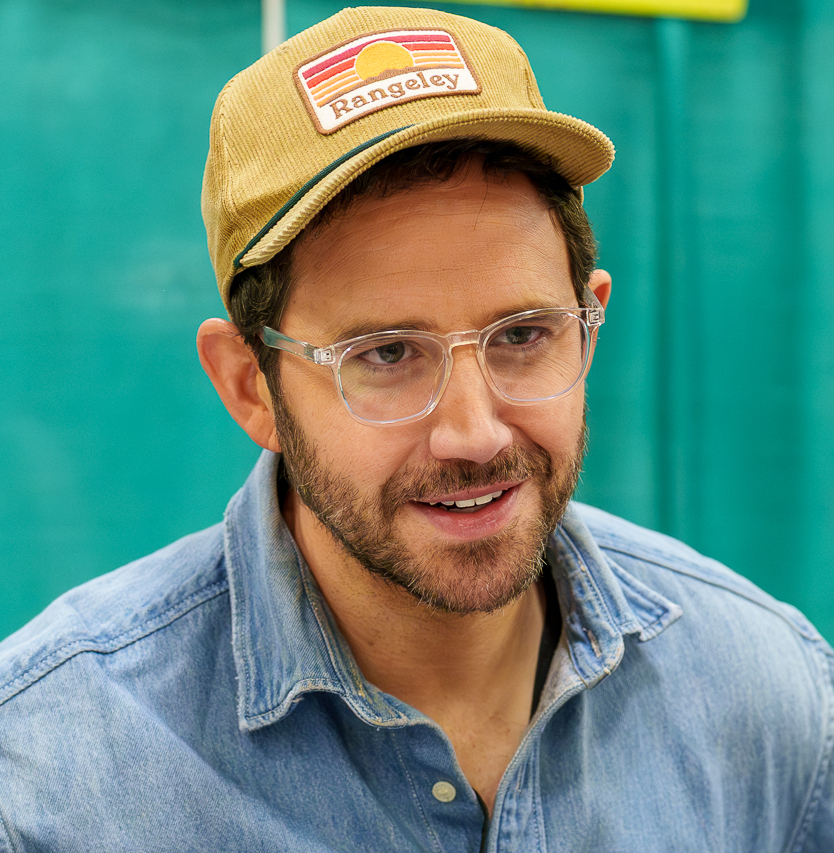
- Fontana in 2025
- Born: California, U.S.
- Education: University of Minnesota (BFA)
- Occupations: Actor; singer
- Years active: 2007–present
- Spouse: Jessica Hershberg (m. 2015)
- Children: 2

Santino Fontana is an American actor and singer. He began his career in 2006 playing Hamlet at the Guthrie Theater. He has received a Tony Award, two Drama Desk Awards, an Outer Critics Circle Award, Lucille Lortel Award, Obie Award, and Clarence Derwent Award. In 2019, Fontana won the Tony, Drama Desk, and Outer Critics Circle Awards for his lead performance as Michael Dorsey in the stage adaptation of Tootsie. In addition to his stage and TV work, Fontana voiced Prince Hans in Disney's 2013 animated film Frozen.

== Early life and education ==
Fontana was born in California. He grew up in Richland, WA and graduated from Richland High School in 2000. As a youth, he trained during the summers at Interlochen Center for the Arts. He is a graduate of the University of Minnesota/Guthrie Theater BFA Actor Training Program.

== Career ==
=== Broadway ===
Fontana has performed in a number of roles, including 10 Broadway credits. He has won a Tony Award, two Drama Desk Awards, an Outer Critics Circle Award, and was nominated for a Drama League Award.

Fontana made his Broadway debut in the 2007 revival of Sunday in the Park with George. Three years later, he was awarded the 2010 Drama Desk Award for Best Featured Actor in a Play for his work in Brighton Beach Memoirs. The Washington Post wrote, "Fontana is a find as Stanley, immensely likable and thoroughly convincing in the character's struggle between his selfish impulses and his fiscal obligations to the family."

In 2011, Fontana portrayed Algernon Moncrieff in the revival of The Importance of Being Earnest. Fontana received positive reviews, with Entertainment Weekly writing, "Kudos especially to the ever-versatile Fontana-best known on Broadway as the angry older brother in Billy Elliot- as the "ostentatiously eligible" Algernon, who gets the bulk of Wilde's ridiculously clever bons mots. Fontana does have a spot-on British accent and an immense likability- more important in my book."

Fontana received his first Tony nomination with his portrayal of Prince Topher in the 2013 production of Rodgers + Hammerstein's Cinderella opposite Laura Osnes. Roma Torre on NY1 praised his performance, stating, "Santino Fontana is not your typical Prince Charming, but this wonderfully versatile actor is loaded with so many unique charms, he is instantly winning." Fontana followed up this performance with the Tony-nominated Act One opposite Tony Shalhoub in 2014. Shalhoub and Fontana were dynamic in their performance together, with USA Today writing, "Fontana has brought a vigorous, probing humanity to a number of characters, and he gives Moss the right mix of earnest intelligence and restless ambition."

Fontana starred as Michael Dorsey / Dorothy Michaels in the stage musical adaptation of the film Tootsie, which premiered in Chicago at the Cadillac Palace Theatre from September 11 to October 14, 2018. The musical opened on Broadway on April 23, 2019, and closed on January 5, 2020. Direction was by Scott Ellis with music and lyrics by David Yazbek and book by Robert Horn. Fontana won the Tony Award for Best Actor in a Musical, Drama Desk Award and an Outer Critics Circle Award for his work. The New York Times' Jesse Green wrote that "Mr. Fontana sings beautifully, in a novel tenor-falsetto blend, and nails every joke," that "The persistence of Michael even in Dorothy drag, and later vice versa, is charmingly handled [by Mr. Fontana], helping us get past both Michael's obtuseness and Dorothy's unlikeliness," and that "[Mr. Fontana's] comic timing is impeccable."

Other credits include Hello Dolly! (2018 revival) opposite Bernadette Peters, A View from the Bridge (2010), and Billy Elliot the Musical (2008).

=== Off-Broadway/regional theatre ===
In 2006, Fontana starred as Hamlet in The Guthrie Theatre's performance of the Shakespearean classic before moving to New York City to appear as Matt in the Off-Broadway revival of The Fantasticks. He was one of the youngest Hamlets in American theatre history.

In 2011 he starred in Roundabout Theatre Company's Off-Broadway production of Sons of the Prophet to high acclaim. Fontana won a Lucille Lortel, Obie, and Outer Critics Circle Award and was nominated for a Drama Desk and Drama League Award. Scott Brown of Vulture commended his performance, stating, "Santino Fontana...firmly establishes himself as an indispensable stage star. The role he plays here, Joseph Douayhii- a young man dealing with an older man's pain, spiritually, physically psychologically, and perhaps psychosomatically- couldn't be more different than his buoyant, impish Algernon Moncrieff, yet both parts display Fontana's impressive gifts: his flawless timing, his jeweler's eye for the emotional cruxes of every exchange, his comfort with discomfort. He's always a step ahead of us, emotionally, as a great performer should be...Sons of the Prophet belongs to Fontana."

Fontana has performed in many productions at New York City Center's Encores! His first performance with Encores! was his portrayal of Niko in Zorba. In 2016 he starred as Eliot Rosewater in God Bless You, Mr. Rosewater. Pop Culturalist wrote of his performance, "The undeniable star of this show is Santino Fontana. Fontana is a reliably wonderful actor, but his performance as the good-hearted troubled Eliot Rosewater is masterful– quite simply, this is the best I've ever seen him." That same year he starred as John Adams in Encores! production of 1776. BroadwayWorld praised his performance, stating, "Santino Fontana's smart and empathetic performance is always winning."

=== Film and TV ===
Fontana is known for voicing Prince Hans in Frozen in 2013. He appeared in Sisters (2015) opposite Tina Fey and Amy Poehler and starred in Lost & Found in Cleveland (2023), currently in post-production. His independent film work includes the romantic comedy Off The Menu (2018), the psychological thriller Impossible Monsters (2019), Brenda & Billy and The Pothos Plant (2023), Stalking The Boogeyman (2023), and the comedy Papercop in 2018, for which he won the Best Actor Award at the Williamsburg International Independent Film Festival.

Fontana has appeared in many television productions to high acclaim. Fontana joined the cast of The CW romantic musical comedy-drama Crazy Ex-Girlfriend in 2015. On November 11, 2016, it was announced that Fontana was leaving the TV series after his one-year contract with The CW. The New Yorker stated that "Greg, played by the Broadway star Santino Fontana, is particularly appealing," with the AV Club adding "Fontana has solid timing (and great eyebrow waggling capabilities)" and "Santino Fontana, in particular, does excellent work.”

In 2016, Fontana starred opposite Jennifer Lopez in NBC's Shades of Blue. He played David Saperstein, a detective who is part of Wozniak's (Lopez) crew. The San Francisco Chronicle wrote, “In addition to Lopez, the best performances are turned in by Santino Fontana."

Fontana has appeared in other roles in The Marvelous Mrs. Maisel (2022) and Mozart in the Jungle (2014-2018), where he portrayed Wolfgang Amadeus Mozart. He has also appeared in Fosse/Verdon, The Good Wife, Nurse Jackie, BrainDead, and Royal Pains.

=== Concert work ===
Fontana performs routinely with orchestras and symphonies across the United States. He has appeared with the New York Philharmonic, National Symphony Orchestra, at the American Songbook Series at Lincoln Center, and Birdland Jazz Club, among many others. Fontana has made four appearances at the prestigious Carnegie Hall in New York City. When Fontana performed with the American Songbook Series at Lincoln Center, BroadwayWorld wrote, "Fortunately, thanks to artists like Fontana, America's rich musical past can be kept alive and well in the hearts of the young and old alike, and provide a source of inspiration for future generations to enjoy.”

In 2015, Fontana became the first guest artist to perform three times in the space of one year with the Tabernacle Choir on Temple Square, where he met the cast of Sesame Street.

=== Audiobooks ===
In addition to Fontana's extensive work as an actor, he is also heard on many notable audiobook recordings including Stephen King's The Institute, where he won an Audie Award for his performance. He is also heard on Caroline Kepnes’ You series, and The Hunger Games prequel Ballad of Songbirds And Snakes, among many others.

== Personal life ==
Fontana began dating actress Jessica Hershberg in mid-2011. The couple met backstage at the Birdland jazz club, where both were performing. They became engaged in September 2014 and married in September 2015. They have two daughters, born in 2019 and 2022.

== Theatre credits ==
=== Broadway ===
Year	Title	Role	Theater	Notes
2008	Sunday in the Park with George	A Soldier / Alex / Bather u/s Georges Seurat / George	Roundabout Theatre Company	Broadway debut
2008	Billy Elliot the Musical	Tony Elliot	Imperial Theatre	Originated role on Broadway
2009	Brighton Beach Memoirs and Broadway Bound	Stanley Jerome	Nederlander Theatre	Revival; Winner of Drama Desk Award for Outstanding Featured Actor in a Play
2010	A View from the Bridge	Rodolfo	Cort Theatre	Left the show in previews due to a performance-related injury and was replaced by his understudy, Morgan Spector
2011	The Importance of Being Earnest	Algernon Moncrieff	American Airlines Theatre	Revival
2013	Cinderella	Prince Topher	The Broadway Theatre	Nominated for Tony Award for Best Leading Actor in a Musical; Nominated for Outer Critics Circle Award for Outstanding Actor in a Musical
2014	Act One	Moss Hart	Vivian Beaumont Theatre	
2018	Hello, Dolly!	Cornelius Hackl	Shubert Theatre	Temporary replacement for Gavin Creel
2019	Tootsie	Michael Dorsey / Dorothy Michaels	Marquis Theatre	Originating role on Broadway; Winner of Tony Award for Best Leading Actor in a Musical; Winner of Drama Desk Award for Outstanding Actor in a Musical; Winner of Outer Critics Circle Award for Outstanding Actor in a Musical; Nominated for Drama League Award for Distinguished Performance
2023	Gutenberg! The Musical!	The Producer	James Earl Jones Theatre	One night only

=== Off-Broadway ===
Year	Title	Role	Theater	Notes
2006	The Fantasticks	Matt	Theater Center	
2011	Sons of the Prophet	Joseph Douaihy	Laura Pels Theatre	Winner of Lucille Lortel Award, Outstanding Lead Actor; Winner of Obie Award for Performance; Winner of ITBA Patrick Lee Award, Citation for Excellence in Individual Performance; Nominated for Drama Desk Award for Outstanding Actor In a Play; Nominated for Outer Critics Circle Award for Outstanding Actor in a Play
2012	The Game of Love	Anatol	York Theatre	
2014	Stalking the Bogeyman		New World Stages	Author of additional material
2015	Zorba	Nikos	Encores! New York City Center	
2016	God Bless You, Mr. Rosewater	Eliot Rosewater	Encores! New York City Center	Original Encores! cast recording
2016	1776	John Adams	Encores! New York City Center	
2022	A Man of No Importance	Father Ignatius Kenny	East 13th Street/CSC Theatre	Replacement
2023	The Goodbye Girl	Elliot Garfield	Theatre Row Building	
2023	I Can Get It for You Wholesale	Harry Bogen	Classic Stage Company	Nominated for Lucille Lortel Award for Outstanding Lead Performer in a Musical and Drama Desk Award for Outstanding Lead Performance in a Musical
2025	The Rink	Guy / Dino	Classic Stage Company	Concert
2026	Are You Now or Have You Ever Been	Performer	New York City Center Stage I	Revival

=== Regional ===
Year	Title	Role	Theater	Notes
	The Unbuilt City	Jonah	NY Stage & Film	
	Shakespeare's Lovers	Rich III/Launce/Touchstone	Guthrie Theater	
	The Winter's Tale	Autolycus/Polixenes	Guthrie Theater	
	Six	Massemo	Guthrie Theater	
	The American Clock	Lee	Guthrie Theater	
	New York's Leaving	Eggman, etc.	Sundance Theatre Lab	
2001	September 11 Project	Various	Chautauqua Theater Company	
	The Boys	Orson Welles	Guthrie Theater	
2003	Six Degrees of Separation	Doug	Guthrie Theater	
2003	On the Verge	Grover	Chautauqua Theater Company	
2003	Love's Labour's Lost	Berowne	Chautauqua Theater Company	
2004	A Christmas Carol	Young Jacob Marley, Squeeze	Guthrie Theater	
2004	Death of a Salesman	Bernard	Guthrie Theater	
2005	Most Wanted	Daddy-O, etc.	Sundance Theatre Lab	
2005	Perfect Harmony	Philip Fellowes V	Studio Tisch	Also Co-Writer
2005	As You Like It	Silvius	Guthrie Theater	
2006	Hamlet	Hamlet	Guthrie Theater	
2007	Hay Fever	Simon Bliss	Old Globe Theatre, San Diego	
2016	The Roar of the Greasepaint – The Smell of the Crowd		NY Stage & Film, Vassar, Roundabout Theatre Company	With new book by Fontana
2017	Man of La Mancha	Don Quixote / Miguel de Cervantes	Merkin Hall	Concert
2018	Tootsie	Michael Dorsey / Dorothy Michaels	Cadillac Palace Theatre	Pre-Broadway regional tryout
2022	Anyone Can Whistle	J. Bowden Hapgood	Carnegie Hall	Concert
2024	Follies	Buddy Plummer	Carnegie Hall	Concert
2025	Hello, Dolly!	Cornelius Hackl	Carnegie Hall	Concert

== Filmography ==
=== Film ===
Year	Title	Role	Notes
2011	Newsworthy	Mr. Kerry	Short film
2012	Nancy, Please	Charlie	
2013	Marion Knapp Doesn't Smile	Dominic Peters	Short film
2013	Frozen	Hans (voice)	
2014	Jack Ryan: Shadow Recruit	Running Banker	
2014	Fade to White	Damon	
2015	Frozen Fever	Hans (voice)	Short film
2015	Sisters	Mr. Geernt	
2018	The Limit of Wooded Country	Grant	Short film
2018	Off the Menu	Joel Flanagan	
2018	Papercop	Neil	Short film
2018	The Vanishing Princess	The First Soldier	
2019	Impossible Monsters	Dr. Rich Freeman	
2019	Frozen II	Hans (voice)	Archive footage
2020	The Devil All The Time	AM Radio DJ (voice)	
2022	Just One Kiss	Tony Romano	
2023	Once Upon a Studio	Hans (voice)	Short film; archive footage
2024	Lost & Found in Cleveland	Gary Lucarelli	

=== Television/web series ===
Year	Title	Role	Notes
2010	The Good Wife	Danny Willoughby	Episode: "Heart"
2011	Nurse Jackie	David	Episode: "Play Me"
2010–2014	Submissions Only	Aaron Miller	Main role (16 episodes)
2012	A Gifted Man	Gene Tipton	Episode: "In Case of Heart Failure"
2012	Royal Pains	Jason	Episode: "Dawn of the Med"
2012	Made in Jersey	ADA Van Pelt	Episode: "Ancient History"
2014	A Summer Celebration of Song	Himself	Television special
2014–2018	Mozart in the Jungle	Wolfgang Amadeus Mozart	4 episodes
2015	Keep Christmas With You	Himself	Television special
2015–2016	Crazy Ex-Girlfriend	Greg Serrano	Main role (22 episodes)
2016–2017	Shades of Blue	David Saperstein	9 episodes
2016	BrainDead	Kevin	Episode: "The Path to War Part One: The Gathering Political Storm"
2018	Singularity	Stan	Pilot
2019	Fosse/Verdon	James Henaghan	Episode: "Me and My Baby"
2020	Vampirina	Petru (voice)	Episode: "Phantom of the Auditorium/Meemoreek!"
2022	The Marvelous Mrs. Maisel	Boise	4 episodes
2022	Just One Kiss	Tony Romano	Television film
2024	Evil	Jakob	Episode: "How to Build a Chatbot"
2024	Grotesquerie	Dr. Witticomb	3 episodes

=== Video games ===
Year	Title	Voice role	Notes
2023	Disney Speedstorm	Hans (voice)	

== Discography ==
Year	Title	Music
2015	Keep Christmas with You	Mormon Tabernacle Choir & The Muppets from Sesame Street

== Audiobooks ==
Year	Title	Notes
2013	Wheelmen	
2014	You	
2015	The Children's Crusade	
2015	The Marriage of Opposites	
2015	The Bazaar of Bad Dreams	
2015	The Laws of Medicine	
2016	Glory Over Everything: Beyond the Kitchen House	
2016	The Perfect Pass	
2016	Hidden Bodies	
2017	The Deal of A Lifetime	
2018	Flight or Fright	
2019	Things My Son Needs to Know About the World	
2019	The Institute	
2020	The Ballad of Songbirds and Snakes	
2020	The What If Guy	
2020	Cliff Falls	
2020	The Red Badge of Courage	
2021	You Love Me	
2024	Middle of the Night	

== Awards and nominations ==
Year	Award	Category	Work	Result
2010	Drama Desk Award	Outstanding Actor in a Featured Role in a Play	Brighton Beach Memoirs	Won
2011	Clarence Derwent Awards	Most Promising Male Performer	The Importance of Being Earnest	Won
2012	Drama Desk Award	Outstanding Actor in a Leading Role in a Play	Sons of the Prophet	Nominated
2012	Drama League Award	Distinguished Performance	Sons of the Prophet	Nominated
2012	Outer Critics Circle Award	Outstanding Actor in a Leading Role in a Play	Sons of the Prophet	Nominated
2012	Obie Award	Performance	Sons of the Prophet	Won
2012	ITBA Patrick Lee Award	Citation for Excellence in Individual Performance	Sons of the Prophet	Won
2012	Lucille Lortel Award	Outstanding Lead Actor	Sons of the Prophet	Won
2013	Tony Award	Best Actor in a Leading Role in a Musical	Cinderella	Nominated
2013	Broadway.com Audience Awards	Favorite Lead Actor in a Musical	Cinderella	Nominated
2013	Broadway.com Audience Awards	Favorite Onstage Pair (with co-star Laura Osnes)	Cinderella	Won
2013	Outer Critics Circle Award	Outstanding Actor in a Leading Role in a Musical	Cinderella	Nominated
2014	Behind the Voice Actors Award	Best Vocal Ensemble in a Feature Film	Frozen	Won
2014	Behind the Voice Actors Award	Best Vocal Ensemble in a Feature Film (People's Choice)	Frozen	Won
2016	Poppy Awards	Best Actor in a Supporting Role in a Comedy	Crazy Ex-Girlfriend	Nominated
	Williamsburg Independent Film Festival	Best Actor in a Leading Role	Papercop	Won
2018	BroadwayWorld Chicago Awards	Best Actor in a Touring Production	Tootsie	Won
2019	Tony Award	Best Actor in a Leading Role in a Musical	Tootsie	Won
2019	Broadway.com Audience Awards	Favorite Leading Actor in a Musical	Tootsie	Nominated
2019	Drama Desk Award	Outstanding Actor in a Leading Role in a Musical	Tootsie	Won
2019	Drama League Award	Distinguished Performance	Tootsie	Nominated
2019	Outer Critics Circle Award	Outstanding Actor in a Leading Role in a Musical	Tootsie	Won
2020	Audie Award	Best Thriller/Suspense Audiobook	The Institute	Won
