= Frozen (2013 film) =

2013 film by Chris Buck and Jennifer Lee

- Theatrical release poster
- Directed by: Chris Buck; Jennifer Lee
- Screenplay by: Jennifer Lee
- Story by: Chris Buck; Jennifer Lee; Shane Morris
- Based on: "The Snow Queen" by Hans Christian Andersen
- Produced by: Peter Del Vecho
- Starring: Kristen Bell; Idina Menzel; Jonathan Groff; Josh Gad; Santino Fontana
- Cinematography: Scott Beattie (layout); Mohit Kallianpur (lighting)
- Edited by: Jeff Draheim
- Music by: Christophe Beck (score); Robert Lopez (songs); Kristen Anderson-Lopez (songs)
- Production company: Walt Disney Animation Studios
- Distributed by: Walt Disney Studios; Motion Pictures (Note: Distributed under the Walt Disney Pictures banner.)
- Release dates: November 19, 2013 (El Capitan Theatre); November 22, 2013 (United States)
- Running time: 102 minutes
- Country: United States
- Language: English
- Budget: $150 million
- Box office: $1.280 billion

Frozen is a 2013 American animated musical fantasy film produced by Walt Disney Animation Studios, loosely inspired by Hans Christian Andersen's 1844 fairy tale "The Snow Queen". Directed by Chris Buck and Jennifer Lee and written by Lee, it stars the voices of Kristen Bell, Idina Menzel, Jonathan Groff, Josh Gad, and Santino Fontana. The film follows Anna (Bell), the princess of Arendelle, who sets off on a journey with the iceman Kristoff (Groff), his reindeer Sven, and the snowman Olaf (Gad), to find her estranged sister Elsa (Menzel) after she accidentally traps their kingdom in eternal winter with her icy powers.

Frozen underwent several story treatments before it was commissioned in 2011. Christophe Beck was hired to compose the film's orchestral score, and Robert Lopez and Kristen Anderson-Lopez wrote the songs.

Following its world premiere at the El Capitan Theatre in Los Angeles on November 19, 2013, Frozen had its general theatrical release on November 27. It was praised for its visuals, screenplay, themes, music, and voice acting; some critics consider Frozen Disney's best animated film since the Disney Renaissance. The film grossed over $1.280 billion worldwide, becoming the highest-grossing animated film until the remake of The Lion King overtook this position in August 2019. It finished its theatrical run as the highest-grossing film of 2013 and the fifth-highest-grossing film of all time. The film's songs, characters, story, and appeal to a general audience led to it being dubbed a pop culture phenomenon.

The film's popularity spawned a franchise, which includes a short, Frozen Fever (2015), a featurette, Olaf's Frozen Adventure (2017), and two feature-length sequels—Frozen 2 (2019) and the upcoming Frozen 3 (2027). Among its accolades, it won Academy Awards for Best Animated Feature and Best Original Song with "Let It Go," the Golden Globe Award for Best Animated Feature Film, the BAFTA Award for Best Animated Film, and two Grammy Awards.

== Plot ==
Princess Elsa of Arendelle has naturally occurring magical powers, allowing her to create ice and snow. After she accidentally injures her younger sister Anna with her magic, their parents bring them to a colony of trolls led by Grand Pabbie. He heals Anna and erases her memories of Elsa's magic. The king and queen decide that until Elsa learns to control her powers, they will close the castle gates and isolate her. Years of isolation create a rift between the sisters and, when they are adolescents, their parents die in a shipwreck.

On Elsa's coronation day, the castle gates open to the public for the first time. Visiting dignitaries include the handsome Prince Hans of the Southern Isles, with whom Anna falls in love at first sight. Hans proposes to Anna, but Elsa objects to the marriage and lashes out, accidentally revealing her powers to the terrified court. Accused of witchcraft by the scheming Duke of Weselton, Elsa flees to the North Mountain and feels free for the first time. She builds an ice palace and decides to live a hermit's life, unaware that her magic has plunged Arendelle into an eternal winter.

Anna ventures out to find Elsa, leaving Hans in command. She meets an ice courier named Kristoff and his reindeer, Sven, and convinces them to bring her to the North Mountain. On the way they meet Olaf, a living snowman created by Elsa's magic, who agrees to guide them. At the ice palace, Anna tells Elsa about what has become of Arendelle. Elsa's fear makes her accidentally hit Anna with ice again, freezing her heart. Unknowing of this, Elsa creates a giant snow monster in desperation and casts Anna out of the castle to keep her safe.

With Anna slowly freezing to death, Kristoff takes her to the trolls for help. Grand Pabbie says that only "an act of true love" can thaw her heart. Kristoff and Olaf race Anna back to the castle so Hans can give her a true love's kiss. Meanwhile, Hans defeats the giant snow monster and imprisons Elsa, after a fight between her and the Duke of Weselton's bodyguards. Instead of kissing Anna, Hans reveals that he has been plotting to become ruler of Arendelle by marrying her and then killing Elsa, leaving Anna to freeze to death. The sisters escape, and Olaf helps Anna reunite with Kristoff, whom he has inferred is in love with Anna.

Hans confronts Elsa, saying that she has killed Anna. Elsa breaks down, which abruptly stops the extreme blizzard she recently created. Seeing Hans about to kill Elsa, Anna sacrifices her chance to be saved by Kristoff and steps between Elsa and Hans. She freezes solid, which devastates Elsa. As she hugs her sister, Anna slowly thaws; her heroism is "an act of true love". Realizing that love is the key to controlling her powers, Elsa ends the winter. Hans is arrested and exiled for treason and attempted assassination. Kristoff is appointed the royal ice deliverer, and he and Anna share a kiss. The sisters mend their relationship, and Elsa promises never to lock the castle gates again.

== Voice cast ==
A promotional image of the main characters from the film. From left to right: Elsa, Hans, Anna, Sven, Olaf, and Kristoff.

- Kristen Bell as Anna, a fearless and optimistic 18-year-old princess of Arendelle and Elsa's younger sister who is determined to save both her kingdom and her relationship with her sister.
  - Livvy Stubenrauch as 5-year-old Anna. Katie Lopez provided her singing voice.
  - Agatha Lee Monn as 9-year-old Anna.
- Idina Menzel as Elsa, also known as the Snow Queen, the 21-year-old queen of Arendelle and Anna's elder sister who possesses magical ice powers.
  - Eva Bella as 8-year-old Elsa
  - Spencer Lacey Ganus as 12-year-old Elsa
- Jonathan Groff as Kristoff, an iceman who is accompanied by a reindeer named Sven
  - Tyree Brown as 8-year-old Kristoff
- Josh Gad as Olaf, a sentient comic-relief snowman that Elsa and Anna created as children, who dreams of experiencing summer
- Santino Fontana as Hans, a prince from the Southern Isles who is a fraud and a traitor
- Alan Tudyk as the Duke of Weselton
- Ciarán Hinds as Grand Pabbie, the Troll King
- Chris Williams as Oaken, the owner of Wandering Oaken's Trading Post and Sauna
- Maia Wilson as Bulda, a troll and Kristoff's adoptive mother
- Paul Briggs as Marshmallow, a giant snow monster who guards Elsa's palace
- Maurice LaMarche as King Agnarr of Arendelle, Anna and Elsa's father
- Jennifer Lee as Queen Iduna of Arendelle, Anna and Elsa's mother

Non-speaking characters include Kristoff's reindeer companion Sven, horses, and wolves. Sven's grunts and snorts were provided by Frank Welker, who was not credited.

== Production ==
=== Background ===
Concept art from Disney's shelved hand-drawn film adaptation of The Snow Queen

Walt Disney Productions began exploring a possible live-action-animated biographical film of author and poet Hans Christian Andersen in late 1937, before the December premiere of its film Snow White and the Seven Dwarfs (the first feature-length, hand-drawn animated film). In March 1940, Walt Disney suggested a co-production to film producer Samuel Goldwyn in which Goldwyn's studio would shoot the live-action scenes of Andersen's life and Disney's studio would animate Andersen's fairy tales. After the United States entered World War II, Disney focused on wartime propaganda; this halted development of the Disney–Goldwyn project in 1942. Goldwyn produced the live-action film Hans Christian Andersen (1952), and Disney Animation shelved a number of unfinished animated projects (including The Snow Queen).

Hans Christian Andersen's original version of The Snow Queen is a pretty dark tale and it doesn't translate easily into a film. For us the breakthrough came when we tried to give really human qualities to the Snow Queen. When we decided to make the Snow Queen Elsa and our protagonist Anna sisters, that gave a way to relate to the characters in a way that conveyed what each was going through and that would relate for today's audiences. This film has a lot of complicated characters and complicated relationships in it. There are times when Elsa does villainous things but because you understand where it comes from, from this desire to defend herself, you can always relate to her. "Inspired by" means exactly that. There is snow and there is ice and there is a Queen, but other than that, we depart from it quite a bit. We do try to bring scope and the scale that you would expect but do it in a way that we can understand the characters and relate to them.

— Producer Peter Del Vecho on the difficulties of adapting The Snow Queen

Walt Disney Feature Animation began developing a new adaptation of The Snow Queen during the late 1990s, after the success of its Disney Renaissance-era films (1989–1999), but the project was scrapped in late 2002 when Glen Keane reportedly quit and worked on another project which became Tangled (2010). Before then, Harvey Fierstein pitched his version of the story to Disney executives but was turned down. Paul and Gaëtan Brizzi, Dick Zondag and Dave Goetz reportedly tried their hands at it, but failed. After a number of unsuccessful attempts from 2000 to 2002, Disney shelved the project again. During one of those attempts, Walt Disney Company chair and CEO Michael Eisner supported the project and suggested director John Lasseter at Pixar after the expected renewal of Pixar's contract with Disney. Negotiations between Pixar and Disney collapsed in January 2004, however, and the contract was not renewed. Eisner's successor Bob Iger negotiated Disney's purchase of Pixar in January 2006 for $7.4 billion, and Lasseter was promoted to chief creative officer of Pixar and Disney Animation.

=== Development ===
Development began in 2008, when Lasseter convinced Chris Buck (who co-directed the 1999 film Tarzan for the studio) to return to Walt Disney Animation Studios from Sony Pictures Animation, where he had co-directed the 2007 film Surf's Up. Buck pitched several ideas to Lasseter that September, one of which was The Snow Queen. Buck later said that his initial inspiration for The Snow Queen was not the Andersen fairy tale, but he wanted "to do something different on the definition of true love ... Disney had already done the 'kissed by a prince' thing, so [I] thought it was time for something new". While working with Disney on Toy Story in the 1990s, Lasseter was blown away by early concept art for The Snow Queen. Development began as Anna and the Snow Queen, and traditional animation was planned. Josh Gad said that he first became involved with the film at that early stage, when the plot was still relatively close to the original Andersen fairy tale and Megan Mullally was going to play Elsa. By early 2010, the project was in development hell when the studio again failed to find a way to make the story and the Snow Queen character work.

On December 22, 2011, following the success of Tangled, Disney announced a new title for the film – Frozen – and a release date of November 27, 2013. It was confirmed a month later that the film would be a computer-animated feature in stereoscopic 3D instead of the originally intended hand-drawn animation, due to complex elements in the script requiring strong visuals. Kristen Anderson-Lopez and Robert Lopez joined the project and began writing songs for Frozen in January 2012. It was announced on March 5 of that year that Buck would direct the film, with Lasseter and Peter Del Vecho producing.

One of the main challenges Buck and Del Vecho faced after Disney placed The Snow Queen into development again was the title character, who was a villain in their drafts. The studio traditionally screens animated films in development every twelve weeks, followed by holding lengthy "notes sessions" in which directors and screenwriters from different projects provide extensive "notes" about each other's work.

Buck and Del Vecho presented their storyboards to Lasseter, and the production team adjourned to a conference room to hear his thoughts about the project. Art director Michael Giaimo later called Lasseter the film's "game changer": "I remember John saying that the latest version of The Snow Queen story that Chris Buck and his team had come up with was fun, very light-hearted. But the characters didn't resonate. They aren't multi-faceted. Which is why John felt that audiences wouldn't really be able to connect with them."

The production team then addressed the film's problems, drafting several versions of The Snow Queen until the characters and story felt relevant. The first major breakthrough at that stage was the decision to rewrite the film's protagonist, Anna (who was based on Gerda in "The Snow Queen"), as Elsa's younger sibling for a family dynamic between the characters. This was unusual; a relationship between sisters is rarely a major plot element of American animated films, with the exception of Disney's Lilo & Stitch (2002). To explore the dynamics of such relationships, Disney Animation convened a "Sister Summit" at which women from the studio who grew up with sisters were asked to discuss those relationships.

=== Writing ===
Jennifer Lee, one of the writers of Wreck-It Ralph, was brought in as screenwriter in March 2012. Efforts by the previous screen- and songwriters had "imploded" before Lee was hired, which allowed the songwriters "to put a lot of [their] DNA" into the new script. The production team "essentially started over and ... had 17 months", which resulted in a very tight schedule; "a lot of choices had to be made fast".

Lee said that several core concepts were already in place, such as the film's "frozen heart" hook: "That was a concept and the phrase ... an act of true love will thaw a frozen heart." The ending involved true love in the sense of the emotional bond between siblings, not romance; "Anna was going to save Elsa. We didn't know how or why." She said that Disney Animation president Edwin Catmull told her early about the film's ending: "... you have to earn that ending. If you do[,] it will be great. If you don't, it will suck". However, the final version differed significantly from the earlier ones. Elsa was evil from the start in the original version, kidnapping Anna from her own wedding to freeze her heart and later descending on the town with an army of snowmen: "The whole second act was about Anna trying to get to Hans and to kiss him and then Elsa trying to stop her". Buck said that the original plot attempted to make Anna sympathetic by focusing on her frustration with being a "spare" in relation to the "heir". The revised plot focused on musical comedy, with less action and adventure.

A breakthrough was the song "Let It Go" by Lopez and Anderson-Lopez, which reimagined Elsa as a more complex, vulnerable, and sympathetic character. According to a story in The Daily Telegraph, the songwriters saw Elsa not as a villain but as "a scared girl struggling to control and come to terms with her gift". "Bobby and Kristen ... started talking about what would it feel like [to be Elsa]", Lee said. "And this concept of letting out who she is[,] that she's kept to herself for so long[,] and she's alone and free, but then the sadness of the fact [sic] that the last moment is she's alone". Del Vecho said that "Let It Go" changed Elsa into a person "ruled by fear and Anna was ruled by her own love of other people and her own drive"; this caused Lee to "rewrite the first act and then that rippled through the entire movie. So that was when we really found the movie and who these characters were".

Another breakthrough was developing the plot twist that Prince Hans, absent from the first drafts, would be revealed as the true villain near the end. Del Vecho said, "if we were going to make the ending so surprising[,] you had to believe at one point that Hans was the answer ... [when] he's not the answer, it's Kristoff ... [I]f you can get the audience to leap ahead and think they have figured it out[,] you can surprise them by turning it the other way". According to Lee, Hans was written as "sociopathic" and "twisted": "It was difficult to lay the foundation for Anna's belated turn to Kristoff without also making Hans' betrayal of Anna too predictable, in that the audience had to "feel ... her feeling something but not quite understanding it ... Because the minute it is [understood,] it deflated." In earlier drafts, Anna flirted with Kristoff at their first meeting; that was changed after Walt Disney Studios chair Alan Horn said that it would confuse and annoy viewers, since Anna was already engaged to Hans.

Lee had to work through developing Anna's personality; some of her colleagues felt that the character should be more dysfunctional and co-dependent. Lee disagreed, but it took her almost a year to articulate that "this is what Anna's journey is. No more than that. No less than that." She successfully argued for a simple coming-of-age story "where she goes from having a naive view of life and love – because she's lonely – to the most sophisticated and mature view of love, where she's capable of the ultimate love, which is sacrifice". Lee had to let go of ideas that she liked, such as a scene of Anna and Elsa's relationship as teenagers, because they needed to maintain the separation between the characters. To construct Anna and Elsa's relationship, Lee was inspired by her relationship with her older sister. She called her older sister "my Elsa" in a Los Angeles Times op-ed, and walked the red carpet with her at the 86th Academy Awards. Lee said, "[h]aving to ... lose each other and then rediscover each other as adults, that was a big part of my life".

The team changed Olaf from Elsa's obnoxious sidekick to Anna's comically-innocent one. Lee's initial response to the original "mean" version of Olaf was "Kill the f-ing snowman", and she found him "the hardest character to deal with". The problem of how Anna would save Elsa at the climax was solved by story artist John Ripa. At the meeting where Ripa pitched his take on the story, Lasseter said: "I've never seen anything like that before"; Ripa received a standing ovation. The team abandoned considerable detail from earlier drafts, such as a troll with a Brooklyn accent (to explain Elsa's magical powers) and a regent Lee hoped to cast comedian Louis C.K. as. These were cut because they contributed to a "much more complex story than really we felt like we could fit in this 90-minute film". As Del Vecho said, "the more we tried to explain things at the beginning, the more complicated it got".

With Lee's extensive involvement in the development process, she was promoted to co-director by studio heads Lasseter and Catmull in August 2012. Her promotion was announced that November, making her the first woman to direct a full-length animated film from Walt Disney Animation Studios. Lee later said that she was "really moved by a lot of what Chris had done" and they "shared a vision" of the story, having "very similar sensibilities".

The team thought they had "cracked" the film's story by November 2012 but according to Del Vecho, in late February 2013 it was realized that it still "wasn't working" and more rewriting was done from February through June of that year: "[W]e rewrote songs, we took out characters and changed everything, and suddenly the movie gelled. But that was close. In hindsight, piece of cake, but during, it was a big struggle." Anderson-Lopez joked that she and Lopez thought they could have ended up working as "birthday party clown[s]" if the final product "pull[ed] ... down" their careers: "[W]e were really writing up until the last minute". In June (five months before the announced release date) the songwriters got the film working when they composed "For the First Time in Forever", which, according to Lopez, "became the linchpin of the whole movie". Disney conducted test screenings that month of the partially completed film for two audiences (one of families and the other of adults) in Phoenix, Arizona, at which Lasseter and Catmull were present. Lee recalled that it was the moment when they realized they "had something, because the reaction was huge". Catmull told her afterwards, "You did it".

=== Casting ===
Kristen Bell was cast as the voice of Anna on March 5, 2012. The filmmakers listened to a series of vocal tracks Bell recorded when she was young in which she performed songs from The Little Mermaid, including "Part of Your World". Bell completed her Frozen recording sessions while she was pregnant and rerecorded some lines after her pregnancy, when her voice had deepened. She was called in to re-record dialogue for the film "probably 20 times", which is normal for lead roles in Disney animated films whose scripts are evolving. About her approach to the role of Anna, Bell said that she had "dreamed of being in a Disney animated film" since she was four years old; "I always loved Disney animation, but there was something about the females that was unattainable to me. Their posture was too good and they were too well-spoken, and I feel like I really made this girl much more relatable and weirder and scrappier and more excitable and awkward. I'm really proud of that."

[Frozen is] a bit of a feminist movie for Disney. I'm really proud of that. It has everything, but it's essentially about sisterhood. I think that these two women are competitive with one another, but always trying to protect each other – sisters are just so complicated. It's such a great relationship to have in movies, especially for young kids.

— Idina Menzel about Frozen

Idina Menzel, a Broadway veteran, was cast as Elsa. Menzel had auditioned for Tangled, but did not get the part. Tangled casting director Jamie Sparer Roberts kept a recording of Menzel's performance on her iPhone, however, and asked her to audition with Bell for Frozen. Before they were cast, Menzel and Bell impressed the directors and producers at an early table read; after reading the script aloud, they sang "Wind Beneath My Wings" as a duet (since no music had been composed yet). Bell suggested that idea when she visited Menzel at her California home to prepare for the table read. The songwriters were also present for the table read; Anderson-Lopez said that "Lasseter was in heaven" on hearing Menzel and Bell sing in harmony and said, "Kristen Bell and Idina Menzel have to be in the movie!" Lee said, "They sung [sic] it like sisters and what you mean to me. And there wasn't a dry eye in the house after they sang." Additional casting was announced between December 2012 and June 2013, including Jonathan Groff as Kristoff, Alan Tudyk as the Duke of Weselton, Santino Fontana as Prince Hans, and Josh Gad as Olaf.

=== Animation ===
Similar to Tangled, Frozen employed a unique artistic style by blending features of computer-generated imagery (CGI) and traditional hand-drawn animation. Buck knew that Giaimo was the best candidate to develop the style he had in mind (drawing from the best Disney hand-drawn films of the 1950s, the Disney Little Golden Books, and mid-century modern design), and persuaded him to return to Disney as Frozen's art director. Buck, Lasseter, and Giaimo were old friends who met at the California Institute of the Arts; Giaimo had been the art director for Disney's Pocahontas (1995), on which Buck had worked as a supervising animator.

To create the film's look, Giaimo began pre-production research by reading about Scandinavia and visiting the Danish-themed city of Solvang, California (near Los Angeles). He focused on Norway because "80 percent" of the visuals that appealed to him were from that country. Disney eventually sponsored three research field trips. Animators and special-effects specialists were sent to Jackson Hole, Wyoming, to experience walking, running, and falling in deep snow in a variety of attire, including long skirts (which men and women both tried on); lighting and arts teams visited Quebec City's Ice Hotel to study how light reflects and refracts on snow and ice. Giaimo and several artists then traveled to Norway to absorb its mountains, fjords, architecture, and culture. "We had a very short time schedule for this film, so our main focus was really to get the story right but we knew that John Lasseter is keen on truth in the material and creating a believable world, and again that doesn't mean it's a realistic world – but a believable one. It was important to see the scope and scale of Norway, and important for our animators to know what it's like", Del Vecho said. "There is a real feeling of Lawrence of Arabia scope and scale to this".

In 2012, while Giaimo and the animators and artists conducted preparatory research and developed the film's overall look, the production team was still struggling to develop a compelling script. That problem was not solved until November of that year, and the script would later require more revisions. As a result, the "most daunting" challenge facing the animation team was a schedule of less than 12 months to turn Lee's evolving shooting script into a film. Other films (like Pixar's Toy Story 2) had been completed on shorter schedules, but the short schedule meant "late nights, overtime, and stress". Lee estimated the size of Frozen's team at 600 to 650 people, "including around 70 lighting people[,] 70-plus animators", and 15 to 20 storyboard artists.

Del Vecho explained the organization of the film's animation team: "On this movie we do have character leads, supervising animators on specific characters. The animators themselves may work on multiple characters but it's always under one lead. I think it was different on Tangled, for example, but we chose to do it this way as we wanted one person to fully understand and develop their own character and then be able to impart that to the crew. Hyrum Osmond, the supervising animator on Olaf, is quiet but he has a funny, wacky personality so we knew he'd bring a lot of comedy to it; Anna's animator, Becky Bresee, it's her first time leading a character and we wanted her to lead Anna." Acting coach Warner Loughlin was brought in to help the animators understand the characters they were creating. To get the general feeling of each scene, some animators did their own acting. "I actually film myself acting the scene out, which I find very helpful", said animation supervisor Rebecca Wilson Bresee. This helped her discover elements that made a scene feel real and believable. Elsa's supervising animator was Wayne Unten, who requested that role because he was fascinated by the character's complexity. Unten carefully developed Elsa's facial expressions to bring out her fear, contrasted with Anna's fearlessness. He studied videos of Menzel's recording sessions, and animated Elsa's breathing to match Menzel's. Head of animation Lino DiSalvo said, "The goal for the film was to animate the most believable CG characters you've ever seen".

For the look and nature of the film's cinematography, Giaimo was influenced by Jack Cardiff's work on Black Narcissus (1947). He aimed for hyper-reality: "Because this is a movie with such scale and we have the Norwegian fjords to draw from, I really wanted to explore the depth. From a design perspective, since I was stressing the horizontal and vertical aspects, and what the fjords provide, it was perfect. We encased the sibling story in scale." Ted D. McCord's work on The Sound of Music was another influence on Giaimo. It was his idea that Frozen should be produced in CinemaScope, which was approved by Lasseter. This made Frozen the first animated film completely produced in CinemaScope since 2000's Titan A.E.. Giaimo wanted to ensure that Norway's fjords, architecture and rosemaling folk art, were central in designing the environment of Arendelle. With a background in traditional animation, he said that the art-design environment represents a unity of character and environment and he originally wanted to incorporate saturated colors (typically ill-advised in computer animation). For further authenticity, a live reindeer named Sage was brought into the studio for the animators to study its movement and mannerisms for the character of Sven.

Another issue Giaimo insisted on addressing was costumes, since he "knew from the start" that Frozen would be a "costume film". To realize that vision, he brought in character designer Jean Gillmore as a dedicated "costume designer". Traditional animation integrates costume and character design and treats clothing as part of the characters, but computer-generated animation regards costume as a quasi-separate entity with its own properties and behaviors; Frozen required unprecedented detail of minutiae such as fabrics, buttons, trim, and stitching. Gillmore said that her "general approach was to meld the historic silhouettes of 1840 Western Europe (give or take), with the shapes and garment relationships and details of folk costume in early Norway, circa 19th century". This meant using primarily wool fabric with accents of velvet, linen, and silk. During production, Giaimo and Gillmore "ran around" supplying departments with real-world samples to use as references; they drew on the studio's in-house library of fabric samples and Walt Disney Parks and Resorts' costume division in Fullerton, California. The film's "look development artists" (the Disney job title for texture artists) created digitally painted simulations of surfaces; other departments dealt with movement, rigging and weight, and thickness and lighting of textile animation.

The film's English title was changed from The Snow Queen to Frozen, a decision that was compared to Tangled. Peter Del Vecho said that "the title Frozen came up independently of the title Tangled. It's because, to us, it represents the movie. Frozen plays on the level of ice and snow but also the frozen relationship, the frozen heart that has to be thawed. We don't think of comparisons between Tangled and Frozen, though." He also mentioned that the film will still retain its original title, The Snow Queen, in some countries: "because that just resonated stronger in some countries than Frozen. Maybe there's a richness to The Snow Queen in the country's heritage and they just wanted to emphasize that."

=== Technological development ===
The studio developed several new tools to generate realistic and believable shots, particularly the heavy and deep snow and its effect on the characters. Disney wanted an "all-encompassing", organic tool to provide snow effects which did not require switching between different methods. Several Disney artists and special-effects personnel traveled to Wyoming to experience walking through deep snow. California Institute of Technology professor Kenneth Libbrecht was invited to instruct the effects group on how snow and ice form, and why snowflakes are unique. Using this knowledge, the effects group created a snowflake generator that allowed them to randomly create 2,000 unique snowflake shapes for the film.

Another challenge for the studio was to deliver shots of heavy and deep snow that interacted believably with the characters and had a realistic, sticky quality. According to principal software engineer Andrew Selle, "[Snow]'s not really a fluid. It's not really a solid. It breaks apart. It can be compressed into snowballs. All of these different effects are very difficult to capture simultaneously." To achieve this, software engineers used advanced mathematics (the material point method) and physics (with assistance from mathematics researchers at the University of California, Los Angeles) to create Matterhorn, a snow-simulator software application. The tool was capable of depicting realistic snow in a virtual environment and was used in at least 43 scenes in the film, including several key scenes. Software engineer Alexey Stomakhin called snow "an important character in the film", and it received special attention from the filmmakers. "When you stretch it, snow will break into chunks. Since snow doesn't have any connections, it doesn't have a mesh, it can break very easily. So that was an important property we took advantage of", explained Selle. "There you see [Kristoff] walking through and see his footprints breaking the snow into little pieces and chunk up and you see [Anna] being pulled out and the snow having packed together and broken into pieces. It's very organic how that happens. You don't see that they're pieces already – you see the snow as one thing and then breaking up." The tool was particularly useful in scenes with characters walking through deep snow, ensuring that the snow reacted naturally to each step.

Other tools designed to help artists with complicated effects included Spaces (which allowed Olaf's deconstructible parts to be moved around and rebuilt), Flourish (which allowed extra movement, such as leaves and twigs, to be art-directed), Snow Batcher (which helped preview the final look of the snow, especially when characters walked through it) and Tonic, which enabled artists to sculpt their characters' hair. Tonic also helped animate fur and hair such as Elsa's hair, which contains 420,000 computer-generated strands; the average human has 100,000 strands of hair. Frozen has 312 character rigs and 245 cloth costume rigs, far more than other Disney films to date. Fifty effects and lighting artists worked together on technology to create "one single shot" in which Elsa builds her ice palace. It required 30 hours to render each frame, with 4,000 computers rendering one frame at a time.

In addition to 3D effects, the filmmakers used 2D artwork and drawings for specific elements and scenes which included Elsa's magic and snow sculptures and freezing fountains and floors. The effects group created a "capture stage" where the entire world of Frozen was displayed on monitors which can be "filmed" on special cameras to create a three-dimensional scene. "We can take this virtual set that's mimicking all of my actions and put it into any one of our scenes in the film", said technology manager Evan Goldberg.

Frozen was the final film from Walt Disney Animation Studios that used Pixar RenderMan for rendering. The studio switched to Hyperion, its new rendering software, with Big Hero 6.

=== Scandinavian and Sámi inspiration ===
The setting is the fictional kingdom of Arendelle, which was based on Norway, and the film was influenced by Scandinavian culture. Several locations in Arendelle are inspired by real-life landmarks in Norway, including the Akershus Fortress in Oslo, the Nidaros Cathedral in Trondheim, and Bryggen in Bergen. A number of other Scandinavian cultural elements are also included in the film, such as stave churches, trolls, Viking ships, a hot spring, Fjord horses, clothes, and foods such as lutefisk. A maypole is also present in the film, and runes briefly appear in a book which Anna and Elsa's father opens to learn where the trolls live. A scene where two men argue over whether to stack firewood bark-up or bark-down refers to a perennial Norwegian debate about properly stacking firewood. The film has several elements of Sámi culture, such as the use of reindeer for transportation and the equipment used to control them, clothing styles (the outfits of the ice cutters), and parts of the musical score. Decorations, such as those on the castle pillars and Kristoff's sled, are inspired by Sámi duodji decorations. Disney's team visited Rørosrein, a Sámi family-owned company in the town of Plassja that produces reindeer meat and arranges tourist events. Arendelle was inspired by Nærøyfjord, a branch of Norway's longest fjord (Sognefjorden), which has been listed as a UNESCO World Heritage Site; an Oslo castle with hand-painted patterns on all four walls inspired the kingdom's castle interior.

The filmmakers' trip to Norway provided information for the animators to design an aesthetic in terms of color, light, and atmosphere. According to Giaimo, they acquired three important factors from the Norway research trip: the fjords and their massive, vertical rock formations, the setting for the secluded kingdom of Arendelle; the medieval stave churches whose rustic triangular rooflines and shingles inspired the castle compound; and rosemaling folk art, whose distinctive paneling and patterns informed the film's architecture, decor, and costumes.

=== Music and sound design ===
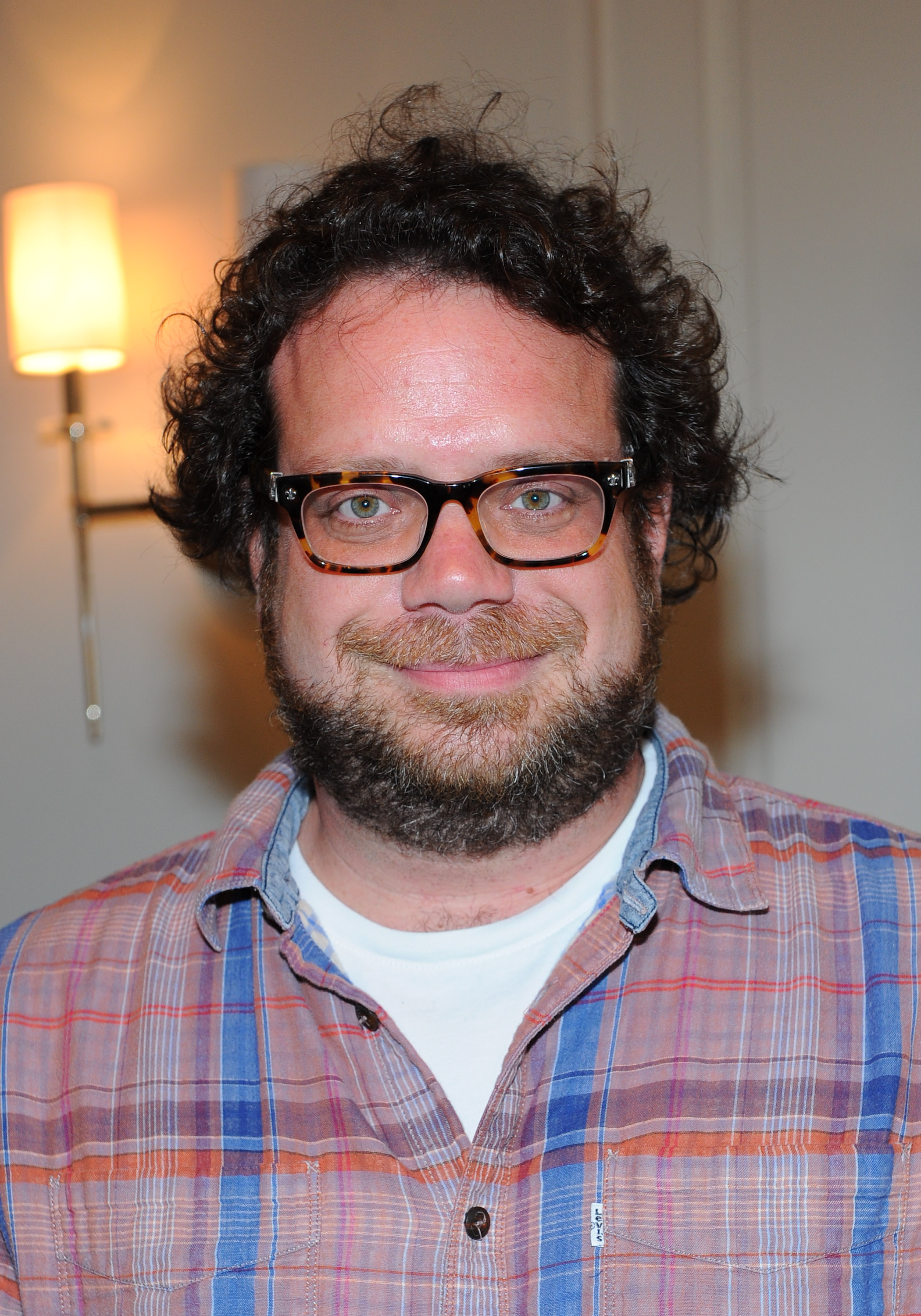
Christophe Beck composed the film's score.

The songs for Frozen were written by the husband-and-wife team of Robert Lopez and Kristen Anderson-Lopez, both of whom had worked with Disney Animation on Winnie the Pooh (2011) (also produced by Del Vecho, who hired them for Frozen) and with Disney Parks on Finding Nemo – The Musical (2007). Lopez first heard Disney Animation's pitch in Los Angeles while he was working on The Book of Mormon; Disney's production team traveled to New York City to pitch the film in person to Anderson-Lopez, who was raising the couple's two young daughters. Lopez believes that Disney was particularly interested in his wife's story talent. The decision was easy: "Whenever Disney asks if you want to do a fairy tale musical, you say yes."

About 23 minutes of the film are dedicated to their musical numbers. Because they live in New York City, collaborating with the production team in Burbank required two-hour-long transcontinental videoconferences nearly every weekday for about 14 months. They recorded a demo of each song in their home studio, with both singing and Lopez accompanying on piano, and emailed it to Burbank for discussion at the next videoconference. Lopez and Anderson-Lopez were aware of the fact that their work would be compared to that of Alan Menken and Howard Ashman from the Disney Renaissance era and, when they felt lost, they asked "What would Ashman do?" They wrote 25 songs for the film, and eight were included in the final version. One song ("For the First Time in Forever") had a reprise, and another ("Let It Go") was covered by Demi Lovato over the final credits for a total of ten songs. Seven of the 17 that did not make it were later released on the deluxe-edition soundtrack.

Christophe Beck was hired to score the film in February 2013 after his work on Paperman, a Disney animated short film released the year before Frozen. It was announced on September 14, 2013, that Sámi musician Frode Fjellheim's "Eatnemen Vuelie" would be the film's opening song, with elements of joik (a traditional Sámi singing style). The music producers recruited Norwegian linguist and composer Christine Hals to assist with the lyrics for an Old Norse song written for Elsa's coronation, and traveled to Trondheim to record the Cantus choir for a piece inspired by traditional Sámi music.

Under the supervision of sound engineer David Boucher, the lead cast members began recording the film's vocal tracks in October 2012 at the Sunset Sound recording studio in Hollywood before the songs were orchestrated; they only heard Lopez's demo piano track in their headphones as they sang. Most of the dialogue was recorded at the Roy E. Disney Animation Building in Burbank under the supervision of original dialogue mixer Gabriel Guy, who also mixed the film's sound effects. Some dialogue was recorded after recording songs at Sunset Sound and Capitol Studios; for scenes with Anna and Elsa, both studios had vocal isolation booths where Menzel and Bell could read dialogue in line-of-sight with one another (avoiding "bleedthrough" between their respective tracks). Additional dialogue was recorded at an ADR facility on the Walt Disney Studios lot in Burbank (across the street from the Disney Animation building) and at the Soundtrack Group's New York studio, since the production team had to work around the schedules of the film's New York-based cast members such as Fontana. Lopez and Anderson-Lopez's piano-vocal scores for the songs and the vocal tracks were sent to Salem, Oregon-based Dave Metzger for arrangement and orchestration, and Metzger orchestrated a significant portion of Beck's score.

For the orchestral score, Beck paid homage to the Norway- and Sápmi-inspired setting by employing regional instruments (such as the bukkehorn) and traditional vocal techniques such as kulning. Beck worked with Lopez and Anderson-Lopez on incorporating their songs into arrangements of the score, and the trio's goal "was to create a cohesive musical journey from beginning to end". Beck's scoring mixer, Casey Stone (who also supervised the recording of the score), worked with Boucher to align their microphones for seamless transitions between the songs and score despite their separate recording. The final orchestrations of songs and score were recorded at the Eastwood Scoring Stage on the Warner Bros. Pictures studio lot in Burbank by an 80-piece orchestra with 32 vocalists, including Norwegian Christine Hals. Hals performed kulning for Beck to use it in the score when Elsa misuses her magical powers. Boucher supervised the recording of Anderson-Lopez and Lopez's songs from July 22 to 24, 2013, and Stone supervised the recording of Beck's score on September 3–6 and 9–10. Boucher mixed the songs at the Eastwood stage, while Stone mixed the score at Beck's studio in Santa Monica, California.

Director Jennifer Lee said that sound played a large part of making the film "visceral" and "transported": "In letting it tell the story emotionally, the sound of the ice when it's at its most dangerous just makes you shudder." The complete silence at the climax of the film (right after Anna freezes) was Lasseter's idea, one he "really wanted". In that scene, the ambient sound that would normally be there was removed to make it feel unusual; Lee said, "[T]hat was a moment where we wanted everything to feel suspended".

To obtain certain snow and ice sound effects, sound designer Odin Benitez traveled to Mammoth Mountain, California, to record them at a frozen lake. The Foley work for the film was recorded on the Foley stage on the Warner Bros. Pictures lot by a Warner Bros. crew. The Foley artists received daily deliveries of 50 pounds (22.6 kg) of snow and ice to help them record all the necessary snow and ice sounds. Because the film's visuals were finalized so late, five separate versions of nearly every footstep on snow were recorded (corresponding to five different types of snow); one was selected during mixing to match the snow as rendered in the final version of each scene. One issue the production team was "particular" about was the sound of Elsa's footsteps in the ice palace, which required eight attempts (including wine glasses and metal knives on ice); they ended up using a mix of three sounds. Although the vocals, music, sound effects, and almost all the dialogue were all recorded elsewhere, the final re-recording mix in Dolby Atmos format was performed at the Disney lot by Casey E. Fluhr of Disney Digital Studio Services.

=== Localization ===
Like other Disney media products which are localized by Disney Character Voices International, Frozen was translated and dubbed into 41 languages; The Lion King had been localized into 15. Finding sopranos capable of matching Menzel's warm vocal tone and three-octave vocal range in their native languages was a challenge. Rick Dempsey, the unit's senior executive, called the process of translating the film "exceptionally challenging": "It's a difficult juggling act to get the right intent of the lyrics and also have it match rhythmically to the music. And then you have to go back and adjust for lip sync! [It] ... requires a lot of patience and precision." Lopez explained that they were told by Disney to remove complex wordplay and puns from their songs to ensure that the film was easily translatable and had universally appealing lyrics. In casting the dubbed versions, Disney required native speakers in to "ensure that the film feels 'local'". Bell and Menzel's voices were the "blueprint" in casting, with efforts to match the voices "as much as possible", and about 200 singers auditioned to fill the 41 slots for Elsa. Elsa's singing and speaking roles were cast separately for almost 15 dubbed versions, since not all the vocalists could act the part they were singing. After casting the other roles in all 41 languages, the international cast included over 900 people who voiced their roles in about 1,300 recording sessions. The Italian version of the film received an award for best foreign dubbing worldwide.

Frozen worldwide
Language	Title	Translation
Arabic	ملكة الثلج (Malikat Alththalj)	The Snow Queen
Bulgarian	Замръзналото кралство (Zamr'aznaloto kralstvo)	Frozen Kingdom
Cantonese Chinese	魔雪奇緣 (Mo syut kei yun)	Enchanted Snow Tales
Catalan	Frozen: El regne del gel	Frozen: The Kingdom of Ice
Croatian	Snježno kraljevstvo	Snow Kingdom
Czech	Ledové království	Ice Kingdom
Danish	Frost	Frost
Dutch	Frozen	
Estonian	Lumekuninganna ja igavene talv	The Snow Queen and the Eternal Winter
Finnish	Frozen – huurteinen seikkailu	Frozen – Frosty Adventure
Flemish	Frozen	
French	La Reine des neiges	The Snow Queen
German	Die Eiskönigin – Völlig unverfroren	The Ice Queen – Unfrozen
Greek	Ψυχρά κι Ανάποδα (Psychrá ki Anápoda)	Cold and Upside
Hebrew	לשבור את הקרח (Lishbor et ha'Kerakh)	Break the Ice
Hindi	फ्रोज़न (Phrozan)	Frozen
Hungarian	Jégvarázs	Ice Magic
Icelandic	Frosinn	Frozen
Indonesian	Frozen – Anna dan Ratu Salju	Frozen – Anna and the Snow Queen
Italian	Frozen – Il regno di ghiaccio	Frozen – The Ice Kingdom
Japanese	アナと雪の女王 (Ana to Yuki no Joō)	Anna and the Snow Queen
Kazakh	Мұзды өлке (Мuzdy olke)	Frozen Kingdom
Korean	겨울왕국 (Gyeoul Wangguk)	The Kingdom of Winter
Latvian	Ledus sirds	Ice Heart
Lithuanian	Ledo šalis	Ice Country
Malay	Anna dan Permaisuri Salji	Anna and the Snow Queen
Mandarin Chinese	冰雪奇缘 (Bīng xuě qí yuán)	Magical Tales of Ice and Snow
Norwegian	Frost	Frost
Polish	Kraina lodu	Land of Ice
Portuguese (Brazil)	Frozen – Uma Aventura Congelante	Frozen – A Freezing Adventure
Portuguese (Europe)	Frozen – O Reino do Gelo	Frozen – The Kingdom of Ice
Romanian	Regatul de gheață	Kingdom of Ice
Russian	Холодное сердце (Kholodnoe syertse)	Cold Heart
Serbian	Залеђено краљевство (Zaleđeno kraljevstvo)	Frozen Kingdom
Slovak	Ľadové kráľovstvo	Ice Kingdom
Slovene	Ledeno Kraljestvo	Icy Kingdom
Spanish (Europe)	Frozen: El reino del hielo	Frozen: The Kingdom of Ice
Spanish (Latin America)	Frozen: Una aventura congelada	Frozen: A Frozen Adventure
Swedish	Frost	Frost
Thai	Frozen – ผจญภัยแดนคำสาปราชินีหิมะ (Phachonphai Daen Khamsap Rachini Hima)	Frozen – Adventure in the Snow Queen's Cursed Land
Turkish	Karlar Ülkesi	Snow Country
Ukrainian	Крижане серце (Kryzhane sertse)	Icy Heart
Vietnamese	Nữ hoàng băng giá	Ice Queen

Some local TV stations and independent studios have created unofficial dubs in Albanian, Arabic (TV), Karachay-Balkar, Persian and Tagalog.

== Release ==
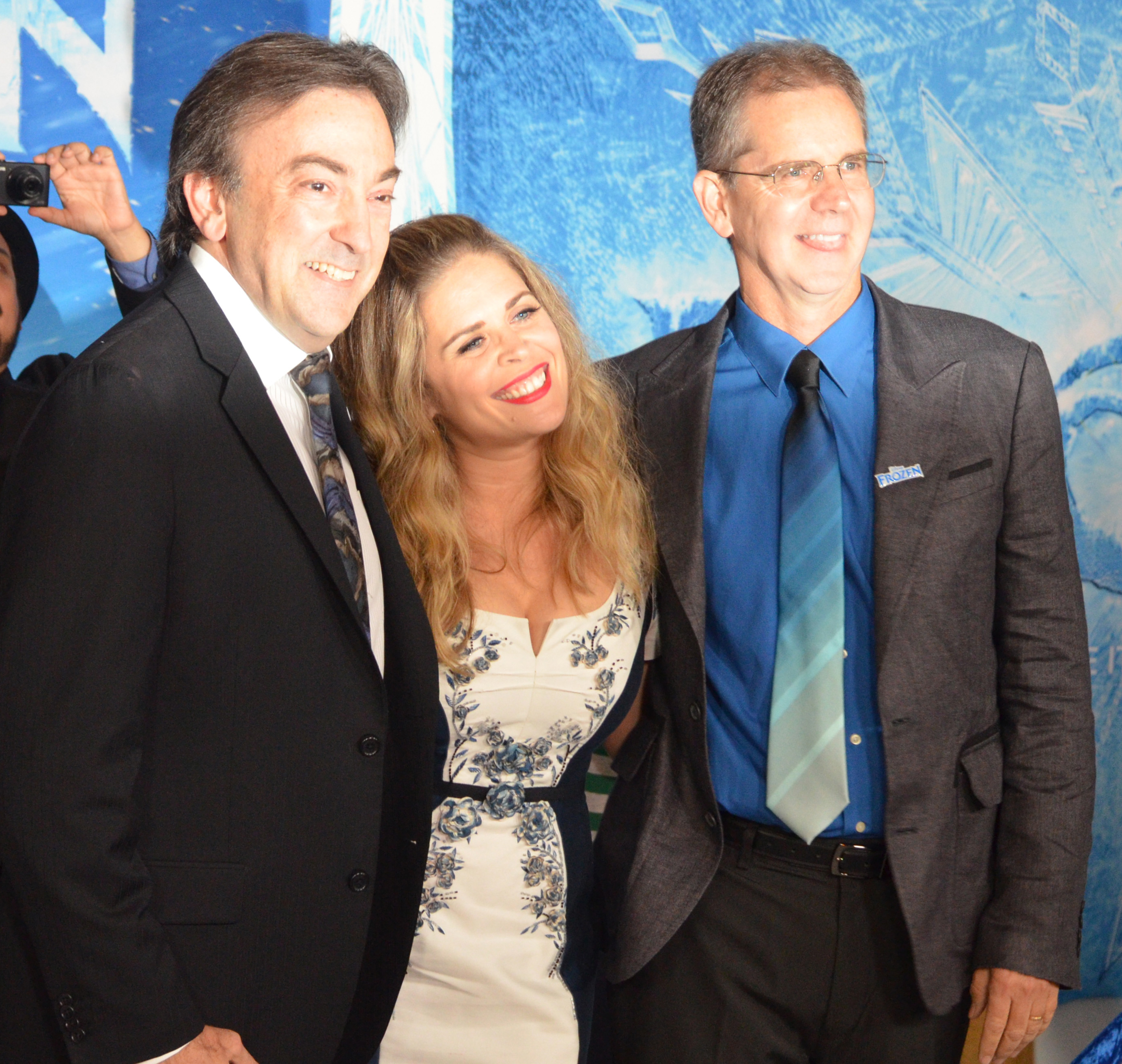
Producer Peter Del Vecho, writer and director Jennifer Lee, and director Chris Buck at the film's premiere at the El Capitan Theatre in Hollywood

Frozen was released theatrically in the United States on November 27, 2013, with Get a Horse! (a new Mickey Mouse animated short film). The film premiered at the El Capitan Theatre in Hollywood on November 19, 2013, with a five-day limited release there beginning on November 22 before its wide release.

Before the release, Lopez and Anderson-Lopez's "Let It Go" and "In Summer" were previewed at the 2013 D23 Expo; Idina Menzel performed "Let It Go" live. A teaser trailer was released on June 18, 2013, followed by the trailer on September 26, 2013. Frozen was promoted at several Disney theme parks, including Disneyland's Fantasyland, Disney California Adventure's World of Color, Epcot's Norway pavilion, and Disneyland Paris' Disney Dreams! show; Disneyland and Epcot had meet-and-greet sessions with Anna and Elsa. On November 6, 2013, Disney Consumer Products released a line of toys and other film-related merchandise at the Disney Store and other retailers.

On January 31, 2014, a sing-along version of Frozen was released in 2,057 theaters in the United States. It had on-screen lyrics, and viewers were invited to follow the bouncing snowflake and sing along with songs from the film. After its wide release in Japan on March 14, 2014, a similar sing-along version of Frozen was released on April 26. In Japanese-dubbed versions, Japanese lyrics of the songs appeared onscreen for audiences to sing along with the characters. A sing-along version of the film was released in the United Kingdom on November 28, 2014.

=== Home media ===
Walt Disney Studios Home Entertainment released Frozen for digital download on February 25, 2014, and on Blu-ray and DVD on March 18. Physical copies have behind-the-scenes featurettes, deleted scenes, the film's teaser trailer, a "Let It Go" music video, and Get a Horse! After an August 12, 2014, announcement, a sing-along reissue of Frozen was released on DVD and digital download on November 18 of that year. A 4K Ultra HD Blu-ray version was released in 2019.

Frozen sold 3.2 million units on its Blu-ray and DVD release day, one of the decade's biggest home-video sellers and Amazon's best-selling children's disc of all time. The film's digital-download version was the fastest-selling digital release of all time. Frozen finished its first week at number one in unit sales in the United States, selling more than three times as many units as the other 19 titles in Nielsen's sales chart combined. The film sold 3,969,270 Blu-ray units ($79,266,322) during its first week, half of its opening home-media sales. By May 4, 2014, it had topped the U.S. home-video sales charts for six of its seven weeks of release. In the United Kingdom, Frozen debuted at number one in Blu-ray and DVD sales on the Official Video Chart. According to the Official Charts Company, over 500,000 copies of the film were sold in its two-day opening (March 31 – April 1, 2014). During its first three weeks of release in the United Kingdom, Frozen sold more than 1.45 million units and was 2014's biggest-selling video title. Frozen sold 2,025,000 Blu-ray-DVD combination sets in Japan in four weeks, the fastest-selling home video to sell two million copies (surpassing Spirited Away's record of 11 weeks. Frozen holds the records for highest number of home video units sold on the first day and the first week of sales in Japan. By the end of 2014, the film had $308,026,545 in U.S. home-media sales. It is one of the bestselling home-media releases, selling over 18 million units by 2015. Frozen was the all-time bestselling Blu-ray release in the United States by July 2018 with over 7.5 million units sold, slightly ahead of Avatar.

Nielsen Media Research, which records streaming viewership on some U.S. television screens, calculated that between January and June 2025, Frozen accumulated 3.056 billion minutes of viewing time, ranking as the ninth most-streamed film in that period.

=== Lawsuit against Phase 4 Films ===
The Walt Disney Company filed a trademark-infringement lawsuit in California federal court against Phase 4 Films in late December 2013, seeking an injunction against the distribution of The Legend of Sarila, a Canadian film which had been retitled Frozen Land in the United States and had a logo similar to the Disney film. By late January 2014, the companies had settled the lawsuit; the distribution and promotion of The Legend of Sarila and related merchandise had to use its original title, and Phase 4 could not use trademarks, logos or other designs confusingly similar to Disney's release. Phase 4 was required to pay Disney $100,000 by January 27, 2014, and make "all practicable efforts" to remove copies of Frozen Land from stores and online distributors before March 3 of that year.

== Reception ==
=== Box office ===
During its original theatrical release, Frozen earned $400.7 million in North America and an estimated $880 million in other countries for a worldwide total of $1,280,802,282. Calculating all expenses, Deadline Hollywood estimated that the film made a profit of over $400 million. It is the fifth-highest-grossing film, the highest-grossing animated film, the highest-grossing 2013 film, the third highest-grossing Walt Disney Pictures release, and the eighth-highest-grossing film distributed by Disney. The film earned $110.6 million worldwide on its opening weekend. On March 2, 2014, its 101st day of release, it surpassed the $1 billion mark – the eighteenth film in cinematic history, the seventh Disney-distributed film, the fifth non-sequel film, the second Disney-distributed film in 2013 (after Iron Man 3), and the first animated film since Toy Story 3 to do so. Bloomberg Business reported in March 2014 that outside analysts had projected the film's total cost at $323 million to $350 million for production, marketing, and distribution, and projected that the film would generate $1.3 billion in revenue from box-office ticket sales, digital downloads, discs, and television rights.

==== North America ====
Frozen was Fandango's top advance-ticket seller among original animated films, ahead of previous record-holder Brave, and became the top-selling animated film in the company's history in late January 2014. The film's sing-along version later topped the ticket service's best-selling list again for three days. Frozen opened on November 22, 2013, at the El Capitan Theatre in Hollywood for a five-day limited release and earned $342,839 before its wide opening on November 27. It earned $243,390 during the three-day weekend, the seventh-largest per-theater average. The film earned $15.2 million on the opening day of its wide release (including $1.2 million from Tuesday late-night shows) and set a record for the highest pre-Thanksgiving Wednesday opening, ahead of Tangled ($11.9 million). It had the second-largest pre-Thanksgiving Wednesday of all films, behind Catching Fire ($20.8 million). The film finished second over the traditional three-day weekend (Friday to Sunday) with $67.4 million, setting an opening weekend record for Walt Disney Animation Studios films. It had the second-largest opening weekend of films that did not debut at number one. Female audiences accounted for 57 percent of Frozen's total audiences on the first weekend, and family audiences were 81 percent. It set three-day ($67.4 million from Friday to Sunday) and five-day records ($93.6 million from Wednesday to Sunday) records for films that opened during Thanksgiving. It had the second-largest three-day and five-day Thanksgiving grosses of all films, behind Catching Fire.

It declined 53 percent to $31.6 million during the second weekend of wide release but jumped to first place, setting a record for the largest post-Thanksgiving weekend, ahead of Toy Story 2 ($27.8 million). Frozen was the first film since Avatar to reach first place in its sixth weekend of wide release. The film remained in the top 10 at the box office for sixteen consecutive weekends, (the longest run by any film since 2002) and had large weekend grosses from its fifth to twelfth weekends of wide release compared to other films during their respective weekends. On April 25, 2014, Frozen became the nineteenth film to gross $400 million in North America and the fifteenth to do so without a major re-release.

Frozen is the twenty-sixth-highest-grossing film in North America, the third-highest-grossing 2013 film, the fifth-highest-grossing animated film, the highest-grossing 2013 animated film, the twelfth-highest-grossing 3-D film, and the second-highest-grossing Walt Disney Animation Studios film. Excluding re-releases, it has the highest-grossing initial run of non-sequel animated films (a record previously held by Finding Nemo) and Walt Disney Animation Studios films (a record previously held by The Lion King). Box Office Mojo estimated that the film sold over 49 million tickets in North America.

==== Outside North America ====
Frozen is the fifth-highest-grossing film, the highest-grossing animated film, and the highest-grossing 2013 film. It is the highest-grossing animated film in South Korea, Denmark, and Venezuela. It is also the highest-grossing Walt Disney Animation Studios film in more than 45 territories, including Latin America (Mexico and Brazil), the UK, Ireland, Malta, Russia and the CIS, Ukraine, Norway, Malaysia, Singapore, Australia and China.

The film premiered outside North America on the same weekend as its wide North American release, and earned $16.7 million from sixteen markets. It topped the box office outside North America for two weekends in 2014: January 10–12 ($27.8 million) and February 7–9 ($24 million). Frozen's largest opening weekends were in China (a five-day opening earning $14.3 million), Russia and the CIS ($11.9 million, including previews from previous weekend, where the film set an opening-weekend record for Disney animated films), and Japan (a three-day opening earning $9.73 million). It set an opening-weekend record for animated films in Sweden. In total earnings, the film's top market after North America was Japan ($247.6 million), followed by South Korea ($76.6 million) and the United Kingdom, Ireland and Malta ($65.7 million). In South Korea, Frozen is the second-largest foreign film both in attendance and gross, the largest Disney release and the first animated film with more than ten million admissions. It is the third-highest-grossing film of all time in Japan, the second-highest-grossing imported film (behind Titanic), and the highest-grossing Disney film. The film topped Japan's box office for sixteen consecutive weekends until it was passed by another Disney release, Maleficent.

==== Commercial analysis ====
Ray Subers compared Frozen on Box Office Mojo to Disney's 2010 animated feature, Tangled, saying that the film's plot was not as "immediately interesting" and "marketing has yet to sell this to boys the way Tangled did". Noting that the 2013 holiday season (Thanksgiving and Christmas) lacked compelling family content, Subers predicted that the film would "play well all the way through Christmas" and gross $185 million in North America (similar to Wreck-It Ralph). Boxoffice noted the success of previous Disney's animated films released during the holiday season (Tangled and Wreck-It Ralph), but said that Frozen's cast might not attract audiences due to its lack of stars. The magazine made a $170,000,000 North America box-office forecast for the film. Chris Agar of ScreenRant expressed a similar opinion, citing a string of recent box-office successes from the studio; he thought that Frozen would fill a void of kid-friendly films in the marketplace, but did not expect it to surpass Catching Fire in box-office gross.

Clayton Dillard of Slant Magazine said that although its trailers made the film seem "pallid", positive reviews could attract interest from "core demographics" and adult audiences and Frozen might break Tangled's Thanksgiving three-day opening record. Brad Brevet of Ropeofsilicon.com called the film's marketing "severely hit and miss", possibly affecting its box-office performance. After Frozen finished its first weekend with a record $93.6 million during Thanksgiving, most box-office watchers predicted that it would gross between $250 and $300 million in North America. Box Office Mojo repeated its $250 million gross prediction for North America. The website called it "the exclusive choice for family audiences" and attributed its successful opening to strong word of mouth and studio marketing, which highlighted Frozen's humor and its connections to Tangled and Wreck-It Ralph.

=== Critical response ===
Frozen opened to positive reviews, and several critics compared it favorably to Disney Renaissance films such as The Little Mermaid, Beauty and the Beast, Aladdin, and The Lion King. According to some journalists, the film's success heralded a second Disney Renaissance. It was praised for its visuals, themes, musical numbers, screenplay and vocal performances, especially those by Bell, Menzel, and Gad. The "Let It Go" musical sequence was also particularly praised by critics. On the review aggregator website Rotten Tomatoes, 89% of 251 critics' reviews are positive, with an average rating of 7.7/10. The website's consensus reads: "Beautifully animated, smartly written, and stocked with singalong songs, Frozen adds another worthy entry to the Disney canon." Metacritic, which determines an out-of-100 rating from reviews by mainstream critics, calculated a score of 75 from 48 reviews; this indicated "generally favorable reviews". Audiences polled by CinemaScore gave the film a rare A+ grade on an A+-to-F scale. Surveys by Fandango of 1,000 ticket buyers indicated that 75 percent of purchasers had seen the film at least once, and 52 percent had seen it twice. Fifty-five percent of audiences identified "Let It Go" as their favorite song; "Do You Want to Build a Snowman?" and "For the First Time in Forever" were favored by 21 and nine percent, respectively. Frozen was ranked the seventh-best film of 2013 by Richard Corliss of Time and Kyle Smith of the New York Post.

Alonso Duralde of TheWrap wrote that the film is "the best animated musical to come out of Disney since the tragic death of lyricist Howard Ashman, whose work on The Little Mermaid and Beauty and the Beast helped build the studio's modern animated division into what it is today". According to Duralde, "[W]hile it lags the tiniest bit on its way to the conclusion, the script ... really delivers; it offers characters to care about, along with some nifty twists and surprises along the way." Todd McCarthy of The Hollywood Reporter called Frozen a true musical: "You can practically see the Broadway musical Frozen is destined to become while watching Disney's 3D animated princess tale." McCarthy called the film "energetic, humorous and not too cloying, as well as the first Hollywood film in many years to warn of global cooling rather than warming, this tuneful toon upgrades what has been a lackluster year for big studio animated fare and, beginning with its Thanksgiving opening, should live up to box office expectations as one of the studio's hoped-for holiday-spanning blockbusters". Scott Mendelson of Forbes wrote, "Frozen is both a declaration of Disney's renewed cultural relevance and a reaffirmation of Disney coming to terms with its own legacy and its own identity. It's also a just plain terrific bit of family entertainment."

The Los Angeles Times praised the film's ensemble voice talent and elaborate musical scenes, calling Frozen "a welcome return to greatness for Walt Disney Animation Studios". Entertainment Weekly's Owen Gleiberman gave the film a B+ grade and called it a "squarely enchanting fairy tale that shows you how the definition of what's fresh in animation can shift". Richard Corliss of Time wrote, "It's great to see Disney returning to its roots and blooming anew: creating superior musical entertainment that draws on the Walt [Disney] tradition of animation splendor and the verve of Broadway present". Richard Roeper wrote that the film was an "absolute delight from start to finish". Both Michael Phillips of the Chicago Tribune and Stephen Holden of The New York Times praised the film's characters and musical numbers, which were comparable to the theatrics in Wicked. Emma Dibdin of Digital Spy gave the film five out of five stars and called it "a new Disney classic ... an exhilarating, joyous, human story that's as frequently laugh-out-loud funny as it is startling and daring and poignant. Hot on the heels of the 90th anniversary, it's impossible to imagine a more perfect celebration of everything Disney is at its best." Frozen was cited by Norwegian Sámi media as showcasing Sámi culture to a broad audience in a good way. Composer Frode Fjellheim was praised by Norwegian Sámi President Aili Keskitalo for his contributions to the film during the president's 2014 New Year's speech.

Scott Foundas of Variety called the film "formulaic", praising its voice acting and technical artistry: "The tactile, snow-capped Arendelle landscape, including Elsa's ice-castle retreat is Frozen's other true marvel, enhanced by 3D and the decision to shoot in widescreen – a nod to the CinemaScope richness of Sleeping Beauty and Lady and the Tramp ... That's almost but not quite enough to make up for the somewhat slack plotting and the generic nature of the main characters. Neither princess here is a patch on Tangled's babe-in-the-woods Rapunzel, while both Hans and Kristoff are cut from pretty standard-issue hero cloth until a reasonably surprising third-act twist somewhat ups the ante. Only Olaf is unimpeachable: Get this snowman a spinoff feature to call his own." The Seattle Times gave the film two out of four stars: "While it is an often gorgeous film with computer-generated fjords and ice sculptures and castle interiors, the important thing that glues all this stuff together – story – is sadly lacking". Joe Williams of the St. Louis Post-Dispatch also called Frozen's plot the film's weakest point. On Roger Ebert's website, Christy Lemire posted a mixed review and gave the film two-and-a-half stars out of four. Lemire praised the visuals, the performance of "Let It Go" and the film's positive messages, but called the film a "cynical ... attempt to shake things up without shaking them up too much" and noted a similarity between Elsa and Carrie White (another well-known fictional female who unleashes paranormal powers when agitated).

=== Criticism ===
==== Portrayal of emotions ====
Sexism was alleged after Frozen head of animation Lino DiSalvo said to Fan Voice's Jenna Busch, "Historically speaking, animating female characters are really, really difficult, because they have to go through these range of emotions, but you have to keep them pretty". A Disney spokesperson later told Time that DiSalvo's quote was widely misinterpreted, saying that he was "describing some technical aspects of CG animation and not making a general comment on animating females versus males or other characters". Director Lee said that DiSalvo's words were taken out of context when he was speaking in very technical terms about CG animation: "It is hard no matter what the gender is. I felt horrible for him", she said. In an August 2014 interview, DiSalvo reiterated the difficulty of turning any animated character from a series of sketches on a 2D emotion model sheet into a properly rigged 3D character model: "Translating that emotional range onto a CG character is one of the most difficult parts of the process. Male. Female. Snowman. Animal." He added, "The really sad thing is people took that ... catchy headline and they just repopulated it everywhere. People didn't get back to me for comments and the sad thing is that's the way the internet works. They don't want the truth."

==== Perceived LGBTQ parallels ====
A few conservative Christian commentators accused Frozen of promoting homosexuality, saying that the themes of Elsa's being different from others, her ostracism from society, and her independence and rejection of male suitors are metaphors for lesbianism. The lyrics of "Let It Go" were seen as an allusion to coming out. Other viewers argued that Elsa represents a role model for LGBT youth. The claims had a mixed reaction from audiences and the LGBT community.

Akash Nikolas wrote in The Atlantic that Disney films (including Frozen) "subtly appeal[ed] to queer children" with protagonists who are often social outcasts set apart by unusual desires and who reject traditional expectations of marriage. Robert Geal wrote in Film International that although the film has a superficially-progressive vision of homosexuality, it perpetuates conservative notions of sexuality and gender: Elsa's female homosexuality is visually pleasurable to a male gaze, but male transgressions of heterosexuality are negatively coded. Asked about perceived homosexual undertones in the film, Lee was noncommittal: "I don't like to say anything [...] let the fans talk. I think it's up to them". The film should have a "2013 point of view", she said.

==== "Let It Go" lawsuit ====
Chilean singer Jaime Ciero sued Demi Lovato, Idina Menzel, Walt Disney Animation Studios and others involved with "Let It Go" on November 24, 2017, accusing them of infringing his 2008 song "Volar". In May 2018, it was ruled in court that songwriters Robert Lopez and Kristen Anderson-Lopez would be released from the lawsuit due to the three-year statute of limitations for copyright claims. Ciero had been told he could amend his original complaint to address only infringements within the three-year timeframe, and he dropped the suit in May 2019.

=== Accolades ===
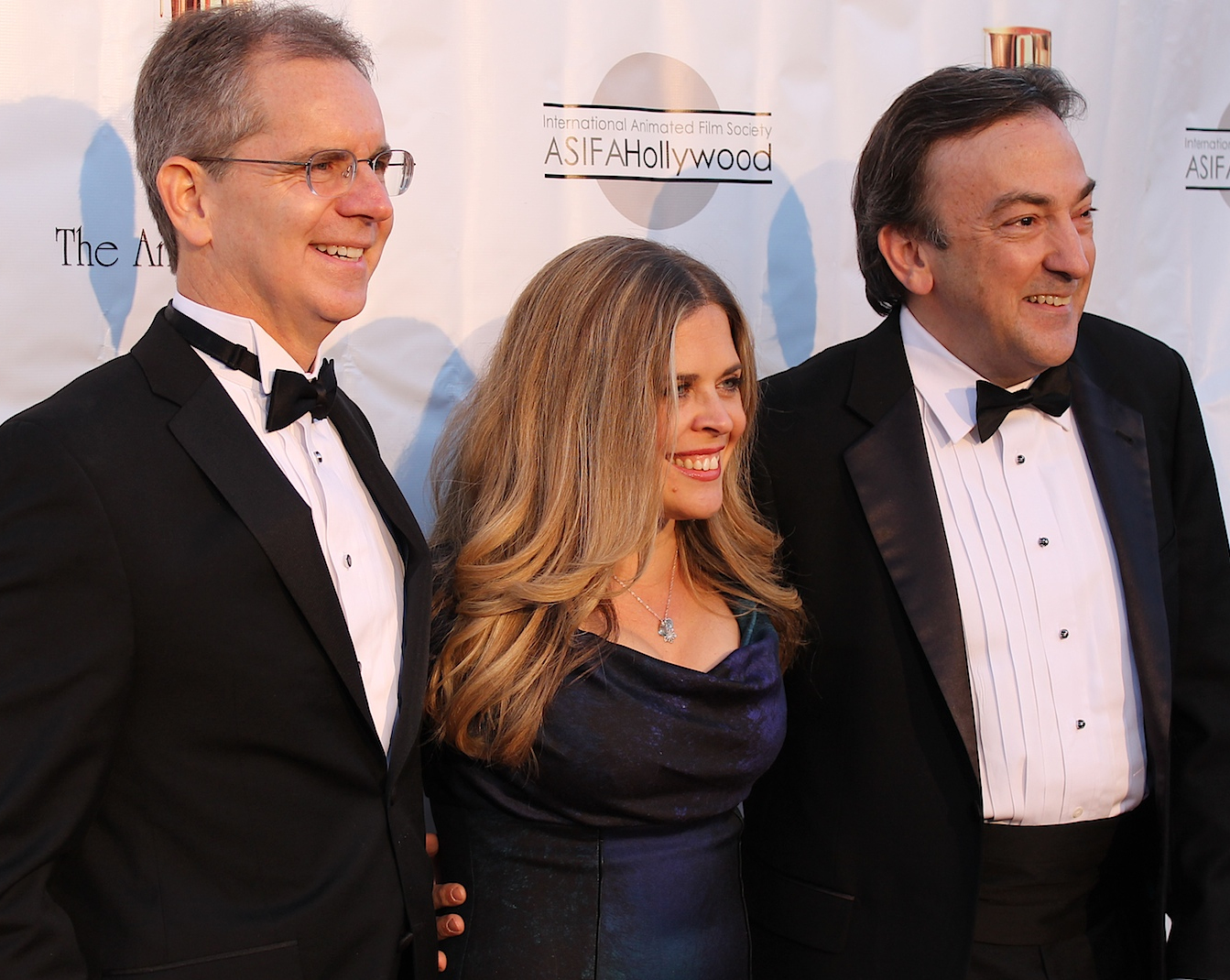
Chris Buck, Jennifer Lee and Peter Del Vecho at the 41st Annie Awards

Frozen was nominated for a number of awards and received several. The song "Let It Go" was singled out for praise. The film was nominated for two awards at the 71st Golden Globe Awards and received the Best Animated Feature award, the first Walt Disney Animation Studios film to win in this category. It received Academy Awards for Best Animated Feature and Best Original Song ("Let It Go"), the BAFTA Award for Best Animated Film at the British Academy Film Awards, five Annie Awards (including Best Animated Feature), and Critics' Choice Awards for Best Animated Feature and Best Original Song ("Let It Go"). The film received similar nominations at the Satellite Awards. At the 57th Annual Grammy Awards, the Frozen soundtrack won the Grammy Award for Best Compilation Soundtrack For Visual Media and was nominated for Best Score Soundtrack For Visual Media (crediting Christophe Beck as composer); "Let It Go" received the Best Song Written For Visual Media award, with credits to Kristen Anderson-Lopez and Robert Lopez as songwriters and Idina Menzel as performer.

== Legacy ==
=== Cultural impact ===
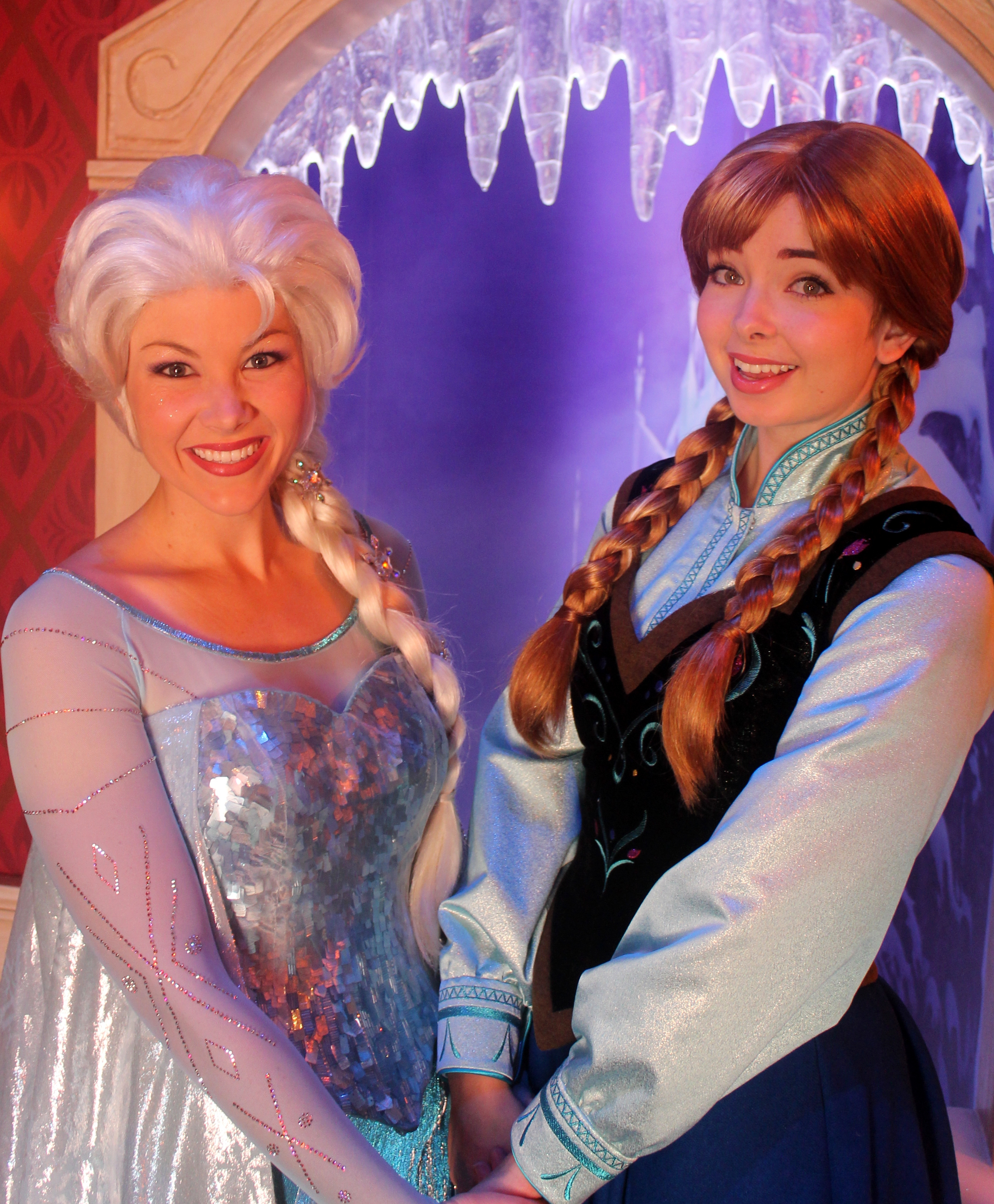
Elsa and Anna at a 2013 Disneyland meet-and-greet

It was observed during the spring and summer of 2014 that Frozen was popular with children in the U.S. and the UK, where the film was watched repeatedly and its songs memorized and sung by children (distressing some parents, teachers and classmates). The phenomenon (called "Frozen-mania" by The Guardian) was noted by journalists and individuals who included UK prime minister David Cameron and actors Ben Affleck, Kevin Costner, and Vince Vaughn, who found themselves dealing with their children's preoccupation with the film. When Terry Gross mentioned the phenomenon to songwriters Lopez and Anderson-Lopez in an April 2014 NPR interview, they said they could not have known how popular their work on Frozen would become; they were "just trying to tell a story that resonated" and "didn't suck". The film's popularity and its status as a popular culture phenomenon was attributed to its emphasis on classic Disney animation elements, the female characters, songs, and the absence of a typical villain. Its sibling relationships and themes of self-acceptance and sacrifice also resonated with audiences worldwide. (Note: Attributed to multiple references:)

In May, columnist Joel Stein of Time magazine wrote about his son Laszlo's frustration with the "cultural assault" of Frozen at preschool and social and extracurricular activities, and Stein's Skype call to lead actress Bell after Laszlo began asking why the film had been made. When Laszlo asked if Bell knew when she made Frozen that it would take over kids' lives, she replied: "I did not know that people would not let it go. No pun intended." In a December 2014 interview with The Hollywood Reporter, Lee acknowledged that she had transitioned from thanking people when they expressed their appreciation for Frozen to having to apologize when they said: "[W]e're still listening to those songs" (with their children). Lee said that she used the film and its strong female characters to inspire her daughter (who had experienced bullying at school), and she had also been bullied as a child; they were true to themselves, like Anna and Elsa.

In a mid-2014 BabyCenter list of the 100 most-used baby names, Elsa was ranked 88th; it was the first time the name had appeared on the website's chart. BabyCenter managing director Sarah Barrett said that although the film's heroine is Anna, "Elsa offers a more unique name and is also a strong female role model". A number of new parents said that their name choices were "heavily influenced" by the fictional siblings. Disney UK vice president Anna Hill later said, "We're delighted that Elsa is a popular name for babies and it's lovely to hear that for many families, it is actually their siblings who have chosen it", and "Elsa's fight to overcome her fears and the powerful strength of the family bond" were relevant to many families. On 2014 year-end Google list, Frozen was the year's most-searched film. At the Google Play store, Frozen and its soundtrack were named the movie and album of the year: the best-selling titles. The Writers Guild Foundation listed Frozen as having one of the best scripts of 2010s film and television, praising it as subverting "rigidly established story and character tropes".

Frozen also became the subject of "a wealth of academic debate", including "a number of academic publications discussing the film's aesthetics, industrial significance and gender politics". The University of East Anglia hosted "Symfrozium", a May 12, 2015 academic conference which was covered by the British news media.

=== Franchise ===
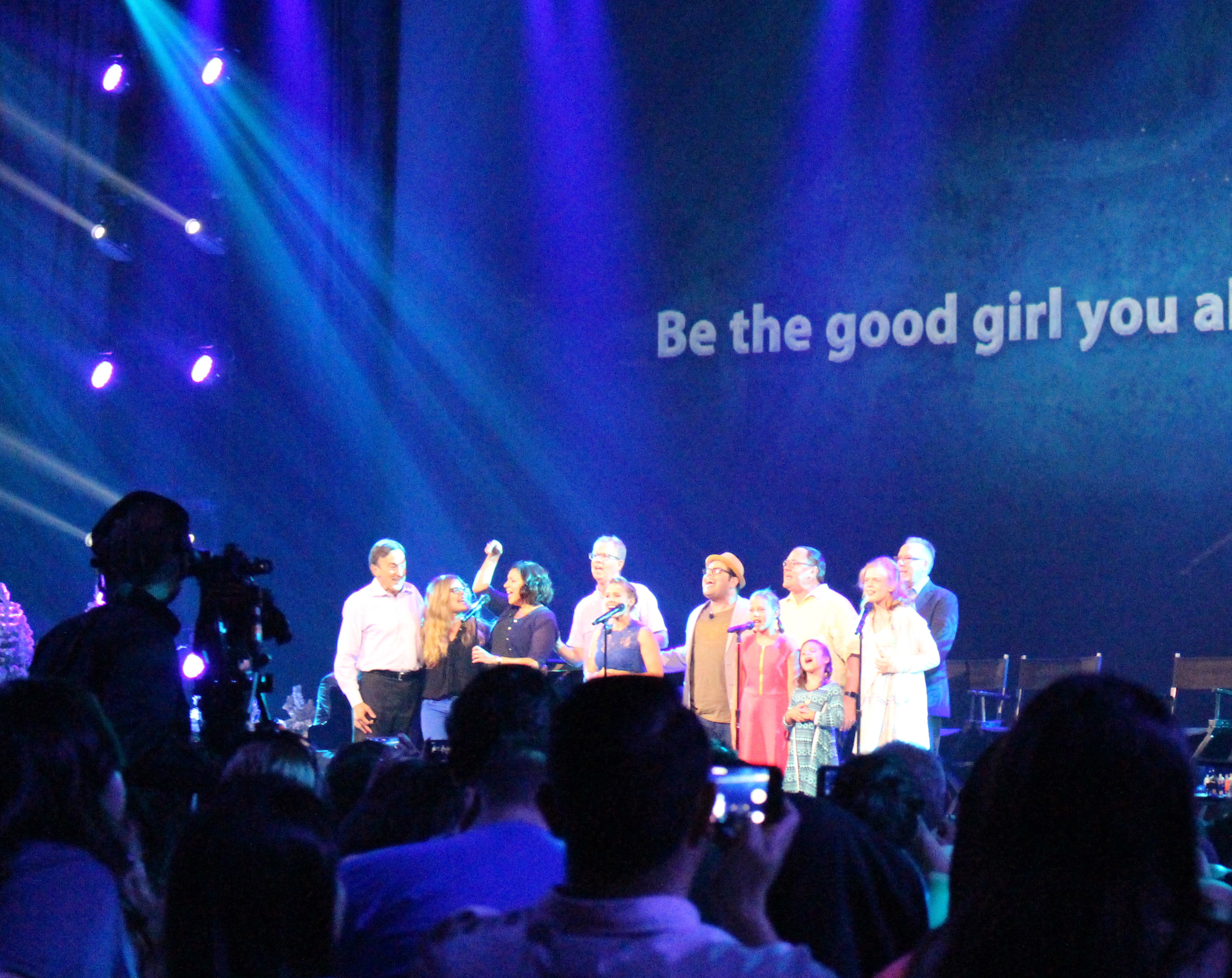
Frozen's directors, composers, producers, and several stars at the "Frozen FANdemonium: A Musical Celebration" presentation at the 2015 D23 Expo, celebrating the film's songs

In January 2014, Iger announced that Frozen would be adapted into a Broadway musical. In one business quarter, Iger went from speaking of Frozen's "franchise potential" (in February 2014) to saying that it was "probably" one of Disney's "top five franchises" (in May). The film's popularity resulted in a merchandise shortage in the United States and several other industrialized countries in April 2014, which increased resale prices for higher-quality limited-edition Frozen dolls and costumes to over $1,000 on eBay. By the time the merchandise shortage was resolved in early November 2014, Disney had sold over three million Frozen costumes in North America. Wait times for meet-and-greets at Disney parks regularly exceeded four hours in February 2014, compelling management to indefinitely extend what was originally intended as a temporary promotion. Disney Parks staged Frozen Summer Fun at Disney's Hollywood Studios, and announced on September 12, 2014, that the Maelstrom ride at Epcot's Norway pavilion would be closed and replaced with a Frozen-based attraction which opened in early 2016. A live Frozen musical stage show opened at the Hyperion Theater in Disney California Adventure on May 27, 2016, replacing Aladdin. By August 2014, Random House had sold over eight million Frozen-related books. Tour operators, including Adventures by Disney, added more tours of Norway in response to increasing 2014 demand.

Showrunners of Once Upon a Time (produced by Disney-owned ABC Studios) conceived of and obtained authorization from ABC and Disney for a Frozen-inspired crossover story arc in the series' fourth season, which was broadcast from September to December 2014. ABC broadcast The Story of Frozen: Making a Disney Animated Classic, a one-hour making-of special, on September 2 of that year. Lasseter announced at the end of the telecast that the production team would reunite to make Frozen Fever, a short film which debuted in theaters with Cinderella on March 13, 2015. On September 4, 2014, Feld Entertainment's Disney on Ice presented the world premiere of a touring ice-skating show based on the film at Amway Center in Orlando, Florida.

During the airing of The Making of Frozen: Return to Arendelle on ABC, it was announced that a holiday special entitled Olaf's Frozen Adventure was in production and scheduled for release in winter 2017. In June 2017, John Lasseter said that the 21-minute special would instead have a limited-time theatrical release. The featurette premiered in theaters with Pixar's Coco on November 22, 2017, and made its television debut on ABC on December 14. Arendelle was a world in Kingdom Hearts III, a 2019 video game which adapts the film's plot. Frozen's voice cast reprised their roles for the game.

== Musical parody ==
In November 2014, the parody musical Wicked Frozen premiered in New York City, the show was a satire of both Frozen and the musical Wicked.

Time Out magazine described Wicked Frozen, "Like an ice capade infused with psychedelic drugs, this musical parody of Wicked and Frozen goes wild to hit every mark a fan could desire."

== Sequels ==
Frozen 2, a feature-length sequel, was released on November 22, 2019. It outgrossed the first film at the box office, and had a positive critical and audience response. Frozen 3 is scheduled to be released in November 2027, while a fourth film is in development.

== See also ==
- List of Disney animated films based on fairy tales
- List of Disney theatrical animated feature films
