= Frozen (franchise) =

Disney media franchise

- Created by: Chris Buck; Jennifer Lee; Shane Morris
- Original work: Frozen (2013)
- Owner: The Walt Disney Company
- Years: 2013–present
- Based on: "The Snow Queen" by Hans Christian Andersen

Print publications
- Books: List of books: The Art of Frozen; Frozen: The Essential Guide; Frozen – Little Golden Book; Frozen – Big Golden Book; Frozen – The Junior Novelization; Frozen – Special Edition Junior Novelization; Frozen: A Sister More Like Me; Frozen: A Tale of Two Sisters; Frozen: Big Snowman, Little Snowman; Frozen: Anna's Best Friends; Frozen: The Christmas Party; Frozen: Anna's Icy Adventure; A Frozen Heart; Anna & Elsa: All Hail the Queen; Anna & Elsa: Memory and Magic; Anna & Elsa: A Warm Welcome; Anna & Elsa: The Great Ice Engine; Anna & Elsa: The Polar Bear Piper; Anna & Elsa: The Arendelle Cup; Anna & Elsa: The Secret Admirer; Anna & Elsa: Return to the Ice Palace; Anna & Elsa: Anna Takes Charge
- Comics: Frozen – Graphic Novel

Films and television
- Films: Frozen (2013); Frozen 2 (2019); Frozen 3 (2027); Frozen 4 (TBA)
- Short films: Frozen Fever (2015); Olaf's Frozen Adventure (2017); Myth: A Frozen Tale (2019); Once Upon a Snowman (2020)
- Animated series: LEGO Disney Frozen: Northern Lights (2016); At Home with Olaf (2020); Olaf Presents (2021)
- Television specials: “Disney Off the Page Adventures: Arendelle Ice Calamity” (2024) “Animals of Arendelle: Lost and Found” (2025) LEGO Disney Frozen: Operation Puffins (2025)

Theatrical presentations
- Play: Frozen – A Musical Spectacular (2016)
- Musicals: Frozen – Live at the Hyperion (2016); Frozen (2018)

Games
- Video games: List of video games: Frozen: Olaf's Quest (2013); Frozen Free Fall (2013); Disney Infinity (2013)^{*}; Club Penguin (2013)^{*}; Disney Infinity: Marvel Super Heroes (2014)^{*}; LittleBigPlanet 3 (2014)^{*}; Fantasia: Music Evolved (2014)^{*}; Frozen Story Theatre (2015); Disney Story Central (2015)^{*}; Disney Magical World 2 (2015)^{*}; Disney Infinity 3.0 (2015)^{*}; Frozen Free Fall: Snowball Fight (2015); Disney Magic Kingdoms (2016)^{*}; Disney Emoji Blitz (2016)^{*}; Club Penguin Island (2017)^{*}; Disney Heroes: Battle Mode (2018)^{*}; Kingdom Hearts III (2019)^{*}; Disney Mirrorverse (2022)^{*}; Disney Dreamlight Valley (2023)^{*}; Disney Speedstorm (2023)^{*}

Audio
- Radio program: Frozen Radio (2014)
- Podcast: Frozen: Forces of Nature (2023)
- Soundtracks: Frozen (Original Motion Picture Soundtrack) (2013); Olaf's Frozen Adventure (Original Soundtrack) (2017); "Making Today a Perfect Day" (2015, single); Frozen 2 (Original Motion Picture Soundtrack) (2019)
- Original music: "Frozen Heart"; "Do You Want to Build a Snowman?"; "For the First Time in Forever"; "Love Is an Open Door"; "Let It Go"; "Reindeer(s) Are Better Than People"; "In Summer"; "Fixer Upper"; "Making Today a Perfect Day"; "All Is Found"; "Some Things Never Change"; "Into the Unknown"; "Lost in the Woods"; "Show Yourself"; "The Next Right Thing"; "Monster"

Miscellaneous
- Toy: Mattel Barbie Disney Frozen Dolls Disney Tsum Tsum^{*}
- Theme park attractions: For the First Time in Forever: A Frozen Sing-Along Celebration (2014–present); Frozen – Live at the Hyperion (2016–present); Frozen Ever After (2016–present); World of Frozen (2023–present)
- Ice shows: Disney on Ice: Frozen
- Brand extension: Frozen Northern Lights

Official website
- Official website
- ^{*} Work where this franchise's characters or settings appeared as part of a crossover, or has characters based on those from this franchise.

Frozen is a Disney media franchise started by the 2013 American animated feature film Frozen, which was directed by Chris Buck and Jennifer Lee, screenplay by Lee and produced by Peter Del Vecho, music score by Christophe Beck, and songs written by Robert Lopez and Kristen Anderson-Lopez. John Lasseter, then-chief creative officer of Walt Disney Animation Studios, served as the film's executive producer. The original film was inspired by Hans Christian Andersen's fairy tale, "The Snow Queen".

Since the film's release in November 2013, the franchise has expanded very rapidly. To date, the franchise includes various Disney theme park attractions, merchandise, toys, video games, books, a Disney on Ice show, a Broadway stage musical and two short animated films. Disney also released Frozen 2 in 2019, and a new book series. In November 2014, TheStreet.com explained that "Frozen is no longer a movie, it's a global brand, a larger than life franchise built around products, theme parks and sequels that could last into the next century". Boxoffice chief analyst Phil Contrino was quoted as saying "it's become massive". The franchise is one of the highest-grossing media franchises of all time.

== History ==
The idea for an animated adaption of Hans Christian Andersen's "The Snow Queen" had been an idea at Disney since the 1940s, but the idea was only put into production during the 2010s.

Frozen logo as a secondary logo, but without frame and blue color.

Frozen was first released on November 10, 2013, to American audiences. The film earned two Academy Awards in 2014 (best animated feature and original song) and took in $1.28 billion globally and sold 4.1 million soundtracks by June 2016. The soundtrack has also been streamed over 51 million times since its release in 2013.

On March 12, 2015, at Disney's annual meeting of shareholders officially announced a full-length sequel was in development at Disney Studios. The Frozen Fever short film was released with Disney's full-length live-action Cinderella in 2015. With the success of the movie, Disney began work on three musical adaptations, for Disney California Adventure, Broadway and Disney Cruise Line, with the first starting in May 2016.

In June 2016, Disney announced a franchise extension called Frozen Northern Lights. This brand extension includes books, animated shorts and a TV special.

== Theatrical films ==
=== Frozen (2013) ===
The 2013 animated film Frozen was released to critical acclaim and commercial success, sparking interest in related media to expand the Frozen universe. By June 2014, the film's reliance on Norway for visual inspiration had resulted in a significant increase in tourism in that country, with a 37% increase in tourists from the United States in the first quarter of 2014 (in comparison to the previous year's first quarter). Tour operators (including Adventures by Disney) responded by adding more Norway tours.

When asked about future sequels, Del Vecho explained in March that Buck, Lee and he "work very, very well together, so I believe we will be developing a new project. But I don't know what that is right now." In late April, Walt Disney Studios chairman Alan F. Horn said that "we haven't really talked about a sequel" because the studio's current priority is the planned Broadway musical, which will require "four or five" additional songs to be written by Lopez and Anderson-Lopez. When asked in May about a sequel during an interview with CNBC's David Faber, Disney chairman and CEO Bob Iger said that Disney would not "mandate a sequel" or "force storytelling", because to do so would risk creating something not as good as the first film. In the same interview, Iger also expressed hope that the Frozen franchise "is something that is kind of forever for the company" similar to The Lion King. In June, Lee confirmed that chief creative officer John Lasseter had expressly granted her and Buck the freedom to explore whatever they were "passionate about": "We don't know what it is yet ... We're actually going to start from scratch. It’ll be something completely brand new."

On August 5, 2014, Variety reported that Lee had selected her next project: a screenplay adaptation of Madeleine L'Engle's 1962 novel A Wrinkle in Time, for which Disney already holds the film adaptation rights. However, Lee will continue to participate in Disney Animation's development process (i.e. giving notes on other projects, the same process by which she became involved with Frozen in the first place).

On November 28, 2014, in an interview with The Daily Telegraph, when asked about the possibilities of a Frozen sequel and a stage show, Idina Menzel mentioned "they're all in the works." She also talked about her involvement in these projects: "Ah, yeah sure... Not the stage show – I don't know what will happen with that – but the movie hopefully. We’ll see. I'm just going along for the ride." However, on December 1, when the subject came up again during an interview on the Today show on the NBC network, Menzel said, "You know, I have no idea. I just assumed that because it's so successful that's what they're up to!"

In a March 2015 interview with BuzzFeed about Frozen Fever, the directors addressed and refuted the recurring rumors about a possible feature-length sequel. Buck joked about how whenever they saw such rumors, he and Lee would ask each other, "Are we?" Around the same time, Lasseter reiterated to Variety his philosophy as to sequels (while discussing Toy Story 4): "We do not do any sequel because we want to print money[.] We do it because each of these films was created by a group of filmmakers, and to my mind, they are the owners of that intellectual property. So we look at it with the simple question: Is there another story we can tell in this world? And that desire has to come from the filmmaker group. Sometimes, the answer is an obvious yes. And sometimes it's, 'I love the characters and I love the world, but I don't have an idea yet.' And sometimes it's just, 'that movie is a great movie,' and the filmmaker wants to move on and do something else. And that's fine, too."

=== Frozen 2 (2019) ===
On March 12, 2015, at Disney's annual meeting of shareholders in San Francisco, Iger, Lasseter, and actor Josh Gad (the voice of Olaf) officially announced that Frozen 2 was in development at Disney, with Buck and Lee returning as directors and Del Vecho returning as producer. Lasseter explained that at Disney Animation, "as with Pixar, when we do a sequel, it is because the filmmakers who created the original have created an idea that is so good that it's worthy of these characters." In the case of Frozen, the directors had "come up with a great idea for a sequel and you will be hearing a lot more about it, and we're taking you back to Arendelle." According to the Los Angeles Times, there was "considerable internal debate" at Disney over whether to proceed with a Frozen sequel at Disney Animation, but the unprecedented success of the first film apparently swayed Disney executives towards making a sequel. A month later, Buck disclosed during a visit to Australia that the directors already had an idea for the sequel's ending, but they are still working on the story that will eventually culminate in that ending. He acknowledged their awareness of the challenge they have undertaken: "How do we live up to the phenomenon of the first one? There's a lot of pressure. And we'll put that on ourselves too; we'll be very demanding about how good this one has to be."

In November 2015, Del Vecho, while visiting Duke University as the parent of a first-year Duke student, explained in an interview published in the Duke student newspaper that his days are currently divided between two things: "handling the Frozen franchise" and "working up ideas for the development of Frozen 2" with the directors. When asked what to expect from the sequel, Del Vecho stated: "We're excited by the ideas we have, but it's too early to talk about them. We wouldn't be making a sequel if we felt that we didn't have a story to tell that was equal to or greater than the original."

In March 2016, Kristen Bell, the voice of Anna, was asked if she had started recording for the Frozen sequel while doing promotional interviews for The Boss. She replied: "Not yet. We're just about to. They’ve just written it and they're still doing tweaks, but I think we should be recording this month. The story is great, and they exude quality .... It took them a while because they wanted to figure out what story they needed to tell and what would be important and engaging and I think they found it." In September, Bell explained in another interview that her earlier comments were mistaken, and she had not yet recorded lines for the sequel because Disney Animation was "still putting the finishing touches on the script," but in the meantime, she had already recorded lines and songs for other Frozen-related projects, like Olaf's Frozen Adventure.

In April 2017, it was announced that the sequel would be released on November 27, 2019.

In August 2017, it was announced that Frozen 2 would be released on Disney+ alongside Toy Story 4 and The Lion King (2019).

In March 2018, Anderson-Lopez in an interview about Broadway's Frozen, for which she and her husband wrote the new featured songs, confirmed that they had already recorded a song for the sequel with Bell, the voice of Anna.

In July 2018, it was announced that Evan Rachel Wood and Sterling K. Brown had entered talks to join the cast in undisclosed roles. In August 2018, Allison Schroeder, the screenwriter of Hidden Figures and most recently, Disney's Christopher Robin was hired to assist screenwriting duties with Jennifer Lee after Lee assumed the role of chief creative officer of Disney Animation, succeeding Lasseter.

On November 1, 2018, Variety reported that Disney advanced five days the premiere of the film, which was initially scheduled for November 27, 2019 and now would be released on November 22, 2019. The teaser trailer was released on February 13, 2019.

=== Frozen 3 (2027) ===
On February 8, 2023, Disney CEO Bob Iger confirmed that the franchise would continue as he announced Frozen 3 (stylized as Frozen III) was in the works. The sequel was originally set to release on November 25, 2026, but at the 2024 D23 Expo, Disney Animation announced it was rescheduled to November 24, 2027. In November 2025, it was reported that Once Upon a Studio (2023) director Trent Correy signed on as co-director of Frozen 3. In February 2026, Josh Gad began recording voice work for his role as Olaf. At the D23 fan event in August 2026, characters figures with new outfits were on display, and footage from the film was shown.

=== Frozen 4 ===
Bob Iger has also confirmed that Frozen 4 (stylized as Frozen IV) is in production, back-to-back with Frozen III, making Frozen the first animated franchise to produce two films in this way. On the topic, Iger told Good Morning America: "Frozen 3 is in the works, and there might be a Frozen 4 in the works too, but I don't have much to say about those films right now. Jennifer Lee, who created the original Frozen and Frozen 2, is hard at work with her team at Disney animation on not one but actually two stories."

== Cast and characters ==
List indicators

This section includes characters who will appear or have appeared in the franchise.

- An empty grey cell indicates the character was not in the film, or that the character's official presence has not yet been confirmed.
- ^{A} indicates an appearance through archival footage or audio.
- ^{U} indicates an uncredited appearance.
- ^{Y} indicates a younger version of the character.
- ^{O} indicates an appearance in the original cast on Broadway.
- ^{R} indicates an appearance as a replacement cast member on Broadway.

| Characters | Feature films | | | Short films | | Television specials | | Stage musicals | | | Short series | |
| Characters | Frozen | Frozen 2 | Frozen 3 | Frozen Fever | Once Upon a Snowman | Olaf's Frozen Adventure | LEGO Frozen Northern Lights | Broadway | First National Tour | West End | At Home with Olaf | Olaf Presents |
|---|---|---|---|---|---|---|---|---|---|---|---|---|
| Anna | Kristen Bell | Kristen Bell | Kristen Bell | Kristen Bell | Kristen Bell^{A} | Kristen Bell | Kristen Bell | Patti Murin^{O} | Caroline Innerbichler | Stephanie McKeon | | |
| Anna | Livvy Studenrauch^{Y} | Livvy Studenrauch^{A}^{Y} | Kristen Bell | Kristen Bell | Kristen Bell^{A} | Kristen Bell | Kristen Bell | McKenzie Kurtz^{R} | Caroline Innerbichler | Stephanie McKeon | | |
| Anna | Katie Lopez^{Y} | Hadley Gannaway^{Y} | Kristen Bell | Kristen Bell | Livvy Studenrauch^{A}^{Y} | Kristen Bell | Kristen Bell | Audrey Bennett^{O}^{Y} | Stella R. Cobb^{Y} | Stephanie McKeon | | |
| Anna | Agatha Lee Monn^{Y} | Hadley Gannaway^{Y} | Kristen Bell | Kristen Bell | Livvy Studenrauch^{A}^{Y} | Kristen Bell | Kristen Bell | Mattea Conforti^{O}^{Y} | Arwen Monzon-Sanders^{Y} | Stephanie McKeon | | |
| Elsa | Idina Menzel | Idina Menzel | Idina Menzel | Idina Menzel | Idina Menzel^{A} | Idina Menzel | Idina Menzel | Caissie Levy^{O} | Caroline Bowman | Samantha Barks | | |
| Elsa | Eva Bella^{Y} | Eva Bella^{A}^{Y} | Idina Menzel | Idina Menzel | Idina Menzel^{A} | Idina Menzel | Idina Menzel | Ciara Renée^{R} | Caroline Bowman | Samantha Barks | | |
| Elsa | Spencer Lacey Ganus^{Y} | Mattea Conforti^{Y} | Idina Menzel | Idina Menzel | Eva Bella^{A}^{Y} | Eva Bella^{Y} | Idina Menzel | Brooklyn Nelson^{O}^{Y} | Alyssa Kim^{Y} | Samantha Barks | | |
| Elsa | Spencer Lacey Ganus^{Y} | Mattea Conforti^{Y} | Idina Menzel | Idina Menzel | Eva Bella^{A}^{Y} | Eva Bella^{Y} | Idina Menzel | Ayla Schwartz^{O}^{Y} | Jaiden Klein^{Y} | Samantha Barks | | |
| Kristoff | Jonathan Groff | Jonathan Groff | Jonathan Groff | Jonathan Groff | Jonathan Groff^{A} | Jonathan Groff | Jonathan Groff | Jelani Alladin^{O} | Mason Reeves | Obioma Ugoala | | |
| Kristoff | Tyree Brown^{Y} | Jonathan Groff | Jonathan Groff | Jonathan Groff | Jonathan Groff^{A} | Jonathan Groff | Jonathan Groff | Noah J. Ricketts^{R} | Mason Reeves | Obioma Ugoala | | |
| Olaf | Josh Gad | Josh Gad | Josh Gad | Josh Gad | Josh Gad | Josh Gad | Josh Gad | Greg Hildreth^{O} | F. Michael Haynie | Craig Gallivan | Josh Gad | Josh Gad |
| Olaf | Josh Gad | Josh Gad | Josh Gad | Josh Gad | Josh Gad | Josh Gad | Josh Gad | Ryann Redmond^{R} | F. Michael Haynie | Craig Gallivan | Josh Gad | Josh Gad |
| Sven | Frank Welker^{U} | Jonathan Groff | TBA | Animal sounds only | Frank Welker | Animal sounds only | Jonathan Groff | Andrew Pirozzi | Collin Baja | Ashley Birchall | | Frank Welker |
| Sven | Frank Welker^{U} | Jonathan Groff | TBA | Animal sounds only | Frank Welker | Animal sounds only | Jonathan Groff | Adam Jepsen | Evan Strand | Mikayla Jade | | Frank Welker |
| Hans | Santino Fontana | Santino Fontana^{A} | TBA | Santino Fontana | | | | John Riddle^{O} | Austin Colby | Oliver Ormson | | |
| Hans | Santino Fontana | Santino Fontana^{A} | TBA | Santino Fontana | | | | Joe Carroll^{R} | Austin Colby | Oliver Ormson | | |
| Hans | Santino Fontana | Santino Fontana^{A} | TBA | Santino Fontana | | | | Ryan McCartan^{R} | Austin Colby | Oliver Ormson | | |
| Marshmallow | Paul Briggs | Paul Briggs | | Paul Briggs | | | | | | | | Paul Briggs |
| Oaken | Chris Williams | Silent cameo | | Chris Williams | Chris Williams | Chris Williams | Chris Williams | Kevin Del Aguila^{O} | Michael Milkanin | Jak Skelly | | |
| King Agnarr | Maurice LaMarche | Alfred Molina | | | | Silent cameo | | James Brown III^{O} | Kyle Lamar Mitchell | Gabriel Mokake | | |
| King Agnarr | Maurice LaMarche | Jackson Stein^{Y} | | | | Silent cameo | | Tyrone Robinson^{R} | Kyle Lamar Mitchell | Gabriel Mokake | | |
| Queen Iduna | Jennifer Lee | Aurora (Note: Aurora's character is referred to as The Voice.) | | | | Silent cameo | | Ann Sanders^{O} | Marina Kondo | Jacqui Sanchez | | |
| Queen Iduna | Jennifer Lee | Evan Rachel Wood | | | | Silent cameo | | Ann Sanders^{O} | Marina Kondo | Jacqui Sanchez | | |
| Queen Iduna | Jennifer Lee | Delaney Rose Stein^{Y} | | | | Silent cameo | | Ann Sanders^{O} | Marina Kondo | Jacqui Sanchez | | |
| Duke of Weselton | Alan Tudyk | Alan Tudyk^{A} | | | | | | Robert Creighton^{O} | Jeremy Morse | Richard Frame | | |
| Grand Pabbie | Ciarán Hinds | Ciarán Hinds | | | | | | Timothy Hughes^{O} | Tyler Jiminez | Joshua St. Clair | | |
| Grand Pabbie | Ciarán Hinds | Ciarán Hinds | | | | | | Harris M. Turner^{R} | Tyler Jiminez | Joshua St. Clair | | |
| Bulda | Maia Wilson | Maia Wilson | | | | | | Olivia Phillip^{O} | Brit West | Emily Mae | | |
| Bulda | Maia Wilson | Maia Wilson | | | | | | Tracee Beazer^{R} | Brit West | Emily Mae | | |
| Lieutenant Mattias | | Sterling K. Brown | | | | | | | | | | |
| Yelana | | Martha Plimpton | | | | | | | | | | |
| Honeymaren | | Rachel Matthews | | | | | | | | | | |
| Ryder | | Jason Ritter | | | | | | | | | | |
| King Runeard | | Jeremy Sisto | | | | | | | | | | |

== Crew ==
| Role | Films | | | Short films | | |
| Role | Frozen | Frozen 2 | Frozen 3 | Frozen Fever | Once Upon a Snowman | Olaf's Frozen Adventure |
|---|---|---|---|---|---|---|
| Director(s) | Chris Buck; Jennifer Lee | Chris Buck; Jennifer Lee | Jennifer Lee Co-Director: Trent Correy | Chris Buck; Jennifer Lee | Dan Abraham; Trent Correy | Kevin Deters; Stevie Wermers |
| Producer(s) | Peter Del Vecho | Peter Del Vecho | TBA | Aimee Scribner; Peter Del Vecho | Nicole Hearon; Peter Del Vecho | Roy Conli |
| Executive producer | John Lasseter | Byron Howard | TBA | John Lasseter | Jennifer Lee | John Lasseter |
| Screenwriter(s) | Jennifer Lee | Jennifer Lee | Jennifer Lee | Chris Buck; Jennifer Lee; Marc E. Smith | Dan Abraham; Trent Correy | Jac Schaeffer |
| Story by | Chris Buck; Shane Morris; Jennifer Lee | Chris Buck; Robert Lopez; Jennifer Lee; Marc E. Smith; Kristen Anderson-Lopez | TBA | Chris Buck; Jennifer Lee; Marc E. Smith | Dan Abraham; Trent Correy | Jac Schaeffer |
| Songwriters | Robert Lopez (music and lyrics); Kristen Anderson-Lopez (music and lyrics) | | | | —N/a | Kate Anderson; Elyssa Samsel |
| Composer | Christophe Beck | Christophe Beck | TBA | Christophe Beck | Jeff Morrow; Christophe Beck | Jeff Morrow; Christophe Beck |
| Editor | Jeff Draheim | Jeff Draheim | TBA | Jeff Draheim | Jeff Draheim | Jesse Averna; Jeremy Milton |

== Video games ==
A video game titled Frozen: Olaf's Quest was released on November 19, 2013, for Nintendo DS and Nintendo 3DS. Developed by 1st Playable Productions and published by GameMill Entertainment, it takes place after the events of the film. In the game, Olaf must use his unique snowman abilities in order to stay in one piece throughout 60 levels.

Anna and Elsa were released as figurines in the Frozen toy box pack for the toy-based video game Disney Infinity on November 26, 2013, and both figures were released separately on March 11, 2014.

Additionally, Disney Mobile released a match-three game titled Frozen: Free Fall for Android, iOS, Windows Phone, and PlayStation 4 platforms. It takes place in the kingdom of Arendelle and closely follows the original story of the film, in which players can team up with Anna, Elsa, Kristoff, Hans, Olaf, Pabbie, and Sven to match puzzles with the help of each character's special power-ups.

Six mini-games can be played on the Disney website. Sony released a limited-edition Frozen-themed PlayStation 4 console in Japan at the time the film was released into the Japanese home video market.

In 2014, Frozen was co-branded with another Disney property – children's massively multiplayer online role-playing game Club Penguin, which became Frozen-themed for a period of time leading up to the Christmas season; the Frozen Party lasted from August 21 to September 3, 2014.

In 2015, Frozen Free Fall: Snowball Fight was released on PlayStation 4, PlayStation 3, Xbox One, Xbox 360, and Steam.

In the world builder game Disney Magic Kingdoms, during a limited time 2016 Event focused on Frozen were included Anna, Elsa, Olaf, Kristoff, Sven, and Hans as playable characters, along with some attractions based on locations of the film. In another limited time 2019 Event focused on Frozen 2, were included Ryder, Honeymaren, and Fire Spirit as playable characters, along with some attractions based on locations of the sequel. The game also features optional costumes for the characters based on their clothes from the films and shorts from the franchise. In 2024, Marshmallow was added to the game.

A world based on Frozen, "Arendelle" appears in the 2019 crossover video game Kingdom Hearts III, with the cast of the film reprising their voice roles.

Additionally, Elsa, Anna, Kristoff, and Olaf are all playable heroes in the mobile game Disney Heroes: Battle Mode. Sven also appears in Kristoff's green skill.

Anna, Elsa, Kristoff, and Olaf are present in their Frozen 2 designs in the video game Disney Dreamlight Valley, where the player meets them during the progress of the story.

== Board games ==
At least 24 board games have been released in conjunction with the Frozen films. The games include special editions of classic games including Monopoly, Don't Break the Ice, Candy Land, Chutes and Ladders, Labyrinth, and Yahtzee.

== Television ==
The first Frozen film played a factor in the fourth season of Once Upon a Time, a series produced by Disney-owned ABC Studios. The conclusion of the show's third season finale, "There's No Place Like Home", revealed a new storyline that would incorporate elements from Frozen, centering on the arrival of Elsa, after the urn that contained her was accidentally brought via a time-traveling portal from the fairytale world to present-day Storybrooke, Maine. The series' creators and showrunners, Edward Kitsis and Adam Horowitz, later explained that Disney had not asked them to do a crossover; they instead fell in love with Frozen when it premiered, saw it three more times, then developed a story treatment in February 2014 and successfully pitched it to ABC Studios, the ABC network, and the Disney brand management. The producers shared that "their writers' room was "basically a 'Frozen' appreciation room" and they would be "completely honored" if the original film's stars wanted to reprise their roles. Horowitz further said that they were not going to "redo" the film: "We're very aware of what we think makes this character from 'Frozen' so special and we want to honor that and make sure that what we do is in the universe of [what] everyone fell in love with this past year."

Georgina Haig, Elizabeth Lail, and Scott Michael Foster respectively portray Elsa, Anna, and Kristoff in Once Upon a Time. Other Frozen characters in the series include Hans, portrayed by Tyler Jacob Moore, and Pabbie, voiced by John Rhys-Davies. The show's fourth season depicts a storyline taking place two years after the original film's events, though it is not considered canon to the main Frozen franchise. The storyline concluded after the season's eleventh episode, "Heroes and Villains". The Frozen characters and locations were then occasionally referenced in subsequent seasons.

A one-hour special titled The Story of Frozen: Making a Disney Animated Classic aired on September 2, 2014, on ABC. It featured interviews with some of the cast and the creative team of the film, footage from Norway that inspired the look of Frozen, announcements of what is next for the franchise, and a preview of Anna, Elsa, and Kristoff's appearances in Once Upon a Time.

Josh Gad reprises his voice role as Olaf in an episode of Sofia the First titled "The Secret Library: Olaf and the Tale of Miss Nettle", which premiered February 15, 2016 on Disney Channel and Disney Junior.

Arendelle Castle Yule Log, an animated yule log television program, was released on Disney+ in mid-December 2019. The program, which lasts about three hours, features a yule log burning in Arendelle Castle's fireplace with Kristoff, Olaf and Sven make appearances. An updated version was released in December 2020.

== Short films ==
=== Frozen Fever (2015) ===
Frozen Fever is a short sequel that was released in early 2015. The short film was teased during The Story of Frozen: Making a Disney Animated Classic by Lasseter. Lee and Buck returned as directors and Del Vecho and Aimee Scribner as producers of the short, featuring a new song by Lopez and Anderson-Lopez. The short involves Elsa and Kristoff throwing a birthday party for Anna, but Elsa's icy powers put the party at risk. Frozen Fever debuted in theaters with Disney's Cinderella on March 13, 2015. The short film was released on the Walt Disney Animation Studios Short Films Collection DVD/Blu-ray Combo Pack on August 18, 2015. It was also included on the DVD, Blu-ray, and digital HD releases of Cinderella on September 15, 2015.

=== Olaf's Frozen Adventure (2017) ===
A Frozen holiday special Olaf's Frozen Adventure premiered in 2017. It is directed by Kevin Deters and Stevie Wermers-Skelton (Prep & Landing, Prep & Landing: Operation: Secret Santa), and is produced by Roy Conli (Tangled, Big Hero 6). Teased during the airing The Making of Frozen: Return to Arendelle, the 21-minute special received a limited time theatrical release, premiering in theaters with Pixar's Coco on November 22, 2017, and made its television debut on ABC on December 14 the same year. The DVD/Blu-ray for the short film was released in the US and Canada on November 13, 2018.

=== Myth: A Frozen Tale (2019) ===
Myth: A Frozen Tale is a virtual reality short directed by Jeff Gipson, debuted alongside Frozen 2. Evan Rachel Wood portrays an Arendelle mother narrating a story of the four elementals. The VR short was released for the Oculus Quest on June 11, 2020, while a "flat" version was released to Disney+ on February 26, 2021.

=== Once Upon a Snowman (2020) ===
The short film Once Upon a Snowman was released exclusively on Disney+ on October 23, 2020, featuring the voice of Josh Gad as Olaf. The short details Olaf's origin from the moment he was created by Elsa during "Let It Go", to his first meeting with Anna, Kristoff and Sven in the original film.

=== LEGO Disney Frozen: Operation Puffins (2025) ===
A Lego special, LEGO Disney Frozen: Operation Puffins, was released on Disney+ in October 24, 2025. Taking place shortly after Frozen Fever, it shows that the Duke of Weselton loses everything after the events of the first film, and after finding a group of puffins, he sees that he can use them for revenge. At Arendelle Castle, while Elsa is shown to be stressed because everything in the castle must be in a certain position, Anna helps Olaf, Kristoff and Sven settle in, where they are not very happy due to the rules of how everything must be. At that moment, the puffins appear and steal the castle pieces for the Duke of Weselton, who intends to build his own castle. Then, a chase begins in which the protagonists must stop the Duke while he transports the pieces on a train. After recovering the castle pieces, Anna and Elsa realize that home is wherever they are, and decide to rebuild the castle, this time with the rooms the way they like them.

=== Untitled short film (2026) ===
In a February 2026 interview with License Global, Paul Glitter, the executive vice president of global brand commercialization at Disney Consumer Products, revealed that a new Frozen short film would be released in October. He elaborated by saying, "we're excited to kick off the countdown to Frozen III with a new short this October, ahead of our biggest ever cross-company movie marketing campaign in 2027."

== Short series ==
=== At Home with Olaf (2020) ===
Disney released a series of short clips centered entirely around Olaf on their YouTube and Twitter pages on April 6, 2020. The shorts feature Josh Gad reprising his role as Olaf, and were animated by Hyrum Osmond and a few other animators, from their homes. These shorts were made during the COVID-19 pandemic. The series ended on May 13 of that year with a special musical montage short entitled I Am with You. The latter contains clips from other Disney animated films, such as Dumbo, Cinderella, Beauty and the Beast, Hercules, Wreck-It Ralph, the original Frozen, and more. 21 shorts were released in total.

=== Olaf Presents (2021) ===
Olaf Presents was released on Disney+ on November 12, 2021, to coincide with Disney+ Day. The series of shorts center on Olaf narrating Disney stories "as only he can". The series is inspired by a scene in Frozen 2 in which Olaf recapped the entirety of the first film in 90 seconds. The five recapped films in the series are The Little Mermaid, Aladdin, The Lion King, Tangled and Moana.

== Docuseries ==
=== Into the Unknown: Making Frozen 2 (2020) ===
A documentary series about the making of Frozen 2 was launched on Disney+, entitled Into the Unknown: Making Frozen 2, starting on June 26, 2020. Throughout six episodes, the series follows the production crew and voice cast of Frozen 2 in the film's final year of development. It was directed by Megan Harding, and produced by Lincoln Square Productions. Harding aimed to represent the production process honestly and the crew filmed for 115 days.

== Music ==
The Frozen franchise contains many songs which have achieved a level of independent success outside the context of the films they were featured in. These include:

=== Frozen (2013) ===
- "Frozen Heart"
- "Do You Want to Build a Snowman?"
- "For the First Time in Forever"
- "Love Is an Open Door"
- "Let It Go"
- "Reindeer(s) Are Better Than People"
- "In Summer"
- "Fixer Upper"

=== Frozen Fever (2015) ===
- "Making Today a Perfect Day"

=== Olaf's Frozen Adventure (2017) ===
- "Ring in the Season"
- "The Ballad of Flemmingrad"
- "That Time of Year"
- "When We're Together"

=== Frozen: The Broadway Musical (2018) ===
- "Dangerous to Dream"
- "Monster"
- "What Do You Know About Love?"
- "True Love"
- "I Can't Lose You"

=== Frozen 2 (2019) ===
- "All Is Found"
- "Some Things Never Change"
- "Into the Unknown"
- "When I Am Older"
- "Lost in the Woods"
- "Show Yourself"
- "The Next Right Thing"

=== At Home with Olaf (2020) ===
- "I Am With You"

The Frozen soundtrack was also very successful becoming the best-selling album of 2014 with over 10 million copies sold and "Let It Go", becoming the fifth best-selling single of 2014. A radio program titled Frozen Radio is another format used to provide Frozen and other Disney songs to listeners. Additionally, a song titled "The Making of Frozen" was written as a featurette for the DVD/Blu-ray release of Frozen.

In addition to the songs from the film, the Broadway stage production added 11 songs and 3 reprises, including a "Let It Go" reprise as the finale. In 2019, for the North American tour, a new song "I Can't Lose You" was added to replace "For The First Time in Forever (reprise)". This change was then implemented to the Broadway production beginning February 18, 2020.

== Live shows ==
With the success of the movie, Disney began work on three musical adaptations, as an attraction at the Hyperion Theater in Disney California Adventure, for Broadway and Disney Cruise Line.

=== Disney on Ice ===
Disney on Ice: Frozen
- Company: Ice Follies And Holiday on Ice, Inc. as Disney on Ice
- Genre: fantasy
- Show type: ice skating show
- Date of premiere: September 4, 2014
- Location: touring

Creative team
- choreographers: Cindy Stuart; Benjamin Agosto
- principal skaters: Taylor Firth; (as Princess Anna); Becky Bereswill; (as Princess Elsa)
- producer: Nicole Feld

On May 20, 2014, it was reported that Feld Entertainment's Disney on Ice was planning an ice skating show based on Frozen with assistance from the film's producers and directors, and that the show would start touring in September 2014 starting in Orlando, Florida, with a cast of 39. The show's world premiere was presented on September 4, 2014, at Orlando's Amway Center. Feld Entertainment disclosed in November that they had sold 250,000 tickets on the day they first became available and expected that over one million people would have seen the Frozen show by the end of 2014.

The show includes a traditional "Ice Follies PinWheel" while still performing difficult ice skating jumps. All the popular songs from the movie are included. About Figure Skating Expert Jo Ann Schneider Farris gave it 5 stars.

=== Broadway stage musical (2018) ===
"The first priority [for Disney Theatrical in 2016], I have to tell you, is when you have a property that is as beloved and music-based as "Frozen," that has to get an enormous amount of my attention. To say, How do we take this and make a sophisticated, adult evening of theater out of it? Because, as we know with our hits, they have been for that audience that includes the sophisticated theater-goer."

— Tom Schumacher, interview with Southern California Public Radio in November 2014

In January 2014, Iger stated that Disney Theatrical Productions is in early development of a Broadway stage musical adaptation of Frozen. No specific date has yet been set for this adaptation. "We're not demanding speed," Iger said. "We're demanding excellence."

During Disney's February 2014 earnings call, Iger congratulated "all those involved with Frozen" and reiterated that it would "be going to Broadway." He also noted that Frozen "has real franchise potential" and predicted that "You will see Frozen in more places than you've certainly seen today."

At the end of March 2014, Del Vecho confirmed that there had been "discussions on how we can support the [film's] characters at other locations [and] [w]e are also discussing making a theatrical [musical] version of Frozen, but these things take time." In late June, Anderson-Lopez and Lopez said there will be a musical based on Frozen within "a few years".

In an October 2014 interview, Thomas Schumacher, the president of Disney Theatrical Group, disclosed that discussions about a musical had begun even before the film was released almost a year earlier. After watching Frozen at a pre-release midnight screening, he texted Lasseter at 1:30 a.m. with "When can we start?" and got a call back from Lasseter within 60 seconds. Schumacher explained: "My job is to corral the writers of the movie. I'm already talking to directors, and I have a design concept, and we have to begin to fashion this idea. It doesn't need to be fast. It needs to be great."

On 13 February 2015, Schumacher issued a terse statement confirming that the songwriters were working on the show and that Lee would be writing the "book" of the stage version (the musical equivalent of a script), then stressed that "no other staffing or dates have been announced".

On July 23, 2015, The New York Times reported that among various projects, the songwriters were "writing about a dozen new songs" for the Frozen musical.

On February 9, 2016, Disney Theatrical announced that the musical was scheduled to open on Broadway in spring 2018. At that time, Disney also confirmed that several additional people were now part of the musical's creative team, including Timbers as director, as well as Stephen Oremus, Peter Darling, Bob Crowley, and Natasha Katz. Two days later, it was confirmed that the musical would first go through a pre-Broadway tryout in August 2017 at the Denver Center for the Performing Arts. In April 2016, it was reported that Betsy Wolfe had been cast as Elsa, but a Disney spokesperson said on April 26 that no roles have been officially cast.

On April 25, the songwriters mentioned to an interviewer that they were about to head into a developmental lab next week for the musical. Anderson-Lopez explained that while "the movie only has seven-and-a-half songs ... we’ve written about 23" for the musical," in the sense that they doubled the number of original songs and then there are reprises of those. Lopez explained that the musical would follow the same story as the film, but they were adapting all the iconic moments from the film to the musical theatre environment. It was later reported that the musical's first developmental lab was held over two weeks during May 2016 in New York City, with Betsy Wolfe as Elsa, Patti Murin as Anna, Okieriete Onaodowan as Kristoff, and Greg Hildreth as Olaf, and that Iger himself attended the lab at one point. However, Disney had not yet committed to a cast for the Denver tryout production.

On September 27, 2016, Disney announced the new creative team: Michael Grandage is the director and Christopher Oram is the scenic designer. Christopher Gattelli had been previously announced as choreographer. (Alex Timbers and Bob Crowley are no longer involved.) The musical opened on Broadway at the St. James Theatre. On March 11, 2020, the day before Broadway shut down due to the pandemic, the Broadway production closed after 26 previews and 825 performances.

== Podcast ==
On September 27, 2023, a new podcast entitled Frozen: Forces of Nature was released on Wondery, before the first two episodes were released to other podcasting platforms on October 11, 2023.

== Reception ==
=== Box office performance ===
Frozen earned $400.7 million in North America, and an estimated $880 million in other countries, for a worldwide total of $1,280,802,282. Calculating in all expenses, Deadline Hollywood estimated that the film made a profit of over $400 million. It is the sixteenth-highest-grossing film (formerly the fifth-highest at its peak), the third highest-grossing animated film (formerly the highest at its peak), the highest-grossing 2013 film, the third highest-grossing Walt Disney Pictures release, and the tenth highest-grossing film distributed by Disney. The film earned $110.6 million worldwide in its opening weekend. On March 2, 2014, its 101st day of release, it surpassed the $1 billion mark, becoming the eighteenth film in cinematic history, the seventh Disney-distributed film, the fifth non-sequel film, the second Disney-distributed film in 2013 (after Iron Man 3), and the first animated film since Toy Story 3 to do so.

| Film | Release Date | Box Office Gross | | | All Time Ranking | | Budget | References |
| Film | Release Date | Domestic | Foreign | Worldwide | Domestic | Worldwide | Budget | References |
|---|---|---|---|---|---|---|---|---|
| Film | Frozen | November 27, 2013 | $400,738,009 | $880,064,273 | $1,280,802,282 | #39 | #16 | $150 million |
| Film | Frozen 2 | November 22, 2019 | $477,373,578 | $972,653,355 | $1,450,026,933 | #17 | #19 | $150 million |
| Total | | $878,111,587 | $1,852,717,628 | $2,730,829,215 | - | #22 | $300 million | |

=== Critical response ===
| Film | Rotten Tomatoes | Metacritic |
|---|---|---|
| Frozen | 90% (241 reviews) | 74 (43 reviews) |
| Frozen 2 | 77% (312 reviews) | 64 (47 reviews) |
| Olaf's Frozen Adventure | 57% (7 reviews) | |
| Olaf Presents | 100% (5 reviews) | |

== Merchandise ==
During the Walt Disney Company's 2014 first-quarter earnings conference call on February 5, 2014, Iger alluded to "high demand for Frozen merchandise", which was expanded upon by Disney senior executive vice president and chief financial officer Jay Rasulo: "Over the most recent quarter...if I had to pick out a single item, I would say Frozen items were the single most demanded items at Disney Stores." In March 2014, Bloomberg Businessweek reported that Disney had sold almost 500,000 Anna and Elsa dolls, with a 5,000 limited-edition run selling out online in only 45 minutes in January. Demand only increased further after the mid-March home video release; toy industry expert Jim Silver explained home video enabled children to "watch it over and over again" and "fall in love" with the film's characters. Chris Buck mentioned in an April 2014 interview that the directors had not bought anything for themselves "thinking it wouldn't be a problem, and now everything's sold out!" By mid-April, U.S. consumer demand for Frozen merchandise was so high that resale prices for higher-quality limited-edition Frozen dolls and costumes had skyrocketed past $1,000 on eBay, both Disney and its licensees had arranged for air freight to rush fresh inventory to retailers besieged by desperate parents, and some of those parents had begun publicly venting their frustration through social media outlets such as the Disney Store's Facebook page. Fed up with the shortage, some parents took a "do it yourself" approach, and others went for custom-made replicas on crafts sites like Etsy. Similar shortages of Frozen merchandise were reported during spring 2014 in the United Kingdom, Canada, Australia, New Zealand, France, and Singapore.

In a mid-April interview, Disney Store Vice President Jonathan Storey admitted that although Disney had high expectations for the film, "demand went even higher than they thought it ever would." He also promised that more Frozen merchandise would be delivered to Disney Store locations immediately through regular shipments, and that new products were being developed for release throughout the year. By the end of April, Disney Parks had imposed a five-item limit at its stores, while Disney Store had imposed a two-item limit, restricted the release of the most popular items to store opening on Saturday mornings, and required guests to enter into a lottery on those mornings just for the chance to purchase the very popular Elsa costumes.

During The Walt Disney Company's 2014 second-quarter earnings call on May 6, 2014, Iger said Frozen "is definitely up there in terms of, probably, our top five franchises", and that the company will "take full advantage of that over the next at least five years." He also explained Disney was still working on the musical, as well as publishing, interactive, and theme park projects. Rasulo disclosed that nine of the ten best-selling items at Disney Store in the second quarter were Frozen-related.

In response to demand from private art collectors for official Frozen-inspired fine art, the first batch of 10 artworks approved by Disney Fine Art went on sale in May 2014, at an art gallery in Sacramento, California.

A few days earlier, on May 1, 2014, it had been reported that Disney Consumer Products was developing a comprehensive program of new Frozen merchandise for 2014 and 2015, which would include additional role play and plush items as well as "home décor, bath, textile, footwear", sporting goods, consumer electronics, and pool and summer toys (the last two to come in summer 2015). On June 25, 2014, DCP presented a "holiday fair" to journalists in New York City for the 2014 Christmas and holiday season, which included numerous Frozen-related items. MTV News warned parents to prepare to "'[l]et it go,' and by 'it' we mean 'your money.'" In early August, Fortune reported that Frozen could hit $1 billion in merchandise sales just in the U.S. market alone (that is, excluding sales of the actual film itself) by the end of 2014, with about half of that amount coming from toys. Advertising Age reported at the start of September that the Frozen brand would be expanding soon to even more kinds of products, such as backpacks, fruit, juice, yogurt, bandages, and oral care.

On October 9, 2014, Iger acknowledged at a conference on new media in San Francisco that demand for Frozen costumes "has been crazy since the movie came out, crazier than we ever anticipated, because, who knew?" He added that Disney was now "definitely prepared" to meet consumer demand. Around the same time, the National Retail Federation published a survey projecting that Frozen costumes would be the fourth most popular category of children's costumes for Halloween 2014, in that about 2.6 million American children were expected to dress up as Frozen characters. The Fresno Bee estimated that with all the accessories released for Halloween 2014, it would cost about $94 to fully costume a girl as Elsa.

At the start of November, it was reported that the shortage of Frozen merchandise was finally over, and Disney and its licensees had "adapted to a new reality where demand for Frozen merchandise seems unquenchable." Disney announced that it had sold over three million Frozen costumes in North America alone, of which Elsa was the no. 1 best-selling Disney costume of all time, followed by Anna at no. 2. Walmart went into the 2014 Christmas and holiday season with about 700 distinct Frozen-related items of merchandise in stock. Among the Frozen-branded products made available in the U.S. market in late 2014 were duct tape and a version of Monopoly Junior marketed with the tagline, "Whoever collects the most cash will thaw their freezing heart and win". The "Frozen juggernaut" was cited as a major reason for a significant decline during 2014 in sales figures for other toy brands, including Hello Kitty and Barbie. The National Retail Federation's 2014 Holiday Top Toys Survey found that 20 percent of U.S. parents planned to buy Frozen-related merchandise for their girls, compared to only 16.8 percent who planned to buy Barbie merchandise. This meant Frozen toys were the No. 1 item on "holiday wish lists of girls", a position which Barbie had previously held for 11 years. The New York Times reporter Binyamin Appelbaum compared Disney's spectacular success with the Frozen merchandise brand to the pharmaceutical industry, in the sense that the actual consumer of the product is usually not the person who is stuck with the bill: "After all, who wants to say no to their princess?" NPD Group later estimated that Frozen merchandise had brought in $531 million in gross revenue during 2014, meaning that Frozen was the top toy brand of the year.

On February 3, 2015, Disney Consumer Products reported a 22% rise in revenue and a 46% rise in operating income for the quarter ending on December 27, 2014 (as compared to the quarter a year earlier). The largest driver of that growth was Frozen merchandise. During the Walt Disney Company's earnings call on that same date, Frozen was mentioned 24 times, "more than 'Star Wars,' 'The Avengers,' 'Cinderella' and 'Spider-Man' combined." The next day, Disney's stock price jumped 8% in one day to close at a record high of $101.28 per share. The brand's success was only reinforced further on June 9, 2015, when Frozen won multiple awards at the LIMA International Licensing Awards ceremony in Las Vegas, including Overall Best Licensed Program and Film, Television, or Entertainment (Animated) Program. Jakks Pacific's Elsa toy won the award for Film, Television, or Entertainment (Animated) Licensee: Hard Goods (in a tie with Playmates Toys' Teenage Mutant Ninja Turtles), while Kohl's won the Retailer award for its presentation of Frozen products.

== Activities and locations ==
=== Meet-and-greets ===
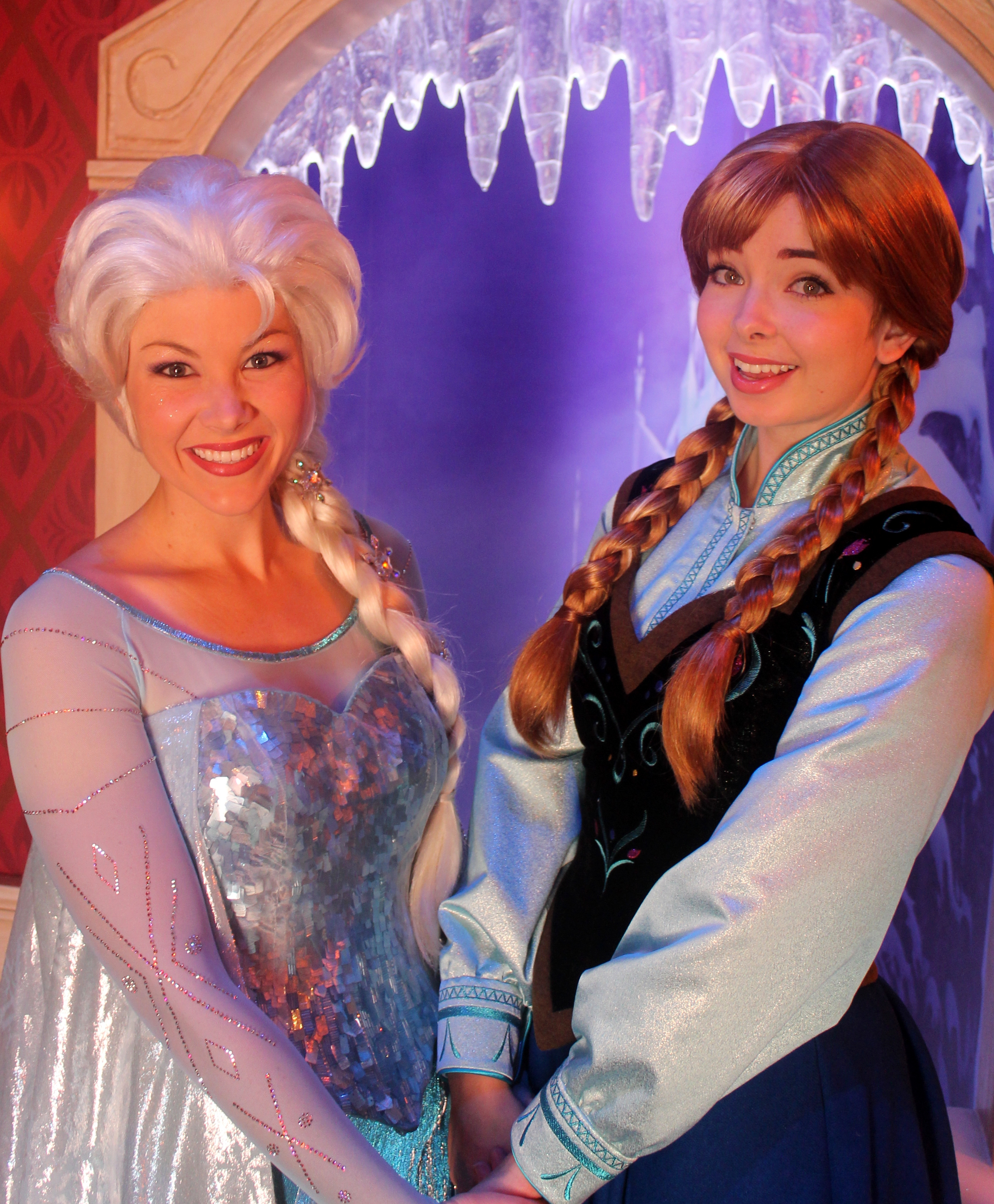
Elsa and Anna doing a Meet and Greet at Disneyland in 2013.

The meet-and-greets with Anna and Elsa at Disneyland and Epcot had been initially sponsored by The Walt Disney Studios as short-term temporary attractions starting from November 2013 to promote the film, but in February 2014, Disney Parks decided to extend them indefinitely in response to unprecedented demand. By the beginning of March, wait time was reportedly as long as four or five hours to see Anna and Elsa, which fueled outside speculation about whether Disney Parks would respond with additional Frozen-specific attractions. After wait times at Norway pavilion in Walt Disney World's Epcot reportedly reached six hours, in mid-April the Anna and Elsa meet-and-greets were finally moved to Princess Fairytale Hall at Magic Kingdom, where park guests could use the new FastPass+ reservation system (part of Disney's MyMagic+ project) to bypass the lengthy wait time. Jezebel.com commented on the phenomenon, "Word has it that those characters are like the Beatles now, attracting large crowds of screaming females." However, as of April 2014, there have not been any plans for Anna and Elsa to join the Disney Princess line-up, though Disney Store confirmed that it was still possible the characters would be added to that franchise in the future. When later asked about the situation with the meet-and-greets, Buck said, "Oh, it's crazy." He saw the four-hour-long line himself during a Disneyland visit in the summer of 2014, and tactfully declined a fellow visitor's suggestion to introduce himself to the huge crowd. In September 2014, a FastPass system was added to the Anna and Elsa meet-and-greet at Disneyland.

In Christmas 2014, Hong Kong Disneyland opened a Frozen meet-and-greet in Fantasyland featuring Anna and Elsa. It requires a reservation ticket (similar to Disney Fastpasses) to meet them due to the high popularity of the film. There was also a puppet show about Olaf's search for summer in Fantasyland.

Meet-and-greets with Anna and Elsa were introduced for the Christmas season in 2014 (mid-November 2014 to early January 2015) at Disneyland Paris in the Princess Pavilion. Reservation tickets were issued each morning for a limited number of slots. Due to queue lengths and poor guest behavior, the meet-and-greets were discontinued in early 2015 and have only returned irregularly, and unannounced, in the Disneyland Hotel.

=== Events and celebrations ===
==== World of Color: Winter Dreams (2013, 2014, 2015) ====
From November 15, 2013, to January 6, 2014, a full-length show titled World of Color: Winter Dreams debuted. Hosted by Olaf (Josh Gad) the show celebrates the winter season with several holiday-themed segments, featuring scenes from Frozen, Toy Story, Bambi, Fantasia, One Hundred and One Dalmatians, Prep & Landing, Secret of the Wings, Tangled, Wreck-It Ralph, Melody Time, Lady and the Tramp, Mickey's Once Upon a Christmas, Beauty and the Beast: The Enchanted Christmas, and various vintage Mickey Mouse shorts. The show incorporates traditional holiday-related music, including Eric Whitacre's "Glow", "Carol of the Bells", "Let it Snow", "It's the Most Wonderful Time of the Year", "I'll Be Home for Christmas", "Believe", "Silent Night", the "Nutcracker Suite", "Jingle Bells", "I Have a Little Dreidel", "Feliz Navidad", "Joy to the World", and "Have Yourself A Merry Little Christmas", as well as Frozen songs, such as "Let It Go" and "In Summer".

In November 2014, World of Color: Winter Dreams opened with a different show than its pilot year. The pre-show segment of Glow has been removed, however its music plays after the post-show segment as exit music. Overall the show faced major rearrangement, such as additional songs from Frozen, including "Love Is an Open Door" and "Do You Want to Build a Snowman?". Additionally the isopar flames were introduced into this show during the "In Summer" sequence.

==== Disney Dreams! of Christmas ====
On November 10, 2013, a holiday version of the Disney Dreams! nighttime spectacular called Disney Dreams! of Christmas debuted in Disneyland Paris as part of the Christmas season. Hosted by Olaf and Anna, the show celebrates the winter season with several holiday-themed segments. The show featured scenes similar to the ones in World of Color: Winter Dreams.

In 2014, the show was revised to include a new pilot as well as the rearrangement and removal of several scenes. New scenes with songs from Frozen were likewise added to the show like "In Summer" and "Love Is an Open Door".

Disney Dreams! of Christmas ran every Christmas season until January 7, 2017. The show returned to Disneyland Park for one night only during the Disneyland Park Celebrations Annual Passholder Party held December 12, 2019.

==== Frozen Fun ====
On July 5, 2014, Disney's Hollywood Studios at Walt Disney World launched a "Frozen Summer Fun" program which was to run through September 1, and which included a daily parade, sing-along show, dance party, and fireworks show; an indoor ice skating rink and a merchandise shop; and Frozen décor throughout the theme park. In response to strong demand, Disney Parks subsequently announced on August 7 that Frozen Summer Fun would be extended to September 28.

On December 5, 2014, the Disneyland Resort announced a "Frozen Fun" event at Disney California Adventure. While some of the attractions were made available starting on December 20, "Frozen Fun" officially began on January 7, 2015. The event included For the First Time in Forever: A Frozen Sing-Along Celebration at the Muppet*Vision 3D theater, "Olaf's Snow Fest" (featuring a meet and greet with Olaf), Wandering Oaken's Trading Post, "Freeze the Night! A Family Dance Party" (temporarily replacing Mad T Party), and "Anna and Elsa's Royal Welcome", a meet-and-greet at the Disney Animation Building (replacing the meet-and-greet in Disneyland Park) as well as lessons on how to draw either Olaf or Marshmallow at the Animation Academy. In addition, Disneyland received a Frozen play at the Fantasy Faire, and an update to the Storybook Land Canal Boats to include the village of Arendelle from the film.

On June 11, 2015, Hong Kong Disneyland launched a "Frozen Fun" event that runs through August 30. The major feature of the event is the "Frozen" Festival Show presented at the Crown Jewel Theatre inside Frozen Village, an area located in the "Black Box" space known as "The Pavilion", between Adventureland and Grizzly Gulch. Also inside Frozen Village is Frozen Festival Square where the meet-and-greet with Olaf, a toboggan ride, and Oaken's Trading Post are located. Other attractions are "Frozen Processional", a meet-and-greet with Anna and Elsa in Fantasyland as well as lessons on how to draw Olaf at the Animation Academy.

==== Anna and Elsa's Frozen Fantasy ====
On January 13, 2015, Tokyo Disneyland presented a winter event based on Frozen. This event featured a Frozen parade and special scenes on Once Upon A Time Castle projection show. The event ended on March 20, 2015.

For the 2017 version of Anna and Elsa's Frozen Fantasy, a new projection mapping and firework show called Frozen Forever premiered. It was directed by Steve Davison.

==== Frozen Celebration ====
On November 19, 2019, Disneyland Paris announced a new winter season based on Frozen and Frozen 2. Frozen Celebration is currently running in both Disneyland Park and the Walt Disney Studios Park from January 11 to May 3, 2020. Headlining Frozen Celebration is Frozen 2: An Enchanted Journey, a parade-show cavalcade on the Central Plaza stage of Disneyland Park. The cavalcade featured a brand-new float featuring the characters in their Frozen 2 costumes and a show featuring songs from both Frozen films, including "Vuelie" (from Frozen) and "Some Things Never Change", "Into the Unknown", "Lost in the Woods", and "When I'm Older" (from Frozen 2).

Included in the season is the new stage show called Frozen: A Musical Invitation that premiered earlier on November 17, 2019, at the Animation Celebration building at the Walt Disney Studios Park. The show mainly focused on the plot of Frozen, with Anna leading the guests and Kristoff to Elsa's ice palace on the North Mountain to surprise her. Frozen: A Musical Invitation featuring songs from Frozen, namely "Reindeer(s) Are Better Than People", "Let It Go", and "Love Is an Open Door". A meet-and-greet with Olaf is also located inside the building. In addition, guests were also given an exclusive preview of Frozen 2 inside the Studio Theater in the Production Courtyard.

Lake Disney in the Disney Village hosted "Magic Over Lake Disney: The Frozen Edition", a new limited nighttime show featuring moving lights, LED screens, fireworks, fountains, and flame jets, as well as music from both Frozen and Frozen 2. The show ran on January 24, 27, and 29, 2020.

=== Disney Cruise Line activities ===
On January 22, 2015, it was announced that in the summer of 2015, Frozen themed activities will be added to select Disney Magic and Disney Wonder itineraries of the Disney Cruise Line. This includes a new Frozen-themed deck party, and, on the Magic, a new Frozen scene added to the Disney Dreams stage show. In addition, Anna, Elsa and other Frozen characters will be doing meet and greets on all the ships.

==== Frozen, A Musical Spectacular ====
A one-hour musical adaptation of Frozen is currently playing in the Walt Disney Theatre on the Disney Wonder cruise ship. The show premiered on November 10, 2016, and replaced Toy Story: The Musical. Frozen, A Musical Spectacular is directed by Tony Award nominee Sheryl Kaller and choreographed by Josh Prince, with scenic design by Jason Sherwood, costume design by Tony winner Paloma Young, lighting design by Rui Rita, projection design by Aaron Rhyne, and puppetry by Michael Curry. While considered the least extravagant, fake snow is included in the climactic scene.

=== Attractions ===
==== Anna & Elsa's Boutique (2014–2017) ====
On August 19, 2014, it was initially announced that Elsa & Anna's Boutique (replacing Studio Disney 365) would open mid-September in Downtown Disney district at the Disneyland Resort. The opening date was later changed to October 6, 2014, and the store name was changed to "Anna & Elsa's Boutique". The location includes products inspired by Anna, Elsa, and Olaf. Anna & Elsa's Boutique promptly drew a line of curious consumers on its first day of operation, although Disney management was reportedly attempting to gauge consumer response before considering similar stores at other Disney locations. In October 2017, the location became the Dream Boutique, themed to all of the Disney princesses.

==== Frozen Ever After ====
On September 12, 2014, Walt Disney World announced that a Frozen attraction is scheduled to open in June 2016 at Epcot's World Showcase in the Norway pavilion, replacing the park's Maelstrom ride. The attraction will feature the kingdom of Arendelle with music and scenes from the film, as well as meet-and-greets with Anna and Elsa. Buck and Lee confirmed in March 2015 that they have been assisting Disney Parks with the new Epcot ride's design. On the attraction, Buck stated "It's going to have real state-of-the-art audio animatronics and it's going to look amazing." In June 2015, it was announced that the attraction's name will be "Frozen Ever After" and will feature the kingdom of Arendelle during its "Winter in Summer" event, which will include appearances by the Snowgies from Frozen Fever, in addition to Anna, Elsa, Kristoff, Sven, Olaf, and Marshmallow. The attraction opened on June 21, 2016.

==== Live at the Hyperion ====
In September 2015, it was announced that Disney California Adventure would receive a Frozen-inspired musical stage show for the park's Hyperion Theater, titled Frozen – Live at the Hyperion. The show premiered on May 27, 2016 and is produced by Walt Disney Creative Entertainment.

==== Fantasy Springs ====
Taking the place of the originally-announced Scandinavia port, Fantasy Springs will be the newest port-of-call at Tokyo DisneySea and features three themed areas attached to the sea: the kingdom of Corona from Tangled, the kingdom of Arendelle from Frozen, and Neverland from Peter Pan. The Frozen area will feature the village of Arendelle and its castle, as well as Elsa's ice palace on the North Mountain. A new dining location inside the Arendelle Castle, as well as an expanded version of the Frozen Ever After attraction from Epcot is expected to be included in the new land. This port-of-call opened on June 6, 2024.

==== World of Frozen (Hong Kong Disneyland and Walt Disney Studios Park) ====
As part of the multi-year expansion to both Hong Kong Disneyland and the Walt Disney Studios Park in Disneyland Paris, both parks received a land based on Frozen. Both lands are set in the kingdom of Arendelle post-Frozen, where Queen Elsa has declared a Summer Snow Day for its citizens. The lands feature an expanded version of the Frozen Ever After attraction from Epcot, as well as new dining locations, meet-and-greets, and shops. Unique to Hong Kong Disneyland's Frozen land is Wandering Oaken's Sliding Sleighs, a sled-based rollercoaster that send guests on a winding journey through Arendelle.

Hong Kong Disneyland's Frozen land opened on November 20, 2023, behind Fantasyland. On the other hand, the Walt Disney Studios Park's Frozen land is expected to open in 2025 alongside the new lake area that will be located behind the current park area.

== Books and comics ==
The publisher Random House initially released five Frozen-related titles for English-speaking markets in conjunction with the film's release. By June 29, 2014, all five ranked among the Nielsen Top 20 bestselling books of 2014 in the U.S. market. By August, those five titles had collectively spent 148 weeks on USA Today's list of the top 150 bestselling books in the United States, and Random House had sold over 8 million Frozen-related books. That month, Random House announced a new series of four books by Erica David to be released in 2015; its first two installments, Anna & Elsa #1: All Hail the Queen and Anna & Elsa #2: Memory and Magic, which extends the plot beyond the events shown in the film as the sisters get to know each other, were released on January 6, 2015. They further plan to release three or four Frozen books a year in the future. In 2014, a Frozen-themed entry in Charles Solomon's "The Art of..." series was also released titled The Art of Frozen, depicting behind the scenes information regarding the film's production, and numerous conceptual artworks that informed the final visual style of the piece. A comic book adaption of Frozen titled Frozen – Graphic Novel was released digitally on July 23, 2014, by Disney Press, and a print version was published by Joe Books on January 27 of the following year.

A Frozen comic book series published by Dark Horse Comics, titled Disney Frozen, was written by Joe Caramagna with art from the Kawaii Creative Studio. It was launched in August 2018.

In author Jen Calonita's book Conceal Don't Feel released in October 2019, the seventh volume of the A Twisted Tale series, the question is explored What if Anna and Elsa never knew each other? In the book, after Elsa uses her ice powers on Anna, she attempts to interfere in the trolls' attempt to erase Anna's memory, but this triggers a kind of curse where not only do Elsa and Anna forget about each other, but Anna will freeze to death if she is brought into close proximity with Elsa. In order to save their lives, the king and queen have Anna sent to live with old friends of their mother who own a bakery in a distant village. After her parents die, Elsa begins to remember Anna and goes on a journey to reunite with her sister, hampered by factors such as Prince Hans (set up by the Duke of Weselton as a friend for Elsa who intends to become king only for this plan to fail as Elsa never sees Hans as more than a friend).

Frozen 2: Forest of Shadows was released by author Kamilla Benko on October 4, 2019. This book deals with a mysterious sickness striking the kingdom of Arendelle and Elsa and Anna going to search for the cure to the illness immediately before the events of Frozen 2.

A prequel novel entitled Frozen 2: Dangerous Secrets: The Story of Iduna and Agnarr by author Mari Mancusi was released on November 3, 2020. The events of the book primarily take place prior to the events of the first Frozen film, and tell the backstory of Queen Iduna and King Agnarr, how they met, and their relationship prior to the birth of Elsa and Anna.

== Brand extension ==
=== Frozen Northern Lights ===
Frozen Northern Lights
- Owner: The Walt Disney Company

Print publications
- Books: Journey to the Lights (2016); Kristoff's Crystal Adventure (2016); Oaken's Invention (2016); Our Adventure Notebook (2016); Let It Glow (2017)

Films and television
- Short film: 4 LEGO Frozen Northern Lights complimentary shorts
- Television special: LEGO Frozen Northern Lights (2016)

Disney launched a franchise extension called Frozen Northern Lights in 2016. This brand extension includes animated shorts, book series and a TV special, plus potential characterized toys courtesy of LEGO Friends.

The extension's book series launched the extension on July 5, 2016, with its first book, Journey to the Lights, published by Random House by author Suzanne Francis and is 224 pages in length. The film's main characters attempt to restore the Northern Lights' glimmer and face Little Rock, the series' new protagonist.

A spin-off collection of four shorts developed by LEGO aired on Disney Channel, titled:

1. Race to Lookout Mountain (a.k.a. Race to Lookout Point)
2. Out of the Storm
3. The Great Glacier
4. Restoring the Northern Lights

They later aired as a whole on December 9, 2016. Titled LEGO Frozen Northern Lights (also known as Frozen: Magic of the Northern Lights in the UK and Lego Frozen Northern Nights elsewhere), the shorts were compiled as a special and featured the returning voice talents of Kristen Bell, Idina Menzel, Jonathan Groff, and Josh Gad. The special received 2.01 million viewers and ranked fifth for the night on cable.
