= Lost in the Woods =

Song by Jonathan Groff

from the album Frozen II
- Released: November 15, 2019
- Genre: Soft rock; glam rock
- Length: 3:01
- Label: Walt Disney
- Songwriters: Kristen Anderson-Lopez; Robert Lopez
- Producers: Anderson-Lopez; Lopez; David Metzger; Tom MacDougall

"Lost in the Woods" is a song written by Kristen Anderson-Lopez and Robert Lopez for Disney's animated film Frozen 2 (2019), the sequel to the 2013 animated film. It was recorded by American actor and singer Jonathan Groff, who voices the character Kristoff, and produced by its songwriters with Dave Metzger and Tom MacDougall. The song was released by Walt Disney Records on November 15, 2019, as part of the film's soundtrack album. "Lost in the Woods" is a soft rock and glam rock ballad about relationship insecurities. Featuring piano keyboards and distorted electric guitars prominently throughout, the song's production and instrumentation distinguish it from the film's other musical numbers.

Due to Kristoff's non-musical personality, Groff hardly sings in the first Frozen film despite his musical theatre experience, which disappointed fans and critics. Anderson-Lopez and Lopez decided Kristoff's first proper song should depict him learning how to express his emotions for the first time, specifically how he feels about his girlfriend Anna, to whom he has been struggling to propose. "Lost in the Woods" ultimately replaced a duet that had been written for Kristoff and Anna. The songwriters were heavily inspired by rock songs and bands from the 1980s, specifically power ballads performed by male singers who were unafraid to express their innermost feelings through song, and cited musicians Bryan Adams and Jon Bon Jovi as inspirations. Groff provided all of the song's background vocals himself, recording at least 18 different vocal tracks. Delivered in a tongue-in-cheek manner, "Lost in the Woods" is both a sincere expression of Kristoff's feelings and parody of 1980s music; the song's accompanying musical sequence in the film was animated to resemble music videos from the same time period.

Most film and music critics have reviewed the song positively, praising its 1980s-inspired production, humor, and Groff's performance, while declaring it a standout among Frozen II's songs. Several reviewers commented on the song's appeal to older Frozen fans. American rock band Weezer recorded a cover of the song for the film's end credits, the release of which was accompanied by a music video starring actress Kristen Bell, who voices Anna, as lead singer Rivers Cuomo's love interest.

== Background ==
American actor and singer Jonathan Groff voices the character Kristoff, a reclusive mountaineer and ice harvester, in the Frozen films. Despite being an accomplished Broadway performer in his own right with extensive musical theatre experience, Groff barely sings in the first film, apart from his character's brief solo "Reindeer(s) Are Better Than People". Several critics and fans complained about the actor's lack of musical performances in Frozen, widely criticizing the film for failing to use his talents properly. Frozen songwriters Kristen Anderson-Lopez and Robert Lopez admitted they will always be ashamed of not writing a proper song for Groff or his character, acknowledging it as a missed opportunity.

Screen Rant's Kay McGuire reported that Disney has attributed Kristoff's lack of a song in Frozen to his characterization, explaining that a complete musical number would have been inappropriate for the character's personality and role in the film since, for the most part, he is "not the kind of character to break into song". Although the songwriters, filmmakers and cast agreed that Groff does not sing nearly enough in the first film, the actor admitted that his fans were more disappointed by the oversight than he was. According to Vanity Fair's Joanna Robinson, both the songwriters and Groff struggled to understand how his character could sing an entire song in the sequel without merely "shoehorn[ing] in a song" with little plot relevance.

Ultimately, the songwriters decided Kristoff's song should revolve around an emotionally repressed man finally being able to express his feelings for the first time in the form of a 1980s Power Ballad, resulting in a funny yet emotional moment for the character's development. The song was inspired by Kristoff's tendency to convey his innermost thoughts via Sven, his pet reindeer, an unusual personality trait first established in Frozen that ultimately becomes "Kristoff's way of expressing his deep, deep emotional feelings", according to Groff. McGuire theorized that, by Frozen II, Kristoff is much more comfortable with his emotions, which in turn legitimizes the character having a musical number.

== Writing and recording ==
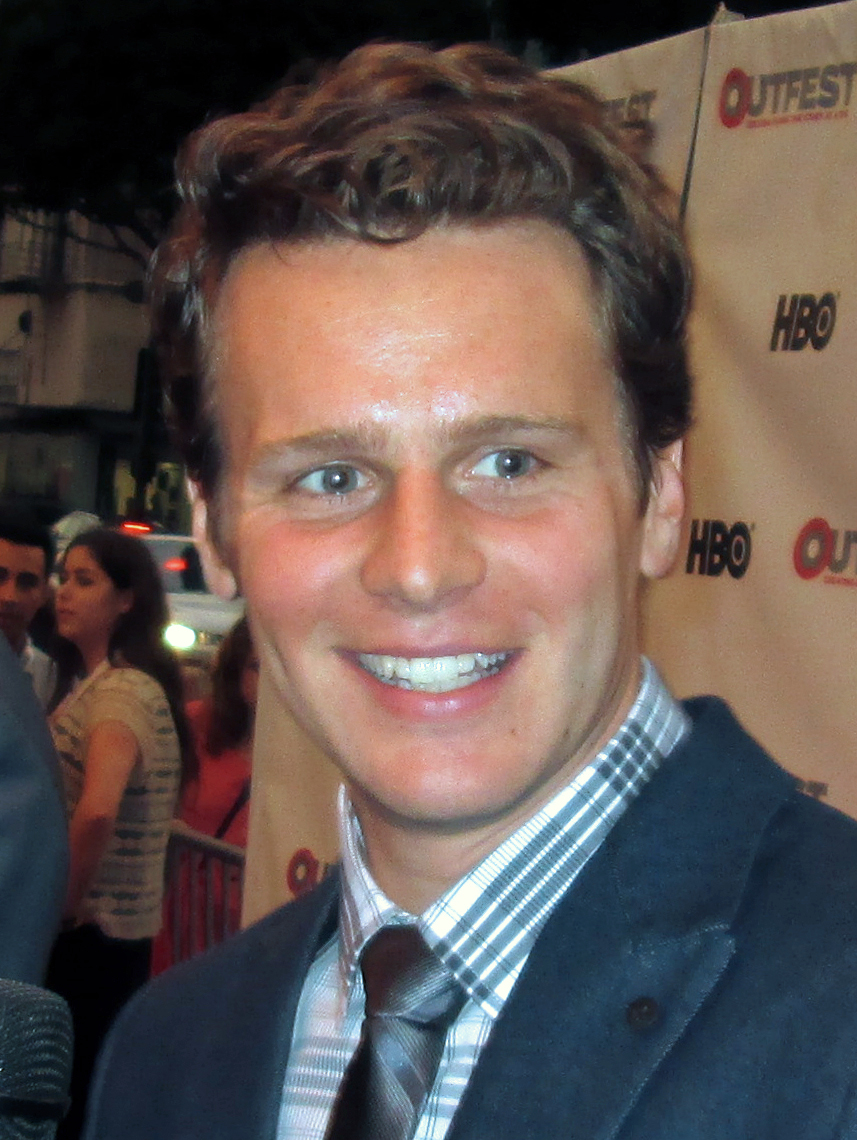
Frozen was widely criticized for hardly using actor Jonathan Groff's singing voice.

"Lost in the Woods" was written by Anderson-Lopez and Lopez, who researched several classic rock bands as inspiration for the song. Heavily inspired by the songwriters' love for 1980s music, Anderson-Lopez described the song as an "homage to a time when men could express their feelings in a big, powerful way", and were particularly inspired by singers Bryan Adams and Jon Bon Jovi. The songwriters believe this emotional style of singing has "decreased in popularity" since the 1980s, and hoped "Lost in the Woods" would help revive it. Since they were both teenagers during the 1980s, the songwriters incorporated "every emo emotion we ever had" during their adolescence into the song's lyrics. "Lost in the Woods" was primarily written to convey Kristoff, a "buttoned-up mountain man", truly voicing his innermost feelings for the first time, while expanding upon the idea that he longs for a committed relationship with Anna. "Lost in the Woods" replaced an earlier song entitled "Get This Right", which had originally been intended as a comedic duet between the couple. Having never written a song like "Lost in the Woods" before, the songwriting duo found the process both risky and thrilling.

Upon hearing "Lost in the Woods" for the first time, Groff was surprised to learn Disney was willing to explore "such a left turn" for his character musically, and feared the song would be cut from the final film due to its jarring nature. Groff and the songwriters discussed the need to "[toe] the line between emotion and camp" to deliver a funny yet sincere performance, explaining that, despite appearing funny to modern audiences, similar songs from the 1980s are "not making a joke ... it was a more innocent time. And there was a purity to it that we sort of laugh at now, but that purity is also actually what the character is feeling". Anderson-Lopez agreed that they had decided to base the song on 1980s music so they could "have fun" while maintaining a level of sincerity.

To ensure Groff was in an appropriate mood to record "Lost in the Woods" on the day of the recording, the team watched several YouTube videos of balladeers from the 1980s in preparation. Groff also drew inspiration from karaoke, specifically recalling memories of drunken men singing songs by the bands Journey and Queen. Groff provided all of the track's background vocals himself, recording at least 18 different vocal tracks for Kristoff, Sven and several reindeer characters. Groff's background vocals were intentionally mixed to sound as though each character was singing from a slightly different location. Anderson-Lopez described the background vocals as a hybrid between the bands Queen and Chicago, which were also inspired by their background as a cappella singers.

Lopez and Anderson-Lopez produced the track with Dave Metzger and Tom MacDougall. Disney revealed the full track list for the Frozen II soundtrack on September 30, 2019, in which both the film and end credit versions of "Lost in the Woods" are mentioned. "Lost in the Woods" was released along with the film's soundtrack on November 15, 2019, with the deluxe version including an instrumental rendition of the track. The process of writing and recording the song is documented in the documentary series Into the Unknown: Making Frozen II, serving as the main focus of its second episode "Back to the Drawing Board".

== Context ==
=== Background and use in Frozen II ===
The songwriters encouraged Frozen II's animators to "take this to an '80s video kind of place', which they had deliberately written on the song's lyric sheet. Like the song itself, its animated sequence is inspired by rock ballads from the 1980s, which directors Chris Buck and Jennifer Lee researched diligently to ensure their visuals complimented the songwriters' vision. The entire musical sequence was storyboarded by story artist Dan Abraham, while the idea of a reindeer chorus was suggested by various animators. At times, the directors felt Abraham's ideas for Kristoff's performance were too "extreme", which at some points had depicted the character cartwheeling and ripping his shirt off, thus Buck and Lee advised the animator to keep Kristoff's antics more grounded. Kristoff's supervising animator Justin Sklar found the scene particularly difficult to animate, admitting that animators instinctively want to create "the craziest" and most ridiculous version of any project they are assigned to, which does not always benefit the sequence. Sklar initially struggled to balance the scene's humor with Kristoff's "sincere performance", while at the same time granting the audience permission to laugh at how he expresses himself. According to Sklar, the final version of "Lost in the Woods" is significantly "less crazy" than earlier iterations, which evolved considerably throughout the development process. Of the scenes he has animated for Frozen II, Sklar considers "Lost in the Woods" to be his favorite. Animating and emoting dozens of reindeer also proved challenging for Sven's supervising animator Michael Woodside, since the animals had never spoken for themselves before "Lost in the Woods".

Kristoff struggles to propose to his longtime girlfriend Anna during most of Frozen II, with a subplot revolving around him constantly failing to ask Anna to marry him. Anderson-Lopez explained that both characters belong to opposite worlds, which inevitably results in communication issues between the couple. The song is immediately preceded by Sven singing "you feel what you feel and your feelings are real", a brief reprise of "Reindeer(s) Are Better Than People", which Anderson-Lopez identified as the scene's most important part. According to Brian Tuitt of USA Today, Sven's introduction encourages Kristoff to "Let your guard down and let your feelings out", which Anderson-Lopez hoped would help young boys confront toxic masculinity. Actress Kristen Bell, who voices Anna, concurred that Kristoff's song offers young boys a positive example of a grown man expressing "big feelings", which she believes they do not see represented on screen often.

"Lost in the Woods" takes place approximately one-third of the way into the film when Kristoff and Anna become separated, the latter choosing to pursue her sister Elsa deeper into the Enchanted Forest. Kristoff has just accidentally proposed to Yelena, leader of the Northuldra tribe, whose silhouette he has mistaken for Anna's. While Anna chooses to prioritize herself and Elsa, Kristoff remains behind to contemplate "his feelings of frustration and feelings of repressed love". Serving as Kristoff's "I Want" song, the character sings about feeling left behind by Anna's decision to embark on an adventure without him, discovering that much of his identify is dependent on her. Unsure how Anna feels about him, Kristoff sings about his vulnerability. Surrounded by several reindeer providing background vocals, Kristoff channels his anguish into the ballad, voicing his frustration about their relationship. Its "intentionally cheesy" musical sequence is reminiscent of music videos from the 1980s, according to Jocelyn Noveck of the Associated Press, featuring tight, slow-motion closeups of Kristoff singing and dancing, Anna crossfading into their surroundings, Kristoff singing into a pine cone in lieu of a studio microphone, and the character's face being superimposed into various scenes. Kristoff is also surrounded by a reindeer chorus in a scene referencing "Bohemian Rhapsody" by the band Queen, as well as the boy band the Backstreet Boys. The song's humorous lyrics are bolstered by the scene's equally comical choreography and animation. By the end of the musical number, Kristoff has finally succumbed to his feelings, demonstrating a sense of ownership over his emotions.

=== Interpretations ===
Syfy writer Courtney Enlow observed that each main character experiences an identify crisis in Frozen II, with Kristoff becoming lost both "in the woods" and his relationship. As one of the few prominent male characters in Frozen II, Kristoff is essentially a sidekick to the film's female leads. 411Mania's Jeffrey Harris felt the song helps justify the character's inclusion in the film by acknowledging that he feels left out by Anna's preoccupation with Elsa. Disney films typically do not feature 1980s-inspired power ballads. Despite being a tonal departure from the film's more earnest musical moments, Groff felt the song's comedic treatment would help Kristoff's emotional proclamations be more palatable to young boys. He explained, "Normally you're seeing the girl pining over the guy singing an emotional ballad ... And in this one Anna goes off to go on a huge adventure and they've inverted it. Now it's giving the boys the opportunity to feel their feelings and sing about whatever is going on for them". Groff considers this to be a positive message encouraging young boys to express themselves, similar to the way in which Elsa's "Let It Go" from Frozen had encouraged young girls. "Lost in the Woods" is also the film's only love song. Sarah El-Mahmoud of CinemaBlend observed that although some previous Disney films had featured solos for their male leads, they are typically about their personal journeys instead of love. Similarly, Romper's Jen McGuire expressed that previous Disney songs performed by men had largely been about "succeeding in life and being the champion", seldom allowing "for the complicated emotions of feeling deep love stuff for another person and feeling unsure if those feelings are returned".

The scene's humor is largely self-referential and tongue-in-cheek, incorporating several music video clichés, such as wind-swept hair and split-screens reminiscent of a variety show. The sequence also embodies the anachronistic tone of voice used throughout both Frozen films, being one of only several pop culture references the film contains. Groff described the scene as truly a "gift" to adult Frozen fans, believing adults are more likely to understand the scene's references to the time period it parodies. The Daily Bruin's Paige Hua observed that the song's self-aware tone "services a more millennial audience".

== Music and lyrics ==
"Lost in the Woods" is a soft rock power ballad about love, longing, and relationship insecurities, heavily inspired by 1980s music. Dana Barbuto of The State Journal-Register called the ballad "a slow-rock song straight out of the '80s". The song also draws upon elements of glam rock, power pop, yacht-rock, pop, rock-gospel, and rock opera, as well as boy band music from the 1980s and 1990s. Film critic Robbie Collin of The Daily Telegraph described the track as "an affectionate send-up of Nineties boyband angst pop". Written in the key of A-flat major and performed at a slow tempo of 70 beats per minute, the song lasts three minutes and one second in duration.

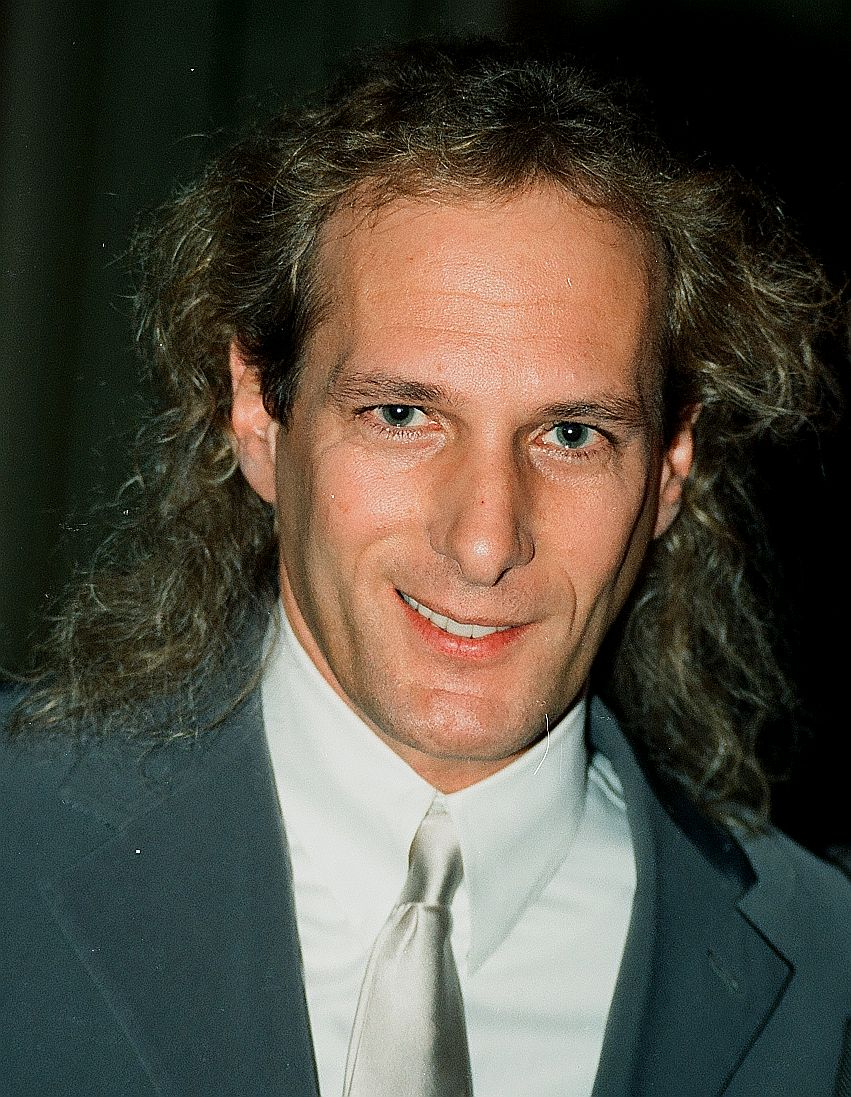
The song's production and Groff's vocals were constantly compared to the work of singer Michael Bolton (pictured), among other artists.

Musically, "Lost in the Woods" is a significant departure from Frozen II's other songs, most of which are inspired by musical theatre and show tunes. Beginning with an electric guitar riff, instrumentation includes piano keyboards and distorted electric guitars, the latter of which Lopez described as a quintessential trademark of the decade. Containing phrasing and instrumentation also emblematic of the same time period, the song's production swells as it approaches its first chorus, where it is joined by Groff's harmonies. Despite heavy instrumentation, the ballad remains focused on Groff's vocals and harmonies, which are prominently featured throughout the track. Groff belts the melody in a manner Vulture's Jackson McHenry described as "slightly overcooked". In addition to parodying the time period by which it was inspired, Screen Rant's Matt Berger felt the track also lampoons ballads from the original Frozen film.

"Lost in the Woods"'s production and instrumentation have been compared to the works of several musical acts who were popular during the 1980s, such as singers Bryan Adams, Michael Bolton, Peter Cetera, Elton John, Meat Loaf, and Richard Marx, and the bands Air Supply, Chicago and Journey. Johnny Oleksinski of the New York Post cited influences of country music, comparing the ballad to the work of singer-songwriter Carly Simon. Remarking upon the song's 1980s authenticity, Michael Ordoña of the Los Angeles Times joked that "[producer] David Foster may demand a DNA test", while according The Daily Nebraskan's Libby Schilz, its instrumentation "provides a grandiose, orchestral sonic landscape ... creating a soundscape reminiscent of Elton John and REO Speedwagon's 'I Can't Fight This Feeling'". Sabrina Rojas Weiss of Cosmopolitan summarized the song as a "mashup of every single sad rock song of the '80s we can think of". The Austin Chronicle's Kimberly Jones labeled its production a "melting pot" of influences, combining 1980s synths and instrumentation with "Nineties boy band choreography".

The song's lyrics begin "Again, you're gone", and discuss themes about growing apart and feeling lost without one's significant other, who is on a separate journey. Confused about their whereabouts, the singer confesses "Now I turn around and find/ I am lost in the woods/ North is south, right is left ... When you're gone/ I'm the one who sees you home/ But now I'm lost in the woods/ And I don't know what path you are on/ I'm lost in the woods". Feeling "lost in the emotional landscape of a relationship" as described by Kristin Kranz of Hypable, Groff expresses "forlorn" sentiments such as "Who am I? If I'm not your guy". Groff sighs the line "You're my only landmark, so I'm lost in the woods', lyrics Jocelyn Noveck of the Associated Press described as "angsty". Erik Kain of Forbes pegged the track as an over-the-top "heartbreak ballad" about being "ditched by [one's] girl". According to Us Weekly's Mara Reinstein, the song's lyrics are tongue-in-cheek about pining another's love, while the Los Angeles Times film critic Justin Chang quipped that the singer "basically admits he needs directions". The Mary Sue's Jessica Mason observed that the ballad remains "a sincere expression of insecurity about a relationship and being left behind", despite such sentiments being expressed in a funny, cheesy manner.

== Reception ==
=== Critical response ===
"Lost in the Woods" has received mostly positive reviews from both entertainment critics and fans. Lex Goodman of PureWow reported that the audience applauded and cheered for the song during the Frozen II premiere. Many critics suggested the song could become as popular as "Let it Go" from Frozen. Several reviewers, such as TheWrap's Alonso Duralde, deemed "Lost in the Woods" the film's best song and a standout among its musical numbers. Recognizing the song as a highlight of the sequel, the Associated Press critic Jocelyn Noveck crowned "Lost in the Woods" the film's "true heir to 'Let it Go,' at least in terms of its addictiveness". Writing for The Daily Nebraskan, Libby Schilz said "Groff shines" throughout the song, calling the track a catchy, "heralding demonstration of his vocal talent". Jackson McHenry of Vulture named "Lost in the Woods" Frozen II's best song while praising Groff's performance as some of his finest work. McHenry theorized that more musical films could benefit from entertaining, character-driven songs like "Lost in the Woods" instead of "epic, pop-adjacent ballads". Agreeing that the ballad is a musical highlight, BBC Online called its inclusion "an absolute treat". WRAL's Demetri Ravanos said the song proves that Frozen's songwriters are superior to "the rest of Disney's go-to songwriters". Calling the ballad one of the film's smartest creative decisions, Amanda Prahl of BroadwayWorld praised Groff's performance while declaring the track a "better use of his voice than 'Reindeer(s) Are Better Than People'". Matt Rooney of JoBlo.com suggested "Lost in the Woods" could become a fan favorite, writing that Groff "has the pipes to make it a worthy ballad to stand alongside 'Into the Unknown'". Billboard contributor Rania Aniftos dubbed the musical sequence one of the film's most iconic, while The Mary Sue's Princess Weekes called it "visually satisfying". CinemaBlend's Eric Eisenberg found the musical number an excellent and welcome opportunity for Frozen II's animators to express their creativity. 411Mania's Jeffrey Harris declared the song a show-stealer, describing it as "absolutely hilarious" and undoubtedly "The best song in the movie".

"Lost in the Woods' is a chance for Lopez and Anderson-Lopez to once again stretch their comedic muscles as songwriters ... Though Kristoff's love for Anna is real, and his frustration at not being able to put a ring on her finger genuine, "Lost in the Woods' is a hilarious throwback to the power ballads of the 1980s, down to how the song is visualized like a music video that might have featured a hair-metal band doing a slow number. Groff is, of course, an accomplished singer so he's belting it out no matter what. But the animators get to play around as much as the song itself does, mimicking '80s music-video styling to hilarious effect. It's a perfect blend of animation and music, with modern flair.

— Review from The Hollywood Reporter

Critics agreed that "Lost in the Woods" is one of the film's funniest moments and praised its humor, with Dana Barbuto of The State Journal-Register calling it a "fun surprise". Noah Levine of The Daily Texan encouraged readers to forget about "Let it Go'" in favor of "Lost in the Woods', calling the latter "a hilarious homage to retro love songs". Writing for the British Film Institute, Kate Stables appreciated the song for contributing "three minutes of uncomplicated pleasure" to an otherwise somber film. Similarly, David Sims of The Atlantic said the campy song "helps to lighten up a plot that's otherwise weighed down by elaborate exposition", which he compared to the work of Jim Steinman, while Josh Spiegel of /Film said the song "toe[s] the line between being too referential and just slyly funny enough". NDTV contributor Akhil Arora called the song a "deliberately cheesy and campy" hoot. Writing for TheSagOnline, Phoebe Kallaher identified "Lost in the Woods" as the film's only memorable musical moment, reporting that it "had every age group in the audience rollicking with laughter". Other critics, such as Sarah Harris of the Deseret News, deemed "Lost in the Woods" the best Frozen song for adult fans. Matt Singer of ScreenCrush agreed, elaborating, "Parents will appreciate the care put into mimicking old music videos' goofiest impulses". Although The New York Observer's Oliver Jones observed that the musical number was very well-received by fellow adult audience viewers upon watching the film in theaters for the first time, he could not decipher if at least some of the scene's cheesiness was unintentional. Jones also found the song's particular style of meta-humour more appropriate for a DreamWorks animated film than Disney. Despite ranking "Lost in the Woods" the second most likely Frozen II song to be repeatedly sung by children, Sam Brooks of The Spinoff nicknamed it the soundtrack's "drunk adult song", predicting it would be more popular among adults and karaoke fans. The Los Angeles Times reporter Nardine Saad said children will still find the song's "over-the-top elements and reindeer" amusing, despite its adult appeal.

Some reviews were more tepid. Annlee Ellingson of the American City Business Journals agreed that "Lost in the Woods" is the sequel's musical highlight, despite feeling it lacks the earworm potential to rival "Let it Go". Collider's Matt Goldberg found the track catchy but inferior to "Let it Go". The Maui Time Weekly's Barry Wurst II, who was otherwise unimpressed with Frozen II's soundtrack, deemed "Lost in the Woods" its best song, despite describing its lyrics as unmemorable. Filmtracks.com described the ballad as "mildly amusing even if it really badly pushes the film away from its fantasy core". Vox writer Aja Romano admitted that they found "Lost in the Woods" generic upon subsequent re-listens despite initially selecting it as the film's best song, believing the ballad could be performed by any Frozen II character. Romano explained this "is great if you want a song to be a pop hit, but disappointing as a character-builder for Kristoff". Romano also found the song's production out of place. Simran Hans of The Guardian dismissed "Lost in the Woods" as "forgettable", while Petrana Radulovic of Polygon remarked that the song "would be absolutely hilarious if it didn't stall the movie for three minutes". Writing for Forbes, Erik Kain felt the musical number ultimately "falls flat thanks to the poor build-up and shoddy writing". Kimberly Jones of The Austin Chronicle offered a negative review, describing "Lost in the Woods" as a "low point" and its lyrics as "numbingly straightforward" and "bereft of wit". Sam Adams, writing for Slate, opined that "Lost in the Woods" being the film's best moment is actually "not a great sign", fearing younger viewers would not understand the scene's retro references. Cassie Maz of WPTS-FM dismissed the song as a disappointment, writing, "At best, it's a parody of sappy love songs. At worst, it's an odd boyband homage with talking reindeer that makes you think 'What the heck am I watching?'", believing the scene serves as little more than "a meme that's there for laughs instead of plot or character development".

=== Accolades ===
Syfy selected the track as their "Chosen One of the Day", with author Courtney Enlow penning an entire article celebrating Groff having earned a proper solo and its use of a reindeer choir. Adam Chitwood of Collider ranked "Lost in the Woods" the best song from Frozen II, calling it "quite possibly the best moment in all of Frozen II" and arguably superior to "Let it Go". Evoke.ie ranked "Lost in the Woods" the best song on Frozen II's soundtrack, with writer Olivia Fahy calling it a "standout moment" and "proper bop". Matt Berger of Screen Rant named "Lost in the Woods" the second-best song from the film, calling it both "hilariously catchy" and effective for character development. USA Today's Brian Truitt ranked "Lost in the Woods" the fourth-best Frozen II song. Despite declaring "Lost in the Woods" Frozen II's fifth-best song, the Los Angeles Times reporter Nardine Saad agreed that it is "the funniest song of the film". Michael Ordoña of the Los Angeles Times included the song on their list of potential Academy Award for Best Original Song contenders from 2019.

Marisa LaScala of Good Housekeeping ranked "Lost in the Woods" the 36th best Disney song of all-time, citing it as an example of Frozen II excelling when songwriters try new genres. In a listicle selecting the best song from 25 animated Disney films, Nevada Sports Net's Chris Murray appreciated the song's 1980s influence and that it is not performed by Idina Menzel. Contrastingly, Jasmine Venegas of Comic Book Resources ranked "Lost in the Woods" Disney's eighth worst animated Disney song, writing that its "odd backup vocals from reindeer and recycled animation from the love interests' short time together made the song fall flat".

In 2021, Hallmark released a musical Christmas tree ornament inspired by the song, which depicts Kristoff wistfully posing underneath a tree.

== Credits and personnel ==
Credits adapted from Spotify:

- Jonathan Groff – vocals, background vocals
- Kristen Anderson-Lopez – songwriting, production
- Robert Lopez – songwriting, production
- Dave Metzger – production
- Tom MacDougall – production

== Weezer version ==
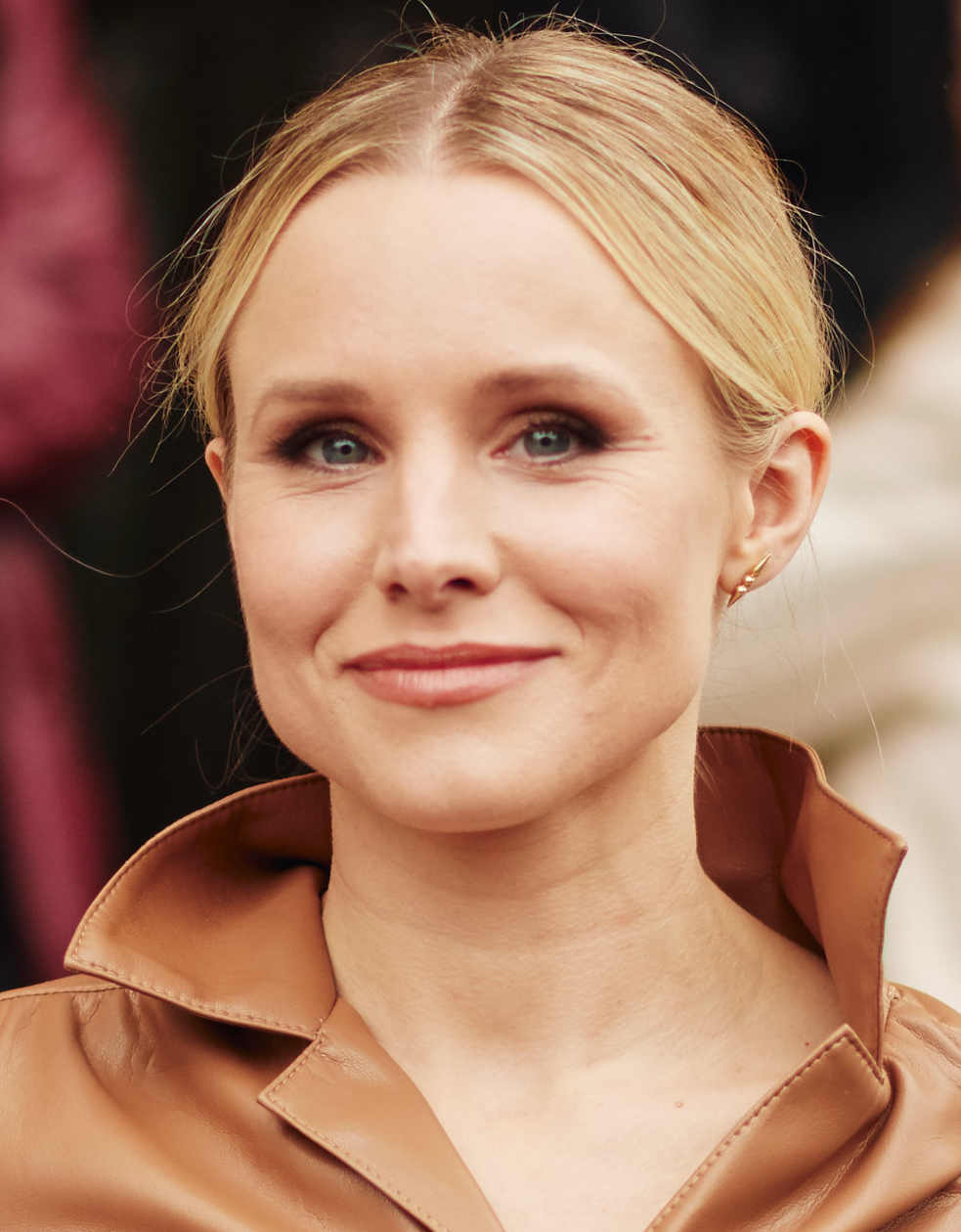
Actress Kristen Bell appears in the music video for Weezer's cover of "Lost in the Woods".

American band Weezer recorded a cover of "Lost in the Woods" for Frozen II's soundtrack, which also plays during the film's end credits. The cover was produced by Weezer and Jake Sinclair, and engineered by Suzy Shinn, Rachel White and Will Carroll. Lopez played the keyboard, jokingly coining himself the band's newest member. At the time, the cover's release coincided with Weezer's trend of releasing child-friendly material towards the end of 2019.

The cover received mostly positive reviews. Comparing it to the work of Queen, Spin's Rob Arcand said the song "pairs soaring, distorted guitar lines with Cuomo's schoolboy voice" before it eventually "return[s] to strictly Weezer territory, with palm-muted guitar and interlocking vocal harmonies". Also comparing the track to songs by Queen albeit "without Freddie Mercury's over-the-top vocal presence", Chris DeVille of Stereogum described the cover as an "arena-rock track" that ultimately remains "unmistakably a Weezer song". Entertainment Weekly's Tyler Aquilina opined that although "Weezer's pop-punk sound probably isn't what most people think of when they think of Disney ... that sound is very well-suited" to "Lost in the Woods". Vanity Fair's Joanna Robinson agreed that "Lost in the Woods" sounds a lot like a Weezer track, congratulating its writers for unknowingly writing a Weezer song. Jason Fraley of WTOP predicted that the cover will appease alternative rock fans, while Good Housekeeping's Marisa LaScala found it "pretty good". Chuck Campbell of the Knoxville News Sentinel described the rendition as "quintessentially Weezer". Redbox contributor Erika Olson hoped the band would perform the song live. However, The Spinoff's Sam Brooks dismissed the cover entirely, writing they "refuse to devote words to" it.

Weezer released a music video to accompany their cover on December 6, 2019, in which Bell appears as lead singer Rivers Cuomo's love interest. The music video is essentially a "shot-by-shot recreation of the scene" from the film. The video features Cuomo performing the song while exploring the Enchanted Forest and reminiscing about Bell's character, who is wearing Anna's costume. Bell's character constantly disappears during the video. Cuomo wears a fur coat reminiscent of Kristoff, while their surroundings and environment are various shades of lavender and neon. Similar to Kristoff, the singer also sings into a hanging pine cone as though it were a microphone. The rest of the band is also dressed in medieval attire inspired by Frozen.

== Certifications ==
Region	Certification	Certified units/sales
United Kingdom (BPI)	Gold	400,000^{‡}
United States (RIAA)	Platinum	1,000,000^{‡}
^{‡} Sales+streaming figures based on certification alone.
