= Into the Unknown: Making Frozen 2 =

2020 documentary series

- Genre: Documentary
- Directed by: Megan Harding
- Country of origin: United States
- Original language: English
- No. of series: 1
- No. of episodes: 6

Production
- Executive producers: Amy Astley; Jeanmarie Condon
- Production location: United States
- Running time: 29-44 minutes
- Production company: The Walt Disney Company

Original release
- Network: Disney+
- Release: June 26, 2020

Into the Unknown: Making Frozen 2 is a 2020 documentary series about Disney's 2019 animated film Frozen 2. Its six episodes follow the production crew and voice actors of Frozen 2 in the film's final year of development. This includes the story development and reworking of the song "Show Yourself", the variety of different roles in the animation process, the songwriting and orchestral arrangements, and the post-production process. It was directed by Megan Harding, who was previously involved with a 2014 documentary on the making of the 2013 film Frozen, and released on the streaming service Disney+.

The documentary was produced by Lincoln Square Productions. Harding aimed to represent the production process honestly and the crew filmed for 115 days. They frequently flew between New York City, where they worked, and Los Angeles, where Frozen 2 was produced at Walt Disney Animation Studios, with some additional filming at the homes of individual crew members. The series received positive critical reception.

== Cast ==
=== Production crew ===
- Chris Buck, director
- Jennifer Lee, screenwriter and director
- Kristen Anderson-Lopez, songwriter
- Robert "Bobby" Lopez, songwriter
- Peter Del Vecho, producer
- Michael Giaimo, production designer
- Malerie Walters, animator
- David Metzger, song arranger and orchestrator, score orchestrator

=== Voice actors ===
- Kristen Bell, voice actor for Anna
- Idina Menzel, voice actor for Elsa
- Josh Gad, voice actor for Olaf
- Jonathan Groff, voice actor for Kristoff
- Sterling K. Brown, voice actor for Lieutenant Mattias, an Arendelle soldier
- Evan Rachel Wood, voice actor for Queen Iduna, the mother of Anna and Elsa

== Production ==
In 2014, Australian filmmaker Megan Harding met the main production crew of the 2013 Disney film Frozen while working on a television special for American Broadcasting Company (ABC) a year after the film's release. Production on the sequel Frozen 2 began in 2014. In December 2018, working with Lincoln Square Productions, Harding began documenting its filmmaking process. She and most of the crew flew between New York City, where they worked, and Los Angeles for the majority of filming. Covering the last year of production, the crew recorded 1,300 hours of footage across 115 days of shooting. The local crew filmed the Lopezes from their New York City apartment, and footage of their meetings with other production crew was variously captured from one or both sides of the conversation or from the teleconferencing technology directly.

Harding aimed to represent the process honestly and detail "the personal investment and creative struggle", rather than making "a DVD extra". The crew had to select aspects of the production to focus on, such as the development of "Show Yourself". Harding did not plan to include mention of Buck's loss of his son Ryder, but Buck brought it up himself, unexpectedly, and the filming crew was in tears by the end of the conversation. Though there were meetings in which Buck suggested it was "not a good day for cameras", the camera crew only left the room once during the year, in a meeting following the film's first screening to a family audience. Peter Del Vecho later said that the crew of Frozen 2 wanted to "show the world" the size of the crew and "the hard work it takes to put these films together", though he found it a "tough process" to have the documentary crew filming for a year. Josh Gad experienced self-consciousness, as Olaf's dialogue and singing were developed with "experiment and play". Lee found it enjoyable to show the crew how animation worked; she said of the "very intense" story room that it was harder to be filmed, but that the crew "were very patient with us".

The documentary features the song "See the Sky", which was cut from the final film but not released in the soundtrack. Harding's favorite scene which was cut from the series was Giaimo discussing what he viewed as the crew's "passion, dedication, and specific OCD-like tendencies" while trimming his hedges to resemble the shape of trees in Frozen. The documentary omits any mention of John Lasseter, the studio's chief creative officer before Lee who left the role after reports of him perpetrating sexual misconduct against employees in his position at Disney. It also does not cover the production's consultations with the Sámi people over their representation in the film, which largely occurred prior to the final year of production.

== Episodes ==
| No. in season | Title | Directed by | Original release date | Length (minutes) |
|---|---|---|---|---|
| 1 | "A Year to Premiere" | Megan Harding | June 26, 2020 | 44 minutes |
At a three-monthly screening held to showcase the current work on Frozen 2, the early animation, storyboards, and initial song drafts are played to professional filmmakers. Their feedback in a following panel informs the direction of the story. Currently, the songwriters Kristen Anderson-Lopez and Robert "Bobby" Lopez are working on "Some Things Never Change". The cast comes in to record their parts for the song: Idina Menzel as Elsa, Kristen Bell as Anna, Josh Gad as Olaf, and Jonathan Groff as Kristoff. Wayne Unten is an animation supervisor and Malerie Walters is an animator. A group of 90 character animators are directed by supervisors for each character, who ensure a consistent style throughout the film. At dailies, Walters shows her work to the directors Jennifer Lee and Chris Buck. She is animating a scene at the end of "Into the Unknown" in which Elsa runs and leaps. Most of the vocals for "Into the Unknown" have been recorded. A 90-piece orchestra records the full score. Meanwhile, the Lopezes are working on a storyboard of "Show Yourself" and discussing whether it fits with Elsa's personality and motivations with other staff.
| 2 | "Back to the Drawing Board" | Megan Harding | June 26, 2020 | 42 minutes |
In February 2019, nine months before release, about 20% of the movie has been animated. The first trailer is about to be released. Meanwhile, Groff is recording the parts of Kristoff and Sven in the rock ballad "Lost in the Woods". He was originally to sing a song about Kristoff proposing to Anna, "Get This Right", but his storyline was adapted so that he would propose at the end of the film rather than the beginning. Production designer Michael Giaimo discusses the narrative of "Show Yourself" with Lee. Lee has been working long hours in a routine that involves her waking up at 4:45 a.m. on weekdays and working from 5 a.m. to 1 p.m. on weekends. She converses with Walters, who is working on a segment of "Lost in the Woods" where reindeer run and sing. Meanwhile, the character technical director Iker de Los Mozos has been creating "rigging"—barebones animation—for reindeer, working on their facial expressions as they sing. "Show Yourself" has been rewritten to build up more gradually, but Bobby, Kristen, and Jennifer discuss whether the song should be kept or replaced altogether.
| 3 | "Journey to Ahtohallan" | Megan Harding | June 26, 2020 | 39 minutes |
The next screening introduces "See the Sky", where the Northuldra tribe and Arendelle soldier Mattias first appear. Producer Peter Del Vecho found that it was not received by the audience as hoped, so it is cut. However, "Show Yourself" is kept with some reworkings. The crew discusses who the voice calling Elsa is, settling on Elsa's mother, Queen Iduna. Sterling K. Brown comes in to record dialogue for Mattias, the first character of African descent in the Frozen franchise. Evan Rachel Wood records for Queen Iduna in "Show Yourself". Giaimo explains the design of the glacier Ahtohallan. It was informed by the crew's research trip to Norway, Finland, and Iceland in 2016. Art director of environments David Womersley and his team are building it around Elsa's movements in "Show Yourself". "The Next Right Thing" developed from a conversation between Bell and Lee about Bell's depression and anxiety. Lee relates to Anna based on her experiences of being bullied. Hyun Min Lee, who is Anna's animation supervisor, works on animating her sadder emotions. Another inspiration for the song was Buck's loss of his 23-year-old son Ryder, to whom a character of the same name was dedicated.
| 4 | "Big Changes" | Megan Harding | June 26, 2020 | 38 minutes |
Five months before the premiere, the film is first shown to a family audience in San Diego. The animation is roughly half-finished. Feedback to Olaf and the salamander is very positive. Adults received the storyline positively, but the children found it hard to understand. Lee rewrites the script to be simpler and more humorous. A new scene shows Olaf explain the storyline of Frozen to characters in the Enchanted Forest. Shot coordinator Jonny Hylton collates a list of shots and scenes which will remain and which will need to be changed. Meanwhile, Gad records "When I Am Older", a song in which Olaf is nervous, in contrast to his Frozen song "In Summer". Improvisation has informed some of Gad's dialogue in both movies. Layout artist Juan Hernandez works on the virtual "cameras" for animated scenes, which determine the angles at which the scene is shown. Effects supervisor Erin Ramos works on the large body of water that approaches Arendelle near the end of the movie. The simulations are large-scale and can take days for the technology to compute.
| 5 | "Race to the Finish" | Megan Harding | June 26, 2020 | 32 minutes |
By June 2019, five months to the premiere, much of the crew are working longer hours, six days a week. The script is locked after a change to the movie's opening: to avoid confusing the audience, a young Anna and Elsa are shown earlier. A prologue involving an unknown narrator discussing the Northuldra tribe is replaced, Queen Iduna now singing "All Is Found" in a lullaby. Effects designer Dan Lund is working on Elsa's dress transformation in "Show Yourself", which must incorporate the snowflake motif. Simulations are run on the movement of Elsa's hair and clothing in the wind, involving tests with real-life fabric. The lighting department works on the brightness of the scene. In Burbank, California, singers are recording the joik "Forest Vuelie", an adaptation of the joik which opens Frozen. In Frozen 2, it is sung by the Northuldra people. Christophe Beck writes the instrumental score of the film. Exclusive scenes from the movie are shown at Disney's D23 Expo fan convention in Anaheim. Jennifer and Chris take photos and sign autographs before the animated "Into the Unknown" segment premieres, followed by the main cast's live onstage performance of "Some Things Never Change".
| 6 | "The World Awaits" | Megan Harding | June 26, 2020 | 29 minutes |
Three months prior to the premiere, in August 2019, the studio is being decorated with Frozen 2 art, including life-size character sculptures. Dave Metzger works on the 85-piece orchestral score for "Show Yourself", then supervises the recording of the score by a full orchestra. A month later is the final day of animation. Editor Jeff Draheim has been working 14-hour days, beginning at 4 a.m. After animation finishes, foley artists work on recording additional sounds to be synchronized with the animation. Sound designer Odin Benitez is working on rock sounds for the rock giants. At one month to premiere, Lee and Buck give the final sign-off to the sound mix. The wrap party is held at the Pasadena Convention Center five days to the premiere—it marks the first time most of the crew have seen the film from start to finish. In the following days, the main cast make television appearances to promote the film. The cast and crew arrive at the world premiere at the El Capitan Theatre, where fans are lining up to watch the movie. The film is exhibited around the world in 46 languages and becomes the hіghest-grossing anіmated fіlm of all tіme—according to Disney, which does not consider the 2019 remake of The Lion King to be an animated film.

== Release ==
External videos
- "Into the Unknown: Making Frozen 2"; The series' trailer

In April 2019, it was announced that a companion documentary series would be launched on the Disney+ streaming service within its first year entitled Into the Unknown: Making Frozen 2. Frozen 2 was released in November 2019. The documentary's first trailer premiered in June 2020 and the series was released on June 26, 2020. Radio Times held a live discussion with Buck, Unten, and Walters at 5 p.m. BST on the day of its release. At the 2020 Annecy International Animation Film Festival, which was held online, the first episode of the documentary was made available from June 26 to June 28. Frozen 2 was added to Disney+ shortly afterward, on July 3.

== Reception ==
Joel Keller of Decider reviewed the documentary positively, saying that it "doesn't suffer from the usual Disney self-promotional schtick" and was "a very informative series that shows that even the best animated features run into issues." Ethan Anderton of /Film reviewed it as "informative and fascinating". Anderton praised it for featuring "touching and crushingly honest moments" such as Bell's relation to "The Next Right Thing", and covering the "frustration" involved in adapting "Show Yourself." Nick Romano of Entertainment Weekly recommended it for demonstrating that "there's as much heart behind these films as there are on screen."

Ed Potton of The Times rated the documentary 4 stars out of 5 stars, who said that "such honesty is still rare in Hollywood" and that the challenges faced by the staff make the "cheesy payoffs hit home." Drew Taylor of Collider rated the documentary an "A," calling it "thoroughly riveting and surprisingly honest." Taylor compared it favorably to Disney's previous behind-the-scenes releases for "showing the filmmakers at their most vulnerable, both personally and artistically." Melissa Camacho of Common Sense Media rated the series 3 out of 5 stars and found it to be a "heartfelt behind-the-scene" documentary that highlights the different stages of an animated film production.
