= Cantus (Norwegian female choir) =

Norwegian women's choir

Cantus is a Norwegian women's choir founded in 1986. It consists of around 30 amateur singers, and is based in Trondheim. Their director is Tove Ramlo-Ystad.

Despite being an amateur choir, they keep holding a very good international standard, and have shown this through winning several competitions through the years.

Cantus won the 1st Xinghai Prize International Choir Championships in Guangzhou, China (2012), and is ranked as number 1 in their class, and 8th best in the world, on the webpages of interkultur.com.

In 2013, Cantus appeared on the soundtrack of the Disney animated movie Frozen, with a Sámi inspired piece written by Frode Fjellheim and movie composer Christophe Beck. In 2019, Cantus appeared again on the soundtrack of Frozen II.

== Awards ==
- 1990 – First and Third place in the national choir competition "Syng med oss" in Bergen, Norway
- 1993 – First place, Llangollen Musical Eisteddfod in Wales in the category "female choir" and selected "choir of the world"
- 1994 – First place in Schubertiade, Vienna Austria in the category "female choir", Second place overall
- 1995 – First place at the Sligo Choral Festival in Ireland in the category "female choir"
- 1995 – Received Trondheim Municipality's Cultural Award
- 1996 – First place at the Concorso Corale Internazionale Riva del Garda, Italy, in the category "female choir", and Third place in "sacred music". Winner of the Audience Award and the Conductor Award.
- 1996 – Received Sør-Trøndelag County's Cultural Award
- 1997 – Third place at the Tolosa International Choir Competition, Spain in both "equal voices" and "folk music"
- 1998 – First place at the Béla Bartók International Choir Competition in Debrecen, Hungary. Winner of the best interpretation of a work by Béla Bartók ("Isten Veled")
- 1999 – First place at the Cantate Maasmechelen in Belgium, in the category "equal voices". Winner of "best compulsory piece"
- 2000 – First place at the 8th Athens International Choir Festival, Greece, in the categories "equal voices" and "folklore"
- 2002 – First place at the 48th Cork International Choral Festival, Ireland. Winner of the Fleischmann International Trophy
- 2003 – First place at the Florilege Vocal Tours, France. Winner of "best new choral work" (“Lament of the Reed” by Jaakko Mäntyjärvi)
- 2006 – Second place at the 4th World Choir Games, Xiamen, China, in the category "female choir", and 8th place in the category "Contemporary music"
- 2007 – First place at the 11th International Choir Competition Budapest, Hungary, in categories "female choir" and "folklore"
- 2008 – Second place in the category "female choir" and 5th place in "folklore" at the 5th World Choir Games in Graz, Austria
- 2009 – First place in the Norwegian championship for choirs in Trondheim, with the highest score of all choirs
- 2011 – First place in the 7th International Warsaw Choir Festival, Poland, in the category "equal adult voices"
- 2012 – First place in the First Xinghai Prize International Choir Championships, in the category "female choir"
- 2013 – First place in the category "female choir" and Third place in the category "sacred music" in the Al Mar International choral festival, Calella/Barcelona, Spain
- 2018 – First place in the category "Female Chamber Choir" and Tenth place in the category "Musica contemporanea" in the 10th World Choir Games Tshwane 2018

== Discography ==
- Cantus (1994)
- Hei, for en vakker julsong (1996)
- Ledig (2001)
- Far (2005)
- Rætt hjæm (2007)
- Norwegian Voices (2011)
- Spes (2015)
- Northern Lights (2017)
- Fryd (2019)
- Yggdrasil (2023)
