= All Is Found =

2019 song by Evan Rachel Wood

Song by Evan Rachel Wood

from the album Frozen II
- Published: Wonderland Music Company
- Length: 2:05
- Label: Walt Disney
- Songwriters: Kristen Anderson-Lopez; Robert Lopez

Music video (sing-along)
- "All is Found" on YouTube

"All Is Found" is a song from the 2019 Disney film Frozen 2. The song is performed by Evan Rachel Wood as Queen Iduna, the mother of Elsa and Anna, and written by Kristen Anderson-Lopez and Robert Lopez.

== Production ==
The song was the first to be composed for the film, and its composers sought inspiration from "Rock-a-bye Baby" and Norwegian lullabies. It was written before Wood was cast.

== International versions ==
As happened in Moana with a Tahitian, Māori and Hawaiian version, a special Sami dubbing was made specifically for the movie, given the inspiration it took from Sami culture, with the song "All is Found" being performed by Norwegian singer Eva Jeanette Iversen with the title "Gávnnat Buot". Norwegian-Swedish composer Christine Hals, who had previously taken part in the composition of the soundtrack for the movie Frozen, writing the lyrics in Old Norse for the song "Heimr Árnadalr" and performing kulning for Beck to use it in his score, returned in the sequel to voice Queen Iduna in the Norwegian dubbing, singing the Norwegian version of the song with the title "I Elven Finnes Alt/In The River There Is Everything".

== End credits version by Kacey Musgraves ==
"All Is Found" (Kacey Musgraves version)

Song by Kacey Musgraves

from the album Frozen II
- Published: Wonderland Music Company
- Length: 3:02
- Label: Walt Disney
- Songwriters: Kristen Anderson-Lopez; Robert Lopez
- Producers: Kacey Musgraves; Daniel Tashian; Ian Fitchuk

The film features a version of the song played over the end credits, performed by American country singer Kacey Musgraves. Musgraves recorded her version of the song in Nashville, Tennessee. The song was released on November 15, 2019, as part of the Frozen 2 soundtrack. In most dubbings of the film, Musgraves' version is played during the end credits.

Musgraves' rendition of the song offers a more stripped-down and folk-inspired interpretation compared to the original, which is sung by Evan Rachel Wood as Queen Iduna. Adding to the enchanting arrangement, Grammy Award winning mandolinist and singer-songwriter Chris Thile, accompanies Musgraves' version with his masterful mandolin playing and harmonizing vocals.

== International end credits version ==
There are six versions of the song in other languages. The Tamil and Telugu versions were performed by Indian singer Sunitha Sarathy, who also lent her voice for the character Iduna in the same languages. In the Hindi version, actress Smita Malhotra performed the end credits version of the song and provided the voice for the character Iduna as well.

"All is Found" (end credits version) worldwide
Language	Performer	Title	Translation
English	Kacey Musgraves	"All is found"	
Hindi	स्मिता मल्होत्रा (Smita Malhotra)	"यादों की नदिया" ("Yaadon ki nadiya")	"The river of memories"
Kazakh	Индира Едильбаева (Indira Edibayeva)	"Берін табасйн" ("Berin tabasyn")	Unknown
Mandarin Chinese (China)	吉娜·爱丽丝 (Gina Alice Redlinger)	"回忆之河" ("Huí yì zhī hé")	"The river of memories"
Russian	Наталья Павлова (Natalia Pavlova) & Павел Алоин (Pavel Aloin)	"Баллада о реке Ахтохаллэн" ("Ballada o reke Akhtokhallan")	"Ballad of Ahtohallan river"
Tamil	Sunitha Sarathy	"வாடை சேரும் பேராழி" ("Vaadai serum peraazhi")	"The north wind meets the ocean"
Telugu	Sunitha Sarathy	"హంస దీవి తీరాన" ("Hamsa dheevi teeraana")	"On the seashore"

== Charts ==
=== Evan Rachel Wood version ===
Chart (2019)	Peak position
Singapore (RIAS)	27
US Bubbling Under Hot 100 (Billboard)	5
US Digital Song Sales (Billboard)	49
US Kid Digital Songs (Billboard)	5

=== Kacey Musgraves version ===
Chart (2019)	Peak position
US Hot Country Songs (Billboard)	31
US Kid Digital Songs (Billboard)	6

== Certifications ==
Region	Certification	Certified units/sales
New Zealand (RMNZ)	Platinum	30,000^{‡}
United Kingdom (BPI)	Gold	400,000^{‡}
United States (RIAA)	2× Platinum	2,000,000^{‡}
^{‡} Sales+streaming figures based on certification alone.

== Reception ==
The Los Angeles Times deemed it the fourth best song from the film. Vox called the song a "beautiful refrain".
