= Show Yourself (Disney song) =

Song by Idina Menzel and Evan Rachel Wood

from the album Frozen 2
- Published: Wonderland Music Company
- Length: 4:20
- Label: Walt Disney
- Songwriters: Kristen Anderson-Lopez; Robert Lopez

Music video (film sequence)
- "Show Yourself" on YouTube

"Show Yourself" is a song from the 2019 Disney film Frozen 2. It is performed by Idina Menzel and Evan Rachel Wood, and written by Kristen Anderson-Lopez and Robert Lopez.

== Background ==
A sample of Show Yourself, you can hear Elsa call for the voice and it responding.

Elsa follows a mysterious voice across the Dark Sea to Ahtohallan. She explores memories of the past, discovering the secrets of what occurred in the Enchanted Forest and the source of her powers. She sings "Show Yourself" as she dives deeper toward the truth.

The original version of the song was approximately six-and-a-half minutes long.

"It had to be really triumphant and the process took us about six months to do because all the rest of the story was still locking. We just had to keep rewriting the last three minutes of the song so much [assisted by story artist Mark Smith]. But now I really love the moment when she [tames] Nokk, the water horse, and you feel this joyful settling in Elsa."

— Kristen Anderson-Lopez

Lopez gave a similar account: "When we saw the first round of visuals and then we saw it in the film, everyone agreed changes needed to happen. And it went back and forth for months—it's now four minutes and 20 seconds and it has a big ending. It transformed a lot, and it was hard."

== Reception ==
Show Yourself received acclaim from critics and fans. USA Today wrote "it's a joy to listen to [Menzel] nail every note in sight". Stuff praised it for incorporating the film's other musical motifs. The New York Times compared its theme of self-acceptance with "Let It Go" from Frozen. Like "Let It Go", the track has also been interpreted as a coming out for the LGBTQ community.

== Chart performance ==
The song debuted at number 99 on the Billboard Hot 100 before rising to 70 in its second week.

== Charts ==
| Chart (2019) | Peak position |
|---|---|
| Canada (Canadian Hot 100) | 73 |
| Ireland (IRMA) | 84 |
| Malaysia (RIM) | 19 |
| Singapore (RIAS) | 19 |
| South Korea (Gaon) | 14 |
| UK Singles (Official Charts) | 62 |
| US Billboard Hot 100 | 70 |
| US Kid Digital Songs Sales (Billboard) | 2 |
| US Rolling Stone Top 100 | 66 |

== Certifications ==
| Region | Certification | Certified units/sales |
|---|---|---|
| Australia (ARIA) | Platinum | 70,000^{‡} |
| Canada (Music Canada) | Gold | 40,000^{‡} |
| New Zealand (RMNZ) | Platinum | 30,000^{‡} |
| United Kingdom (BPI) | Platinum | 600,000^{‡} |
| United States (RIAA) | 3× Platinum | 3,000,000^{‡} |
^{‡} Sales+streaming figures based on certification alone.
