= The Next Right Thing =

2019 song by Kristen Bell

Song by Kristen Bell

from the album Frozen II
- Published: Wonderland Music Company
- Released: November 18, 2019
- Length: 3:36
- Label: Walt Disney Records
- Songwriters: Kristen Anderson-Lopez; Robert Lopez

Lyric video
- "The Next Right Thing" on YouTube

"The Next Right Thing" is a song from the 2019 animated Disney film Frozen 2. It is performed by American actress and singer Kristen Bell in her vocal role as Princess Anna, and the music and lyrics are written by Kristen Anderson-Lopez and Robert Lopez. The song portrays Anna's journey through depression. The song has received praise from critics for its message and meaning and peaked on the Kid Digital Songs chart at number 7.

== Synopsis ==
At the darkest moment of the film, Anna is faced with uncertainty about what to do next after apparently losing both her beloved sister Elsa as well as Olaf, a snowman created by Elsa's magic. In her song "The Next Right Thing," she expresses her feelings of depression. As the song progresses, she reaches the realization that when faced with uncertainty, one must simply focus on doing "The Next Right Thing."

== Production ==
Bell told director Jennifer Lee she wanted to see Anna "face her codependency head-on" and "a song about what she's going to do when she doesn't know what to do". Anderson-Lopez and Lopez drew inspiration from personal tragedy in the lives of two people that worked on Frozen and Frozen II; co-director Chris Buck lost a son, and Andrew Page, a central figure in the music production of both films, lost a daughter. Buck's son died around the time when Buck needed to begin the interviews and press tours to promote Frozen; the Lopezes witnessed how Buck insisted on going through that highly public process and the subsequent awards season even though he was dealing with such a terrible personal tragedy at the same time. Anderson-Lopez stated when writing the lyrics, she "really just thought about them, and wrote it for them." Bell said she drew inspiration from her own mental health.

A lot of people feel that feeling: What do I do when I don't know what to do? My personal mantra is you just do the next right thing. It also stems from when I am experiencing anxiety and depression. What do I do when I don't want to get out of bed in the morning? You just do the next right thing, and that's stepping out of bed. The next right thing is brushing your teeth. The next right thing is eating your breakfast. The next right thing is looking at your calendar and going to work. This idea of having an intrinsic motivation versus extrinsic motivation is something that as a parent I know is incredibly important to show kids and to help them cope. I really wanted Anna to be representative of that.

== International versions ==
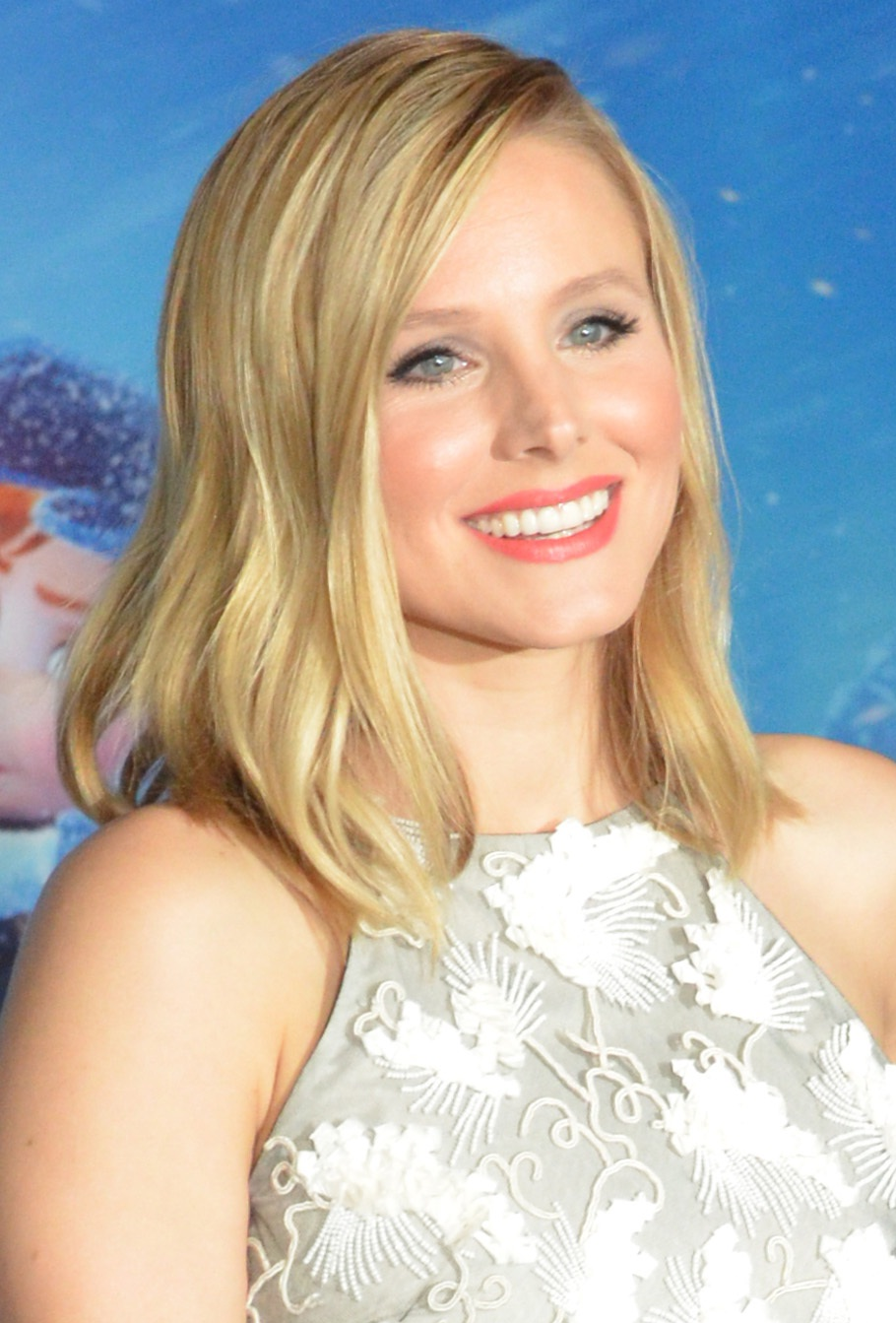
In the English version, Kristen Bell sings "The Next Right Thing"

As it happened in Moana with a Tahitian, Māori and Hawaiian version, the Sami version was an exceptional dubbing made specifically for the movie, given the inspiration it took from Sami culture.

== ASL version ==
An American Sign Language version of the song premiered on April 27, 2026, on Disney+ as part of Walt Disney Animation Studios Songs in Sign Language, made in collaboration with DJ Kurs and Deaf West Theatre, with Kurs and actress Deanne Bray providing ASL choreography and Brey providing the ASL animation reference for Anna.

"The Next Right Thing" worldwide
Language	Performer	Title	Translation
Croatian	Sementa Rajhard	"Put svoj nać"	"Find your way"
Czech	Tereza Martinková	"Dalši správná vec"	"Another right thing"
Danish	Kristine Yde Eriksen	"Tag ét skridt frem"	"Take a step forward"
Dutch	Noortje Herlaar	"Doe wat het beste is"	"Do what is best"
English	Kristen Bell	"The next right thing"	
Finnish	Saara Aalto	"Kuin oikein on"	"What's right"
Flemish	Aline Goffin	"Wat het beste is"	"What is best"
French (Europe)	Emmylou Homs	"Tout réparer"	"To make it all right"
German	Pia Allgaier	"Der nächste Schritt"	"The next step"
Hindi	शार्वी यादव (Sharvi Yadav)	"सही एक क़दम" ("Sahi ek qadam")	"The right step"
Italian	Serena Rossi	"Fai ciò che è giusto"	"Do what is right"
Japanese	神田沙也加 (Kanda Sayaka)	"わたしにできること" ("Watashi ni dekiru koto")	"What's left for me to do"
Kazakh	Назерке Серікболова (Nazerke Serikbolova)	"Берін зһенемін" ("Berin zhenemin")	Unknown
Korean	박지윤 (Park Ji-Yoon)	"해야 할 일" ("Haeya hal il")	"What has to be done"
Mandarin Chinese (China)	李潇潇 (Xiao Xiao Li)	"下一件事" ("Xià yī jiàn shì")	"The next thing"
Norwegian	May Kristin Kaspersen	"Neste rette ting"	"The next right thing"
Polish	Magdalena Wasylik	"Już ty wiesz co"	"You know what"
Portuguese (Brazil)	Gabriela Porto	"Fazer o que é melhor"	"To do what is best"
Portuguese (Europe)	Cátia Moreira	"O que está certo"	"What's right"
Russian	Наталия Быстрова (Natalia Bystrova)	"Делай, что должна" ("Delay chto dolzhna")	"Do what you have to do"
Sami	Elin Kristina Oskal	"Daga de riekta fal"	"Do the right thing"
Slovak	Lucia Molnárová Bugalová	"Čas na správnu vec"	”Time for the right thing”
Spanish (Europe)	Carmen López Pascual	"Hacer las cosas bien"	"To do things well"
Spanish (Latin America)	Romina Marroquín Payró	"Lo que hay que hacer"	"What has to be done"
Swedish	Mimmi Sandén	"Ett litet kliv"	"A small step"
Tamil	Alisha Thomas	"செய்வேன் சரியானதை" ("Seiven sariyaanadhai")	"I will do the right thing"
Telugu	Alisha Thomas	"సరి చేస్తా" ("Sari chesthaa")	"It's alright"
Thai	หนึ่งธิดา โสภณ (Neungthida Sopon)	"สิ่งที่ควร" ("Sing thi khuan")	"Things should do"
Turkish	Deniz Sujana	"Doğru Şey Uğruna"	"For the right thing"
Vietnamese	Võ Hạ Trâm	"Tự mình vượt qua"	"To overcome it by myself"

== Reception ==
Multiple critics have praised "The Next Right Thing" for its meaning and message. MEAWW argues the song provides "one of the movie's most inspiring messages about dealing with pressure". The Los Angeles Times deemed it the best song of Frozen II. Hypable stated that the song was the "most valuable thing Frozen 2 has to offer". Jonathan Groff, who voices Kristoff in the film, said hearing the song "brought [him] to tears".

== Charts ==
Chart (2019)	Peak position
US Kid Digital Songs (Billboard)	7

== Certifications ==
Region	Certification	Certified units/sales
United Kingdom (BPI)	Silver	200,000^{‡}
United States (RIAA)	Gold	500,000^{‡}
^{‡} Sales+streaming figures based on certification alone.
