= Frozen 2 (soundtrack) =

Frozen 2 (Original Motion Picture Soundtrack)

Soundtrack album by various artists
- Released: November 15, 2019
- Recorded: 2019
- Studios: Air Studios; Big Bad Sound; Black Rainbow; Capitol; Downtown Music; NRG Recording; Pie; Power Station; Southern Ground, Studio D; Sunset Sound Recorders; Warner Bros. Eastwood Scoring Stage
- Genres: Pop; musical theatre
- Length: 31:18
- Label: Walt Disney
- Producers: Kristen Anderson-Lopez; Robert Lopez; David Metzger; Christophe Beck

Singles from Frozen 2 (Original Motion Picture Soundtrack)
- 1. "Into the Unknown (Idina Menzel and Aurora version)" Released: November 4, 2019; 2. "Into the Unknown (Panic! At The Disco version)" Released: November 4, 2019

Frozen 2 (Original Motion Picture Soundtrack) is the soundtrack album to the Disney's 2019 animated film of the same name. It was mainly composed by Kristen Anderson-Lopez and Robert Lopez, in addition to the end credits covers of three of the songs by Panic! at the Disco, Kacey Musgraves, and Weezer. The album was released on November 15, 2019, on digital, CD and vinyl formats, and it consisted of seven songs along with a remix of "Reindeer(s) Are Better Than People" from the original Frozen. The deluxe edition features a second disc of score tracks by composer Christophe Beck, cut songs, and instrumentals to the seven songs in the film.

In December 2019, it reached number one on the US Billboard 200, making it the first soundtrack of an animated film to hit the position since its predecessor. The single "Into the Unknown" was nominated for the Golden Globe Award for Best Original Song, the Academy Award for Best Original Song, and the Critics' Choice Movie Award for Best Song, but losing all three to "(I'm Gonna) Love Me Again" from Rocketman.

== Background ==
In March 2018, Kristen Anderson-Lopez revealed in an interview that she and her husband, Robert Lopez, would return from the film Frozen to write songs for its sequel Frozen 2, having been already recorded a song for the project with the help of star Kristen Bell. Later in the D23 Expo presentation of that same year, Disney revealed that the soundtrack would incorporate a total of seven songs.

Marketing details on the complete tracklist were unveiled on September 30, 2019, which would be released on the following November 15 distributed by Walt Disney Records.

Co-director and screenwriter Jennifer Lee said that "the songs and score of Frozen 2 reflect both the growth of the characters and the deepening of their story", she described the songs as "emotional, personal yet powerful, intimate but also epic". Another co-director Chris Buck emphasized the importance of the musical team, the Lopezes, and Christophe Beck. Additionally, he noted the impact of the vibrant and emotional musics, and said it helps deepen and expand the reach of the story. The song "Into the Unknown", sung by Idina Menzel as Elsa with additional vocals by Norwegian recording artist Aurora, has been called the successor of Frozen's "Let It Go".

Anderson-Lopez stated their achievements come from brainstorming on big questions — "what is the story that we all as artists, individually and collectively, need to tell? She also disclosed their production strategy of using sensitive emotional feelings and connections to the story. Lopez also said that "[his and Anderson-Lopez's] tradition of songwriting come from inspirations of the world of musical theater, where songs must always forward the story freshly and surprisingly. Every song has to take a character on a journey".

Lopez further explained that the songs are thematically connected to the idea of change, and the idea of the journey. According to Anderson-Lopez, the theme of a journey was a very "meta-story" for them, because it was not always clear along the way how all the songs would fit together in the final version of the film. They kept telling themselves that things would be eventually clearer in six months, and by the time the movie proceeds. According to Anderson-Lopez, the theme of a journey was a very "meta-story" for them, because it was not always clear along the way how all the songs would fit together in the final version of the film.

In November 2019, Panic! at the Disco's version of "Into the Unknown" was released as a single. Later in that same month, the Korean versions of "Into the Unknown" were also released, which would be performed by K-pop star and Girls' Generation member Taeyeon.

Composer Christophe Beck, who previously scored the first film, returned for the sequel, his score draws elements from Lopez and Anderson-Lopez's songs. As with the first film, Beck used Norwegian elements for the sequel's score, as well as featuring the Norwegian female choir Cantus, with Beck stating that it gives the score a "magical" setting, yet still being "rooted in real tradition". Beck said that the film's score reflects the character's growth since the original film, stating that "[s]imilar to how Elsa and Anna have grown up since the last film, the new score has also matured and introduces more sophisticated musical concepts and thematic elements". Beck also said that he wanted the sequel's score to reflect the film's "complex and intense" emotional story while commenting that he enjoyed "exploring extreme dynamic contrasts, harmonic complexity, intricate textures with vibrant colors, and hugely expressive melodic moments".

== Track listing ==
All songs are written by Robert Lopez and Kristen Anderson-Lopez with scores composed by Christophe Beck.

Standard edition
No.	Title	Performer(s)	Length
1.	"All Is Found"	Evan Rachel Wood	2:05
2.	"Some Things Never Change"	Kristen Bell; Idina Menzel; Josh Gad; Jonathan Groff; Cast of Frozen 2	3:29
3.	"Into the Unknown"	Idina Menzel; Aurora	3:14
4.	"When I Am Older"	Josh Gad	1:51
5.	"Reindeer(s) Are Better Than People" (Continued)	Jonathan Groff	0:26
6.	"Lost in the Woods"	Jonathan Groff	3:00
7.	"Show Yourself"	Idina Menzel; Evan Rachel Wood	4:20
8.	"The Next Right Thing"	Kristen Bell	3:36
9.	"Into the Unknown" (Panic! at the Disco version)	Panic! at the Disco	3:09
10.	"All Is Found" (Kacey Musgraves version)	Kacey Musgraves	3:03
11.	"Lost in the Woods" (Weezer version)	Weezer	3:05
Total length:			31:18

Deluxe edition (disc 1)
No.	Title	Performer(s)	Length
12.	"All Is Found" (Lullaby ending) (Outtake)	Evan Rachel Wood	1:54
13.	"Home" (Outtake)	Kristen Bell	2:56
14.	"I Seek the Truth" (Outtake)	Kristen Anderson-Lopez; Patti Murin	4:01
15.	"Unmeltable Me" (Outtake)	Josh Gad	1:25
16.	"Get This Right" (Outtake)	Kristen Bell; Jonathan Groff	3:46
17.	"All Is Found" (Instrumental)	Kristen Anderson-Lopez; Robert Lopez	2:07
18.	"Some Things Never Change" (Instrumental)	Kristen Anderson-Lopez; Robert Lopez	3:27
19.	"Into the Unknown" (Instrumental)	Kristen Anderson-Lopez; Robert Lopez	3:16
20.	"When I Am Older" (Instrumental)	Kristen Anderson-Lopez; Robert Lopez	1:52
21.	"Reindeer(s) Are Better Than People" (Continued) (Instrumental)	Kristen Anderson-Lopez; Robert Lopez	0:14
22.	"Lost in the Woods" (Instrumental)	Kristen Anderson-Lopez; Robert Lopez	3:01
23.	"Show Yourself" (Instrumental)	Kristen Anderson-Lopez; Robert Lopez	4:18
24.	"The Next Right Thing" (Instrumental)	Kristen Anderson-Lopez; Robert Lopez	3:36
25.	"Into the Unknown" (Panic! at the Disco version) (Instrumental)	Kristen Anderson-Lopez; Robert Lopez	3:08
26.	"All Is Found" (Kacey Musgraves version) (Instrumental)	Kristen Anderson-Lopez; Robert Lopez	3:01
27.	"Lost in the Woods" (Weezer version) (Instrumental)	Kristen Anderson-Lopez; Robert Lopez	3:02
Total length:			77:40

Deluxe edition (disc 2)
No.	Title	Performer(s)	Length
1.	"Introduction"	Christophe Beck	0:59
2.	"The Northuldra"	Christophe Beck	2:35
3.	"Sisters"	Christophe Beck	1:05
4.	"Exodus"	Christophe Beck	1:21
5.	"The Mist"	Christophe Beck	2:42
6.	"Wind"	Christophe Beck	3:06
7.	"Iduna's Scarf"	Christophe Beck; Cast of Frozen 2	4:37
8.	"Fire and Ice"	Christophe Beck	3:16
9.	"Earth Giants"	Christophe Beck	1:57
10.	"The Ship"	Christophe Beck	4:55
11.	"River Slide"	Christophe Beck	2:32
12.	"Dark Sea"	Christophe Beck	2:47
13.	"Ghosts of Arendelle Past"	Christophe Beck	2:58
14.	"Gone Too Far"	Christophe Beck	3:43
15.	"Rude Awakening"	Christophe Beck	2:05
16.	"The Flood"	Christophe Beck	3:34
17.	"Reindeer Circle"	Cantus	1:40
18.	"Reunion"	Christophe Beck	3:50
19.	"Epilogue"	Christophe Beck	3:25
Total length:			53:09

== Charts ==
=== Weekly charts ===
Chart (2019–2020)	Peak position
Australian Albums (ARIA)	2
Austrian Albums (Ö3 Austria Top 40)	1
Belgian Albums (Ultratop)	15
Belgian Albums (Ultratop)	30
Canadian Albums (Billboard)	4
Danish Albums (Hitlisten)	16
Dutch Albums (Album Top 100)	14
Finnish Albums (Suomen virallinen lista)	46
French Albums (SNEP)	27
German Albums (Offizielle Top 100)	3
Italian Compilation Albums (FIMI)	2
Japan Hot Albums (Billboard)	6
Japanese Albums (Oricon)	6
New Zealand Albums (RMNZ)	8
Norwegian Albums (VG-lista)	21
Polish Albums (ZPAV)	15
South Korean Albums (Gaon)	5
Spanish Albums (PROMUSICAE)	28
Swiss Albums (Schweizer Hitparade)	13
UK Compilation Albums (OCC)	1
US Billboard 200	1
US Kid Albums (Billboard)	1
US Top Soundtracks (Billboard)	1

=== Year-end charts ===
Chart (2019)	Position
Austrian Albums (Ö3 Austria Top 40)	41
French Albums (SNEP)	132
Chart (2020)	Position
Australian Albums (ARIA)	24
Austrian Albums (Ö3 Austria Top 40)	9
Belgian Albums (Ultratop Flanders)	36
Belgian Albums (Ultratop Wallonia)	73
Canadian Albums (Billboard)	17
Danish Albums (Hitlisten)	68
Dutch Albums (Dutch Album Top 100)	76
French Albums (SNEP)	84
German Albums (Offizielle Top 100)	22
New Zealand Albums (RMNZ)	38
Spanish Albums (PROMUSICAE)	99
Swiss Albums (Schweizer Hitparade)	69
US Billboard 200	13
US Top Soundtracks (Billboard)	1
Chart (2021)	Position
US Billboard 200	156
US Top Soundtracks (Billboard)	2
Chart (2022)	Position
US Top Soundtracks (Billboard)	9
Chart (2023)	Position
US Top Soundtracks (Billboard)	10
Chart (2024)	Position
US Top Soundtracks (Billboard)	11
Chart (2025)	Position
US Top Soundtracks (Billboard)	15

== Certifications ==
Region	Certification	Certified units/sales
Austria (IFPI Austria)	Platinum	15,000^{‡}
Canada (Music Canada)	2× Platinum	160,000^{‡}
Denmark (IFPI Danmark)	Platinum	20,000^{‡}
France (SNEP)	Gold	50,000^{‡}
Germany (BVMI)	Gold	100,000^{‡}
Italy (FIMI)	Gold	25,000^{‡}
Japan (RIAJ)	Gold	100,000^{^}
New Zealand (RMNZ)	Platinum	15,000^{‡}
Norway (IFPI Norway)	Gold	10,000^{‡}
Poland (ZPAV)	Gold	10,000^{‡}
Singapore (RIAS)	Gold	5,000^{*}
United Kingdom (BPI)	Platinum	300,000^{‡}
United States (RIAA)	2× Platinum	2,000,000^{‡}
^{*} Sales figures based on certification alone.^{^} Shipments figures based on certification alone.^{‡} Sales+streaming figures based on certification alone.

== See also ==
- List of Billboard 200 number-one albums of 2019
