= Elsa (Frozen) =

Fictional character from the Frozen franchise

- Frozen character
- Elsa as she appears in Frozen (2013).
- First appearance: Frozen (2013)
- Created by: Chris Buck; Jennifer Lee
- Voiced by: Idina Menzel (adult); Eva Bella (8-year-old); Spencer Ganus (12-year-old); Mattea Conforti (young); Danielle Bisutti (Dreamlight Valley and Speedstorm)
- Portrayed by: Caissie Levy (musical); Caroline Bowman (musical); Samantha Barks (musical); Sarah Geronimo (musical, Manila); Georgina Haig (Once Upon a Time)
- Inspired by: The Snow Queen by Hans Christian Andersen

In-universe information
- Titles: Protector of the Enchanted Forest; Queen of Arendelle; Princess of Arendelle
- Family: King Agnarr (father); Queen Iduna (mother); Anna (sister); Olaf (creation)
- Relatives: King Runeard (grandfather)
- Nationality: Kingdom of Arendelle
- Age: 8 to 24 years
- Birth date: Winter Solstice

Elsa is a fictional character who appears in Walt Disney Animation Studios' animated fantasy film Frozen (2013), and later media of the Frozen franchise, including its sequel Frozen 2 (2019). She is voiced mainly by Idina Menzel, with Eva Bella as a young child and Spencer Ganus as a teenager in Frozen. In Frozen II, young Elsa is voiced by Mattea Conforti (at the start of the film) and Eva Bella (archive audio).

Created by co-writers and directors Chris Buck and Jennifer Lee, Elsa is loosely based on the title character of "The Snow Queen", a Danish fairy tale by Hans Christian Andersen. In the Disney film adaptation, she is introduced as a princess in the fictional Scandinavian Kingdom of Arendelle, heiress to the throne and the older sister of Anna (Kristen Bell). Elsa has the magical ability to create and manipulate ice and snow. She inadvertently sends Arendelle into an eternal winter on the evening of her coronation. Throughout the film, she struggles first with controlling and concealing her abilities and then with liberating herself from her fears of unintentionally harming others, especially her younger sister.

The Snow Queen character, neutral but cold-hearted in the original fairytale and villain in numerous adaptations of the character, proved difficult to adapt to film due to her transparent depiction. Several film executives, including Walt Disney, attempted to build on the character, and a number of scheduled film adaptations were shelved when they could not work out the character. Buck and his co-director, Jennifer Lee, were ultimately able to solve the dilemma by depicting Elsa and Anna as sisters. As much as Anna's struggle is external, Elsa's is internal. This led to Elsa being gradually rewritten as a sympathetic, misunderstood character.

Elsa has received largely positive reception from reviewers, who praised her complex characterization and vulnerability. Menzel was also widely praised for her vocal performance of Elsa, especially that of her performance of the song "Let It Go".

== Development ==
=== Origins and concept ===
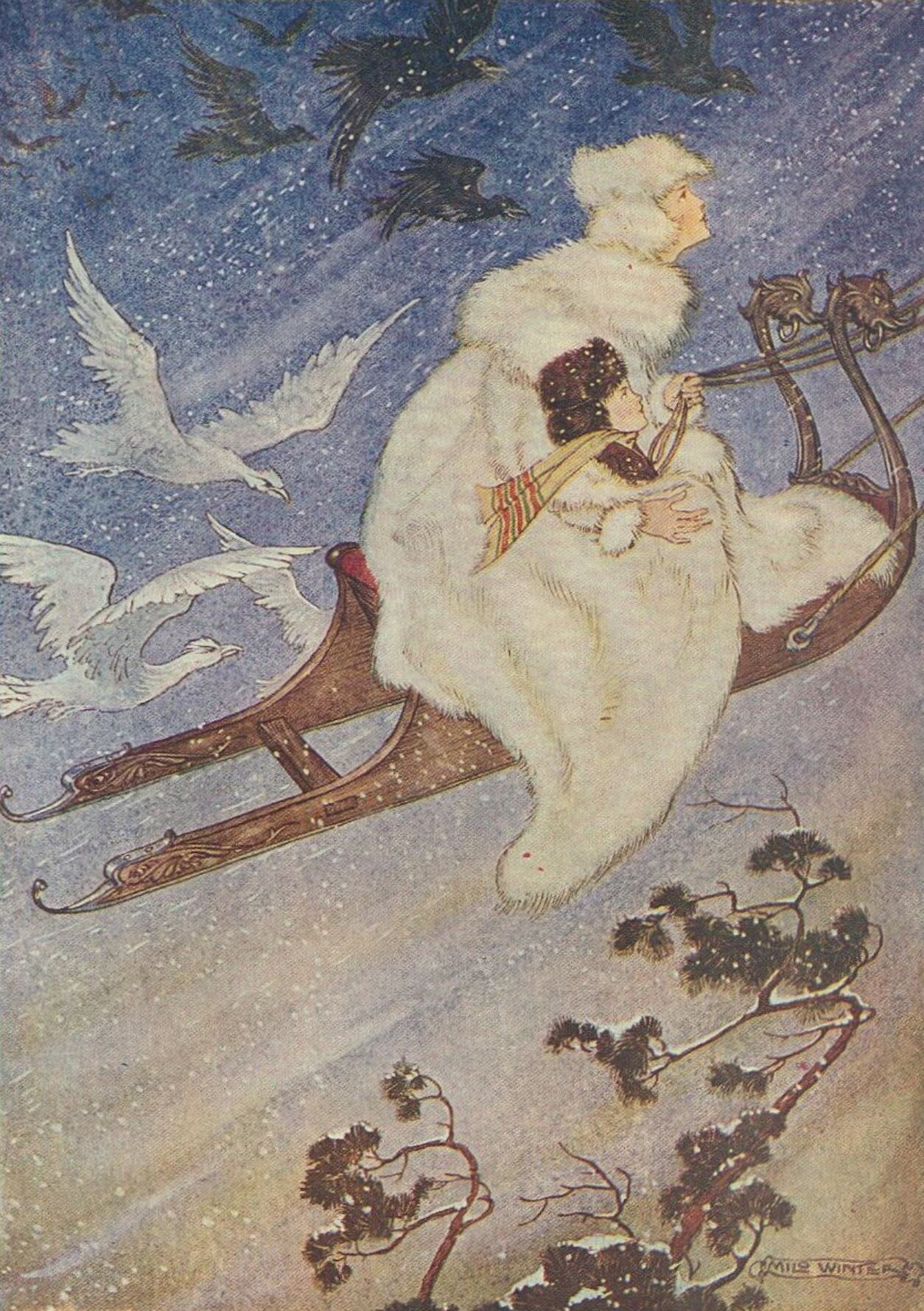
An illustration of the Snow Queen, the character Elsa is based upon.

Attempts were made as early as 1937 by Walt Disney to adapt Hans Christian Andersen's fairy tale, "The Snow Queen", into a film. The tale focuses on two children, one named Gerda, who served as the basis for Princess Anna, and the other named Kai, who is "cursed with negativity" after his eyes are pierced with shards of glass from an enchanted mirror and is later kidnapped by the Snow Queen. However, Disney struggled with creating a believable, multi-dimensional adaption of the fairy tale's title character, who was intended to be a villain. In the story, she is described as "a woman, dressed in garments of white gauze, which looked like millions of starry snow-flakes linked together. She was fair and beautiful, but made of ice—shining and glittering ice. Still she was alive and her eyes sparkled like bright stars, but there was neither peace nor rest in their glance." Disney was unable to find a way to make the Snow Queen more real and eventually abandoned film plans.

Several film executives later made efforts towards the project, including Paul and Gaëtan Brizzi, Dick Zondag, Glen Keane, and Dave Goetz. In 2011, director Chris Buck began work on another attempted adaption and also faced challenges with the Snow Queen character. Producer Peter Del Vecho explained that this was primarily because she was not relatable and too isolated, having no personal connections. As a result, they could not explain her motivations. After several changes were proposed, someone on the writing team suggested making the Snow Queen Anna's sister. "Once we realized that these characters could be siblings and have a relationship, everything changed," Del Vecho relayed.

The Snow Queen, now given the name Elsa, continued to be cast as a villain, and Disney released the following synopsis for Frozen in May 2013:

When Anna is cursed by her estranged sister, the cold-hearted Snow Queen, Anna's only hope of reversing the curse is to survive a perilous but thrilling journey across an icy and unforgiving landscape. Joined by a rugged, thrill-seeking outdoorsman, his one-antlered reindeer and a hapless snowman, Anna must race against time, conquer the elements and battle an army of menacing snowmen if she ever hopes to melt her frozen heart.

Earlier manuscripts included more antagonistic actions by Elsa, such as intentionally cursing Arendelle with an eternal winter. Additionally, she is shown creating an army of snowmen similar to the original Snow Queen's army of snowflakes; the comedic character of Olaf was at the time written as a smaller snowman who was cast out by Elsa for being too unintimidating. Within two months, however, scripts were altered to give emphasis to her lack of control over her powers. Olaf was reduced to the only snowman created by Elsa, and he instead serves as a reminder of the sisters' childhood friendship. In the final version, Elsa creates a single giant snow creature that Olaf nicknames "Marshmallow" to act as a guard after being branded as a monster for her powers. According to director Jennifer Lee, the character ultimately became more of a composite of both Kai and the Snow Queen, enhancing her increasingly sympathetic portrayal. Del Vecho added, "There are times when Elsa does villainous things but because you understand where it comes from, from this desire to defend herself, you can always relate to her."

=== Voice ===
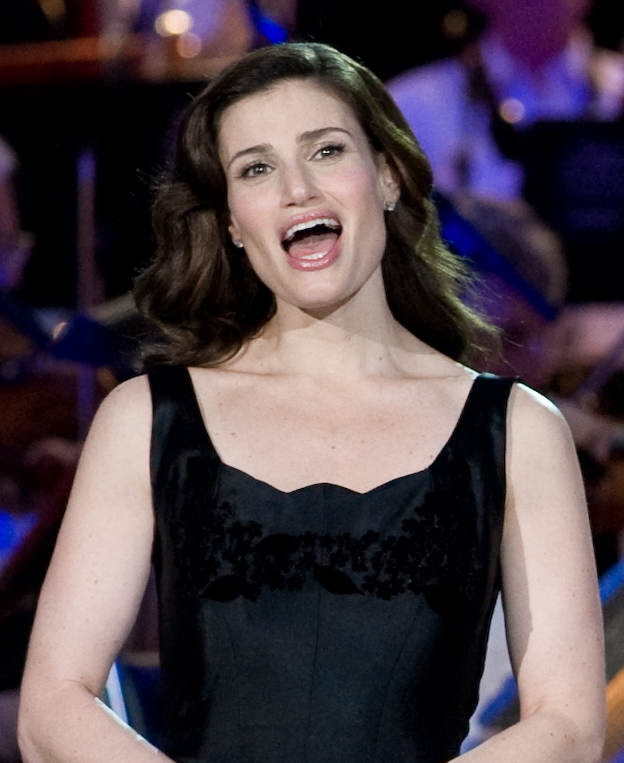
Idina Menzel provided both the singing and speaking voice of Elsa.

Eva Bella and Spencer Ganus were cast to portray Elsa as a young child and as a teenager, respectively. Actress and singer Megan Mullally was originally cast to voice an adult Elsa, but was replaced by Idina Menzel. Menzel already knew Kristen Bell, who voiced Anna, and had previously auditioned for a lead role in the 2010 Disney film Tangled. She was not cast for the part, but the casting director recorded her singing and later showed the recording to Frozen's film executives. Menzel was surprised when she was subsequently asked to audition, and she received the role after reading the script out loud. In interviews, she acknowledged similarities between Elsa, her then-current role, and Elphaba from Wicked, her previous role. Namely, she said, they were both very powerful and very misunderstood individuals.

Director Chris Buck believed that Menzel's vocals would help in the portrayal of the character, saying, "Idina has a sense of vulnerability in her voice. She plays a very strong character, but someone who lives in fear—so we needed someone who could portray both sides of the character, and Idina was just amazing." Menzel was unaccustomed to working with animated films and being required to portray her character's feelings with her voice alone, though she did not find it particularly challenging. While recording, she was able to "play" with her voice, trying various tones to establish the ranges in Elsa's emotions. For example, Menzel wanted there to be a difference between the ways she sounded when she was being bold and when she was angry. She would also physically restrict her hands from moving as she recorded the film's early scenes in order to project how her character was "so afraid to move and feel anything that it would come out and hurt people".

During production, Menzel and Jonathan Groff, who portrays Kristoff, went to the animation studio to explain to the animators how they were approaching their characters. Animators asked Menzel questions about her singing, observed how she breathed as she sang live, and made videorecordings of her recording sessions; they then animated Elsa's breathing to match Menzel's breathing, for further realism. Her voice supplied inspiration for Elsa's most prominent song, "Let It Go". According to composer Robert Lopez, Menzel's vocal range was able to clearly convey Elsa's "low, vulnerable, fragile side" as well as her power and self-realization. Menzel commented that it was "an honor" to have the song and that she enjoyed recording it. "It's a collision of a bunch of forces that are all coming together in the right way," she explained. "The character, what she is singing and what she is experiencing; beautiful lyrics, beautiful melody and a little bit of me." Buck and Lee were also surprised by how compatible Menzel and Kristen Bell's voices were. At one point during a table read, they sang a ballad (later revealed as "Wind Beneath My Wings") back and forth to one another with so much sentiment that it reportedly left everyone who was present with tears in their eyes. Subsequently, Lee wanted Menzel and Bell to be in the same room when they were recording the important emotional scenes of the film.

=== Design and characterization ===
Following the casting of Idina Menzel, Elsa's characterization underwent several alterations. According to Menzel, she was originally scripted as a one-dimensional antagonist but was gradually revised as a more vulnerable, multifaceted figure. Menzel further described her character as "extremely complicated and misunderstood". Director Jennifer Lee stated that Elsa is largely driven by fear throughout the film, while Menzel added that she was also struggling with her potential to be "a strong, powerful, extraordinary woman". Executive producer and animator John Lasseter became very "protective of Elsa" and was adamant about portraying her in a more favorable, sympathetic light. Writer and director Jennifer Lee stated on Twitter that Elsa's body language and mannerisms were "intentional to show anxiety and depression". In July 2013, Disney released images of the film's main characters along with outlines of their roles in the story. Elsa received the following description:

From the outside, Elsa looks poised, regal and reserved, but in reality, she lives in fear as she wrestles with a mighty secret—she was born with the power to create ice and snow. It's a beautiful ability, but also extremely dangerous. Haunted by the moment her magic nearly killed her younger sister Anna, Elsa has isolated herself, spending every waking minute trying to suppress her growing powers. Her mounting emotions trigger the magic, accidentally setting off an eternal winter that she can't stop. She fears she's becoming a monster and that no one, not even her sister, can help her. This results in her ultimate fear being herself. Elsa’s uncontrollable powers leads her to fear herself as she is scared of hurting others and causing danger.

Elsa's supervising animator was Wayne Unten, who asked for that role because he was fascinated by her complexity. Unten carefully developed Elsa's facial expressions in order to bring out her fear as contrasted against Anna's fearlessness. For their work on designing and animating Elsa, Unten and three other Disney Animation employees later won an award for Outstanding Animated Character in an Animated Feature Motion Picture at the 2013 Visual Effects Society Awards: Joy Johnson, character technical director (rigging); Alexander Alvarado, look development artist (Disney's job title for texture artists); and Chad Stubblefield, modeling supervisor. FX technical director Yoo Jae-hyun worked for a year and a half on creating Elsa's ice-based special effects, including effects associated with her dress.

Producers identified the scene in which Elsa sings "Let It Go" as a pivotal point in the character's development. The scene depicts her choice to "let go" of her fear of using her powers. Character design supervisor Bill Schwab said, "Before 'Let It Go', Elsa is really buttoned up, her hair is up—everything is perfect. During the song, she gives herself permission to be who she is and everything changes—her hair is more wild, her gown is magical. She's finally free—even if she is all alone." Animators designed Elsa's appearance to reflect her metamorphosis; in the beginning, she is shown primarily in restrictive and confining outfits. In a January 2014 interview with John August and Aline Brosh McKenna, Lee disclosed that Lasseter personally helped with conceptualizing Elsa's physical transformation: "[M]y favorite thing about it ... is the actual model for doing it was John Lasseter .... he was a huge help in talking through how we translate that emotional journey ... with the animation ... [H]e got up and he's like, .... 'her hair goes, and she transforms, and she struts,' and he's doing it. He's acting it out."

We imagined what it would be like to be chased out of the kingdom. To have to let go of everything you know and all the people you love. And yet the incredible release you'd have to finally let go of everything you've holding back your entire life.

— Kristen Anderson-Lopez on writing Elsa's song, "Let It Go", and the choice to make her a protagonist rather than a villain.

The scene was also a pivotal point in the development of Elsa's character and was initially planned to depict her becoming evil. Robert Lopez, who composed the song with his wife, Kristen Anderson-Lopez, explained, "Elsa was going to go from being this perfect princess that had tried to keep her personality down her whole life to saying, 'Screw it. I'm gonna be me.'" They had wanted to use the song as a way to gain a better understanding of the character and what she would be like if she was no longer living in fear, which ultimately resulted in her becoming much more complex. The final lyrics and Menzel's "ability to be so fragile and vulnerable and then break into this powerhouse voice" turned the plot around and led to Elsa being revised as a "good" character. She initially attempts to suppress her powers in order to avoid hurting others, particularly Anna, and when she is no longer able to do so, she banishes herself from the kingdom to protect those around her. Lead writer Paul Briggs said that Anna's support is what Elsa needs most when her secret is exposed. "The strength of the family bond is what makes this story so powerful," he explained, "because it's her sibling who's willing to look beyond her powers and stand between her and the world if that's what it takes."

Early concept art depicting a darker version of Elsa inspired by Amy Winehouse.

Elsa's appearance had to be redesigned following her transition from antagonist to protagonist. She was originally drawn in a style similar to other Disney villains, with blue skin and spiky black hair. A few months after the film's release, visual development artist Claire Keane (the daughter of Disney Legend Glen Keane) published early concept art of Elsa that was modeled after the singer Amy Winehouse. At the time, she was imagined as having blue "bouffant" hair as well as "a deep, soulful voice and dramatic mood swings". Lasseter reportedly influenced the creation of the character's much softer final appearance, particularly in regards to her very thick platinum blonde hair, which animators found difficult to design. Art director Michael Giaimo said that while a number of strategies were proposed for Elsa's hair, Lasseter would push the animation team to continue making improvements, saying, "It's not aspirational enough. We want people to feel like this hair is a beautiful statement." During a research trip, producers found that "there are lots of braids" worn by women in Norway; they then hired a stylist from New York named "Danilo" who helped to create a style that would reflect that while still being "a little different". A new animation program called Tonic was invented to assist with the task, and the character's hair ultimately required 420,000 CGI threads. By contrast, Anna was given roughly 140,000 hairs while Rapunzel from Tangled had only required 27,000 CGI threads for her hair.

In early 2018, discussions from within Disney Studios were publicized which centered on Elsa's possible development as lesbian in Frozen II. However, this was later debunked when the Anderson-Lopezes confirmed that Elsa would have no love interest in the film. Lee later explained to Maureen Dowd that they had put the characters through Myers-Briggs tests, and "[i]t really came out that Elsa is not ready for a relationship."

==== Abilities ====
Since Elsa is introduced as a young child at the beginning of the film, animators wanted the first glimpse of her powers to reflect her innocent and fanciful state of mind at the time. This included giving her first snowflakes a simple design. Her snow and ice patterns later become more intricate and complex when she is an adult. Co-effects supervisor Marlon West elaborated, "When Elsa finally lets go and really starts owning her cryokinetic abilities, we wanted the ice and snow that she make to get across the idea that Elsa has now grown up and become this beautiful, elegant, confident and powerful young woman."

Her ice castle, which she creates while singing "Let It Go", was designed to illustrate the maturing of her powers as well as to be "a manifestation of her feelings to the world". The palace is initially beautiful; however, after she is made aware of the destruction she has inadvertently caused, and as she is increasingly vilified and hunted by others, it becomes darker and more distorted, with jagged icicles forming on the walls. The film's design team was uncertain about how it should look and drew out designs for various ice castles filled with snow. Lasseter suggested basing the structure and patterns on snowflakes. For example, an enormous snowflake would serve as the foundation, and the palace would be hexagon-shaped. Lasseter also wanted snowflake patterns to influence the manner in which Elsa creates the palace. "Snowflakes are these tiny little ice crystals that form in mid-air. And when there are changes in temperature and humidity, these snowflakes start growing in a pattern that's known as branching and plating," said co-effects supervisor Dale Mayeda. "[Lasseter] said 'You know, when Elsa builds her ice palace, it would be so amazing if—every step of the way as this castle forms out of thin air—it's just branching and plating, branching and plating all along the way."

Fifty animators worked on the scene in which the castle is built, and one frame required 30 hours to render. They later extended similar techniques to Elsa's clothing. While the traditional Norwegian rosemaling was the inspiration for her costuming early in the film, her ice gown was designed similarly to her palace, with snowflakes heavily influencing the style. Her cape itself is a large snowflake.

== International versions ==
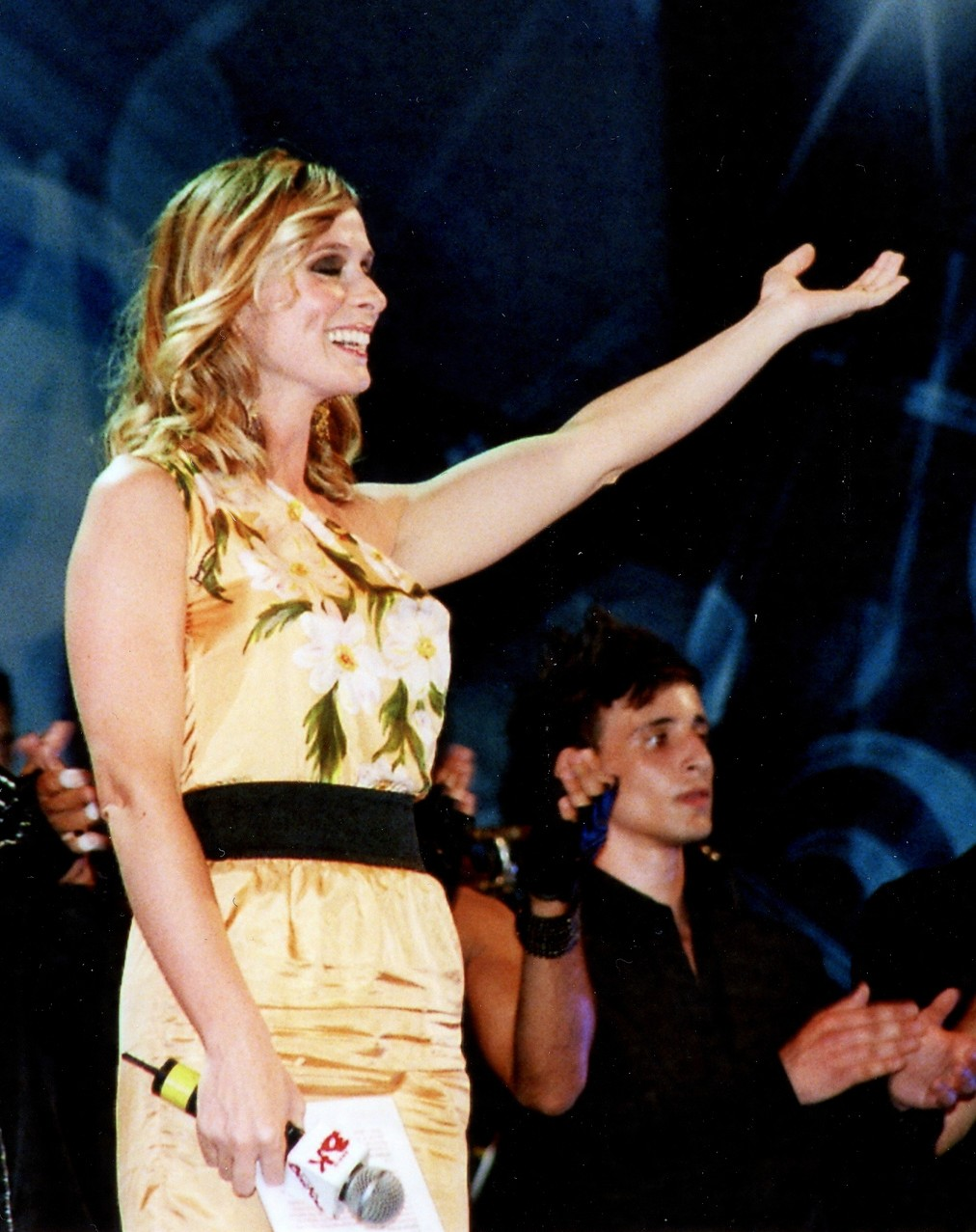
Italian actress and singer Serena Autieri and the Italian cast of Frozen were awarded best foreign dubbing worldwide

A major challenge was to find sopranos capable of matching Menzel's warm vocal tone and vocal range in their native languages. Rick Dempsey, senior executive at Disney Character Voices International regarded the process as "exceptionally challenging", explaining, "It's a difficult juggling act to get the right intent of the lyrics and also have it match rhythmically to the music. And then you have to go back and adjust for lip sync! [It]... requires a lot of patience and precision." Just like Idina Menzel, three of Elsa's dubbers also played the role of Elphaba in Wicked, that is: Maria Lucia Rosenberg (Danish), Willemijn Verkaik (Dutch and German), and Hyena Park (Korean). Serena Autieri, along with the whole Italian version of Frozen, was awarded best foreign dubbing worldwide.

Dutch singer and actress Willemijn Verkaik dubbed Elsa in Dutch (both speaking and singing) and German (singing only), Spanish singer Gisela sang both for the European Spanish and Catalan versions and French singers Anaïs Delva's and Charlotte Hervieux's singing lines from Frozen and Frozen II respectively were also used in the Canadian French version, while Canadian actor Aurélie Morgane voiced Elsa's spoken parts in both films in the Canadian French version. Both Anaïs Delva (French) and Jelena Gavrilović (Serbian) had originally auditioned for Anna's role, but were eventually called back to dub Elsa instead. Priyanka Chopra and her cousin Parineeti Chopra voiced Elsa and Anna respectively in the spoken parts in Frozen 2 in Hindi.

Given the success raised by the song "Let It Go" not only in Menzel's version, but also in its 41 versions originally issued worldwide, on April 15, 2014, Walt Disney Records released a compilation album titled Let It Go: The Complete Set, with all 42 foreign-language film versions of "Let It Go" and nine end credit versions. On the wake of the success of international versions of the first film, on February 9, 2020, when Menzel and Aurora performed the song "Into the Unknown" during the 92nd Academy Awards, nine of Elsa's international dubbers were also called to sing one line each in as many different languages: Maria Rosenberg in Danish, Willemijn Verkaik in German, Takako Matsu in Japanese, Carmen Sarahí in Latin American Spanish, Lisa Stokke in Norwegian, Kasia Łaska in Polish, Anna Buturlina in Russian, Gisela in European Spanish and Gam Wichayanee in Thai. A Sami language version was released as a special dubbing of Frozen 2, with Marianne Pentha voicing Elsa, chosen for the inspiration the film took from the Sami culture.

== Appearances ==
=== Frozen filmography ===
==== Frozen ====
Elsa as a child in Frozen

Elsa first appears at the age of eight, coaxed out of bed one morning by Anna to build a snowman, which they name Olaf. In the course of their play, she accidentally freezes Anna's head. The King and Queen take the sisters to a tribe of trolls. As the tribe's chief Grand Pabbie heals Anna and alters her memory, Elsa learns that her power will grow and she will need to learn to control it. But she fails to gain control and is locked in the castle for many years, separated from her sister, and mostly confined to her room to contain and conceal her power. She is given gloves to help contain her power, but still it grows and she becomes afraid of harming others.

Three years after her parents die at sea, Elsa is crowned as Queen of Arendelle. Despite her worry that her power will be revealed and she will be feared, the coronation occurs without incident. During the reception, although she appears happy with the company of Anna and everybody else, she rejects Anna's request that it be like this all the time. When Anna reveals her engagement to Prince Hans and asks for Elsa's blessing, she refuses and forbids their marriage. During the continuing quarrel, Anna pulls off one of Elsa's gloves, and she unleashes her power in anger. She then flees, unknowingly freezing Arendelle in the process.

On the North Mountain, Elsa casts off restraint, embraces her power where it will not harm anybody, and builds a palace of ice in which to live in solitude. In time Anna, aided by Kristoff and Olaf (whom Elsa had unknowingly recreated and brought to life), arrives at Elsa's palace. But Elsa, concerned for Anna's safety, tries to make her leave. Elsa then learns from Anna that Arendelle is covered in snow, but when Anna pleads for Elsa to return and thaw the kingdom she confesses that she doesn't know how. Elsa again unleashes her power in anger, accidentally freezing Anna's heart before creating a giant snow monster to make Anna, Olaf and Kristoff leave.

Later, the Duke of Weselton, Hans and a group of soldiers invade Elsa's ice palace. She attempts to fight them off with her ice power, but is ultimately captured, placed into a dungeon, cuffed and chained. In time, she manages to free herself.

Outside during a break in a snowstorm, Hans attempts to kill Elsa with his sword, but Anna jumps in at the last moment and blocks the attack, her body freezing solid in the process. Elsa feels sorry for Anna, who then thaws in her arms. Anna confesses her love for Elsa, who finally gains control of her power, realizing that love is the key. The sisters reconcile and return to Arendelle together.

==== Frozen Fever ====
Nearly a year after the events of the first film, Elsa tries to make Anna's 19th birthday as perfect as possible a way of making up for the years they spent apart. To do so, she works heavily with Kristoff, Sven and Olaf to make this a reality. Upon making sure that her surprise party in the palace courtyard is ready, she leaves Kristoff in charge while she goes to get Anna. However, Elsa starts to come down with a cold as she leads Anna on a treasure hunt to find all the gifts that have been made for her. Without realizing it, each sneeze she makes creates small snowmen called "snowgies", which create trouble for Kristoff, Sven and Olaf. As Anna notices Elsa's cold getting worse, she tries in vain to get Elsa to stop exerting herself, even taking medicine from Oaken in case Elsa gets more sick. Unfortunately, Elsa's cold causes her to become very tired and behave in a seemingly intoxicated-like manner, and she almost falls off the Arendelle's clock tower only for Anna to save her. Upon finally admitting to Anna that she is indeed sick after the previous incident, she allows Anna to escort her home feeling she has ruined everything, and finds that the party has gone off successfully for Anna (as well as discovering her snowgie creations), and, still slightly delirious, she ends the party by accidentally sneezing into the birthday bugle horn, which inadvertently sends a gigantic snowball all the way to the Southern Isles and hits the now-demoted Hans, causing him to fall into a pile of horse manure. Afterwards, Anna tells a now bedridden Elsa that she has given her the best birthday ever: letting her take care of her.

==== Olaf's Frozen Adventure ====
Elsa appeared in a 21-minute holiday film along with Anna, Kristoff, Sven, and Olaf, which debuted in theaters for a limited time engagement with Pixar's Coco on November 22, 2017. It made its television debut on ABC on December 14, 2017.

Elsa and Anna host the first Christmas Holiday celebration in Arendelle since Elsa opened up the gate, ringing in the season by ringing the Yule Bell. When the townspeople unexpectedly leave early to enjoy their individual holiday customs, the sisters realize they have no family traditions of their own. Elsa laments the fact that because she had isolated herself most of her life, she and Anna were unable to spend time with each other, prompting Olaf to look for traditions with Sven's help. Meanwhile, she and Anna discover some forgotten items in their attic where they find things from their past before Sven returns to inform them of Olaf's plight. Leading the residents of Arendelle to go look for Olaf, they find him in a nearby forest and cheer him up by revealing that they do have a tradition: After Elsa had shut herself away for years, Anna began annually sliding cards and dolls of Olaf under her door. With that, Elsa and Anna continue the kingdom's festive celebrations.

==== Frozen 2 ====
Thirty-four years prior to the events of the film, King Runeard, the founder and the first king of Arendelle, establishes a treaty with the tribe of Northuldra by building a dam in the Northuldra's homeland, the Enchanted Forest, in order to maintain good relations between the two peoples and to strengthen their power. However, a fight occurs and enrages the spirits of earth, fire, air, and water who inhabit the forest. The spirits disappear and a wall of mist encases everyone in the forest. Runeard's son Prince Agnarr barely escapes with the help of an unknown savior and became a king.

Three years after her coronation, Queen Elsa of Arendelle celebrates autumn in the kingdom with her younger sister Princess Anna, Olaf the snowman, Kristoff the kingdom's ice harvester, and Kristoff's reindeer, Sven. When Elsa hears a mysterious voice calling out to her, she follows it and unintentionally awakens the elemental spirits, which forces everyone in the kingdom to evacuate. Grand Pabbie and the Trolls colony, aware of the situation, arrive at Arendelle and Pabbie informs them that they must set things right by discovering the truth about the kingdom's past.

Elsa, Anna, Olaf, Kristoff, and Sven embark to the Enchanted Forest, following the mysterious voice. The wind spirit, in the form of a tornado, appears and sweeps everyone in its vortex. Elsa stops it by firing streams of snow, forming a set of ice sculptures. They discover the sculptures are images from their father's past. They encounter the Northuldra and a troop of Arendellian soldiers who are still at conflict with one another. The fire spirit appears; Elsa discovers it to be an agitated magical salamander and calms it down. Elsa and Anna form a truce between the soldiers and the Northuldra, and go with them to their camp. Elsa later learns the existence of a fifth spirit who will unite people and the magic of nature, and also discovered that her mother was Northuldra.

Elsa continues to head north with Anna and Olaf. They find their parents' shipwreck and a map with a route to Ahtohallan, a mythical river told by their mother to contain all explanations of the past. Horrified that her parents were lost at sea in search of answers to her magical powers, Elsa decides to travel alone and sends Anna and Olaf away to safety, despite Anna reminding her of their mother's song "Go too far and you'll be drowned". Elsa encounters and tames Nokk, the water spirit who guards the sea to Ahtohallan. Reaching Ahtohallan, Elsa discovers that the voice was the call of Iduna, and that her power was a gift from the magic of nature because of Iduna's selfless act of saving Agnarr, making her the fifth spirit who unites differences. Elsa also learns that the dam was built as a ruse to reduce the Northuldra's resources because of Runeard's dislike of the tribe's connection with magic, and that Runeard was the one who initiated the conflict by killing the leader of the Northuldra. Elsa sends this information to Anna before becoming frozen, having ventured into the most dangerous part of Ahtohallan, which in turn causes Olaf to fade away.

Anna receives Elsa's message and concludes that the dam must be destroyed for peace to be restored, even though that would destroy Arendelle. Anna finds and awakens the sleeping gigantic earth spirits, and lures them towards the dam, which is destroyed by boulders hurled by the giants. Elsa thaws out and returns to Arendelle, stopping a wave from the destroyed dam. As the wall of mist disappears, Elsa reunites with Anna and revives Olaf. Kristoff proposes to Anna, who accepts. Elsa explains that she and Anna now serve as the bridge between the people and the magical spirits, where the bridge has two ends: Anna on the people's side and Elsa on the magical spirits' side. Elsa abdicates the throne of Arendelle to Anna and becomes the protector of the Enchanted Forest. She regularly visits Arendelle as peace is restored throughout the lands.

=== Miscellaneous ===
==== Other appearances in animation ====
Although not members of the group, Elsa and Anna appear with the Disney Princesses in the 2018 film Ralph Breaks the Internet. In one scene, Vanellope Von Schweetz accidentally breaks into the Princess room, where Elsa and other princesses gather together. After a panic, they surround Vanellope and ask why she's here. After learning that Vanellope was a princess, Elsa asks "(Do you have) Magic hands?" while conjuring ice in her hands in front of her. In the climax, Elsa and the princesses spot Ralph about to plummet to his doom from the air. The princesses rally together to rescue the bad guy, using their individual abilities to do so. Moana summons the ocean, which Ariel dives into to swim upward and create a spiral. Jasmine and Elsa fly towards the top using Carpet, from which they are able to join with Ariel. Elsa then uses her powers to create an ice slide for Ralph. After he is saved, the princesses introduce themselves as friends of Vanellope, with Elsa adding that anyone who is Vanellope's friend is their friend as well.

Elsa is also one of the several characters from Walt Disney Animation Studios that appears in the 2023 short film Once Upon a Studio.

==== Merchandise ====
In December 2013, Disney began releasing "Musical Magic Elsa and Anna Dolls", which played their signature songs that appear in the film. Numerous other doll versions of Elsa were released for purchase, including fashion doll sets, mini dolls, plush dolls, and Elsa-as-a-toddler dolls. A dress up costume for children was modeled after Elsa's ice gown along with gloves similar to ones she wears in the film. Together with Anna, she was depicted on various Frozen-inspired dishware such as plates and coffee mugs. Other Elsa-inspired merchandise includes luggage, nightgowns, and home décor. Additionally, simplified versions of the film were adapted to children's storybooks, including one with voice audio and another called A Sister More Like Me that was illustrated by Brittney Lee. Elsa and Anna also both appear as playable characters in Disney Infinity through the use of their corresponding figurines.

In early 2014, most Frozen merchandise, including dolls and dresses, were sold out nearly everywhere, including Disney stores and theme parks. In early November 2014, Disney announced that it had sold over three million Frozen costumes in North America alone, of which Elsa was the no. 1 best-selling Disney costume of all time, followed by Anna at no. 2. Hallmark created a Queen Elsa Christmas tree ornament after much interest was expressed when the Olaf ornament was announced in 2014.

==== Theme parks ====
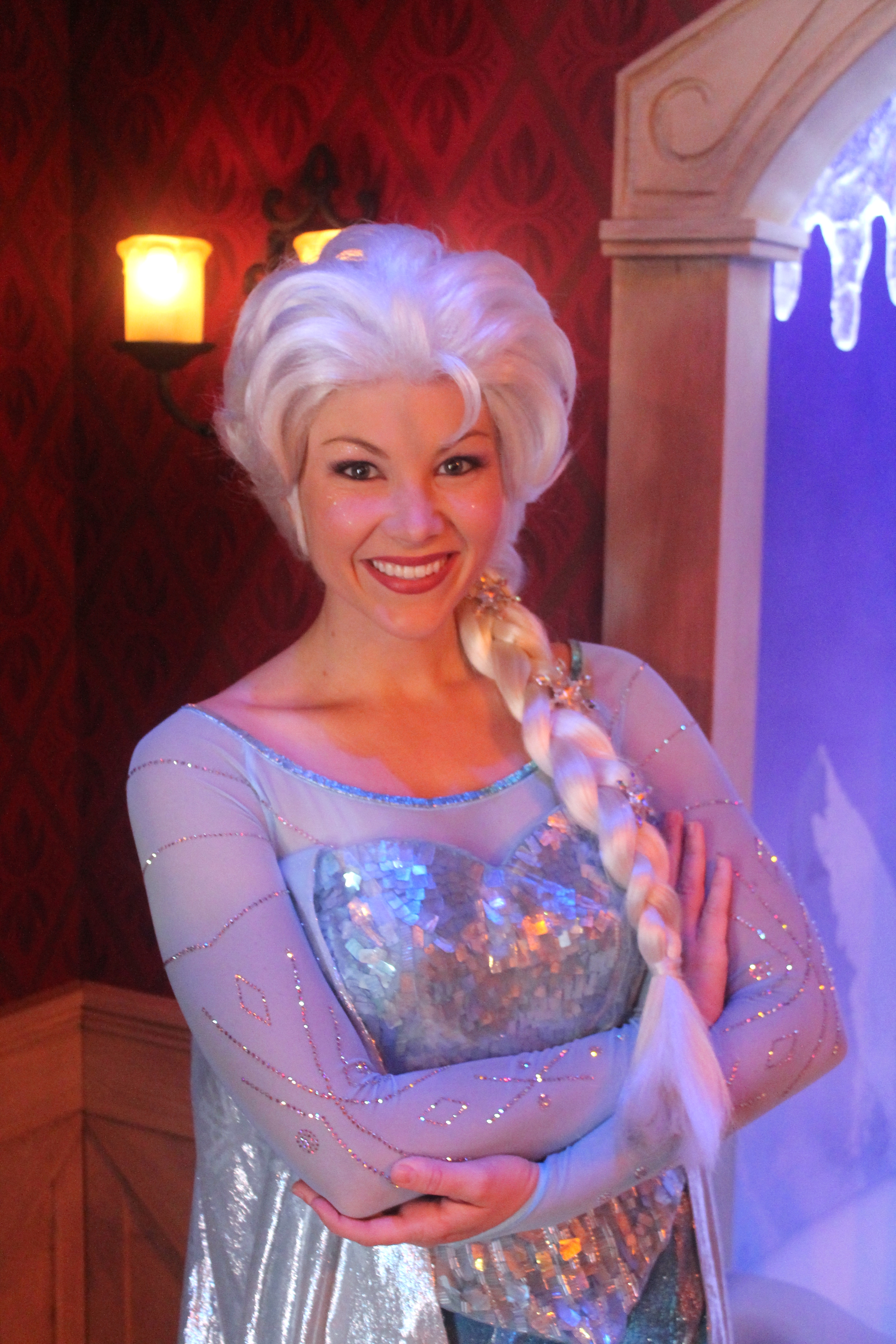
Elsa meet-and-greet at Disneyland in California in 2013.

In November, before the release of Frozen, Anna and Elsa began making appearances at Walt Disney Parks and Resorts in Florida and California through meet and greets. In Walt Disney World, the attractions were set up in the Norway Pavilion of Epcot in recognition of the Scandinavian cultural elements that went into the film's design. In Disneyland, a winter-themed cottage was set up in the Fantasyland section, with a talking audio-animatronic Olaf sitting on the cottage roof. In February 2014, these meet-and-greet sessions were extended indefinitely, with wait time to meet the princesses frequently exceeding two hours, which is longer than any previous Disney characters. Additionally, Elsa, Anna, and Olaf were given a Frozen-themed float for Disneyland Paris' Disney Magic on Parade. On March 9, 2014, the three made appearances again on their own Frozen parade float in Festival of Fantasy Parade at Magic Kingdom theme park. On April 20, 2014, Anna and Elsa moved from Epcot to the Princess Fairytale Hall at Magic Kingdom, with wait time to see the characters amounted to three hours, compared to Cinderella's and Rapunzel's 15 minutes.

Elsa's performance of "Let It Go" became the central feature in Disney California Adventure's Winter Dreams, a 30-minute, winter-themed adaption of the nighttime show World of Color, which showcases scenes from Disney films. Disneyland Paris' nighttime spectacular, Disney Dreams!, also added Elsa's performance of "Let It Go" to their attractions, and she was given a similar role during the Magic Kingdom show, Celebrate the Magic, with her singing interspersed with scenes from the film.

On May 16, 2014, it was announced that Disneyland would debut a Frozen pre-parade featuring Elsa, Anna and Olaf. It premiered June 13, 2014, and preceded performances of Mickey's Soundsational Parade. From July 5 to September 1, 2014, as part of 'Frozen' Summer Fun show at Disney's Hollywood Studios, Anna and Elsa will appear in a horse-drawn sleigh making their way down Hollywood Boulevard, alongside Kristoff and skaters, skiers and ice cutters in the Anna and Elsa's Royal Welcome section. The sisters also made appearances in For the First Time in Forever: A "Frozen" Sing-Along Celebration, where they were joined by royal historians to retell the history of Arendelle; and "Frozen" Fireworks Spectacular alongside Kristoff and Olaf, a fireworks display set to the music of Frozen. In response to strong demand, Disney Parks subsequently announced on August 7 that Frozen Summer Fun would be extended to September 28.

On August 19, 2014, it was initially announced that Elsa & Anna's Boutique (replacing Studio Disney 365) would open mid-September in Downtown Disney at the Disneyland Resort. The opening date was later changed to October 6, 2014, and the store name was changed to "Anna & Elsa's Boutique". The location includes products inspired by Anna, Elsa, and Olaf.

While there had not been any official announcements from Disney regarding a coronation for Anna and Elsa, it had been announced in late August 2014 that a special character meal would be held by a group of travel agents in the morning of September 24, 2014. While not officially organized by Disney, the event, called My Royal Coronation, would feature the official Anna and Elsa characters owned by Disney with assistance from the company. On September 12, 2014, Walt Disney World announced that a Frozen attraction was scheduled to open in early 2016 at Epcot's World Showcase in the Norway pavilion, replacing the park's Maelstrom ride. The attraction features the kingdom of Arendelle with music and scenes from the film, as well as meet-and-greets with Anna and Elsa. Anna, Elsa, Kristoff, and Olaf will make appearances in Mickey's Once Upon a Christmastime Parade, offered during Mickey's Very Merry Christmas Party at Magic Kingdom in November and December 2014 (from November 7 to December 31). Also starting from November, every night Elsa will use her powers to transform Cinderella Castle into an ice palace.

On November 13, 2014, prior to "A Sparkling Christmas" Event, Anna and Elsa began meet-and-greet sessions at Hong Kong Disneyland.

Beginning December 20, 2014, the Anna and Elsa meet and greet at Disneyland Resort was moved from Disneyland park to a new location in the Disney Animation Building called "Anna and Elsa's Royal Welcome" in Disney California Adventure. In addition, the Storybook Land Canal Boats at Disneyland were updated to include the village of Arendelle from the film, including Anna and Elsa's castle and Elsa's ice palace. Officially starting January 7, 2015, Elsa began making appearances alongside Anna and Kristoff at Disney California Adventure in "For the First Time in Forever—A Frozen Sing-Along Celebration" in Hollywood Land as part of the park's "Frozen Fun" event. Also starting January 7, Anna and Elsa made appearances in a Frozen play at the Royal Theatre in Disneyland park.

Beginning May 22, 2015, Disneyland debuted a new nighttime parade called "Paint the Night", which includes a Frozen float featuring Anna, Elsa, and Olaf, as part of the park's 60th anniversary celebration.

==== Cosplay ====
Elsa has become very popular in the cosplaying community. Cosplayer Anna Faith is well known for cosplaying as Elsa at charities, comic-cons, and other events.

==== Once Upon a Time ====
A version of Queen Elsa appears at the conclusion of the ABC fantasy drama series Once Upon a Time's third season, released from an urn in which she had been sealed. She walks into Storybrooke searching for Anna. In the fourth season, she forges an ice wall that seals the town in, and learns she has a long-lost aunt named Ingrid who has the same ice powers as her. She is a proponent of Emma Swan and Killian Jones' then-budding relationship. She is portrayed by Georgina Haig.

==== Broadway musical ====
Caissie Levy originated the role of Elsa in the Broadway musical, which opened in March 2018. Ciara Renée succeeded Levy in the role in 2020. Other notable actresses who have played the part include Caroline Bowman in the North American tour and Samantha Barks in the West End production. Barks also portrays Elsa in the filmed version of the musical, which was released to Disney+ in 2025. The Broadway adaptation includes several new original songs for Elsa including "Dangerous to Dream" and "Monster".

==== Video games ====
Elsa appears in Kingdom Hearts III, with Idina Menzel reprising the role.

== Reception ==
=== Critical reviews ===
"Not content to merely turn True Love into a cautionary tale, [the writers] doubled down and made Elsa into [a] flawed hero warped by her upbringing and parents' heartfelt but damaging desire to keep their children safe...Elsa is aloof. And scared. And over-protective. And insecure. And full of guilt. Because people—even animated people—are the sum total of their personalities combined with their experiences. Which is something even live action films forget at least 63% of the time."
—Donna Dickens, entertainment editor.

The character of Elsa was widely praised by reviewers for her multifaceted, evolving personality. Matt Goldberg of Collider.com commented that she was "an incredibly sympathetic character", while Deepanjana Pal of Firstpost praised the decision to rewrite her as a protagonist and said, "Elsa is no evil, frosty vision of twisted and toxic maternity like the original Snow Queen. She's a young woman in difficult circumstances, frightened, trying to understand her abilities and burdened by expectation and convention. It's easy to sympathise with her and marvel at her ability when she builds her spectacular palace in the mountains. Next to her, Anna is very much a child who needs to grow up and she does in the course of the film." Stuff.co.nz's James Croot compared her "humiliation and exile" to that of Simba in The Lion King. Katherine Webb, a reviewer for Wall St. Cheat Sheet, said that the scenes depicting Elsa gaining confidence and individuality delivered "an exciting message to send to young girls looking for a new princess role model". Gary Wright of Rotoscopers stated "Her mental anguish and uncontrollable powers define modern feminism. Elsa represents the boundless female spirit- strong and graceful, with the power to change the world."

Travis Bean of Cedar Falls Times suggested that Elsa's ice powers, a "personal oddity" that made her self-conscious, as well as her selflessness in withdrawing into isolation in order to avoid hurting others allowed children to connect more with the plot of Frozen. Laurie Levy from Chicago Now wrote that her young grandchildren "admired Elsa for being smart, strong, magical, and powerful" and did not care that she had no romantic subplot. Magdalena Lachowicz, a film critic for The Heights, opined that Elsa's relationship with Anna was the most important part of the film, and Stephen Holden of The New York Times liked that, in departure from traditional Disney formula, it was a sibling's love rather than romantic love that was able to "thaw the icy heart of the frightened Elsa". Tony Hicks of San Jose Mercury News wrote, "[Anna's] confusion and Elsa's anguish as she shuts herself away from the world—and her sister—is palatable." Emma Koonse of Christian Post opined that together the sisters were Disney's "most lovable and charismatic characters yet", and Debbie Lynn Elias of Culver City Observer commented, "Elsa and Anna are like two sides of a coin, both strong, albeit one through power and confidence and the other through clumsy sticktuitiveness and love." Polygon staff ranked her as one of their "69 biggest crushes of the last decade" and stated it "That moment in 'Let it Go' when she lets her hair down, changes into her ice dress, and does that little shimmy."

Several reviewers commented that Elsa was more interesting than Anna, Frozen's primary protagonist. ABS-CBN writer Fred Hawson described Elsa as "an incredible character with a unique and interesting predicament because of the powers she possessed" and expressed the opinion that Frozen should have focused more on her rather than Anna. Samra Muslim of The Express Tribune wrote that it was her presence that kept viewers "hooked" throughout the film, elaborating, "Her character is complex and sympathetic and deserved to be explored even further. Instead the story revolves more around the relationship of the two sisters and Anna who is the typical, feisty, charming Disney heroine and her love trysts—instead of the alluring Elsa."

The character was not devoid of criticism. Charlotte O'Sullivan from the London Evening Standard gave a more negative assessment of Elsa, saying that she "resembles one of those brittle mentors on The X Factor. Purple eyeshadow, tiny waist, kitten heels". Anna Smith of The Guardian disliked that both Elsa and Anna were drawn with slender figures and large eyes as is typical of Disney princesses. Slate's Dana Stevens wrote that "it's impossible not to thrill to Elsa's surging sense of power" but criticized the choice to illustrate her growing confidence by changing her appearance; Stevens further expressed concern that the switch from the character's modest coronation gown to "a slinky, slit-to-the-thigh dress with a transparent snowflake-patterned train and a pair of silver-white high heels" and a hairstyle that suggested "come-hither bad-girl seduction" was overly sexual. Christy Lemire, writing for RogerEbert.com, compared Elsa to Carrie White, another well-known fictional female who unleashes magical powers when agitated.

==== "Let It Go" ====
Idina Menzel also received praise for her singing, with Amon Warmann of Cine Vue saying her voice "positively soars in these musical ballads". Reviewers frequently focused on her performance of "Let It Go", described by Entertainment Weekly's Marc Snetiker as "an incredible anthem of liberation" in which Elsa decides to no longer fear her powers. Linda Barnard from The Star commented that Menzel "can shatter icicles with her powerful voice".

Matt DeTruck of The Rochester City Newspaper wrote, "Menzel should be credited for providing as much power and passion to this performance as she did in her most famous role." Donald Clark of Irish Times added, "Elsa's flight to the glaciers triggers a song that, in its defiant paean to self-reliance, could play comfortably beside camp showtune anthems such as I Am What I Am and Don't Rain on My Parade. The opening and closing choruses of Let It Go end with a sly, spat-out refrain: 'The cold never bothered me anyway!' You go, girl." Nasim Asl of The Oxford Student continued, "Menzel, especially, steals the show with her performance of 'Let It Go'. Her Wicked-esque belting out works perfectly with such an incredible animated sequence—the building of the ice castle really demonstrates the prowess of Disney animation, and results in, arguably, one of the most spectacular power ballads seen by any animated character, ever."

=== Mental health ===
Frozen has been used to promote mental health awareness for children. Jay Boll described Frozen as "a story of emotional dysregulation", with Elsa being the perfect metaphor for mental illness. "For the first time in a Disney animated feature, the villain is really the enemy within. Frozen has a minor bad guy whose true colors do not show until late in the story but the real antagonist is Elsa herself, as she battles with her inner demons."

Psychologist Nadia Ali of The Washington Post states that Elsa's behavior was strongly identical to her patients, trying to control and hide the evidence of their struggles for mental health – and the loneliness they often feel in doing so. "She [Elsa] sits slumped against the door of her room, forlorn and in despair... In this particular shot, Elsa and her bedroom are colored in dark shades. She sits alone with her demons after having tried unsuccessfully for most of her life to control and hide her powers, a task which has isolated her and torn her family apart."

"Self-isolating, immobilized by the weight of personal expectations, and largely unable to experience joy, Elsa is the Anxious Girl's heroine", stated Jenny Singer of Glamour magazine. "Cinderella is an indentured servant, Moana is tasked with saving her people from mass starvation, and Belle is both a kidnapping victim and an adult literacy instructor, but they each maintain the cheeriness of Mrs. Maisel after an extra-large cold brew. That's the way some people function, and how nice for them! But... Elsa is the queen of feeling fear without succumbing to its darkness. She doesn't conquer her fear. She doesn't vanquish it. She lives with it."

=== Accolades ===
In December 2013, Elsa and Anna were both nominated for Best Animated Female by the Alliance of Women Film Journalists, with only Anna winning the award, a few weeks later. Elsa won all three awards out of three nominations at the 2013 Visual Effects Society Awards, including Outstanding Animated Character in an Animated Feature Motion Picture, Outstanding Created Environment in an Animated Feature Motion Picture for her ice palace, and Outstanding FX and Simulation Animation in an Animated Feature Motion Picture for her blizzard. Her signature song, "Let It Go", won Best Original Song at the Academy Awards, a Grammy Award, the Phoenix Film Critics Society Awards and the Critics' Choice Awards, and also received Golden Globe Award, the Satellite Awards, the Broadcast Film Critics Association Award, and the Houston Film Critics Society Award nominations. Time ranked Elsa as the most influential fictional character of 2014.
