= Ride & Show Engineering, Inc. =

American company

- Company type: Privately owned
- Industry: Engineering services
- Founded: 1984
- Founder: Eduard Feuer and William Watkins
- Products: Entertainment attractions, show action equipment, and transportation systems
- Website: www.rideshow.com

Ride & Show Engineering, Inc. is an American private company that conceptualizes, develops, and builds attractions, show action equipment, and transportation systems. In 1984 Eduard Feuer and William Watkins, the former Senior Project Engineer and Chief Mechanical Engineer, respectively, for Walt Disney Imagineering, established Ride & Show in California.

Ride & Show designs, engineers and fabricates simulation and motion base systems, boat ride systems, and people movers; floor-mounted ride systems for dark ride attractions; monorails; and numerous show action and special effect equipment for large and small entertainment projects worldwide.

== Industries ==
Ride & Show's clientele extend beyond typical amusement parks and range into:

- Retail and location-based entertainment
- Theme park attractions
- Transportation and ride systems
- Large show equipment and stages
- Science centers and museums

== Projects ==
Ride & Show's first project was to redesign and rehabilitate the chassis and install new bodies for the Disneyland Mark V monorails for Messerchmitt-Bölkow-Blohm (MBB) of Germany. Shortly thereafter Disney contracted Ride & Show to design and supply the Maelstrom boat ride system for the Norway Pavilion attraction at Epcot.

The company has created and developed a number entertainment and specialty projects in a variety of forms.

=== Completed entertainment projects ===
Client	Location	Project	Role	Completion Date	Notes
Messerschmitt-Bölkow-Blohm (MBB)	Disneyland, Anaheim, California	Mark V Monorail	Engineering & Refurbishment	1987	Transportation System
MCA	Universal Studios Hollywood, California	King Kong	Engineering, fabrication and installation of the tramway motion bridge	1986	Show Action Equipment
MCA	Universal Studios, Hollywood, California	Miami Vice Action Spectacular	Engineering, Fabrication and installation of helicopter, mine train and falling tower	1987	Show Action Equipment
Disney	EPCOT, Orlando, Florida	Maelstrom	Engineering, fabrication & installation of the Boat Ride System	1988	Boat Ride System
MCA	Universal Studios Hollywood, California	Earthquake: The Big One	Engineering, fabrication and installation of the tramway simulator platform	1989	Show Action Equipment
Ridewerks, Ltd.	Burbank, California	Turbo Tour Motion Theaters	Engineering & Development of 3-axis Motion Theater	1990	Joint Venture Partnership with Iwerks Entertainment
MCA	Universal Studios Florida, Orlando, Florida	Earthquake: The Big One	Engineering, Fabrication & Installation	1990	Tram Motion Ride System & Show Action Equipment
MCA	Universal Studios Florida, Orlando, Florida	Jaws	Engineering, Fabrication & Installation	1990	Boat Ride System & Large Animation
Hong Kong Science Museum	Hong Kong Science Museum, Kowloon, Hong Kong	The Energy Machine	Engineering, Fabrication & Installation	1991	Museum's Signature Exhibit
Denbies Co.	Denbies Wine Estate, Dorking, United Kingdom	Indoor Wine Tour	Design, Engineering, Fabrication & Installation	1991	Ride System
Papalote Museo del Nino	Papalote Children's Museum, Mexico City, Mexico	Interactive Ball & Rail Machine	Design, Engineering, Fabrication & Installation	1992	
Toyo Engineering Corp.	Shima Spain Village, Isobe, Japan	Adventure Lagoon	Show Design, Engineering, Fabrication & Installation	1993	Turnkey Attraction – Boat Ride and Show Systems
Taiwan Folk Village	Taiwan Folk Village, Taichung, Taiwan	Adventures of Cheng Ho	Show Design, Engineering, Fabrication & Installation	1995	Boat Ride Show Systems
Museum of Discovery and Science	Museum of Discovery and Science, Ft. Lauderdale, Florida	The Great Gravity Clock	Design, Engineering, Fabrication & Installation	1995	
Schwager Davis Inc.	Buffalo Bills & Primadonna Hotels, Primm, Nevada	Unitrak Monorail	Engineering, Fabrication & Installation	1998	Transportation System
USJ LLC	Universal Studios Japan, Osaka, Japan	Back to the Future: The Ride	Engineering, Fabrication & Installation of Pre-show Ball & Rail	2001	
Taipei Astronomical Museum	Taipei Astronomical Museum, Taipei, Taiwan	Cosmic Adventure	Engineering, Fabrication & Installation	2002	Turnkey Attraction Omnimover and Show Systems
Kangwon Land Casino & Resort	Kangwon Land, Sabuk, South Korea	Alien Encounter	Design, Engineering, Fabrication & Installation	2004	Turnkey Attraction
Battaglia Inc.	Lotte World, Seoul, South Korea	Pharaoh's Fury	Design, Engineering, Fabrication & Installation of Special Effects & Show Action Equipment	2005	

=== Completed performance stage projects ===
Client	Location	Project	Role	Completion Date	Notes
House of Blues	Sunset Blvd., Hollywood, California	Swinging Bar & Stage	Engineering, Fabrication & Installation	1994	
House of Blues	Chicago, Illinois	Stage	Engineering, Fabrication & Installation	1996	
House of Blues	Myrtle Beach, South Carolina	Stage	Engineering, Fabrication & Installation	1997	
House of Blues	Downtown Disney, Orlando, Florida	Stage	Engineering, Fabrication & Installation	1998	
Virgin Megastore	Downtown Disney, Orlando, Florida	Virgin Megastore	Engineering, Fabrication & Installation	1998	Performance Platform and Canopy Entrance

=== Completed specialized engineering projects ===
Client	Location	Project	Role	Completion Date	Notes
Self-Realization Fellowship	Self-Realization Fellowship Lake Shrine, Pacific Palisades, California	Mahatma Gandhi World Peace Memorial	Engineering, Fabrication & Installation	1998	Canopy Structure
Flowserve Corporation	Multiple Locations	Hydraulic Vehicles	Engineering and Fabrication	1998-2008	For the removal of motors in nuclear power plants
The Archdiocese of Los Angeles	Cathedral of Our Lady of the Angels, Los Angeles, California	The Great Bronze Doors	Engineering, Fabrication & Installation	2002	50,000 lb. Doors with 300-year design life
Dynamics Research		US Army Training Simulator	Fabrication	2006	Simulator steel platform and aluminum cab structures

== Patents ==
Ride & Show Engineering has been assigned four patents in the entertainment industry.

- Amusement ride car system with multiple axis rotation, which pairs ride car systems with programmable controllers to direct patrons view of the show sets and scenery within an attraction. The invention was a significant improvement over previous mechanical cam systems utilized to achieve this result.
- Flight simulator which provides for independent control of rotation about the pitch and roll axis including the capability for complete inversion of an occupant in the cockpit.
- Flight simulator with full 360 degree rotation capability about the roll axis.
- Inverted simulation attraction where the ride cars are suspended from the track and the cars are pointed in various directions to view specific portions of the attraction and a motion base allows for simulated movement

== Sources ==
- McNary, Dave (July 26, 1987). "Fantasies make San Dimas firm boom". Tribune/News. p. H1
- McNary, Dave (July 26, 1987). "Disneyland monorails getting a major facelift". Tribune/News. p. H1
- Parisi, Paula (November 18, 1993). "IAAPA event a thrill a minute". The Hollywood Reporter.
- Dreyer, Evan (December 20, 1993). "Theme Park in Oceanside considered". The North County Times. p. A-1
- Shaer, Ruth (April 1999). "San Dimas Engineering Company Specializes in Theme Attractions". San Gabriel Valley Business Journal. p. 1, 3, 4
- Benson, Don and Drummer, Randyl (May 15, 2000). "Inland Empire Focus: Exporters win honors for globalizing trade". The Business Press/California.
- Luna, Rene (October 11, 2000). "Design firm has some magic of its own". Inland Valley Times. p. 2
- Bradvica, David (May 20, 2002). "Cardinal Mahony blesses doors for L.A. cathedral". Inland Valley Daily Bulletin. p. A3
- Miles, Jack (2002). "The Great Bronze Doors for the Cathedral of Our Lady of the Angels". Wave Publishing. p. 108-125
