= Eduard Feuer =

American mechanical engineer

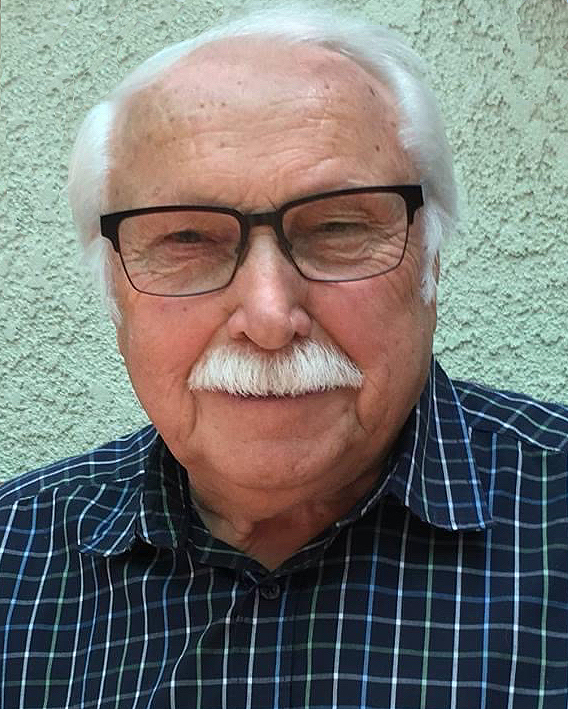
- Feuer in 2018
- Born: 1936 (age 89–90); Lviv, Ukraine
- Occupations: Mechanical engineer and entrepreneur

Eduard Feuer (born 1936) is a German-American mechanical engineer and Imagineer. His most notable works as project engineer are the American Adventure and World of Motion pavilions for Walt Disney's EPCOT Center (now known as Epcot), the Disneyland Mark V and Walt Disney World Mark IV monorails, as well as the Great Bronze Doors of the Cathedral of Our Lady of the Angels in Los Angeles, California.

Feuer co-founded Ride & Show Engineering, Inc. in 1984 with Bill Watkins the Chief Mechanical Engineer at WED Enterprises (renamed Walt Disney Imagineering in 1986).

== Early life and education ==
Eduard Feuer was born on January 18, 1936, in the Ukrainian Village of Lviv, fled to Poland at the outset of WWII, eventually ending up as refugees in West Germany at the end of the war. At 14 he worked as a machinist and then continued his education at the Fachhochschule Braunschweig/Wolfenbuttel, where he received a degree in mechanical engineering "Dipl. Ing. F.H." 1958.

Feuer continued his education at UCLA Extension 1980-1981 and became a California licensed Professional Mechanical Engineer in 1982 (Lic. No. M21286) and a Nevada Professional Mechanical Engineer in 1999 (Lic. No. 013056).

== Career ==
Feuer began his career in 1958 with Ahlborn GmbH in Hildesheim, Germany where he designed an automated butter-making system that separated the cream from the butter mechanically. In 1965, Feuer, with his wife and two children, immigrated to the US and began working at Tubular Aircraft in Los Angeles, California.

In 1966, Feuer began his career as an Imagineer at WED Enterprises (renamed Walt Disney Imagineering in 1986) and was instrumental in the design and development of major ride systems at Disneyland, Walt Disney World, Epcot Center and Tokyo Disneyland, including design engineering work for the Matterhorn, Pirates of the Caribbean, Haunted Mansion and Omnimovers at Disneyland, Walt Disney World, and Tokyo Disneyland. His first engineering project at Disney was the Mark III Monorail.

Feuer was the project engineer for the design of the lifts and stages for the American Adventure pavilion and the ride system for the World of Motion pavilion at Epcot.

Feuer was the project engineer for Mark V Monorail prior to leaving Disney in 1985 and co-founding Ride & Show Engineering, Inc. with Bill Watkins the Chief Engineer at Imagineering. The company's first project was to redesign and rehabilitate the chassis and install new bodies for the Disneyland Mark V monorail together with Messerschmitt Bolkow Blohm (MBB) of Germany. Disney contracted Ride & Show in 1987 to design and supply the Norway Pavilion boat ride system at Epcot.

In 1988, Feuer and Watkins collaborated with past Disney Imagineers Don Iwerks and David Snyder to create a three-axis motion theater, the TurboTour Theater, for the Ride & Show and Iwerks joint venture company Ridewerks, Ltd. The TurboRide theater was probably one of the most successful product lines ever produced in specialty attractions.

Feuer, with his company, designed and produced the House of Blues stage and swinging bar on Sunset Strip in West Hollywood, as well as the stages for House of Blues in Chicago, Orlando and Myrtle Beach. SPF: architects principal Zoltan Pali collaborated with Feuer and his company to design and produce the stage lifts, performance platform and canopy entrance for the Virgin Megastore at Downtown Disney (now known as Disney Springs) in Orlando, Florida.

Artist and sculptor Robert Graham commissioned Feuer and his company to design, engineer and fabricate the 50,000 lb Great Bronze Doors for the Cathedral of Our Lady of the Angels in Los Angeles.

== Technical achievements ==
Feuer holds three patents in ride entertainment technologies. He is one of the inventors of an 'Amusement ride car system with multiple axis rotation', which pairs ride car systems with programmable controllers to direct patrons view of the show sets and scenery within an attraction. The invention was a significant improvement over previous mechanical cam systems utilized to achieve this result.

Feuer is also one of the inventors of an entertainment 'Flight Simulator with Full Roll Rotation Capability' allowing for a continuous roll.

== Sources ==
- McNary, Dave (July 26, 1987). "Fantasies make San Dimas firm boom". Tribune/News. p. H1
- McNary, Dave (July 26, 1987). "Disneyland monorails getting a major facelift". Tribune/News. p. H1
- Parisi, Paula (November 18, 1993). "IAAPA event a thrill a minute". The Hollywood Reporter.
- Dreyer, Evan (December 20, 1993). "Theme Park in Oceanside considered". The North County Times. p. A-1
- Shaer, Ruth (April 1999). "San Dimas Engineering Company Specializes in Theme Attractions". San Gabriel Valley Business Journal. p. 1, 3, 4
- Benson, Don and Drummer, Randyl (May 15, 2000). "Inland Empire Focus: Exporters win honors for globalizing trade". The Business Press/California.
- Bradvica, David (May 20, 2002). "Cardinal Mahony blesses doors for L.A. cathedral". Inland Valley Daily Bulletin. p. A3
- Miles, Jack (2002). "The Great Bronze Doors for the Cathedral of Our Lady of the Angels". Wave Publishing. p. 108-125
