= Anna Faith =

American cosplayer

- Born: Ariana Faith Carlson; November 21, 1995 (age 30); Daytona Beach, Florida, U.S.
- Occupation: Instagram model Influencer marketing
- Years active: 2011–present

Ariana Faith Carlson (born November 21, 1995), known professionally as Anna Faith, is an Instagram model and cosplayer from Florida. She is best known for impersonating the character of Queen Elsa from the Disney animated film Frozen.

== Early life ==
Carlson grew up with her sister Lexie Grace in Daytona Beach, Florida. Her parents are Jim and Karen Carlson. Her mother created the Elsa dress that she wears when performing. She has been publicly performing and modelling since she was in the second grade. She graduated high school in 2014. Her sister, Lexie Grace, portrays the other famous character from Frozen, Princess Anna.

== Career ==
She gained notable widespread media coverage in 2014 when she was discovered on Instagram as an Elsa look-alike. Carlson has reportedly been an extra in several films. She was invited to be an escort at a royal party in the United Arab Emirates. Carlson and her sister have appeared on radio stations, TV shows, and magazines. They have a fan base of over 1 million social media followers. She was named one of the top ten most popular cosplayers in the world.

Carlson started to branch out and cosplay as characters from other films and comic books, including Rey from Star Wars and Harley Quinn from Batman. Anna has portrayed characters from Harry Potter, Maleficent, Cinderella, and Spider-Man, among others. Carlson and her sister are known as the 'Frost Sisters'. Carlson appears at cons and other events, serves as a model. She was named one of the Top 7 Sexiest Cosplayers in 2015. Articles about her Frozen resemblance have been featured on Playboy.

Carlson's cosplay of Harley Quinn received attention in 2016 when she was compared to Margot Robbie's portrayal of Harley Quinn in the movie Suicide Squad. Her versatility while cosplaying has been touted. Carlson was named "Queen of Disney Cosplay" for her work portraying various Disney Princesses.

Following the release of Fantastic Beasts and Where to Find Them, Carlson cosplayed as Queenie Goldstein in January 2017 during the annual A Celebration of Harry Potter fan event that took place at Universal Orlando. She debuted her new cosplay as Wonder Woman in April 2017 where she was recognized at C2E2 as one of the best cosplayers to appear at the Chicago Comic and Entertainment Expo.

== Personal life ==
Faith revealed in 2019 that she had breast augmentation in an emotional Twitter thread.

== Other work ==
She also entertains cancer patients. Carlson and her sister travel together with their mother and manager Karen for hospital visits, charity events, fundraisers, and schools.

== Filmography ==
=== Film ===
Year	Film	Role	Notes
2011	Dolphin Tale	Extra	
TBD	Waves of Grace	Extra	

=== TV series ===
Year	Series	Role	Notes
2014	Access Hollywood	Queen Elsa	Episode dated 4 June 2014
