= Eva Bella =

American actress

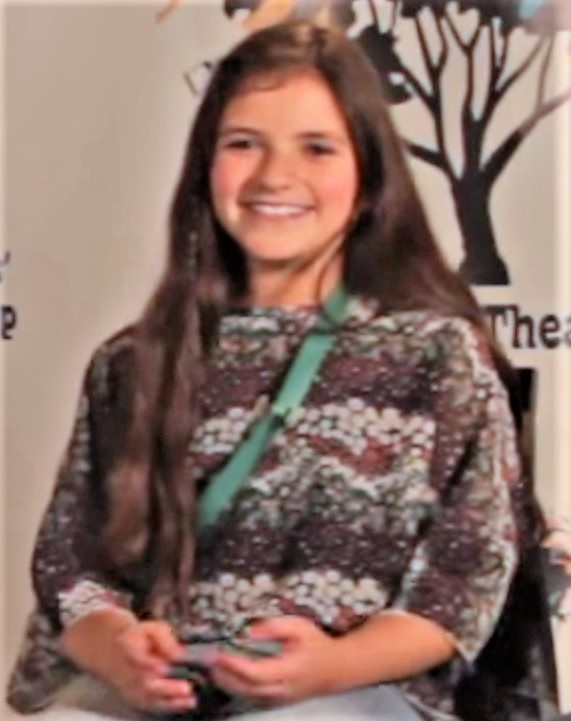
- Bella at Young Actors Theatre Camp in 2014
- Born: Omaha, Nebraska, U.S.
- Occupation: Actress
- Years active: 2011–present

Eva Bella is an American actress, known as the voice of young Elsa in the Disney film Frozen.

== Early life ==
Eva Bella was born around 2004 in Omaha, Nebraska. She has been acting since the age of seven, her first role being for a television commercial. She has had roles in several movies and television shows since then, most notably as the voice of young Elsa in Frozen and Frozen II and as Shimmer in Shimmer and Shine.

== Filmography ==
=== Film ===
Year	Title	Role	Notes
2011	Snowflake, the White Gorilla	Wendy	Voice; English version
2013	The Wind Rises	Young Kayo	Voice; English version
2013	Frozen	Young Elsa	Voice
2016	Bling	Young Sue	Voice
2016	Jessica Darling's It List	Sara	
2017	Reds and Grays	Young Meryl	Voice
2017	Olaf's Frozen Adventure	Young Elsa	Voice
2019	Frozen 2	Young Elsa	Archive audio

=== Television ===
Year	Title	Role	Notes
2013	Maron	Miley	Episode: "Projections"
2013	Sam & Cat	Emily	Episode: "#SecretSafe"
2014	Feed Me	Gwen	Episode: "The Goal of Sexual Intercourse"
2014	Clarence	Little Girl	Voice, 2 episodes
2015	Mad Men	Julie	Episode: "Lost Horizon"
2015–2017	Whisker Haven	Bloom	Voice, 2 episodes
2015–2020	Shimmer and Shine	Shimmer	Voice, main role

=== Video games ===
Year	Title	Role	Notes
2019	Kingdom Hearts III	Young Elsa	Archive audio
