= Anaïs Delva =

French singer

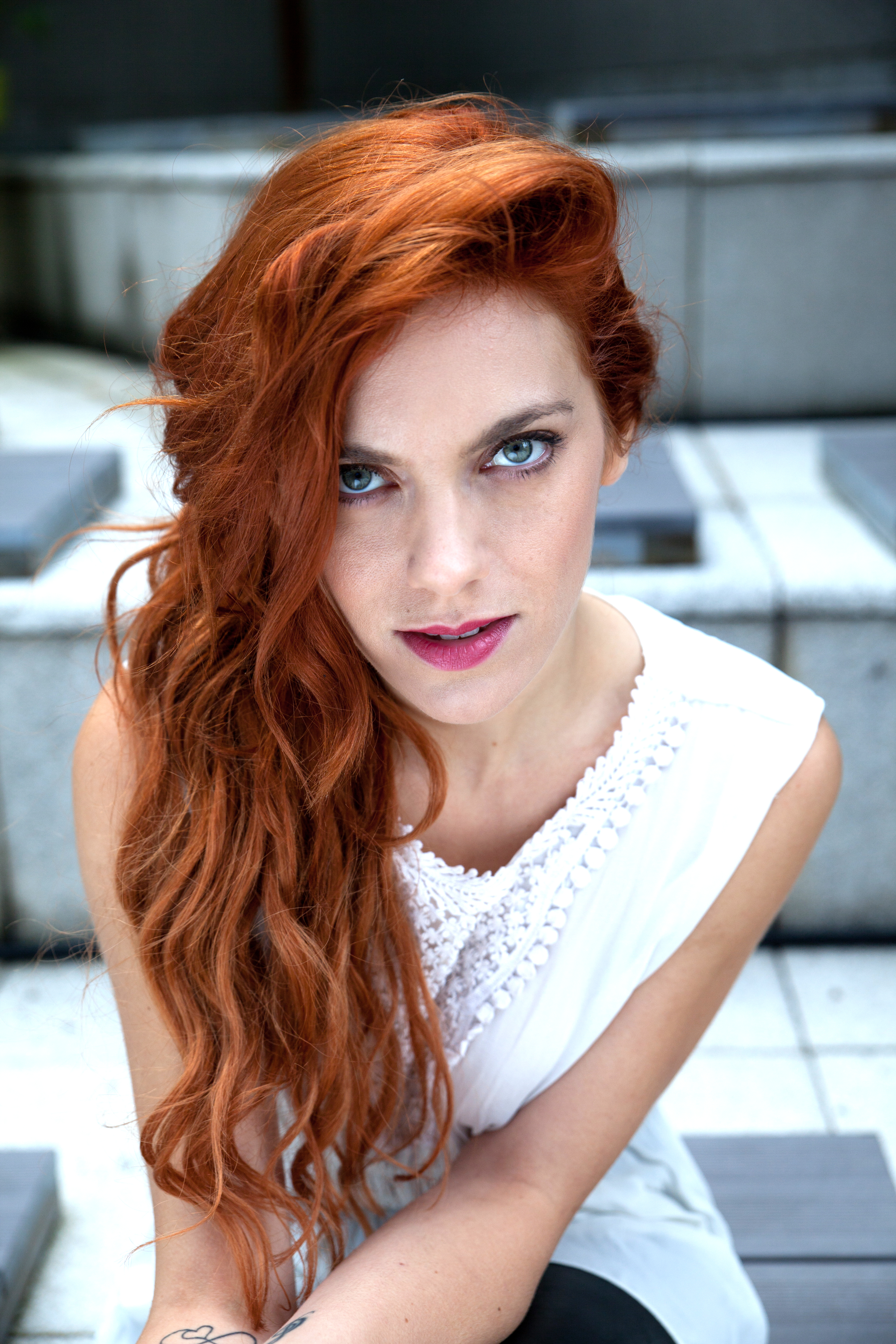
- Delva in 2016

Background information
- Born: 15 May 1986 (age 40); Bar-le-Duc, France
- Genres: Pop
- Occupations: Singer
- Instruments: Vocals
- Years active: 2010–present
- Label: UMG

Anaïs Delva (French: [anais dɛlva]; born 15 May 1986) is a French singer. She is known for providing the voice of Disney's character Elsa, from the animated movie Frozen, in the European French version. She would also voice her in the Canadian French version for the singing parts only.

== Musicals ==
- Roméo et Juliette, les enfants de Vérone (2009–2010)
- Cendrillon, le spectacle musical (2010–2011)
- Dracula, l'amour plus fort que la mort (2010–2012)
- Robin des Bois : la légende… ou presque ! (2012 and 2018)
- Salut les copains (2012–2014)
- Spamalot (2013–2014)
- Kid Manoir (2013–2014)
- Hansel et Gretel (2014)
- Enooormes (2018)

== Discography ==
=== Solo ===
==== Albums ====
- 2015 – Anaïs Delva et les princesses Disney
- 2019 – Obsidienne
- 2019 – Quand J’entends Chanter Noël

==== Singles ====
- 2013 – "Libérée, Délivrée" (from Frozen, French dubbed film)
- 2013 – "Toi"
- 2014 – "Le Petit Sourire" (Stupid/Happy/Pretty)
- 2018 – "Partons"

=== As Maverik ===
==== EPs ====
- 2016 – The Lunatic Bee
