= Bling (film) =

- Theatrical release poster
- Directed by: Kyung Ho Lee; Wonjae Lee
- Screenplay by: Chris Denk; Hyunjoong Kim; Kyung Ho Lee; Saul Blinkoff; Sukhoon Choi; Harry Glennon
- Produced by: Jongsoo Kim; Joshua Sohn
- Starring: Taylor Kitsch; Jennette McCurdy; James Woods; Carla Gugino; Tom Green; Jon Heder; Jason Mewes
- Edited by: Kim Chang-ju
- Music by: Geoff Zanelli
- Production companies: Digiart Productions; Digital Idea; Celsius Entertainment
- Distributed by: Momentum Pictures (United States); Kidari Ent (South Korea)
- Release date: March 3, 2016
- Running time: 82 minutes
- Countries: South Korea; United States
- Language: English
- Budget: $15 million
- Box office: $2.3 million

Bling is a 2016 animated science fiction romantic action comedy film featuring the voices of Taylor Kitsch, Jennette McCurdy, James Woods, Carla Gugino, Tom Green, Jon Heder and Jason Mewes.

The film was made available on Google Play in the United States from March 3 to April 7, 2016, before a limited theatrical release in 10 theaters on May 6, by Momentum Pictures. The film received negative reviews from critics.

== Plot ==
In a future where robots are commonplace, Sam is a lowly theme park mechanic in a robot theme park called RoboWorld in Cosmo City. He is in love with his girlfriend and childhood sweetheart Sue Widdington (who works as a reporter for channel six news) and wants to propose to her in a spectacular way with a bling ring on the upcoming Valentine's Day. He lives with 3 robots he built namely Kit, Okra and Wilmer who all want to be popular superheroes. After buying an expensive engagement ring for Sue, Sam and the trio witness the robbery of another expensive ring by famous supervillain Oscar and his robot henchman Victor. Apparently Oscar is madly in love with the mayor Catherine who is Sue's aunt who doesn't love him. He forces her to accept his proposal in her office but when it doesn't work he escapes with the help of Victor. Sam makes another spectacular plan to propose to Sue during the Valentine's Day parade. Oscar makes plans to force Catherine to accept his proposal by creating a giant robot (that has a head that resembles his) made from smaller robots disguised as ATMs that would destroy the city if she doesn't accept his proposal. He remakes the ring he stole into a remote control for all his robots including Victor. After planting the robots as ATMs in RoboWorld, he and Oscar bump into Sam and Sam mistakes Oscar's ring as his and tries to take it not knowing that his own ring is in his pocket. Victor takes the ring and the two supervillains drive off. Sam and his friends chase after them still convinced that Oscar took Sue's ring.

The chase leads into a dangerous confrontation with Victor and ends with the robot henchman endangering a school bus in a Cloud Road and running off with the ring. Sam and friends save the bus and get praised as heroes. They track Victor to Oscar's lair and steal the ring only for them to face Victor and Oscar's robots in a deadly confrontation. During the fight, Sam's friends realize that the ring belongs to Oscar but decides to help Sam escape so that he could propose to Sue. Sam escapes to propose to sue only to find out the ring is Oscar's. He stops and Sue becomes disappointed in him for not being able to propose and walks off. Dejected, Sam walks off sadly. meanwhile, Victor finds Sam's ring and gives it to Oscar and they both head off to the Valentine's Day parade with an army of robots. En route, Victor discovers that Oscar never really cared about him and only became a villain because of Catherine, so he rebels against him only to be fired and kicked out by Oscar. Feeling betrayed, Victor pledges revenge and meets Sam who gives him Oscar's ring sadly. At the Parade, Catherine is interviewed by Sue and Oscar appears and assembles his giant robot and discovers that the ring given to him by Victor is Sam's. Victor appears and declares he will destroy the city and that he no longer works for Oscar. He ascends into the giant robot and uses Oscar's ring to control it. Sue inspires Sam on TV to save the city and he and his friends rush off to defeat Victor. After a great battle, Sam tells Sue how much he loves her and creates a large plan to defeat Victor and the giant robot. With the help of the robots at RoboWorld and his friends Victor and the giant robot are finally defeated. Oscar is sent to jail but not before he tells Catherine he became a villain to impress her. Catherine who never really liked Sam tells him that he had finally become a great man worthy of Sue. Finally, Sam proposes to Sue with his own handmade ring to which she says yes.

== Voice cast ==
- Taylor Kitsch as Sam O’Malley
  - Zachary Alexander Rice as Young Sam
- Jennette McCurdy as Sue Widdington
  - Eva Bella as Young Sue Widdington
- James Woods as Victor
- Carla Gugino as Catherine
- Tom Green as Okra
- Jon Heder as Wilmer
- Jason Mewes as Kit
- Lynda Greenberg as YouTuber
- Jason Kravits as Oscar
- Jim Breuer as Mr. Glump
- Lex Lang as OX King
- Steve Kramer as Zang
- Dave B. Mitchell as Police, Boxer
- Alicyn Packard as Cancan Robot
- Rena Strober as Computer Voice
- Richard Epcar as Captain Black
- Derek Stephen Prince as Clerk

Minitars voiced by Asher Blinkoff, Meira Blinkoff, and Julian Zane.

Additional voices by Richard Cansino, Geoffrey Cantor, Doug Erholtz, Rick Federman, Rebecca Forstadt, Sandy Fox, Nikki Ghisel, Phil LaMarr, Phil Morris, Ellyn Stern, Kaiji Tang, Ezra Weisz, and Michelle Withfield.

== Crew ==
- Richard Epcar - Voice Director
- Geoff Zanelli - Music
- Donghua Kang - executive producer
- Eondeok Han - Animation director
- Soonho Chang - CG Supervisor
- Kim Chang-ju - Editor

== Reception ==
The film has a 33% rating on Rotten Tomatoes. Grace Montgomery of Common Sense Media awarded the film one star out of five.
