= Disneyland Monorail =

Transit line at the Disneyland Resort

Coordinates: 33.8128°N 117.9167°W

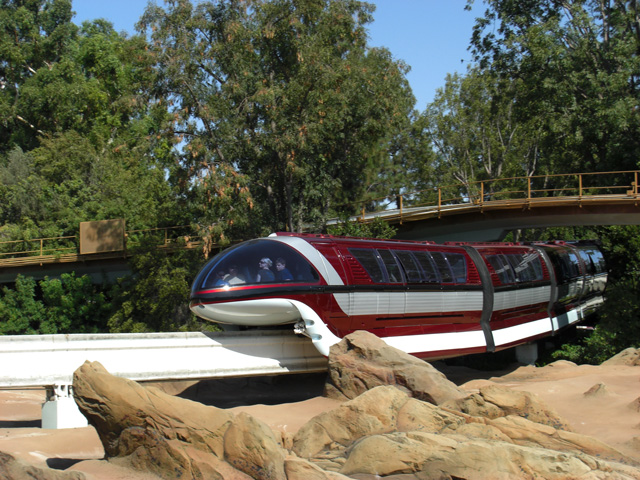
- Mark VII (Mk7) Monorail Red passes over the Finding Nemo Submarine Voyage show building in 2008

Disneyland
- Area: Tomorrowland and Downtown Disney
- Status: Operating
- Opening date: June 14, 1959; 67 years ago

Ride statistics
- Attraction type: Straddle beam monorail
- Designer: WED Enterprises
- Height: 41 ft (12 m)
- Speed: 30 mph (48 km/h)
- Vehicle type: Monorail Trains
- Vehicles: 3
- Riders per vehicle: 120
- Duration: 11 minutes
- Vehicle names: Monorail Red, Monorail Blue, Monorail Orange
- Track gauge: Single straddle-beam
- Wheelchair accessible

The Disneyland Monorail (originally named the Disneyland Alweg Monorail System) is an attraction and transportation line at the Disneyland Resort in Anaheim, California, United States. It was the first daily operating monorail in the country.

== History ==
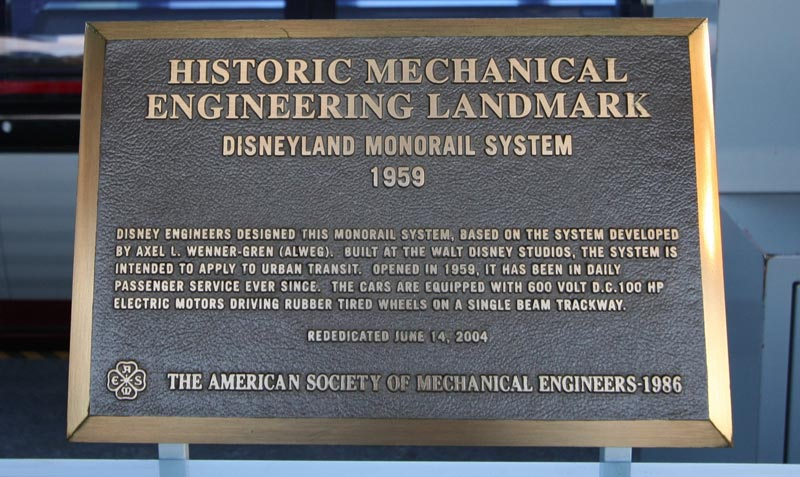
Historical Disneyland Monorail Plaque located at Tomorrowland Station

Walt Disney originally envisioned the monorail as a practical form of public transport for the future. However, the technology never became widespread in the United States beyond a select few novelty installations. The monorail came about during a time when America's—and particularly Los Angeles'—obsession with the automobile was increasing, and monorails in the United States were mostly only located in Disney's theme parks.

The job of building the monorail was originally assigned to the Standard Carriage Works of East Los Angeles, but in late 1958, Walt Disney, pressured for time, moved it to his Burbank studios. Disney designer Bob Gurr then headed a Disney team that designed and manufactured the cars, chassis, suspension and propulsion systems. Gurr and Disney were assisted by Alweg, the German company that pioneered straddle beam monorails.

The Disneyland Alweg Monorail System opened on June 14, 1959, just in time for the re-dedication of Tomorrowland and a broader expansion of Disneyland which included the Matterhorn Bobsleds, the Submarine Voyage, the expanded version of Autopia, and the Motor Boat Cruise. The Mark I trains (Red and Blue) consisted of three cars each. The opening ceremony was attended by then-Vice President Richard Nixon and his family.

=== Expansion ===
At opening, the monorail was merely an attraction, taking people on a scenic trip around Disneyland before returning to its only station. In 1961 it became a true transportation system when the track was extended 2 1/2 miles outside the park to a second station near the Disneyland Hotel. As part of this project, the Tomorrowland station was lengthened to accommodate four-car Mark II trains and a third Yellow train was added.

From Hotel Station there were two trips above Disneyland available aboard the monorail—a quick tour and general admission. Guests wishing to embark upon a vista-dome view of the park, including a leisurely layover in Tomorrowland within the tail-cone could purchase an exclusive round-trip tour ticket at Hotel Station and save the expense of general admission to Disneyland. Nose and tail-cone door latches were independent of the main door release button. A simple dial indicator above the tail-cone compartment door could be turned to one of three positions—General admission guests, round-trip only guests, and mixed. Cast members at Tomorrowland Station would check the dial position and open the door for general admission guests, who could proceed into the park, while ensuring that round-trip guests, who did not have full park tickets, remained aboard. If guests already in the park boarded one of these sections in Tomorrowland, the dial would be set to mixed, then all mixed tail-cone guests disembarked at the hotel.

Both platforms were lengthened in 1968 for the new five-car Mark III trains, which added a fourth Green train.

=== Mark V (Mk5) trains ===
By the early 1980s, the Mark III trains were showing their age and the wear of years. In 1985, Disneyland began phasing out the Mark III trains one by one. The older trains were stripped to the chassis and rebuilt as Mark V trains. The Mark III Green went first, to become the Mark V Purple followed by the Mark III Yellow becoming the Mark V Orange. The Mark III Blue remained blue (albeit a lighter shade) and the last was Red, remaining Red. The notable difference was the loss of the bubble-top driver's area in favor of a streamlined "Learjet" look similar to the Mark IV trains at the Walt Disney World Resort. The new trains also sported closed passenger compartments (with windows that could be opened) and pneumatic doors. Following the 1985 Disney World monorail fire, a safety handrail was added along the top of the train, as well as emergency fire exit hatches leading to the roof. The attraction's name remained the "Disneyland Monorail System", as it had been painted on the Mark III trains' skirts. The Mark V trains were built by Ride & Show Engineering, Inc., incorporating bodies that were produced by Messerschmitt-Bolkow-Blohm of Germany (now Airbus). Purple first made its appearance for testing in Autumn of 1986 and began regular operations a few months later. Orange was delivered in late Summer of 1987, followed by Blue in early 1988. The oldest train, Red, was also the last to be removed from the line for refurbishment in early 1988.

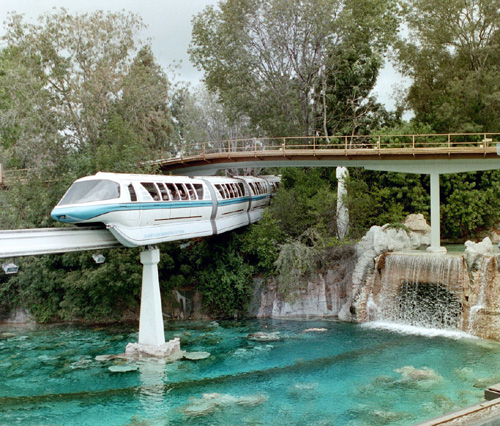
Mark V Monorail Blue travels over the former Submarine Voyage in 2002

The beamway path was re-aligned into the Eeyore section of the parking lot in 1994 to accommodate the construction of the Indiana Jones Adventure show building. The trains were fitted with new electrical pick-up shoes and tail view cameras, enabling two-train point-to-point shuttle service where the first arriving train was disembarked, moved along empty to just beyond the station, the second train arrived, disembarked, embarked and dispatched so the first train could be loaded and dispatched for the return. In 1999, the monorail began lengthy periods of closures due to construction of the Disney California Adventure theme park where the monorail beamway passed through what had formerly been the parking lot. Although the beamway's route was not altered, a significant amount of construction was done around the existing beamway, and much of the terrain under the beamway's support columns were regraded, necessitating the closures. Additionally, the Disneyland Hotel Station and all of its nearby hotel structures were completely demolished and a new station built in the same location. Downtown Disney Station is treated as a second gate into Disneyland Park, so a general admission passport or valid annual pass must be presented to ride the monorail and the tail-cone tour is no longer offered.

The system resumed limited shuttle operations in 2000 when the Downtown Disney Station became operational, but a significant portion of the beamway was still unusable due to construction. In 2001 the monorail resumed full capacity forward direction circuit operations, passing through Disney's Grand Californian Hotel & Spa, as well as showcasing the new park.

In 2004, Monorail Orange was removed from the line and taken to Walt Disney Imagineering in Glendale to be reverse engineered. Monorail Blue was removed in September 2006 for rebuilding. The Finding Nemo Submarine Voyage show building was extended into the lagoon beneath the monorail, which closed from August 21 through December 14, 2006 to prepare for the 2007 opening of Finding Nemo Submarine Voyage.

=== Mark VII (Mk7) monorail ===
Like the Mark III to Mark V conversion, the refurbishment from Mark V to Mark VII was done one train at a time. The entire Mark VII Monorail fleet consists of three trains—Red, Blue, and Orange. The first Mark VII train, Monorail Red, arrived at Disneyland on December 20, 2007. It was originally expected to be in service by the end of February 2008, but due to design change issues, it did not begin serving park guests until July 3, 2008. Mark VII Blue arrived on-site on April 10, 2008, began daytime riderless testing on August 1, 2008, and began guest service on September 16, 2008. Monorail Mark VII Orange arrived on-site on August 14, 2008, began riderless testing in March 2009 and began guest service on April 7, 2009.

== Operations ==
The Disneyland Monorail has two stations: one in Tomorrowland, and another in the Downtown Disney District. The original Monorail was a round trip ride with no stops. In 1961, the track was expanded to connect to a station at the Disneyland Hotel, making it an actual transportation system. The original Hotel station was torn down in 1999 and a new station, now called the Downtown Disney Station, was built in the same place. All riders must disembark at Tomorrowland Station, and during peak traffic periods, the monorail offers only one-way trips where all passengers must also disembark at the Downtown Disney Station and re-board for the return trip to Tomorrowland. Admission to Disneyland Park must be purchased to ride the monorail.

In the fall of 2006, the Tomorrowland Station was remodeled due to the Finding Nemo Submarine Voyage construction. The original speed ramps were removed, and a new concrete ramp was added on the east end of the station to handle the queue and access to the station, with concrete stairs on the west end to handle the exiting Monorail passengers.

The monorail travels in one direction only. All passengers board at a single platform. Leaving Tomorrowland station, the monorail crosses the Disneyland Railroad and continues along Harbor Boulevard on the eastern edge of the park. Turning to enter Disney California Adventure, it passes Monsters, Inc. Mike & Sulley to the Rescue! and the Sunset Showcase Theater. The track then crosses through the gateway to the Disney California Adventure park. Passengers can see Disneyland Park on the right and Disney California Adventure on the left. The monorail then passes through Disney's Grand Californian Hotel & Spa then makes a sharp curve to the right and enters the Downtown Disney station, which has a vegetative theme to match the floral motif throughout the shopping district.

Downtown Disney station has one platform. After a five-minute loading, the train leaves Downtown Disney and makes a short loop around the district before crossing above the esplanade between the two parks and heads back to Disneyland. Once inside the park, the monorail crosses the railroad again and goes into a series of sharp bends and curves around Tomorrowland. The track travels above the Submarine Lagoon and Autopia. The track crosses the lagoon four times. The track then curves around the Matterhorn Bobsleds, giving a view of Fantasyland, then turns left to reenter the Tomorrowland Station.

=== Horn ===
All monorail trains are equipped with Grover 1056 2-chime air horns. The horn must be sounded twice when departing a station, at one point where the track parallels the currently unused PeopleMover/Rocket Rod track, and when approaching the Matterhorn. They are also sounded when a bird lands on the track, and as a greeting to passing Disneyland Railroad trains near the switch to the barn. The original trains were equipped with real ground-level train-sounding horns.

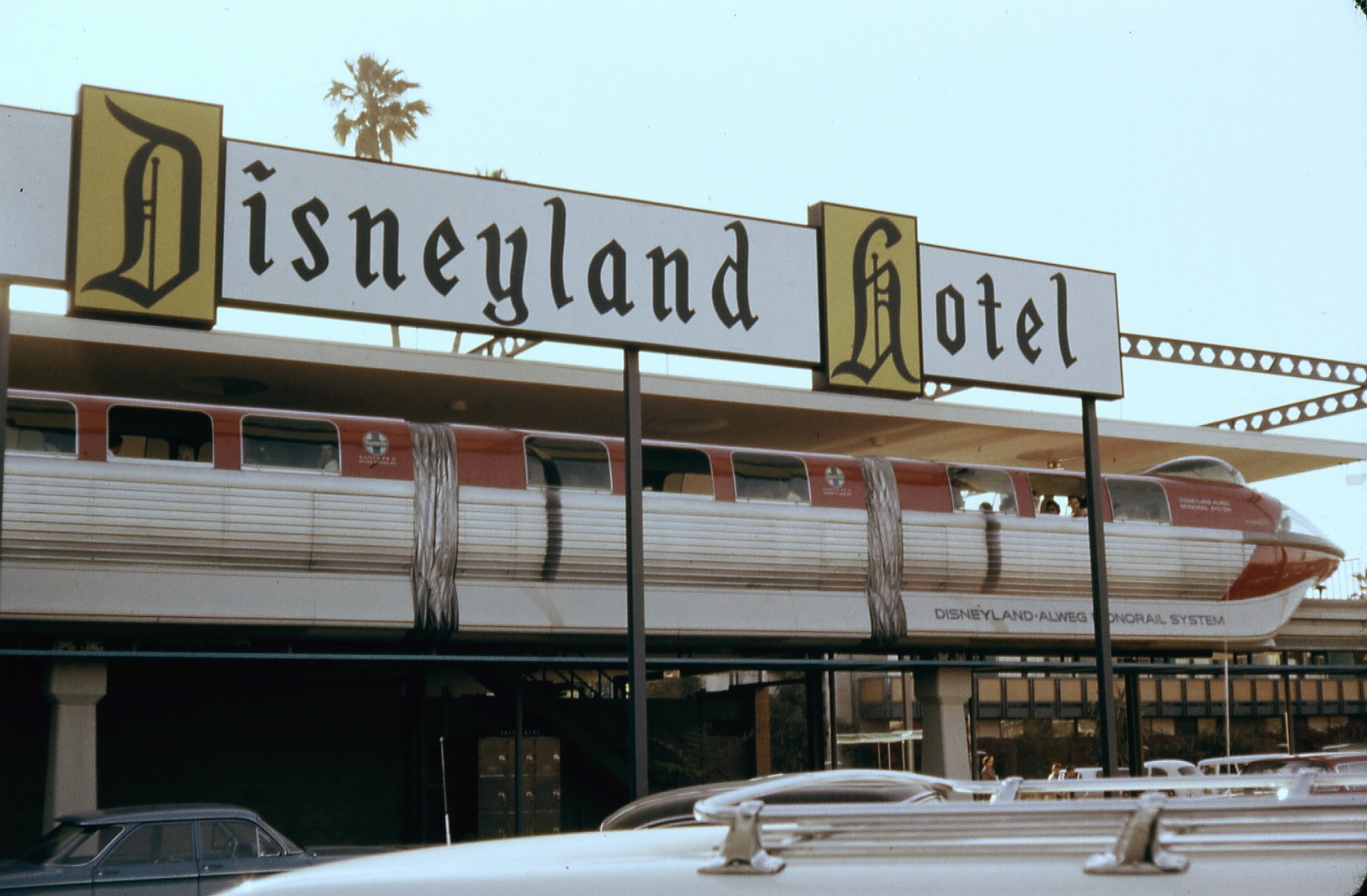
The original red Mark I ALWEG Monorail train, with one car added, then designated Mark II. Both trains were specially created for Disneyland. The other train was blue but otherwise identical. Seen at the Disneyland Hotel station in August 1963.

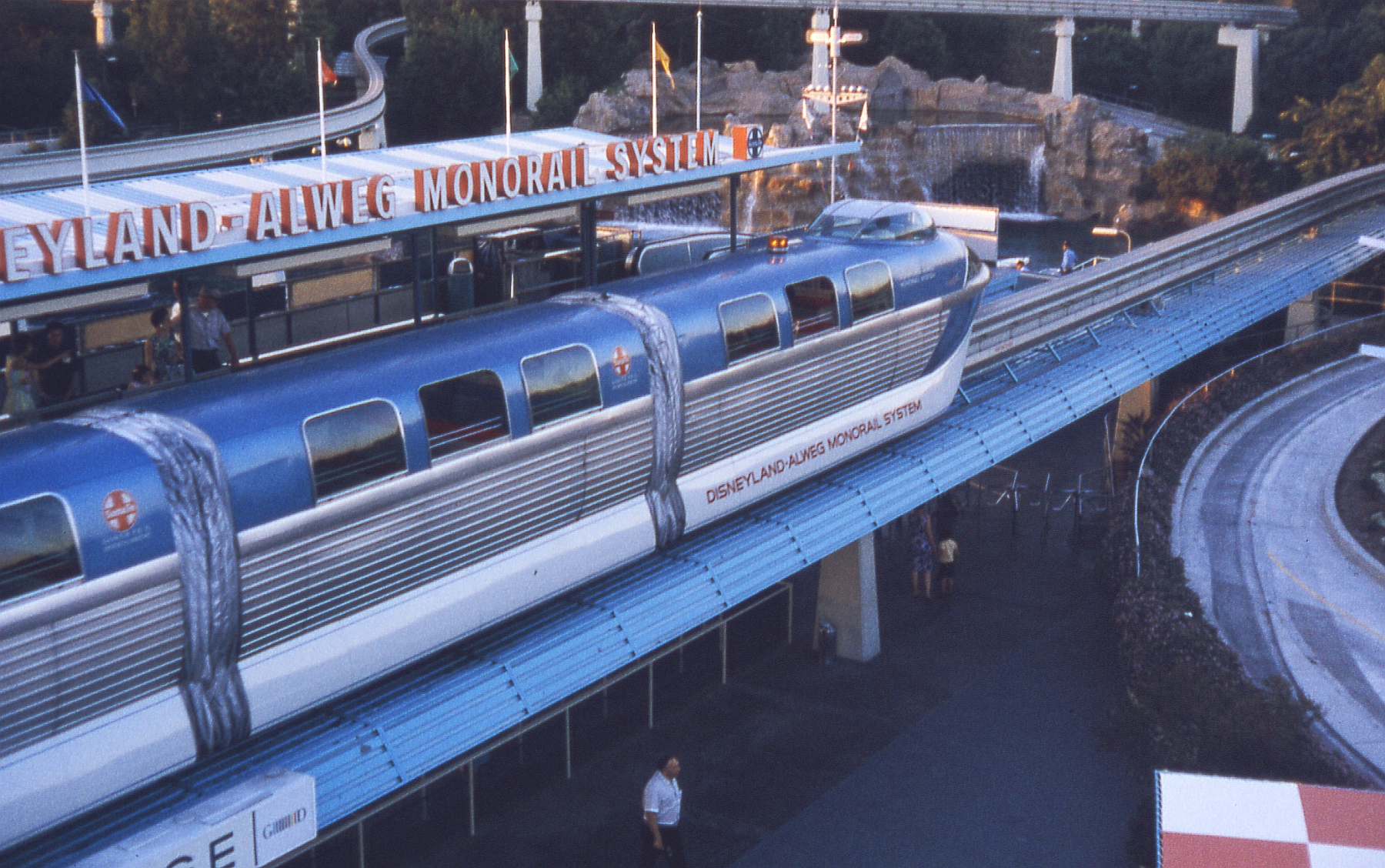
The blue Mark II ALWEG Monorail train. Seen at the Disneyland Park station in August 1963.

== Maintenance ==
"Monorail Shop", as it is officially known ("Shop" for short), is Disney's monorail maintenance facility located behind "it's a small world" and I-5 Freeway entrance to Harbor Blvd. at Disneyland and provides space for four monorails on its upper level (the bottom level houses the five steam locomotives that circle Disneyland). Monorails access this yard by stopping at the switch near the road crossing and then the switch will switch to the facility spur. Then the monorail travels slowly into the yard where another switch leads it into the designated track. No train will ever be left outside the facility because routine maintenance is performed nightly.

=== Tractor ===
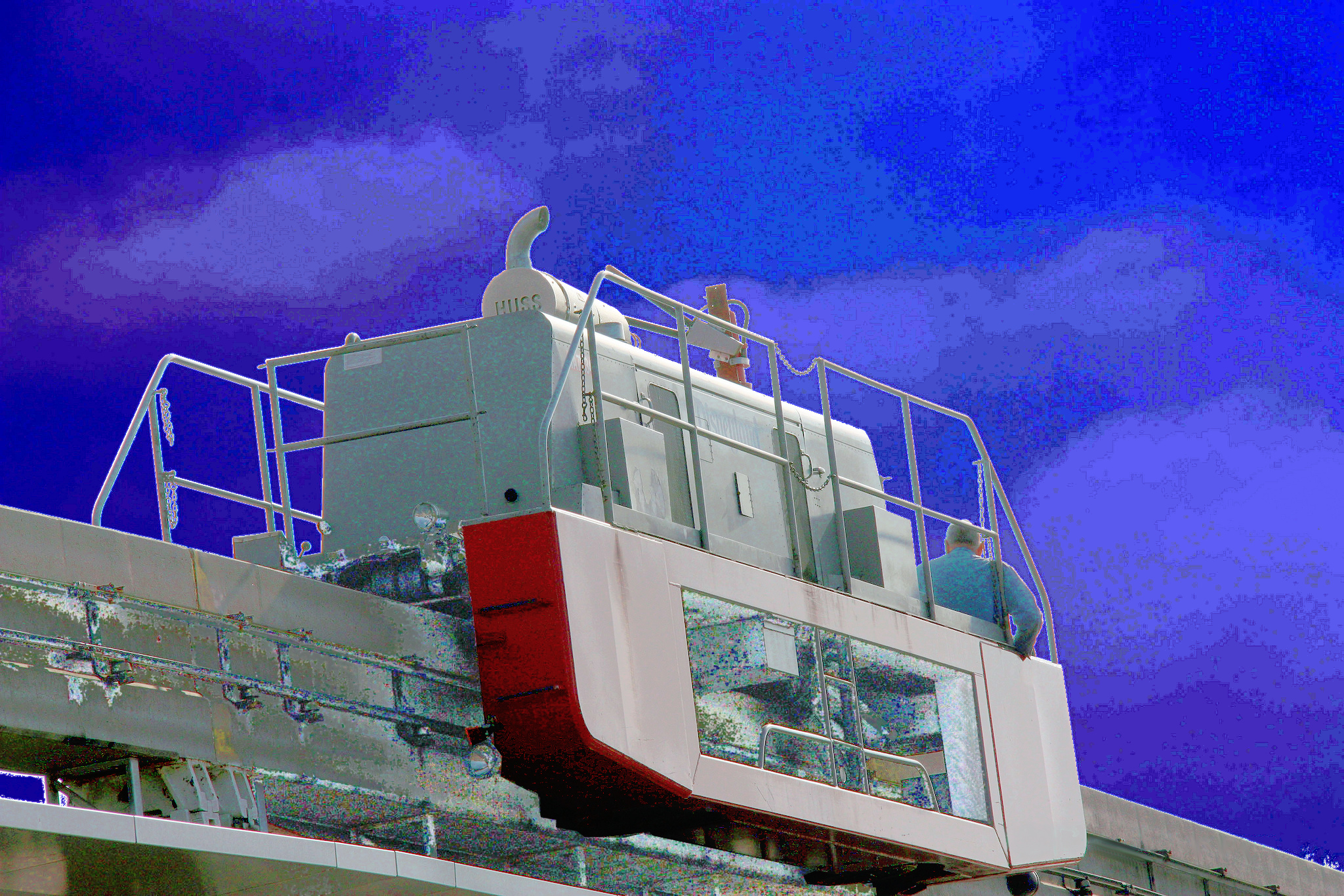
Maintenance-of-way Tractor

The diesel/hydraulic powered "work tractors" are primarily used each morning for beam inspection and maintenance-of-way which includes trimming vegetation beyond the reach of guests, cleaning and repairing the electrical commutator rails as well as periodically scheduled servicing and painting of the concrete beam guideway. They are powerful enough to return a fully loaded train fitted with tow-bars to a station platform, then to the Monorail Shop, independent of 600 V track power.

=== Installation and removal ===
In order to remove old monorail trains and replace them with new ones, they are shunted to maintenance shop beam "D" where each car segment is prepared individually for removal by supporting the remaining segment and disconnecting the bellows, cables, and articulated motor truck. The car is then rolled outside along the beam to a position where a custom crane-hoist harness is fitted to it and the car is hoisted off the beam and transferred to a truck trailer on which a transport beam is bolted. The Diesel/hydraulic tractor (pictured) is used as a switcher to carefully tow each car into and out of the maintenance shop. The procedure is reversed for fitting new segments of monorail train cars to the beam while testing each system and connection. Each fully assembled train is then slowly and methodically tested thoroughly over many months before it can be placed into revenue service for guests. It was determined after delivery of Mark VII Monorail Red that platform clearance was too tight for the new, elongated end-compartments, so Monorail Blue was modified at the manufacturer and entered service before Red. .

== Safety ==
=== Emergency evacuation ===
Emergencies requiring train evacuation will be handled differently depending upon the location of the train and the nature of the emergency.

If a train is stopped at a station platform or the work platform, guests can exit the train onto the platform. Exiting a train is possible even when the doors of the train cars are closed. A cast member outside the car can also forcibly open the rightmost door panel of the car by releasing the air pressure holding that panel closed. The air pressure release is a handle beneath the rectangular center window that is similar in appearance to a car door handle.

If a train is stopped on an open beam, then guests evacuate through emergency exits located in the roof of the train. Guests open roof hatches by first removing decorative plastic from the ceiling above a bulkhead footstool and then by lifting open a hinged hatch that will flip across the bulkhead dividing two train cars. Guests evacuate to the roof by climbing through the open hatch onto the top of the train. The bulkheads separating cars are designed as firewalls that will contain a fire within a car to just that car. The open hatch allows guests in the affected car to transfer to an adjacent car where they can safely wait for evacuation by fire response crews.

If the emergency affects the entire train, then guests are evacuated to the surface of the beam. Guests again open the emergency roof hatches but do not simply move to the adjacent car. Instead, they use a small handrail present along the top of each train car to move to the front of the train. The Disneyland Fire Department assists in the safe evacuation of the disabled train.

=== Platform safety ===
Platform gates are operated manually and remain closed until the next train arrives and cast members determine that it is safe to board.

The trains are powered by 600 V DC electric current, drawn from a small contact rail (bus bar) running along the right side of the beam. This bus bar is similar to the electrified or "third" rail of a subway train.

== Facts and figures ==
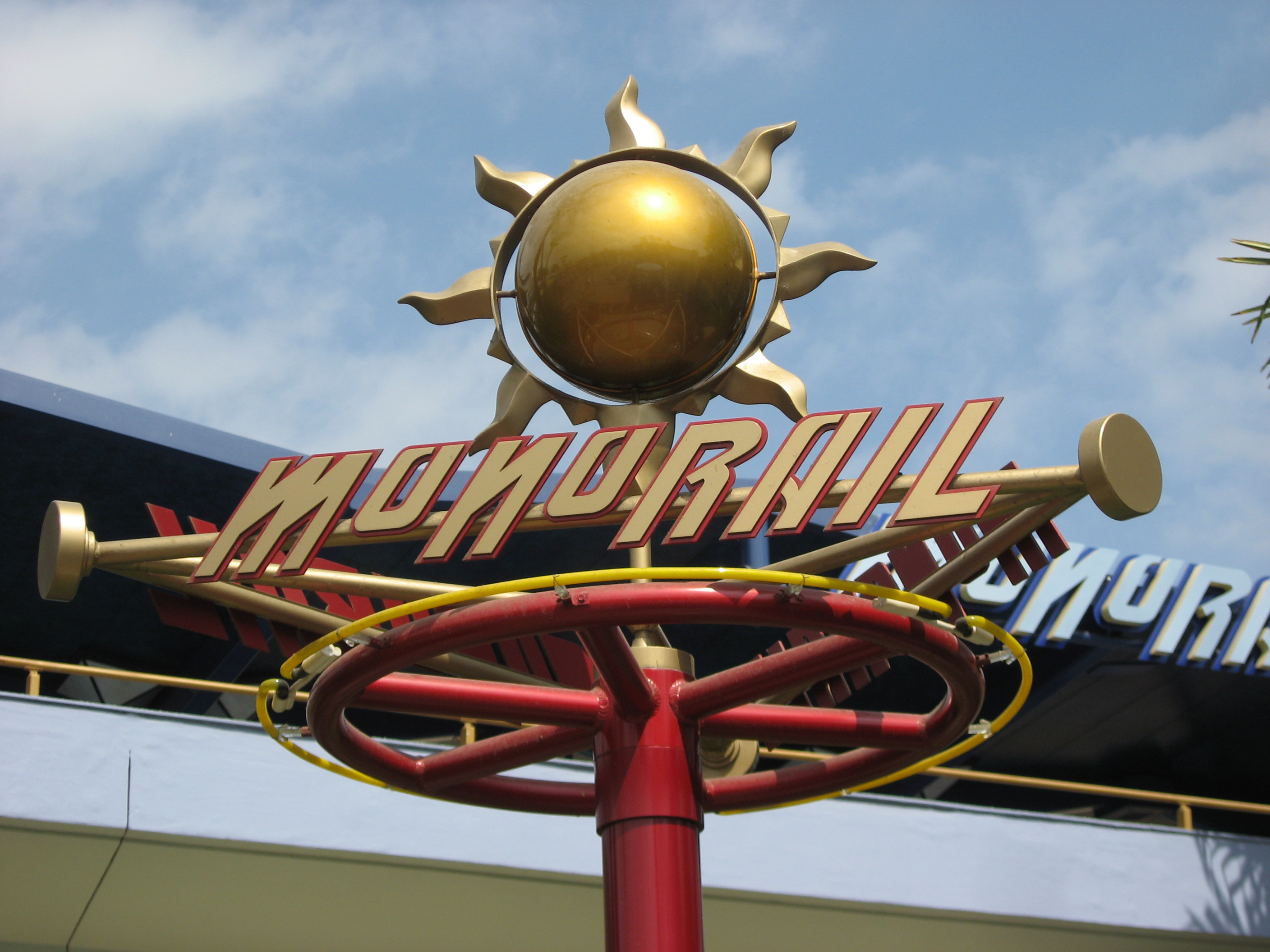
Monorail sign in Tomorrowland

- Grand opening: June 14, 1959
- Designer: WED Enterprises
- Trains: 3 - Mark VII Red, Mark VII Blue and Mark VII Orange
- Beamway length: 12,300 feet (2.33 miles; 3.7 kilometers)
- Round trip duration: 13 minutes
- Coupon required (originally): "E" (the coupon system has since been replaced with passports which include all attractions.)
- Ride system: Each train has 10 nitrogen-filled truck tires, one on either end of each car, that ride on top of the beamway and carry the load of the train. Four of the tires are powered with 100 horsepower (75 kW), 600 V DC electric motors. Each train has 40 smaller guide tires that run along the side of the beam along with 4 steering tires, 2 under each cab to help steer the lead tire up to 3 degrees in either direction. For all other tires, steering is determined by the relative geometry of the adjacent cars.
- 1959 construction costs of the entire system averaged over $1 million per mile (>$620,000/kilometer).
- Oversized ceremonial scissors failed to cut the ribbon during the televised opening ceremony, so Walt simply tore it.
- At one point, ATSF stickers were seen on various monorails through 1960, but were removed after the sponsorship ended.

== Disneyland Monorail trains ==
View from monorail car facing southeast on South Harbor Blvd

- Mark I: 1959–1961
  - Built at Disney Studios. Based on Alweg monorail systems and concepts.
  - 3-car trains
  - Colors: red and blue
- Mark II: 1961–1969
  - Built at Disney Studios. Based on Alweg monorail systems and concepts.
  - Same physical hardware as Mark I, with minor upgrades and improvements
  - 4-car trains (1 new car for red and blue trains, yellow was a new train)
  - Bigger dome on top of front car
  - Colors: red, blue and yellow
- Mark III: 1969–1987
  - Built by Walt Disney Imagineering/WED Enterprises through WED Transportation Systems
  - Entirely new design and physical hardware. No re-use from Mark I & II.
  - 5-car trains
  - 137 feet (41.76 m) long
  - Colors: red, blue, yellow and green
- Mark V: 1987–2008
  - 5-car trains
  - Designed by Walt Disney Imagineering
  - Car bodies built by Messerschmitt-Bölkow-Blohm of Germany
  - Seats 24 passengers in each of the five cars, plus 7 passengers in the tail cone, and 5 passengers with 1 driver in the nose cone.
  - Total number of passengers per train: 132
  - Utilizes Mk III chassis as re-engineered by Ride & Show Engineering, Inc. of San Dimas, California.
  - The Mk V was designed to resemble the appearance of the Mark IV series monorails which were operating in the Walt Disney World Resort.
  - Colors: red, blue, orange and purple

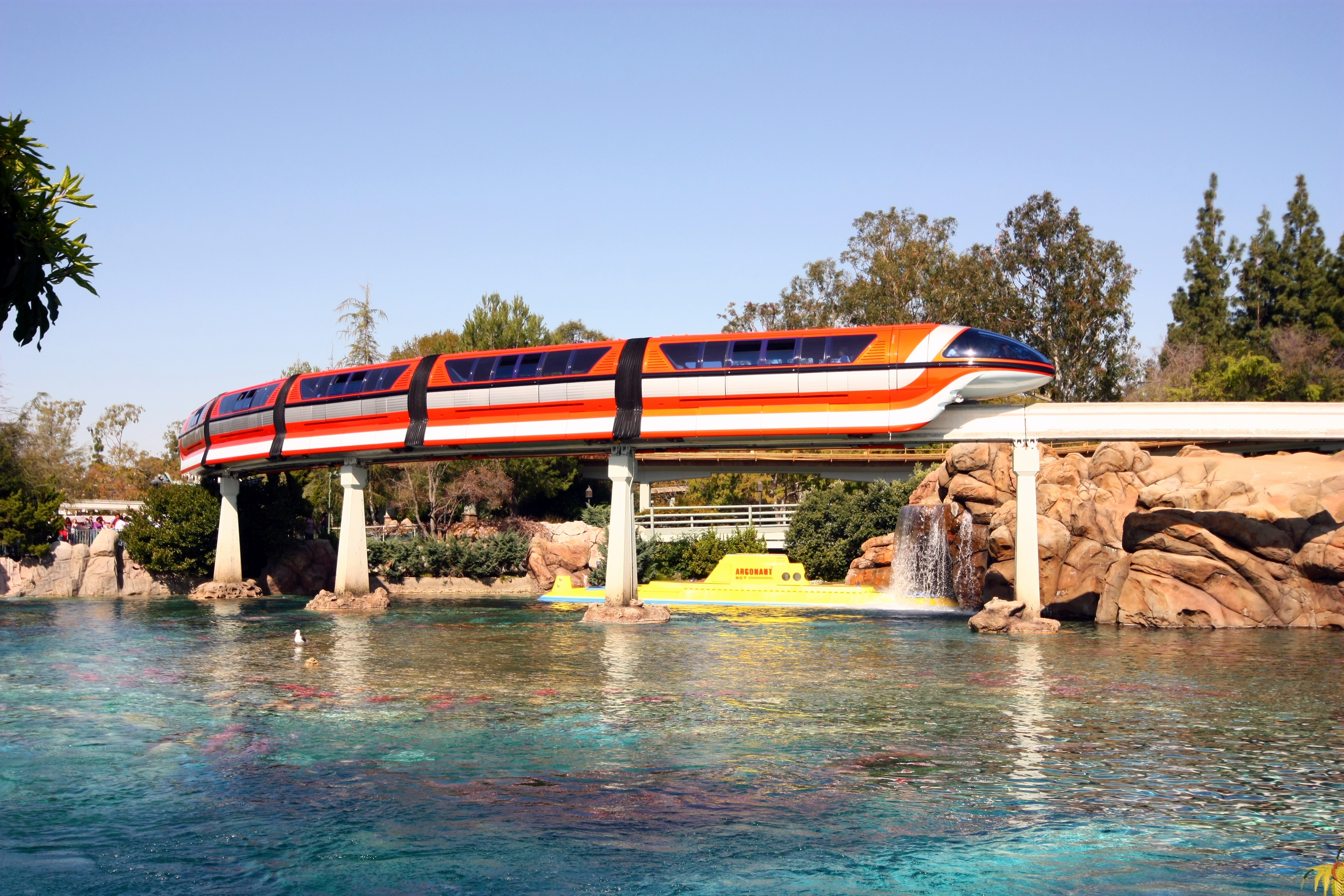
Monorail Orange, a Mark VII (Mk7) monorail, passes over the lagoon in Tomorrowland at Disneyland.

- Mark VII (Mk7): 2008–present
  - Sleek/Retro design accomplished by installing a Mark III style nose on the existing Mark V trains.
  - New island seating configuration, with one row of inward-facing seating at the front and rear ends of each car.
  - The main cabins have a capacity of 22 passengers
  - The tailcone has a capacity of six passengers while the nosecone has a capacity of four passengers and a pilot.
  - Total number of passengers per train: 120
  - Designed and engineered in-house by Walt Disney Imagineering and TPI Composites
  - Built by Dynamic Structures
  - Colors: Red, Blue, and Orange.
  - The first Mark VII (Mk7) monorail, Red, was delivered to Disneyland on December 20, 2007. It began service on July 3, 2008.
  - The second Mark VII (Mk7), Blue, was delivered to Disneyland on April 10, 2008. It began service September 16, 2008.
  - The Third Mark VII (Mk7), Orange, was delivered to Disneyland on August 14, 2008. It began service on April 7, 2009.

== See also ==
- Disney Resort Line (monorail system at Tokyo Disney Resort)
- List of incidents at Disneyland Resort
- List of Disneyland attractions
- List of monorail systems
- Rail transport in Walt Disney Parks and Resorts
- Walt Disney World Monorail System
