= Maelstrom (ride) =

Former reversing log flume dark ride

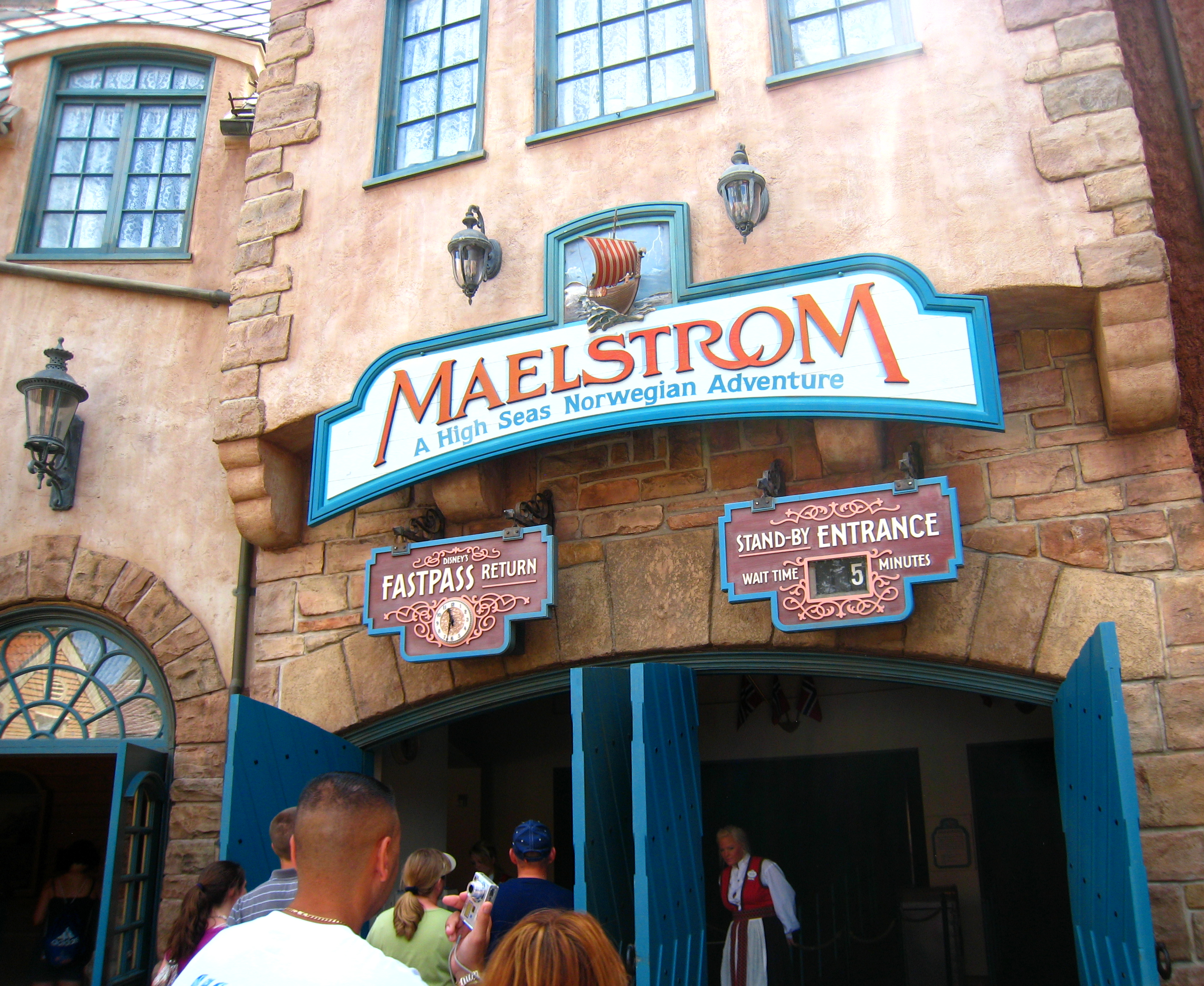
- Entrance of the ride

Epcot
- Area: World Showcase, Norway pavilion
- Coordinates: 28°22′15″N 81°32′47″W
- Status: Removed
- Opening date: July 5, 1988
- Closing date: October 5, 2014
- Replaced by: Frozen Ever After

Ride statistics
- Attraction type: Musical boat cruise/shoot the chute
- Manufacturer: Intamin
- Designer: Walt Disney Imagineering
- Theme: History of mythological Norway
- Drop: 28 ft (8.5 m)
- Length: 964 ft (294 m)
- Capacity: 1000 riders per hour
- Vehicle type: Viking boat
- Vehicles: Viking boat
- Riders per vehicle: 16
- Rows: 4
- Riders per row: 4
- Duration: 4:27
- Lift count: 1
- Movie length: 5:52 minutes
- Number of drops: 1
- FastPass+ was available
- Assistive listening available

Maelstrom was a reversing shoot the chute dark ride attraction located in the Epcot theme park at Walt Disney World Resort in Florida. Designed by Walt Disney Imagineering, the ride opened on July 5, 1988, in the Norway Pavilion of the park's World Showcase section. It was a mix between a log chute and a traditional film attraction. Visitors rode boats patterned after longships that passed through various scenes that featured Audio-Animatronics figures. The attraction was originally going to be called SeaVenture, with the entrance sign during construction displaying it as such. Sometime between March 1988 and the ride's opening, it was changed.

In September 2014, it was announced that the ride would be replaced by an attraction based on Disney Animation's 2013 film Frozen. Maelstrom's final day of operation was October 5, 2014. Frozen Ever After opened on June 21, 2016.

== Ride experience ==
Riders departed from a dock traveling by boat, which turned a corner into a dark tunnel and up the flume's lift hill. A voice tells riders that "those who seek the spirit of Norway face peril and adventure, but more often find beauty and charm." Arriving at the top of the hill, a lit face of the Germanic and Norse god Odin hovered above. Riders passed through scenes of seafarers and maritime villages depicting a mythological version of Norway's Viking days. Entering a marsh, the boat would come face to face with audio-animatronic depictions of a Nokken and a three-headed troll. The trolls, angered by the trespassing boat, cast a spell onto riders as the vehicle began to move backward rapidly, accelerated by hidden conveyor belts underneath the water's surface. The boats floated briskly past scenes of Atlantic puffins, polar bears and living trees, before coming to a stop on the edge of another waterfall, exposing the Norway pavilion's main thoroughfare. The backwards edge of the boat peeked out through the facade as the track pivoted to let the vehicle travel forward again. Correctly oriented, the boats plunged forward down a 28-foot (8.5 m) flume into a stormy depiction of the North Sea. After passing very close to an oil rig, the ride came to an abrupt end in a calm harbor of a small village, where the narrator announced, "Norway's spirit has always been, and will always be adventure." As guests exited the ride, they had the option of watching a 5-minute 70mm tourism film, "The Spirit of Norway", which highlighted various attractions in Norway including skiing, hiking, and Kjerag mountain.

Hidden Mickeys on the ride included:

- In the ride's loading area, a large painted mural included many people and elements from Norway's history. Hidden in this painting was a Viking whose helmet had Mickey Mouse ears, and another figure wearing a Mickey Mouse watch.
- Inside the stave church, King Olaf II had a small Mickey embroidered on his tunic, near his right thigh.

== See also ==
- List of Epcot attractions
