= Norway Pavilion at Epcot =

Pavilion of World Showcase in Epcot

Norway Pavilion
- Pavilion wordmark used until 2019

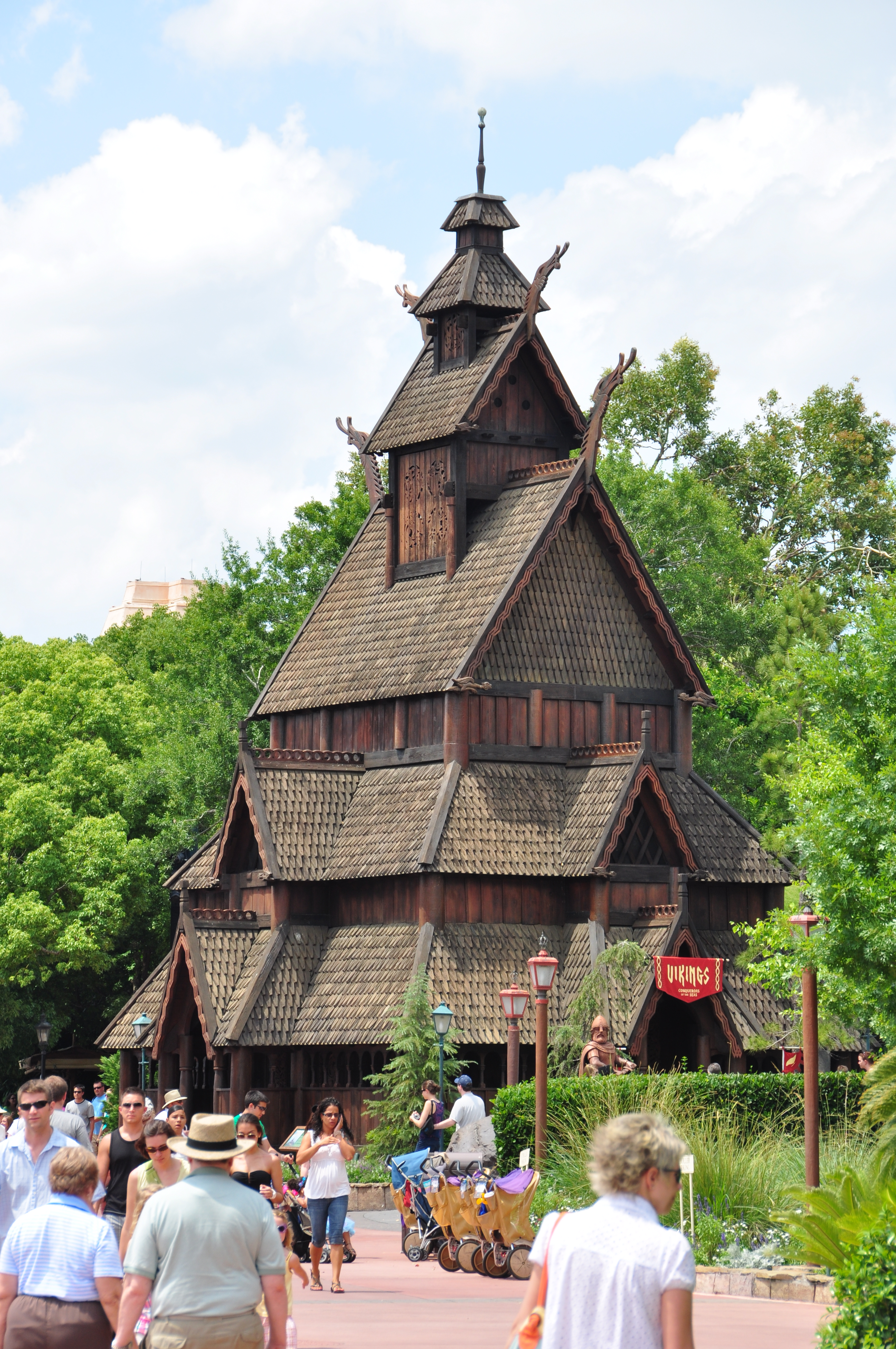
- Stave church replica located at the Norway pavilion

Epcot
- Area: World Showcase
- Coordinates: 28°22′14″N 81°32′47″W
- Status: Operating
- Soft opening date: May 6, 1988
- Opening date: June 3, 1988

Ride statistics
- Attraction type: Themed Pavilion
- Theme: Norwegian Village

The Norway Pavilion is a Norwegian-themed pavilion that is part of the World Showcase, within Epcot at Walt Disney World in Bay Lake, Florida, United States. Its location is between the Mexico and China pavilions.

== Layout ==
The 58,000-square-foot (5,400 m^{2}) Norway Pavilion is designed to look like a Norwegian village. The village includes a detailed reproduction Stave church, with a statue of Olaf II Haraldsson out front, and the exterior of its main table-service restaurant, Restaurant Akershus, resembles its namesake in Oslo. The exhibit showcases 4 styles of Norwegian architecture: Setesdal-style, Bergen-style, Oslo-style and Ålesund-style.

Much of the pavilion is taken up by interconnected shops. These shops are decorated with large wooden trolls and sell assorted Norwegian goods, including clothing, candy, and statuettes of Norse gods and trolls. The courtyard of the pavilion contains the entrance to Frozen Ever After. Kringla Bakeri og Kafé is a bakery, featuring assorted Norwegian pastries, such as cream horns and open-faced salmon sandwiches. The courtyard contains the entrance to Restaurant Akershus, featuring a hot and cold buffet and "Princess Storybook Dining."

One former exhibit was a full-scale Viking ship, inspired by the famous Oseberg ship. Formerly a children's play area, the structure was removed in December 2008.

== History ==
The Norway Pavilion is the most recent nation to be added to World Showcase. It soft-opened on May 6, 1988, but the grand opening did not occur until a month later, when Crown Prince Harald of Norway (who later became King Harald V of Norway) dedicated the pavilion in a ceremony that was broadcast live to Norway. The original idea was to create a Nordic Pavilion that would combine elements from various countries into one exhibit. Three countries were consulted, but it finally ended up with investors from Norway raising the US$30 million required to create an exclusive national pavilion. Disney contributed the other one-third of the construction cost. In 1992, the investors sold their stake to Disney. Since nearly as many people visit Epcot as live in Norway, the government felt it still was a good promotional tool for their tourism industry. The federal government continued to contribute US$200,000 annually for five years to help fund the exhibit. Renewed in 1997 for a further 5 years, the government stopped payments in 2002, against the recommendations from their American embassy.

In September 2014, Disney officials announced that the Maelstrom attraction would be closed and renovated into a new attraction based upon the company's hit computer-animated musical film, Frozen. Frozen Ever After, which opened in 2016, features the same ride vehicles and basic course of the original attraction, but with scenes inspired by the film and the Frozen Fever animated short. Due to the popularity and immediate fan base Frozen drew, plans to add the "Frozen Ever After" attraction to the Norway pavilion were set with a very short construction time, this is a major reason why the attraction will so closely resemble the "Maelstrom" attraction previously in its place. The addition of "Frozen Ever After" is intended to bring more attention to Epcot, as well as the Scandinavian culture represented throughout the Norway pavilion.

On October 5, 2025, following the announcement, Walt Disney World announced that the attraction in the Norway Pavilion at EPCOT will receive upgrades, including the audio-animatronic figures, using updated technology currently in use on the newer World of Frozen attraction at Hong Kong Disneyland, when the upgrades could be completed on February 12, 2026.

== Attractions and services ==
Attractions:

- Frozen Ever After (2016-present)
- Anna & Elsa's Royal Sommerhus (2016 - present)
- EPCOT World Showcase Adventure
  - DuckTales World Showcase Adventure (2022 - present)

Former Attractions:

- Maelstrom (1988 - 2014)
- EPCOT World Showcase Adventure
  - Kim Possible World Showcase Adventure (2009 - 2012)
  - Agent P World Showcase Adventure (2012 - 2020)

Dining:

- Kringla Bakeri og Kafe
- Akershus Royal Banquet Hall (Disney Princess Character Dining)

Shopping:

- The Fjording

Exhibitions:

- Stave Church Gallery houses an exhibit on Norwegian culture and Norse mythology, which became part of Gods of the Vikings.

== See also ==
- Epcot attraction and entertainment history
