= Family Business (Once Upon a Time) =

- Once Upon a Time episode
- Episode no.: Season 4 Episode 6
- Directed by: Mario Van Peebles
- Written by: Kalinda Vazquez & Andrew Chambliss
- Production code: 406
- Original air date: November 2, 2014

Guest appearances
- Georgina Haig as Elsa; Elizabeth Lail as Anna; Elizabeth Mitchell as Snow Queen/Ingrid; Scott Michael Foster as Kristoff Bjorgman; Frances O'Connor as Colette; John Rhys-Davies as Grand Pabbie (Voice); Christie Laing as Marian (Credit only); Sean Maguire as Robin Hood; Darcey Johnson as Oaken; Eric Keenleyside as Sir Maurice; Garfield Wilson as a Palace Guard

Episode chronology
| ← Previous "Breaking Glass" | Next → "The Snow Queen" |
- Once Upon a Time season 4

"Family Business" is the sixth episode of the fourth season of the American fantasy drama series Once Upon a Time, which aired on November 2, 2014.

In this episode, Belle tries to find out what the Snow Queen wants, while flashbacks show Belle's past with Anna.

== Title card ==
An ice cream van drives through the forest.

== Plot ==
=== Event chronology ===
The Enchanted Forest events take place after "Her Handsome Hero", "Rocky Road" and "The Apprentice", before "Smash the Mirror", and shortly before "Skin Deep". The Arendelle events take place after "The Apprentice" and before "Smash the Mirror". The Storybrooke events take place after "Breaking Glass".

=== In the Characters' Past ===
In the Enchanted Forest, during the time of the ogre wars before the first curse was cast, a woman named Colette tells her daughter to hurry up so they can escape. The daughter is Belle, who was trying to retrieve her book, but as they attempt to flee, it is too late, as they are forced to hide under a table in their library. Unfortunately, an ogre finds them and attacks. The event turns out to be a nightmare for Belle, who wakes up and asks her father about what happened as she cannot remember. When Sir Maurice displays her mother's coffin, Belle screams, distraught because she can't remember what happened to her mother. Maurice says she won't find answers in a book; Belle disagrees, believing there are creatures that can restore memories. However, Maurice refuses to let Belle leave the castle, telling her that magic comes at a price and he can't lose her too. Unfortunately, after posting a "Sorry" letter to her father, Belle looks at a map and says she needs answers, and that it can be found in a place called Arendelle.

Meanwhile, in Arendelle, Anna shows up back home and Elsa asks what she found out about their parents, but Anna, fearful of explaining the real truth to her sister, lies and says she found nothing. Anna then notices Elsa isn't making snowflakes and she tells her sister that she's learning how to get her magic under control. Elsa then introduces the Snow Queen to Anna as their aunt Ingrid, but Anna says their mother never mentioned having a sister. Ingrid explains she had been trapped in a magical urn by people who don't understand her, and demonstrates her magic as proof. Unconvinced, Anna tells Kristoff that she does not trust the Snow Queen, since there is no trace of her within the family portrait gallery or royal records, despite being reassured by Kristoff, who is still upset over postponing the wedding. Anna decides to visit Grand Pabbie and tells Kristoff to keep an eye on Elsa and Ingrid. Unbeknownst to either Kristoff or Anna, Ingrid has been eavesdropping on the conversation.

Later on, Belle is at Wandering Oaken's Trading Post & Sauna, asking and even begging for directions to the rock trolls. Overhearing this, Anna asks if she needs help and tells Belle that she come along with her, then they head out. Along the way, Belle and Anna walk and talk about the parents they've lost. Belle says she lost her memory and wants the rock trolls to restore her memory so she can be at peace. Anna says she'll try to get them to help her.

As they approach a tall cliff, Anna says they have to climb, and pulls out from Belle's bag a pick ax and starts to climb, but then immediately tumbles down, saying that Kristoff made this look easy. Anna's bag then falls open, displaying the box with the sorcerer's hat, which she tells Belle that she stole from a bad and twisted criminal that she hopes Belle never crosses paths with. Anna brings Belle to meet Grand Pabbie, who can restore her memories. He pulls something magical from Belle's head, then tells her to go where she lost her memories. Then, he gives her a stone, and tells her to it put in tea and drink it at the place where she lost her memories to get them back. Belle thanks Anna for her help and offers to repay her. Grand Pabbie then tells Anna that her mother, Gerda, had not one, but two sisters, Helga and Ingrid, as he was sworn to secrecy. He says that the three were close as children, Just like Elsa and Anna, but one day, the other two children vanished, no one knew what happened to them and they wanted to forget the tragedy, so he helped them by wiping their memories of all in Arendelle. When Anna asks why Ingrid wouldn't tell her there was another sister, she returns to Arendelle to ask Elsa. As Belle and Anna are leaving the cliffs they hear a noise, but it turns out to be a storm blowing up on them, and Anna says she thinks it's her aunt, not a storm, because Ingrid doesn't want her to tell Elsa what she found out. Anna then shows Belle the box and says that she can take her aunt's magic. Unfortunately, the memory stone falls from Belle's hand, and she has to choose between retrieving it and helping Anna, who is clinging to the cliff edge. The stone then tumbles and smashes, and Belle grabs for Anna, but she loses her to the rocks at the base of the cliff. Ingrid then shows up and takes the magic box from an unconscious Anna's bag. Belle tells her to leave Anna alone, but Ingrid says it's family business and disappears with Anna.

Belle later returns home, where her father awaits her. He tells Belle what happened to her mother, in which she sacrificed her life to save Belle. With the Ogre Wars getting worse and no manpower to stop them, Belle remembers Anna talking about a powerful wizard during their adventure, that can come and save the kingdom, despite Maurice's plea, of which would later result in Rumplestiltskin's arrival. Back in Arendelle, Anna later regains consciousness and wakes up in a dungeon cell, with Ingrid now holding her prisoner, believing that Anna will use the box to take Elsa's power. Anna denies this, but at the same time, she becomes suspicious as to why Ingrid never mentioned anything about Helga, so which Ingrid simply replies that some secrets are best kept buried. Ingrid, seeing Anna as a distraction, was hoping that she would a be part of a family with her and Elsa. Instead, Ingrid claims that after observing her, she realized that her idea of including all 3 of them in her family would never work out, and that it was time to replace Anna, thinking that she'll never accept her. Ingrid then tells Anna that soon, she'll finally have the one thing she always wanted, a family that loves and understands her.

=== In Storybrooke ===
Belle tells Mr. Gold that Emma Swan wants to see them at the Sheriff's office, where Emma, Henry, Regina, Hook, David, Mary Margaret, and Elsa, take a look at the video that featured Ingrid as Emma's foster mother. Emma believes that Ingrid might have erased their memories of her six months that she was in her care. David suggests that they all split up and search for Ingrid, with Henry giving them a clue as to where to find her: an ice cream truck. In the forest area called the North Woods, Emma, Regina, and Hook, along with Robin Hood and his Merry Men, discover the van empty, except for a locked container that Hook opens. When Emma opens it, she finds a file that Ingrid has kept of Emma since her arrival in the real world, along with her artwork. She also discovers a scroll that contains cryptic readings. As they search the woods, Regina tries to convince Robin that although he still has feelings for her, he should move on, but that she'll still try to save Marian for him.

Mr. Gold locates Ingrid and calls her out. Ingrid, knowing how well Gold works, tells him that she wanted Emma to find out about their past as part of her plan. Gold says he's there to offer her a deal, saying that if she declined, she'd better watch out. Then, Ingrid replies by saying that if there was something that he wanted from her, he should just take it, but she knows that he can't and needs leverage to make her accept the deal, so she turns him down, and warns Mr. Gold to stay out of her way. As Belle helps Elsa at the library, Elsa is convinced that everyone doesn't know if Anna is in Storybrooke, but Belle says otherwise and decides to seek out the answer back at the pawn shop. When Gold returns, she "uses" the fake dagger on him to take her to the Snow Queen's lair. After they find it, Belle orders Gold to stay outside while she goes in, but there is no sign of the Snow Queen anywhere. Belle then hears a voice, which draws her to a mirror, where an image of Belle taunts her for not saving Anna, and reveals the truth about her husband, including the revelation that the dagger she has is a fake. When Gold walks in, he tries to stop Belle, but the mirror's power consumes Belle, and she almost slices Gold's neck. After Mr. Gold's neck is nicked by the dagger, Belle breaks down and Gold whisks her away back to the pawn shop, where she asks her husband to forgive her for not trusting him, and they embrace.

Back at the Snow Queen's lair, Gold returns to confront Ingrid. Belle has been exposed to the mirror, meaning that Ingrid had threatened Belle, someone who was close to him. Gold warns her that he has something she wants, the Sorcerer's Hat, saying that as long as he has it, he has the leverage. Ingrid's presence is later uncovered in a family album that Elsa and Emma discover, which shows that Ingrid is her Aunt. Elsa then sees Emma's scroll and reads it, revealing a prophecy about a savior named Emma, who she "discovers" will become Ingrid's sister. Elsa says she thinks Ingrid believes the prophecy and is looking to replace her sisters. Belle shows up and says she's been keeping a secret from them. She decides to tell Elsa and Emma about what happened to Anna and the fact that Ingrid captured her, but that she doesn't know where Anna is now. She also tells them about the Snow Queen's mirror, which is part of a spell called the Spell of Shattered Sight, which could cause the whole town to turn on each other. Upon hearing this, Emma and Elsa believe that Ingrid's plan is to use the mirror to kill everyone around them, because once that happens, Ingrid will finally have the perfect family of three (only her, Elsa, and Emma) that she's always wanted.

== Reception ==
=== Ratings ===
The episode saw a 4% increase from the previous outing, posting 2.6/7 among 18-49s, with 7.54 million viewers tuning. It was also the evening's top rated scripted program.

In Canada, it delivered 2.030 million viewers, making it the most-watched broadcast that night.

=== Reviews ===
The episode received mixed reviews from critics.

In a review from Entertainment Weekly, Hilary Busis notes that "OUAT has a fondness for refrains and recurring motifs: "magic always comes with a price," magically-inflicted memory loss, "evil isn't born, it's made," quests to obtain Very Important Objects that come up once and are never spoken of again, "I will always find you," serious mommy issues. It shouldn't come as much of a shock, then, to find out that, like many an antagonist before her, Frostine—sorry, Ingrid—is nothing more than a disgruntled outcast looking for a place to belong. It is, however, a little bit of a letdown to learn that her motivation is so similar to Zelena's; it would've been nice for the show to give us at least another half-season before mining this same material once more."

Amy Ratcliffe of IGN rated the episode 6.0 out of 10, saying "While tonight's Once happily made forward progress with the Snow Queen's story (and it was fascinating), it didn't resonate in other areas. The dialogue between Belle and Elsa and Belle and Anna was weak, and Belle's development seems to be taking steps backwards. "

TV Fanatic gave the episode 4.6 out of 5 stars.
