= Once Upon a Time season 4 =

Once Upon a Time
- Season 4
- DVD cover
- Starring: Ginnifer Goodwin; Jennifer Morrison; Lana Parrilla; Josh Dallas; Emilie de Ravin; Colin O'Donoghue; Jared S. Gilmore; Michael Socha; Robert Carlyle
- No. of episodes: 22

Release
- Original network: ABC
- Original release: September 28, 2014 – May 10, 2015

Season chronology
- ← Previous; Season 3 Next → Season 5

The fourth season of the American ABC fantasy-drama series Once Upon a Time was announced on May 8, 2014. Like the previous season, it was also split into two volumes, with the first airing from September 28 to December 14, 2014, and the second from March 2 to May 10, 2015. Ginnifer Goodwin, Jennifer Morrison, Lana Parrilla, Josh Dallas, Emilie de Ravin, Colin O'Donoghue, Jared S. Gilmore, and Robert Carlyle return as principal cast members from the previous season, and are joined by Michael Socha, reprising his role from the spin-off series Once Upon a Time in Wonderland, in his only season as a regular.

Existing fictional characters introduced to the series during the season include the main antagonists for the two volumes, the Snow Queen and the Queens of Darkness (a triad of villains including returning character Maleficent, and new characters Cruella de Vil and Ursula), alongside Elsa, Anna, Kristoff, the Apprentice, Little Bo Peep and Poseidon.

== Premise ==
Elsa is brought by accident from the Enchanted Forest of the past to present day Storybrooke in search of her younger sister Anna. With help from Emma, Elsa discovers her past with the mysterious Snow Queen. Emma learns that the Snow Queen was her former foster parent who has plans to replace her long deceased sisters with Emma and Elsa, using the Spell of Shattered Sight to ensure no one can foil her plans. This ultimately leads to the Snow Queen's undoing and consequently Mr. Gold's banishment from Storybrooke. The Queens of Darkness, which consists of Maleficent, Ursula, and Cruella de Vil, are then reformed by Mr. Gold with plans to rewrite the Once Upon a Time book with the help of the Author, resulting in the creation of an alternate reality known as Heroes & Villains. Henry and Emma race to restore reality and the truth before the twisted inversion becomes permanent, but as they succeed in doing so, the Darkness is unleashed which leads to Emma making a sacrifice to secure Regina's happiness.

== Cast and characters ==
=== Main ===
- Ginnifer Goodwin as Snow White / Mary Margaret Blanchard
- Jennifer Morrison as Emma Swan
- Lana Parrilla as Evil Queen / Regina Mills
- Josh Dallas as Prince Charming / David Nolan
- Emilie de Ravin as Belle French
- Colin O'Donoghue as Captain Hook / Killian Jones
- Jared S. Gilmore as Henry Mills
- Michael Socha as Will Scarlet / Knave of Hearts
- Robert Carlyle as Rumplestiltskin / Mr. Gold

=== Recurring ===
- Sean Maguire as Robin Hood
- Georgina Haig as Elsa
- Elizabeth Lail as Anna
- Elizabeth Mitchell as Ingrid, the Snow Queen / Sarah Fisher
- Scott Michael Foster as Kristoff
- Kristin Bauer van Straten as Maleficent
- Timothy Webber as the Apprentice
- Victoria Smurfit as Cruella de Vil / Cruella Feinberg
- Merrin Dungey as Ursula / Vanessa
- Lee Arenberg as Dreamy / Grumpy / Leroy
- Beverley Elliott as Widow Lucas / Granny
- Patrick Fischler as Isaac Heller, the Author
- Faustino Di Bauda as Sleepy / Walter
- Christie Laing as Maid Marian
- Rebecca Mader as Zelena / Wicked Witch of the West
- Raphael Alejandro as Roland
- Eion Bailey as Pinocchio / August Booth
- Michael Coleman as Happy
- Gabe Khouth as Sneezy / Tom Clark
- Abby Ross as young Emma Swan
- Keegan Connor Tracy as Blue Fairy / Mother Superior
- John Rhys-Davies as Grand Pabbie
- Agnes Bruckner as Lilith "Lily" Page
- Jason Burkart as Little John
- David Paul Grove as Doc
- Jeffrey Kaiser as Dopey
- Mig Macario as Bashful
- Tony Amendola as Mister Geppetto / Marco
- Sarah Bolger as Aurora
- Jakob Davies as young Pinocchio
- Giancarlo Esposito as Magic Mirror / Sidney Glass
- JoAnna Garcia as Ariel
- Chris Gauthier as Mr. Smee
- Barbara Hershey as Cora Mills / Queen of Hearts
- Tony Perez as Prince Henry Mills
- Raphael Sbarge as Jiminy Cricket / Dr. Archie Hopper

=== Guest ===
- Pascale Hutton as Gerda, Queen of Arendelle
- Tyler Jacob Moore as Hans
- Nils Hognestad as Franz
- Marcus Rosner as Jurgen
- Sally Pressman as Helga
- Nicole Muñoz as Young Lily
- Charles Mesure as Blackbeard
- Wil Traval as Sheriff of Nottingham / Keith
- Oliver Rice as King of Arendelle
- Robin Weigert as Bo Peep
- Gabrielle Rose as Ruth
- Brad Dourif as Zoso
- Eric Keenleyside as Maurice / Moe French
- Frances O'Connor as Colette
- Jessy Schram as Cinderella / Ashley Boyd
- Darcey Johnson as Oaken
- Brighton Sharbino as Young Ingrid
- Ava Marie Telek as Young Gerda
- Bailey Herbert as Young Helga
- Jonathan Runyon as a younger Duke of Weselton
- Rebecca Wisocky as Madam Faustina
- Sebastian Roché as King Stefan
- Ernie Hudson as Poseidon
- Tiffany Boone as Young Ursula
- Jonathan Adams voices The Sorcerer / Merlin

== Episodes ==
No. overall	No. in season	Title	Directed by	Written by	Original release date	US viewers (millions)
67	1	"A Tale of Two Sisters"	Ralph Hemecker	Edward Kitsis & Adam Horowitz	September 28, 2014	10.20
Elsa finds herself in Storybrooke, and fearful of the intentions of its residents, creates a snow monster for protection. With Robin Hood’s wife, Marian, back in the picture, Regina wonders if her "happily ever after" with the former thief has completely quashed; while on their honeymoon, Gold finds an intriguing box that makes him question whether or not he should give Belle possession of the Dagger. Meanwhile, in Arendelle of the past, as Elsa’s sister Anna's wedding to Kristoff nears, Anna discovers that their parents, who died in a shipwreck during a violent storm, were heading to a mysterious destination in a quest that may have held the secret to containing Elsa’s out-of-control ice powers.
68	2	"White Out"	Ron Underwood	Jane Espenson	October 5, 2014	9.24
Elsa feels threatened by Charming and accidentally traps Emma with her inside an ice cave, with the frozen temperature placing Emma’s life in peril. Regina, depressed over her break-up with Robin Hood, secludes herself from the town and Henry. With the townspeople considering Mary Margaret their leader, she faces her first leadership task in trying to re-start a generator and restore the town’s electricity after Elsa unwittingly damages the power lines. Meanwhile, in the Enchanted Forest of the past, Anna tries to teach a meek David to fight Bo Peep, a warlord threatening to take David's home.
69	3	"Rocky Road"	Morgan Beggs	David H. Goodman & Jerome Schwartz	October 12, 2014	7.92
In Storybrooke, the mysterious Snow Queen—whose public identity is that of the owner of an ice cream shop—frame Elsa for putting a freezing spell on Marian to have the Storybrooke residents cast doubts on her. When David and Emma encounter Will Scarlet, they find out about the Snow Queen, only to discover that the Snow Queen knows Emma from a past encounter that Emma doesn't remember, though Mr. Gold does. Henry helps Regina track down the author of the Once Upon a Time book, and Hook believes Gold is still in possession of the real Dagger. Back in Arendelle of the past, Elsa and Kristoff must fend off Hans, who is plotting another attempt to take over Arendelle, only to unwittingly unleash the Snow Queen, who freezes him. She reveals herself as Elsa's aunt.
70	4	"The Apprentice"	Ralph Hemecker	Andrew Chambliss & Dana Horgan	October 19, 2014	8.07
Hook prepares for his first real date with Emma by making a deal with Gold to restore his missing hand in exchange for keeping Gold's secret about the Dagger that he gave Belle being fake. Hook discovers his restored hand brings out his dark side, and is forced into doing a favor for Gold to rid himself of the hand. Gold traps the Apprentice inside the Sorcerer's hat, and makes Hook responsible to ensure he won't tell Belle. Will tries to steal a book that features someone from his past and gets caught, while the Snow Queen's Storybrooke alias is revealed to be Sarah Fisher. Henry takes a job at Gold's pawn shop to find out who wrote the story book. In the past, Anna makes a deal with Rumplestiltskin in exchange for information on why her parents had traveled to the Enchanted Forest.
71	5	"Breaking Glass"	Alrick Riley	Kalinda Vazquez & Scott Nimerfro	October 26, 2014	6.87
Emma and Regina are forced to team up when Ingrid, the Snow Queen, leads them and Elsa into a trap. Ingrid conjures up an ice warrior to stop Regina and Emma, and uses an illusion of Anna to lure Elsa into chains, keeping her out of the way. The three ladies fight back, with Elsa overcoming her fear and destroying the chains, and Emma and Regina combining their powers to destroy the ice warrior. Ingrid acquires the services of Sidney and takes possession of the magic mirror. Meanwhile, Mary Margaret leaves Neal with Belle as she and David spend time together, only to be interrupted by Will escaping jail, who Mary Margaret later pardons. Emma has flashbacks of running away as a teenager, and finds videotape evidence that Ingrid is her foster mother.
72	6	"Family Business"	Mario Van Peebles	Kalinda Vazquez & Andrew Chambliss	November 2, 2014	7.54
As everyone attempts to track down Ingrid, Emma discovers that there is more to her connection than she expected, while Belle begins to recall her past encounter with Anna and forces Gold into leading her to Ingrid's lair. After Belle sees the mirror, Gold warns Ingrid that he will stop her from harming anyone close to him, and shows her the Sorcerer's Hat as proof. Belle reveals that Ingrid is planning to destroy everyone around Storybrooke by using a mirror in order to bring the only family into her world: her, Elsa, and Emma, who discovered a prophecy scroll that she is the savior that will become Ingrid’s sister. In the Enchanted Forest and Arendelle of the past, Belle seeks out help in finding out a way to remember her mother's death with the help of Anna, who is trying to keep Elsa from finding out the truth about her trip, until she becomes suspicious of Ingrid's presence. Anna discovers that Ingrid is hiding the truth about having another sister, causing Ingrid to imprison her and steal the box that contains the Sorcerer's hat.
73	7	"The Snow Queen"	Billy Gierhart	Edward Kitsis & Adam Horowitz	November 9, 2014	7.42
Ingrid's origins in Arendelle is revealed, where her close relationship with her sisters Helga and Gerda take a tragic turn after they seek out Rumplestiltskin's help to control her magic, leading to Ingrid accidentally killing Helga, and Gerda in turn trapping Ingrid in the urn. Gerda visits Grand Pabbie and asks him to make Arendelle forget about the existence of Ingrid and Helga. In the present, Ingrid allows Emma to capture her, but uses a ploy to make Emma's magic go awry, causing Emma to run away for fear of hurting her loved ones. Later, Regina continues to reject Robin Hood's offer to restart their romance, but ends up giving in to her desire. Meanwhile, Ingrid makes a deal with Gold to return her ribbons, in exchange for the secret to the missing ingredient that Gold needs to free himself from the dagger.
74	8	"Smash the Mirror"	Eagle Egilsson	David H. Goodman & Jerome Schwartz	November 16, 2014	6.80
74	8	"Smash the Mirror"	Ralph Hemecker	David H. Goodman & Jerome Schwartz	November 16, 2014	6.80
Emma's powers become uncontrollable, so she seeks help from Gold. Mary Margaret and David believe it might be better if Emma became "normal". Elsa steals a locator potion to find Emma. When the Snow Queen threatens Gold not to hurt Emma, he uses magical dust made from the urn's remnants to temporarily trap her. Back in Arendelle, Ingrid tries to convince Elsa that Anna was planning to remove her magic, but fails. Elsa and Anna obtain the urn and plan to use it on Ingrid. Elsa learns of the reason their parents left for the Enchanted Forest, and makes peace with it, as she sends Anna back into the prison to set up their trap for Ingrid. Regina convinces Mary and David that Emma's powers made her special. Robin Hood decides to help Regina find the author of the fairytale book and discovers a missing page. Elsa convinces Emma to accept herself, allowing Emma to control her powers. Gold takes Hook's heart to sever himself from the Dagger, enslaving Hook in the process. The Snow Queen places ribbons on Elsa and Emma to harness their power and shatter her mirror, casting the Spell of Shattered Sight over Storybrooke. In Arendelle's past, Ingrid uncovers the sisters' plot, and plans to turn Elsa against Anna, only for a cursed Anna to place Elsa in the urn. Ingrid then freezes Anna, Kristoff, and all of Arendelle. Rumplestiltskin comes to take Anna's necklace and the urn in exchange for the Sorcerer's hat but Ingrid turns over the box to the Apprentice instead, who leads her to 1982 Boston, prior to baby Emma's arrival.
75	9	"Fall"	Mario Van Peebles	Jane Espenson	November 30, 2014	6.43
Elsa enters the mines where she eventually finds Anna and Kristoff on a beach. It is revealed that Arendelle was left frozen for 30 years, after which Anna and Kristoff escape Hans and Blackbeard and are sent to Storybrooke, courtesy of Elsa using a Wishing Star, Anna's necklace, to wish for her sister. Meanwhile, Ingrid directs the Spell of Shattered Sight towards Storybrooke, and allows Gold, Belle, and Henry safe passage out of town. As the Spell of Shattered Sight approaches, Regina seals Henry in the mayor's office and herself in her vault. Snow and David lock themselves in the jail at the sheriff's station, while Kristoff is cuffed to the desk. Emma is put in charge of baby Neal.
76	10	"Shattered Sight"	Gwyneth Horder-Payton	Scott Nimerfro & Tze Chun	December 7, 2014	6.20
Anna informs Emma and Elsa that killing Ingrid is the only way to break the Spell of Shattered Sight. The ribbons Ingrid shares with Emma and Elsa keeps them from hurting her and can only be destroyed by hatred. Emma provokes Regina into shooting a fireball in hatred at them, dissolving the ribbons. Anna finds the letter from her mother, which Ingrid reads. Regretting her actions, Ingrid sacrifices herself to break the spell and reunite with her sisters. Rumple blackmails Hook into getting him, Belle and Henry out of Storybrooke before the spell takes over but Hook is unsuccessful in acquiring Henry. Once the spell is broken, Gold makes final preparations to leave town with Belle. In the past, Emma is fostered by Ingrid, and they grow close until Ingrid tries to get Emma to utilize her magic. Emma runs away and Ingrid moves to Storybrooke. In November 2011, during Emma's initial stay in Storybrooke, Ingrid takes Emma's memories of her.
77	11	"Heroes and Villains"	Ralph Hemecker	Edward Kitsis & Adam Horowitz	December 14, 2014	5.69
In the Enchanted Forest of the past, Belle is kidnapped by Maleficent, Ursula and Cruella de Vil as ransom in exchange for a gauntlet from Camelot that can reveal anyone's greatest weakness. Rumplestiltskin pays the ransom and leaves with Belle, but later returns to reclaim the gauntlet. In the present day, residues of Ingrid's spell prevent anyone who crosses the town line from returning. Rumple sends Hook out to find a portal door to Arendelle at the Sorcerer's Mansion to send Anna, Elsa and Kristoff back. Before she departs, however, Anna discloses Rumple's secret. Ingrid's freezing curse still lingers on Marian, so Regina breaks up with Robin so he can save Marian by taking her and Roland outside Storybrooke, thus cutting off the curse's magic. While the others rush to save Hook from Rumple, Belle finds the Camelot gauntlet. Realizing Rumple still loves power more, she uses the gauntlet to locate the real dagger, using it to save Hook and force Rumple to leave Storybrooke. Henry, Emma and Regina find a library in the mansion filled with blank story books, and together they set out to locate the Author. Six weeks later, in New York City, a powerless Rumple visits Ursula. They agree to team up to get their happy endings.
78	12	"Darkness on the Edge of Town"	Jon Amiel	Edward Kitsis & Adam Horowitz	March 1, 2015	6.66
As the Storybrooke residents attempt to move on from Gold, Emma, Regina, Belle, and Hook help free the fairies from the hat, unwittingly releasing the demon Chernabog in the process. Meanwhile, Gold and Ursula track down Cruella de Vil, and together they travel to Storybrooke's outskirts. Ursula and Cruella convince Regina and Emma to allow them to enter the town, in exchange for information on how to vanquish Chernabog. After the two secretly allows Gold re-entrance into Storybrooke, Gold reveals that he anonymously gave Belle information on how to free the fairies, and that the Chernabog was hunting the one with the greatest potential for darkness, who is revealed to be Emma. Later, David and Mary Margaret warn Ursula and Cruella to not disclose anything about a past meeting of theirs. Back in the Enchanted Forest of the past, Rumplestiltskin gathers Maleficent, Cruella, and Ursula in order to retrieve the Dark Curse, facing Chernabog in the process.
79	13	"Unforgiven"	Adam Horowitz	Andrew Chambliss & Kalinda Vazquez	March 8, 2015	6.72
In the past of the Enchanted Forest, before the first curse, Snow White and Prince Charming are asked by the Queens of Darkness to find the Tree of Wisdom, for answers on stopping the Evil Queen's Curse. Maleficent later reveals to Snow White that she will also be a mother as well, and asks for help in stopping the Curse to protect both of their children. But she refuses to help a villain. In present-day Storybrooke, Emma is unaware that Mary Margaret, David, and Hook are keeping secrets from her. Cruella, Ursula, and Gold bring Maleficent back to life, whose return could wreck Emma's relationship with her parents, while Hook's past with Ursula could affect his relationship with Emma. Regina attempts to find out if Pinocchio knew about the Author when he was August Booth, but a riff prompts Marco to keep him away from Regina; She later apologizes to Marco, who then gives her a bag that may hold the answer to the Author's whereabouts. Gold appears in Storybrooke undetected, and is stunned to see Belle and Will kiss. Mary Margaret tells Regina a secret they can't tell Emma: she was born with a potential for darkness, and Mary Margaret and David caused the loss of Maleficent's baby.
80	14	"Enter the Dragon"	Ralph Hemecker	David H. Goodman & Jerome Schwartz	March 15, 2015	5.88
Regina goes undercover to learn of the Queens' plan to reverse the stories that was ever written about the heroes, with Emma keeping tabs on Regina and the Queens. When Maleficent reveals that they're after Pinocchio and wants Regina to kidnap him, the plans take a different turn after Regina succeeds. At the same time, Mr. Gold, masquerading as Hook, informs Belle that the Queens are after the dagger and agree to hide it, only to have Belle end up being fooled by Gold, who needed the dagger to transform Pinocchio back into August Booth, surprising Regina, who has now "joined" the Queens after being accepted by them. Back in the Enchanted Forest of the past, Regina decides to help Maleficent regain her spirits, before the latter casts the sleeping curse on Aurora prior to her wedding to Prince Phillip.
81	15	"Poor Unfortunate Soul"	Steve Pearlman	Andrew Chambliss & Dana Horgan	March 22, 2015	5.79
As the heroes attempt to rescue August from Gold and the Queens of Darkness in their quest to track down the Author, Hook finds a way to make a deal with Ursula to get the information he needs to help the heroes as a way to make up for what he did back in the past, in which Hook made a deal with Ursula's father Poseidon that led to unfortunate consequences for both Hook and a young Ursula.
82	16	"Best Laid Plans"	Ron Underwood	Kalinda Vazquez & Jane Espenson	March 29, 2015	5.48
As Gold and the Queens of Darkness seek out the Author, Maleficent uses a sleeping spell on Storybrooke so they can find the page containing the Author and uses it as a deal with Gold to find her daughter. At the same time Mary Margaret and David must find a way to stop them in order to keep Emma from finding out about her fate. Henry, who has the page, finds the key to unlock the Author's door. He gives the duplicate to Regina, but Regina is quickly found out to be a double agent by the villains. David and Mary Margaret tell Emma the truth about their mistake and August reveals to Emma and Hook that there is more than one Author. When the Author is set free by the heroes, he escapes. Gold tells Maleficent that her daughter is alive, revealing that she was sent to the modern world, and named Lily. Back in the Enchanted Forest of the past, Snow White and Prince Charming encounter the Peddler, who leads them to the Apprentice in an effort to rid any potential darkness from their unborn child. The task becomes one of regret when the Sorcerer and the Apprentice send Maleficent's unborn daughter, as well as Cruella and Ursula, into the modern world.
83	17	"Heart of Gold"	Billy Gierhart	Tze Chun & Scott Nimerfro	April 12, 2015	5.17
Emma, still upset upon learning the truth from her parents, searches for the Author, who is later found by Gold. Nine weeks earlier, while in New York City, Gold confronts Robin Hood, who is about to move into Neal's apartment with Marian and Roland. When Gold experiences a heart attack, he enlists Robin to steal an elixir to save him, in exchange for letting Robin stay in the apartment, but after Robin completes the task, Gold discovers that the elixir was switched by Zelena. Following her apparent death, Zelena had traveled back in time (along with Emma and Hook, via her spirited soul) and killed Marian, before using the Six-Leaf Clover of Oz to take on her current form. She then returned and has been posing as Marian, to steal Robin from Regina and to make Gold suffer. She wants in on Gold's quest to find the Author and have him give her a happy ending, in exchange for the real elixir. In the present day, Zelena reveals to Regina on phone that she is alive, who is left with no choice but to have Emma become dark in order to save Robin. Back in the past in Sherwood Forest, Rumplestiltskin enlists Robin Hood to travel to Oz to steal the same elixir from Zelena.
84	18	"Sympathy for the De Vil"	Romeo Tirone	David H. Goodman & Jerome Schwartz	April 19, 2015	5.12
Cruella is determined to seek revenge on the Author, Isaac, by kidnapping Henry and forcing Emma and Regina to kill him, but it is later revealed that Gold is aware of his past with Cruella, and explains that this encounter will lead to Emma's descent into darkness. When Isaac is confronted by David and Mary Margaret, he tells them that Cruella will cause Emma's transformation; however, Emma kills Cruella while saving Henry. Back in the 1920s in London, Cruella, who was kept prisoner by her mother, meets Isaac, who vows to take her away from her mother. But when her mother reveals the truth about Cruella to Isaac, the consequences take a toll on both Isaac and Cruella for the rest of their lives.
85	19	"Lily"	Ralph Hemecker	Andrew Chambliss & Dana Horgan	April 26, 2015	5.21
Upon learning her former childhood friend Lily is Maleficent's daughter, Emma embarks on a trip to find her along with Regina, who wants to warn Robin Hood about Zelena. Emma locates a now-adult Lily but discovers Lily has been plotting revenge on Mary Margaret and David. Regina talks Emma down from going dark. They travel to New York to warn Robin Hood, only to find that Zelena is now pregnant with Robin Hood's child. Meanwhile, back in Storybrooke, Gold enlists Will to steal Belle's heart. After completing the task, Gold reveals that if his heart continues to darken, he will eventually die. He gives his blessing to Will to take care of Belle. Back in 1999 in Minnesota, Emma runs into Lily again. When Lily is revealed as a thief, Emma is thrown out of her foster home, and turns down Lily's offer to remain friends. The Apprentice appears to tell Lily about her magical past, and the Sorcerer reveals that Lily and Emma's fates are intertwined.
86	20	"Mother"	Ron Underwood	Jane Espenson	May 3, 2015	5.31
Lily is reunited with Maleficent in Storybrooke. Despite Maleficent deciding to forgive Mary Margaret and David, Lily still wants vengeance. Isaac informs Gold that he needs Emma's darkness for the ink to write the stories. Regina agrees to obtain the darkness-infused blood in exchange for Isaac's services. Gold passes out, due to his dying heart. Regina plots to do away with Zelena and slices Lily for her blood, leading to Lily transforming into a dragon and confronting Mary Margaret. Wanting to make up for lost time, Maleficent intervenes and Lily agrees to stay in Storybrooke for one week with her mother, while Emma forgives her parents, and Regina decides to spare Zelena. Gold orders Isaac to write a new story in which the villains will win. Back in the Enchanted Forest, before the first Curse, Cora returns to help Regina seek love, but her interference to ensure that Regina will have an heir to the kingdom results in Regina taking a potion which makes her infertile.
87	21	"Operation Mongoose"	Romeo Tirone	Edward Kitsis & Adam Horowitz	May 10, 2015	5.51
88	22	"Operation Mongoose"	Ralph Hemecker	Edward Kitsis & Adam Horowitz	May 10, 2015	5.51
Isaac completes the Heroes & Villains book and sends everyone but Henry to an alternate universe. Henry tracks down Isaac and discovers that Isaac has become a best-selling author. When Isaac refuses to undo everything (and since he no longer is the Author, having violated the Author's code), Henry uses a key that sends him and Isaac into the alternate universe. There, in order to undo Isaac's work, Henry has to convince a "Snow White" version of Regina to stop Robin Hood from marrying Zelena, while trying to rescue Emma, who is held captive in the tower by an "Evil Queen" version of Snow White. Henry and Hook help Emma escape the tower and the three race off to ensure that Robin doesn't marry Zelena. Isaac blackmails a "heroic" Rumplestiltskin into stopping Emma, but Regina later sacrifices herself. Since Isaac has lost his authority as an Author, the power now transfers to Henry, who picks up the pen at its call. Using Regina's blood, he reverts Isaac's work and sends everyone back to Storybrooke. The Apprentice offers Henry to become the Author, but he turns it down, snapping the pen. The Apprentice also frees an unconscious Gold from the Darkness in his heart by sending it into the Sorcerer's Hat, purifying Gold's heart and severing his link to the Dagger in the process. However, the Darkness escapes and attacks the Apprentice. Emma repels the Darkness out to the streets, but the Apprentice is wounded, and warns them that only the Sorcerer, Merlin, can stop the Darkness from destroying everything. The Darkness eventually reappears and attacks Regina, but Emma sacrifices herself, tethers her soul to the Darkness and vanishes, leaving behind the dagger with her name on it.

== Production ==
=== Development ===
The fourth season of Once Upon a Time was ordered on May 8, 2014, this announcement was followed by the announcement that the first half of the season will air during the autumn of 2014, while the second half will air during the spring of 2015. In August 2014, Maleficent was reported to be the main villain for the second half of the season. Prior to the season premiere, a special aired recapping the previous three seasons, and finished up with the introduction of the Frozen storyline. The theme for the season is "Never give up on the people you love".

Adam Horowitz initially announced that the 2-part episode, "Smash the Mirror", would air at the earlier time of 7/6c and will be two hours long, however this was later contradicted by the official Prime Time schedule which stated that it would premiere in its usual spot of 8/7c, the official ABC press release for the episode and the Futon Critic also supported this start time. Horowitz later clarified via Twitter that the extra hour was in addition to the already announced 22 episodes. He also confirmed that the winter finale would air on December 14, 2014, and later confirmed that the show will return from winter hiatus on March 1, 2015. On March 15, 2015, Horowitz confirmed that the last 2 episodes of the season will form a 2-hour episode.

It has been confirmed that, unlike the Frozen arc, the villains of the second half of season 4 will come from "[Once Upon a Time] mythology" instead of from their respective movies, so their origins will not be how people remember them, in particular, creator Adam Horowitz stated that "[Once] Cruella may have a different backstory than the one that people may remember from the movie" and explained that Maleficent has already been slotted into the mythology in previous seasons.

Another special, similar to the special that aired between the season 3 mid-season finale and premiere, aired an hour before the mid-season premiere on March 1, 2015 and was titled "Secrets of Storybrooke" and narrated by starring cast member Jennifer Morrison. The special focused on the topic of what it takes to have familiar fairy-tale characters who have been flipped on their heads from their respective origins.

=== Casting ===
After Once Upon a Time in Wonderland was canceled, it was reported that Michael Socha, who portrayed Will Scarlet / the Knave of Hearts in the spin-off, was in talks to join the main cast of Once Upon a Time as a series regular should the series receive renewal for a fourth season, this was later confirmed on April 20, 2014 and on May 8, 2014, Socha was hired following the renewal. Michael Raymond-James was confirmed to not be returning as a main cast member, since his character, Neal Cassidy, was killed off. During San Diego Comic-Con 2014, it was officially announced that Ginnifer Goodwin would be returning as Snow White / Mary Margaret Blanchard along with fellow cast members Jennifer Morrison as Emma Swan, Josh Dallas as Prince Charming / David Nolan, Colin O'Donoghue as Captain Killian "Hook" Jones and Jared S. Gilmore as Henry Mills, Lana Parrilla as the Evil Queen / Regina Mills and Emilie de Ravin as Belle. De Ravin also confirmed Robert Carlyle's return as Rumpelstiltskin / Mr. Gold, through a photo on her Instagram.

On July 1, 2014, it was announced that Scott Michael Foster and Elizabeth Lail had been cast as Frozen characters Kristoff and Anna, respectively. The following day, it was announced Georgina Haig had been cast as Elsa. On July 8, 2014, Elizabeth Mitchell was revealed to have been cast in an undisclosed role. It was later revealed that she would be playing an evil Snow Queen, much like the one from the original Hans Christian Andersen fairytale. The character would later be revealed to be Anna and Elsa's aunt Ingrid. A real reindeer was brought in to portray Sven. On July 28, 2014, Tyler Jacob Moore and John Rhys-Davies were both announced to be playing Prince Hans and Grand Pabbie, respectively. The third episode, "Rocky Road", revealed that the roles of two of Hans' brothers, Franz and Jurgen, had been given to Nils Hognestad and Marcus Rosner respectively.

Returning recurring cast members include Sean Maguire as Robin Hood, Christie Laing as Maid Marian, Giancarlo Esposito as the Magic Mirror / Sidney Glass, Beverley Elliott as Granny, Lee Arenberg as Dreamy / Grumpy / Leroy, Raphael Sbarge as Jiminy Cricket / Dr. Archie Hopper and Keegan Connor Tracy as the Blue Fairy / Mother Superior. Faustino Di Bauda also returned as Sleepy / Walter, as did Kristin Bauer van Straten as Maleficent.

On September 4, it was revealed that Frances O’Connor was cast as Belle's mother, Colette for the sixth episode, although appearances later on in the season were also hinted. A new character, Lily, has been cast to Nicole Muñoz, while Sally Pressman was given the role of Helga. It was announced on November 5, 2014 that Victoria Smurfit would be portraying Cruella de Vil in a recurring capacity later on in the season and that hints will be placed in the next few episodes. Another Disney villain was also cast in the form of Ursula from The Little Mermaid who was portrayed by Merrin Dungey, the character portrayed is named after the original sea-goddess who was portrayed by Yvette Nicole Brown in the season 3 episode, "Ariel". Straten, Smurfit, and Dungey all first appeared in the winter finale, "Heroes and Villains", and are collectively called the "Queens of Darkness".

On October 17, 2014, Rebecca Wisocky was revealed to have been cast as the con-artist Madam Faustina for the tenth episode, "Shattered Sight", while a few days later on October 22, David Paul Grove, Gabe Khouth, Michael Coleman, Mig Macario and Jeffrey Kaiser were confirmed to be returning as the remaining seven dwarves. On October 25, 2014, Ginnifer Goodwin revealed that Mary Margaret's and David's son, Neal Nolan, is portrayed by eight different babies, adding: "I used to be like, 'babies look like babies.' And now that I have a baby, I'm like, how does the audience not notice that in every shot, this is a different kid?"

The season's first episode, "A Tale of Two Sisters" saw the return of Jason Burkart as Little John, who reprised his role in the sixth episode, and Raphael Alejandro as Roland who reprised the role in the third and sixth episodes, and introduced Pascale Hutton as the Queen of Arendelle, Anna and Elsa's mother, who reappeared in the seventh episode while the second episode, "White Out", introduced Robin Weigert as Bo Peep, and saw the return of Gabrielle Rose as Ruth, Prince Charming's mother. The fourth episode, "The Apprentice", introduced Timothy Webber as the Apprentice who reprised his role in the two-hour episode "Smash the Mirror", and the sixteenth episode, "Best Laid Plans". The fourth episode also saw the return of Brad Dourif as the previous Dark One, Zoso. The fifth episode, "Breaking Glass", saw the return of Abby Ross as a teenage Emma, who later also appeared in "Shattered Sight", "Best Laid Plans" and "Lily".

The sixth episode, "Family Business" saw the return of Eric Keenleyside as Maurice, Belle's father, and introduced Darcey Johnson as Oaken. The following episode, "The Snow Queen", saw the return of Jessy Schram as Ashley / Cinderella and Sarah Bolger as Aurora, and it also introduced Brighton Sharbino as a younger version of Elizabeth Mitchell's character, Ingrid, Ava Marie Telek as a younger version of Gerda, the Queen of Arendelle, Sally Pressman as Helga, Bailey Herbert as a young Helga, and Jonathan Runyon as a younger Duke of Weselton. The ninth episode, "Fall", saw the return of Charles Mesure as Black Beard. Patrick Fischler was cast in the recurring role of a Peddler initially named Gorin, who first appeared in "Best Laid Plans" where he was revealed to also be the Author.

During a second Q&A on December 15, 2014, Horowitz confirmed the return of Joanna Garcia Swisher as Ariel. On December 18, Eion Bailey was confirmed to be returning as August Booth / Pinocchio for "multiple Season 4 episodes", starting with the fourteenth episode, "Enter the Dragon". It was also revealed that Ernie Hudson had been cast as Poseidon, who is also Ursula's father, and Sebastian Roche as King Stefan. In February 2015, Rebecca Mader was confirmed to be returning as Wicked Witch of the West / Zelena and Wil Traval was revealed to be returning as the Sheriff of Nottingham / Keith.

Agnes Bruckner was confirmed to appear in a three-episode arc in the role of an adult Lily, a friend of Emma from her childhood who was portrayed by Nicole Muñoz in the fifth episode, "Breaking Glass". On February 28, Horowitz confirmed the return of Barbara Hershey as Cora later in the season. The thirteenth episode, "Unforgiven", which aired on March 8, 2015, saw the return of Tony Amendola as Geppetto / Marco and Jakob Davies as young Pinocchio, his older counterpart Booth, portrayed by Bailey, was reintroduced in the following episode. The episode that aired on March 22, 2015, "Poor Unfortunate Soul", saw the return of Christopher Gauthier as William Smee and introduced Tiffany Boone as a younger version of Ursula. The following episode, "Best Laid Plans", saw the return of Barclay Hope as Lily's adoptive father.

=== Promotion ===
A screening event for the season premiere, "A Tale of Two Sisters", was held on September 21, 2014, at the El Capitan Theatre.

The first half of the season used the tag-line "#OnceIsFrozen" for most of its run, and "#ShatteredSight" for the episodes "Fall" and "Shattered Sight". The second half of the season used the tag-line "#QueensOfDarkness" for most of its run, "#Cruella" for the episode "Sympathy for the De Vil", and "#HeroesAndVillains" for the season finale.

=== Broadcast ===
The season aired simultaneously on CTV in Canada, and on TVNZ in New Zealand.

== Reception ==
=== Critical response ===
The review aggregator website Rotten Tomatoes reported a 58% approval rating with an average rating of 7.5/10 based on reviews from 11 critics. The website's consensus reads, "The addition of a Frozen subplot feels like a marketing angle, but Once Upon a Time's season four shines, adding more layers to an already complex story."

=== Ratings ===
Viewership and ratings per episode of Once Upon a Time season 4
No.	Title	Air date	Rating/share (18–49)	Viewers (millions)	DVR (18–49)	DVR viewers (millions)	Total (18–49)	Total viewers (millions)
1	"A Tale of Two Sisters"	September 28, 2014	3.7/11	10.20	1.0	2.72	4.5	12.92
2	"White Out"	October 5, 2014	3.3/9	9.24	1.2	2.84	4.4	12.08
3	"Rocky Road"	October 12, 2014	2.7/7	7.92	1.3	3.02	4.0	10.94
4	"The Apprentice"	October 19, 2014	2.7/7	8.07	1.2	2.79	3.9	10.86
5	"Breaking Glass"	October 26, 2014	2.4/6	6.87	1.1	—N/a	3.5	—N/a
6	"Family Business"	November 2, 2014	2.6/7	7.54	1.3	3.04	3.9	10.57
7	"The Snow Queen"	November 9, 2014	2.5/7	7.42	1.4	3.39	3.9	10.81
8–9	"Smash the Mirror"	November 16, 2014	2.4/6	6.80	1.2	2.89	3.6	9.69
10	"Fall"	November 30, 2014	2.1/5	6.43	1.1	2.69	3.2	9.12
11	"Shattered Sight"	December 7, 2014	2.0/5	6.20	1.2	2.97	3.2	9.17
12	"Heroes and Villains"	December 14, 2014	1.7/5	5.69	1.2	2.76	2.9	8.45
13	"Darkness on the Edge of Town"	March 1, 2015	2.2/6	6.66	1.1	2.55	3.3	9.21
14	"Unforgiven"	March 8, 2015	2.1/6	6.72	0.9	—N/a	3.0	—N/a
15	"Enter the Dragon"	March 15, 2015	1.8/6	5.88	1.1	2.52	2.9	8.40
16	"Poor Unfortunate Soul"	March 22, 2015	1.9/6	5.79	1.0	2.50	2.9	8.29
17	"Best Laid Plans"	March 29, 2015	1.7/6	5.48	1.1	2.47	2.8	7.95
18	"Heart of Gold"	April 12, 2015	1.6/5	5.17	1.1	2.51	2.7	7.68
19	"Sympathy for the De Vil"	April 19, 2015	1.7/5	5.12	1.0	2.49	2.7	7.61
20	"Lily"	April 26, 2015	1.7/5	5.21	1.0	2.19	2.7	7.40
21	"Mother"	May 3, 2015	1.7/6	5.31	1.0	2.37	2.7	7.68
22–23	"Operation Mongoose"	May 10, 2015	1.8/6	5.51	1.0	2.46	2.8	7.97

The premiere episode of the season, "A Tale of Two Sisters", achieved a weekly viewership ranking of #21.
