= Shattered Sight =

- Once Upon a Time episode
- Episode no.: Season 4 Episode 10
- Directed by: Gwyneth Horder-Payton
- Written by: Scott Nimerfro & Tze Chun
- Production code: 410
- Original air date: December 7, 2014

Guest appearances
- Lee Arenberg as Dreamy/Grumpy/Leroy; Beverly Elliot as Widow Lucas/Granny; Scott Michael Foster as Kristoff; Georgina Haig as Elsa; Elizabeth Lail as Anna; Elizabeth Mitchell as the Snow Queen/Ingrid; Abby Ross as Young Emma Swan; Rebecca Wisocky as Madame Faustina; Faustino Di Brauda as Walter/Sleepy; David Paul Grove as Doc; Gabe Khouth as Tom Clark/Sneezy; Mig Macario as Bashful; Jeffrey Kaiser as Dopey; Michael Coleman as Happy; Ilas Webb as Kevin

Episode chronology
| ← Previous "Fall" | Next → "Heroes and Villains" |
- Once Upon a Time season 4

"Shattered Sight" is the tenth episode of the fourth season of the American fantasy drama series Once Upon a Time, which aired on December 7, 2014.

In this episode Emma Swan, Elsa, and Anna try to stop the Snow Queen, while flashbacks show Emma's past with the Snow Queen.

== Title card ==
The Spell of Shattered Sight flows over the forest.

== Plot ==
=== Event chronology ===
The Land Without Magic flashback with the Snow Queen in Boston takes place in 1982, immediately after "Smash the Mirror" and before "Best Laid Plans" and the Land Without Magic flashback where Emma moves into Ingrid's home takes place in 1999, the year after "Breaking Glass" and two years before "Tallahassee" and "There's No Place Like Home" (this story also takes place in the same year as "Lily"). The scene with Ingrid and Emma at the funfair takes place about six months after they began living together, between August 26 and September 1. Ingrid and her foster daughter visit a funfair together and the flashbacks where Ingrid tries to make Emma explore her magic powers take place a week later.

The flashback where the Snow Queen arrives in Storybrooke takes place in 2001, the same year as "Tallahassee", "There's No Place Like Home", "The Heart of the Truest Believer", and "Save Henry" and several years before "Firebird". The Storybrooke flashback with Ingrid and Emma takes place in November 2011, between "The Price of Gold" (Emma is wearing her blue leather jacket, which arrives with the rest of her things in this episode), and "That Still Small Voice", where Emma becomes deputy sheriff (Emma is about to call Sheriff Graham to have him arrest Ingrid; if she was already a deputy, she would have the power to arrest Ingrid herself). The present day Storybrooke events take place after "Fall".

=== In the Characters' Past ===
Ingrid arrives in Boston in 1982. She finds a psychic shop; a Fortune Teller named Madame Faustina and tries to receive her fortune, only to learn that the "seer" is a charlatan. Enraged, Ingrid attempts to freeze her, but then discovers that she has no magic. She leaves, vowing to wait as long as it takes to find Emma Swan.

In Richfield, Minnesota in 1999, Emma has just become one of Ingrid's foster children. Though Ingrid intervenes when one of her charges keivn steals Emma's camera, Emma attempts to leave when the bully still demands the device. Ingrid encourages Emma to stay by telling her that her bully is afraid of spiders. The two bond in the short time and Ingrid files to adopt Emma. When a carnival claw machine sparks, Ingrid believes it proof of Emma's magical talent and attempts to test it by throwing the both of them in front of an oncoming car. However, this only has the effect of breaking their bond as Emma runs away.

In 2001, Ingrid travels to Maine, where she unravels the prophecy scroll and finds herself in Storybrooke. In November 2011, when Emma wanders into Any Given Sundae, she recognizes its proprietor Sarah Fisher as Ingrid. Ingrid attempts to convince her of Henry's claims about magic were true, only to be met with denial and anger. Ingrid then removes all memories of herself from Emma into a memory stone, explaining why Emma doesn't remember her in the present.

=== In Storybrooke ===
As everyone in Storybrooke begin to attack each other, fighting and riots break out across the town. At the sheriff's station Elsa, Emma, and Anna, the only ones aside from Ingrid and Rumple, immune to the curse, try to come up with a plan to stop Ingrid while at the same time deal with keeping Mary Margaret and David from each other's throats by separating them in different jail cells. Recalling the story that Ingrid got the curse from, Anna reveals that killing Ingrid, the caster of the curse, would potentially be the way to reverse its effects. Worried for Anna's safety, Elsa and Emma leave baby Neal with a reluctant Anna, while Emma and Elsa confront Ingrid at her ice cream shop, they discover their powers cannot work on her due to the ribbons on them. This gives Emma an idea: to go the Vault and face Regina, who was sealed inside for her own safety.

Meanwhile, the protection spell is causing Regina to believe that Emma trapped her inside, and as she sees herself in the mirror Regina changes her clothes to those she used to wear as the Evil Queen. When Emma and Elsa arrive and unseal the Vault, Regina uses her pyrokinetic powers against them and they shield themselves with the ribbons on their wrists; the ribbons burn away, freeing Emma and Elsa. Emma uses her powers to stall Regina from going after them. Regina, believing that Emma went to the Sheriff's station, shows up there, only to set up a battle between herself and Mary Margaret. Regina sends Anna and Kristoff back to the beachfront, from where they reunited with Elsa and met Emma back in the previous episode, "Fall". As Kristoff yells at Anna, saying that his life would've been better off if the two had never gotten engaged, a hurt Anna then trips on the bottle that her parents threw from their sinking ship in the episode "A Tale of Two Sisters". Anna picks up the bottle and hits Kristoff on his head knocking him out, allowing the letter that was inside the bottle to fall out. Anna then reads the letter, and she races off to the Snow Queen's lair.

At her lair, Ingrid proceeds to the next part of her plan is to restore the good memories of Emma and Elsa back to them, while stating that they do not have it in them to kill her. Anna then arrives with the letter (written by her and Elsa's mother, Gerda) that revealed the truth of Ingrid and Helga being Elsa and Anna's maternal aunts, while stating that Arendelle deserved to know all about Ingrid and Helga. Ingrid then begins to attack Anna by telekinetically choking her to death, against Elsa and Emma's protests to let her go, and manages to knock her down. As Elsa and Emma rush to Anna's aid, making sure she's alright, and upon reading the note, a tearful and repentant Ingrid sees that Anna is right as she touches the memory stone which shows her memories of her sisters and begins to regret her actions. Ingrid then undoes the Spell of Shattered Sight by sacrificing her own life. Before she dies, Ingrid states that Emma has found her family and returns the lost memories of Emma and Elsa to them now that she has her own younger sisters' love. She also finally accepts Anna as a part of the family and apologizes. She was so caught up in anger and revenge she forgot what was inside of her love, and they both reconciled, mending their aunt-niece bond. Ingrid says the three of them are special and to never forget that, then disappears into the afterlife where she reunites with Gerda and Helga. After Elsa and Anna embrace, they decide that once they return home, they will bring back their kingdom's memories of Ingrid and Helga.

Meanwhile, Hook comes to see Gold about the chaos going on around Storybrooke, and Gold says that as long as he has his heart, he is immune to the curse. As Gold prepares to pack up and leave town, he tells Hook to grab Henry and meet him and Belle at the town line, since he will not use his magic to bring Henry to him. When he reached New York City, Gold would make sure they would never remember any what happened in Storybrooke but explain that the town was destroyed. Hook heads to the Mayor's office to see Henry and tells him to come with him. Henry, affected by the curse, calls Hook a dirty pirate and says he did not like him before and likes him less now that he's with his mother, Emma, and asks him to leave. Hook uses the potion that Gold gave him to break the spell and he heads in, but Henry has spread marbles all around and Hook goes down, allowing Henry to flee for his safety. Hook chases him but is confronted by Will, who initiates a fist-fight. Hook knocks out Will, but the delay allows Henry to escape.

Thanks to Anna helping get through to Ingrid, the Spell of Shattered Sight is finally broken; the shards turn into snow and Storybrooke returns to normal, including Regina and Mary Margaret, who immediately stop fighting and start laughing. Mary Margaret and David run up to Emma to hug her, while Henry runs to Regina and hugs both her and Emma. As Neal begins to wake up, David tells Mary Margaret to forget what happened under the curse, then the couple kiss as a reconciliation while Emma, Elsa, and Anna embrace each other. Finally, Gold checks on Belle as she is sleeping, when Hook arrived to the pawnshop and tells him Henry got away. Gold asks how he failed at kidnapping a child, only to have Hook respond to that answer by saying his heart wasn't in it. Since Gold knows that the Snow Queen's plan failed, he tells Hook it's his last day on earth. Hook makes a final request as a dying wish to leave Emma and the rest of Storybrooke intact. Gold says as long as Emma doesn't get in his way, she'll survive. He says once he steps over the line with his magic, they have nothing to fear from him – but says he can't make that promise for the rest of the world. Confident that he will go through with his plans, a smug but sinister Gold leaves the pawnshop to walk out into the fresh Storybrooke snowy air.

== Reception ==
=== Reviews ===
The episode received positive reviews.

Hilary Busis of Entertainment Weekly gave a positive review: "Phew! Season 4A's penultimate episode veered from campy fun to big-hearted earnestness and back again so quickly that I'm still feeling the aftereffects of whiplash."

Christine Orlando of TV Fanatic gave the episode a positive review, rating it 4.5 out of 5.

Amy Ratcliffe of IGN gave the episode a great review: "After moving slowly for the last couple of episodes, the Snow Queen's reign ended tonight. Her story ended beautifully, and it was a nice – if sad - turn for her to sacrifice herself rather than having Elsa and Emma take her down. Love once again conquered all, and Once works well when it hearkens back to that fairy tale truth." Ratcliffe gave the episode an 8.7 rating out of 10.
