= Breaking Glass (Once Upon a Time) =

- Once Upon a Time episode
- Episode no.: Season 4 Episode 5
- Directed by: Alrick Riley
- Written by: Kalinda Vazquez & Scott Nimerfro
- Production code: 405
- Original air date: October 26, 2014

Guest appearances
- Georgina Haig as Elsa; Elizabeth Lail as Anna; Elizabeth Mitchell as Snow Queen; Giancarlo Esposito as Sidney/Magic Mirror; Abby Ross as young Emma; Nicole Muñoz as Lilith "Lily" Page; Barclay Hope as James Page, Lily's father; Kelly-Ruth Mercier as the store manager; Anson Hibbert as a policeman; Ilias Webb as Kevin

Episode chronology
← Previous "The Apprentice"	Next → "Family Business"
- Once Upon a Time season 4

"Breaking Glass" is the fifth episode of the fourth season of the American fantasy drama series Once Upon a Time, which aired on October 26, 2014.

In this episode Emma Swan and Regina Mills search for both Elsa and the Snow Queen, while flashbacks show Emma meeting Lily.

== Title card ==
A bridge of ice crystallizes in the forest.

== Plot ==
=== Event chronology ===
The Land Without Magic events take place in 1998, after "Snow Drifts", and the year before "Lily" and the flashbacks with Ingrid and young Emma in "Shattered Sight". The Storybrooke events take place after "The Apprentice".

=== In the Characters' Past ===
In Emma Swan's previous life as a teen in our world, it is 1998 in Hopkins, Minnesota, and she is shoplifting Pop Tarts. She is then saved by another girl, who uses a lie to keep store security from arresting her. Afterwards, the girl tells Emma she needs a stolen credit card to steal smarter, and when they see a man chasing after them, a van pulls up, allowing them to escape. The girl then introduces herself to Emma as Lily. Later on Lily sees Emma eating her sandwich fast, as Emma explains that bigger kids would steal food at the orphanage, and added that she ran away from Boston after Cecilia (who was previously seen driving away from the orphanage in a flashback from the previous season) found a family, while Lily admits that the person chasing them was from Social Services. The two then spot a lake that featured homes and break into one of them. After taking break from playing video games, Lily shows Emma a star on her wrist and makes her a copy. Lily then asks Emma to swear to her that they be friends for life. Emma then finds a video recorder and they make a tape of themselves.

Later that night, Emma wakes up and tells Lily that someone has shown up in the house. As Emma takes a poker from the fireplace, the person with the flashlight is revealed to be Lily's father, and Emma is stunned that Lily lied to her. It turns out Lily's parents were worried sick about her. As Emma is about to be taken into custody by Social Services, she refuses Lily's note, wipes the drawn star from her wrist and walks away.

=== In Storybrooke ===
In the forest, Ingrid has started conjuring an ice warrior in an icy lair, as she prepares to make another move on both Emma and Elsa, who are looking through files to find out more about their connection to the Snow Queen. But Elsa on the other hand is frustrated that they aren't out looking for her, thinking that the Snow Queen somehow stole their memories of her. As Hook helps the ladies by bringing in more files, a neglected Will complains they've forgotten his dinner, but instead of the bangers and mash he was demanding, Emma hands him a pop tart she's already nibbled on instead. Will is already having an issue with Hook, as he is ready to take Henry out for sailing, claiming that Hook is doing it for brownie points for Emma, only to have Hook shut Will up. After he kisses Emma and leaves, Elsa shows Emma photos of her and Henry, which Emma concludes came from Regina when she was spying on them, only to come across another photo that shows Emma with Ingrid. This prompts the women to pay a visit to Regina at her vault, where she is summoning Sidney to find Sarah, but after refusing to take no for an answer by claiming that he has not found The Snow Queen, Regina warns Sidney to make it a priority or he'll regret it, and he complies. As Elsa and Emma arrive to the vault, Emma, still blaming herself for bringing Marian back, wants to work things out with Regina, saying she feels like they are in a bad place and wants to fix it. Elsa suggest that Emma talk to Regina alone to try and work on it. However, the rift between the two women continues to linger, even as Emma, after asking Regina about the photos and to seek out Sidney's help, offers to help Regina revive Marian, with Regina telling Emma that she'll never have her back and vice versa. As this plays out, Elsa starts seeing what looks like Anna in the cemetery calling out for help, and she gets out of the vehicle. Emma then races out and finds her missing, followed by Regina, who then opens her compact mirror to see Sidney, who informs her that he found Ingrid.

Wasting no time tracking Elsa to the east of the toll bridge, Emma and Regina walk through the woods when Emma asks her what tracking magic she's using. However, Regina chastises Emma for not honing her magic; Emma, on the other hand, says she's learned better from Regina, telling her that helping Robin save Marian is admirable, which Regina scoffs as sucking up to her, saying she's not going to let her win her over because she ruined her life and there's no coming back from it even if Emma thinks she didn't mean to do it. She tells her to learn to live with it: "Welcome to my world," as Regina puts it mildly. As Elsa races through the woods calling for her sister, she encounters a cliff edge and sees what she believes is Anna across the divide, and as she tells her that in coming over, Elsa conjures an ice bridge and goes racing across it, only to be stunned as she sees her sister disappear. Elsa then calls out for Anna and finds her standing in a snow field, and as expected, just as she hugs her sister and says she's glad to find her, Ingrid turns Anna into an ice block that disappears, then conjures ice chains onto Elsa and tells her that the Anna she saw was an illusion, rather than the actual Anna, much to Elsa's horror. Ingrid says she needs Elsa, telling her she should have learned to control her magic and the ice chains will go stronger with Elsa's fear, while at the same time keep her out of the picture by "building" a snowman. As Emma and Regina reach the ice bridge, the two are held back by a wind gust, which Regina discovers was coming from Sidney, who is now under the control of The Snow Queen, and after crossing it before it crumbles, the two discover an ice warrior waiting for them, and after they fail in taking it out, both Emma and Regina combine their powers and destroy the monster. They learn that Ingrid had this trap all planned for the women; she takes the mirror from Regina, and then chokes Emma and Regina. After Elsa overcome her fears by talking her way out of the chain allowing her to break free, she comes to Emma and Regina's aid and saves them. Satisfied with her scheme, Ingrid tells Elsa that she is pleased with her overcoming her fears, but as Elsa issues a fight and Regina issues a challenge, Ingrid disappears. Regina confesses to Emma about Sidney and her plan to kill Marian, but admits that she still doesn't want to mend fences with Emma and disappears even as Elsa tries to mediate. As Elsa tells Emma that she knows that Anna is still out there, she reminds Emma not to give up on Regina as Anna does the same with Elsa. Emma later returns to the Vault to talk to Regina about her past encounter with a friend that she pushed away because she lied to her, pointing out that she doesn't want to make that mistake and won't trying. Regina tells Emma to stop there and says despite their differences she does not want to kill Emma, to which Emma takes it as a start.

In between the scenarios, Mary Margaret asks Belle to babysit Neal for a while as she and David decide to go for a hike together, despite Mary Margaret's reluctance to leave Neal with another person but David tells her not to worry. In an effort to calm her fears, David gives Belle a walkie-talkie so they can contact her. When they arrive to the Sheriff's office David notices Will has escaped from his cell, giving him an idea to chase Will down like back in the days in The Enchanted Forest, but Mary Margaret thinks she ought to stay and take care of Neal, so David takes off after him. Moments later, Mary Margaret hears someone digging near the shore and spots Will, who was looking for a map that he had in his sack but can not find it.. Mary Margaret then figures that David helped Will escape after admitting to getting drunk and breaking into the library. Mary Margaret immediately pardons Will. As David returns to find out about Neal, he learns from Mary Margaret about Will but says that Will escaped on his own, saying that Will earned the pardon.

Back at the forest, Ingrid releases Sidney from the mirror but tells him it's not him she wants, it's the mirror itself because it contains dark magic and adds that mirrors reflect mood, desire and essence, serving as the temporary receptacle for the fraction of our soul. Ingrid says she will have what has been denied to her for a long time. She refused to elaborate to Sidney any more details, and opens a portal to an ice fortress for Sidney so he can enjoy his freedom, reminding him to take a warm coat because "it's about to get cooler around here." Ingrid then takes the broken glass shard and puts it into a large mirror, which made it complete. This puts everything in motion for Ingrid to have the one thing she has desired: a family. And as Hook returns to a surprised Emma and to offer a drink, she takes out a file box and opens the contents, among them a video camera which featured Lily. Unfortunately, in a surprise twist not even Emma saw coming, the video now features a new footage of a teen Emma chasing two boys who took her camera, then hears a woman telling them to give it back to Emma. The woman is none other than Ingrid, who is revealed to be Emma's foster mother from our world.

== Production ==
When the press release for the episode went out, this episode was to also guest star Oliver Rice as Kai, the King of Arendelle and Pascale Hutton as Gerda, the Queen of Arendelle; but they were not featured in this installment.

== Reception ==
=== Ratings ===
This episode posted a 2.3/6 among 18-49s, with 6.87 million viewers tuning in.

In Canada, it delivered 1.864 million viewers, the second most-watched broadcast that night.

=== Reviews ===
The episode received good reviews from critics, who commented positively the relationship between Emma and Regina.

In a review from Entertainment Weekly, Hilary Busis notes that "Though Sidney Glass (a.k.a. the Magic Mirror, a.k.a. the Genie, a.k.a. Gus Fring) gets name-checked in the title of tonight's episode, he's more of a side attraction than the main event. "Breaking Glass" easily could have been renamed "The SwanQueen Hour," given how much of it was devoted to Emma and Regina teaming up and navigating the tricky waters of their relationship. As fans of one of OUAT's most venerable 'ships will be pleased to know, that journey ends with the queen and the savior in a place of mutual understanding and, perhaps, even friendship. Did you hear the way Regina finally admitted that she doesn't really want to kill Emma? For her, that tone was downright warm!"

Amy Ratcliffe of IGN rated the episode 7.6 out of 10, saying "Tonight's Once featured some great exploration of Emma and Regina's relationship, and the series shines when it focuses on those interactions. While the Snow Queen plot should be further along, we did see more of how formidable an enemy she is."

Seat 42F had a mixed but positive take on the episode: "ONCE UPON A TIME is having a rough fall, better than last spring's batch, but lacking the cohesiveness and the rich layers of the previous autumn's Neverland arc. “Breaking Glass” does much to get the show back on track, but unfortunately, in doing so, it has to stray from some established bits in recent weeks. Here's hoping ONCE figures out what it needs to do and sticks with it in time to salvage this story."

TV Fanatic gave the episode 4.5 out of 5 stars.
