= The Apprentice (Once Upon a Time) =

- Once Upon a Time episode
- Episode no.: Season 4 Episode 4
- Directed by: Ralph Hemecker
- Written by: Andrew Chambliss & Dana Horgan
- Production code: 404
- Original air date: October 19, 2014

Guest appearances
- Scott Michael Foster as Kristoff Bjorgman; Georgina Haig as Ice Queen/Elsa; Elizabeth Lail as Anna; Elizabeth Mitchell as Snow Queen; Brad Dourif as Zoso; Timothy Webber as The Apprentice; Catherine Bogdanova as Spaghetti Lady; Emmanuel Fappas as Bartender; Garry Garneau as Spaghetti Man

Episode chronology
← Previous "Rocky Road"	Next → "Breaking Glass"
- Once Upon a Time season 4

"The Apprentice" is the fourth episode of the fourth season of the American fantasy drama series Once Upon a Time, which aired on October 19, 2014.

In this episode, Mr. Gold forces Hook to help him put a man (the Apprentice) inside the hat, while flashbacks show Rumplestiltskin's past encounter with Anna.

== Title card ==
An magically animated broomstick walks through the forest.

== Plot ==
=== Event chronology ===
The opening scene in the Enchanted Forest takes place "a long time ago", after the Enchanted Forest flashbacks with Merlin and Nimue in "Nimue", and at an unspecified time before "Desperate Souls", and the rest of the Enchanted Forest events take place after "White Out" and before "Family Business". The Arendelle events take place after "Rocky Road" and before "Family Business". The Storybrooke events take place after "Rocky Road".

=== In the Characters' Past ===
A long time ago, the Apprentice (Timothy Webber) is sweeping a vault, when an unknown Dark One intrudes, later revealed to be Zoso. The Dark One knocks him aside and attempts to open a box, but is repelled by an enchantment placed on it by The Sorcerer. The Apprentice tells the Dark One that the box cannot be opened by someone who has succumbed to the darkness in their heart. The Dark One vanishes in a rage, and the Apprentice says that no Dark One will ever open the box.

Anna (Elizabeth Lail) arrives at Rumplestiltskin's (Robert Carlyle) tower and talks to him about the disappearance of her parents. Rumplestiltskin offers to help if she puts the contents of a vial into the Apprentice's drink telling her that he is an evil man. Anna states that she will do "whatever it takes" to find out why her parents visited The Enchanted Forest and Rumplestiltskin comments that he loves when people say they will do whatever it takes. Anna goes to the man's house and after a brief conversation she has a chance to put the vial's contents into his tea but instead decides to throw them into the fire thinking that it is poison. Anna arrives back at Rumplestiltskin's tower and informs him that she gave the contents of the vial to the Apprentice. Mr. Gold says that is good because it is an antidote to a poison he was given yesterday. Anna, horrified by this, tells Rumplestiltskin the truth and says they must go back to the cottage. They look in Rumplestiltskin's crystal ball and see the man succumbing to the poison by turning into a mouse.

They go to the cottage and Rumplestiltskin states he won't change the man back if they find him because he is protecting the box. Anna realizes that Rumplestiltskin is the person who poisoned the Apprentice. He goes on to tell her that the man is just the first line of defense. In order to open the box he needs magic from someone who faced their inner darkness and succeeded as he was planning on Anna not giving the antidote. Anna says that she doesn't have inner darkness and Rumplestiltskin reminds her that due to the contract she will spend the rest of her life in his tower. Rumplestiltskin taunts Anna by stating that Elsa (Georgina Haig) will be heartbroken since Anna left because of her and become a monster. He also states that the wedding will now be off. Anna refuses to accept this and holds a sword to Rumplestiltskin's heart, demanding him to rip up the contract. He urges her to run him through with the sword, but she collapses after having thought about actually killing Rumplestiltskin. Anna sheds a tear, which Rumplestiltskin collects on his dagger which allows him to open the box. Anna chides Rumplestiltskin for using love as a weapon, but he replies that love is a weapon, it is just that he knows how to wield it more than others.

Rumplestiltskin emerges from the vault with the box and Anna tells him to tell her what happened to her parents since she helped him retrieve the box. Rumplestiltskin tells Anna that the King and Queen of Arendelle arrived on his doorstep seeking a way to take away Elsa's powers forever. Anna argues that her parents loved Elsa, but Rumplestiltskin argues that their actions implied that they feared her. He tells her that they did not find what they were looking for, but the box contains a sorcerer's hat which can take away any person's magic. Rumplestiltskin states that the hat will make him unstoppable when the hat has enough power. Anna tells him that the Apprentice could stop him, but Rumplestiltskin states he is no longer there. However, the Apprentice, now in the form of a mouse, jumps onto Rumplestiltskin's hand and bites him, causing him to drop the dagger. Anna picks up the dagger and realizes that she can control him with the dagger. Anna uses the dagger to force Rumplestiltskin to give her the box, and saying he will never harm either of the sisters and their family, as well as commanding him to turn the Apprentice back into his human form. He agrees and sends Anna away in a puff of red smoke, before screaming in a fit of a rage.

Back in Arendelle, Kristoff (Scott Michael Foster) is talking to Sven when all of a sudden, Anna appears. The two embrace and share a kiss. She tells Kristoff that her parents left Arendelle to find a way to get rid of Elsa's powers, and Anna says she has no idea what to tell Elsa.

=== In Storybrooke ===
Mr. Gold is shown in his shop opening the box and producing the sorcerer's hat. Emma Swan (Jennifer Morrison) arrives at Granny's diner and asks Captain Hook (Colin O'Donoghue) out on a date. Hook makes Emma promise to let him plan the date. She leaves and on the way to her car she notices a puddle underneath it that was not there when she entered. Mr. Gold arrives at his shop to find Hook sitting on a counter. Hook asks Mr. Gold to reattach his hand because Hook knows that Belle has a fake dagger. Mr. Gold does so but warns Hook that he is no longer the man that hand belonged to and attaching it may have unforeseen consequences. The Charmings, David (Josh Dallas) and Mary Margaret (Ginnifer Goodwin), are shown helping Elsa at their loft by going through spell books. Emma asks their opinion wearing a dress for her date with Hook and all three are breathless. Hook arrives and presents Emma with a red rose from his newly restored hand. Emma is impressed by Hook's dating clothing. Hook tells Emma to refer to him as Killian. Emma and Hook are at dinner and noticed by Will Scarlet (Michael Socha) who tries to exit without them noticing but accidentally knocks wine on to Emma's lap. Hook grabs Will and tells him to apologize to Emma in a menacing voice. When Emma realizes he is from the ice cream shop Will runs from the couple. Hook looks at his hand and begins to wonder about Mr. Gold's warning.

Regina (Lana Parrilla) and Henry (Jared S. Gilmore) are going through Regina's stores of potions in her vault and cannot find something that will unfreeze Marian. Henry surmises that Robin Hood is still in love with Regina because true love's kiss did not unfreeze her. Regina says that this time Henry may be too young to fully understand everything. Hook walks Emma home and at the door to the loft they share a kiss after Emma jokingly invites him in for coffee with her parents. During the kiss Hook notices his left hand again acting aggressively. Emma walks inside and has a moment when she seems to realize Hook's hand's actions and has a brief conversation with her parents. Hook runs into a drunk Will Scarlet trying to break into the library and punches him in the face when Will refuses to stop. Hook again is put off by his hand controlling his actions and tells Will that if he informs anyone of what happened he will be a dead man. As Mr. Gold is preparing to go home in his car with flowers Hook enters the passenger door and tells Mr. Gold to replace his hand with the hook. He refuses, saying Hook should've heeded his warnings. Hook threatens to inform Belle (Emilie de Ravin) of the dagger, but Gold then tells Hook that he has swapped the daggers and that Belle has the actual dagger. Mr. Gold says he will replace the Hook once Hook does a favor for him. He refuses to give Hook a definite date or time and Hook states he can find a way to remove it without magic. Mr. Gold tells Hook that since his magic restored the hand, only his magic can take it off. Enraged, Hook thrusts the hook into Gold's chest. Mr. Gold is unharmed, stating he would have thought Hook would have learned the first time he tried to kill Rumplestiltskin. Hook states that it wasn't him that did that, and Mr. Gold states that the next time he may harm someone else who he cares about. Hook states he will do whatever it takes and Mr. Gold says that he loves it when people say that. He tells Hook to meet him on the docks in the morning.

Emma is driving through the town when her car spins out on a small patch of ice. She chases the Snow Queen (Elizabeth Mitchell) and demands to know why she is being followed, but the Snow Queen vanishes. Belle calls Emma and tells her to meet her at the library because there is a situation. Will Scarlet is seen in the library next to a bottle of alcohol and a copy of Alice's Adventures in Wonderland. Mr. Gold finds Hook sleeping on the docks and wakes him. He produces a broom and tells Hook it is going to help him find an old friend. When Mr. Gold lets go of the broom it begins walking off and he tells Hook to follow it. Mr. Gold and Hook arrive at a red house in town and knock on the door. The Storybrooke version of the Apprentice answers the door and Mr. Gold tells Hook to force him into a chair. Mr. Gold then opens the box and produces the hat. The Apprentice tells Mr. Gold that no Dark One ever succeeds with the hat, stating that he will never have enough power to use it. Mr. Gold then uses the hat to pull the man into the hat and increase its power.

Back at Mr. Gold's shop he swaps Hook's hand for the actual hook, but says that their deal is not done. Hook says that it is done because he saw Mr. Gold use the real dagger to open the box, which means he is still lying to Belle. Mr. Gold produces a video tape with a recording from the house they just left, threatening to reveal it to Emma. Hook states he only did it to rid himself of the cursed hand to be a better man, and that Emma will understand that. Mr. Gold then reveals that the hand is not cursed, but it allowed Hook to be "the man he really is." Mr. Gold states the hand allows him to be his true pirate self and embrace his darkness. Hook threatens that he'll have no problem "crushing Belle's heart" with the truth of Gold's deception and Mr. Gold states if that happens, he will "lose" Emma. For his threats, Gold states that Hook now serves him for as long as he lives, anticipating the "fun" they will have together. Emma visits the jail to talk to Will Scarlet and shows him the book he was found next to. He tries to say it has no meaning to him. Emma looks at his eye and asks what happened. Will sees Hook arrive and claims that he does not remember what happened to his eye. When Emma asks him about his hook being back, Hook states that Mr. Gold's magic wasn't what he had hoped it would be. David, going through documents with Elsa, tells Emma that the Snow Queen's alias, Sarah Fisher, is nowhere in any Storybrooke records stating that she did not arrive at the town via the curse. Hook, Emma, David and Elsa all look at each other wondering how the Snow Queen arrived at Storybrooke and Emma asks what she wants with her. Henry tells Regina that they need to talk to his other grandpa, Mr. Gold, about finding out who wrote the book to find the author. Regina says that Mr. Gold will not want to help her, so he goes to the shop and tells Mr. Gold that he wants to work at the shop. Henry states that because his father is dead Mr. Gold is the closest link to him, Mr. Gold agrees to let Henry be his apprentice, but tells him not to touch anything. Then, Mr. Gold hands him the broom he and Hook used to find the Apprentice. After Mr. Gold leaves, Henry begins to sweep the floor (in the same manner the Apprentice was sweeping earlier).

== Production ==
This episode refers to the apprentice, of whom Gold tries to acquire the hat.

== Reception ==
=== Ratings ===
The outing held steady, placing a 2.7/7 among 18-49s with 8.07 million viewers tuning in, as it tied with the same ratings numbers from the previous episode even though it saw an increase in viewers.

In Canada, it delivered 1.714 million viewers, making it the second most-watched program that night.

=== Reviews ===
The episode received positive reviews from critics.

In a review from Entertainment Weekly, Hilary Busis notes "If you spent the rest of the hour swooning, though, you may have missed out on the explication of a few crucial plot points. As its name implies, "The Apprentice" focused on revealing why, exactly, Rumpelstiltskin was so tickled to discover that Sorcerer's hat in the house where he and Belle honeymooned in season 4's premiere. As it turns out, the object is more than just a groovily decorated cap—it's also an artifact of immense power that could have enormous implications for the rest of our heroes. Well, that, or it's just another magical doohickey that seems important for a while until it disappears from the narrative without a trace. On this show, anything's possible!"

Amy Ratcliffe of IGN rated the episode 8.7 out of 10, saying "Tonight's Once had a few weak points with characters (mostly Emma) acting dense, but it featured delightful performances, meaningful character moments and developments, and more than a few laugh out loud moments. Basically, it had heart. And further exploration of the Sorcerer's Hat plot added an interesting layer to the story."

TV Fanatic gave the episode 4.4 out of 5 stars.
