= Best Laid Plans (Once Upon a Time) =

- Once Upon a Time episode
- Episode no.: Season 4 Episode 16
- Directed by: Ron Underwood
- Written by: Kalinda Vazquez & Jane Espenson
- Production code: 416
- Original air date: March 29, 2015

Guest appearances
- Eion Bailey as August Booth; Kristin Bauer van Straten as Maleficent; Merrin Dungey as Ursula; Patrick Fischler as Peddler/Author; Victoria Smurfit as Cruella de Vil/Cruella Feinberg; Keegan Connor Tracy as Blue Fairy/Mother Superior; Abby Ross as Young Emma Swan; Timothy Webber as The Apprentice; Michelle Choi-Lee as Adoption Agent; Gabe Khouth as Sneezy; Barclay Hope as James Page

Episode chronology
← Previous "Poor Unfortunate Soul"	Next → "Heart of Gold"
- Once Upon a Time season 4

"Best Laid Plans" is the sixteenth episode of the fourth season of the American fantasy drama series Once Upon a Time, which aired on March 29, 2015.

In this episode David Nolan and Mary Margaret tell Emma Swan the secret they have been keeping from her; and Regina is found out by Mr. Gold, Maleficent, and Cruella, while flashbacks show Snow White and Prince Charming's past with the Apprentice and with Maleficent.

== Title card ==
A unicorn galloping through the forest.

== Plot ==
=== In The Characters' Past ===
In the Enchanted Forest, before the first curse, Snow White and Prince Charming come across a unicorn and touch its horn to see what the future holds for their unborn child. Charming sees a happy baby Emma, but Snow sees a vision of a teenage Emma ripping her heart out and crushing it. Later on, the couple run into a peddler, who tells them that Maleficent has transformed into a dragon and has laid an egg. The merchant then advises the couple to follow a path that leads them to the Apprentice's cottage. The Apprentice tells the Charmings that their child is a blank slate, and either one of their premonitions could come true, but adds that it is possible to banish the darkness from a child, and in order to do that they would have to find another blank slate to contain the darkness. Snow begins to believe that Maleficent's egg is the ideal vessel to take on the darkness, as it will only grow into a heartless dragon anyway.

The Charmings later return to the cave where Maleficent, as a dragon, is guarding her egg. As they attempt to take the egg, Maleficent awakens and pleads with Snow, but the Charmings take the egg anyway (although Snow vows to return it unharmed), and bring it to the Apprentice, who then transfers the darkness from their unborn child with a powerful, irreversible curse. Unfortunately, The Apprentice left out one detail; the creature inside the egg will become the darkest force ever seen. He claims that he has no choice but to open a portal and banish it to where it can do no harm. The egg begins to hatch to reveal a harmless human baby inside, and the Charmings beg the Apprentice to stop the spell to no avail. Cruella and Ursula arrive, furious and intent on rescuing the baby, and are sucked into the portal along with the egg. The Apprentice explains that all three have been sent to a realm where they will not hurt anyone again.

Some time later, the Charmings receive a unicorn-themed mobile for the baby's room. Snow does not want the reminder of what they had done hanging over their child, but Charming believes it is a reminder that they can become the best possible people that they can be, and that the mobile should stay. The couple then vow to never succumb to the darkness again, and to always do the right thing, for the sake of their daughter.

=== In Storybrooke ===
August is in a deep sleep at the Fairies' nunnery, having been changed by magic too many times, and Regina is left with no choice but to take a photo of the illustration of the door that was torn from the book. She shows it to Gold, Maleficent, and Cruella, who notice a glare on the image, leading Gold to conclude the page is protected by magic and that the Author is actually hidden inside the page. Maleficent then casts a sleeping spell all over Storybrooke so Gold and the Queens can steal the page; in exchange for her help, she tells Gold to find out what happened to her child after Mary Margaret and David "got rid of it."

Gold and the Queens go to steal the page, only to discover it missing. Henry, who is immune to the curse because a person can only be put under the sleeping spell once, has escaped with the page. He calls Mary Margaret and David, who are also immune to the curse, and tells them he is in the Sorcerer's mansion. David believes that the only way they can keep Emma from going dark is to destroy the page, but that would mean keeping the Author trapped inside the page forever. As Henry waits for his grandparents, he notices a light that begins to shine from the illustration of the door. It shines a light on a desk drawer that Henry opens to reveal a key; as he takes it out, Regina and the Queens arrive. Regina demands that he hand over the page and he complies, unknowingly giving them a fake page forged by Emma. Mary Margaret and David then arrive; at their request, Henry gives them the key and leaves. They plan to toss the page into the fireplace, but Mary Margaret stops David, saying that they cannot destroy everyone's chance of a happy ending, and that heroes should do what is right. The couple decides it is time to tell Emma the truth.

Gold visits a sleeping Belle at the pawn shop and explains that the reason he is searching for the Author and wants to change the destiny of the villains is so the world can be safe and free of all evil. He mysteriously claims that his magic has racked up so much debt, that it is about to catch up to him and punish him for what he has done (as he talks to her, he is seen rubbing his chest where his heart is). He vows to come back to her, then steps outside to meet up with Regina, Cruella and Maleficent. He has noticed the forgery and is onto Regina's deception, so Maleficent places her under the sleeping curse. Since their deal has fallen through, Gold decides not tell Maleficent about what happened to her child, saying that the pain would become worse if she knew the truth, but she begs him to tell her and he complies, as he shows Maleficent a vision that 30 years earlier a man had adopted the baby, whom he named Lilly. It is then revealed that it is the same girl with the star on her wrist who befriended young Emma.

Later, Mary Margaret finally comes clean to Emma; Emma is disappointed and leaves angrily. Hook chases after Emma to tell her August has awoken, and they return to see August ask about the key, which could help Emma learn more about her past. August reveals that there was more than just one author, and the person who was trapped inside the book was the most current Author, who eventually began manipulating the stories for his own twisted enjoyment. After he went too far and manipulated the Apprentice so that he would banish Maleficent's child for him, the Sorcerer and the Apprentice condemned him to life in the book. Despite the warning, Emma is determined to meet the author. As Emma opens the door with the key, a person emerges, revealed to be the same peddler who encountered Emma's parents back in the Enchanted Forest. He escapes before he can answer Emma's questions, and when she chases him out into the street, where he mysteriously disappears.

== Cultural references ==
- August Booth names one man who held the position of Author as Walt. This is a direct reference to Walt Disney, the famed American cartoonist, animator, film producer, and the co-founder of The Walt Disney Company.
- August states that the job of the Author "goes back eons from the man who watched shadows dance across cave walls and developed an entire philosophy". This is a reference to the Greek philosopher Plato, and his Allegory of the Cave.

== Reception ==
=== Ratings ===
The episode saw an 11% drop from the previous episode, as it posted a 1.7/5 among 18-49s with 5.40 million viewers tuning in. The drop was attributed to increased competition from the NCAA Men's Basketball playoffs on CBS (which pushed the start of the network's lineup back by 17 minutes) and the iHeart Radio Music Awards on NBC.

=== Reviews ===
The episode was met with excellent reviews with critics praising the plot and performances, particularly Kristin Bauer van Straten.

Amy Ratcliffe of IGN said of the episode, "The revelations about the way Maleficent lost her child and the role of the Author were satisfying and neatly tied together various plot threads. Fitting all the puzzle pieces into the past so they affect the present without disrupting it can't be simple, but this episode is a great example of how the flashbacks we see can give us a better understanding of characters we've known for a few years." Ratcliffe gave the episode an 8.7 rating out of 10.

Hilary Busis of Entertainment Weekly noted that the outing was well outlined to keep viewers wanting to know what will happen as the series took a two-week break so ABC can air The Ten Commandments: "So it’s a good thing that tonight’s episode gave us both big answers and a bit of a cliffhanger, all the better to keep us both satisfied and intrigued during the next 14 days." She also added "Normally, when an episode of television is titled “Best Laid Plans,” it's because someone in the cast is going to get lucky."

In a review from Rickey.org, Nick Roman cites "Best Laid Plans" "is one of the better Once Upon A Time episodes to engage with this theme in some time. So, for that reason, I feel like this episode is well worth checking out."
