= Rocky Road (Once Upon a Time) =

- Once Upon a Time episode
- Episode no.: Season 4 Episode 3
- Directed by: Morgan Beggs
- Written by: David H. Goodman & Jerome Schwartz
- Production code: 403
- Original air date: October 12, 2014

Guest appearances
- Scott Michael Foster as Kristoff Bjorgman; Georgina Haig as Ice Queen/Elsa; Elizabeth Mitchell as Snow Queen; Tyler Jacob Moore as Hans; Beverly Elliott as Granny; Raphael Sbarge as Jiminy Cricket/Archie Hopper; Sean Maguire as Robin Hood; Lee Arenberg as Grumpy/Leroy; Raphael Alejandro as Roland; Christie Laing as Marian; Nil Hognestad as Franz; Charles Raaul Singh as General; Marcus Rosner as Jurgen; Mark Goldman as Sven (voice)

Episode chronology
← Previous "White Out"	Next → "The Apprentice"
- Once Upon a Time season 4

"Rocky Road" is the third episode of the fourth season of the American fantasy drama series Once Upon a Time, which aired on October 12, 2014.

In this episode, Elsa is framed, while flashbacks show Elsa meeting her aunt, The Snow Queen.

This episode marks the introduction of Michael Socha as Will Scarlet to the main cast, who recently featured in the spin-off series Once Upon a Time in Wonderland.

== Title card ==
The Storybrooke's ice cream shop, "Any Given Sundae", stands in the forest.

== Plot ==
=== Event chronology ===
The Arendelle events take place after "A Tale of Two Sisters". The Storybrooke events take place after "White Out".

=== In the Characters' Past ===
In the wake of her sister Anna heading off towards Misthaven, a concerned Elsa is now panicking over her sister's mission, even as Kristoff tells her that her kingdom needs her more than Anna does right now. Elsa then receives news that Prince Hans is leading an army straight to Arendelle, so she has to stay and prevent him from attempting to take control of the kingdom once again. While spying on the former regent and his 12 brothers, Kristoff discovers that Hans has brought with him a sketch of an urn that once it is in use, will be able to trap people. Kristoff, fearing that he will use the urn on Elsa so he can take over Arendelle, returns to warn Elsa, who decides to follow Kristoff along after he volunteers to go after Hans before he carries out his plot.

Hours later, and after making a trek towards a cave, Elsa and Kristoff discover the urn that was kept hidden. When Elsa discovers an unfamiliar language encrypted on the item, it leads to confusion between her and Kristoff over whether to destroy it or not, only to be caught off guard by Hans and his brothers, who then takes a sword to Kristoff and demand that Elsa drop the urn or he'll kill him. After Elsa gives in, she hands over the urn to Hans, then warns Kristoff to search for Anna. Smugly, Hans remarks that a monster like Elsa shouldn't rule Arendelle, and he uncaps the relic, only to discover that a person was already inside: the Snow Queen, who forms out of a white liquid. After she is unleashed, the Snow Queen freezes Hans, and his brothers flee from the cave. Arriving at the castle, Elsa and the Snow Queen chat about their ice powers. Seeing a portrait of Elsa's parents, the Snow Queen reveals that Elsa's mother Gerda was her sister. Still concerned about Anna, Elsa relates these fears to her newly discovered aunt, who promises to assist her. She also tells Elsa about finding others like them who may have met the same fate as her.

=== In Storybrooke ===
Robin Hood, Marian, and Roland visit "Any Given Sundae", where the Snow Queen serves them ice cream, but unknown to them she casts a spell on the ice cream cone that she gave Marian. Meanwhile, Elsa, joined by Emma and Hook, pay Gold a visit and to find out if he has known Anna based on the necklace Elsa found in his pawn shop. Belle uses the fake dagger to “command” Gold to tell the truth but it fails, as he knows nothing about Elsa or Anna, and wishes them the best of luck finding her.

Robin, Marian and Roland join the other residents at the Mayor's office, as Mary Margaret, who is still trying to balance both maternal and mayoral duties, is holding the first annual “Mayor’s Fireside Chat,” where she assures the citizens that they are no longer afraid of Regina's influence, but it appears that they want Mary Margaret to do something about the town's snowy fiasco. Mary Margaret then tells the residents about Elsa's presence in Storybrooke and is trying to reassure everyone that she is not dangerous, only to have Marian beginning to start feeling as if something was glossing over her and she passes out. Elsa's presence has also resulted in her becoming a prime suspect, and with her heart slowly freezing, a cure must be found before Marian's heart completely freezes and kills her. The Storybrooke residents blame Elsa, who is being framed by the Snow Queen for the icy cold mayhem. With the entire town ready to go after their newest addition, Emma (who starts to question her abilities as Savior) and Hook decide to hide Elsa at the sheriff's office while she and David search for the real suspect.

Regina and Henry team up to attempt to find out the identity of the author. Before they can do that, Robin arrives to tell Regina about Marian's frozen state. As Regina is quick to suspect Elsa, as she believes that darker magic is behind this but Elsa denies it to Regina. They believe a true love kiss will wake Marian up, but after Robin kisses her, nothing happens. David and Henry surmise that the cold is creating a barrier, preventing the kiss from working, like when Frederick was turned into gold.

Emma and David arrive at Robin Hood's campsite in the forest, and as Emma draws her gun and orders whoever is inside the tent to come out, she encounters former Merry Man Will Scarlet and she demands to know who he is, but as he about to escape David catches him. Will tells the two that he doesn't know anything about the ice wall around Storybrooke, but reveals that he went into the ice cream parlor while the electricity was out, and saw that despite the blackout, the products in the back were still frozen. When they arrive at the shop, however, they find the kitchen area in deep freezing temperatures, but Will sneaks off and take the money from the register. Meanwhile, Hook decides to take Elsa to Gold's Pawn Shop instead, where he tells his former archenemy that he knows about the Dagger of Kris that Gold still has in his possession, and promises to keep it a secret, but only on the condition that they find out where they can locate the real suspect, and hopefully, find Anna. Using a piece of Marian's hair strands, Gold casts a spell to serve as a tracer to origin of the freezing spell cast on it. Elsa and Hook are able to trace it back to the Snow Queen in the forest, but as Hook tries to contact Emma with a cellphone, and later by person, the Snow Queen traps Hook's legs in ice, and when she tries to kill Hook with sharp icicles, she tells Elsa that she neutralized her powers, to keep her from interfering. Then, she discovers that Elsa has lost her memories. She tells Elsa that the Rock Trolls wiped her memory, while trying to convince her that it was Anna who had placed her in the urn. As the Snow Queen prepares to use an ice attack on Hook, Emma arrives just in time to use her powers, allowing the Snow Queen to get away upon getting distracted by helping David free Hook before the large icicles could fall on him. Emma was surprised that the Snow Queen knew Emma's name, but Elsa suspects that the Snow Queen might be lying about her remembering their past experience and about her past with Emma, although Emma assures Elsa they'll find out together.

Later on that evening, Robin confesses that he knows why the kiss did not work, although he kissed Marian, he's still in love with Regina. Regina then tells Henry to bring her a box and pulls her heart out before her body freezes, indicating it is alive and promises Robin that she will find a cure for his wife. As Emma tries to remember her past encounter with the Snow Queen, Hook confronts her, and Emma explains that after losing Neal, Graham and Walsh, she did not want to lose Hook either. They then share a kiss together.

Later that night, the Snow Queen is approached by Gold, who asks if Emma remembers her. As it turns out, Gold tells her that Emma will remember her eventually, but when he asks if she needs his help, the Snow Queen declines, and states that when she's ready to make a deal, she'll come to him. Gold says that he eagerly awaits that moment and walks away.

== Production ==
This episode is named after the ice cream flavor that the Snow Queen gives to Marian that puts her under a frozen spell.

This episode marks the introduction of Michael Socha as Will Scarlet/the Knave of Hearts to the main cast, who previously starred in the spin-off series Once Upon a Time in Wonderland.

== Reception ==
=== Ratings ===
This outing posted a 2.7/7 among 18-49s with 7.92 million viewers tuning in, an 18% drop from the previous episode.

In Canada, it delivered 1.963 million viewers, making it the night's second most-watched program.

=== Reviews ===
The episode was met with good reviews, most of it directed towards the performances from Elizebeth Mitchell and Jennifer Morrison.

In a review from Entertainment Weekly, Hilary Busis mentioned several good points about this episode, including this one: "And so Once continues to play its favorite game: Families Are Complicated, Y'all! A new baddie who's secretly related to one of our heroes is hardly uncharted territory, but at least Mitchell's presence is livening up the Frozen arc. And while I'm still not sure that Once has done enough to justify devoting this much time to characters from a movie that was released less than a year ago, season 4's third episode did at least have a little more time to spare for the folks who have been around since the pre-"Let It Go" days. (Though we still don't know what the deal is with that damn Fantasia hat.)"

Amy Ratcliffe of IGN rated the episode 7.5 out of 10, saying "Tonight's Once had entertaining points and featured an intriguing entrance for the Snow Queen. She's a quieter sort of villain, and that's a nice change. We inched closer to finding out how Elsa got trapped in the urn and where Anna is, but the episode fell flat in a few places because characters didn't act like themselves."

TV Fanatic gave the episode 4.6 out of 5 stars.
