= A Tale of Two Sisters (Once Upon a Time) =

- Once Upon a Time episode
- Episode no.: Season 4 Episode 1
- Directed by: Ralph Hemecker
- Written by: Edward Kitsis & Adam Horowitz
- Production code: 401
- Original air date: September 28, 2014

Guest appearances
- John Rhys-Davies as Grand Pabbie (voice); Giancarlo Esposito as Sidney Glass/Magic Mirror; Lee Arenberg as Grumpy; Faustino Di Bauda as Sleepy; Sean Maguire as Robin Hood; Georgina Haig as Ice Queen/Elsa; Elizabeth Lail as Anna; Scott Michael Foster as Kristoff Bjorgman; Oliver Rice as the King of Arendelle/Kai; Pascale Hutton as the Queen of Arendelle/Gerda; Raphael Alejandro as Roland; Jason Burkart as Little John; Christie Laing as Marian; Mark Goldman as Sven (voice) - uncredited

Episode chronology
← Previous "There's No Place Like Home"	Next → "White Out"
- Once Upon a Time season 4

"A Tale of Two Sisters" is the first episode of the fourth season of the American fantasy drama series Once Upon a Time, which aired on September 28, 2014. The episode introduces several characters from the 2013 film Frozen to the series. The episode also has the characters deal with the consequences of Emma Swan (Jennifer Morrison) and Killian "Hook" Jones's (Colin O'Donoghue) time traveling in the third season finale.

Commentators gave generally positive reviews for the premiere, with most complimenting the new characters and the new direction the series was taking; however, some felt that the series was capitalizing too much on the success of the episode's source material.

Upon airing, the premiere was watched by 9.47 million viewers and attained an 18-49 rating of 3.5. This marks a significant increase in viewership and ratings from the previous season premiere.

== Title card ==
Snowflakes fall and settle on the forest floor.

== Plot ==
=== Event chronology ===
The Enchanted Forest flashback with Gerda and her husband takes place years after the events of "The Snow Queen" and five years before the Arendelle events, which take place two years after the events of Frozen (2013), (Note: Jennifer Lee, co-writer and co-director of Frozen, stated in 2019 that the events related to the Frozen characters in the series are not considered canon to the continuity of the Frozen franchise, ahead of the release of Frozen 2.) before "Rocky Road" and before Anna arrives in the Enchanted Forest in "White Out". The Enchanted Forest flashback with Maid Marian and the Evil Queen takes place sometime after "Ariel", and immediately before the events of "Snow Drifts". The Storybrooke events take place after "There's No Place Like Home".

=== In the Characters' Past ===
==== In the Enchanted Forest ====
The episode begins on a ship in the seas between Arendelle and the Enchanted Forest. Aware that the ship is sinking, Gerda's husband Agnarr finds her writing a letter to their daughters, Elsa and Anna, insisting that she needs to finish so that they can know the truth. Gerda and Agnarr toss the bottle into the sea just before the ship capsizes.

==== In Arendelle ====
Five years later, Anna and Elsa prepare for Anna's wedding to Kristoff when Elsa finds her mother's diary, which reveals that the reason for their "business" trip had to do with Elsa's seemingly uncontrollable ice powers. Elsa feels guilty that she may be the reason for their deaths, but Anna sets out to prove it wasn't, and meets with Grand Pabbie, the Troll King, to find out where their parents had gone. He reveals that they were headed to a land called Misthaven.

Later, Anna goes missing and Elsa seeks out Kristoff to help her find Anna. He reveals that she has set out to Misthaven in an effort to prove to Elsa that she was not the cause of her parents' demise. Kristoff also reveals that there is another name for Misthaven – the Enchanted Forest.

=== In Storybrooke ===
Elsa emerges from the barn where she entered Storybrooke. Grumpy (Lee Arenberg) and Sleepy (Faustino Di Bauda) are driving down the road when they almost run into Elsa; she freezes the truck before impact.

Emma Swan (Jennifer Morrison) leaves the diner to apologize to Regina (Lana Parrilla) for breaking up her and Robin Hood (Sean Maguire) — whom she inadvertently reunited with his deceased wife Marian (Christie Laing) after traveling back in time. Angry, she leaves to her office. Robin later talks to her that although his feelings for her were (and are) real, he made a vow to his wife and intends to keep it. Regina later makes her way to the mental hospital and releases Sidney Glass (Giancarlo Esposito), who she has kept there since the first curse broke. She tasks him to help her turn back time to kill Marian. She reimprisons him within the Magic Mirror, promising to release him once she accomplishes her goal, to show her the exact moment she captured Marian, only to be given a visual reminder of herself as the Evil Queen.

Grumpy tells Emma about the incident with Sleepy; she and Killian "Hook" Jones (Colin O'Donoghue) follow a trail of ice that Elsa left which leads to a warehouse. In order to protect herself, Elsa creates a snow monster which chases them (and others) out of the area. Emma, Hook, Robin Hood, and David Nolan (Josh Dallas) try to defeat the monster in the woods, only for all to get knocked unconscious. Marian also shoots an arrow at the monster, but it too failed to stop its advances. Regina shows up, and initially unwilling to help Marian, however, at the last second, Regina defeats the snow monster by burning it. Marian thanks Regina, with Regina welcoming her to Storybrooke. Afterwards, Regina disappears, still heartbroken, before Emma could talk to her about the recent developments. Emma uses the recent events as a way of avoiding Hook. Emma later tells Regina that despite her heartbreak, she will continue to make sure that everyone has a happy ending. Regina comes to a realization: everyone in Henry's Once Upon a Time book has a happy ending except the villain(s); she then tells Sidney to find "the writer" of the book so she can make her, the villain, have a happy ending.

Elsewhere, Belle (Emilie de Ravin) and Mr. Gold (Robert Carlyle) prepare for their honeymoon. Mr. Gold stops by his son Neal's grave to say his goodbyes. While there, he tells Neal that he plans on undoing a lie he told to Belle and secretly give her the real dagger that holds his power. The two honeymoon in a mansion, where Mr. Gold sneaks his dagger into her purse. Later that night, Mr. Gold finds a box sitting next to Belle's purse, and retrieves his dagger to open it, revealing a sorcerer's hat inside.

After the snow monster is defeated, Elsa finds out about Mr. Gold's pawn shop and breaks in. She finds Anna's necklace, and vows to find her sister.

== Cultural references ==
- The first half of season four is a continuation of the movie Frozen (2013), set two years after the events of the film, although it is not considered canon to the continuity of the Frozen franchise. This episode features the characters Elsa, Anna, their parents, Grand Pabbie, Kristoff and Sven, as well as their homeland Arendelle.
- The snow monster created by Elsa resembles Marshmallow from the original Frozen film.
- Belle and Mr. Gold dress in similar clothes as their counterparts in the Beauty and the Beast dance scene. The song playing during the episode's dance scene is an instrumental version of the same song featured in Beauty and the Beast on gramophone.
- The hat conjured by Mr. Gold is the same one Mickey Mouse wore in Fantasia's The Sorcerer's Apprentice short.
- The scene that shows Emma trying to convince a depressed Regina to come out by talking to her through the office door is a reference to the "Do You Want to Build a Snowman?" scene from Frozen, in which Anna attempts to convince Elsa to leave her isolation and spend time with her.
- The episode's title resembles that of the Charles Dickens novel A Tale of Two Cities.

== Reception ==
=== Ratings ===
The episode, thanks in part to the buildup around the Frozen storyline, saw its biggest numbers since the second season, as it pulled in a 3.5/11 among 18-49s with 9.47 million viewers tuning in, despite tough competition from NBC Sunday Night Football (which won the night), CBS' freshman hit Madam Secretary (which won the time period despite seeing a drop in viewers) and Fox's The Simpsons (who pulled in higher 18-49 numbers). It also saw a major increase in viewership numbers from the third season finale and surpassing the third season premiere. The show placed third in its timeslot, and sixth for the night.

In Canada, the premiere was watched by 1.606 million viewers, placing second for the night, falling behind CSI: Crime Scene Investigation. This marks an increase in viewership from the previous season premiere as well, which was watched by 1.285 million viewers.

=== Reviews ===
The premiere drew mainly positive reviews from critics, with most to all complementing the new characters. Christine Petralia of Buddy TV said the premiere "picks up right where last season left off and doesn't skip a beat. Frozen fans will be pumped that it looks like Elsa and Anna are going to stick around for a while as they search for answers about their parents' death. Meanwhile, a heartbroken Regina seeks out an old friend to help her "change the book" so she can finally get her happy ending. And as usual, Rumple can't seem to shake his obsession with power."

Amy Ratcliffe of IGN rated the episode 8 out of 10, signifying positive reviews, saying "The Season 4 premiere of Once showed the addition of Anna and Elsa works for the series, but it did more than focus on the sisters. Regina and Rumple both took strides forward, and that sends the signal that the front half of the season won't be all Frozen all the time - unlike the trip to Neverland last year." Philiana NG of The Hollywood Reporter said of the premiere "Once didn't veer too much from the backstory already established in last year's blockbuster, something co-creators Adam Horowitz and Eddy Kitsis were adamant about from the start. Instead of sprinkling on the Once twist, the portrayals of the Frozen characters were rather faithful, keeping true to the DNA of the Elsa [...], Anna [...], Kristoff [...], Grand Pabbie and even Sven that we knew on the big screen."

Patrick Gomez for People gave the premiere a positive review, saying "if the Season 4 premiere is any indication, Once has made it through its awkward teenage years and emerged a more nuanced and self-aware drama that just happens to be about witches and dwarfs – and, now, an ice princess from Arendelle." He then called the highlight of the episode "Lana Parrilla, who continues to pepper her Evil Queen with just the right amount of realism to make her deliciously wicked deeds seem justified, but Frozen is just the thing that has gotten Once really moving."

Brian Lowry of Variety gave the episode a generally positive review, saying ""Frozen" might not be able to glide through all the mazes that have taken "Once Upon A Time" from boundless promise to convolution, but incorporating characters from Disney's animated smash has made the ABC series feel a whole lot cooler. The season premiere is heavily driven by the arrival of Elsa, the movie's ice queen, in a continuing plot that will have her searching for her sister Anna. Frankly, it's still surprising the studio would risk such a formidable asset in this manner, but the stunt should help rekindle interest in a program whose happiest days appeared well behind it."

Gwen Ihnat of The A.V. Club gave the premiere a less positive review, giving it a C+ grade. She said "Unlike other seasons, which took us to places like Wonderland and Neverland and Oz, Arendelle does not have a massive, mythic past to draw from. There are no crocodiles with clocks in their stomachs, or literary silver slippers (to contrast with cinematic ruby ones), or tiny bottles that say "drink me". Instead, basically, there is one movie. A massive, record-breaking blockbuster, to be sure, but a single screen outing does not produce a relatively rich mythology from which to pull. [...] If the season four premiere (and all the promos for it) is any indication, this season will be Frozen-centric, and story supply is already running low. They already blew up the evil snowman, for God's sake (although I guess Elsa could just conjure up another one)."
