= Fall (Once Upon a Time) =

- Once Upon a Time episode
- Episode no.: Season 4 Episode 9
- Directed by: Mario Van Peebles
- Written by: Jane Espenson
- Production code: 409
- Original air date: November 30, 2014

Guest appearances
- Lee Arenberg as Dreamy/Grumpy/Leroy; Scott Michael Foster as Kristoff; Georgina Haig as Elsa; Elizabeth Lail as Anna; Sean Maguire as Robin Hood; Charles Mesure as Black Beard; Elizabeth Mitchell as the Snow Queen/Ingrid; Tyler Jacob Moore as Prince Hans; Keegan Connor Tracy as the Blue Fairy/Mother Superior; Raphael Alejandro as Roland; Nils Hohnestad as Franz; Marcus Rosner as Jurgen

Episode chronology
← Previous "Smash the Mirror"	Next → "Shattered Sight"
- Once Upon a Time season 4

"Fall" is the ninth episode of the fourth season of the American fantasy drama series Once Upon a Time, which aired on November 30, 2014.

In this episode, Belle and the fairies work on an antidote; Emma and Elsa search for Anna; and in Arendelle, Anna and Kristoff learn that 30 years have passed.

== Title card ==
Elsa and Anna's parents' sailing ship lies with Gerda's message in a bottle to her daughters on the bottom of the sea.

== Plot ==
=== Event chronology ===
The Arendelle events take place more than thirty years after "Smash the Mirror", and before "Heroes and Villains". The Enchanted Forest events take place concurrently with the events in Storybrooke, after the scene with Ariel and Prince Eric on Hangman's Island in "The Jolly Roger" and before "The Dark Swan". The Storybrooke events take place after "Smash the Mirror".

=== In Arendelle and at sea ===
After Ingrid's freezing spell on Arendelle wears off, Anna (Elizabeth Lail) and Kristoff (Scott Michael Foster) unfreeze and are trying to formulate a plan to find Elsa when Hans (Tyler Jacob Moore) and his brothers arrive to imprison them for assumed treason. Anna and Kristoff manage to escape and decide to go to the pirate Blackbeard (Charles Mesure), to look for the wishing star which they can use to free Elsa, who is trapped in a magic urn that Anna unintentionally caused when she was under the Spell of Shattered Sight in the previous episode, "Smash The Mirror".

They tell Black Beard that they will pay for the wishing star with his weight in gold, but Hans and his brothers suddenly appear and tell Anna and Kristoff that this a set-up. Hans then says that Arendelle has been frozen for 30 years, which surprises the couple. As they worry about what may have happened to Elsa and what the Snow Queen has done since then, they havs their hands tied with rope and are put in a trunk, which is then locked and dumped into the sea by Hans and Blackbeard so Hans and his brothers can take over Arendelle while Anna and Kristoff prepare for their fate.

Anna and Kristoff try to escape the trunk as it fills with water. Kristoff is able to free himself from the ropes and helps Anna with hers as she grieves. Starting to lose hope, she starts reciting her marriage vows because she wants to be married to Kristoff before she dies. Kristoff stops her, saying that he will only marry her after they escape and continues to comfort her. As the trunk is almost completely filled with water, they are suddenly brought to the beach in Storybrooke because Elsa wished for Anna on the Wishing Star, which is revealed to be Anna's necklace that Elsa gave her for her wedding in the first episode.

=== In Storybrooke ===
Mr. Gold (Robert Carlyle) approaches Ingrid (Elizabeth Mitchell) and asks that Belle (Emilie de Ravin) and Henry (Jared S. Gilmore) are spared from the Spell of Shattered Sight, so that he can leave town with them. She agrees to this proposal.

Meanwhile, others in Storybrooke try to figure out how to escape the Spell of Shattered Sight. Emma (Jennifer Morrison) suggests they leave town, but the ice wall is blocking every way out and when David tries to cut it down, new ice structures emerge to block his effort. However, a crack appears in the ice, which reveals Anna's necklace, and Elsa retrieves it. Belle and the fairies try to come up with a counter spell to reverse the curse effect. They can make one with either Anna's hair or her necklace, because she is now immune to the curse, as Ingrid had already cast the same curse over her. Elsa (Georgina Haig) takes her sister's necklace and attempts to find Anna using a locator spell, but it leads her and Emma to a solid wall in the tunnels under the library. Emma convinces Elsa that it is too risky to blast through. After making it back to the library, at the constant urging of Regina, and eventually Mary Margaret, Emma explains to Elsa that she needs to think about saving more lives than just Anna's. Elsa finally hands over the bag containing the necklace, but when Mother Superior opens it, it is revealed that Elsa has swapped out the necklace for rocks and has gone to find Anna on her own.

Gold orders Hook (Colin O'Donoghue) to stop the fairies and take their magic with the Sorcerer's Hat, so he can gain the power to free himself from the Dagger. Hook reluctantly does so, and captures all of the fairies. Gold then takes Belle to his shop and locks her in for her own protection.

Emma has decided to help Elsa search for Anna. The necklace leads them to the beach, but Anna is not there. Emma explains that magic is not always accurate, and that she needs to accept that Anna may no longer even be alive. Elsa weeps and wishes that she could know what happened to Anna and that she could see her again. Suddenly the necklace begins to glow. The necklace is revealed to be the Wishing Star. A water-filled trunk appears in the water and Anna and Kristoff emerge and Elsa and Anna reunite and embrace, and Gerda's message in the bottle for her daughters appears ashore on the beach, but goes unnoticed.

After a brief reunion, they run to Granny's to take Anna's hair to finish the counter spell, but find no one there, since Hook has captured the fairies. The four head to the sheriff's office, where they find Mary Margaret (Ginnifer Goodwin), David (Josh Dallas), and Neal. Mary Margaret hands Emma the keys to the jail, and says to lock her and David in separate cells, as they don't want to hurt themselves or anyone else when Ingrid's curse takes effect. Emma reluctantly does so, and takes her baby brother to protect him. Hook comes in, stating that he had to see Emma one last time and the two tearfully kiss goodbye, before Hook leaves to chain himself to a dock at the marina.

In the mayor's office, Regina (Lana Parrilla) tells Henry to stay in her office and to not let anyone in or out. She seals the door to her office and runs into Robin (Sean Maguire), who pleads he is not afraid of her and wants to stay by her side. She replies that no one will be safe when this spell hits, then runs to her vault and seals herself in.

The spell falls upon the town, an indigo thunderstorm covers the town, and mirror shards begin to rain down from the sky as Hook looks on from the docks. Mary Margaret's and David's eyes frost over and "crack," and they let go of each other's hands and begin looking menacingly at each other.

== Reception ==
The episode received mixed to positive reviews.

Christine Orlando of TV Fanatic gave the episode a positive review, rating it 4.8 out of 5. She said, "It was quite a relief to see Anna and Elsa finally reunited and the necklace being the wishing star was a fun twist. Unfortunately, getting Anna to Storybrooke proved to be too little too late."

Amy Ratcliffe of IGN gave the episode a moderate review, saying the episode "delivered on the Frozen storyline front and brought the reunion we've been dying to see, but some scenes seemed created to fill time. They stretched to make connections with Blackbeard and spent too much energy trying to make Hans seem dangerous. However, characters such as Regina and Snow White had some nice dialogue and development. It would be a pleasant change to see the story turns back towards them instead of the villain of the moment." Ratcliffe gave the episode a 6.7 rating out of 10.
