= Morgan Beggs =

Canadian television director

- Other name: Morgan James Beggs
- Occupation: Television director
- Years active: 1977–present

Morgan Beggs is a Canadian television director.

He is known for his work on The WB/The CW's Smallville and on the ABC fairytale series Once Upon a Time.

== Career ==
Beggs began his career as a child actor in 1977s Skip Tracer, the only acting credit he has received. He first worked as a second assistant director on 21 Jump Street. He went on to serve in the same capacity on Timecop and Gold Diggers: The Secret of Bear Mountain. He has served as first assistant director on such series as The Commish, The X-Files, Millennium, Beggars and Choosers, Dark Angel, Tru Calling, Reunion, Men in Trees, The 4400. The Killing, The Secret Circle, Fear the Walking Dead, Dead of Summer, and A Series of Unfortunate Events; and on films Screwed, Head Over Heels, Spooky House, Scooby-Doo 2: Monsters Unleashed, Elektra, The Exorcism of Emily Rose, Ramona and Beezus, and Monster Trucks.

He first directed an episode of television on Dark Angel. He has also directed for Kyle XY, The 4400, and Flash Gordon. Beggs seminal achievements lie with the Superman prequel series Smallville, which ran for 10 seasons; and the Disney produced Once Upon a Time. He served as 1st AD on 35 installments of Smallville, including the 2011 finale, and directed "Bulletproof", "Pandora" and "Collateral". On Once, Beggs has 1st assistant directed over 40 episodes, while directing the fourth season, Frozen installment "Rocky Road".
