= White Out (Once Upon a Time) =

- Once Upon a Time episode
- Episode no.: Season 4 Episode 2
- Directed by: Ron Underwood
- Written by: Jane Espenson
- Production code: 402
- Original air date: October 5, 2014

Guest appearances
- Lee Arenberg as Leroy/Grumpy; Michael Coleman as Happy; Beverley Elliott as Granny; Georgina Haig as Ice Queen/Elsa; Elizabeth Lail as Anna; Robin Weigert as Bo Peep; Gabrielle Rose as Ruth; Sean Owen Roberts as Ruffian; Elizabeth Mitchell as Sarah Fisher

Episode chronology
← Previous "A Tale of Two Sisters"	Next → "Rocky Road"
- Once Upon a Time season 4

"White Out" is the second episode of the fourth season of the American fantasy drama series Once Upon a Time, which aired on October 5, 2014.

In this episode David Nolan, Captain Hook, and Elsa try to save Emma Swan's life, while flashbacks show David's past with Anna.

== Title card ==
A giant wall of ice appears beyond the forest.

== Plot ==
=== Event chronology ===
The Enchanted Forest events take place before "The Apprentice" and "Heartless", and after Anna leaves Arendelle for the Enchanted Forest in "A Tale of Two Sisters". The story also takes place several years after the Snow Queen and her sisters visit the Enchanted Forest in "The Snow Queen", and five years after Gerda perishes at sea in "A Tale of Two Sisters". The Storybrooke events take place after "A Tale of Two Sisters"

=== In the Characters' Past ===
Back in the Enchanted Forest prior to the first curse, Anna (under the alias of Joan) helps David − future Prince Charming − fight off a warlord called Bo Peep (Robin Weigert), who is threatening to take the land and their flock of sheep from his mother Ruth (Gabrielle Rose).

While training him through sword fighting, Anna encourages David to resist becoming Bo Peep's slave and a coward. David then explains to Anna his childhood memories of his father's alcoholism and constant disappearing until he overdosed. The next day, David finds Anna missing; Bo Peep has branded her with her shepherd's crook. Bo Peep intimidates David after the deadline for his dues are up; then, using the fighting skills he learned from Anna, David defeats Bo and her guards. David grabs her crook and finds Anna in a barn. He then thanks Anna for helping him fight and encouraging him to live his own life.

Afterwards, Anna asks Ruth about the magic in the land. Ruth tells her of a dangerous wizard who might be able to help her in her quest for magic, and that she will write down the name for her. David then gives Anna his prized horse as a token of his appreciation. Riding away, Anna reads the name aloud, which is revealed to be Rumpelstiltskin. After Anna says his name, it is revealed that Rumpelstiltskin is watching her.

=== In Storybrooke ===
While trying to find her sister Anna (Elizabeth Lail), Elsa (Georgina Haig) blocks the exit from Storybrooke with a giant ice wall, which also cuts power to the town. Emma Swan (Jennifer Morrison), David Nolan (Josh Dallas), and Killian "Hook" Jones (Colin O'Donoghue) go to investigate the wall, while the townspeople rely on Mary Margaret (Ginnifer Goodwin) to lead them, since Regina (Lana Parrilla) has isolated herself from everyone — which worries her son Henry Mills (Jared S. Gilmore). Emma meets Elsa and tries talking to her; but Elsa is soon startled by David and Hook, and she blocks them off by forming a thick ice wall between them, trapping her and Emma.

Elsa then gives Emma an ultimatum: either give her Anna, or stay in the ice cave and risk having Storybrooke frozen over. Emma then realizes that Elsa is not in control of her powers; her ultimatum was not a threat; it was a warning, as Anna helps Elsa control her powers. Emma begins to relate to her by telling her that she has magic as well. While trying to present her powers (after explaining her history), Emma begins to suffer from hypothermia. Elsa apologizes for trapping her; Emma eventually falls unconscious due to the intense cold.

David and Hook ask Mr. Gold (Robert Carlyle) for assistance in saving Emma; it is at Gold's shop that David finds out who Anna is. David and Hook then interrogate Bo Peep, now a butcher and owner of a meat shop called "The Chop Shop." As Bo Peep is about to use her cleaver to chop off David as revenge for defeating her back in their previous lives, Hook clutches on to her hand she was using the cleaver with. Hook finds her crook, and hopes to use it to find Anna. Hook then gets a message from the walkie-talkie that Emma is freezing to death. David then tells Elsa that they have a way of finding Anna. David tells Elsa that despite her being able to survive the cold, she has to live more than she already is: alone. Elsa then finds the strength to control her powers and breach the ice wall. Afterwards, while Emma recovers, David promises Elsa that they will find Anna, using Bo's crook. Through the crook, they can hear a heartbeat, indicating that although they do not know where Anna is, she is in fact alive.

Elsewhere, Grumpy (Lee Arenberg), Happy (Michael Coleman) and Granny (Beverley Elliott) constantly nag Mary Margaret to help restart the power, to which she finally tells them to leave her alone, as she is already struggling as a new mother. Despite her anger and stress, she continues to try and fix the power by herself. She manages to restart it by starting up a backup fuel supply line.

Later, a determined Henry goes to Regina's door and knocks, shouting that he knows she can hear him and that he will not give up on his mother. She is touched by this, and after a while answers the door and tearfully embraces her son.

Elsa tries to bring down the ice wall, but to no avail. It is then revealed that another woman with similar powers is in Storybrooke. She is working at an ice-cream shop, and her powers are revealed when she freezes cream into ice cream using magic.

== Production ==
Jane Espenson wrote for this episode.

Rumors online have hinted at a potential friendship between Jennifer Morrison's character Emma Swan and Georgina Haig's Frozen character Elsa. Haig said "Elsa is very confused and makes friends with Emma. They bond over the fact that they both can't control their magic. But she's still dealing with a lot of the problems that she was dealing with in Frozen. She can't control her powers and ends up hurting people without meaning to."

A preview featured a scene in which Elsa and Emma are trapped in a closed off ice cave. The producers planned to film the scene in a meat locker in order to capture the characters' breath on screen; however, according to Morrison, "they realized that they [shouldn't] see Elsa's breath because she isn't affected by the cold, so that wouldn't make any sense. They would still have to CGI out her breath and keep my breath. And also, that would've been horrible to actually be freezing all day. I was very, very grateful that they changed their minds about that." The scene was instead filmed on a stage outside in Vancouver with the air conditioning blasting. Morrison said:

We were on stage, and the air conditioning couldn't keep up. And we had to turn the air conditioning off during the take anyway. We were on the green-screen stage, and it was like 110 degrees in there. I was sweating through t-shirts every take because you shiver to keep warm, but I was already so hot. And then I was fake-shivering through every take for 16 hours. I was so sweaty and gross! [Laughs] I couldn't have been hotter while I was 'freezing to death.'

Morrison then further elaborated on Swan's relationship with Colin O'Donoghue's character Killian "Hook" Jones, saying:

They've been on great adventures and they've traveled through worlds, they've traveled through time. He's given up his ship for her, he's proven that he's someone who really continues to show up for her. Like Emma, he's made some mistakes in life, some terrible mistakes in life, and has worked very hard to redeem them. I think she relates to the fact that she's also made mistakes in her life and she's worked very hard to redeem them. So they do have that in common. She believes in that part of him the same way she believes in that part of herself. So there is definitely an openness to her when they do finally decide to go on this date.

== Cultural references ==
- This episode features the titular character Snow Queen from the fairytale of The Snow Queen.
- Anna goes by the name of Joan. This is a reference to Anna's line, "Hang in there, Joan", during the "Do You Want to Build a Snowman?" sequence in Frozen.
- In the ice cave, Emma asks Elsa if the cold is bothering her. Elsa says, "It's never bothered me", a reference to the "Let It Go" sequence from Frozen. In the song, Elsa sings the line, "The cold never bothered me anyway."
- When Ruth gives Anna a sandwich, she says "I love sandwiches!", which is a reference to the "Love Is an Open Door" sequence from Frozen in which Anna and Hans sing, "We finish each other's sandwiches."

== Reception ==
=== Ratings ===
The outing, despite losing four-tenths of its audience from the previous episode, placed a 3.2/9 among 18-49s, making it the evening's most watched scripted program during the 8-9 pm hour, with 8.78 million viewers tuning in, placing it second in that category behind Madam Secretary on CBS. It was also ABC's most-watched program, and the top scripted program overall for the night as it placed second behind NBC's Sunday Night Football.

In Canada, it delivered 1.818 million viewers, making it the night's second most-watched program.

=== Reviews ===
The episode was met with good reviews, but were mixed on adding another villainous character in Bo Peep.

Amy Ratcliffe of IGN rated the episode 6.9 out of 10, saying "The Frozen portions of tonight's Once worked. We saw more of how Elsa and Anna have developed since Elsa's “Let It Go” phase, and Elsa got over her fears of Storybrooke's citizens and is controlling her powers. The happenings in the fairy tale realm with Bo Peep and David were rather silly though and brought the story down."

Den of Geek gave it 4.5 stars, saying "Sometimes I worry that the writers of Once Upon a Time have developed the technology to record my innermost desires without my knowledge or consent. I am not paranoid, I am just proposing a logical supposition based on the fact that tonight they had Deadwood’s Calamity Jane playing Little Bo Peep, cockney warlord. While I can’t, admittedly, say that this was a specific dream of mine, seeing it on screen tonight made it abundantly clear that this was something my heart needed to witness."

TV Fanatic gave the episode 4.4 out of 5 stars.
