= Lily (Once Upon a Time) =

- Once Upon a Time episode
- Episode no.: Season 4 Episode 19
- Directed by: Ralph Hemecker
- Written by: Andrew Chambliss & Dana Horgan
- Production code: 419
- Original air date: April 26, 2015

Guest appearances
- Kristin Bauer van Straten as Maleficent; Agnes Bruckner as Lilith "Lily" Page/Starla; Patrick Fischler as Isaac Heller/The Author; Christie Laing as Marian/Disguised Zelena; Rebecca Mader as Zelena/The Wicked Witch of the West; Sean Maguire as Robin Hood; Timothy Webber as The Apprentice; Nicole Muñoz as Young Lily Page; Abby Ross as Young Emma Swan; Cameron Bancroft as Bill; Kendall Cross as Katie; Phil Granger as Landlord; Sidney Shapiro as Max; Parker Magnuson as Zach; Zoey Stewart as Brunette girl; Jonathan Adams as Merlin/The Sorcerer (voice); Carlton Cuse as TV News Reporter (voice)

Episode chronology
| ← Previous "Sympathy for the De Vil" | Next → "Mother" |
- Once Upon a Time season 4

"Lily" is the nineteenth episode of the fourth season of the American fantasy drama series Once Upon a Time, which aired on April 26, 2015.

When Emma Swan discovers that a former friend from her past, Lily, is Maleficent's long lost daughter, she embarks on a quest to find her and bring her back to Storybrooke in order to reunite her with Maleficent, and Regina teams up with her in an effort to warn Robin Hood about Zelena, but the two are about to face what awaits them outside Storybrooke. Inside Storybrooke, Gold finds himself dealing with Belle, and back in Emma's past, her friendship with Lily after she is placed in a foster home could threaten their future.

== Title card ==
Emma Swan's yellow Volkswagen Beetle drives through the Enchanted Forest.

== Plot ==
=== In the Characters' Past ===
==== The Enchanted Forest ====
In the Enchanted Forest, the Apprentice starts consulting with the Sorcerer, who demands that the Author (Isaac) can never be allowed to change fate again, after he manipulated the Apprentice into sending Maleficent's daughter, Lily, to the real world after transferring Emma's potential for darkness to the child.

==== The Land Without Magic ====
In 1999 Mankato, Minnesota, teenage Emma is grabbing a sleeping bag from the garage for a camping trip with her new foster family, when she finds her friend Lily hiding, saying that she's in big trouble. Lily then invokes the "friends forever" clause to get Emma's help. Before she can decline or accept, Emma's foster father appears and invites Lily to stay for dinner, but when Emma's father brings up the subject of how they met, Lily lies by saying that they knew each other through foster care. Emma pulls Lily aside afterwards and tells her she doesn't want to lie to her new family, only to see a news report on television about authorities searching for shoplifters, and Lily is among the suspects identified.

The news has now made Emma furious and now wants Lily to leave immediately, but Lily says that she just can't help it because she always does "bad" things; she then begs Emma for help with just one more thing, which is to retrieve a special necklace. Later that night, Emma follows through with getting the necklace, but Lily pulls a fast one on Emma by stealing money from Emma's parents and runs away. When Emma returns home, she discovers that Lily stole the money her parents had saved for the vacation. Emma's parents also called Emma's social worker and discovered how they met, and that Lily is a known criminal. The parents are now upset with Emma for not telling them about the true nature of their relationship and allowing such a person into their home; the actions result in Emma's foster father asking if she "endangered our children". Despite Emma's foster mother assuring her that he didn't mean it, Emma leaves the home, sad and upset. Later that night, Lily catches up with a now furious Emma at a bus stop, Emma throws Lily's necklace at her and tells her to go away, now extremely cross at her for ruining her chance to have a family. But Lily claims that no matter what she does, everything goes wrong and adding that her "whole life is darkness," but when Emma is around it gets brighter. Lily then begs Emma to stay in her life and help, but a bitter Emma leaves her, saying she is better off alone and that she's done helping her.

Lily's future would later come to light as Lily unknowingly sits next to the Apprentice on the bus after she boards, where he starts to tell Lily that he knows everything about her and can explain why her life is so miserable. He believes he owes the truth to her.

=== In Storybrooke ===
It has been several days since Cruella's death as Isaac and Gold mourn her death, but Gold is quick to point out that the time has come to start moving on to their next plot. Meanwhile, at the diner, Emma wonders how they will stop Gold now that her heart is starting to change, when all of a sudden Maleficent shows up and says that she is offering her help, now that they all have a common enemy in Gold. Maleficent tells Emma about her daughter, who is alive and named Lily, which prompts Emma to race off towards the library after she hears the name.

Emma immediately does some research and uncovers the truth that the woman, Lilith "Lily" Page, is not only Maleficent's daughter, but was once the childhood friend of Emma, who also discovers that fate has controlled her life down to the finest detail, which includes influencing the one friend she ever had. Regina then suggests that it is time to turn the tables on fate, and proposes that the two travel to New York together, giving them the opportunity to help each other, with Regina hoping to warn Robin Hood about Zelena, while Emma hopes to find and reunite with Lily in order to redeem her parents. As they prepare to leave Storybrooke, Emma and Regina say their goodbyes to everyone, though Emma is still mad at Mary Margaret and David for lying to her.

With Emma and Regina out of town, Gold finds the opportunity to find Belle's heart, as it can not leave town. He finds Will after finishing his date with Belle, and tells him that Regina took her heart and then threatens Will by demanding that he help him steal it back from Regina's office. Meanwhile, Mary Margaret and David visit Maleficent and ask for her forgiveness, but she responds to the couple that the real person they need to seek forgiveness from is Lily, since Maleficent has made it clear that she will never forgive them. Hours later, Gold puts his next plan into motion as he seeks out Maleficent in pursuit of Belle's heart, but Maleficent has decided not to be part of his plot upon visiting the Mayor's office as Regina has placed a protection spell so he can't enter the office, but Gold used the distraction to allow Will to sneak in through the window and retrieve Belle's heart. After Gold leaves, Maleficent immediately texts Regina.

As Will brings Belle's heart back to her, he finally gets her attention as Gold enters the room to explain that he must stop hurting her as his heart has grown blacker and learns that he will die faster if he does not stop. Gold then restores the heart back into Belle, and as he leaves, essentially gives Will his blessing with Belle. As Gold walked out of the store, Will grabs Belle's hand but she takes it away while staring at door, seemingly showing signs that she wanted to go after him.

=== In the Land Without Magic ===
As Emma and Regina arrive in Lowell, Massachusetts, the two visit an apartment that was the most recent address that Lily once lived at, but the landlord who heard them knock on her door says she died in a car crash and adds insult to their injury by claiming that no one really misses her. Sensing that he is lying, Emma starts to snap and prepares to attack him, but Regina barely holds her back from doing so. Hours later, Emma and Regina are back on the road, when they spot a wolf in the middle of the road and just like Emma's first arrival in Storybrooke is run off the highway and it blows a tire. Emma is now convinced that this is happening all over again, only to have Regina telling Emma that she's putting too much faith in fate. Moments later, Emma and Regina stop to get a meal at diner nearby, and in a surprise shocking twist Emma quickly identifies a waitress named "Starla" as her long lost friend, Lily.

Emma and Lily begin to confront each other outside of the diner. Lily is stunned that Emma would track her down based on the birthmark on her wrist as proof, even as Emma tries to explain that there's a higher force at power here that has kept them in each other's lives and forced Lily's many bad decisions. Lily then tells Emma that she does not believe her and refuses her offer to help. She also tells Emma that she is married and has a daughter, only to walk over to the young girl who just got off a school bus and asks her to pretend to be her daughter in exchange for a free week of burgers. This leads Emma to be suspicious of Lily and follow her to her home, where they find a wall filled with newspaper clippings and clues about Storybrooke; it turns out that Lily knows everything about its existence, and is plotting revenge on the people responsible. The two then hear a car burning rubber (Emma's VW) and leaving the place. They believe Lily is ready to carry out her plot as the Snow Queen's scroll is inside, so Emma finds a monkey wrench, then smashes the window of another vehicle and the ladies race off after Lily until they catch up with her and corner her. When Lily threatens Emma by vowing to kill Mary Margaret and David, she and Emma start fighting (causing the skies to darken and an electrical strike that takes out the headlights on Emma's car) until Emma ultimately starts pointing a gun at Lily, who dares her to shoot, since all she ever does is ruin things anyway and adds that decisions are inherently part of her. Realizing that killing Lily would become a major line that would draw Emma into darkness, Regina tells her to lower the gun and Emma does just that.

With the hatchet now buried, Lily joins Emma and Regina and they race their way towards New York City to warn Robin Hood, as Regina has now learned that the leverage she has over Gold, Belle's heart, has been restored back in Belle by Gold, putting Robin in more danger. As they reach the apartment, Regina tells Robin the truth about Zelena pretending to be Marian but Robin doesn't believe her, until "Marian" shows up. Regina attempts to expose her but Robin still doesn't believe her and shouts at her, telling her, he's moved on. Once "Marian" arrives, she keeps up the ruse at the beginning but eventually reveals to everyone by transforming herself back to Zelena, shocking Robin, who suddenly shocks Regina, Emma and Lily with another surprise: Zelena is now pregnant with his child.

== Reception ==
=== Ratings ===
The episode increased from the previous two episodes, as it posted a 1.7/5 among 18-49s with 5.21 million viewers tuning in, retaining its lead among scripted programs in the 8 p.m. timeslot but was tied in terms of rating numbers with Secrets & Lies, which followed this show in the 9 p.m. slot.

=== Reviews ===
The episode was met with mixed to positive reviews.

Hilary Busis of Entertainment Weekly noted "It's a good thing “Lily” ended with something of a bombshell—because otherwise, tonight's highly anticipated installment felt like a bit of an anticlimax. For any other show, an episode that has a plot you can easily explain in a sentence (Emma and Regina leave Storybrooke to track down Maleficent's daughter; they do) wouldn't necessarily be cause for concern. On Once, though—which is at its best when it's being crazy-go-nuts-bonkers—these sorts of hours tend to land with a whimper instead of a bang."

Amy Ratcliffe of IGN said of the episode, "The search for Lily and the memories it brought to the surface didn’t make for a stirring or emotional episode. Regina serving as Emma's life coach kept the primary plot afloat, but overall, Emma is going dark side too quickly. The build should be more gradual. Also, Emma really needs to stop saying that she knows when people are lying." Ratcliffe gave the episode a 6.5 rating out of 10.

In a review from Rickey.org, Nick Roman cites "“Lily” suggests nature and nurture go hand in hand, and the result is an engrossing episode."
