= Pascale Hutton =

Canadian actress (born 1979)

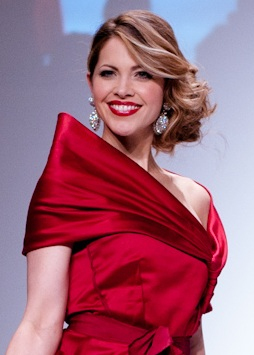
- Hutton in February 2012
- Born: 14 June 1979 (age 47); Creston, British Columbia, Canada
- Education: University of Alberta
- Occupation: Actress
- Years active: 2003–present
- Spouse: Danny Dorosh (m. 2002)
- Children: 2

Pascale Hutton (born June 14, 1979) is a Canadian actress. She is known for television roles such as FBI special agent Abby Corrigan on the science fiction-fantasy series Sanctuary, Krista Ivarson on the rural airline drama series Arctic Air, and Rosemary LeVeaux Coulter on the Hallmark Channel series When Calls the Heart.

== Biography ==
Hutton was born in Creston, British Columbia. She attended the conservatory acting program at the University of Alberta in Edmonton.

She married Danny Dorosh in 2002; the couple have two sons together.

== Filmography ==
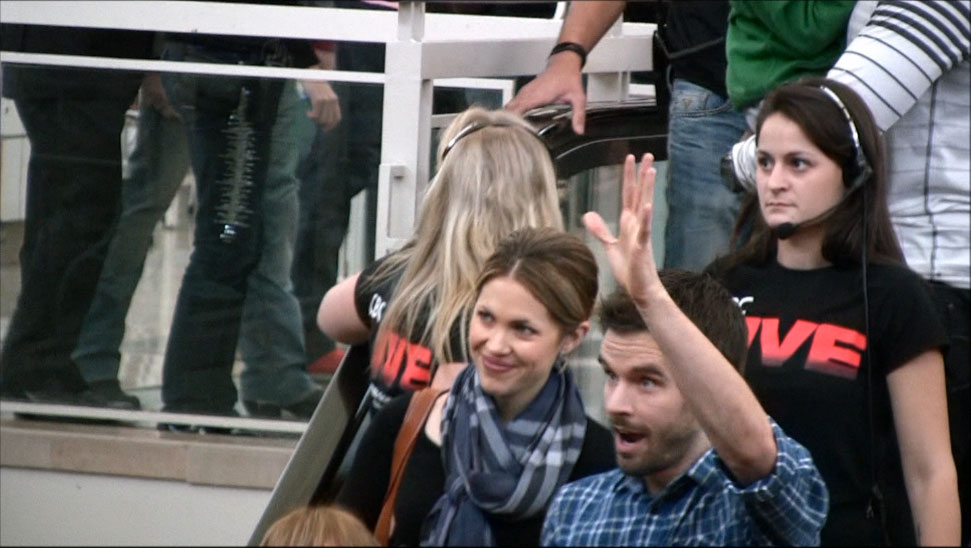
Hutton at a CBC Live event, Sherway Gardens.

=== Film ===
Year	Title	Role	Notes
2004	Ginger Snaps 2: Unleashed	Beth-Ann	
2005	A Simple Curve	Lee	
2005	Fantastic Four	Nightclub Girlfriend	Extended version only
2005	Chaos	Pretty Waitress	
2008	The Art of War II: Betrayal	Autumn	Direct-to-video
2008	Shred	Danielle	
2009	Revenge of the Boarding School Dropouts	Danielle	Direct-to-video
2009	Tornado Valley	Ellie	
2010	Cats & Dogs: The Revenge of Kitty Galore	Jackie	
2010	Badass Thieves	Kate	Short film
2011	Afghan Luke	Elita	
2015	The Unspoken	Jeanie	
2017	S.W.A.T.: Under Siege	Carley	Direct-to-video
2023	Double Life	Sharon Setter	

=== Television ===
Year	Title	Role	Notes
2003	Hollywood Wives: The New Generation	Nikki Roman	Television film (CBS)
2004	Chicks with Sticks	Charlene Manski	Television film
2004	The Clinic	Sarah	Television film (Animal Planet)
2004	The Days	Megan	"Day 1,403"
2004	Dead Like Me	Amina	"The Shallow End"
2004	Life as We Know It	Kelly	"Pilot"
2005	Stargate: Atlantis	First Officer Trebal	"Aurora"
2005	Reunion	Heather	"1988", "1989"
2005	Smallville	Karen Gallagher	"Ageless"
2006	Smallville	Raya	"Zod", "Fallout"
2006	Disaster Zone: Volcano in New York	Karen Barbarini	Television film (SyFy)
2006	The Collector	Naomi Grant	"The Media Baron"
2006	The Evidence	Jocelyn Gallo	"Five Little Indians"
2006	Presumed Dead	C.C. Woodruff	Television film (Lifetime)
2006	The Dead Zone	Karen Tomlin	"Forbidden Fruit"
2006	Psych	Katarina McCallum	"Pilot"
2007	The Singles Table	Georgia	"Pilot"
2007	Traveler	Kim Doherty	Main role
2007	The 4400	Abigail Hunnicutt	"Ghost in the Kitchen", "The Great Leap Forward"
2007	Reaper	Taylor	"Love, Bullets and Blacktop"
2007	Intelligence	Julianna Vejzna	Recurring role
2008	Trial by Fire	Taryn	Television film (Lifetime)
2008–2009	Flashpoint	Kira Marlowe	Recurring role
2009	Tornado Valley	Ellie Wilson	Television film
2009	Supernatural	Lia	"The Curious Case of Dean Winchester"
2009–2015	Royal Pains	Nikki	"Pilot", "Lending a Shoulder"
2010	Elopement	Jamie Butler	Television film (ION)
2010	Rookie Blue	Det. Jess Erico	"Broad Daylight"
2010	A Family Thanksgiving	Becca	Television film (Hallmark)
2010–2011	Sanctuary	Abby Corrigan	Recurring role
2010–2012	Fringe	Sally Clark	"Over There: Part 1", "Worlds Apart"
2011	Behemoth	Emily Allington	Television film (SyFy)
2012	Continuum	Alicia Fuentes	"The Politics of Time"
2012–2014	Arctic Air	Krista Ivarson	Main role
2014	Recipe for Love	Nan	Television film (Hallmark)
2014	Once Upon a Time	Queen Gerda	"A Tale of Two Sisters", "The Snow Queen"
2014–present	When Calls the Heart	Rosemary Coulter (LeVeaux)	Regular role
2016	Summer of Dreams	Denise	Television films (Hallmark)
2017	The Perfect Bride	Molly White	Television films (Hallmark)
2018	The Perfect Bride: Wedding Bells	Molly White	Television films (Hallmark)
2018	Wedding of Dreams	Denise	Television films (Hallmark)
2019	My One and Only	Stephanie	Television films (Hallmark)
2019	When Hope Calls	Rosemary Coulter	Season 1, Episode 2
2021	You Had Me at Aloha	Paige Marshall	Television film (Hallmark); Also executive producer
2022	We Wish You a Married Christmas	Lauren	Television film (Hallmark)
2023	Fourth Down and Love	Erin	Television film (Hallmark)
2023	Notes of Autumn	Isabelle	Television film (Hallmark)
2024	Nelly Knows Mysteries: A Fatal Engagement	Nelly Parker	Television film (Hallmark)
2025	The Wish Swap	Coach Gloria	Television film (Hallmark)
2025	The Christmas Cup	Rosemary	Television film (Hallmark)
2026	Nelly Knows Mysteries: All Manners of Murder	Nelly Parker	Television film (Hallmark)
2026	Mr. & Mrs. Christmas		Television film (Hallmark)

=== Online ===
Year	Title	Role
2014	Arctic Air - VIP Lounge	Krista Ivarson

== Awards and nominations ==
Year	Award	Category	Work	Result	Ref.
2006	Leo Awards	Best Lead Performance by a Female: Feature Length Drama	A Simple Curve	Nominated	
2008	Gemini Awards	Best Performance by an Actress in a Guest Role: Dramatic Series	Intelligence, episode: "The Heat Is On"	Won	
2012	Leo Awards	Best Guest Performance by a Female: Dramatic Series	Sanctuary, episode: "Fugue"	Won	
2013	Leo Awards	Best Lead Performance by a Female: Dramatic Series	Arctic Air, episode: "Wildfire"	Nominated	
2015	Leo Awards	Best Lead Performance by a Female: Dramatic Series	When Calls the Heart, episode: "Rules Of Engagement"	Nominated	
2020	Leo Awards	Best Lead Performance by a Female: Television Movie	When Calls the Heart, special: "Home For Christmas"	Nominated	
