= Christie Laing =

Canadian actress

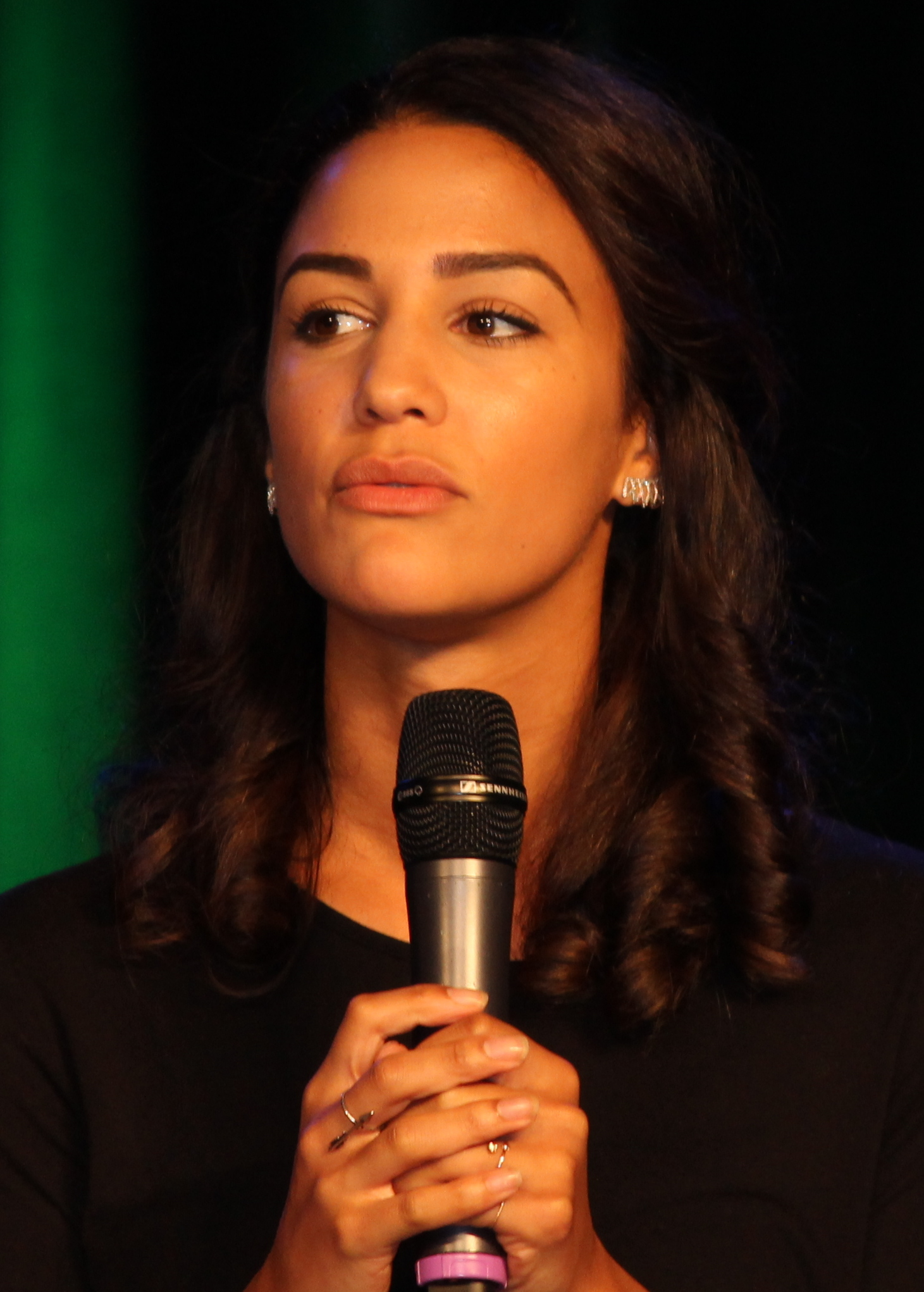
- Laing at Magic City ComicCon 2015
- Born: April 10, 1985 (age 41); Vancouver, British Columbia, Canada
- Occupation: Actress
- Years active: 2000–present

Christie Laing (born April 10, 1985) is a Canadian actress. She is best known for playing the role of Carly Diggle in Arrow, Marian in Once Upon a Time and Michelle Hunter in iZombie.

== Early life ==
Laing was born in Vancouver and grew up in White Rock, British Columbia. She is of Belizean and British descent, Laing was a flight attendant and runner up to Miss Richmond. Laing and her two younger sisters, Nikki and Paige, grew up dancing until she focused on her acting career and changed her priorities.

== Filmography ==
=== Films ===
Year	Title	Role	Notes
2000	2gether	2gether Fan	TV movie
2004	Going the Distance	Sexy Girl	
2004	Sudbury	Rachel	TV movie
2006	Scary Movie 4	Chingy's Girl #2	
2006	Just a Phase	Amy	TV movie
2008	Sea Beast	Erin	TV movie
2008	The Mrs. Clause	Salesgirl	TV movie
2010	Tucker & Dale vs. Evil	Naomi	
2010	Percy Jackson & the Olympians: The Lightning Thief	Aphrodite Girl	
2010	Lying to Be Perfect	Tish	TV movie
2010	The Boy Who Cried Werewolf	Tiffany Whit	TV movie
2011	A Fairly Odd Movie: Grow Up, Timmy Turner!	Janice	TV movie
2013	Nearlyweds	Anna	TV movie
2013	Window Wonderland	Megan	TV movie
2014	June in January	Tessa Williams	TV movie
2015	Wish Upon a Christmas	Rachel	TV movie
2015	Angel of Christmas	Hayley	TV movie
2016	The Mistletoe Promise	Holly	TV movie

=== Television ===
Year	Title	Role	Notes
2000	Freedom		1 episode
2004	Romeo!	Marin	1 episode
2004	The Days	Harris	2 episodes: "Day 1,412" (season 1: episode 1) "Day 1,370: Part 1" (season 1: episode 5)
2004	Dead Like Me	Cheerleader #2	1 episode
2004-06	Smallville	Mindy/Katherine Goodwin	2 episodes: "Truth" (season 3: episode 18) "Cyborg" (season 5: episode 15)
2005-06	Supernatural	Taylor/Johnson's Demon	2 episodes: "Hook Man" (season 1: episode 7) "Crossroad Blues" (season 2: episode 8)
2005-07	The 4400	Isabelle	2 episodes: "Mommy's Bosses" (season 2: episode 12) "The Marked" (season 4: episode 6)
2007	Whistler	Keltie	1 episode
2008	Kyle XY	Kenzie	1 episode
2008	Fear Itself	Kelly	1 episode: In Sickness and in Health
2009	The Assistants	Woman	1 episode
2010	Human Target	Intern	1 episode
2010	Tower Prep	Female monitor	1 episode
2012-13	Arrow	Carly Diggle	Season 1 (recurring; 6 episodes)
2012	Primeval: New World	Frosh Leader	1 episode
2013	Emily Owens, M.D.	Another Nurse	1 episode
2013-14	Once Upon a Time	Marian	Season 2-3 (guest; 3 episodes); Season 4 (recurring; 2 episodes)
2014-15	Once Upon a Time	Zelena/Wicked Witch of the West	Season 3 (guest; 1 episode); Season 4 (recurring; 5 episodes)
2015	UnREAL	Shamiqua	Season 1 (recurring; 8 episodes)
2018-2019	iZombie	Michelle	Seasons 4-5 (7 episodes)
