= Who's Alice =

- Once Upon a Time in Wonderland episode
- Episode no.: Season 1 Episode 6
- Directed by: Ron Underwood
- Written by: Jerome Schwartz
- Original air date: November 21, 2013

Guest appearances
- Jonny Coyne as Dr. Lydgate; Brian George as Old prisoner; Shaun Smyth as Edwin; Heather Doerksen as Sarah; Matty Finochio as Tweedledee; Hesham Hammoud as Ghazi; John Prowse as Carpenter; Sean Owen Roberts as Thief #2; Kylie Rogers as Millie; Dallas Sauer as Mr. Darcy; John R. Taylor as Old Peddler; Kerry van der Griend as Thief #1; Troy Young as Painter

Episode chronology
← Previous "Heart of Stone"	Next → "Bad Blood"

"Who's Alice" is the sixth episode of the Once Upon a Time spin-off series Once Upon a Time in Wonderland.

== Plot ==
While traveling through the Black Forest to get to the recently escaped Cyrus, Alice ends up in Boro Grove where she starts to lose her memory as the Knave of Hearts tries to get her to leave Boro Grove. While Cyrus evades the Red Queen, Jafar heads to Victorian England with the White Rabbit in order to find the ones that Alice cares about. Flashbacks reveal what happened after Alice had presumed Cyrus died where it was shown that her father Edwin had remarried a woman named Sarah resulting in Alice having a half-sister named Millie.

== Production ==
Ron Underwood was the writer for the episode, while Jerome Schwartz was its director.

== Reception ==
=== Ratings ===
The episode was watched by 3.53 million American viewers, and received an 18-49 rating/share of 0.9/3, roughly the same as the previous episode. The show placed fifth in its timeslot and thirteenth for the night.

=== Critical reception ===
Amy Ratcliffe of IGN gave the episode a 6.3 out of 10, giving it a mixed review. She said "The flashback to Alice’s past made her current situation make even more sense. She’s not solely driven by her love for Cyrus, she’s also driven by a need to prove herself to her father - to show Wonderland's real. Bringing him into the mix will hopefully give things a needed shot in the arm. While this episode was interesting, it wasn’t fun. Even the lighter moments with Alice were tainted with equal helpings of untrue and creepy. For a series that started out so strong, they’ve gotten a bit mired down."

Christine Orlando of TV Fanatic gave the episode a 4.3 out of 5, signaling positive reviews.

Lily Sparks of TV.com gave the episode a mixed review, saying "So I’m not addicted to this heroine. I appreciated the semi-Victorian garb this week and the subtle look at what it’s like to feel abandoned by your parents—a theme scarcely investigated by OUAT. Gotcha, that is the ONLY theme investigated by OUAT, again and again, and again. OUAT this week was about druggie dads abandoning their kids, Wonderland was about kids escaping into drugs because of neglectful dads. Interesting, sure; entertaining? I don’t know. Go ask Alice."
