= And They Lived... =

- Once Upon a Time in Wonderland episode
- Episode no.: Season 1 Episode 13
- Directed by: Kari Skogland
- Written by: Edward Kitsis & Adam Horowitz & Zack Estrin
- Production code: 113
- Original air date: April 3, 2014

Guest appearances
- Whoopi Goldberg as Mrs. Rabbit (special guest star); Peta Sergeant as The Jabberwocky; Zuleikha Robinson as Amara; Raza Jaffrey as Taj; Brian George as Old prisoner; Benjamin Wilkinson as White Knight; Toby Levins as Sentry; Christian Bower as Jafar's guard; Leah Gibson as Nyx; Dejan Loyola as Rafi; Shaun Smyth as Edwin; Heather Doerksen as Sarah; Ben Cotton as Tweedle #2; Kylie Rogers as Millie; Amelia Wilkinson as Alice's daughter

Episode chronology
← Previous "To Catch a Thief"	Next → —

"And They Lived..." is the thirteenth episode and series finale of the Once Upon a Time spin-off series Once Upon a Time in Wonderland. Written by Edward Kitsis, Adam Horowitz, and Zack Estrin, and directed by Kari Skogland, it premiered on ABC in the United States on April 3, 2014. A week prior to this episode's release, it was announced by ABC Studios that the series was canceled.

In this final episode, Jafar and Amara becomes the two most powerful sorcerers in all the realms, resulting in a conflict between the two and a final battle with Jafar incurs.

Upon airing, the finale was watched by 3.38 million American viewers and attained an 18-49 rating of 0.9, marking an increase in viewers from the previous episode, but a slight decrease in 18-49 ratings. Commentators also gave the finale generally positive reviews.

== Plot ==
=== Opening sequence ===
The White Rabbit is seen in the forest.

=== In Wonderland ===
Jafar and Amara successfully break the laws of magic, becoming the two most powerful sorcerers in all the realms. However, despite this, Jafar refuses to share the title with Amara and tries to kill her as Amara attempts to heal Cyrus. Jafar is interrupted by his father, who wants nothing but the madness to end. Wanting to get the love he never got from his father, Jafar uses his magic on his father to love him and then coldly kills him. Amara and Alice use this commotion to flee the castle with Cyrus on a magic carpet. They seek refuge at the White Rabbit's home, where Amara heals Cyrus. Alice hatches a plan with Cyrus, Amara, and the White Rabbit to defeat Jafar and they part ways in two teams; Alice and the White Rabbit to find people to help fight Jafar, while Amara and Cyrus head to the Well of Wonders to return the magical waters to Nyx to undo Jafar's spell. Jafar raises the dead and commands them to hunt down and kill Alice, Cyrus, and Amara. He also resurrects Anastasia, who is under the impression that she is Jafar's lover.

Alice and the White Rabbit, after gathering some men and women, fight against Jafar's undead army, and Alice is promptly captured and taken to the castle. Jafar interrogates Alice to learn Amara's whereabouts and learns about their plan involving Nyx and the Well of Wonders. With Anastasia's help, Jafar heads over to eliminate Amara. Upon reaching the doorway to the Well of Wonders, Amara and Cyrus are ambushed by the undead army. Using her magic, Amara kills them and proceeds to sacrifice herself to Nyx as Jafar confronts them. In the mid of this, Alice and the White Rabbit ambush Jafar. As Amara slowly condensers into water, Jafar steals the water before it could be fully returned to Nyx. Believing that he defeated Alice and Cyrus, Nyx, angered that he stole her waters without her permission, curses Jafar into a genie and his genie bottle is sent to another realm. Once Jafar is defeated, his wrongdoings are undone; Will, Taj, and Rafi are freed from their genie imprisonment, and Anastasia remains dead. However, Nyx believes that, while the Red Queen was meant to move on, Anastasia's path lives on and instead she gifts Alice and Cyrus her waters to awake Anastasia. Will, upon Anastasia dying again, grieves her death again. When Alice and Cyrus return to the castle, they give Nyx's waters to Anastasia which awakens her. She reunites with Will as Cyrus reunites with his brothers. With nothing left to lose, Alice suggests that they return to Victorian England for their marriage. With the White Rabbit's help, Alice and Cyrus return home.

=== In Victorian England ===
Sometime after returning home, Alice prepares to wed Cyrus. On her wedding day, her father Edwin apologies for never believing in her tales of Wonderland. He walks her down the aisle while their guests: Sarah, Millie, Anastasia, Will, Taj, Rafi, Mrs. Rabbit, and Tweedledum look on. After reaching the end of the aisle, as Alice and Cyrus stand together, the White Rabbit officiates the wedding by talking about how Alice and Cyrus have stayed by each other through thick and thin and officially pronounce them as husband and wife. After the ceremony, Alice and Cyrus bid farewell to their friends as the White Rabbit sends everyone back home via his portal.

Many years later, while having tea with Cyrus in the garden of their home, Alice tells her tales of Wonderland to her daughter, noting that Anastasia and Will have become the White Queen and King of Wonderland while the White Rabbit looks in on the happy family.

== Production ==
Executive producers and creators of the series Adam Horowitz, Edward Kitsis, and Zack Estrin wrote this episode; while Kari Skogland directed it.

On 28 March 2014 — a week prior to the episode's release — it was revealed that the series would be ending.

Despite the show's cancellation, Edward Kitsis said prior to the show's premiere "We really want to tell the story without having to worry about how to stretch it for five years. This is not meant to be a 22-episode season. Whatever it ends up being, we'll have told a complete story ..." It was revealed in August 2013 at the TCA Summer Press Tour that, contrary to previous reports that more than 13 episodes were ordered straight out the gate, only the usual number of 13 episodes had been ordered. Edward Kitsis and Adam Horowitz commented "However many we wind up doing this season, what we're planning to do is tell a kind of complete tale with a beginning, middle and end" and added "If it does well [and] people like it, hopefully we'll come back and tell another adventure with this cast."

Prior to and after the show's cancellation, questions rose about whether the characters would be featured in the parent series, with the ABC president Paul Lee suggesting that Horowitz and Kitsis will "weave storylines across their assets."

== Reception ==
=== Ratings ===
The finale was watched by 3.38 million American viewers, and received an 18-49 rating/share of 0.9/3. Though the viewership improved slightly from the previous episode, the 18-49 rating decreased. The show placed third in its timeslot and fourteenth for the night.

=== Critical reception ===
The finale received generally positive reviews from critics.

Amy Ratcliffe of IGN gave the episode an 8.9 out of 10, saying "The series finale was emotionally satisfying and worthy of the characters and their stories. Though there is always room for improvement, it delivered what it needed to. It's unfortunate we won’t get more time with these characters in this setting."

Christine Orlando of TV Fanatic gave the episode a 4.4 out of 5, signaling positive reviews.

Lily Sparks of TV.com gave the episode (and the season) a mixed review, saying "Thanks to this finale, Wonderland's future fans will have an emotionally satisfying, classic happy ending to look forward to at the end of the rusty laser-tag game that was the season—an ending so complete and composed that I’m sure the production team had a big heads-up they wouldn't be getting a second season well before they wrote the finale script. No storylines were left unsewn, there was no signature Kitsis & Horowitz cliffhanger; instead, we saw a very All’s Well That End’s Well, every-character-reunited wedding, presided over by a CGI rabbit, no less."
