= Home (Once Upon a Time in Wonderland) =

- Once Upon a Time in Wonderland episode
- Episode no.: Season 1 Episode 8
- Directed by: Romeo Tirone
- Written by: Edward Kitsis & Adam Horowitz & Zack Estrin
- Original air date: December 12, 2013

Guest appearances
- Whoopi Goldberg as Mrs. Rabbit; Iggy Pop as the Caterpillar; Ben Cotton as Tweedle #2; Matty Finochio as Tweedle #1; Darren Shahlavi as Genie Hunter

Episode chronology
← Previous "Bad Blood"	Next → "Nothing to Fear"

"Home" is the eighth episode of the Once Upon a Time spin-off series Once Upon a Time in Wonderland. It also served as the series' winter finale.

== Plot ==
As Alice plans to reunite with Cyrus at the Outlands, she also plans to get answers from the White Rabbit about his connection to the Red Queen, which involves the White Rabbit's family. Meanwhile, the discord between Jafar and the Red Queen reaches its breaking point. Will, with the wish Alice gave him, wishes to stop Alice's suffering. As a result, Cyrus is no longer a genie. Instead, Will is, and he finds himself trapped in the genie's bottle, even as the river carries it over a waterfall.

== Production ==
Edward Kitsis, Adam Horowitz and Zack Estrin were the writers for the episode, while Romeo Tirone was its director.

== Reception ==
=== Ratings ===
The episode was watched by 3.30 million American viewers, and received an 18-49 rating/share of 0.8/3, roughly the same total viewers number as the previous episode but down in the demo. The show placed fifth in its timeslot and fourteenth for the night.

=== Critical reception ===
Amy Ratcliffe of IGN gave the episode a 7.3 out of 10. She said "Overall, the winter finale hit some high notes but also managed to disappoint in a few areas, too. The Alice and Cyrus reunion deserved more pomp and circumstance, but the final twist with the Knave was surprising and sets up a fun arc for the back half of the season."

Christine Orlando of TV Fanatic gave the episode a 4.5 out of 5, signaling positive reviews.

Kylie Peters of Den of Geek gave the episode a mixed review, saying "The episode is infinitely mock-able. But despite making little sense, it’s worth a mention that it did hold my interest. That interest came partially from the effort to figure out wtf was going on and partially from laughing at it, but there was some genuine interest, too. I’ve come to care about some of the characters (mostly Knave), and some long-developing plot points came to the forefront. It’s not entirely bad as fluff entertainment. You just have to be okay with random plot developments and deus ex machina."
