= Bad Blood =

Bad Blood may refer to:

== Film and television ==
=== Films ===
- Bad Blood (1981 film), a British-New Zealand thriller by Mike Newell
- Bad Blood (1986 film) (Mauvais Sang), a French film by Leos Carax
- Bad Blood (1994 film), also known as Viper, an American film by Tibor Takacs
- Bad Blood, a 1999 British television film written by Tony Marchant
- Bad Blood (2004 film), a Chilean crime drama action film by León Errázuriz
- Bad Blood (2010 film), a Hong Kong crime film by Dennis Law
- Bad Blood: A Cautionary Tale, a 2010 American documentary by Marilyn Ness
- Bad Blood (2011 film), an American drama by Michael Yebba
- Bad Blood (2017 film), an Australian thriller film by David Pulbrook
- Batman: Bad Blood, a 2016 animated superhero film

=== Television ===
- Bad Blood (TV series), a 2017–2018 Canadian TV series
- WWE Bad Blood, a professional wrestling pay-per-view event

==== Episodes ====
- "Bad Blood" (All Grown Up!)
- "Bad Blood" (Burn Notice)
- "Bad Blood" (Cardiac Arrest)
- "Bad Blood" (Degrassi High)
- "Bad Blood" (Doctor Who Confidential)
- "Bad Blood" (The Dresden Files)
- "Bad Blood" (Forever Knight)
- "Bad Blood" (Foyle's War)
- "Bad Blood" (Grey's Anatomy)
- "Bad Blood" (Haven)
- "Bad Blood" (Hit the Floor)
- "Bad Blood" (Law & Order: Special Victims Unit)
- "Bad Blood" (Legends of Tomorrow)
- "Bad Blood" (Once Upon a Time in Wonderland)
- "Bad Blood" (Prison Break)
- "Bad Blood" (Robin Hood)
- "Bad Blood" (Teenage Mutant Ninja Turtles)
- "Bad Blood" (True Blood)
- "Bad Blood" (Will & Grace)
- "Bad Blood" (Wycliffe)
- "Bad Blood" (The X-Files)

== Literature ==
- Bad Blood (Predator comic), a 1993 Predator comic
- Bad Blood (Buffy comic), a 1999–2000 Buffy the Vampire Slayer comic
- Bad Blood (Sage book), a 2000 memoir by Lorna Sage
- Bad Blood: Secrets and Lies in a Silicon Valley Startup, a 2018 nonfiction book about Theranos by John Carreyrou
- Bad Blood: A Walk Along the Irish Border, a 1987 book by Colm Tóibín
- Hellblazer Special: Bad Blood, a 2000 Hellblazer comic book limited series
- Bad Blood, a volume in the Creation Cinema series
- Bad Blood, a 1981 history of the Tuskegee syphilis experiment by James Jones
- Bad Blood, a 2007 novel by Rhiannon Lassiter
- Bad Blood, a 2010 Virgil Flowers novel by John Sandford
- Bad Blood, a 2010 Being Human novel by James Goss
- Bad Blood, a chapter of the 1993 novel Trainspotting by Irvine Welsh

== Music ==
=== Albums ===
- Bad Blood (Bastille album) or the title song (see below), 2013
- Bad Blood (Blood on the Dance Floor album) or the title song, 2013
- Bad Blood (Gerling album) or the title song, 2003
- Bad Blood (Ice album), 1998
- Bad Blood, by Peter Dolving, 2003

=== Songs ===
- "Bad Blood" (Bastille song), 2012
- "Bad Blood" (Ministry song), 1999
- "Bad Blood" (Neil Sedaka song), 1975
- "Bad Blood" (Siobhan Fahey song), 2005
- "Bad Blood" (Supergrass song), 2008
- "Bad Blood" (Taylor Swift song), 2015
- "Bad Blood", by Amorphis from Under the Red Cloud, 2015
- "Bad Blood", by Asking Alexandria from Where Do We Go from Here?, 2023
- "Bad Blood", by the Bonzo Dog Band from Let's Make Up and Be Friendly, 1972
- "Bad Blood", by Boy George and Culture Club from Life, 2018
- "Bad Blood", by Bright Eyes from Noise Floor (Rarities: 1998–2005), 2006
- "Bad Blood", by A Day to Remember from Big Ole Album Vol. 1, 2025
- "Bad Blood", by Doro from Angels Never Die, 1993
- "Bad Blood", by Escape the Fate from This War Is Ours, 2008
- "Bad Blood", by Europe from Prisoners in Paradise, 1991
- "Bad Blood", by Jess Glynne from I Cry When I Laugh, 2015
- "Bad Blood", by Phinehas from Thegodmachine, 2011
- "Bad Blood", by Radical Face from The Family Tree: The Leaves, 2016
- "Bad Blood", by Simian Mobile Disco from Temporary Pleasure, 2009
- "Bad Blood", by Ten Years After from About Time, 1989

== Video games ==
- Bad Blood (video game), a 1990 action role-playing game
- Dying Light: Bad Blood, a 2018 multiplayer expansion of Dying Light

== Other uses ==
- Bad blood, a name in the U.S. South for various illnesses including syphilis, anemia, and fatigue; see Tuskegee syphilis experiment

== See also ==
- Blood feud
