= Down the Rabbit Hole (Once Upon a Time in Wonderland) =

- Once Upon a Time in Wonderland episode
- Episode no.: Season 1 Episode 1
- Directed by: Ralph Hemecker
- Written by: Edward Kitsis & Adam Horowitz & Zack Estrin & Jane Espenson
- Original air date: October 10, 2013

Guest appearances
- Jonny Coyne as Dr. Lydgate; Iggy Pop as the Caterpillar; Jessy Schram as Ashley Boyd / Cinderella; Lee Arenberg as Leroy / Grumpy; Millie Brown as Young Alice; Shaun Smyth as Alice's father; Matty Finochio as Tweedledee; Ben Cotton as Tweedledum; Ryan Elm as Doctor #1; Michael Q. Adams as Doctor #2; Keith David as Cheshire Cat

Episode chronology
← Previous —	Next → "Trust Me"

"Down the Rabbit Hole" is the first episode of the Once Upon a Time spin-off series Once Upon a Time in Wonderland. Written by Edward Kitsis, Adam Horowitz, Zack Estrin, and Jane Espenson, and directed by Ralph Hemecker, it premiered on ABC in the United States on October 10, 2013.

In this premiere episode, Alice is rescued from her captivity in an insane asylum and returns to Wonderland to find her presumed-dead genie lover, while in flashbacks, her first and subsequent trips to Wonderland are revealed, which have dire consequences.

The premiere received generally positive reviews from critics, despite low ratings; the episode was watched by 5.8 million viewers.

== Plot ==
=== Opening Sequence ===
A title card which states "Once Upon a Time..."

=== In the characters' past ===
Alice (Sophie Lowe) returns home to her father (Shaun Smyth), who tells her that everyone thought she was dead. Her imaginative stories about a talking White Rabbit (John Lithgow) and a mystical place called Wonderland end up getting the attention of Dr. Lydgate (Jonny Coyne), a psychologist from an asylum. She is admitted to that asylum, where it is revealed that she continued frequent visits to Wonderland to confirm its reality. After capturing her proof in the form of the White Rabbit, she encounters Cyrus (Peter Gadiot), a genie with whom she falls in love. The two lovers have several adventures, leading to a fateful day on the cliff of the Boiling Sea, where Cyrus proposes to Alice. They are interrupted by the Red Queen (Emma Rigby), who has her henchmen attack them. In the end, the Red Queen throws Cyrus off the cliff into the sea, where Alice looks into the mist of where he's fallen. In a final flashback, it is revealed that Cyrus actually survived the fall into the Boiling Sea, as Jafar saved him with his flying carpet.

=== In Storybrooke ===
In present day, the Knave of Hearts (Michael Socha) resides in Storybrooke, Maine, stealing coffee in the dead of night from Granny's diner, until the White Rabbit interrupts him via bursting through a newly made rabbit hole. He convinces the Knave to help him save Alice, who is in Victorian England.

=== In Victorian England ===
Dr. Lydgate tells Alice that there is a new treatment that will take away all of her memories of Wonderland, which she agrees to allow them to use on her. The morning of the procedure, the Knave and White Rabbit come to save Alice, and the three of them escape the asylum and journey through a rabbit hole back to Wonderland, after convincing Alice that Cyrus has been seen alive.

=== In Wonderland ===
Upon arriving, the three land in a Mallow Marsh. The Rabbit recounts that he himself did not see Cyrus, rather that he had been told by the Dormouse that the latter had seen Cyrus at the Mad Hatter's house, which has been abandoned for some time. Alice and the Knave find themselves stuck in quicksand (made of marshmallow), and the Rabbit runs ahead to go find help. Alice and the Knave manage to escape, while ahead of them, the Rabbit is ambushed by the Red Queen. He is taken back to her palace, where it turns out that he was forced by her to bring Alice back to Wonderland. The Red Queen tells the Rabbit that he will be her eyes and ears in all of this, lest he be killed. The Rabbit complies and sadly walks away, when the Agrabahian sorcerer Jafar (Naveen Andrews) begins to talk to her. Jafar was the one who wanted Alice back in Wonderland. He tells the Queen she is no longer needed, but she convinces him not to kill her when she reminds him that she is the only one who knows of Alice's whereabouts. Back at the marsh, the Knave tells Alice that he never wished to return to Wonderland, and he would rather not continue on this journey. She takes off her heel, where it turns out she keeps three glowing gems that are actually wishes that Cyrus gave her long ago. She offers one to the Knave if he helps her see this adventure through. When asked why she doesn't use them to wish Cyrus back, Alice tells the Knave that wishes are far too unpredictable, and that wishing Cyrus back could likely teleport him to her as a hung corpse.

Alice and the Knave then begin to search for the Hatter's house, and Alice climbs a tree to get a better view of the forest, leaving her shoes with the Knave. At the top, she spies the Hatter's house. She is attacked by the Cheshire Cat (Keith David), who has become much more violent since she was last in Wonderland. She manages to return to the ground, noticing the Knave and her shoes are gone. Before she is eaten, the Knave returns, throwing a piece of size-altering mushroom into the Cheshire Cat's mouth. It shrinks to kitten size, and scurries off. The Knave returns her wishes, Alice assuring him that wishes will not work unless they are granted, not stolen. The two then make it to the Hatter's house, where they find only an empty home filled with hundreds of hats. The Rabbit appears again, telling them he searched all over for them. The Knave tells Alice it's likely all this was untrue, and Cyrus is still dead. Alice runs from the house, crying until she finds an amulet belonging to Cyrus on the ground. She takes this as proof that he is still alive and tells the two she will not stop on her quest to find her true love. Meanwhile, Cyrus is held captive by Jafar within a castle somewhere in Wonderland. Alice, the Knave and the White Rabbit continue their search, walking through a field in the distance.

== Production ==
In April 2013, Paul Reubens was cast as the voice of the White Rabbit and Emma Rigby was cast as the Red Queen.

On May 10, 2013, ABC announced that it had greenlit the spin-off, as well as also announcing that John Lithgow would replace Reubens as the voice of the White Rabbit. On May 14, 2013, ABC announced that the spin-off will air in the Thursday night timeslot instead of making it a fill-in for the parent series. Originally picked up for a standard 13-episode season, in late June 2013, ABC ordered an undisclosed number of additional episodes because creators Kitsis and Horowitz had already planned out the entire first season. "We really want to tell the story without having to worry about how to stretch it for five years," said Edward Kitsis. "This is not meant to be a 22-episode season. Whatever it ends up being, we'll have told a complete story ..."

== Cultural references ==
- This episode is a rendition of the Alice in Wonderland story, focusing on Alice's journey down the rabbit hole. Also included are the Caterpillar, the Cheshire Cat, the Knave of Hearts, the White Rabbit, the Tweedledee and Tweedledum and the Red Queen from the story's sequel as well as the genie and sorcerer from the Aladdin story.
- This episode takes its name from the first chapter of the novel Alice's Adventures in Wonderland.
- Young Alice wears a dress similar to the same outfit in the 1951 Disney film, Alice in Wonderland.

== Reception ==
=== Ratings ===
The premiere was watched by 5.82 million American viewers, and garnered an 18-49 rating/share of 1.7/5, placing third in its timeslot and tenth for the night.

Alex Strachan of Canada.com said, in regards to ratings, "Wonderland's future may well depend on a change of scenery — a new day and time, no pun intended — where it can be given room to breathe and find an audience" as the series faces competition with The Big Bang Theory.

=== Critical reception ===
The premiere has received moderate reviews from critics.

Amy Ratcliffe of IGN gave the episode an 8.6 out of 10, saying "If over -the-top fairy tale stories full of true love and elaborate costumes aren't your cup of tea, you probably won't fall head over heels for Wonderland but it's still worth giving a look. It's just that much fun. The pilot is strong, and it benefited some from having the portal to the realm of make believe already wide open to viewers in Once Upon a Time. However, the presence of wonderful actors and interesting characters pushed the premiere into the territory of wonderful. I really only have two concerns about the ongoing series: how they will sustain the plot and keep it interesting and how they will maintain the standard for the large number of visual effects."

Leanne Aguilera of E! Online recommended the series, saying "Watch it! We know that Thursday night is a highly competitive night for TV, but if you're a fan of Once Upon a Time's mesmerizing tales, you'll love exploring the new dangerous and dreamy world of Wonderland."

Rick Porter of Zap2it gave the episode a moderate review, saying "If you're a devotee of the works of Lewis Carroll, "Once Upon a Time in Wonderland" will probably make you cringe more than once. If, however, you're a fan of the original 'Once Upon a Time'—and of smart, competent female heroes—you'll probably find a good deal to like in ABC's new series."

Margaret Lyons's review via Vulture was more mixed, as she said "ABC's fairy-tale mishmash Once Upon a Time can be exciting and fun and sexy and a little badass. It can also be breathtakingly stupid and so corny it makes after-school specials look like Edward Albee plays. So too for its spinoff [...] which has similar virtues and vices. Some scenes are soaringly, beautifully romantic, while others threaten to give viewers spiritual diabetes. David Wiegand of the San Francisco Chronicle also gave the episode a mixed review. He called Naveen Andrews's role as Jafar "well enough to suggest the character can have a place in the hybridized plot", but then commented negatively on Emma Rigby's role as the Red Queen, calling her "a blond version of the Regina Mills/Evil Queen character played by Lana Parrilla on the original Once", and calling her acting "flat-out awful in the role. Her line delivery completely lacks either conviction or credibility. Worse, there's not the slightest hint of credible villainy in her performance, just an annoying whine of petulance;" he concluded with the comment "The plot is a little overstuffed, but the special effects, crisp direction and high-octane performances keep us interested enough to follow Alice down the rabbit hole."

Mike Hale of The New York Times gave the premiere a more negative review; he gave the scenes with the doctor and Alice a mixed review, calling them "grim and unoriginal, but at least it has a unified look and tone; at some point someone took the trouble to write 10 minutes of coherent drama". He then said "it won't matter if the story doesn't start making sense or if the special effects — mostly absent in an unfinished online screener, but unimpressive when visible — don't provide sufficiently trippy pleasure. In that case, not even a hookah will help." Robert Bianco of USA Today gave the premiere a negative review, rating it a 1.5 out of 4, saying the show "is lovely in an overly CGI kind of way, and yes, the fantasy-laced story is a welcome change from the usual TV pace. But we said much the same about the pilot of Wonderland's parent, Once Upon a Time — only to watch that series drift into incoherence, its plots driven less by storytelling needs than by Disney's desire to put its characters in front of young minds, and to put young hands into parental pockets.
