= To Catch a Thief (Once Upon a Time in Wonderland) =

- Once Upon a Time in Wonderland episode
- Episode no.: Season 1 Episode 12
- Directed by: Billy Gierhart
- Written by: Adam Nussdorf & Jerome Schwartz
- Original air date: March 27, 2014

Guest appearances
- Brian George as Old Prisoner; Raza Jaffrey as Taj; Dejan Loyola as Rafi; Zuleikha Robinson as Amara; Peta Sergeant as Jabberwocky; Reese Alexander as Jafar's Guard; Dan Payne as Captain of the Guard; Paul Tryl as Jafar's Guard #2

Episode chronology
← Previous "Heart of the Matter"	Next → "And They Lived..."

"To Catch a Thief" is the twelfth episode of the Once Upon a Time spin-off series Once Upon a Time in Wonderland.

== Plot ==
Revealed in flashback, the Knave hunts Alice per Cora's directive and finds himself striking a deal to get his heart back; Alice and the Knave's friendship is tested as he does Jafar's bidding. Meanwhile, the Jabberwocky attempts to free herself from Jafar's control and Jafar is confronted by his former partner.

== Production ==
Adam Nussdorf & Jerome Schwartz were the writers for the episode, while Billy Gierhart was its director.

== Reception ==
=== Ratings ===
The episode was watched by 3.35 million American viewers, and received an 18-49 rating/share of 1.0/3, down in the total viewers number but up in the demo from the previous episode. The show placed fourth in its timeslot and eleventh for the night.

=== Critical reception ===
Christine Orlando of TV Fanatic gave the episode a 4.2 out of 5, signaling positive reviews.

Ashley B. of Spoiler TV gave the episode a positive review. She said:

This is a series that I think would benefit from being a single sitting marathon. That way, one could really appreciate just how the story unfolds and grows darker. With only one episode left in the series, many events occurred this week with quite a few surprises. And yet, this episode didn't feel particularly rushed. I enjoyed how the flashbacks in this episode brought the story of Alice's past in Wonderland full circle. I was also pleased at the return of more humorous bits and definitely surprised more than once while watching.
