= Zero Hour (2013 TV series) =

2013 American TV series

- Genre: Drama
- Created by: Paul Scheuring
- Starring: Anthony Edwards; Scott Michael Foster; Addison Timlin; Jacinda Barrett; Carmen Ejogo; Michael Nyqvist
- Composers: Trevor Rabin; Paul Linford
- Country of origin: United States
- Original language: English
- No. of seasons: 1
- No. of episodes: 13

Production
- Executive producers: Paul Scheuring; Pierre Morel; Lorenzo di Bonaventura; Dan McDermott; Zack Estrin
- Producer: Ken Topolsky
- Production locations: Montreal, Quebec, Canada
- Cinematography: Anthony Wolberg
- Editor: Dennis Virkler
- Production companies: Clickety-Clack Productions; One Light Road; di Bonaventura Pictures Television; ABC Studios

Original release
- Network: ABC
- Release: February 14 – August 3, 2013

Zero Hour (stylized as ZERØ HØUR) is an American conspiracy television series, created by Paul Scheuring and starring Anthony Edwards. In the U.S., the pilot episode became available on Hulu Plus as of February 1, 2013, then the series began airing on ABC on February 14, 2013, as a midseason replacement. On March 1, after the third episode, ABC canceled the series due to low ratings and immediately removed it from the schedule. On April 26, 2013, it was announced that the remaining episodes would be burned off through the dead of summer, beginning with two episodes on June 15 and ending on August 3, 2013.

Zero Hour aired in Canada (but was filmed in both Montreal and New York City) on the Global Television Network for the first three episodes until ABC canceled it, later running the remaining episodes through the summer. Zero Hour aired via the Fox network in Italy, Spain and the Danish Broadcasting Corporation. Zero Hour was announced in 2012 as due to air in Australia on the Seven Network in 2013, but did not premiere until July 13, 2015, in an overnight timeslot, starting at 11:30 p.m.

== Plot ==
Hank Galliston (Anthony Edwards), publisher of a paranormal-skeptics magazine, gets caught up in a hunt for the holiest of relics going back to the early days of Nazi Germany after his wife, Laila (Jacinda Barrett), is abducted.

== Cast and characters ==
=== Main ===
- Anthony Edwards as Hank Galliston
- Carmen Ejogo as Agent Beck Riley
- Scott Michael Foster as Arron Martin
- Addison Timlin as Rachel Lewis
- Jacinda Barrett as Laila Galliston
- Michael Nyqvist as White Vincent

=== Recurring ===
- Amir Arison as Theodore Riley
- Dylan Baker as Agent Terrance Fisk
- Beth Dixon as Rose Galliston
- Charles S. Dutton as Father Mickle
- Jonathan Dwyer as Max
- Zach Grenier as Wayne Blanks
- Grace Gummer as Agent Paige Willis
- Amy Irving as Melanie Lynch
- Jamie Jackson as Reverend Mark
- Ken Leung as Father Reggie
- Jonathan Walker as Stan Jarvis
- Dan Ziskie as Roland Galliston

== Episode opening structure ==
Each episode begins with the view of the insides of ticking clockworks, focusing on one of the Roman numerals of the clock face, while the narrator recites a rhyming couplet relating the number to the title of the episode. Episode 1 begins with the number twelve, with each following episode counting down to the zero hour.

== Production ==
Zero Hour's pilot and second episode were written by series co-creator and co-executive producer Paul T. Scheuring. The two episodes were directed by co-executive producer Pierre Morel. Lorenzo di Bonaventura and Dan McDermott are also co-executive producers for the series, which is produced by ABC Studios. ABC placed an order for the series in May 2012.

== Cancellation ==
The series was pulled from ABC after only three episodes were aired, and it was cancelled on March 1, 2013.

== Reception ==
Reception for Zero Hour has been mixed. On Metacritic, the series received "generally unfavorable reviews", reflected by a Metascore of 39 out of 100, based on 29 reviews. The Wall Street Journal's Dorothy Rabinowitz said the first episode was "so awash in multiplying complications [it] manages to maintain its coherence and even a significant measure of suspense". Verne Gay of Newsday called it "ambitious and intermittently entertaining," adding "Zero Hour—and its celebrated lead [Anthony Edwards]—don't quite hit all their marks. But at least the mystery's a hoot." The New York Daily News' David Hinckley stated the series "dodges several bedrock problems that have torpedoed other recent attempts to make engaging series TV out of mystery thrillers", adding, "The question is whether Zero Hour can sustain [the setup] for 13 weeks, because what makes a good two-hour movie doesn't always make for 10 gripping hours of television." Mike Hale of The New York Times stated the series "is entirely dispensable, its silliness matched by its comic-book solemnity". The Washington Post's Hank Stuever called the series "rancid", adding "The dialogue is stilted and almost entirely expository. The plot is like receiving a coloring book that's already been colored. The grand mystery here fails to ignite interest." Tim Goodman from The Hollywood Reporter says the series is "worth the ride".

The premiere "marked the lowest-rated in-season debut for a scripted show ever on the network".

Starting on June 15, 2013, ABC began airing previously unaired episodes on the Saturday 8:00 p.m. time slot. Two back-to-back episodes aired on June 15, 2013. The two-hour finale aired on August 3, 2013.

== Episodes ==
Episode listing
No.	Title	Directed by	Written by	Original release date (Note: Air dates are for the United States only. Due to rescheduling of episodes 4–13 by ABC, these episodes have earlier air dates in some other countries. For example, episode 4 aired April 19 on DR3 in Denmark.)	U.S. viewers (millions)
1	"Strike"	Pierre Morel	Paul Scheuring	February 14, 2013	6.38
Hank Galliston publishes the magazine Modern Skeptic, which focuses on the paranormal. His wife Laila buys a unique-looking clock from a boardwalk vendor before being abducted. FBI Agent Riley arrives to show Hank and his copy editors, Arron and Rachel, video footage of Laila's abduction. The screen freezes on mercenary White Vincent, with whom Riley is familiar. Hank disassembles Laila's clock to find a flawed diamond. With light shone through it, the stone refracts a map. Hank shows the map and its markings to Father Mickle (Charles S. Dutton), a priest and old friend who says the map uses a language that died in the 2nd century. The priest also mentions the Rosicrucians, a group of Christian mystics of the 17th century, and says that the map points to a place called New Bartholomew. Hank leaves the map diamond with the priest, but Vincent assaults him, collecting the diamond. Hank follows a copy of the map to where New Bartholomew should be with Agent Riley in tow, as she tells him White Vincent's terrorist history. Meanwhile, Arron and Rachel travel to Bavaria to find the clock maker (Jan Tříska), who wears a Rosicrucian cross. He informs them that after the Nazis created a new "eternal life", the Church appointed twelve new "apostles" that assembled in 1938 to protect the war-torn world from doom. A clock was created for each, and they scattered to hide from the Nazis. New Bartholomew was not a place, but one of the apostles. Hank finds the location, which turns out to be a German submarine, stuck in Canadian ice, full of bodies. One of the bodies is New Bartholomew, who looks exactly like Hank. Outside, Vincent arrives as the clock maker's voiceover warns of the approaching tumultuous "zero hour".
2	"Face"	Pierre Morel	Paul Scheuring	February 21, 2013	5.39
Vincent is able to escape from Hank and Agent Riley. Hank had managed to take pictures of what Vincent came after – an old pocketwatch – and Riley retrieved a journal from the sinking submarine. Back in the office, Hank, his team and Father Mickle collaborate, discovering that the watch offers up another apostle, Thomas. Arron suggests the dots on the watch and its settings are a star constellation that was visible at a particular moment in time. Vincent also surmises this on his own and all paths lead to Chennai, India. Riley hands over the journal to Rachel, who has Arron to translate some of it. They talk to a Nazi collector (Zach Grenier), who shows them a film of Bartholomew and his group studying a young girl in 1938 who could talk with the dead. Riley joins Hank in Chennai and Rachel calls him to suggest this girl is the "new Thomas". Hank and Riley meet "Standing Mother", (Yolande Bavan) a woman who made a defiant vow 70 years ago to never sit again. Hank asks about a clock and Riley translates that the woman was told to destroy it if she ever saw Hank's face again. New Bartholomew had told her it would prophesy the coming of the Angel of Death. Vincent arrives to distract Hank and Riley, kill the woman and take her clock. He escapes again, but not before Hank sees Laila in his car.
3	"Pendulum"	Stephen Williams	Zack Estrin	February 28, 2013	5.05
While Vincent persuades Laila to fix the broken clock he recently obtained, the FBI use the Modern Skeptic office as a new hub. Laila's repairs reveal a new clue to Vincent, PR642. Vincent whisks her away, but Hank sees her gesture to a camera, which he knows is a clue for the FBI to search their abandoned hotel room. They find the code etched under a desk and Hank's father (Dan Ziskie) suggests the digits are a 1938 phone number. The physics department of the Institute for Advanced Study at Princeton, where Albert Einstein once worked, is the new location. It is revealed Einstein was also an apostle with a clock. Hank's team and the FBI believe Einstein's partially erased blackboard contains the much-sought-after answer in finding his clock. Meanwhile, Hank follows a trail he thinks was left by Laila but finds Vincent, who has lured him there to find a "flaw" in him. Riley interrupts and Vincent traps the two in the building. Before Vincent escapes again, he suggests to her that her husband's death was not incidental. Hank later finds Einstein's clock, and a message inside, believed to be Einstein's last words, gets decoded. The message states not only his remorse for helping creating the atomic bomb, but also his atonement by mentioning others' attempts to kill God.
4	"Chain"	Steven DePaul	Story by : M. Scott Veach; Teleplay by : Paul Scheuring & Tom Spezialy	June 15, 2013	2.11
Suffering from wounds he sustained in the shootout with Riley, Vincent is in hiding and holding Laila captive. Laila sees how vulnerable he is and convinces him to let her help him extract the bullets, while she looks for an opportunity to escape. Vincent knows he must get Hank to find the next clock and barters with him for Laila's release. Not heeding the warnings from the Shepherds, Hank soon realizes that people aren't as they appear to be, including his wife of five years who has just briefly returned to him.
5	"Suspension"	Mario Van Peebles	Jerome Schwartz	June 15, 2013	1.69
Frustrated and confused about Laila possibly being a Shepherd, Hank and Beck must travel to Asunción, Paraguay, only to cross paths again with Vincent. He is also looking for Hank's elusive wife and shares revealing information with Hank about his past and their connection. Meanwhile, Arron and Rachel meet Melanie Lynch, who is secretly known as "Mother", head of the 41 Trust. Lynch has her own agenda and interest regarding the relic, which is believed to be the original cross of Jesus Christ.
6	"Weight"	Jean de Segonzac	Denitria Harris-Lawrence & Soo Hugh	June 22, 2013	2.13
Hank visits his parents for answers and discovers more mysteries concerning his past. Beck, Paige, Arron and Rachel travel to Istanbul in search of Laila. Hank meets a man who has some of the answers he seeks and finds that their past is intertwined.
7	"Sync"	Jim McKay	Tom Spezialy & Jerome Schwartz	June 29, 2013	2.43
All of the clocks are gathered together, and they point the way to Strasbourg. Hank learns that he is the "detonator" for Zero Hour.
8	"Winding"	Jeff Thomas	M. Scott Veach & Paul T. Scheuring	July 6, 2013	2.03
The clock at the Strasbourg Cathedral gives up its secret, and reveals that the true cross is in the Faroe Islands. Paige is revealed to be a Shepherd mole and attempts to kill the others to secure the location of the cross. Meanwhile, Vincent has learned the cross' independently, and is on his way there by boat with Riley's supposedly dead husband Theo. Vincent also learns that he was the submarine commander in WWII, and he was shot and killed by New Bartholomew ("Hank") to ensure that the cross reached Faroe.
9	"Balance"	Billy Gierhart	Paul T. Scheuring	July 13, 2013	2.04
Hank and Vincent unearth two separate boxes on the Faroe Islands. Vincent's box contains the sub commander's body. Hank's box is empty, except for some insects, which are taken by Theo. God seems to be trying to stop the proceedings. Hank's father wants to tell Hank something about his origins.
10	"Escapement"	Ken Fink	Tom Spezialy & Jerome Schwartz	July 20, 2013	1.79
Hank's father is working for the 41 Trust. Hank's mother reveals that Hank and Vincent were cloned by Hank's dad from blood samples taken from their WWII counterparts. The insects ate the wood of the cross as well as the blood of Christ, and Theo has been able to obtain a sample of Jesus Christ's DNA from them.
11	"Hands"	Clark Johnson	Jess Pineda & Julie Benson	July 27, 2013	1.91
The 41 Trust compares Hank's perfectly cloned DNA to White Vincent's imperfectly cloned DNA, and determines how to make a perfect clone of Jesus Christ. Vincent kills Laila to save Hank and he escapes with the 41 Trust members by helicopter as the FBI arrives.
12	"Ratchet"	Stephen Williams	Dentria Harris-Lawrence & Paul T. Scheuring	August 3, 2013	1.84
The 41 Trust moves to their "New Jerusalem" in a monastery in an uncharted area of Tajikistan. Melanie has gathered a group of orphan girls there. One is selected to be implanted with the clone of Jesus Christ. The attempt fails. A second girl, named Alima, is chosen and the attempt succeeds. Melanie announces that Alima's implant was just a test, and that she intends to carry the child. After being successfully implanted, she orders Vincent to kill all of the girls.
13	"Spring"	Stephen Williams	Jerome Schwartz & Zack Estrin	August 3, 2013	1.92
Vincent spares the girls. Melanie tries to convince Alima to sacrifice herself. Melanie's implant begins to mutate into something terrible. Hank and Vincent, who changes sides, rescue Alima as the monastery implodes, killing Melanie and apparently Vincent. In New York, Hank and company ponder the future of the magazine. Eight months later, in a village in Africa, Alima is seen healing the sick. Among the people who come is Vincent, who survived the implosion.
