= Once Upon a Time in Wonderland =

American television series

- Genre: Fantasy; Drama; Adventure; Mystery
- Created by: Edward Kitsis; Adam Horowitz; Zack Estrin; Jane Espenson
- Starring: Sophie Lowe; Michael Socha; Peter Gadiot; Emma Rigby; Naveen Andrews
- Voices of: John Lithgow as Percy the White Rabbit
- Theme music composer: Mark Isham
- Composer: Mark Isham
- Country of origin: United States
- Original language: English
- No. of seasons: 1
- No. of episodes: 13

Production
- Executive producers: Edward Kitsis; Adam Horowitz; Steve Pearlman; Zack Estrin
- Producers: Kathy Gilroy; Joe Lazarov; Brian Wankum
- Production locations: Vancouver, British Columbia
- Cinematography: Attila Szalay
- Editor: Geofrey Hildrew
- Running time: 45 minutes
- Production companies: ABC Studios; Kitsis/Horowitz

Original release
- Network: ABC
- Release: October 10, 2013 – April 3, 2014

Related
- Once Upon a Time

Once Upon a Time in Wonderland is an American fantasy-drama series that aired on ABC from October 10, 2013, to April 3, 2014. A spin-off of Once Upon a Time, it was created by Edward Kitsis, Adam Horowitz, Zack Estrin, and Jane Espenson for ABC Studios. Inspired by the Lewis Carroll novels Alice's Adventures in Wonderland (1865) and Through the Looking-Glass (1871), the series takes place in Once Upon a Time's iteration of Wonderland, and follows the same setting as the parent series, including the use of Disney and Lost allusions.

Wonderland received mixed to positive reviews from critics, who praised its cast, visuals, and narrative, but criticized the plot. On March 27, 2014, the series was canceled after one season, with the finale airing a week later. Michael Socha reprises his Wonderland role as Will Scarlet / Knave of Hearts in Once Upon a Time as a series regular for its fourth season.

== Premise ==
After the apparent death of her true love Cyrus, Alice returns home to Victorian England where she is placed in an asylum, and her doctors aim to cure her with a treatment that will make her forget everything about her tales in Wonderland. However, she is rescued by the Knave of Hearts and the White Rabbit and brought back to Wonderland to save Cyrus, who is discovered to be alive. Now back in Wonderland, Alice must evade the plots of Jafar and the Red Queen, all while dealing with the whimsical dangers of Wonderland, including the infamous Jabberwocky, in a crazy and dangerous way to find her true love.

== Cast and characters ==
=== Main ===
- Sophie Lowe as Alice
- Michael Socha as Will Scarlet / Knave of Hearts / White King
- Peter Gadiot as Cyrus
- Emma Rigby as Anastasia / Red Queen / White Queen
- Naveen Andrews as Jafar
- John Lithgow as the voice of Percy the White Rabbit

=== Recurring ===
- Jonny Coyne as Dr. Lydgate
- Ben Cotton as Tweedledum
- Heather Doerksen as Sarah
- Keith David as the Cheshire Cat (voice)
- Matty Finochio as Tweedledee
- Brian George as the Sultan / Old Prisoner
- Whoopi Goldberg as Mrs Rabbit (voice)
- Lauren McKnight as Elizabeth "Lizard"
- Iggy Pop as the Caterpillar (voice)
- Zuleikha Robinson as Amara
- Peta Sergeant as the Jabberwocky
- Garwin Sanford as the Red King
- Shaun Smyth as Edwin, Alice's father

=== Guest ===
- Lee Arenberg as Leroy / Grumpy
- Jessy Schram as Cinderella / Ashley Boyd
- Barbara Hershey as Cora / Queen of Hearts
- Sean Maguire as Robin Hood
- Kristin Bauer van Straten as Maleficent (voice)
- Sarah-Jane Redmond as Anastasia's mother
- Millie Bobby Brown as young Alice
- Jason Burkart as Little John
- Michael P. Northey as Friar Tuck

== Production and casting ==
In February 2013, Kitsis and Horowitz, along with producers Zack Estrin and Jane Espenson, began development on a spin-off of Once Upon a Time which would focus on Lewis Carroll's Wonderland. It was initially reported that the proposed spin-off would recast the role of Mad Hatter, portrayed by Sebastian Stan in the parent series, due to his commitment to the Marvel Cinematic Universe as Bucky Barnes / Winter Soldier. Kitsis later revealed the next month that due to fan backlash and respect for Stan's performance, the character would not be recast and the series would proceed without the character.

The show includes new characters, such as "Amahl, described as exotic, soulful and optimistic; and The Knave, a sardonic adventurer, a man of action, a loner and a heart-breaker." On March 28, 2013, it was announced that Sophie Lowe would portray the lead role of Alice. It was also announced that Peter Gadiot would play her love interest, Cyrus, who has "a background". Michael Socha will portray the Knave of Hearts. Barbara Hershey, who has appeared as Cora, the Queen of Hearts, in the main series, may also appear in this spin-off reprising the same role in back stories . Also, during the month of April, Paul Reubens was cast as the voice of the White Rabbit and Emma Rigby was cast as the Red Queen.

On May 10, 2013, ABC announced that it had greenlit the spin-off, as well as also announcing that John Lithgow would replace Reubens as the voice of the White Rabbit. On May 14, 2013, ABC announced that the spin-off will air in the Thursday night timeslot instead of making it a fill-in for the parent series. "We really want to tell the story without having to worry about how to stretch it for five years," said Edward Kitsis. "This is not meant to be a 22-episode season. Whatever it ends up being, we'll have told a complete story ..." It was revealed in August at the TCA Summer Press Tour that, contrary to previous reports that more than 13 episodes were ordered straight out the gate, only the usual number of 13 episodes had been ordered. Kitsis and Horowitz commented, "However many we wind up doing this season, what we're planning to do is tell a kind of complete tale with a beginning, middle and end" and added "If it does well [and] people like it, hopefully we'll come back and tell another adventure with this cast."

At Comic-Con 2013, it was announced that former Lost star Naveen Andrews would be joining the cast as the villain Jafar. It was later announced in September that Keith David and Iggy Pop would also join the cast as the Cheshire Cat and Caterpillar, respectively. Iggy Pop replaced Roger Daltrey, who voiced the character as a guest star on Once Upon a Time. Barbara Hershey reprised her Once Upon a Time role as Cora / Queen of Hearts in one episode.

== Episodes ==
No.	Title	Directed by	Written by	Original release date	US viewers (millions)
1	"Down the Rabbit Hole"	Ralph Hemecker	Edward Kitsis & Adam Horowitz & Zack Estrin & Jane Espenson	October 10, 2013	5.82
Alice's tales of her adventures in Wonderland result in her father committing her to a mental asylum where she was about to be lobotomised to cure her supposed insanity, but the Knave of Hearts and the White Rabbit rescue her and bring her back to Wonderland when they reveal that her true love Cyrus is still alive. As Alice begins a quest to find him, the Red Queen and Jafar plot against her.
2	"Trust Me"	Romeo Tirone	Rina Mimoun	October 17, 2013	4.53
Alice formulates a plan to rescue Cyrus by retrieving his bottle. Meanwhile, the Red Queen begins to question her role in Jafar's plan while they try to find the bottle as well. Also, the story behind how Cyrus got to Wonderland and how he fell in love with Alice is revealed.
3	"Forget Me Not"	David Solomon	Richard Hatem	October 24, 2013	4.38
With the Genie's bottle in her clutches, the Red Queen sends the Bandersnatch after Alice since Jafar needs her in order to use Cyrus (who is discovered to have contacted her). Alice and the Knave of Hearts head to the house of the Grendel in the Whispering Woods to obtain the Forget-Me-Knot so that they can find out who stole Cyrus's bottle before Jafar could steal it. In the Knave of Hearts's flashback, it is shown that he joined up with Robin Hood's Merry Men back when he was Will Scarlet. It is also revealed that Wonderland's Red Queen was once his love Anastasia.
4	"The Serpent"	Ralph Hemecker	Jan Nash	November 7, 2013	3.55
The Knave of Hearts is kidnapped by the Red Queen (on behalf of Jafar) after saving him from Caterpillar's Collectors. Jafar wants him publicly beheaded to serve as an example of what happens to anyone who helps Alice. Alice befriends a collector named "Lizard" who helps Alice in her mission to rescue the Knave of Hearts. Meanwhile, the Red Queen is hesitant to kill the Knave since she's still in love with him and flashbacks reveal Jafar's real reasons for wanting Cyrus's power.
5	"Heart of Stone"	Paul Edwards	Katie Wech	November 14, 2013	3.73
In the past, Scarlet and Anastasia go through the Looking Glass into Wonderland only to find it is not completely what they expected. Anastasia gains a royal status throughout Wonderland after accepting a deal with the Red King. In the present time, the Red Queen makes a deal with Alice to gain special magic dust that only someone pure of heart can claim, while the White Rabbit is forced to work for Jafar.
6	"Who's Alice"	Ron Underwood	Jerome Schwartz	November 21, 2013	3.53
While traveling through the Black Forest to get to the recently-escaped Cyrus, Alice ends up in Boro Grove where she starts to lose her memory as the Knave of Hearts tries to get her to leave Boro Grove. While Cyrus evades the Red Queen, Jafar heads to Victorian England with the White Rabbit in order to find the ones that Alice cares about. Flashbacks reveal what happened after Alice had presumed Cyrus died where it was shown that her father Edwin had remarried a woman named Sarah resulting in Alice having a half-sister named Millie.
7	"Bad Blood"	Ciaran Donnelly	Jane Espenson	December 5, 2013	3.24
As Alice and the Knave of Hearts make a rescue plan to get Cyrus off of Jafar's floating island, Jafar brings Edwin (Alice's father) to Wonderland and assumes his form to get Alice to use her second wish. In a flashback, Jafar meets his father, the Sultan, which leads to the events that made Jafar into the villain he is today.
8	"Home"	Romeo Tirone	Edward Kitsis & Adam Horowitz & Zack Estrin	December 12, 2013	3.30
As Alice plans to reunite with Cyrus at the Outlands, she also plans to get answers from the White Rabbit about his connection to the Red Queen, which involves the White Rabbit's family. Meanwhile, the discord between Jafar and the Red Queen reaches its breaking point. Will, with the wish Alice gave him, wishes to stop Alice's suffering. As a result, Cyrus is no longer a genie. Instead, Will is, and he finds himself trapped in the genie's bottle, even as the river carries it over a waterfall.
9	"Nothing to Fear"	Michael Slovis	Richard Hatem & Jenny Kao	March 6, 2014	3.27
Cyrus and Alice reluctantly work with the Red Queen to find Will but must also be prepared to defend themselves from Jafar (when he looks for the Jabberwocky upon being told about it by the Caterpillar) and local inhabitants wanting revenge on the Red Queen for not protecting them from the beasts that hunt in their lands. Will has troubles of his own when Lizard finds the genie bottle that he is in and is granted three wishes.
10	"Dirty Little Secrets"	Alex Zakrzewski	Adam Nussdorf & Rina Mimoun	March 13, 2014	3.22
Cyrus recalls the events that led to the binding price he and his brothers had to pay. Meanwhile, the Red Queen and the Knave are forced to confront the Jabberwocky.
11	"Heart of the Matter"	David Boyd	Jenny Kao & Katie Wech	March 20, 2014	3.51
Alice and Cyrus discover alarming information involving prisoners Jafar has under his control that changes their priorities. Meanwhile, the Red Queen is in critical danger and no one can help her, except for the Knave, by surrendering information to Jafar that he's been desperately seeking. In flashback, Anastasia is about to marry the Red King and strikes up a friendship with Cora (Queen of Hearts) that directly impacts Will. Cora also confronts Will, resulting in him asking her for a shocking demand.
12	"To Catch a Thief"	Billy Gierhart	Adam Nussdorf & Jerome Schwartz	March 27, 2014	3.35
Revealed in flashback, the Knave hunts Alice per Cora's directive and finds himself striking a deal to get his heart back; Alice and the Knave's friendship is tested as he does Jafar's bidding. Meanwhile, the Jabberwocky attempts to free herself from Jafar's control and Jafar is confronted by his former partner.
13	"And They Lived..."	Kari Skogland	Edward Kitsis & Adam Horowitz & Zack Estrin	April 3, 2014	3.38
As Jafar gains the ability to change the laws of magic, Alice works to help Amara escape with Cyrus. Jafar uses his newfound powers to gain his father's love before drowning him, and then raises an army of dead Wonderland soldiers to fight against Amara and her allies, even while Amara uses her magic to revive Cyrus. Then, Amara and Cyrus work to return the water of the Well of Wonders to the Nyx, while Alice raises an army of her own to battle against Jafar. Alice is captured in an ensuing battle, and the Knave is forced to look on as Jafar revives Anastasia and tricks her into loving Jafar. In order to defeat Jafar, Cyrus tries revert the genie curse, and tricks Jafar into turning into a genie by Nyx and banishing him. Amara dies in the process. Alice and Cyrus return to England where they marry. Several years later, Alice and Cyrus tell their daughter about the adventures in Wonderland, with the White King and Queen as the rulers of Wonderland.

== Reception ==
Rotten Tomatoes gave the series an approval rating of 59% based on 27 reviews, with an average rating of 6.03/10. The site's critical consensus reads "Once Upon a Time in Wonderland is attractive to the eye and pleasantly narrated, but it loses some luster due to a jumbled story and Wonderland's unlikable inhabitants." The series has a score of 59/100 on Metacritic based on 23 critics, indicating "mixed or average reviews".

Common Sense Media rated the show 4 out of 5 stars, stating : "Parents need to know that, similar to its parent series, Once Upon a Time, Once Upon a Time in Wonderland extrapolates on familiar fairy tales and stories in creative and often mature ways. This one has its roots in Lewis Carroll's classic tale Alice's Adventures in Wonderland, but it incorporates other fantasy characters from unrelated stories as well. Despite its relationship to stories synonymous with childhood, this isn't a show for young kids, thanks to plenty of violence of both the traditional kind (knives, swordplay, and fistfights) and the magical kind. Danger lurks around every corner, and the characters' double-crossing and changing loyalties are part of the fun, but they will be confusing for some young viewers. Sex is less of an issue, although some female characters' attire — the voluptuous Red Queen's in particular — is designed to draw attention to certain curvy areas. The bottom line? Even though the cast of characters seems to contradict this dark show's target at an older audience, it's a tantalizing blend of action and drama with ties to stories you and your teens will have fun recalling from your own childhood".

Mary McNamara of the Los Angeles Times gave the show a positive review writing: "There is plenty of that—the good, the beautiful and the etc. Some of it is conjured by CG magic (the Red Queen's palace is splendid, and the White Rabbit's ears a masterwork), and some by just good storytelling and performer chemistry, which Lowe and Socha have in abundance. Add to that a smattering of witty dialogue, clever character twists and, of course, the Victo-goth steampunk look, and ABC has another shot at redefining the family hour." David Wiegand of the San Francisco Chronicle wrote that while the plot was "a little overstuffed", "the special effects, crisp direction and high-octane performances keep us interested enough to follow Alice down the rabbit hole." Brian Lowry of Variety gave the show a mixed review: "Wonderland is equally handsome [as Once Upon a Time], but behind those virtual sets lurk many potential flaws. An appealing Alice certainly helps matters, but past performance reduces the likelihood of a fairy-tale ending."

=== Ratings ===
Viewership and ratings per episode of Once Upon a Time in Wonderland
No.	Title	Air date	Rating/share (18–49)	Viewers (millions)	DVR (18–49)	DVR viewers (millions)
1	"Down the Rabbit Hole"	October 10, 2013	1.7/5	5.82	—N/a	—N/a
2	"Trust Me"	October 17, 2013	1.2/4	4.53	—N/a	—N/a
3	"Forget Me Not"	October 24, 2013	1.1/4	4.38	—N/a	—N/a
4	"The Serpent"	November 7, 2013	0.9/3	3.55	0.6	1.5
5	"Heart of Stone"	November 14, 2013	0.9/3	3.73	—N/a	—N/a
6	"Who's Alice?"	November 21, 2013	0.9/3	3.53	0.5	1.4
7	"Bad Blood"	December 5, 2013	0.9/3	3.24	—N/a	—N/a
8	"Home"	December 12, 2013	0.8/3	3.30	—N/a	—N/a
9	"Nothing to Fear"	March 6, 2014	0.9/3	3.27	—N/a	—N/a
10	"Dirty Little Secrets"	March 13, 2014	0.8/3	3.22	—N/a	—N/a
11	"Heart of the Matter"	March 20, 2014	0.8/3	3.51	—N/a	—N/a
12	"To Catch a Thief"	March 27, 2014	1.0/3	3.35	—N/a	—N/a
13	"And They Lived..."	April 3, 2014	0.9/3	3.38	—N/a	—N/a

=== Accolades ===
Year	Award	Category	Nominee(s)	Outcome	Ref
2014	Leo Awards	Best Hairstyling in a Dramatic Series	Heather Tillson	Nominated	
2014	The Joey Awards	Young Actress Age 9 or Younger in a TV Series Drama or Comedy Guest Starring or Principal Role	Milli Wilkinson	Won	
2014	People's Choice Awards	Favorite New TV Drama	Once Upon a Time in Wonderland	Nominated	
2015	Leo Awards	Best Make-Up in a Dramatic Series	Wendy Snowdon	Nominated	

== Broadcast and streaming ==
In Canada, the City network simulcasted the ABC broadcast as it debuted in October.

Episodes were released for purchase through the iTunes Store, Vudu and Amazon Prime. It became available to stream on Disney+ on November 27, 2020.
