= The Serpent (Once Upon a Time in Wonderland) =

- Once Upon a Time in Wonderland episode
- Episode no.: Season 1 Episode 4
- Directed by: Ralph Hemecker
- Written by: Jan Nash
- Original air date: November 7, 2013

Guest appearances
- Brian George as Old prisoner; Anthony Keyvan as Young Jafar; Lauren McKnight as Lizard; Zuleikha Robinson as Amara; Forbes Angus as Villager; Kevin Blatch as Executioner; Christian Bower as Drunken Guard; Ben Cotton as Tweedledum; Cedric De Souza as Akil; Matty Finochio as Tweedledee; Peter Hall as Peasant; Haroon Khan as Blacksmith; Marco Soriano as Gerard; Hugo Steele as Orang; Alicia Thorgrimmsson as Citizen

Episode chronology
← Previous "Forget Me Not"	Next → "Heart of Stone"

"The Serpent" is the fourth episode of the Once Upon a Time spin-off series Once Upon a Time in Wonderland.

== Plot ==
The Knave of Hearts is kidnapped by the Red Queen (on behalf of Jafar) after saving him from Caterpillar's Collectors. Jafar wants him publicly beheaded to serve as an example of what happens to anyone who helps Alice. Alice befriends a collector named "Lizard" who helps Alice in her mission to rescue the Knave of Hearts. Meanwhile, the Red Queen is hesitant to kill the Knave since she's still in love with him and flashbacks reveal Jafar's real reasons for wanting Cyrus' power.

== Production ==
Jan Nash was the writer for the episode, while Ralph Hemecker was its director.

== Reception ==
=== Ratings ===
The episode was watched by 3.55 million American viewers, and received an 18-49 rating/share of 0.9/3, down from the previous episode. The show placed fifth in its timeslot and fifteenth for the night.

=== Critical reception ===
Amy Ratcliffe of IGN gave the episode an 8.3 out of 10, giving it a positive review. She said "Tonight’s episode delivered some interesting backstory for Jafar and was expertly executed by Naveen Andrews, who showed he can still do nuance. The Knave/Queen story was deepened, too, and it’s nice to see things are still in a bit of play there. Alice got to be daring and fantastic. Her use of her first wish (and the shopkeeper’s last, too) shows a level of cleverness and forward thinking that is heartening to see, and engaging to me. How smart could you make your wish?"

Christine Orlando of TV Fanatic gave the episode a 4.2 out of 5, signaling positive reviews.

Lily Sparks of TV.com gave the episode a mixed to negative review, saying "What to do with Wonderland? It’s great hate-watching if you have that kind of time to kill and love raggin’ on sloppy green screen edge-feathering, but otherwise it is not exactly pushing me to the edge of my seat. The writers probably envisioned that audiences would respond to their characters the same way we've gotten attached to OUAT Original Seasoning. But OUAT Original spent a good year laying groundwork, letting us get to know the characters before making them pull laughable stunts in 100 percent CGI environments."
