= Nothing to Fear (Once Upon a Time in Wonderland) =

- Once Upon a Time in Wonderland episode
- Episode no.: Season 1 Episode 9
- Directed by: Michael Slovis
- Written by: Richard Hatem & Jenny Kao
- Original air date: March 6, 2014

Guest appearances
- Brian George as Old Prisoner; Lauren McKnight as Lizard; Iggy Pop as the Caterpillar; Peta Sergeant as Jabberwocky; Kate Bateman as Peasant 1; Matty Finochio as Tweedle #1; Nels Lennarson as Jabberwocky Guard; Paul Moniz de Sá as Peasant Ringleader; Justin Sproule as Guard

Episode chronology
← Previous "Home"	Next → "Dirty Little Secrets"

"Nothing to Fear" is the ninth episode of the Once Upon a Time spin-off series Once Upon a Time in Wonderland. It also served as the series' spring premiere.

== Plot ==
Cyrus and Alice reluctantly work with the Red Queen to find Will but must also be prepared to defend themselves from Jafar (when he looks for the Jabberwocky upon being told about it by the Caterpillar) and local inhabitants wanting revenge on the Red Queen for not protecting them from the beasts that hunt in their lands. Will has troubles of his own when Lizard finds the genie bottle that he is in and is granted three wishes.

== Production ==
Richard Hatem & Jenny Kao were the writers for the episode, while Michael Slovis was its director.

== Reception ==
=== Ratings ===
The episode was watched by 3.27 million American viewers, and received an 18-49 rating/share of 0.9/3, roughly the same total viewers number as the previous episode but up in the demo. The show placed fifth in its timeslot and fourteenth for the night.

=== Critical reception ===
Amy Ratcliffe of IGN gave the episode a 7.1 out of 10. She said "Overall, Wonderland made an entertaining return. The plot had some holes and the VFX was predictably awful, but there was still enough to tug at your heart and keep you engaged."

Christine Orlando of TV Fanatic gave the episode a 4.4 out of 5, signaling positive reviews.

Ashley B. of Spoiler TV gave the episode a positive review, praising in particular the character of the Jabberwocky and her introduction. She said "I feel as if with each new episode, the story of Once Upon a Time in Wonderland is getting richer and richer. I thought I would be disengaged by this episode, since the one proceeding seemed to reset the entire series, but I am more intrigued than ever as to how all this will play out."
