= Dirty Little Secret (disambiguation) =

"Dirty Little Secret" is a 2005 song by the All-American Rejects.

Dirty Little Secret or Dirty Little Secrets may also refer to:

- Dirty Little Secret (novel), a 2012 spy novel
- "Dirty Little Secret" (Kelly Clarkson song), a bonus track on the album My December
- "Dirty Little Secret" (Sarah McLachlan song), from the 2003 album Afterglow
- "Dirty Little Secret" (Preacher), a 2017 television episode
- "Dirty Little Secrets" (Once Upon a Time in Wonderland), a 2014 television episode
- "Dirty Little Secrets" (Scandal), a 2012 television episode
- "Dirty Little Secrets" (Suits), a 2011 television episode
- Dirty Little Secrets: Music to Strip by..., a 1999 remix album by My Life With The Thrill Kill Kult
- Jodi Arias: Dirty Little Secret, a 2013 television film
