= Trust Me (Once Upon a Time in Wonderland) =

- Once Upon a Time in Wonderland episode
- Episode no.: Season 1 Episode 2
- Directed by: Romeo Tirone
- Written by: Rina Mimoun
- Original air date: October 17, 2013

Guest appearances
- Jordana Largy as Silvermist; Matty Finochio as Tweedledee; Ben Cotton as Tweedledum; Brian George as Old prisoner; Michael Antonakos as Bearded man; Sarah Hayward as Townsperson #1; Gerry Rousseau as Townsperson #2

Episode chronology
← Previous "Down the Rabbit Hole"	Next → "Forget Me Not"

"Trust Me" is the second episode of the Once Upon a Time spin-off series Once Upon a Time in Wonderland.

== Plot ==
Alice (Sophie Lowe) develops a plan to find Cyrus (Peter Gadiot) and rushes to find his genie bottle, hidden somewhere in Wonderland.

== Production ==
Rina Mimoun was the writer for the episode.

== Reception ==
=== Ratings ===
The episode was watched by 4.53 million American viewers, and received an 18-49 rating/share of 1.2/4, down significantly from the premiere episode. The show placed fifth in its timeslot and twelfth for the night.

Alex Strachan of Canada.com said, in regards to ratings, "Wonderland’s future may well depend on a change of scenery — a new day and time, no pun intended — where it can be given room to breathe and find an audience" as the series faces competition with The Big Bang Theory.

=== Critical reception ===
Amy Ratcliffe of IGN gave the episode an 8.6 out of 10, giving it a positive review. She said "It's just the beginning of the series, but the chess board is set and we're in for an exciting game. Every character has spirit and is moving toward a defined purpose. The evil characters don't seem like they're going to change sides every five minutes, and that's such a relief. Unlike other shows. You know what I'm talking about here. Cough cough, Evil Queen."

Hillary Busis of Entertainment Weekly gave the episode a mixed to negative review, commenting on how the mood of each scene changed too rapidly. She said:

The show's tone seems to shift every time a different pair of characters appears onscreen: Alice and her genie's flashback sequences are straightforward googly-eyed romance. Alice and the Knave play off one another like characters in a classic buddy cop comedy. And when the Red Queen and Jafar get together, the show turns into a hammy scenery-chewing competition. (In a contest like that, there are no winners -- only indigestion.) Perhaps Wonderland, like its television parent, is simply trying to include something for every type of viewer -- the sentimental, the sarcastic, the camp lovers. Unfortunately, as is often the case on Once, attempting to please everyone necessarily means not truly satisfying anyone.
