= Heart of the Matter (Once Upon a Time in Wonderland) =

- Once Upon a Time in Wonderland episode
- Episode no.: Season 1 Episode 11
- Directed by: David Boyd
- Written by: Jenny Kao & Katie Wech
- Original air date: March 20, 2014

Guest appearances
- Brian George as Old Prisoner; Barbara Hershey as Cora; Iggy Pop as the Caterpillar; Peta Sergeant as Jabberwocky; Ben Cotton as Tweedle #2; Matty Finochio as Tweedle #1; Michael Jonsson as King's Guard; Trevor Lerner as Burly Guy; Chad Riley as Jafar's Guard

Episode chronology
← Previous "Dirty Little Secrets"	Next → "To Catch a Thief"

"Heart of the Matter" is the eleventh episode of the Once Upon a Time spin-off series Once Upon a Time in Wonderland. Written by Jenny Kao and Katie Wech and directed by David Boyd, it premiered on ABC in the United States on March 20, 2014.

In this episode, Anastasia's past involving Cora, the Queen of Hearts is revealed, including a secret of Will's while in present-day Wonderland, Alice and Cyrus makes an unexpected trip to Storybrooke to procure an item of great importance as Jafar's plan to break the laws of magic inches closer.

== Plot ==
=== Opening Sequence ===
Jafar's serpent staff is shown in the forest.

=== In the characters' past ===
Anastasia, the future Red Queen of Wonderland, is introduced to her servants, Tweedledee and Tweedledum, at the castle. During this meeting, the Queen of Hearts, Cora, pays an unexpected visit after learning that she has been invited to the Red King’s wedding. Curious about the new Queen, Cora offers to teach Anastasia magic, claiming it would make life at court easier. Anastasia declines, explaining that the Red King disapproves of magic because it creates a separation between royals and their servants. Although displeased by her response, Cora leaves the offer open. As the wedding approaches, Will Scarlet secretly visits Anastasia, believing that she is manipulating the King in order to steal his jewels. The two argue, unaware that Cora is listening. Before the guards can arrive, Will escapes. Later, Cora seeks him out and listens as he confesses that he cannot move on from Anastasia. He asks Cora to remove his heart so that he will no longer feel any emotions. She agrees and keeps his heart. Cora later shows Anastasia that Will has moved on and no longer loves her. Devastated by this revelation, Anastasia becomes emotionally vulnerable and ultimately accepts Cora’s offer to teach her magic, setting her on the path to becoming the Red Queen.

=== In Wonderland ===
Alice and Cyrus are warned by Tweedledum to escape Wonderland under Anastasia’s orders following the Jabberwocky’s release. However, unwilling to abandon Will, they instead enter the castle through a secret tunnel in an attempt to save both him and Anastasia. Meanwhile, Jafar, unable to alter the laws of magic because Will possesses his genie bottle, uses the Jabberwocky on Anastasia to uncover the source of the problem. As the Jabberwocky invades Anastasia’s memories, it inadvertently reads Alice’s mind, revealing that Alice and Cyrus are being held in the dungeon. Realizing this, Anastasia escapes the dungeon with Cyrus and seeks the White Rabbit’s help to locate Will’s heart. Using a portal, the group travels to Storybrooke. After retrieving Will’s heart, they return to Wonderland, where they are ambushed by Jafar. He steals the heart but loses his staff in the struggle. Alice and Cyrus then realize that the staff is actually Cyrus’s mother. Jafar later returns Will’s heart and, to ensure that it is functioning properly, kills Anastasia in front of him. Will reacts with intense grief and rage upon witnessing her death.

=== In Storybrooke ===
Using a portal, Alice, Cyrus, and the White Rabbit arrive on Main Street and travel to Will’s home to search for his heart. Inside, they discover a drawing of Anastasia and realize that the heart is hidden in the wall behind it. Using darts, they break open the wall, uncover a box containing Will’s heart, and return to Wonderland.

== Production ==
Jenny Kao & Katie Wech were the writers for the episode, while David Boyd was its director.

== Reception ==
=== Ratings ===
The episode was watched by 3.51 million American viewers, and received an 18-49 rating/share of 0.8/3, roughly the same demo as the previous episode but up in the total viewers number. The show placed fifth in its timeslot and twelfth for the night.

=== Critical reception ===
Christine Orlando of TV Fanatic gave the episode a 4.5 out of 5, signaling positive reviews.

Ashley B. of Spoiler TV gave the episode a positive review. She said:

I'm not saying [the last five minutes] were bad, they were actually extremely well done and quite the wham ending to this episode which I enjoyed, but wow, talk about your emotional roller coaster. The writers have a story to tell and it certainly isn't over yet, but when they pull stunts like this, you can't help but to sit and stare at your television and reflect on how attached you've grown to your favorite characters. Aside from having my heart ripped from my chest, it's good to see Cora back on our screens. Still as manipulative and cunning as ever, the Queen of Hearts cranked her pageant mom routine up to eleven in this episode.
