= Heart of Stone (Once Upon a Time in Wonderland) =

- Once Upon a Time in Wonderland episode
- Episode no.: Season 1 Episode 5
- Directed by: Paul Edwards
- Written by: Katie Wech
- Original air date: November 14, 2013

Guest appearances
- Brian George as Old prisoner; Sarah-Jane Redmond as Anastasia's mother; Garwin Sanford as Red King; Garrett Black as Palace Guard; Millie Bobby Brown as Young Alice; Ben Cotton as Tweedledum; Matty Finochio as Tweedledee; Richard Meen as Coachman; Julie Lynn Mortensen as Proper Lady #1; Hugo Steele as Orang; Rebecca Strom as Lady; Vanessa Walsh as Proper Lady #2

Episode chronology
← Previous "The Serpent"	Next → "Who's Alice"

"Heart of Stone" is the fifth episode of the Once Upon a Time spin-off series Once Upon a Time in Wonderland.

== Plot ==
In the past, Scarlet and Anastasia go through the Looking Glass into Wonderland only to find it is not completely what they expected. Anastasia gains a royal status throughout Wonderland after accepting a deal with the Red King. In the present time, the Red Queen makes a deal with Alice to gain special magic dust that only someone pure of heart can claim, while the White Rabbit is forced to work for Jafar.

== Production ==
Katie Wech was the writer for the episode, while Paul Edwards was its director.

== Reception ==
=== Ratings ===
The episode was watched by 3.73 million American viewers, and received an 18-49 rating/share of 0.9/3, roughly the same as the previous episode. The show placed fifth in its timeslot and thirteenth for the night.

=== Critical reception ===
Amy Ratcliffe of IGN gave the episode a 5.9 out of 10, giving it a mixed review. She said "Tonight's installment of Wonderland had some fun moments but was mostly predictable. It wasn't horrible, but also not awesome. The story at least moved forward so Cyrus and Alice are closer to being together. Additionally, Sophie Lowe and Emma Rigby offered some good character moments. They weren't enough to carry the episode though."

Christine Orlando of TV Fanatic gave the episode a 4.3 out of 5, signaling positive reviews.

Lily Sparks of TV.com gave the episode a positive review, saying "All in all, this was a pleasant, simple episode that added a few layers of emotional complexity to one of the series’ most cartoonish characters. The Red Queen definitely needed some characteristics beyond "evil" and "sexy," and we got them. I do wish that this episode had been front-loaded to air earlier in the season—it would've been nice to see more of the Knave and the Red Queen's backstory in the pilot, and the classically styled Alice and the general creepiness would've been a lot more engaging than the marshmallow swamp and terrible animated caterpillar and all that foolishness we endured in the first two episodes."
