= Forget Me Not (Once Upon a Time in Wonderland) =

- Once Upon a Time in Wonderland episode
- Episode no.: Season 1 Episode 3
- Directed by: David Solomon
- Written by: Richard Hatem
- Original air date: October 24, 2013

Guest appearances
- Steve Bacic as the Grendel; Kristin Bauer van Straten as Maleficent; Brian George as Old prisoner; Sean Maguire as Robin Hood; Iggy Pop as the Caterpillar; Mark Acheson as Nazim; Jason Burkart as Little John; Aaron Harrison as Screaming Head; Ryan MacDonald as Driver; Casey Manderson as Traveler #2; Catherine Michaud as Young Woman; Michael P. Northey as Friar Tuck; Thomas Saunders as Wealthy Gentleman; Hugo Steele as Orang

Episode chronology
← Previous "Trust Me"	Next → "The Serpent"

"Forget Me Not" is the third episode of the Once Upon a Time spin-off series Once Upon a Time in Wonderland.

== Plot ==
With the Genie's bottle in her clutches, the Red Queen sends the Bandersnatch after Alice since Jafar needs her in order to use Cyrus (who is discovered to have contacted her). Alice and the Knave of Hearts head to the house of the Grendel in the Whispering Woods to obtain the Forget-Me-Knot so that they can find out who stole Cyrus's bottle before Jafar could steal it. In the Knave of Hearts's flashback, it is shown that he joined up with Robin Hood's Merry Men back when he was Will Scarlet. It is also revealed that Wonderland's Red Queen was once his love Anastasia.

== Production ==
Richard Hatem was the writer for the episode, while David Solomon was its director.

== Reception ==
=== Ratings ===
The episode was watched by 4.38 million American viewers, and received an 18-49 rating/share of 1.1/4, down from the previous episode. The show placed fifth in its timeslot and thirteenth for the night.

=== Critical reception ===
Amy Ratcliffe of IGN gave the episode a 7.2 out of 10, giving it a positive review. She said "Overall, this episode wasn't the strongest but there was plenty to enjoy. The reveal of Anastasia's identity opens the doors to plenty of stories, the most obvious one being how and why she betrayed the Knave. I'm dying to know how she stepped into the Red Queen's elegant shoes. The Alice and Cyrus story was the undercurrent in this episode, and it's good to know they're willing to put the main plot in the backseat from time to time."

Christine Orlando of TV Fanatic gave the episode a 4.3 out of 5, signaling positive reviews.

Hillary Busis of Entertainment Weekly gave the episode a mixed to negative review, despite giving a positive comment about the chemistry between Lowe and Socha. She said:

Wonderland isn’t a bad show, per se — but it’s also not great, or at least not as engaging as its parent show Once Upon a Time. Though Wonderland‘s main duo (Sophie Lowe’s Alice and Michael Socha’s Knave) have good chemistry and general appeal, the series surrounding them is tonally confused: It’s too cartoony to be taken anywhere near seriously, but too earnest and predictable to veer into pure giddy camp. And then there’s that horrific CGI, which might be fun and whimsical if it didn’t look so dreadfully cheap. Lowe and Socha have a lot to offer; too bad they’re offering it against a backdrop ripped from a Windows 95 screensaver.
