= Bad Blood (Once Upon a Time in Wonderland) =

- Once Upon a Time in Wonderland episode
- Episode no.: Season 1 Episode 7
- Directed by: Ciaran Donnelly
- Written by: Jane Espenson
- Original air date: December 5, 2013

Guest appearances
- Amir Arison as Sultan; Brian George as Old Prisoner; Shaun Smyth as Edwin; Heather Doerksen as Sarah; Anthony Keyvan as Young Jafar; Rekha Sharma as Ulima; Ben Cotton as Tweedle #2; Shaun Omaid as Palace Guard; Michael Sangha as Adult Mirza; Manoj Sood as Diplomat; Daniel Zolghadri as Young Mirza

Episode chronology
← Previous "Who's Alice"	Next → "Home"

"Bad Blood" is the seventh episode of the Once Upon a Time spin-off series Once Upon a Time in Wonderland.

== Plot ==
As Alice and the Knave of Hearts make a rescue plan to get Cyrus off of Jafar's floating island, Jafar brings Edwin (Alice's father) to Wonderland and assumes his form to get Alice to use her second wish. In a flashback, Jafar meets his father, the Sultan, which leads to the events that made Jafar into the villain he is today.

== Production ==
Jane Espenson was the writer for the episode, while Ciaran Donnelly was its director.

== Reception ==
=== Ratings ===
The episode was watched by 3.24 million American viewers, and received an 18-49 rating/share of 0.9/3, down in total viewers but roughly the same demo as the previous episode. The show placed fifth in its timeslot and twelfth for the night.

=== Critical reception ===
Amy Ratcliffe of IGN gave the episode an 8.4 out of 10, giving it a positive review. She said: "Even though we didn't get much closer to Cyrus (their reunion is going to have to be epic at this point - no pressure), tonight's installment packed plenty of emotional punches and action. The overall story was one that kept you in a state of constant anticipation of the next scene. "Bad Blood" wasn't epic, but it was fun and satisfying."

Christine Orlando of TV Fanatic gave the episode a 4.3 out of 5, signaling positive reviews. David Griffin of Screen Rant also gave the episode a positive review.
