= Kristin Bauer van Straten =

American actress

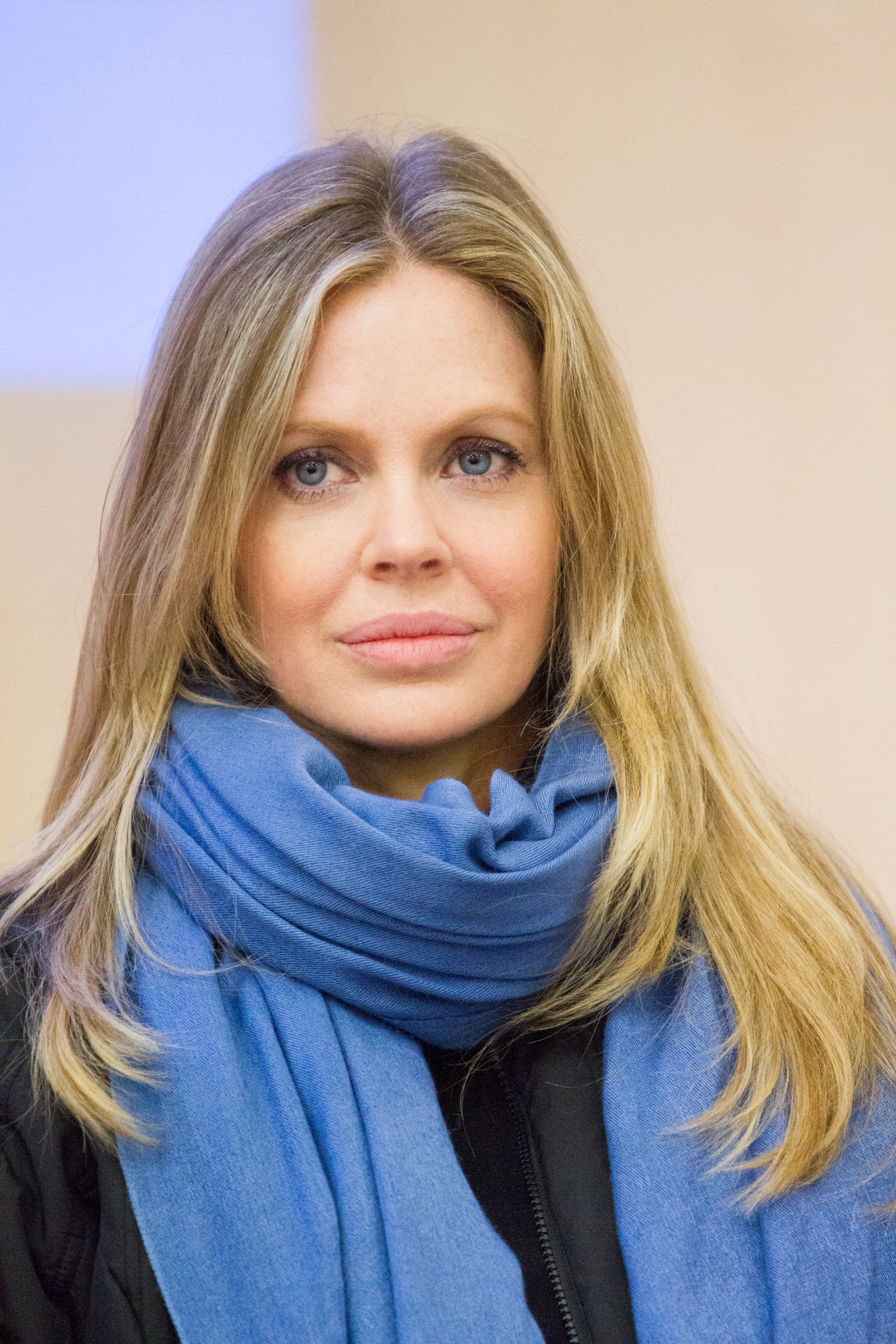
- Bauer van Straten at the 2012 Toulouse Game Show
- Born: Kristin Neubauer; Racine, Wisconsin, U.S.
- Education: Washington University in St. Louis; Parsons The New School for Design
- Occupation: Actress
- Years active: 1993–present
- Spouse: Abri van Straten (m. 2009)
- Website: www.kristinbauer.com

Kristin Bauer van Straten (née Neubauer) is an American film and television actress, notable for her roles as vampire Pamela Swynford De Beaufort on the HBO television series True Blood, Jerry's girlfriend Gillian ("man hands") on Seinfeld, and as Maleficent in the ABC series Once Upon a Time.

== Personal life ==
Bauer van Straten was born Kristin Neubauer in Racine, Wisconsin. She is of German descent. During childhood, she played sports, rode horses, and fired shotguns. She graduated from the Prairie School in Wind Point. Bauer van Straten studied fine arts at Washington University in St. Louis, as well as in Boston and at New York City’s Parsons The New School for Design in her youth, but decided to become an actress and moved to Los Angeles, where she has been living since she began acting in 1994. She continues to draw and paint. Her works include commissioned portraits.

On August 1, 2009, she married musician Abri van Straten.

== Acting career ==
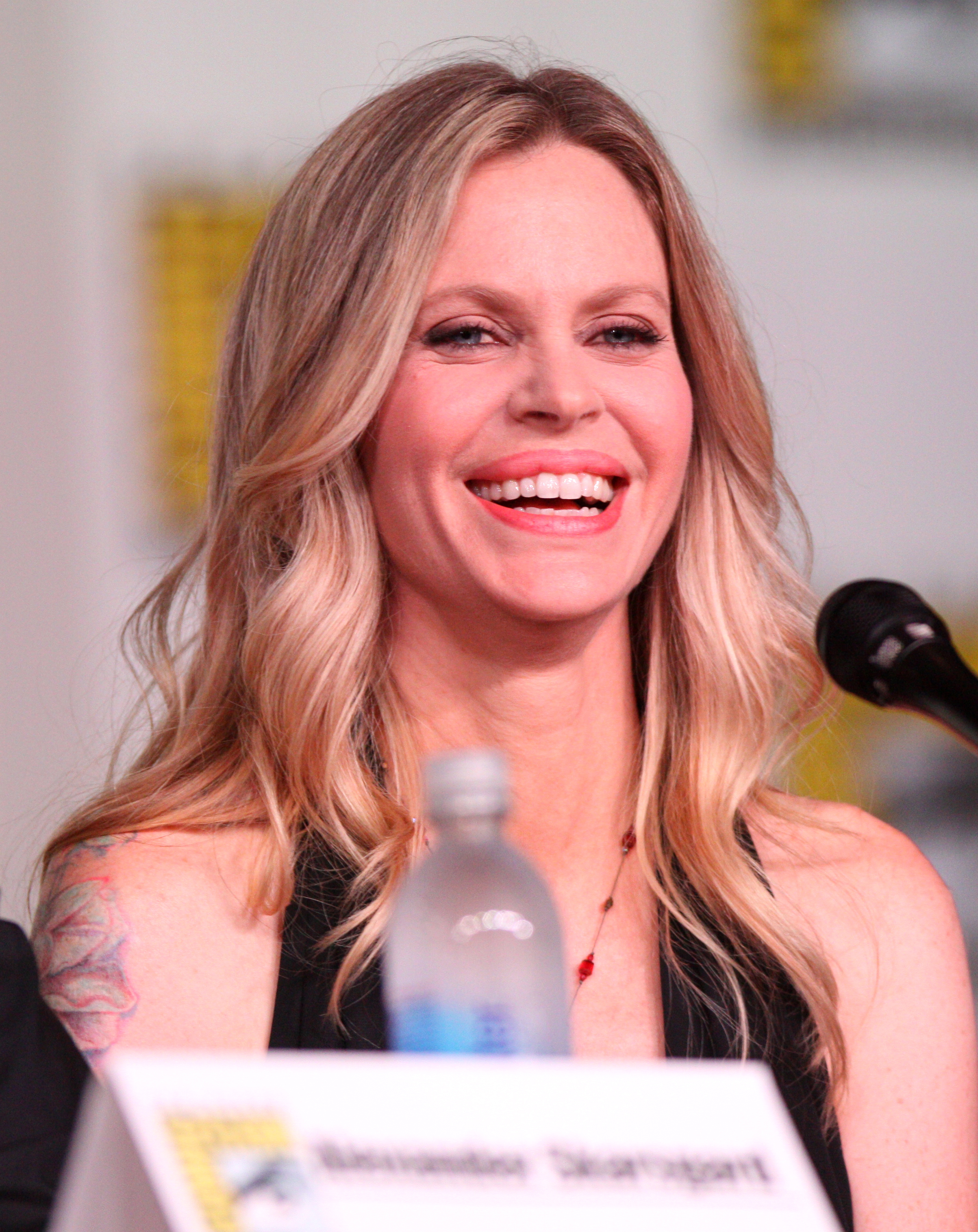
Bauer van Straten at the 2012 San Diego Comic-Con

In 1995, Bauer van Straten had her first regular role in a television series, as Maggie Reynolds on The Crew. Other recurring roles include Geneva Renault in Total Security, Candy Cooper in That's Life, Rebecca Colfax in Dirty Sexy Money, and Belinda Slypich in Hidden Hills. Perhaps her best known film role was in Dancing at the Blue Iguana in 2000. Bauer van Straten played a porn star appearing as the featured act at a Los Angeles strip club and performed an extended nude dance.

In 2001, she starred in the award-winning short film Room 302, and in 2004 she had a minor role in the film 50 First Dates, which starred Adam Sandler. In the animated series Justice League, she supplied the voice of the superhero Mera.

She has also made a number of guest appearances in several television shows, including L.A. Law, Seinfeld, Everybody Loves Raymond, Dark Angel, Two and a Half Men, Star Trek: Enterprise, CSI: Crime Scene Investigation, Desperate Housewives, and George Lopez. She famously appeared in a Seinfeld episode (The Bizarro Jerry) as Gillian, Jerry's girlfriend with "man hands", although the actual "man hands", seen only in close-ups, belonged to a member of the production crew.

From 2008 to its conclusion in 2014, Bauer van Straten played the vampire Pamela Swynford De Beaufort on the HBO fantasy drama series, True Blood. On December 8, 2009, TV Guide confirmed she had been promoted from recurring status to a series regular.

In 2011, she was cast in the fantasy television series Once Upon a Time as the evil fairy Maleficent (the wicked fairy godmother, using the name from Disney's Sleeping Beauty), the rival of the Evil Queen of Snow White.

== Activism ==
Bauer van Straten carries out conservation work to improve the treatment of animals. In 2011, she teamed with the Animal Legal Defense Fund in an unsuccessful fight to release Tony, a Siberian-Bengal tiger who has been kept as a roadside attraction at the Tiger Truck Stop in Grosse Tête, Louisiana since 2000. She worked with Physicians Committee for Responsible Medicine to promote cosmetics that are not tested on animals. She is a vegan and has used her platform to support shelter animals by promoting adoption.

Bauer van Straten also encourages people to live more sustainably and be more eco-friendly.

== Filmography ==
=== Film ===
Year	Title	Role	Notes
1995	Galaxis	Commander	
1995	Glory Daze	Dina	
1997	Romy and Michele's High School Reunion	Kelly Possenger	
1998	My Little Havana	Carmen	Short film
2000	Dancing at the Blue Iguana	Nico	
2001	Hollywood Palms	Kathleen	
2001	Room 302	Karen	Short film
2004	50 First Dates	Female Firefighter	
2004	Living with Lou	Jean	Short film
2005	Life of the Party	Caroline	
2011	Subject: I Love You	Sarah Drake	
2012	Gotten	Mother	Video short
2012	The Story of Luke	Cindy	
2014	Teen Lust	Mary	
2016	Nocturnal Animals	Samantha Van Helsing	
2018	Suicide Squad: Hell to Pay	Crystal Frost/Killer Frost	Voice, direct-to-video
2018	Happy Anniversary	Willa	
2018	Rich Boy, Rich Girl	Jessica Debenedetto	
2020	The Boy Behind the Door	Ms. Burton	
2021	Paradise Cove	Bree	

=== Television ===
Year	Title	Role	Notes
1993	Star Trek: Deep Space Nine	Blond Girl (uncredited)	Episode: "If Wishes Were Horses"
1994	L.A. Law	Miss English	Episode: "McKenzie, Brackman, Barnum & Bailey"
1994	Columbo	Suzie Endicott	Episode: "Undercover"
1994	Lois & Clark: The New Adventures of Superman	Mrs. Loomis	Episode: "The Prankster"
1994	Silk Stalkings	Heather St. Clair	Episode: "Red Flag"
1995	Cybill	Kirsten	Episode: "The Curse of Zoey"
1995	Pointman	Ellie	3 episodes
1995–1996	The Crew	Maggie Reynolds	Main role; 21 episodes
1996	Seinfeld	Gillian	Episode: "The Bizarro Jerry"
1997	Everybody Loves Raymond	Lisa	Episode: "The Car"
1997	Men Behaving Badly	Robin	Episode: "I Am What I Am"
1997	Total Security	Geneva Renault	Main role; 13 episodes
1998	Fantasy Island	Tamara Stevens	Episode: "Estrogen"
1998	Chicago Hope	Melody Cacaci	Episode: "Viagra-Vated Assault"
2000	Kiss Tomorrow Goodbye	Katy Scott	Television film
2000	Dark Angel	Lydia Meyerson	Episode: "Pilot"
2000–2001	That's Life	Candy Cooper	Recurring role; 12 episodes
2001	Dharma & Greg	Stephanie	Episode: "Dharma Does Dallas"
2001	Just Shoot Me!	Allie	2 episodes
2001–2003	Justice League	Mera	Voice, 2 episodes
2002	Boomtown	Prostitute	Episode: "Pilot"
2002	Hidden Hills	Belinda Slypich	Recurring role; 10 episodes
2003	Gary the Rat	Unknown	Voice, episode: "Manrattan"
2003	Two and a Half Men	Laura	2 episodes
2004	Dr. Vegas	Portia	Episode: "Pilot"
2004	Commando Nanny	Lizzie Winter	Television series
2004	Quintuplets	Ms. Kilcoyne	Episode: "Teacher's Pet"
2004	Crossing Jordan	Molly Greene	Episode: "Fire in the Sky"
2005	Crazy	Unknown	Television film
2005	JAG	Megan Ransford	Episode: "Automatic for the People"
2005	Star Trek: Enterprise	Lt. Laneth	Episode: "Divergence"
2005	Less than Perfect	Kaye Buchinski	Episode: "Casey V. Kronsky"
2005	Close to Home	Shannon Cooke	Episode: "Suburban Prostitution"
2005	CSI: Crime Scene Investigation	Kenli Johnson	Episode: "Secrets & Flies"
2005	Boston Legal	Tori Pines	Episode: "The Ass Fat Jungle"
2006	Pink Collar	Eve	Television film
2006	Crossing Jordan	Molly Greene	Episode: "Death Toll"
2006	Desperate Housewives	Veronica	Episode: "Could I Leave You?"
2006	Cold Case	Paula '04/'06	Episode: "The War at Home"
2007	George Lopez	Cris Watson	Episode: "George Joins the Neighborhood Wha-tcha and Raises the Vigil-ante"
2007	Dirty Sexy Money	Rebecca Colfax	2 episodes
2007	Bones	Janelle Stinson	Episode: "Boy in the Time Capsule"
2008	Emily's Reasons Why Not	Bethany	Episode: "Why Not to Cheat on Your Best Friend"
2008–2014	True Blood	Pamela Swynford De Beaufort	Recurring role (seasons 1–2), Main role (season 3–7); 59 episodes
2009	House Rules	Kathy McAdams	Television film
2009	Private Practice	Susanna	Episode: "Pushing the Limits"
2009	Three Rivers	Val O'Leary	Episode: "Where We Lie"
2010	Justified	Shirley Kelso	Episode: "Riverbrook"
2010	A Drop of True Blood	Pamela Swynford De Beaufort	Episode: "Eric & Pam"
2010–2013	The Secret Life of the American Teenager	Didi Stone	Recurring role; 11 episodes
2011	The Soup	Pam the Intern	Episode: "8.25"
2011–2015	Once Upon a Time	Maleficent	Season 1 (2 episodes), season 4 (8 episodes)
2013	Once Upon a Time in Wonderland	Maleficent	Voice, episode: "Forget Me Not"
2014	Saint George	Suzanne Duval	Episode: "Rich Girl"
2017	Lore	Minnie Otto	Episode: "Unboxed"
2019	Adam Ruins Everything	TV Network Executive	Episode: "Adam Ruins Himself"
2020	Sacred Lies	Shannon	Main role; 8 episodes

=== Music videos ===
Year	Title	Artist(s)	Role	Ref.
2012	"Gotten"	Slash featuring Adam Levine	Joanna's Mother	
2018	"Trouble Man"	Chris Pierce	Herself	

=== Podcasts ===
Year	Title	Role	Notes
2021	Bridgewater	Celeste	
2021-2024	Truest Blood	Host	With co-host Deborah Ann Woll
