= Dirty Little Secrets (Once Upon a Time in Wonderland) =

- Once Upon a Time in Wonderland episode
- Episode no.: Season 1 Episode 10
- Directed by: Alex Zakrzewski
- Written by: Adam Nussdorf & Rina Mimoun
- Original air date: March 13, 2014

Guest appearances
- Leah Gibson as Nyx; Raza Jaffrey as Taj; Dejan Loyola as Rafi; Peta Sergeant as Jabberwocky; Zuleikha Robinson as Amara; Ben Cotton as Tweedle #2; Fabian Gujral as Thug #1; Balinder Johal as Healer; Arkie Kandola as Bartender; Christopher Logan as Thug #2; Kalvin Olafson as Villager; Benjamin Wilkinson as White Knight

Episode chronology
← Previous "Nothing to Fear"	Next → "Heart of the Matter"

"Dirty Little Secrets" is the tenth episode of the Once Upon a Time spin-off series Once Upon a Time in Wonderland.

== Plot ==
Cyrus recalls the events that led to the binding price he and his brothers had to pay. Meanwhile, the Red Queen and the Knave are forced to confront the Jabberwocky.

== Production ==
Adam Nussdorf & Rina Mimoun were the writers for the episode, while Alex Zakrzewski was its director.

== Reception ==
=== Ratings ===
The episode was watched by 3.22 million American viewers, and received an 18-49 rating/share of 0.8/3, roughly the same total viewers number as the previous episode but down in the demo. The show placed fourth in its timeslot and fourteenth for the night.

=== Critical reception ===
Christine Orlando of TV Fanatic gave the episode a 4.5 out of 5, signaling positive reviews.

Ashley B. of Spoiler TV gave the episode a positive review. She said:

I was originally not terribly intrigued by the idea of this episode, especially since it was supposed to focus on Cyrus and I feel he is the least interesting of the characters. That being said, I enjoyed that this episode showed Cyrus's temper and the arrogance that was held at bay by the genie enchantment, creeping in around the edges. Also, the Red Queen's scenes with the Jabberwocky were cringe-worthy in the best kind of way. On the whole, this episode was a pleasant surprise and really displayed how high the stakes actually are in Wonderland. With only three episodes left in the season, who knows if good will be able to triumph over evil.
