= Bad Blood (2011 film) =

- Film poster
- Directed by: Michael Yebba
- Written by: Michael Yebba
- Starring: Slaine; Michael Yebba; Evalena Marie
- Production company: Bostown Entertainment
- Release date: 2011
- Running time: 86 minutes
- Country: United States
- Language: English

Bad Blood is an American drama film, written and directed by Michael Yebba. The film stars Slaine as Billy Brand, Michael Yebba as Noel Brand, and Evalena Marie as Jill Brand. It was produced for Bostown Entertainment by Christophe Petit and Michael Yebba.

== Accolades ==
- 2011 Los Angeles Movie Awards – Honorable Mention
- 2011 Woods Hole Film Festival – Official Selection
- 2011 Bel-Air Film Festival – Official Selection
- 2011 Long Island Film Expo – Nominated Best Short Film/Best Director

== Cast ==
- Billy Brand – Slaine
- Noel Brand – Michael Yebba
- Jill Brand – Evalena Marie

== Production ==
- Christophe Petit – Producer
- Michael Yebba – Producer
