= Jerome Schwartz =

American television and film write and producer

- Born: Portland, Oregon
- Occupations: Television and film writer, producer
- Years active: 2002 - present

Jerome Schwartz is an American television and film writer and producer.

He is well known for his work on the ABC fantasy series Once Upon a Time; as well as for its spin-off Once Upon a Time in Wonderland.

== Life and career ==
He grew up in Bellingham, Washington. He attended Whitman College, graduating with a double major in theatre and English literature. He traveled the world after graduation, before settling in Los Angeles. He started off as a clerical assistant on the NBC series The Office. His girlfriend at the time passed his resume to producers at CBS's Cold Case, and he was hired as a writers production assistant. He was later promoted to research assistant.

In 2010, Schwartz co-wrote his first film with director Cullen Hoback, Friction. A film that blurs the line between fiction and documentary. He'd go on to write for short lived series Chase and Zero Hour.

=== Once Upon a Time ===
After Zack Estrin was hired as showrunner for the ABC series Once Upon a Time's new spinoff Once Upon a Time in Wonderland by Edward Kitsis, Jane Espenson and Adam Horowitz; he brought Schwartz on, since establishing a rapport with him on Zero Hour. When Wonderland wasn't renewed for a second season; Schwartz became the only crew member to shift over to the mother series, joining its fourth year. Schwartz has contributed some notable episodes of the series such as: "Rocky Road," "Smash the Mirror," "The Broken Kingdom," and "Birth."

=== The Fix ===
Schwartz wrote one episode of The Fix entitled: "The Wire"

=== Emergence ===
Schwartz wrote one episode of Emergence entitled: "No Outlet"
