= Heather Doerksen =

Canadian actress

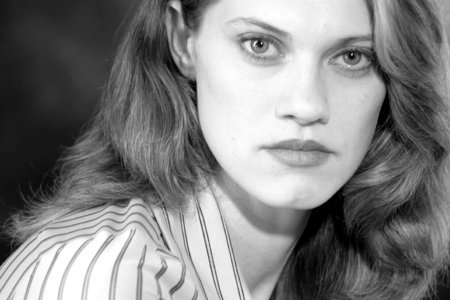
- Doerksen in 2007
- Born: February 12, 1980 (age 46); Winnipeg, Manitoba, Canada
- Education: Simon Fraser University
- Occupations: Actress and voice actress
- Years active: 2004-present
- Website: www.heatherdoerksen.com

Heather Doerksen /ˈdɜːrksɪn/ (born February 12, 1980) is a Canadian actress who has appeared on stage and screen. She has also voiced many cartoons and advertising campaigns.

== Career ==
Doerksen studied at Simon Fraser University, switching majors from science to theatre. Doerksen has played in a number of small television and film roles. Her most notable roles include Sasha Kaidanovsky in Pacific Rim, Sarah in Once Upon a Time in Wonderland, and Captain Pat Meyers on Stargate: Atlantis.

== Filmography ==
=== Film ===
Year	Title	Role	Notes
2006	The Barbie Diaries	Stephanie (voice)	Direct-to-video
2006	Last Day	Heather	Short film
2008	The Eye	Sickly Woman	
2008	Barbie & the Diamond Castle	Phaedra, Waitress (voices)	Direct-to-video
2008	The Lost Treasure of the Grand Canyon	Hildy Wainwright	Television film
2008	The Day the Earth Stood Still	Regina's Aide	
2008	Holly Hobbie & Friends: Fabulous Fashion Show	Aunt Jesse (voice)	Direct-to-video
2009	The Uninvited	Mildred Kemp	
2009	Holly Hobbie & Friends: Marvelous Makeover	Aunt Jesse, Coach (voices)	Direct-to-video
2010	Marmaduke	Female Executive	
2010	The Client List	Tanya	Television film
2011	Alchemy and Other Imperfections	Lead Woman	Short film
2011	In the Name of the King 2: Two Worlds	Dunyana	
2012	Ambrosia	Sarah	
2012	The Cabin in the Woods	Accountant	
2012	Indie Jonesing	Charlene	
2012	Abducted: The Carlina White Story	Agent Thompson	
2012	Anything But Christmas	Charlene	Television film
2013	Pacific Rim	Lt. Sasha Kaidonovsky	
2014	Big Eyes	Gossipy Woman #1	
2015	Hidden	Jillian	
2015	All of My Heart	Casey	Television film
2016	All Things Valentines	Hannah	Television film
2017	All of My Heart: Inn Love	Casey	Television film
2018	All of My Heart: The Wedding	Casey	Television film

=== Television ===
Year	Title	Role	Notes
2005, 2007–2008	Smallville	Isis Receptionist, Martha's Aide, Receptionist	4 episodes
2005–2006, 2008	The L Word	Karen, Waitress, Woman with Clipboard	3 episodes
2005–2007	Stargate: Atlantis	Captain Pat Meyers	6 episodes
2005, 2008	Battlestar Galactica	Sgt. Brandy Harder	4 episodes
2006	Blade: The Series	Kat	Episode: "Pilot"
2006	Kyle XY	Mrs. Preston	Episode: "Diving In"
2006	Three Moons Over Milford	Bonnie Fitzgerald	Episode: "Confessions of a Dangerous Moon"
2007	Supernatural	Gloria Sidnick	Episode: "House of the Holy"
2008	Death Note	Kiyomi Takada (voice)	English dub, 6 episodes
2009	Knights of Bloodsteel	Orion	2 episodes
2009	Nana	Ms. Sakagami, Nao (voices)	English dub; 2 episodes
2010–2011	Fringe	Major Warner	4 episodes
2012	True Justice	Veronica	Episode: "The Shot"
2013	Ultimate Wolverine vs. Hulk	Betty Ross / She-Hulk (voice)	7 episodes
2013–2014	Once Upon a Time in Wonderland	Sarah	3 episodes
2014	Wolverine versus Sabretooth	Silver Fox, Psylocke, Thornn, Emma Frost (voices)	6 episodes
2014	Eternals	Abi, Zeebee, Mimi, Archive (voices)	10 episodes
2014	Lego Star Wars: The Yoda Chronicles	Princess Leia, Mon Mothma (voices)	4 episodes
2015	Lego Star Wars: Droid Tales	Princess Leia, Mon Mothma, Shmi Skywalker (voices)	4 episodes
2015–2022	Ninjago	Skylor Chen (voice)	33 episodes
2017	Nexo Knights	Ruina Stoneheart (voice)	Supporting antagonist
2017–2018	Dinotrux	Snowblazer, Xee (voices)	Episode: "Snowblazer, Xee, Seasons 7-8"
2018	Take Two	Syd	3 episodes
2018	Chilling Adventures of Sabrina	Gryla	Episode: "Chapter Eleven: A Midwinter's Tale"
2018	Colony	Janet	Episode: "Puzzle Man"
2019–2021	Van Helsing	Michaela	Recurring role (season 4); Main role (season 5)
2019–2022	Gigantosaurus	Hegan / Rugosodon	
2021	Charmed	Aladria	5 episodes
2021	Gabby Duran & the Unsittables	D.U.M.B. Leader	Episode: "The Fault in Our Star Night"
2023	So Help Me Todd	Sofie Keller	Episode: "86'd"
2023	Fourth Down and Love	Danielle Hanson	Television film
2024	Resident Alien	April	Episode: "141 Seconds"

=== Video games ===
Year	Title	Role	Notes
2010	Dead Rising 2	Amber Bailey, Survivors	
2011	Dead Rising 2: Off the Record	Amber Bailey, Survivors	
