= Zack Estrin =

American television producer and screenwriter (1970/1971–2022)

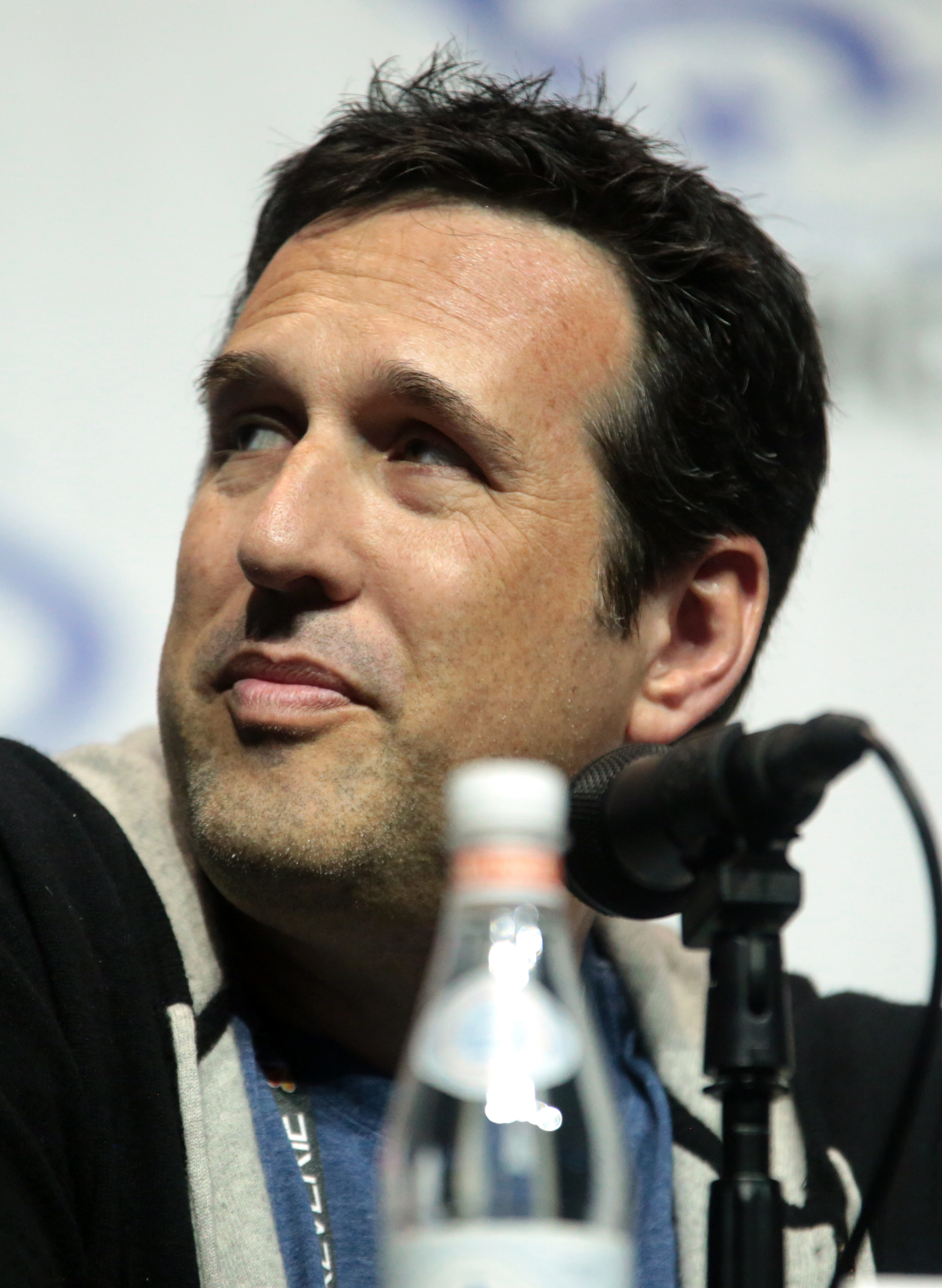
- Estrin at WonderCon 2018
- Born: September 16, 1971; Woodland, California, U.S.
- Died: September 23, 2022 (aged 51); Hermosa Beach, California, U.S.
- Occupation: Television producer; screenwriter
- Education: University of Southern California
- Spouse: Kari
- Children: 2

Zack Estrin (September 16, 1971 – September 23, 2022) was an American television producer and screenwriter.

Estrin began his career as a writer and producer on Charmed, Dawson's Creek, and Tru Calling, before serving as a co-executive producer of Prison Break. He was set to write the script of an ultimately unproduced spin-off, Prison Break: Cherry Hill, along with Prison Break's executive producer Matt Olmstead, both of whom conceived the idea for the spin-off with fellow executive producer, Dawn Parouse. He was also a producer on the film Stranger than Fiction.

From 2018 to 2021, he served as showrunner on the Netflix show Lost in Space.

== Personal life and death ==
Estrin was born in Woodland, California, and raised in Brooklyn, New York. His father, Jonathan, was also a screenwriter.

Estrin attended the University of Southern California. He and his wife, Kari, had two daughters.

On September 23, 2022, Estrin died while jogging in Hermosa Beach, California, after apparently going into cardiac arrest. He was 51, and was not known to be ill.
