= Once Upon a Time (TV series) =

American fantasy adventure television series (2011–2018)

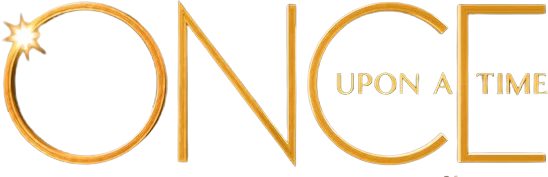
- Genre: Adventure; Drama; Fantasy
- Created by: Edward Kitsis; Adam Horowitz
- Showrunners: Edward Kitsis; Adam Horowitz
- Starring: Ginnifer Goodwin; Jennifer Morrison; Lana Parrilla; Josh Dallas; Jared S. Gilmore; Raphael Sbarge; Jamie Dornan; Robert Carlyle; Eion Bailey; Emilie de Ravin; Meghan Ory; Colin O'Donoghue; Michael Raymond-James; Michael Socha; Rebecca Mader; Sean Maguire; Andrew J. West; Dania Ramirez; Gabrielle Anwar; Alison Fernandez; Mekia Cox
- Composers: Mark Isham; Cindy O'Connor (season 7); Michael D. Simon (season 7)
- Country of origin: United States
- Original language: English
- No. of seasons: 7
- No. of episodes: 155 (list of episodes)

Production
- Executive producers: Edward Kitsis; Adam Horowitz; Steve Pearlman; David H. Goodman; Andrew Chambliss
- Producers: Damon Lindelof; Christine Boylan; Robert Hull; Kalinda Vazquez; Jane Espenson; Daniel T. Thomsen; Brian Wankum; Kathy Gilroy; Ian Goldberg; Liz Tigelaar; Samantha Thomas; Jerome Schwartz; Helga Ungurait
- Production locations: Steveston, British Columbia; Vancouver, British Columbia
- Cinematography: Steven Fierberg; Stephen Jackson; Tony Mirza
- Editors: Geofrey Hildrew; Mark Goldman; Scot J. Kelly; Joe Talbot Hall
- Running time: 43 minutes (Note: The season four episode "Smash the Mirror" runs for 87 minutes.)
- Production companies: ABC Studios; Kitsis/Horowitz

Original release
- Network: ABC
- Release: October 23, 2011 – May 18, 2018

Related
- Once Upon a Time in Wonderland

Once Upon a Time is an American fantasy drama television series that aired for seven seasons on ABC from October 23, 2011, to May 18, 2018. The action alternates between two main settings: a fantastical world where fairy tales happen and a fictional seaside town in Maine called Storybrooke. The "real world" part of the story unfolds with the characters of Emma Swan (Jennifer Morrison) and her 10-year-old son, Henry Mills (Jared S. Gilmore). Henry discovers the other people of the town are fairy-tale characters. The audience is shown the backstory of the town's people as fairy-tale characters, in conjunction with their unfolding stories in the "real-world". In the seventh and final season, the "real-world" portion of the story takes place in Seattle, Washington, in the fictitious neighborhood of "Hyperion Heights", with a new main narrative led by adult Henry (Andrew J. West), and his wife and daughter.

Once Upon a Time was created by Lost and Tron: Legacy writers Edward Kitsis and Adam Horowitz. Horowitz told The Hollywood Reporter that they had a conscious purpose to "do a show that had optimism at its heart", as they "felt like there was so much darkness in the world". Kitsis said: "We are guys who like to see the world as half-full, not half-empty", and it's about "seeing that among all the trials and tribulations of life, you can persevere and find light among the darkness"; "it's that ability to think your life will get better". Star Jennifer Morrison told the Calgary Herald that it's a show about hope and positivity and connectivity, which "encourages people to believe in themselves and believe in the best versions of themselves and to have hope to have the life that they have."

A spin-off series, Once Upon a Time in Wonderland, consisting of 13 episodes featuring the title character of the 1865 novel Alice's Adventures in Wonderland by Lewis Carroll, premiered on October 10, 2013, and concluded on April 3, 2014.

== Premise ==
Once Upon a Time is primarily set in the fictional seaside town of Storybrooke, Maine, in which the residents are fairy tale characters that were transported to the real world town and robbed of their memories by Regina, the Evil Queen (Lana Parrilla), who used a powerful dark curse obtained from Rumplestiltskin (Robert Carlyle). The residents of Storybrooke, where Regina is mayor, have lived an unchanging existence for 28 years, unaware of their agelessness and their past lives. The town's only hope lies with a bail bond agent named Emma Swan (Jennifer Morrison), who is the daughter of Snow White (Ginnifer Goodwin) and Prince Charming (Josh Dallas). Emma was transported from the Enchanted Forest to the real world via a magic wardrobe as an infant before the curse was cast. As such, she is the Savior, the only person who can break the curse and restore everyone's lost memories. Emma is aided by her ten-year-old son, Henry Mills (Jared S. Gilmore), who she had given up for adoption upon his birth, and his Once Upon a Time book of fairy tales that holds the key to breaking the curse. Henry is also Regina's adopted son, providing a source of both conflict and common interest between the two women.

Episodes usually have one segment that details the characters' past lives which, when serialized, adds a piece to the puzzle about the characters and their connection to the events that preceded the curse. The other segment, set in the present day, follows a similar pattern with a different outcome, but also offers similar insights.

== Series overview ==
In the first season, the Evil Queen interrupts the wedding of Snow White and Prince Charming to announce that she will cast a curse on everyone that will leave her with the only happy ending. As a result, the majority of characters are transported to the town of Storybrooke, Maine, where most of them have been stripped of their memories and identities. On her 28th birthday, Emma Swan, the daughter of Snow White and Prince Charming, is brought to Storybrooke by her biological son Henry Mills in the hopes of breaking the curse cast by his adoptive mother, Regina Mills–the Evil Queen.

In the second season, despite Emma having broken the curse, the characters are not returned to the fairy tale world and must deal with their own dual identities. With the introduction of magic into Storybrooke by Rumplestiltskin, the fates of the two worlds become intertwined, and new threats emerge in the form of Killian Jones / Captain Hook (Colin O'Donoghue), Regina's mother Cora (Barbara Hershey), and sinister operatives Greg Mendell (Ethan Embry) and Tamara (Sonequa Martin-Green) from the real world with an agenda to destroy magic.

In the third season, the main characters travel to Neverland to rescue Henry, who has been kidnapped by Peter Pan (Robbie Kay) as part of a plan to obtain the "Heart of the Truest Believer" from him. Their increasing power struggle with Pan continues in Storybrooke, which results in the reversal of the original curse. All the characters are returned to their original worlds, leaving Emma and Henry to escape to New York City. The characters are brought back to a recreated Storybrooke with their memories of the previous year removed, and the envious Zelena, the Wicked Witch of the West (Rebecca Mader) from Oz, appears with a plan to change the past, prompting Emma and Henry to return.

In the fourth season, Emma and Hook's time travel adventures lead to the accidental arrival of Elsa (Georgina Haig) from the Enchanted Forest of the past to present-day Storybrooke. In the search for her younger sister Anna (Elizabeth Lail) with the aid of the town's residents, Elsa encounter her and Anna's aunt Ingrid, the Snow Queen (Elizabeth Mitchell). Meanwhile, Regina seeks the author of Henry's Once Upon a Time book so that she can have her happy ending. Later on, a banished Rumplestiltskin returns with the help of Cruella de Vil (Victoria Smurfit), Maleficent (Kristin Bauer van Straten), and Ursula (Merrin Dungey), carrying out his plans to rewrite the rules governing the fates of all heroes and villains. Henry and Emma race to restore reality and the truth before the twisted inversion becomes permanent.

In the fifth season, the characters embark on a quest to Camelot to find Merlin (Elliot Knight) and free Emma from the powers of an ancient darkness. To complicate matters, King Arthur (Liam Garrigan) sets out to alter the balance between light and darkness using Excalibur and the help of a vengeful Zelena. A tragic loss forces Emma to lead a rescue party to the Underworld, where they encounters souls of those with unfinished business and face the conniving Hades (Greg Germann). The characters' dangerous manipulations of magic lead to the separation of Regina and her Evil Queen persona, as well as the arrival of Dr. Jekyll (Hank Harris) and Mr. Hyde (Sam Witwer).

In the sixth season, the residents of Storybrooke set out to protect the town from the combined threat of Mr. Hyde and an unleashed Evil Queen, as well as dealing with new arrivals from the Land of Untold Stories. Emma's destiny as the Savior weighs heavily on her, and her desperation to alter her fate leads to revelations about a mysterious new arrival, Aladdin (Deniz Akdeniz). The war between light and darkness leads to the arrival of the Black Fairy (Jaime Murray) as well as the final battle that was prophesied before the casting of the original curse.

In the seventh and final season, years after the final battle, Lucy (Alison Fernandez) arrives in the fictional neighborhood of Hyperion Heights in Seattle, Washington with her Once Upon a Time book to find her now-adult father Henry (Andrew J. West), who is needed by his family. Henry, along with characters from the New Enchanted Forest, have been brought to the neighborhood under a new curse and are caught in a rising conflict involving Cinderella (Dania Ramirez), Lady Tremaine (Gabrielle Anwar), and Drizella (Adelaide Kane). Their dangerous history with Mother Gothel (Emma Booth) is revealed as do the agendas of Dr. Facilier (Daniel Francis). Lucy must try to break this new curse and free her parents with the help of the now-cursed Regina, Wish Realm (Note: The Wish Realm is a world created via a genie wish and is populated with alternate versions of the characters, first seen in the season six episode "Wish You Were Here".) Hook, Rumplestiltskin and Zelena. As they succeed in breaking the curse, the arrival of Wish Realm Rumplestiltskin with a plot to condemn every hero into eternal unhappiness leads to an ultimate sacrifice to save their happily ever after.

== Episodes ==
Season	Episodes	Originally released		Viewers (millions)	Viewers rank	18–49 rating/share	18-49 rank
Season	Episodes	First released	Last released	Viewers (millions)	Viewers rank	18–49 rating/share	18-49 rank
1	22	October 23, 2011	May 13, 2012	11.71	28	4.1/10	18
2	22	September 30, 2012	May 12, 2013	10.24	35	3.6/9	18
3	22	September 29, 2013	May 11, 2014	9.38	35	4.2/8	12
4	22	September 28, 2014	May 10, 2015	8.98	50	3.2/7	17
5	23	September 27, 2015	May 15, 2016	6.32	69	2.2	34
6	22	September 25, 2016	May 14, 2017	4.39	105	1.5/5	70
7	22	October 6, 2017	May 18, 2018	3.41	120	0.9	115

== Cast ==
- Ginnifer Goodwin as Snow White / Mary Margaret Blanchard (seasons 1–6; special guest season 7)
- Jennifer Morrison as Emma Swan (seasons 1–6; special guest season 7)
- Lana Parrilla as the Evil Queen / Regina Mills / Roni
- Josh Dallas as Prince Charming / David Nolan (seasons 1–6; special guest season 7)
- Jared S. Gilmore (seasons 1–6; recurring season 7) and Andrew J. West (season 7; guest season 6) as Henry Mills
- Raphael Sbarge as Jiminy Cricket / Dr. Archibald Hopper (season 1; recurring seasons 2–3 and 6; guest seasons 4 and 7)
- Jamie Dornan as the Huntsman / Sheriff Graham Humbert (season 1; guest season 2)
- Robert Carlyle as Rumplestiltskin / Mr. Gold / Weaver
- Eion Bailey as Pinocchio / August Wayne Booth (season 1; recurring season 4; guest seasons 2 and 6)
- Emilie de Ravin as Belle / Lacey (seasons 2–6; recurring season 1; special guest season 7)
- Meghan Ory as Red Riding Hood / Ruby (season 2; recurring seasons 1, 3 and 5)
- Colin O'Donoghue as Killian Jones / Captain Hook / Rogers (season 2–7)
- Michael Raymond-James as Baelfire / Neal Cassidy (season 3; recurring season 2; guest season 5)
- Michael Socha as Will Scarlet / Knave of Hearts / White King (season 4)
- Rebecca Mader as Zelena / the Wicked Witch of the West / Kelly West (seasons 5–6; recurring seasons 3–4 and 7)
- Sean Maguire as Robin Hood (season 5; recurring seasons 3–4 and 6; guest season 7)
- Jessy Schram as Cinderella / Jacinda Vidrio (season 7)
- Gabrielle Anwar as Rapunzel / Lady Tremaine / Victoria Belfrey (season 7)
- Alison Fernandez as Lucy (season 7; guest season 6)
- Mekia Cox as Tiana / Sabine (season 7)

== Development and production ==
=== Conception ===
Adam Horowitz and Edward Kitsis conceived Once Upon a Time in 2004 before joining the writing staff of Lost but wanted to wait until that series was over to focus on this project.

The idea is to take these characters that we all know collectively and try to find things about them that we haven't explored before. Sometimes it's a story point, sometimes it's a thematic connection, sometimes it's a dilemma they face in both worlds that is similar. We are not generally retelling the same story as the fairy tale world.

— Executive producer Adam Horowitz

Eight years before the pilot began development (the two had just completed their work on Felicity, in 2002), Kitsis and Horowitz became inspired to write fairy tales out of a love of "mystery and excitement of exploring lots of different worlds." They presented the premise to numerous networks, but were refused due to its fantastical nature. From their time on Lost, the writers learned to look at the story differently, namely that "character has to trump mythology."

They explained,

As people, you've got to see what the void in their heart or their lives is to care about them ... For us, this was as much about the character journeys and seeing what was ripped from them in coming to Storybrooke – going at it that way as opposed to making it the 'break-the-curse show.'

Despite the comparisons and similarities to Lost, the writers intend them to be very different shows. To them, Lost concerned itself with redemption, while Once Upon a Time is about "hope". Lost co-creator Damon Lindelof aided in the development of the series as an uncredited consultant. Kitsis and Horowitz called him a "godfather" to the series. To differentiate the storytelling from what the audience already knew, the writing staff decided to begin the pilot with the end of the typical Snow White fairytale. Themes concerning family and motherhood were emphasized, in contrast to the focus on fatherhood in Lost. Kitsis and Horowitz sought to write strong female characters, rather than the classic damsel in distress. Horowitz stated their desire to approach each character the same way, asking themselves, "How do we make these icons real, make them relatable?"

The pilot is meant to be the "template of the series". Kitsis confirmed that every week will contain flashbacks between both worlds, as they "love the idea of going back and forth and informing what the character is missing in their life." The writers' desire to present a "mash up" of many small characters can be seen in a scene of the pilot, in which there is a war council featuring Geppetto, Pinocchio, and Grumpy. Horowitz elaborated, "One of the fun things for us coming up with these stories is thinking of ways these different characters can interact in ways they never have before." Since then, the showrunners have added more elements, and given its ties to Disney, have expanded the universe to include more recent material, by throwing out hints that they might look ahead at incorporating characters from Brave and Frozen in future seasons, if they get the green light from Disney. The characters from Frozen and Brave ultimately appeared as supporting characters in the fourth and fifth seasons, respectively.

The general premise, importing the Snow White core characters into the "real world", was previously seen on ABC television in the short-lived 1980s comedy The Charmings. The show also has a similar premise to Bill Willingham's ten-year-old comic series Fables, to which ABC bought the rights in 2008 but never made it past planning stages. After Fables fans raised controversy over possible appropriation, the show writers initially denied a link, but later said they may have "read a couple of issues" of the comic book and while the two concepts are "in the same playground", they are "telling a different story." Bill Willingham responded to the controversy in an interview, where he stated he did not feel the show was plagiarism and said: "Maybe they did remember reading Fables back then, but didn't want to mention it because we've become a very litigious people."

=== Casting ===
The cast as they appeared in the third season.

The secondary character casting director Samuel Forsyth started the casting process in 2010. Horowitz stated that everyone they initially wanted for roles in the series accepted their roles after being sent a script. Ginnifer Goodwin was cast as Snow White / Mary Margaret Blanchard, who appreciated that she would be playing a strong character that was fleshed out for the audience. Goodwin had stated in interviews that she would love to play Snow White, and called her acceptance of the role "a no-brainer." Both Kitsis and Horowitz are self-described big fans of Goodwin's previous series, Big Love, and wrote the part of Snow White with her in mind. Josh Dallas, who portrays Prince Charming / David Nolan, was pleased the writers took "some dramatic license" with his character, believing the prince had become more real. He explained,

Prince Charming just happens to be a name. He's still a man with the same emotions as any other man. He's a Prince, but he's a Prince of the people. He gets his hands dirty. He's got a kingdom to run. He has a family to protect. He has an epic, epic love for Snow White. He's like everybody else. He's human.

Jennifer Morrison was cast as Emma Swan. The actress explained her character as someone who "help[s] her son Henry whom she abandoned when he was a baby and who seems like he's a little bit emotionally dysfunctional", but noted that Emma does not start out believing in the fairytale universe. Ten-year-old Jared S. Gilmore, known for his work on Mad Men, took the role of her son, Henry. The role of the Evil Queen / Regina was given to Lana Parrilla.

"There's always two stories being told when playing Regina. There's the threat of her knowing she's an evil queen and then there's just the pure simple fact that the biological mother has stepped into her world and the threat of losing her son is just enormous. That's a fear that I think any adopted mother would have. I think that's going to help the audience relate to Regina in some level."

— Lana Parrilla

The role of Rumplestiltskin / Mr. Gold was given to Robert Carlyle, after having been written with him in mind, though the writers initially thought he would not accept the part. Horowitz recalled Carlyle's prison sequence, which was the actor's first day on the set as "mind-blowing ... You could see Ginny jump, the first time he did that character. It was fantastic!" Jamie Dornan portrayed the Huntsman / Sheriff Graham as a series regular until the character was killed off in the seventh episode (although he later appeared in the season finale as a guest star), while Eion Bailey was cast as Pinocchio / August Wayne Booth in a recurring role, starting with the ninth episode, "True North", where he was credited as "Stranger". He was promoted to series regular status for the fifteenth episode, "Red-Handed". Raphael Sbarge portrayed Jiminy Cricket / Dr. Archie Hopper.

For the second season, Meghan Ory and Emilie de Ravin were promoted to the main cast as Red Riding Hood / Ruby and Belle / Lacey respectively, while Bailey made guest appearances in two episodes and Sbarge joined the recurring cast. Colin O'Donoghue was cast as Captain Killian "Hook" Jones, initially in a recurring role, before being promoted to the main cast starting from the fourteenth episode. Additionally, Dornan made a guest appearance in the seventeenth episode.

For the third season, Michael Raymond-James was promoted to the main cast as Neal Cassidy, while Ory did not return as a regular due to commitments to the CBS series Intelligence. Ory continued to make recurring appearances throughout the season.

For the fourth season, Michael Socha was brought onto the series as Will Scarlet / Knave of Hearts from the spin-off Once Upon a Time in Wonderland, while Raymond-James exited the main cast after his character was killed off in the previous season. Bailey returned in a recurring arc towards the end of the season after being absent since the second.

For the fifth season, Rebecca Mader and Sean Maguire were promoted to the main cast as Zelena / Wicked Witch of the West and Robin Hood respectively, while Socha exited. Ory also returned in a recurring capacity after being absent since the third season. Additionally, Raymond-James made a guest appearance in the twelfth episode.

For the sixth season, Maguire exited the main cast after his character was killed off in the previous season, but remained in a recurring capacity as an alternate version of the character. Sbarge and Bailey also returned in recurring capacities, both having been absent since the fourth season.

The seventh and final season marked a major cast overhaul for the series, with Goodwin, Morrison, Dallas, Gilmore, De Ravin, and Mader all exiting the main cast. Gilmore and Mader joined the recurring cast for the season, while Goodwin, Morrison, Dallas, and De Ravin all made guest appearances, particularly in the finale. Along with departures, Andrew J. West and Alison Fernandez joined the main cast for the season as an older Henry and his daughter Lucy, respectively, after guest starring in the previous season's finale. Dania Ramirez and Gabrielle Anwar joined as new iterations of Cinderella and Lady Tremaine, respectively; Anwar exited after the eleventh episode, where her character was killed off. Mekia Cox, who portrays Tiana, was promoted to the main cast after initially joining as recurring. Additionally, Sbarge and Maguire made guest appearances in the finale.

=== Filming ===
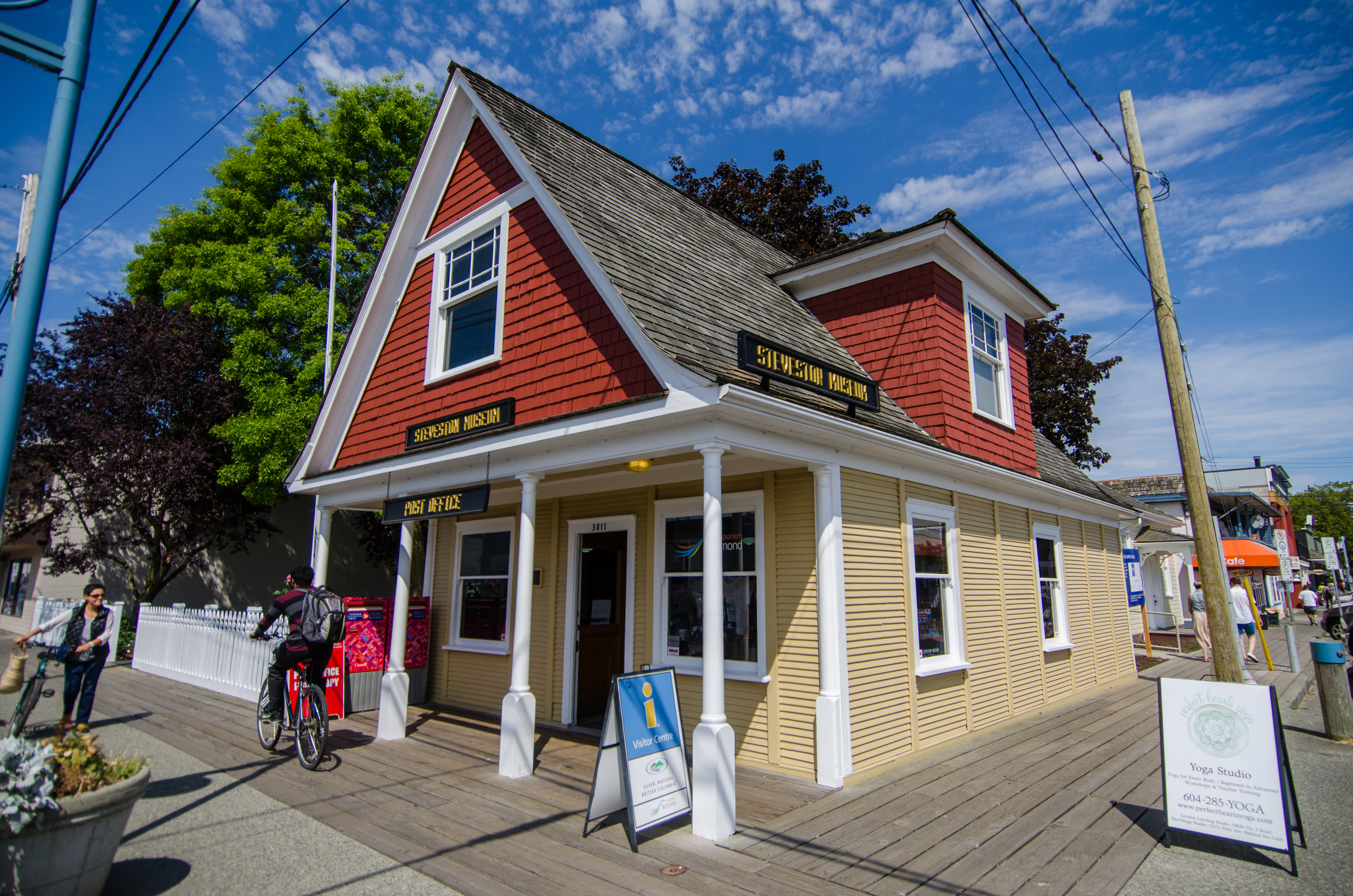
Steveston, British Columbia doubles as the town of Storybrooke, Maine.

Principal photography for the series takes place in Vancouver, British Columbia. The village of Steveston in the adjacent city of Richmond doubles as Storybrooke for the series, with props and exterior sets disguising the existing businesses and buildings. During filming, all brightly colored objects (flowers, etc.) are hidden to reinforce the fictional town's spell-subdued character. Certain sets are additionally filmed in separate studios, including the interior of Mr. Gold's pawn shop and the clock tower, which are not found in Steveston. Downtown Vancouver doubles as other major cities such as New York City, Boston and Seattle.

== Setting ==
=== Main settings ===
During the first six seasons, the Enchanted Forest and Storybrooke, Maine are the main settings of the series. The Enchanted Forest is a realm within Fairy Tale Land, but the actual spread and scope of the realm are not known. However, they are later united during the Ogre Wars, which played a part in the formation of the War Council that is formed by Prince Charming and served as the catalyst in the backstories involving Rumplestiltskin and the Evil Queen. Several independent kingdoms are implied by an array of different rulers. Most of the stories detailed their earlier lives before ascension to power and being influenced by their mentors through their upbringings. Meanwhile, Storybrooke serves as an isolated town separated from the rest of the Land Without Magic, where the cursed inhabitants are trapped by various forces.

During the seventh season, the New Enchanted Forest and Hyperion Heights, Seattle are the main settings. As a realm in New Fairy Tale Land, the New Enchanted Forest is divided into several independent kingdoms with different rulers. The inhabitants conflict with each other, most notably between Lady Tremaine, Cinderella, Drizella, a resistance led by Tiana, and the Coven of the Eight led by Mother Gothel. Most flashbacks involved events that happened before the original curse and before the latest curse that brought everyone to Hyperion Heights, where unlike Storybrooke, its cursed inhabitants are living among ordinary people.

=== Expanded settings ===
The series, including its Wonderland spin-off, have explored beyond the main settings to numerous realms, each based on fairy tales, literature, and folklore. Known realms are Fairy Tale Land, the Land Without Magic, Wonderland, the Dreamscape, the Land Without Color, the Netherworld, Neverland, Victorian England, the Land of Oz, Kansas, Asgard, 1920s England, the Heroes & Villains alternate reality, the Underworld, the Worst Place, Mount Olympus, the Land of Untold Stories, 19th Century France, the World Behind the Mirror, the Dark Realm, the Wish Realm, New Fairy Tale Land, the Edge of Realms, New Wonderland, and the Prison Realm. In the series finale, all the realms are merged via a variation of the Dark Curse, being known as the United Realms.

== Cultural references ==
As a nod to the ties between the production teams of Once Upon a Time and Lost, the former show contains allusions to Lost. For example, many items found in Lost, such as Apollo candy bars, Oceanic Airlines, Ajira Airways, the TV series Exposé, and the MacCutcheon whiskey, can be seen in Once Upon a Time.

== Music ==
Mark Isham composed the series' theme and music; he was joined by Cindy O'Connor and Michael D. Simon for the seventh season. An extended play featuring four cues from the score was released on February 15, 2011, by ABC Studios. A full-length 25-track official soundtrack album was released on May 1, 2012, by Intrada Records to accompany season one. Another full-length 25-track official soundtrack album was released on August 13, 2013, by Intrada to accompany season two. Since December 2015, Mark Isham had begun to release music that was previously not released from the third, fourth, and fifth seasons on his SoundCloud account. An extended play featuring nine tracks from the score for the seventh season was released on August 17, 2018, by ABC Studios.

Season 1 Soundtrack
No.	Title	Length
1.	"Once Upon a Time Orchestral Suite"	4:13
2.	"Henry's Proposal"	1:17
3.	"The Queen's Curse"	2:46
4.	"Jiminy Cricket"	3:11
5.	"Dealing with Rumplestiltskin"	3:26
6.	"Belle's Story"	2:37
7.	"Dwarves"	2:45
8.	"The Huntsman"	4:31
9.	"Things Are Changing in Storybrooke"	1:47
10.	"Cinderella"	1:44
11.	"Wedding Dance"	1:21
12.	"Advising Ashley"	2:26
13.	"If the Shoe Fits"	1:35
14.	"Unhappy Endings"	3:46
15.	"Emma and Henry"	1:43
16.	"The Siren"	5:07
17.	"The Man with the Wooden Box"	1:11
18.	"Hope Will Return"	1:48
19.	"Rumplestiltskin in Love"	2:19
20.	"The Genie's Wishes"	1:58
21.	"The Road to True Love"	2:50
22.	"The Family Compass"	2:00
23.	"Burn the Witch"	2:34
24.	"What the Queen Loves Most"	2:30
25.	"The Clock Moves"	1:12
Total length:		62:30

Season 2 Soundtrack
No.	Title	Length
1.	"Sleeping Beauty"	2:29
2.	"True Love"	4:45
3.	"Magic"	3:12
4.	"We Are Both"	1:41
5.	"Meet the Jefferson"	2:37
6.	"Ruby and Granny"	1:54
7.	"A Real Boy"	2:26
8.	"The Hedge Maze"	4:13
9.	"Regina's True Love"	2:29
10.	"Storybrooke Reunions"	2:12
11.	"The Duelists"	1:21
12.	"The Lady Jack"	0:45
13.	"In a Burning Room"	4:16
14.	"Tallahassee"	2:21
15.	"This Boy Will Be Your Undoing"	2:46
16.	"Science!"	1:23
17.	"To Neverland!"	1:58
18.	"Cora's Waltz"	2:19
19.	"Snow White in Black"	2:45
20.	"How Magic Is Made"	3:33
21.	"One Perfect Day After Another"	2:37
22.	"Bae and the Shadow"	2:45
23.	"Tamara Shows Her True Colors"	4:20
24.	"The Adventure Begins"	2:14
25.	"Main Title"	0:14
Total length:		63:25

Season 7 Soundtrack
No.	Title	Length
1.	"The Fates of All Heroes"	2:52
2.	"Closest Thing to a Friend"	2:11
3.	"Rescue and Reunion"	2:22
4.	"The Boy Who Forgave"	3:40
5.	"Evolution, Wisdom and Love"	2:54
6.	"Reunited for Eternity"	1:28
7.	"The Good Curse"	2:05
8.	"The Good Queen"	3:42
9.	"Leaving Storybrooke"	3:33
Total length:		25:00

== Broadcast ==
The series has been licensed to over 190 countries. In Australia, Once Upon a Time first aired on Seven Network, starting on May 15, 2012. In Canada it aired on CTV from October 23, 2011. It premiered on Channel 5 in the United Kingdom on April 1, 2012. On December 17, 2013, it was confirmed that Channel 5 would not be picking the series up for the third season airing in the UK. On March 14, 2015, Netflix picked up the show in the United Kingdom and Ireland, subsequently showing all seasons and premiering each new episode on Wednesdays after their initial showing on Sundays on ABC. All seven seasons of the series were released on Disney+ in September 2020, and on Hulu in September 2023.

== Reception ==
=== Critical response ===
Critical response to the first season was generally positive. On Metacritic, it was given a score of 66 out of 100 with "generally favorable reviews".

Common Sense Media rated the show 4 out of 5 stars, highlighting its “multigenerational appeal” while cautioning parents against its occasional violence, innuendo, and mature language.

E!'s Kristin dos Santos cited the show as one of the five new shows of the 2011–2012 season to watch. Matthew Gilbert of The Boston Globe gave the show a "C+" grade commenting:

From a pair of Lost producers, this is a love-or-hate proposition. The ambition is impressive, as it asks us to imagine Goodwin's Snow White and Parrilla's Evil Queen as moderns. But Morrison is a wooden lead, and the back stories – a random collection of fairy tales -- don't promise to surprise."

In a review from the St. Louis Post-Dispatch, TV critic Gail Pennington hailed it as one of the "Most Promising Shows of The Fall" and, unlike Gilbert, had high marks for Morrison. USA Today's Robert Blanco placed the series on its top ten list, declaring that "There's nothing else on the air quite like it." Mary McNamara of the Los Angeles Times preferred the series to another fairy-tale themed drama, Grimm, citing that the premise takes its time building up the charm and that the producer "has that part nailed". She also gave excellent reviews for Morrison's character: "Her Emma is predictably cynical and prickly – fairy-tale princess, my Aunt Fanny – but she's sharp and lively enough to keep audiences begging for 'just a few more pages' before they go to bed."

Several feminist outlets were pleased with the show for its feminist twist on fairy tales. Avital Norman Nathman of Bitch stated that she liked the show for "infusing a feminist sensibility" into the stories. Genie Leslie at Feministing commented that Emma was a "badass", that she liked how Emma was "very adamant that women be able to make their own decisions about their lives and their children", and how Emma was a "well-rounded" character who was "feminine, but not 'girly'". Natalie Wilson from Ms. praised the show for a strong, "kick-butt" female lead, for including multiple strong women who take turns doing the saving with the men, for subverting the fetishization of true love, and for dealing with the idea of what makes a mother in a more nuanced fashion. Wilson went on to state of the lead: "Her pursuit of a 'happy ending' is not about finding a man or going to a ball all gussied up, but about detective work, about building a relationship with her son Henry, and about seeking the 'truth' as to why time stands still in the corrupt Storybrooke world."

=== Ratings ===
The first season premiered as the top-rated drama series. The pilot episode was watched by 13 million viewers and received a 4.0 rating/share among 18- to 49-year-olds. It was the season's highest-rated drama debut among the age range and ABC's biggest debut in five years. With DVR viewers, the premiere climbed to 15.5 million viewers and a 5.2 rating/share in adults 18–49. The show's next three episodes had consistent ratings every week with over 11 million viewers. The series became the number one non-sports program in the U.S. with viewers and young adults on Sunday nights.

Viewership and ratings per season of Once Upon a Time
Season	Timeslot (ET)	Episodes	First aired		Last aired		TV season	Viewership rank	Avg. viewers (millions)	18–49 rank	Avg. 18–49 rating
Season	Timeslot (ET)	Episodes	Date	Viewers (millions)	Date	Viewers (millions)	TV season	Viewership rank	Avg. viewers (millions)	18–49 rank	Avg. 18–49 rating
1	Sunday 8:00 pm	22	October 23, 2011	12.93	May 13, 2012	9.66	2011–12	28	11.71	18	4.1/10
2	Sunday 8:00 pm	22	September 30, 2012	11.36	May 12, 2013	7.33	2012–13	35	10.24	18	3.6/9
3	Sunday 8:00 pm	22	September 29, 2013	8.52	May 11, 2014	6.80	2013–14	35	9.38	12	3.3/8
4	Sunday 8:00 pm	23	September 28, 2014	9.47	May 10, 2015	5.51	2014–15	50	8.98	17	3.2/7
5	Sunday 8:00 pm	23	September 27, 2015	5.93	May 15, 2016	4.07	2015–16	69	6.32	34	2.2
6	Sunday 8:00 pm	22	September 25, 2016	3.99	May 14, 2017	2.95	2016–17	105	4.39	70	1.5/5
7	Friday 8:00 pm	22	October 6, 2017	3.26	May 18, 2018	2.27	2017–18	120	3.41	115	0.9

=== Awards and nominations ===
Once Upon a Time was nominated for a 2012 People's Choice Award for "Favorite New TV Drama". The show was nominated at the 39th People's Choice Awards in four categories: Favorite Network TV Drama, Favorite Sci-Fi/Fantasy Show, Favorite TV Fan Following, and Favorite TV Drama Actress (Ginnifer Goodwin), and the show was nominated in the Network TV Drama category 40th People's Choice Awards.

The show was also nominated for "Best Genre Series" at the 2011 Satellite Awards. The show was nominated in this category again at the 2012 Satellite Awards. The program also received two nominations at the 2012 Visual Effects Society Awards.

At the 38th Saturn Awards, the series received a nomination for Best Network Television Series and Parrilla was nominated for Best Supporting Actress on Television. It was also nominated for Best Network Television Series at the 39th Saturn Awards.

Jared S. Gilmore was nominated for Best Performance by a Younger Actor on Television at 40th Saturn Awards.

The show received trophies for "Favorite New TV Drama" and "Favorite Villain" for Lana Parrilla by the TV Guide.

The show was nominated thrice as best series from 2012–14 by the Teen Choice Awards.

It was also nominated at the 64th Creative Arts Primetime Emmy Awards and again at 65th Primetime Creative Arts Emmy Awards.

The show won three Choice Awards at the Teen Choice Awards 2016.

== Tie-in material ==
=== Novels ===
In 2013, Disney-owned Hyperion Books published Reawakened by Odette Beane, a novelization of storylines from the first season, expanded to include new perspectives. The narrative is from the points-of-view of Emma Swan in Storybrooke and Snow White in the Enchanted Forest. The novel was published on April 28, 2013, as an ebook and May 7, 2013, in paperback form.

In 2015, production company Kingswell Teen published Red's Untold Tale, by Wendy Toliver, a novel telling a story of Red's past that was not seen in the show. The novel was published on September 22, 2015, and consisted of 416 pages.

In 2017, Kingswell Teen published a second novel, Regina Rising, also written by Wendy Toliver, which depicts the life of a sixteen-year-old Regina. The novel was published on April 25, 2017.

In 2018, Kingswell Teen published a third novel, Henry and Violet, written by Michelle Zink, which follows Henry and Violet on an adventure to New York City. The novel was published on May 8, 2018.

=== Comic books ===
A comic book, titled Once Upon a Time: Shadow of the Queen, was released on September 4, 2013, in both digital and hardcover forms. The story was written by Dan Thomsen and Corinna Bechko, with art by Nimit Malavia, Vasilis Lolos, Mike del Mundo, Stephanie Hans and Mike Henderson. Shadow of the Queen details what happens after the Evil Queen takes the Huntsman's heart. She forces the Huntsman to commit evil and try to capture Snow White yet again. The Huntsman faces his past, and also meets Red Riding Hood, who is trying to cope with her beastly alter ego. Together, they team up and try to save Snow White before all is too late.

On April 14, 2014, a sequel to the first comic book called Once Upon a Time: Out of the Past was released, which details previously unseen flashback stories of Captain Hook, the Evil Queen, Rumplestiltskin, Belle and the Mad Hatter from before the original curse.

== Spin-off ==
In February 2013, Kitsis and Horowitz, along with producers Zack Estrin and Jane Espenson, began developing a spin-off series focusing on Lewis Carroll's Wonderland, titled Once Upon a Time in Wonderland. A "teaser presentation" began filming in April 2013, and the pilot was shot in late July or August. On May 10, 2013, ABC announced that it had greenlit the spin-off, and announced on May 14, 2013, that it would air in the Thursday night 8:00pm time slot instead of filling in for the parent series. The series premiered on October 10, 2013, and ended on April 3, 2014, after a single-season 13-episode run.

== Future ==
In June 2023, Carlyle admitted in an interview with The A.V. Club that the series "ran for too long", adding that the first four seasons were "as good as anything [he had] been involved in." In February 2024, O'Donoghue spoke with Collider about the possibility of a revival, stating that he had "spoken to [Kitsis and Horowitz] and a few other people about it". In August 2024, Goodwin said she had heard rumors of a reboot and was interested in returning to the series. In February 2025, Morrison stated that she believed the series "deserved" a reboot, but with a different cast and different characters. In August 2025, Parrilla expressed her interest in returning though she preferred a continuation film over a new series.
