= Yvonne Gilbert =

British artist and book illustrator (born 1950s)

- Born: 1950 or 1951 (age 75–76); Wallsend, Northumberland, England
- Other name: Yvonne Gilbert
- Occupations: Artist and illustrator
- Website: www.anneyvonnegilbert.com

Anne Yvonne Gilbert (born 1950 or 1951) is a British artist and book illustrator. Her cover design of Frankie Goes To Hollywood's 1983 single "Relax" has been described as "one of the most famous record sleeves of all time". While much of her career since then has focused on illustrating the covers and interiors of popular books, Gilbert has also designed series of stamps produced by the Royal Mail depicting Christmas themes and Arthurian mythology. She illustrated several of the books in the Ologies series, among other children's books.

== Career ==
Gilbert was born in Wallsend and lived in her grandparents' house with her parents. She attended Holy Cross School there, as well as Ocean Road School in South Shields, eventually finishing at Morpeth Grammar School for Girls. Her grandmother was an artist, and Gilbert's parents encouraged her talent for art: "I've always drawn since a baby. The seed was planted early when my mother brought me books back from jumble sales." Gilbert spent a brief amount of time at an art college in Liverpool studying graphic design, before "stumbling" upon her career as a professional artist. She explained, "I managed to get an agent who got me a job for the Sunday Telegraph drawing six famous people as the historical characters they most wanted to be. Then I cut my teeth on women's magazines."

She lived for a time with Holly Johnson and Paul Rutherford (both later members of Frankie Goes To Hollywood). They asked her to create a piece of art for them, but not having enough time, Gilbert gave them an existing "fetish-themed" piece she had drawn for Playboy and Men Only. The cover was featured on their 1983 single "Relax" and quickly attracted comment, though she claimed not to have made any money from it. According to the Evening Chronicle, her design became "one of the most famous record sleeves of all time" and led to Gilbert becoming the recipient of "global attention."

In 1985, the Royal Mail issued four stamps that were designed by Gilbert. They featured scenes from Arthurian mythology, and were meant to celebrate the quincentenary of the publication of Thomas Malory's Le Morte d'Arthur. Gilbert has also created special sets of Christmas stamps for the Royal Mail. According to Gilbert in a 2005 interview, the company had paid her at least £100,000 in the past to design five sets of special stamps. Her 1994 series depicted young children dressed up as various Nativity characters including the Three Wise Men and the Virgin Mary. One of her collections, "The Nativity at Christmas", won the award for the world's most beautiful stamp in 1984.

=== Book illustrations ===
In the 1970s, Gilbert provided front-cover illustrations for the Penguin Books edition of the works of D. H. Lawrence. In 2004, The Journal reported that Gilbert "has progressed to become one of the best selling British illustrators in the USA, well known for the fairytale quality of her work seen mostly in children's books." Gilbert compiled 16 traditional lullabies into her 1991 book, Baby's Book of Lullabies & Cradle Songs, which she illustrated using watercolours. The selections included songs in English, French, and Norwegian, among other languages. She illustrated Rebecca Hickox's children's book, Per and the Dala Horse in 1997, and M.C. Helldorfer's Night of the White Stag in 1999. Gilbert has provided artwork for many other children's books, including A Visit from St. Nicholas, and Vivien French's A Christmas Star Called Hannah, both published in 2000. She illustrated Billy Joel's first children's book, "Goodbye My Angel", in 2004, which he based on a song he wrote for his daughter. Publishers Weekly opined that Gilbert's "idealized images of the long-lashed heroine and luminous landscapes echo the unabashedly sentimental strains of Joel's song."

Gilbert and several other artists illustrated some of the popular Ologies series: Wizardology: The Book of the Secrets of Merlin (2005), Pirateology: A Pirate Hunter's Companion (2006), and Spyology: The Complete Book of Spycraft (2008). Gilbert's initial colour-pencilled drawings for Wizardology, featuring "Merlin in his book-filled study, and a young magician in training," were lost by the Royal Mail in 2005 when she tried to mail them to publisher Templar. The Mail tried to compensate her just for the price of the paper and ink, to her anger, as she believed the works were "worth about pounds 2,500. Not to mention its future value if the book is a success." The incident led her to demand the company solidify its policy on determining the value of works of art.

She has also provided the illustrations for the Brothers Grimm work The Frog Prince, retold by Kathy-Jo Wargin in 2007. The Columbia Daily Tribune called her contributions "breathtaking," and the Cape Cod Times praised her artwork, declaring in a review that "the absolute beauty of this book is in the illustrations by Anne Yvonne Gilbert. Highly detailed and in softly lush colors, Gilbert’s color-pencil drawings are almost worthy of framing, and their detail will appeal to the littlest princess as well as fairy tale lovers ages 3 and up."

Gilbert has provided the cover art for many of Jennifer Roberson's novels, including Lady of the Forest (1992) and its sequel Lady of Sherwood (1999), Lady of the Glen (1996), Highwaymen: Robbers and Rogues (1997), and the 2001 republications of her Chronicles of the Cheysuli fantasy series: Shapechanger's Song, Legacy of the Wolf, Children of the Lion, and The Lion Throne. Gilbert designed the art in The Wild Swans in 2005, featured in a republication of Hans Christian Andersen's story. In 2006, she redesigned the cover of George RR Martin's 1980 novel The Ice Dragon. Martin called the edition "lavishly illustrated," and noted her reputation for being an "acclaimed British fantasy artist". In 2010, she provided the illustrations seen in an abridged, young adult version of Bram Stoker's Dracula, as told by author Nicky Raven. Gilbert produced the "traditional fairy tale type" illustrations for Jodi Picoult's first young adult novel Between the Lines, published in 2012.

== Style ==
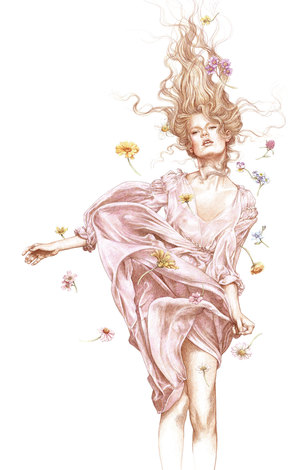
"Fashion Drawing", one of Gilbert's works drawn by coloured pencils

Gilbert's art has been called "fantastically elaborate". She draws many of her works with coloured pencils, despite calling them "such an unreliable medium," in part because she dislikes the mess associated with using paint, ink, or clay.

According to Gilbert, her process "probably takes as long to prepare an illustration—sketching roughs, e-mailing them to clients, finding models, props and reference, taking the pictures—as it does to do the finished piece, and it takes me roughly one week to complete a moderately detailed illustration." She often asks family members and friends to be photographed in certain clothing to aid her in conceptualizing a piece of art. She prefers drawing people to inanimate objects, explaining that if she hadn't become "an illustrator, I'd be a forensic psychologist because people and how they work intrigue me." Gilbert remarked of her career that in addition to children's books, she has "also gone to the other end of the scale and produced illustrations for Playboy. I go from drawing people in rubber outfits and corsets to pretty fairies!"

== Personal life ==
In 2006, Gilbert sold her house near Castle Leazes in Newcastle upon Tyne to move to Toronto with her son and second husband. That same year, she displayed a large portion of her collection at the Newcastle Arts Centre.

She has taught dress design at the Birmingham College of Art, and rescues Bull Terriers in her free time.

== Selected book cover illustrations ==
Adapted from:

- Annerton Pit by Peter Dickinson (1977)
- Little, Big by John Crowley (1983)
- The Compass Rose by Ursula K. Le Guin (1983)
- Beasts by John Crowley (1983)
- Engine Summer by John Crowley (1983)
- The Deep by John Crowley (1984)
- A Wizard of Earthsea by Ursula K. Le Guin (1984)
- The Tombs of Atuan by Ursula K. Le Guin (1984)
- The Farthest Shore by Ursula K. Le Guin (1984)
- The Bronze King by Suzy McKee Charnas (1988)
- The Silver Glove by Suzy McKee Charnas (1988)
- Moon Mirror by Andre Norton (1988)
- A Heroine of the World by Tanith Lee (1989)
- The Golden Thread by Suzy McKee Charnas (1989)
- The Hammer of the Sun by Michael Scott Rohan (1989)
- The Anvil of Ice by Michael Scott Rohan (1989)
- The Forge in the Forest by Michael Scott Rohan (1989)
- The Moonbane Mage by Laurie J. Marks (1990)
- Ara's Field by Laurie J. Marks (1991)
- In a Blue Velvet Dress by Catherine Sefton (1991)
- The Back House Ghosts by Catherine Sefton (1991)
- Linnets and Valerians by Elizabeth Goudge (1992)
- The Little White Horse by Elizabeth Goudge (1992)
- Lady of the Forest by Jennifer Roberson (1992)
- A Shadow on the Skin by Keren Gilfoyle (1993)
- Lady of the Glen by Jennifer Roberson (1996)
- Kingmaker's Sword by Ann Marston (1996)
- The Western King by Ann Marston (1996)
- The Changeling by Kristine Kathryn Rusch (1996)
- Broken Blade by Ann Marston (1997)
- The Rival by Kristine Kathryn Rusch (1997)
- Highwaymen: Robbers and Rogues ed. by Jennifer Roberson (1997)
- Shadows over Lyra by Patricia C. Wrede (1997)
- The Paradise War by Stephen R. Lawhead (1998)
- The Endless Knot by Stephen R. Lawhead (1998)
- The Silver Hand by Stephen R. Lawhead (1998)
- The Resistance by Kristine Kathryn Rusch (1998)
- Victory by Kristine Kathryn Rusch (1998)
- Cloudbearer's Shadow by Ann Marston (1999)
- King of Shadows by Ann Marston (1999)
- The Winter Queen by Cary Osborne (1999)
- Wizard of the Grove by Tanya Huff (1999)
- Twice Upon a Time by Denise Little (1999)
- Lady of Sherwood by Jennifer Roberson (1999)
- The Renegade Dragon by Irene Radford (1999)
- A Dance for Emilia by Peter S. Beagle (2000)
- New Amazons by Margaret Weis (2000)
- Sword and Shadow by Ann Marston (2000)
- The Young Wizards by Diane Duane (2001)
- Shapechanger's Song by Jennifer Roberson (2001)
- Legacy of the Wolf by Jennifer Roberson (2001)
- Children of the Lion by Jennifer Roberson (2001)
- The Lion Throne by Jennifer Roberson (2001)
- The Meeting of the Waters by Caiseal Mór (2002)
- Wizard's Castle by Diana Wynne Jones (2002)
- The King of Sleep by Caiseal Mór (2002)
- Heartlight by T. A. Barron (2003)
- The Dalemark Quartet by Diana Wynne Jones (2003)
- The Raven Game by Caiseal Mór (2003)
- Moonspeaker by K. D. Wentworth (2004)
- The Ancient One by T. A. Barron (2004)
- House of Moons by K. D. Wentworth (2004)
- The Ice Dragon by George R. R. Martin (2006)
- The Adventures of Snider, the CIA Spider by John Taylor Gatto (2017)

== Bibliography ==
- Abbey Lubbers, Banshees, & Boggarts: An Illustrated Encyclopedia of Fairies (1979)
- Relax (1983)
- The Enchanted World: Legends of Valor (1984)
- The Enchanted World: Night Creatures (1985)
- The Enchanted World: Spells and Bindings (1985)
- Wizardology: The Book of the Secrets of Merlin (2005)
- Pirateology: A Pirate Hunter's Companion (2006)
- Spyology: The Complete Book of Spycraft (2008)
- Vampireology: The True History of the Fallen Ones (2010)
- Jesus is Born (2016)
