= Dugald Steer =

English children's writer

- Born: 1965 (age 60–61); England, United Kingdom
- Education: University of Bristol (BA)
- Occupations: Writer, author, teacher
- Writing career
- Genre: Children's fantasy literature
- Notable works: Dragonology; Wizardology; Pirateology

Dugald A. Steer (born 1965) is an English children's writer. He wrote books in the book series Ology.

== Biography ==
=== Early life and education ===
Dugald Steer was born in 1965 and grew up in Surrey. He completed a Bachelor of Arts, majoring in English literature and philosophy at University of Bristol, then completed a TEFL course and lived in Spain for five years.

=== Career ===
After returning to the United Kingdom, Steer got a job with Templar Publishing, working his way up to become senior editor. At Templar, he wrote and edited many books, including numerous Ologies. He has since gone freelance in order to pursue writing for children and teaching.

== Published works ==
Steer has authored over 100 books, beginning with Big Bear and the Missing Mouse (1995). Other notable works of his include Mythical Mazes, Scary Fairies, An Accidental Christmas, Just One More Story, The Night Tiger, Dragonology, The Dragonology Chronicles: The Dragon's Eye, The Dragonology Chronicles: The Dragon Diary, The Dragonology Chronicles: The Dragon's Apprentice, and The Dragonology Chronicles: The Dragon Prophecy.

== Bibliography ==
- Time for School (1997)
- Scary Fairies (1997)
- Midnight Bear (2002)
- Time for a Tale (2002)
- Dragonology: The Complete Book of Dragons (2003) (illustrated by Helen Ward, Wayne Anderson, Nghiem Ta, Chris Forsey, A. J. Wood, and Douglas Carrel)
- Egyptology: Search for the Tomb of Osiris (2004) (illustrated by Nghiem Ta, Ian P. Andrew, Nick Harris, and Helen Ward)
- Wizardology: The Book of the Secrets of Merlin (2005) (illustrated by Nghiem Ta, Anne Yvonne Gilbert, John Howe, Tomislav Tomic, and Helen Ward)
- Little Mouse, I Love You (2005)
- Snappy Little Christmas (2006)
- How to be a Knight: A Squire's Guide by Sir Geoffrey de Lance (2006)
- Pirateology: A Pirate Hunter's Companion (2006) (illustrated by Nghiem Ta, Ian Andrew, Anne Yvonne Gilbert, Helen Ward, G. Hunt, R. Sella, and Carole Thomann)
- Mythology: Greek Gods, Heroes, & Monsters (2007)
- Monsterology: The Complete Book of Fabulous Beasts (2008)
- The Monsterology Handbook: A Practical Course in Monsters (2008)
- Spyology: The Complete Book of Spycraft (2008)
- Drake's Comprehensive Compendium of Dragonology (2009) (illustrated by Nghiem Ta, J. P. Lambert, A. J. Wood, Douglas Carrel, Tomislav Tomic, Nick Harris, Wayne Anderson, and Helen Ward)
- Oceanology: The True Account of the Voyage of the Nautilus (2009)
- Vampireology: The True History of the Fallen (2010)
- Alienology: The Complete Book of Extraterrestrials (2010)
- Illusionology: The Secret Science of Magic (2012)
- Dinosaurology: The Search for a Lost World (2013)
- Dungeonology (2016)
- Knightology: A True Account of the Most Valiant Knights (2017)
- Ghostology: A True Revelation of Spirits, Ghouls, and Hauntings (2020)
