= Pirateology: A Pirate Hunter's Companion =

2006 book by Dugald Steer

- Pirateology first edition cover
- Author: Dugald Steer
- Illustrator: Nghiem Ta, Ian Andrew, Anne Yvonne Gilbert, Helen Ward, G. Hunt, R. Sella, and Carole Thomann
- Language: English
- Series: Ologies
- Subject: Pirates
- Genre: Fantasy
- Publisher: Templar Publishing (UK); Candlewick Press (US)
- Publication date: July 11, 2006
- Publication place: United Kingdom
- Media type: Print (hardback)
- Pages: 32 pp (first edition)
- ISBN: 978-0-7636-3143-7
- OCLC: 70245051
- Dewey Decimal: 910.4/5 22
- LC Class: G535 .S755 2006
- Preceded by: Wizardology: The Book of the Secrets of Merlin
- Followed by: Mythology: Greek Gods, Heroes, & Monsters

Pirateology: A Pirate Hunter's Companion is the fourth book in the Ologies series, created and published by Templar Publishing in the UK, and published by Candlewick Press in North America in 2006.

This book is composed of what remains of that left behind by the fictional privateer Captain William Lubber. His journal tells of the chase of the notorious female pirate Arabella Drummond across the seven seas. Included in the book is a replica of a treasure map, leading to Arabella Drummond's buried treasure.

The author is Dugald Steer, while the book was designed by Nghiem Ta, and features the artwork of Ian Andrew, Anne Yvonne Gilbert, Helen Ward, G. Hunt, R. Sella and Carole Thomann.

== Daily accounts in journal ==
- September 13, 1723: Boston, Massachusetts
- October 2, 1723: Ocracoke Inlet, North Carolina
- October 25, 1723: Off Tortuga
- November 5, 1723: Port Royal, Jamaica
- March 20, 1724: Juan Fernández Islands
- June 27, 1724: Isla del Coco, near Panama
- December 17, 1724: Off Canton, China
- January 8, 1725: Krakatoa, Sunda Strait
- May 22, 1725: Madagascar
- March 5, 1726: Malta
- May 31, 1726: Oak Island, Nova Scotia
- June 1, 1726: Grand Banks, Newfoundland

== Awards and honors ==
- 2007: Children's Illustrated Honor Book, Indies Choice Book Awards

== In other media ==
=== Video games ===
In 2007, Codemasters acquired the rights to create video games for the Wii and Nintendo DS based on Pirateology, as well as Dragonology and Wizardology. Nik Nak was to develop the Wii titles. Only Dragonology game was produced for Nintendo DS, while other games based on the books were cancelled.

=== Planned film adaptations ===
In 2018, Paramount Pictures acquired the rights to develop a film franchise based on all Ologies books, including a Pirateology portion of the series. Akiva Goldsman was hired to oversee a writers' room to write scripts for interconnected family films based on the books and supplemental materials, partnering with Weed Road studio colleague Greg Lessans as the film's producers.
