= Ology (book series) =

Fantasy book series

Ologies
- Dragonology; Egyptology; Wizardology; Pirateology; Mythology; Monsterology; Spyology; Oceanology; Vampireology; Alienology; Illusionology; Dinosaurology; Dungeonology; Knightology; Ghostology
- Author: Dugald Steer and others
- Illustrator: Wayne Anderson, Douglas Carrel and Helen Ward
- Country: England
- Language: English
- Genre: Fantasy; Human history Natural history
- Publisher: Templar Publishing (UK); Candlewick Press (US); Five Mile Press (AUS)
- Published: 2003–2020
- Media type: Hardcover

The Ologies are a series of illustrated, interactive, Montessori-style books presented in an encyclopedic format. The inspirations for the topics range from fantasy and the unknown (myths and legends, creatures and monsters, paranormal and aliens) to non-fictional human and natural history. The series is primarily authored and edited by Dugald A. Steer. The various "authors" of the books are pseudonyms representing fictional characters who are experts in the subject matter, but some of the pseudonyms used, such as Dr. Ernest Drake from the Dragonology portion of the series, may have been based on real people. The books are published by Templar Publishing in the United Kingdom, Five Mile Press in Australia, Rizzoli Libri in Italy, Candlewick Press in the United States, and Penguin Random House in Canada. The first book, Dragonology: The Complete Book of Dragons, remained on the New York Times' children's bestsellers list for 76 weeks, and spawned a spin-off novel series, The Dragonology Chronicles.

The books, which are intended for young readers, have spawned additional Ology World merchandise including action figures, plush toys, board games and card games, and a video game.

== Format ==
Each of the books is given a fictional "author", and purport to be the writings and lost journals of fictional investigators and experts. Since the books follow an encyclopedia format rather than a narrative, Steer has said that "it's slightly different from traditional reading. Readers can dip in and out, but the essential story is told in a linear way".

The large-format books contain many novelty items of ephemera including removable maps and postcards, letters that can be unfolded, and tactile items such as "dragon scales", "mummy cloth" and "gold doubloons".

The books are illustrated by a variety of artists, including Helen Ward, Wayne Anderson, Nghiem Ta, Chris Forsey, A. J. Wood, Douglas Carrel, J.P. Lambert, Ian P. Andrew, Nick Harris, Anne Yvonne Gilbert, John Howe, Tomislav Tomic, G. Hunt, R. Sella, and Carole Thomann.

== Books ==
- Dragonology: The Complete Book of Dragons (2003)
  - The Dragonology Handbook: A Practical Course in Dragons
  - A Dragonology Code Writing Kit
  - Dragonology The Coloring Book
  - Dragonology The Coloring Companion
  - Working with Dragons: A Course in Dragonology
  - Drake's Comprehensive Compendium of Dragonology
  - Tracking and Taming Dragons Volume 1: European Dragon
  - Tracking and Taming Dragons Volume 2: Frost Dragon
  - Dragonology Field Guide to Dragons
  - Bringing Up Baby Dragons: A Guide for Beginners
  - Obscure Spells and Charms of Dragon Origin: A Dragonology Kit
  - Dragonology Pocket Adventures:
    1. The Iceland Wyrm
    2. The Dragon Star
    3. The Dragon Dance
    4. The Winged Serpent
  - Dragonology Chronicles:
    1. The Dragon’s Eye
    2. The Dragon Diary
    3. The Dragon’s Apprentice
    4. The Dragon Prophecy
- Egyptology: Search for the Tomb of Osiris (2004)
  - The Egyptology Handbook: A Course in the Wonders of Egypt
  - An Egyptologist's Writing Kit
  - Wonders of Egypt: A Course in Egyptology
  - Egyptology the Coloring Book
- Wizardology: The Book of the Secrets of Merlin (2005)
  - The Wizardology Handbook: A Course for Apprentices
  - A Wizard's Code Writing Kit
  - A Guide to Wizards of the World
- Pirateology: A Pirate Hunter's Companion (2006)
  - The Pirateology Handbook: A Course in Pirate Hunting
  - A Pirateology Code Writing Kit
  - Pirateology Handbook: A Course for Seafarers
  - Pirateology Handbook: A Cabin Boy's Course in Pirate Hunting
  - A Pirate's Guidebook and Model Ship Set
  - Pirateology Guide to Life on Board a Pirate Ship
- Mythology: Greek Gods, Heroes, & Monsters (2007)
  - The Mythology Handbook
- Monsterology: The Complete Book of Fabulous Beasts (2008)
  - The Monsterology Handbook: A Practical Course in Monsters
  - Working with Monsters: A Course in Monsterology
- Spyology: The Complete Book of Spycraft (2008)
- Oceanology: The True Account of the Voyage of the Nautilus (2009)
  - The Oceanology Handbook: A Course for Underwater Explorers
- Vampireology: The True History of the Fallen (2010)
- Alienology: The Complete Book of Extraterrestrials (2010)
- Illusionology: The Secret Science of Magic (2012)
- Dinosaurology: The Search for a Lost World (2013)
- Dungeonology - made in collaboration with Dungeons & Dragons (2016)
- Knightology: A True Account of the Most Valiant Knights (2017)
- Ghostology: A True Revelation of Spirits, Ghouls, and Hauntings (2020)
- Dr. Ernest Drake's Collector's Library (contains two books: Dragonology and Monsterology)
- The Ology Collection (contains four books: Dragonology, Egyptology, Wizardology and Pirateology)

For some books, there were minor differences in titles and cover designs between the British, Australian, Italian and North American publishers.

== Games ==
=== Board games ===
- Dragonology: The Game
- Wizardology: The Game
- Pirateology: The Game
- Mythology: The Game
- Vampireology: The Fallen Ones

=== Card games ===
- Hatch: The Dragonology Card Game
- Spells and Potions: The Wizardology Card Game
- Splice: The Pirateology Card Game
- Monsterology: Unleash the Monsters trading card game

=== Video games ===
In 2007, Codemasters acquired the rights to create video games for the Wii and Nintendo DS based on Dragonology, Wizardology and Pirateology. Nik Nak was to develop the Wii titles. Dragonology for the Nintendo DS was released in November 2009, while other Ologies video games were cancelled and never produced.

== Toys ==
=== Figures and mini-figures ===
- Dragonology figures (dragons)
- Wizardology figures (wizards)
- Pirateology mini-figures (pirates and ships)
- Mythology figures and mini-figures (mythological characters and monsters)

=== Plush Toys ===
- Dragonology (dragons)
- Mythology (pegasus)

=== Wooden construction sets ===
- Dragonology (dragons)
- Pirateology (ships)

=== Jigsaw puzzles (100 piece) ===
- Dragonology: Dragons of the World
- Egyptology: The Wonders of Egypt
- Wizardology

== Planned film adaptations ==
In 2008, Universal Pictures acquired the film rights to the Dragonology series and Leonard Hartman was set to write and executive produce the adaptation. Alex Kurtzman and Roberto Orci were attached to produce the film for Universal.

In 2012, Carlos Saldanha, the director of the Ice Age and Rio films, was attached to develop for 20th Century Fox and Blue Sky Studios an animated feature film based on Alienology: The Complete Book of Extraterrestrials.

In 2018, Paramount Pictures acquired the rights to develop a film franchise based on all Ologies books. The writers' room was set up, consisting of Jeff Pinkner, Michael Chabon, Lindsey Beer, Joe Robert Cole, Nicole Perlman and Christina Hodson. The vision for the franchise was for each of the writers to take on the books, collaborating with visual artists to create treatments that would eventually develop into seven scenarios with interconnected storylines. Akiva Goldsman was hired to act as overseer and producer of the franchise.
