= Moon mirror =

Moon mirror may refer to:

- List of retroreflectors on the Moon, a collection of reflective devices placed on the surface of the Moon by the Apollo and Lunokhod missions.
- Moon Mirror a collection of fantasy and science fiction short stories by Andre Norton.
- Moon Mirror (album), a 2024 album by Nada Surf

== See also ==
- The Moon in the Mirror, a 1990 Chilean film
- MirrorMoon EP, a video game
