= Ice Queen =

Ice Queen may refer to:

- Ice Queen (film), a 2005 American horror film
- "Ice Queen" (JAG), an episode of JAG and the first part of the backdoor pilot of NCIS
- "Ice Queen" (song), a song by Within Temptation
- The Ice Queen, a 2005 novel by Alice Hoffman
- The Ice Queen, a 2018 album by Sue Foley
- Cleo Ice Queen (born 1989), Zambian hip hop recording artist
- Ice Queen, the gender-swapped version of Ice King in the Adventure Time episode "Fionna and Cake"
- "Ice Queen", a song by Ive from Ive Switch

== See also ==
- Ice King (disambiguation)
- Snow Queen (disambiguation)
