= Lady of Sherwood =

Book by Jennifer Roberson

- First edition cover
- Author: Jennifer Roberson
- Illustrator: Anne Yvonne Gilbert
- Cover artist: Anne Yvonne Gilbert
- Language: English
- Genre: Historical fiction
- Publisher: Kensington Books
- Publication date: 1999
- Publication place: United States
- Media type: Print
- Pages: 372
- ISBN: 1575664755
- OCLC: 42590847
- Preceded by: Lady of the Forest

Lady of Sherwood is a 1999 historical fiction novel by American author Jennifer Roberson. It is a sequel to her 1992 novel Lady of the Forest, and follows Robin Hood, Lady Marian, and their associates, as they fight injustices in the wake of the death of King Richard. They must fight the machinations of Prince John, who is competing for the throne against his young nephew, Arthur of Brittany.

The novel was published in November 1999 by Kensington Books with cover art illustrated by Anne Yvonne Gilbert. It has garnered a generally positive reception. Booklist positively compared Lady of Sherwood to the Marion Zimmer Bradley work The Mists of Avalon, while others praised Roberson's engaging characters and attention to historical detail.

== Plot summary ==
The novel is set in 1199 England, and follows the events of Lady of the Forest. It begins with the death of Richard I of England. Robin of Locksley, his lover Lady Marian Fitzwalter, and their outlaw friends find themselves again facing the wrath of William DeLacey, the Sheriff of Nottingham. Richard's death has resulted in the loss of their royal pardon, which was granted after they seized the tax revenues that were to be sent to Richard's brother Prince John. With Richard's death, John is now competing for the crown against his young nephew, Arthur of Brittany. With Richard having named them both co-heirs, both men have their supporters, with the Sheriff supporting the former and Robin's father the Earl of Huntington supporting the latter.

Meanwhile, Robin and Marian, along with their outlaw friends, are living together at her manor of Ravenskeep, though Robin and Marian have not married. To her great sadness, Marian has discovered that she cannot have children, but hides her miscarriages from Robin to avoid worrying him. She tells Robin's estranged father the Earl of Huntington about her perceived barrenness, wishing for him to force Robin to leave her, as she wants him to have the chance to father an heir with someone else.

With the pardon now over, the Sheriff begins anew his efforts to arrest Sherwood's outlaws. Knowing that it has housed some of these men, he ransacks Ravenskeep and attempts to have it legally taken away from her. Marian declares war on the Sheriff. Later, she and Robin, accompanied by their outlaw friends, retreat to the woods for a permanent outlaw camp, having officially lost everything legitimate. Robin and Marian finally marry.

== Development ==
Lady of Sherwood was written by American author Jennifer Roberson as a sequel to her popular 1992 novel Lady of the Forest. Before writing both novels, Roberson was primarily known as a fantasy writer, and became interested in writing a "big, sprawling, mainstream historical epic." To her agent, she proposed a reinterpretation that would "emphasize Marian's point of view and contribution to the legend" of Robin Hood. Roberson wrote her interpretations as prequels to the known legend.

While the first novel focused on "how seven very different people from a rigidly stratified social structure came to join together to fight the inequities of medieval England," her sequel Lady of Sherwood centered on the political instability surrounding Richard's death. She chose this particular period of history because the "death of a popular monarch always provide fodder for novelists." Admitting that she "employ[ed] the storyteller’s license" in her writing of the novel, Roberson "significantly compressed and rearranged the events following King Richard's death." The main characters became outlaws in her first novel, and she "chose to depict [their] resultant activities in the sequel as an outgrowth of the very real political conflict between John and Arthur."

For research, Roberson used many of the same sources that she employed for Lady of the Forest, including J. C. Holt's Robin Hood, Maurice Keen's The Outlaws of Sherwood, Jim Lees' The Ballads of Robin Hood, Elizabeth Hallam's The Plantagenet Chronicles, and Robert Hardy's Longbow: A Social and Military History, as well as W. L. Warren's King John and the work Swords and Hilt Weapons.

== Release and reception ==
"Particularly strong is her construction of Marian, portrayed as thoroughly independent but not burdened with anachronistic feminist ways. Her incorporation of historical detail, including the handling of bows and swords, is assured and lends an unobtrusive richness to the tale, while Marian and Robin's tumultuous love should keep romance fans turning pages. Exciting and satisfying, Roberson's genre-blending novel may be her best yet."

— Publishers Weekly on the novel

Lady of Sherwood was published by Kensington Books in November 1999, with cover art by illustrator Anne Yvonne Gilbert. A German translation, written by Susanne Gerold, was released in 2002. A 2007 Kensington republication of the novel featured cover art by Gregg Gulbronson, who also redesigned the covers for Roberson's works Lady of the Forest and Lady of the Glen.

The novel has received generally positive reviews. Contributing to the Library Journal, Jackie Cassada asserted that "fans of historical fiction and period fantasy should enjoy this rousing story," while Booklist's Kaite Mediatore Stover opined that it "is just the story for the handywoman who can take care of herself." Writing for the same publication, Melanie Duncan positively compared Lady of Sherwood to the novel The Mists of Avalon, writing "what Marion Zimmer Bradley did for King Arthur, Roberson is doing for Robin Hood and Marian."

Publishers Weekly praised Roberson's ability to "cleverly interweave" Robin Hood's fictional clash with the sheriff in the wake of Richard's death with "the historical problems that surrounded the election of Richard's successor." Giving particular praise to the novel's characterization of Marian, the media outlet stated that "Roberson's tightly written plot paves the way for events that might have come off as coincidences or accidents in less skillful hands, and her characters are engaging." In 2013, romance author Eliza Knight included it on a list of recommended medieval historicals.

== See also ==
- List of historical novels
- Robin Hood in popular culture
