= Wizardology: The Book of the Secrets of Merlin =

2005 book by Dugald Steer

- First edition cover
- Author: Dugald Steer
- Illustrator: Nghiem Ta, Anne Yvonne Gilbert, John Howe, Tomislav Tomic, and Helen Ward
- Language: English
- Series: Ologies
- Subject: Magic
- Genre: Fantasy
- Publisher: Templar Publishing (UK); Candlewick Press (US)
- Publication date: 13 September 2005
- Publication place: United Kingdom
- Media type: Print (hardback)
- Pages: 32 pp (first edition)
- ISBN: 978-0-7636-2895-6
- OCLC: 61410085
- Dewey Decimal: 133.4/3 22
- LC Class: BF1611 .S796 2005
- Preceded by: Egyptology: Search for the Tomb of Osiris
- Followed by: Pirateology: A Pirate Hunter's Companion

Wizardology: The Book of the Secrets of Merlin is the third book in the Ologies series, created and published by Templar Publishing in the UK in 2005, and published by Candlewick Press in North America. The book is marketed as having been written by the mythical wizard Merlin, having been originally discovered in the year 1588 and now being revealed to the world for the first time.

Wizardology is filled with useful spells and magical information. Readers can unveil novelty elements throughout; there are numerous pockets, flaps, secret codes, and scavenger hunts hidden throughout the book.

The author is Dugald Steer, while the book was designed by Nghiem Ta, and features the artwork of Helen Ward, Tomislav Tomic, John Howe, and Anne Yvonne Gilbert.

== Plot ==
The book is presented as a guide to wizardry narrated by the fictional wizard, Merlin. Merlin describes magical practices from around the world, such as spells, familiars and potions. There's also a secret message within, decoded via a series of hidden symbols.

== Contents ==
- Chapter I: The Work of a Wizard
- Chapter II: A Wizard's Map of the World
- Chapter III: The Master Wizard's Workshop
- Chapter IV: A Wizard's Robes & Tools
- Chapter V: Spellcraft
- Chapter VI: A Wizard's Loyal Familiars
- Chapter VII: A Wizard's Menagerie of Magical Beasts
- Chapter VIII: Magical Flight & Flying Carpets
- Chapter IX: Potions, Healing & Magical Transformations
- Chapter X: Amulets, Talismans & Magical Items
- Chapter XI: Divination & Crystal Gazing
- Chapter XII: Alchemy, Astronomy & the New Sciences
- Chapter XIII: Famous Wizards of History
- Conclusion, or The Mystery of Wizardology Revealed and Concealed

== Awards and honors ==
- 2006: shortlisted for British Book Awards Children's Book of the Year

== In other media ==
=== Video games ===
In 2007, Codemasters acquired the rights to create video games for the Wii and Nintendo DS based on Wizardology, as well as Dragonology and Pirateology. Nik Nak was to develop the Wii titles. Only Dragonology game was produced for Nintendo DS, while other games based on the books were cancelled.

=== Planned film adaptations ===
In 2018, Paramount Pictures acquired the rights to develop a film franchise based on all Ologies books, including a Wizardology portion of the series. Akiva Goldsman was hired to oversee a writers' room to write scripts for interconnected family films based on the books and supplemental materials, partnering with Weed Road studio colleague Greg Lessans as the film's producers.
