= Run to the Stars =

1982 novel by Michael Scott Rohan

Run to the Stars is a novel by Michael Scott Rohan published in 1982.

== Plot summary ==
Run to the Stars is a novel in which the hero must overcome the corrupt government of Earth and escape.

== Reception ==
Dave Langford reviewed Run to the Stars for White Dwarf #40, and stated that "Though slow-moving to begin with, and relying on a truly boggling coincidence at the climax, this is a superior SF adventure from an author I know well (bias declared) and whom I hate for getting a fanletter from Ursula Le Guin on his first published story."

Dave Pringle reviewed Run to the Stars for Imagine magazine, and stated that "At base it's a conventional SF scenario: muscular hero and sexy-but-brainy girlfriend escape from a bureaucratic Earth and make their romantic run to the stars. However, it is all done with marvellous bravura and the narrative fairly crackles with energy. 'Banzai! Arrigato!'"

== Reviews ==
- Barry H. Reynolds (1986) in Fantasy Review, September 1986
- Tom Easton (1986) in Analog Science Fiction/Science Fact, Mid-December 1986, (1986)
- Martyn Taylor (1984) in Paperback Inferno, Volume 7, Number 4
- Mark Westerby (1990) in Fear, February 1990
- Terry Broome (1990) in Paperback Inferno, #83
