= The Snow Queen (Once Upon a Time) =

- Once Upon a Time episode
- Episode no.: Season 4 Episode 7
- Directed by: Billy Gierhart
- Written by: Edward Kitsis & Adam Horowitz
- Production code: 407
- Original air date: November 9, 2014

Guest appearances
- Sarah Bolger as Aurora; Georgina Haig as Elsa; Sean Maguire as Robin Hood; Elizabeth Mitchell as Snow Queen/Ingrid; Sally Pressman as Helga; Jessy Schram as Cinderella/Ashley; Pascale Hutton as Gerda/Queen of Arendelle; John Rhys-Davies as Grand Pabbie; Jonathan Runyon as the Duke of Weselton; Brighton Sharbino as Young Ingrid; Bailey Herbert as Young Helga; Ava Marie Telek as Young Gerda; Greg Webb as King Harald/King of Arendelle; Ryan Booth as Brutal Man

Episode chronology
← Previous "Family Business"	Next → "Smash the Mirror"
- Once Upon a Time season 4

"The Snow Queen" is the seventh episode of the fourth season of the American fantasy drama series Once Upon a Time, which aired on November 9, 2014.

This episode centers around the Snow Queen as she is interrogated by Emma Swan, while flashbacks show The Snow Queen's past.

== Title card ==
A kite flies in the forest as snow falls.

== Plot ==
=== Event chronology ===
The Arendelle events take place many years before "A Tale of Two Sisters". The Enchanted Forest events take place after Geppetto's parents are turned into marionettes in "That Still Small Voice" (the marionettes can be seen in Rumplestiltskin's castle) and many years before Anna visits the Enchanted Forest in "White Out". The Storybrooke events take place after "Family Business".

=== In The Characters' Past ===
==== Early years ====
In Arendelle, Ingrid, Helga, and Gerda are chasing a kite that later hits a tree. After they pull it down, the kite's owner arrives, but instead of thanking them attempts to kidnap them. After being kicked by the kite owner, Ingrid unleashes her power and freezes a tree, causing a branch to break off and fall on the kite owner, killing him. Stunned by Ingrid's powers, the sisters decide to keep it a secret and place the ribbons from the kite on their wrists, vowing to be there and protect each other. In these flashback scenes, young versions of Ingrid, Helga, and Gerda are shown, with actress Brighton Sharbino portraying a young Ingrid.

==== Many Years Later ====
Years later, the sisters are preparing to attending their father King Harald's 70th birthday bash. Helga introduces her date, the Duke of Weselton, to her father. Ingrid decides not to join her sisters but takes a brief moment to look before returning to her room after her loneliness causes it to snow inside. Her sisters return from the party to find Ingrid preparing to run away. After assuring Ingrid that she is not a monster and that running away won't fix anything, Gerda suggests visiting Rumplestiltskin. He suggests that they trade him their ribbons in exchange for a pair of gloves that can help suppress Ingrid's powers and an urn that can imprison her in case the gloves fail. Despite her sisters insistence that their love is stronger than any magic, Ingrid fearfully forces them to hand over the ribbons.

Back in Arendelle, the Duke sees Ingrid sitting in a gazebo, but instead of waiting on Helga, he tries to seduce Ingrid, who then uses her power to push him away. When Helga arrives, he lies to her about what happened, but Helga knows that he lied and turns down his marriage proposal. As the Duke tells the two that he plans to expose Ingrid to all of Arendelle, Ingrid attempts to freeze the Duke, but he pulls Helga in front of him, causing Ingrid to freeze her instead. As a stunned Ingrid kneels by her frozen sister, Helga's body crumbles into a pile of ice shards. As Gerda shows up, she is stunned by what Ingrid did to Helga. Refusing to believe her and fearing that Ingrid has become a danger to everyone around her, Gerda takes the urn and traps a sobbing Ingrid inside. Later, Gerda goes to the Grand Pabbie and asks him to make a potion that will cause the residents of Arendelle to forget Ingrid and Helga ever existed in order to protect the future of the kingdom. He warns her that magic comes at a price but agrees to make the memory potion.

=== In Storybrooke ===
The Snow Queen/ Ingrid has set up shop in the clock tower, and conjures up her mirror for her latest plot. At the sheriff's station, Emma Swan tests out a spell with Elsa that they can use on Ingrid. Emma later visits a "Mommy & Me" class to see Mary Margaret along with Ashley and Aurora. Emma is stunned to see her mother tell the others about being a mother for the "first" time, and after Mary Margaret sees her accidentally boiling the milk in Neal's bottle with her hand, she backs away in horror keeping Emma from holding her brother. Emma then gets a call from David saying they found Ingrid at the clock tower, where Emma uses the candle spell on her, creating a pair of hand cuffs. Emma then takes her in for questioning at the station, where, as expected, Ingrid is using the arrest to play mind games with her foster daughter. As David, Hook, Belle, and Elsa look at the mirror, Belle notices that the mirror is a fake, prompting David and Hook to warn Emma, and to get Gold to help them.

As the questioning continues, Ingrid admits to Emma that she wants her to be part of her family, but then uses mind tactics on Emma to convince her that her family do not love her, they fear her. Emma denies this, but as she pauses for a second, Ingrid casts a spell on a glass of water, and when she returns Ingrid increases the pressure on Emma, resulting in the glass of water to boil as Emma's powers are unleashed due to her anger, causing the wall in the station to blast open and Ingrid to escape. Ingrid's mind games have caused Emma to completely lose control over her powers. Emma then walks out and as David, Mary Margaret, Hook, Elsa, Gold, and Belle show up to stop her, Emma tries to tell everyone to stay away but when Hook touches her, she causes the streetlight to fall on David. Emma runs away after a horrified Mary Margaret looks at her with disgust and gets into her car driving away even as Mary Margaret calls after her that it's okay. Everyone present suspects that The Snow Queen/Ingrid has succeeded in turning Emma against them. After Elsa and Hook are unable to find Emma, Mary Margret blames herself, stating that no one wants their family to see them as a monster. Elsa reassures a fearful Hook that Emma will be fine, but that she needs time alone to come to terms with her powers, the way she did. Meanwhile, a terrified Emma sits in her parked bug in the woods overlooking the town.

Meanwhile, Regina attempts to find out the answers in the fairy tale book when Robin Hood shows up to tell her that his heart is still with Regina, but Regina tells him that he should be with Marian and wants him out of her life. Later on at Granny's, Robin spots Will, and the two make up for lost time over their lost loves as well as to patch things up between the two. Robin later returns to the vault to see Regina, and he kisses her, breaking his code to be loyal to Marian.

Finally, Gold receives a visit from The Snow Queen, who is ready to make a deal with him, as she has now figured out what his plan is. The Snow Queen knows that Gold wants to leave Storybrooke with Belle and Henry, and to be free of the Dagger of Kris, while the Snow Queen wants Storybrooke all to herself, and she says that she has the secret to the missing ingredient he needs. She then asks for the ribbons, and as he gives them to her, the Snow Queen whispers the secret into his ear. Then, Mr. Gold says that he will obtain the final ingredient with great pleasure, causing the Snow Queen to stare at him with a shocked expression.

== Production ==
This episode title is named after the snow queen because it tells her life story and background of why she's planning what she's planning.

== Reception ==
=== Ratings ===
The outing was down a tenth from the previous episode, scoring a 2.5/7 among 18-49s with 7.42 million viewers tuning in.

In Canada, it garnered 1.893 million viewers, making it the most-watched broadcast that night.

=== Reviews ===
The episode received positive reviews from critics.

In a review from Entertainment Weekly, Hilary Busis notes that "Tonight's Once is an exploration of control—and more specifically, what happens when people lose it. Basically, there are two possible outcomes: the terrible one (murdering your sister, murdering the guy who's trying to kidnap your sister, murdering an innocent brick wall), and the super-duper hot one (macking on a woman who is very much not your wife)."

Amy Ratcliffe of IGN rated the episode 7.9 out of 10, saying "The backstories of Once Upon a Time's villains don't always fit, but the Snow Queen's past was heartbreaking and matches the person she's become. The path from origin to foe was crystal clear, and while the Snow Queen suffered, they didn't make her too sympathetic. The plot in the present wasn't as solid as the flashbacks, but it did introduce a potential turning point for Emma and that character could use more development."

TV Fanatic gave the episode 4.6 out of 5 stars.

== See also ==
- The Snow Queen, an 1845 fairy tale by Hans Christian Andersen
- Snow Queen (disambiguation)
