= Dragonology: The Complete Book of Dragons =

2003 fantasy book by Dugald Steer

- Dragonology first edition cover
- Author: Dugald Steer
- Illustrator: Helen Ward, Wayne Anderson, Nghiem Ta, Chris Forsey, A. J. Wood, and Douglas Carrel
- Language: English
- Series: Ologies
- Subject: Dragons
- Genre: Fantasy
- Publisher: Templar Publishing (UK); Candlewick Press (US)
- Publication date: 1 October 2003
- Publication place: United Kingdom
- Media type: Print (hardback)
- Pages: 32 pp (first edition)
- ISBN: 978-1-84011-503-1
- OCLC: 56804900
- Followed by: Egyptology: Search for the Tomb of Osiris

Dragonology: The Complete Book of Dragons is the first book in the Ologies series, written by Dugald Steer and created and published by Templar Publishing in the UK, and published by Candlewick Press in North America.

== Overview ==
The fictional premise of the book is that it is a facsimile of a lost work originally printed in 1895 and purportedly written by a dragonologist named Dr. Ernest Drake with the current publisher being unable to determine the truth of the matter. It presents the research and findings of Dr. Ernest Drake on the dragons of the world, their biology, behavior, and history of their interactions with humans. The book is lavishly illustrated and contains a number of smaller, additional texts and tactile "specimens" such as dragon scales, dragon wing membrane, and dragon dust.

== Format ==
This book, like the other books in the Ologies series, is assigned a fictional "author" who then acts as the book's narrator. Dr. Ernest Drake is the fictional author and owner of the original Complete Book of Dragons. Real-life author Dugald Steer is the creator of the Drake character and the writer of this and several other books in the series. It is written in an encyclopedic manner rather than following any particular narrative, while also giving the reader puzzles in the book and small notes as if the fictional writer had sent them that book.

== Related media ==
Dragonology: The Complete Book of Dragons was followed up by a number of additional Dragonology books (and other merchandise), including Tracking and Taming Dragons: Vol. 1 and Vol. 2, Dr. Ernest Drake's Dragonology Handbook: A Practical Course in Dragons, and Drake's Comprehensive Compendium of Dragonology among others. There were 14 more main books published in the Ologies series as of 2025. While these are authored by Dugald Steer, only Monsterology: The Complete Book of Fabulous Beasts has any connection to the Dragonology books and Dr. Ernest Drake.

Dugald Steer also wrote a series of children's books called the Dragonology Chronicles based around the lore created in the Dragonology books. There are four books in this series: The Dragon's Eye published in 2006, The Dragon Diary published in 2008, The Dragon's Apprentice published in 2011, and The Dragon Prophecy published in 2012.

== Planned film adaptations ==
In 2008, Universal Pictures acquired the film rights to the Dragonology series and Leonard Hartman was set to write and executive produce the adaptation. Alex Kurtzman and Roberto Orci were attached to produce the film for Universal. In 2018, Paramount Pictures acquired Dragonology: The Complete Book of Dragons and the other books in the Ologies series. Akiva Goldsman was hired to oversee a writers' room to write scripts for interconnected family films based on the books and supplemental materials, partnering with Weed Road studio colleague Greg Lessans as the film's producers.

== See also ==
- Dragonology
