= Maid Marian =

Love interest of Robin Hood in English folklore

- Tales of Robin Hood and his Merry Men character
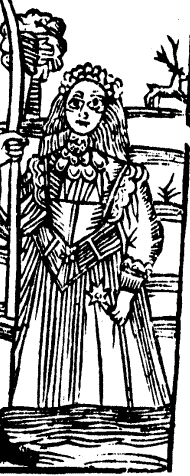
- Woodcut of Maid Marian, from a 17th-century broadside
- First appearance: 16th century AD
- Created by: Anonymous balladeers

In-universe information
- Aliases: Maid Marion; Clorinda; Matilda; Marian Fitzwalter/Fitzwater; Lady Marion of Leaford
- Occupation: Shepherdess (earlier stories); Noblewoman (later stories)
- Family: Robert Fitzwalter/Fitzwater (father, in some stories)
- Spouse: Robin Hood (in some stories)
- Significant other: Robin Hood
- Religion: Christian
- Nationality: English or Norman

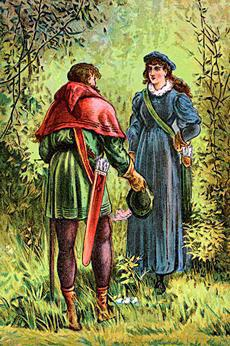
Robin Hood and Maid Marian (poster, c. 1880)

Maid Marian is the heroine of the Robin Hood legend in English folklore, often taken to be his lover. She is not mentioned in the early, medieval versions of the legend, but stemmed from a different May Day tradition that was the subject of at least two plays by 1600. After joining the Robin Hood legends, in the tales her history and circumstances are varied, though she generally is shown as being given high respect in Robin's circle for her courage and independence as well as her beauty and loyalty.

== History ==
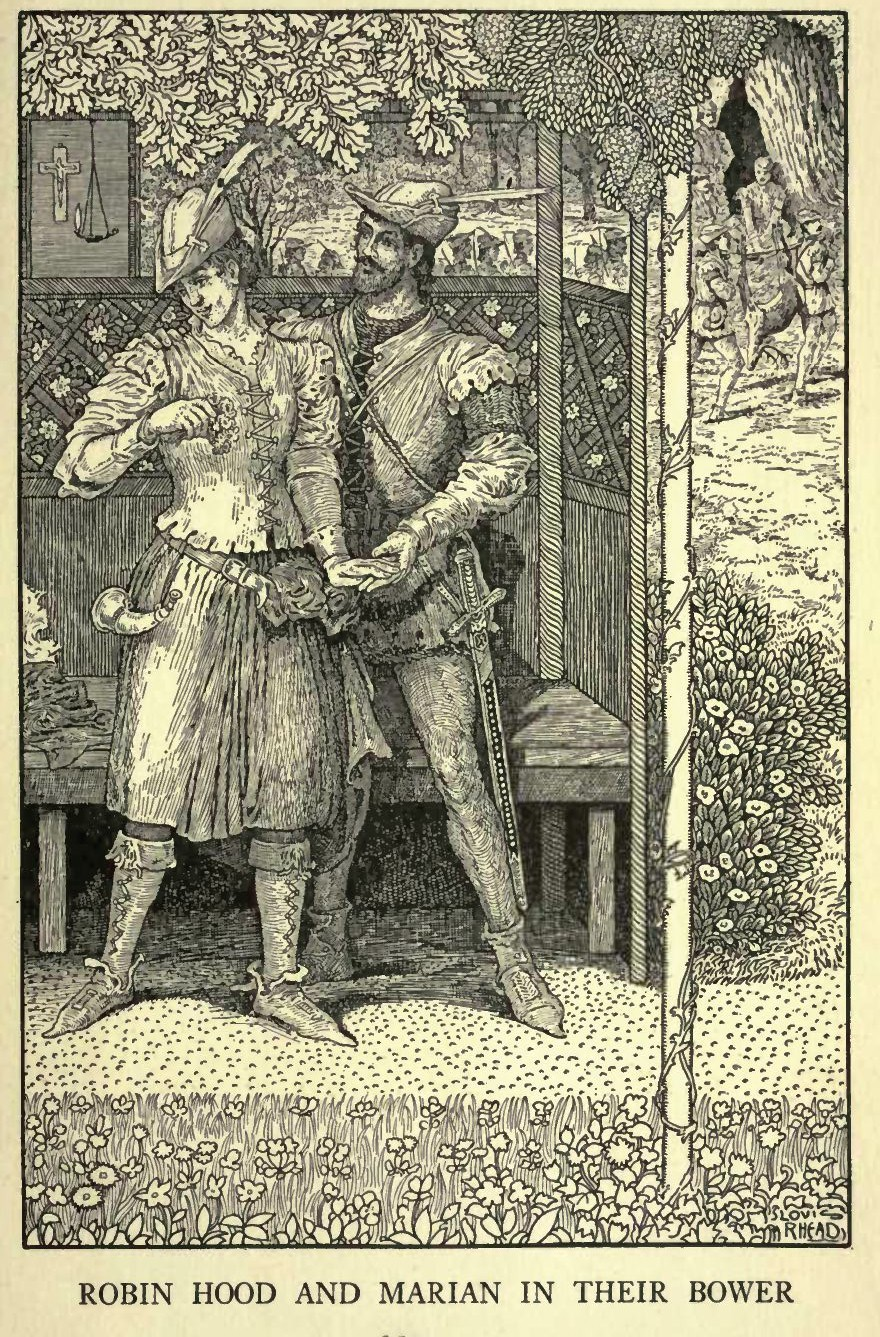
Robin Hood and Marian in their Bower (1912). Maid Marian wears a Tyrolean hat and carries a hunting horn.

=== May Day ===
Maid Marian (or Marion) is never mentioned in any of the earliest extant ballads of Robin Hood. She appears to have been a character in May Games festivities (held during May and early June although it could be rarely held mid June, most commonly around Whitsun) and is sometimes associated with the Queen or Lady of May or May Day. In The Quest for Robin Hood, Jim Lees suggests that Maid Marian was originally a personification of the Virgin Mary.

Both a "Robin" and a "Marian" character were associated with May Day by the 15th century, but these figures were apparently part of separate traditions; the Marian of the May Games is likely derived from the French tradition of a shepherdess named Marion and her shepherd lover Robin, recorded in Adam de la Halle's Le Jeu de Robin et Marion, circa 1283. It isn't clear if there was an association of the early "outlaw" character of Robin Hood and the early "May Day" character Robin, but they did become identified, and associated with the "Marian" character, by the 16th century. Alexander Barclay, writing in c. 1500, refers to "some merry fytte of Maid Marian or else of Robin Hood". Marian remained associated with May Day celebrations even after the association of Robin Hood with May Day had again faded.

The early Robin Hood is also given a "shepherdess" love interest, in Robin Hood's Birth, Breeding, Valor, and Marriage (Child Ballad 149), his sweetheart is "Clorinda the Queen of the Shepherdesses". Clorinda survives in some later stories as an alias of Marian. Francis James Child notes that the early mentions of Friar Tuck (another May Games character) are in association with Marian. By the mid 16th century the May Games had become increasingly bawdy, and in one play Robin even gives Marian to Friar Tuck as a concubine: "She is a trul of trust, to serue a frier at his lust/a prycker a prauncer a terer of shetes/a wagger of ballockes when other men slepes."

=== Noblewoman ===
The "gentrified" Robin Hood character, portrayed as a historical outlawed nobleman, emerges in the late 16th century. From this time, Maid Marian is cast in terms of a noblewoman, but her role was never entirely virginal, and she retained aspects of her "shepherdess" or "May Day" characteristics; in 1592, Thomas Nashe described the Marian of the later May Games as being played by a male actor named Martin, and there are hints in the play of Robin Hood and the Friar that the female character in these plays had become a lewd parody. Robin originally was called Ryder.

In the play, The Downfall of Robert, Earl of Huntingdon by Anthony Munday, which was written in 1598, Marian appears as Robin's lawfully-wedded wife, who changes her name from Matilda when she joins him in the greenwood. She also has a cousin called Elizabeth de Staynton who is described as being the Prioress of Kirklees Priory near Brighouse in West Yorkshire. The 19th century antiquarian, Joseph Hunter, identified a Robert Hood, yeoman from Wakefield, Yorkshire, in the archives preserved in the Exchequer, whose personal story matched very closely the story of Robin in Anthony Munday's play, and this Robert Hood also married a woman named Matilda, who changed her name to Marian when she joined him in exile in Barnsdale Forest (following the Battle of Boroughbridge) in 1322, and who also had a cousin named Elizabeth de Staynton who was Prioress of Kirklees Priory. If these parallels are not coincidental, then the Marian of Robin Hood fame, whose origins may be distinct from the Marian of the May games or of Monday's play, may derive all her roots from her association with the historical Robert Hood of Wakefield.

In an Elizabethan play, Anthony Munday identified Maid Marian with the historical Matilda, daughter of Robert Fitzwalter, who had to flee England because of an attempt to assassinate King John (legendarily attributed to King John's attempts to seduce Matilda). The "Matilda" theory of Maid Marian is further discussed in In later versions of Robin Hood, Maid Marian is commonly named as "Marian Fitzwalter", the only child of the Earl of Huntingdon.

In Robin Hood and Maid Marian (Child Ballad 150, perhaps dating to the 17th century), Maid Marian is "a bonny fine maid of a noble degree" said to excel both Helen and Jane Shore in beauty. Separated from her lover, she dresses as a page "and ranged the wood to find Robin Hood," who was himself disguised, so that the two begin to fight when they meet. As is often the case in these ballads, Robin Hood loses the fight to comical effect, and Marian only recognizes him when he asks for quarter. This ballad is in the "Earl of Huntington" tradition, a supposed "historical identity" of Robin Hood forwarded in the late 16th century.

=== 20th century ===
20th-century pop culture adaptations of the Robin Hood legend almost invariably have featured a Maid Marian and mostly have made her a highborn woman with a rebellious or tomboy character. In 1938's The Adventures of Robin Hood, she is a courageous and loyal woman (played by Olivia de Havilland), and a ward of the court, an orphaned noblewoman under the protection of King Richard. Although always ladylike, her initial antagonism to Robin springs not from aristocratic disdain but from aversion to robbery.

In The Story of Robin Hood and His Merrie Men (1952), although being a lady-in-waiting to Eleanor of Aquitaine during the Crusades, Marion is a mischievous tomboy capable of fleeing boldly to the countryside disguised as a boy. In the Kevin Costner epic, Robin Hood: Prince of Thieves, she is a maternal cousin to the sovereign, while in the BBC adaption of 2006, she is the daughter of the former sheriff and was betrothed to Robin before his leaving for the Holy Land, and in his absence embarked on her own crusade against poverty in aiding the poor in a fashion similar to what Robin later achieved, becoming a skilled fighter in the process and leading the people to refer to her as 'The Night Watchman'. Theresa Tomlinson's Forestwife novels (1993–2000) are told from Marian's point of view and portray her as a high-born Norman girl escaping entrapment in an arranged marriage. With the aid of her nurse, she runs away to Sherwood Forest, where she becomes acquainted with Robin Hood and his men.

== Literature ==
There have been several books based on the fictional character:

- Maid Marian – 1822 novel by Thomas Love Peacock
- Maid Marian – 2004 novel by Elsa Watson
- Lady of the Forest; novel by Jennifer Roberson
- Lady of Sherwood; novel by Jennifer Roberson
- The Forestwife (and its sequels, although she's only the main character in the first); young adult novel by Theresa Tomlinson.
- The Outlaws of Sherwood, novel by Robin McKinley (depicts Marian as a crack-shot archer)
- Maid Marian appears in a chapter of T.H. White's The Sword in the Stone, the first book in The Once and Future King. Wart (the young King Arthur) and his step brother Kay meet her and Robin when they go into the forest for an adventure and set out with the outlaws to rescue people Morgan le Fey kidnapped. When they meet her, it is quickly made apparent that Marian is strong and capable in battle and the narrator mentions that she could walk or even wiggle on her stomach like a snake faster than the boys could follow.
- The "Robin & Marian Mysteries" by Clayton Emery, appearing in Ellery Queen's Mystery Magazine and elsewhere, feature the outlaw husband-wife team as amateur detectives solving bizarre murders.
- Mentioned in The Dark Tower V: Wolves of the Calla, by Stephen King. Said to be the maid of Lady Oriza (a rice God and heroine), who helped her trick and kill the outlaw Gray Dick and then "went on to have many fanciful adventures of her own".
- In the gender-bending play Marian, or the True Tale of Robin Hood, written by Adam Szymkowicz, it turns out that the "outlaw Robin Hood" is actually Marian in disguise, with one actress playing both parts.

== Television ==
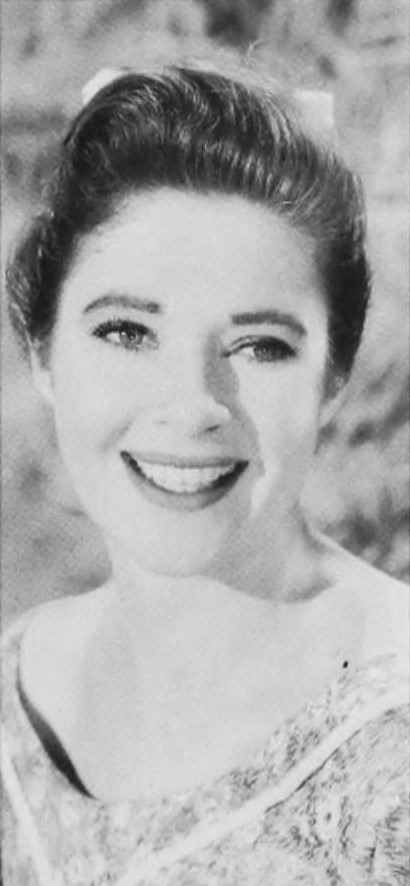
Bernadette O'Farrell as Maid Marian

- Maid Marian was played by Josée Richard in the 1953 BBC mini-series Robin Hood. (She was married to Robert Robinson).
- Maid Marian was played first by Bernadette O'Farrell, and then by Patricia Driscoll in the 1955 series The Adventures of Robin Hood and was as adept with the bow as Robin. As Lady Marian Fitzwater, a Norman-Irish noblewoman, she rode a horse sidesaddle and when dressed in Lincoln Green with Robin in Sherwood Forest she rode astride. The Sheriff was always ready to defend her, but his replacement the Deputy Sheriff suspected she was one of Robin's band.
- Maid Marian was featured in the 1966 animated series Rocket Robin Hood, a science fiction version of the Robin Hood story.
- In the 1975 ABC-TV Mel Brooks parody series, When Things Were Rotten, Maid Marian was portrayed by Misty Rowe.
- In the HTV show Robin of Sherwood (1984–86), Marian was played by Judi Trott. After meeting and falling in love with Robin (of Locksley, played by Michael Praed), she marries and lives with him and the other outlaws in Sherwood Forest. When Robin died, she was pardoned by King John. When she attended a party at the Earl of Huntington's residence, she was wooed by his son Robert of Huntingdon (played by Jason Connery). He became Robin's successor as Herne's Son and leader of the outlaws. Robert (Robin) and Marion nearly marry until she mistakenly believes him to have been killed. She then decides to become a nun for the foreseeable future, believing that is the right, and only thing worth doing.
- Maid Marian was the lead character in Tony Robinson's 1989 BBC children's comedy Maid Marian and Her Merry Men. In the show, Marian (played by Kate Lonergan) was portrayed as the real leader of the Merry Men, whilst Robin was a vain coward who was mistakenly believed to be the leader by King John and the Sheriff of Nottingham.
- In the 1990 Japanese anime series Robin Hood no Daibōken, Maid Marian (as Marian Lancaster) was voiced by Naoko Matsui in Japanese and Katherine Shannon in English. Sometimes referred to as Mary Anne.
- In the animated series Young Robin Hood, Maid Marian (Voiced by Anik Matern) is Robin's sweetheart and a ward at Nottingham; she sometimes suspected of conspiring with him. She frequently wore tan tights with a green men's shirt and a headband and was depicted as the equal of any of the Merry Men.
- In the 1991 TV film Robin Hood, she is played by Uma Thurman.
- In the 1997 TV series The New Adventures of Robin Hood, she was played by Anna Galvin, and then by Barbara Griffin. She lives with Robin, Little John and Friar Tuck in Sherwood Forest.
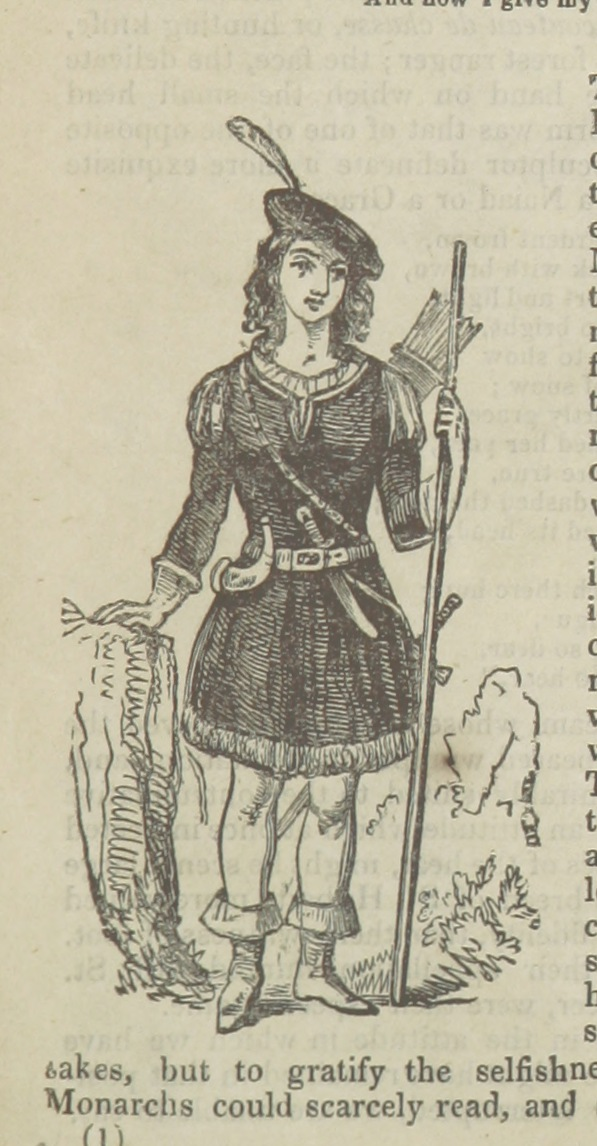
- "Maid Marian, the Forest Queen, being a companion to 'Robin Hood'." From an 1849 book.
  In the 2000 film Blackadder: Back & Forth, Maid Marian is portrayed by supermodel Kate Moss.
- In the BBC's 2006 version Robin Hood, Lucy Griffiths plays the role of Lady Marian, as opposed to Maid Marian. In this version of the tale, she is daughter of a previous Sheriff of Nottingham and the love interest of Robin. Beautiful and quick of mind, Marian is headstrong and feisty. She is involved in a love triangle, with Sir Guy of Gisbourne and Robin as her suitors.
- Maid Marian appears in the Once Upon a Time episode "Lacey" played by Christie Laing. Maid Marian is the target for the affection of the Sheriff of Nottingham. She runs away with Robin Hood after falling in love with him (and later marrying him). Sometime later, Marian is pregnant and falls ill, causing Robin to obtain a magic wand from Rumplestiltskin's castle to heal her. After successfully curing her, Rumplestiltskin takes Belle to witness him killing Robin for stealing from him. However, after seeing the restored Marian and realizing her pregnancy, Belle begs Rumplestiltskin not to kill him or else the child would become fatherless. Rumplestiltskin purposely misses shooting him, alarming the pair to escape the woods. In "Quite a Common Fairy," a discussion between Robin and Rumplestiltskin's son Baelfire revealed that Maid Marian has died leaving Robin and his Merry Men into taking care of their child Roland. In "Snow Drifts" and "There's No Place Like Home," Emma Swan and Killian Jones travel back in time, and when Emma discovers a woman is about to be killed by the Evil Queen for helping Snow White escape, she wants to save her but Jones worries about consequences. Emma is later imprisoned with the woman but both escape and return to the present day. Only after that do they discover that the woman is Marian, and Regina is furious that her new boyfriend Robin has his wife back. Though he wants to be with Regina, Robin and his family leave town in an effort to save Marian's life from a magical illness and then reside in New York. Regina later discovers Marian was killed in the past by her half-sister Zelena, the Wicked Witch of the West who has been posing as Marian ever since. Regina and Emma rush to New York and reveal the truth only to be informed by Robin that Zelena is pregnant.
- In 2014, Maid Marian is portrayed by Sabrina Bartlett in an episode of Doctor Who called "Robot of Sherwood", with the Twelfth Doctor saving her from the Sheriff's dungeons before he learns of her identity or accepts that Robin is real.
- Maid Marian is featured in Robin Hood: Mischief in Sherwood, voiced by Sarah Natochenny.
- In the MGM+'s 2025 version, Marian is played by Lauren McQueen.

== Film ==
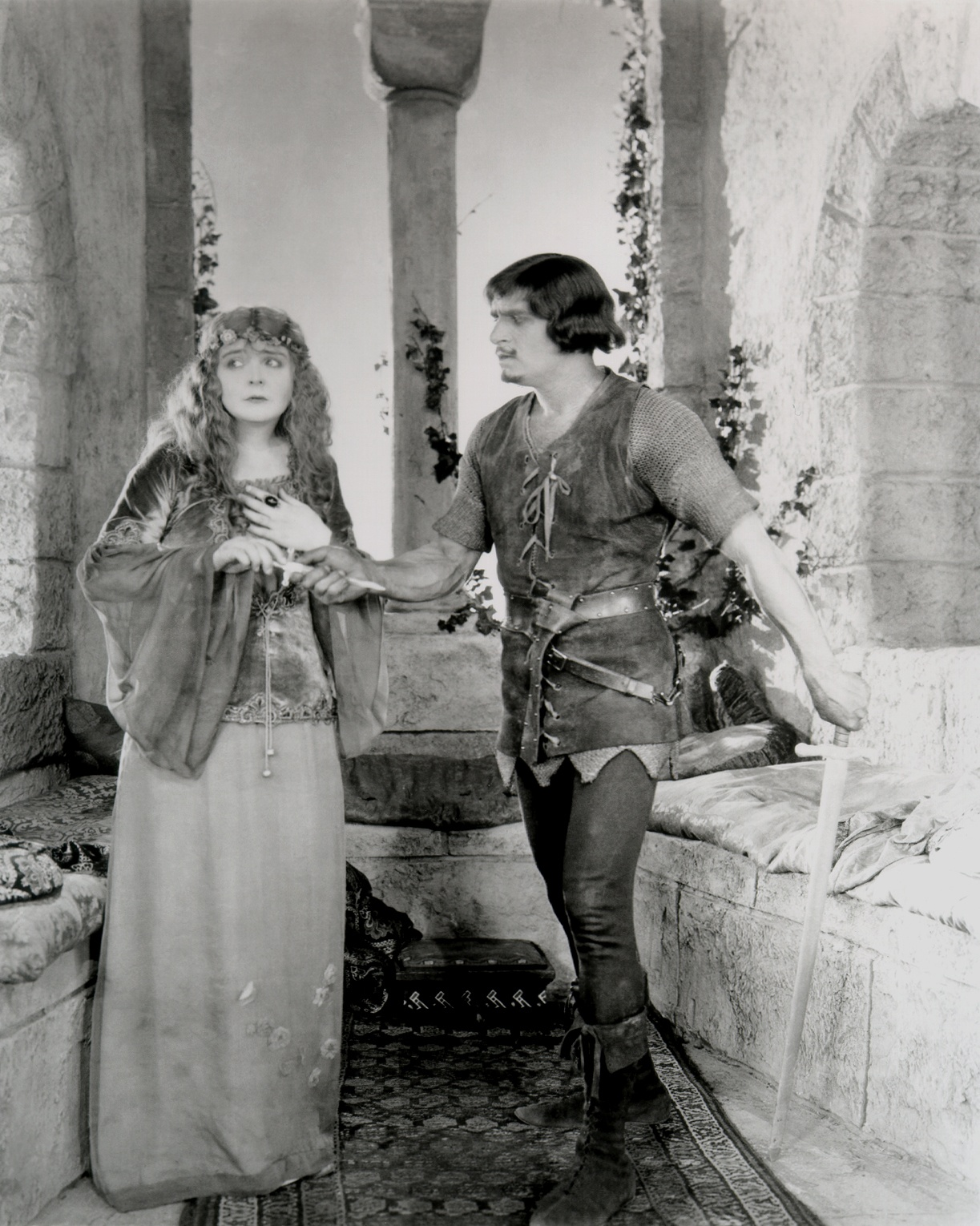
Douglas Fairbanks as Robin Hood giving Enid Bennett as Maid Marian a dagger

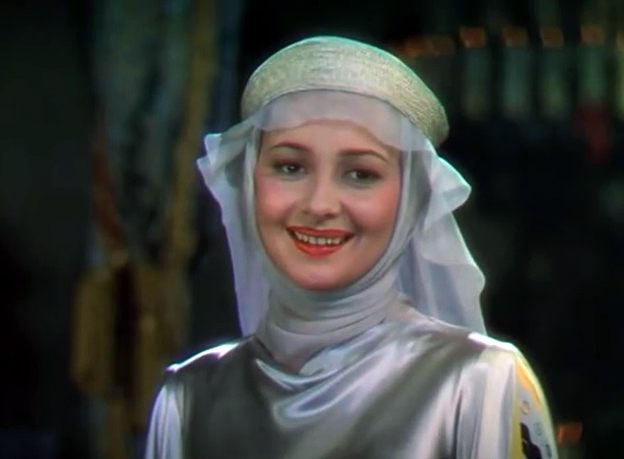
Olivia de Havilland as Maid Marian

- In the 1913 silent version of Robin Hood, Marian was played by Gerda Holmes.
- In the 1922 silent film version of Robin Hood, Marian was played by Enid Bennett.
- In the 1938 film The Adventures of Robin Hood, Maid Marian was portrayed by Olivia de Havilland.
- In the 1952 film The Story of Robin Hood and His Merrie Men, Maid Marian is played by Joan Rice.
- In the 1960 film Sword of Sherwood Forest, Maid Marian is played by Sarah Branch.
- In the 1964 film Robin and the 7 Hoods, transplanting the Robin Hood legend to a 1930s Chicago gangster setting, Marian is played by Barbara Rush, and is made into an utterly opportunistic character very different from that of the original legend.
- In the 1967 film A Challenge for Robin Hood, Lady Marian is played by Gay Hamilton.
- In the 1973 Disney animated version of Robin Hood, Maid Marian is an anthropomorphic vixen (female fox) voiced by Monica Evans.
- In the 1976 film Robin and Marian, Lady Marian is played by Audrey Hepburn. After Robin (Sean Connery) is wounded in his latest battle, Marian poisons Robin and herself as she recognizes that Robin will never fully recover from his injuries, Marian recognizing that he would rather die now than live as half of what he was.
- In the 1991 film Robin Hood, Maid Marian is played by Uma Thurman.
- In the 1991 film Robin Hood: Prince of Thieves, Maid Marian is played by Mary Elizabeth Mastrantonio. In this version, her surname is given as Dubois, a reference to the French name of Robin Hood, Robin des Bois.
- In the 1993 film Robin Hood: Men in Tights, Maid Marian is played by Amy Yasbeck.
- In the 2001 Disney film Princess of Thieves, Robin Hood and Maid Marian are the parents of a daughter, the eponymous 'princess' played by Keira Knightley.
- In the 2006 film Robin Hood: Quest for the King, Maid Marian is voiced by Jo Wyatt.
- In the 2010 Ridley Scott film Robin Hood, Lady Marion Loxley, played by Cate Blanchett, is a feisty, capable noblewoman with whom archer Robin Longstride, a.k.a. Robin Hood (Russell Crowe) falls in love whilst impersonating her deceased husband, Sir Robert Loxley.
- In the 2012 German film Robin Hood: Ghosts of Sherwood, Marian is played by Ramona Kuen.
- In the 2012 film Tom and Jerry: Robin Hood and His Merry Mouse, Marian is played by Red from Red Hot Riding Hood and is voiced by Grey DeLisle.
- In the 2018 film Robin Hood, Marian is portrayed by Eve Hewson.
