= Caíseal Mór =

Australian writer

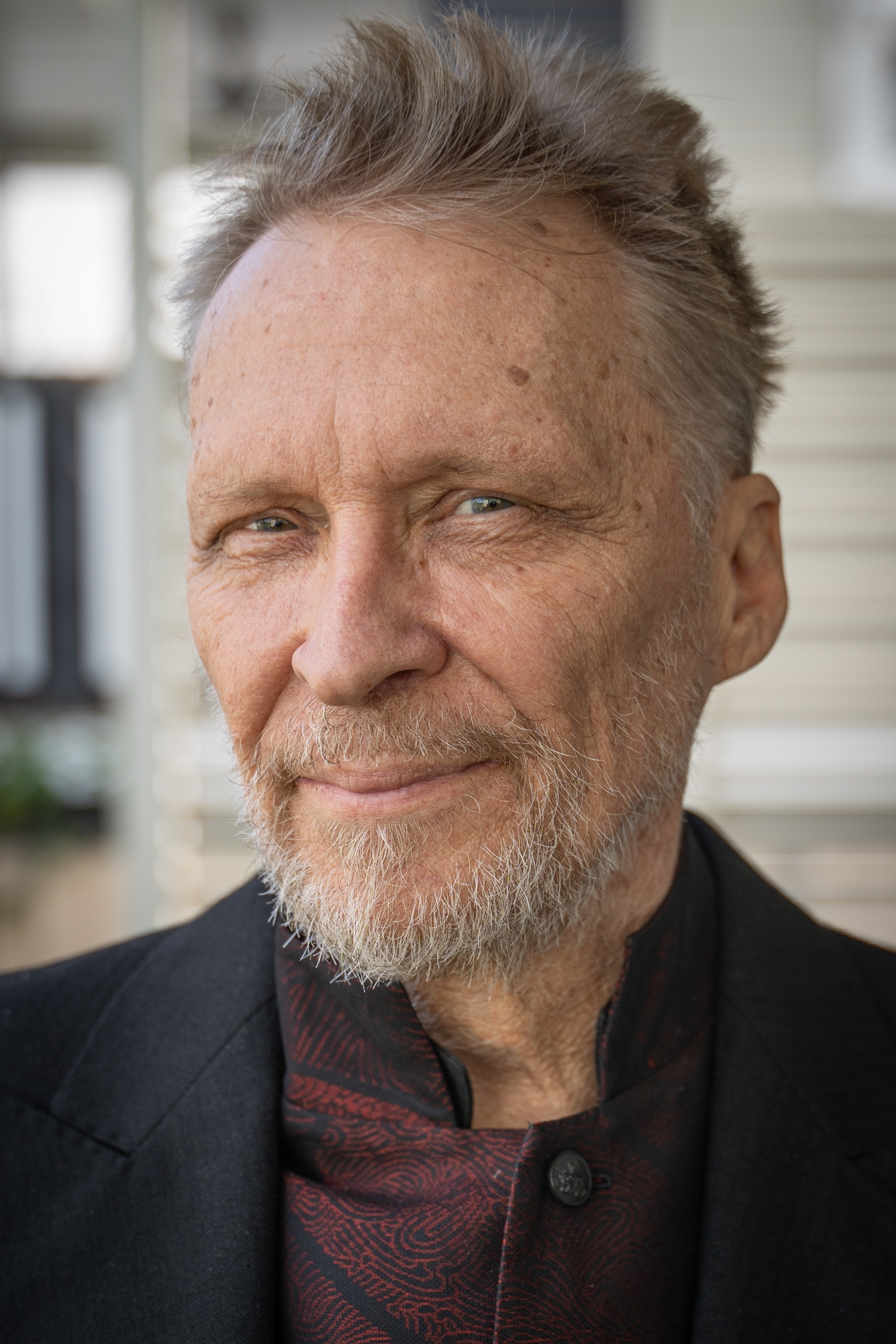
- Born: 1961; Queensland, Australia
- Died: 2023 (aged 61–62)
- Occupations: Writer, artist and musician
- Writing career
- Genres: Sci-fi and fantasy

Caíseal Mór (/ˈkæʃəl/, "Cash-el More"; 1961–2023) was an Australian sci-fi and fantasy novelist, actor, artist and musician.

== Early life and education ==
Caíseal Mór was born in far west Queensland, Australia, in 1961. His parents were Irish immigrants who ran a cattle station, and his first language was Gaelic, as is his first name (pronounced "cashel"), meaning "circular stone fort". He was also described as part Indigenous. He inherited a love of storytelling and music from his parents, and in a long-held family tradition, learned to play the brass-strung harp as a child.

As a child, Mór was diagnosed on the autism spectrum as a savant, which he later discussed in his autobiography A Blessing and a Curse; Autism and Me (2007), where he wrote about the profound difficulties he had as a child with conformity and the judgement of others. In the book, he also mentioned being diagnosed with dissociative identity disorder and post-traumatic stress disorder.

After returning from travels in India, Europe, and North Africa in 1986, Mór was encouraged by friends to audition for the performing arts degree programme at the University of Western Sydney (Theatre Nepean) in 1987. He graduated with a degree in performing arts in 1990.

== Influences and themes ==
In his early twenties Mór travelled through India, Europe, and North Africa, where he met musicians and yogis from the Hindu and Sufi traditions, and developed a love for non-Western music and instruments. In Turkey he was introduced to the Yaylı tambur, an instrument that later featured in his musical compositions. Mór travelled frequently to Ireland, Scotland, and Brittany, collecting stories, songs and music of these Celtic lands.

A few distinct themes recur throughout Mór's novels. He focused on an examination of religion versus spirituality; gods, deities, and spirits; magic; and technology. He also questioned the basis of authority and the focus of western culture on conformity. Most of his stories are set in early medieval Ireland and Scotland, and feature a personal interpretation of the Celtic Otherworld.

== Career ==
Mór worked as an actor, teacher, and musician. Straight after graduating, he started teaching drama and art in the Catholic education system. In late 1993 he resigned his teaching position.

=== Writing ===
Mór's first novel was the historical fiction fantasy, The Circle and The Cross, published in 1995.

Veil of the Gods (2018) is a series of graphic novels.

=== Music ===
Mór began creating musical art objects at university and later moved on to building shamanic style and tribal drums.

From around 2013 he collaborated with the singer and multi-instrumentalist Laya Rocha, with their early work "heavily influenced by Arabic, Turkish and Persian microtonal music". They released their first three albums under the band name Khatunaya. This was derived from ancient Persian, referring to a concept of heavenly bliss. Under this name, they ran a series of all-night concerts, known as the Dreaming Deep, which were based on Hindu and Sufi trance practices. An album of the same name was released in November 2016. After travelling to Mongolia and bringing in more guest musicians, they changed the band name to Moonlight Tribe, and created various versions of a work called Ninety-Nine Skies.

== Death ==
In 2023, Mór chose to undergo voluntary assisted dying following a diagnosis of stage 4 cancer.

== Recognition and awards ==
1999: Shortlisted, Best Novel, Ditmar Awards, for The Tilecutter's Penny

== Book titles ==
=== Science fiction/fantasy ===
- Veil Of The Gods (graphic novel series) (2018)

==== The Wanderers ====
- The Circle and the Cross (1995)
- The Song of the Earth (1996)
- The Water of Life (1997)

==== The Watchers ====
- The Meeting of the Waters (2002) (Illustrated by Anne Yvonne Gilbert US edition only)
- The King of Sleep (2002) (illustrated by Anne Yvonne Gilbert, US edition only)
- The Raven Game (2003) (illustrated by Anne Yvonne Gilbert, US edition only)

==== Wellspring Trilogy ====
- Well of Yearning (2004)
- Well of the Goddess (2005)
- Well of Many-Blessings (2005)

==== Other fantasy fiction ====
- The Tilecutters Penny (1998)
- The Harp at Midnight (1999)
- Carolan's Concerto (2001)
- Lady of the Lamp (2008)

=== Non-fiction ===
- Scratches in the Margin (1996)
- The Moon on the Lake (1995)
- What is Magic? (2009)
- What is Magic? the Ebook (2011)

=== Autobiography ===
- A Blessing and a Curse; Autism and Me (2007) published by Jessica Kingsley Publishers, published May 2007

== Music and spoken word albums ==
- Circle and the Cross (Companion to the novel of the same name) (1995 )
- Song of the Earth (Companion to the novel of the same name) (1996)
- Water of life (Companion to the novel of the same name) (1997)
- The Moon on the Lake (1998)
- Loom of Music (1999)
- [The Well of Yearning] (companion to Well-Spring Trilogy - books) (2002)
- Beautiful Hands (Celtic Harp) (2003)
- Divine Passion - Rain Water (2004)
- Divine Passion - Air (2005)
- What is Magic? (2009)
- Flow (2010)
- Alchemy for the Heart (Creative Trance) (2011)
- Dreaming Tree - Red (Creative Trance) (2012)
- Dreaming Tree - The Green Album (Dreaming Music and Creative Trance) (2013)
- Prana (2014)
- Dreaming Deep (2016)
- Ninety-Nine Skies (2016)
