= Lady of the Glen =

1996 novel by Jennifer Roberson

- First edition cover
- Author: Jennifer Roberson
- Illustrator: Anne Yvonne Gilbert
- Cover artist: Anne Yvonne Gilbert
- Language: English
- Genre: Historical fiction Romance
- Publisher: Kensington Books
- Publication date: April 1996
- Publication place: United States
- Pages: 420
- ISBN: 1-57566-022-9

Lady of the Glen: A Novel of 17th-Century Scotland and the Massacre of Glencoe is a 1996 historical fiction novel by American author Jennifer Roberson. It is a re-telling of the 1692 Massacre of Glencoe, and focuses on the romance between Catriona of Clan Campbell and Alasdair Og MacDonald of Clan Donald, each from rival clans.

Roberson was inspired to write the novel after learning of the massacre in a British history class, and waited 25 years until she felt ready to tell it. Lady of the Glen was published by Kensington Books in April 1996, with cover art by book illustrator Anne Yvonne Gilbert. A German translation was released in 2001.

== Plot summary ==
The novel is set amidst the background of the 1692 Massacre of Glencoe, which was ordered by King William III. Catriona of Clan Campbell, daughter of the Laird of Glenlyon, falls in love with Alasdair Og MacDonald, a member of a rival clan. Their love must endure the political machinations of King William and the Jacobites. In August 1691, William offers all Highland clans a pardon for their part in the Jacobite Uprising, as long as they took an oath of allegiance before 1 January 1692 in front of a magistrate. Alasdair struggles greatly to meet this deadline, as the message reached its recipients in mid-December, in difficult winter conditions, only a few weeks before the deadline. The tension of this political situation is mirrored by the fraught romance of Catriona and Alasdair.

== Development ==
Lady of the Glen was written by American author Jennifer Roberson. She learned of the Massacre of Glencoe in a British History class she took at Northern Arizona University, and thought "then it would make a terrific tale." She waited 25 years "until [she] felt ready to write it," as she wanted "to do right by the story." Roberson did not realize until she began her research in 1985 "how much story there was to tell, nor how dramatic." For research, the author read John Prebble's "outstanding and invaluable" 1966 work Glencoe and visited the site of the massacre itself. Roberson has admitted that while she desired to be as historically accurate as possible, she "occasionally relied on personal suppositions and interpretations, and, where necessary, significantly compressed the time frame and chronology of events to improve the story's pacing." According to her, all of the main characters are based on real people; a MacDonald did in fact marry a Campbell of Glen Lyon, though Roberson changed her name from Sarah to Catriona and made her the laird Glenlyon's daughter, not his niece. She later listed Lady of the Glen among her favorite works.

== Release and reception ==
The novel was released in April 1996 by Kensington Books, with cover art by book illustrator Anne Yvonne Gilbert. A German translation was published in 2001. Roberson stated in a March 2007 interview that a screenwriter had twice "optioned" the book but noted that this was true of many other works. Of all her period dramas, Roberson thought Lady of the Glen was best suited for film adaptation, and stated that she would love for Sean Connery to play the MacDonald laird.

Publishers Weekly gave Lady of the Glen a mixed review, criticizing it for "offer[ing] only a smidgen of suspense" due to its many flash-forwards. They did however laud Roberson for creating an "atmospherically real" Scotland, "which comes as no surprise from an author who writes acclaimed fantasies (the Sword-Dancer saga, etc.) as well as romances." Publishers Weekly concluded that those who enjoyed Roberson's 1992 novel Lady of the Forest would also like Lady of the Glen. Another reviewer described Lady of the Glen as being "a pleasure," and Kensington Publishing deemed the novel "similar in theme to the recent films Rob Roy and Braveheart." Lady of the Glen was listed among author Willa Blair's favorite historical fiction novels set in Scotland.
