= Smash the Mirror =

- Once Upon a Time episode
- Episode no.: Season 4 Episode 8
- Directed by: Eagle Egilsson (part 1); Ralph Hemecker (part 2)
- Written by: David H. Goodman & Jerome Schwartz
- Production code: 408 A/B
- Original air date: November 16, 2014
- Running time: 87 minutes

Guest appearances
- Scott Michael Foster as Kristoff; Georgina Haig as Elsa; Elizabeth Lail as Anna; Sean Maguire as Robin Hood; Elizabeth Mitchell as Snow Queen/Ingrid; Timothy Webber as Apprentice; Raf Rogers as Arendelle Servant; Lee Page as Arendelle Guard #1; Patrick Roccas as Arendelle Guard #2

Episode chronology
← Previous "The Snow Queen"	Next → "Fall"
- Once Upon a Time season 4

"Smash the Mirror" is the eighth episode of the fourth season of the American fantasy drama series Once Upon a Time, which aired on November 16, 2014. This episode has a length of two hours, making it the first time in the series' run that it aired a two-hour episode without the second part having a separate title; it has since been split into two separate episodes in subsequent airings. The episodes were filmed with a single production code, as confirmed by writer and co-executive producer Jane Espenson, and later separated.

In this episode, Emma Swan tries to control her magic, while flashbacks show Ingrid trying to pit Elsa and Anna against each other, and also making a deal with the Apprentice.

== Title card ==
Emma Swan's yellow Volkswagen Beetle drives through the forest for part 1 and snowflakes fall in the forest for part 2.

== Plot ==
=== Event chronology ===
The Arendelle events take place after "Family Business" and more than thirty years before "Fall". The Enchanted Forest events take place after "Family Business". The Land Without Magic flashback takes place in 1982, after "Operation Mongoose, Part 1" and immediately before the flashback with the Snow Queen in Boston in "Shattered Sight". The Storybrooke events take place after "The Snow Queen".

=== In the characters' past ===
Outside of the forest of Arendelle, Ingrid races off to find a place for the box containing the Sorcerer's Hat, freezing it over hiding it under a rock. Then, she heads to the Enchanted Forest to visit the Apprentice's cabin, and offers to make a deal with him: she'll return the box in exchange for the Sorcerer finding her a perfect match for a third sister she wants.

Back in Arendelle after the meeting, Ingrid is determined to use Elsa by manipulating her to turn on Anna. She 'warns' Elsa that her sister is plotting to trap her inside the urn, just as Gerda did to Ingrid in the past, instructing Elsa to talk to Anna herself in the palace dungeon cell. Unknown to Ingrid, Elsa is only pretending to believe her aunt, and when she visits Anna in her jail cell, the two sisters decide it is best to play along with Ingrid's lie. The two come up with a plan to place Ingrid back inside the urn when she least expects it; so Elsa breaks Anna out of the cell, and with help from Kristoff they search the closed-off east wing of the castle, and find the urn in a closet (along with a still-frozen Hans). They also find a cracked mirror with a missing fragment, which unknown to them, is the Mirror of Shattered Sight. A reluctant and concerned Elsa returns Anna to the dungeon, where Anna takes the urn into her cell to wait for Ingrid to come check on her. Unfortunately, Ingrid was on to their scheme; she had been waiting for Anna all along, and Anna finds herself trapped in the cell with her.

With Anna in chains, after threatening to kill her, Ingrid asks Anna to recall the tale of a king who lost his only daughter, and as a result, used a mirror to cast a spell on his whole kingdom, making them see only the worst qualities in those around them, leading them to kill each other. Ingrid uses a small shard of the mirror to cast the same spell, the Spell of Shattered Sight, on Anna, resulting in Anna becoming negative and resentful against Elsa for deserting her during their childhood. Perplexed and shocked by Anna's sudden cynical attitude towards her, Elsa suspects a spell has been cast on her sister when Anna comes to the dining room carrying the urn and saying only negative things about her. Ingrid demands that Elsa freeze Anna to prevent her from trapping Elsa inside of the urn; however, Elsa refuses to hurt her sister, crossing her arms to hold in her magic. Still under the spell, Anna traps Elsa inside the urn, even as Elsa tells her that no matter what she does, she will always love her. Elsa's love for Anna breaks the spell, but Anna realizes too late what she has done when Ingrid takes the urn from her before Anna can get her sister back, and Kristoff arrives in an attempt to stop Ingrid from hurting Anna and protect her. Unfortunately, Elsa's entrapment was not Ingrid's original plan, and in her anger, she uses her powers to freeze Anna, Kristoff, and the entire Kingdom of Arendelle in solid ice. Some time later, Rumplestiltskin appears in the dining room, finding Ingrid practicing her Rock Troll magic, pulling memories from Elsa, still inside the urn, over to a rock in her other hand. Rumplestiltskin asks her to give him the Sorcerer's Hat box that Anna took from him back in "The Apprentice"; when she refuses, he magically takes and hides the urn and a (still) frozen Anna's necklace, saying he will return them only in exchange for the box.

Ingrid returns to the cave to retrieve the box, but while attempting to call Rumplestiltskin, she is stopped by the Sorcerer's Apprentice, who, knowing that all she wants is happiness, tells her that if she gives the box to Rumplestiltskin, she will never find that happiness. Then, he tells her that the Sorcerer has decided to accept her deal, that he has divined that the third sister she wants will arrive in the future, and that she can be sent there - in exchange for the box. He also promises that one day she will be reunited with Elsa. Ingrid agrees to give the Apprentice the box, and thaws it out. The Apprentice conjures up a door for Ingrid to walk through, with her emerging in 1982 Boston.

=== In Storybrooke ===
In the forest, Emma, whose powers are still out of control, wakes up in her vehicle and finds Henry standing there, telling his mother that everyone was looking for her. But as he tries to approach Emma, she accidentally pushes him away with her magic, resulting in Henry's ear being cut. After Henry takes off, Emma is visited by Ingrid, who tells her that she should embrace her true self, but Emma takes off after the conversation, and heads to Gold's Pawn Shop, where Gold, sensing Emma was in the place by the way the items were coming to life, offered her a chance to rid herself of her powers, and gives her the location of a mansion as to where to meet him; unknown to Emma, Gold has other plans for her. Back at the loft, David, Mary Margaret, Killian and Elsa ponder their next plan by planning another search, when Henry arrives and tells them he found her, but failed to help her regain control of her magic.

In the Vault, Regina wakes up after she and Robin Hood spent the night together. As Robin wakes up to embrace Regina, she is more concerned with the Once Upon a Time book and explains to Robin that she wants to find her happy ending and the author. She later arrives at the loft with a locator spell to make their tracking of Emma easier. However, after Henry mentioned Emma drove off, Hook suspects Emma went to see Gold, so he sneaks off to call to and warn Emma about Gold's deception. Meanwhile, David and Mary Margret decide it might not be so bad if Emma got rid of her magic and became "normal," which causes Elsa, who overheard their conversation, to sneak out with the locator potion to try to find Emma on her own. Gold visits Ingrid and she realizes his plot to trap Emma in the Sorcerer's Hat and absorb her powers, so he can no longer be controlled by the Dark One's Dagger. When Ingrid tries to stop Gold, he uses a spell he collected from remnants of the urn, creating a force field to prevent Ingrid from warning Emma or interfering in the events to come. As Ingrid sees Emma traveling to the mansion, Ingrid uses her mirror to send an illusion of her to stop Emma. When Emma sees the sudden appearance of Ingrid's figure in the middle of the road, her car spins out of control and crashes, causing Emma to temporarily lose consciousness.

When Emma regains consciousness, she gets out of the car to confront Ingrid, believing that she was there. But Emma refuses to believe Ingrid when she warns her that Gold only wanted to hurt her for his own self-benefits. Emma notices that the image is an illusion as she tries to touch Ingrid, so she returns to the car and speeds off to the mansion. As Emma arrives at the place, Gold sets up the hat to absorb her and her powers in a closed room. Emma waits for Gold at the other side, and before she opens the door, Gold appears behind her, telling Emma that everything will be fine once her powers are gone, and that she will be able to live a normal life. Emma then thanks Gold, not knowing what will happen next as she ponders about opening the door.

At the loft, Regina has a chat with Henry about Emma, and tells him that he should be proud of his mother for having magic, then heals his ear. Henry mourns the fact that he is normal and has no special powers, but Regina insists that he possesses the heart of the truest believer and tells him that he is just as powerful as either one of his mothers, even without magic. Regina then goes downstairs to talk to Mary Margaret and David after overhearing that they believe Emma is doing the right thing in getting rid of her powers. Regina talks them out of it by saying that her powers are part of her and that they are her gift. She insists that she only needs to channel it the right way and use it to protect the town. The two eventually agree with Regina and as they decide to search again for their daughter, they notice that the locator spell and Emma's scarf missing. Then, they also notice that Elsa is gone.

Meanwhile, Robin takes it upon himself to help Regina find the book's origins, so he steals the storybook and pays a visit to Granny's, where he sees Will pouring his "Lunch and Dinner" (from a liquor flask) and asks for his help. Will tells Robin about how the events played out in Storybrooke until Emma's arrival and points to the place where it began. The two stop by the library, where after searching through several books, Robin notices a page falling out of his bag. He then calls Regina, who while helping the others find Emma was talking to Mary Margaret about the difference between being a hero and a villain. Regina was comforted by Mary Margret who insisted that neither one of them was all good or all evil. As Regina leaves to meet Robin, Mary Margret tells her that happy endings are hard to come by, but that she can have one if she is willing to fight for it.

At the same time, Hook arrives at the mansion to warn Emma, but Gold thwarts his efforts, erases his phone calls to Emma, and ties him to the fence. Inside the mansion, Elsa finds Emma, whose powers are destroying the room they are in, and tells her that she sees her doing the same thing that she once did, blaming herself for not being able to control her powers because her family was harmed and that she should be blessed to have this gift. Elsa then asks Emma for her hand and she takes it, resulting in Emma's powers returning to normal. Outside, Gold, upset over what he just saw, becomes furious over his failed attempt to take Emma's power, which pleased Hook. However, Gold says that despite the setback, he will find a way to acquire the power to free him from the Dark One's Dagger. But Gold also needs another item: the heart of someone who knew Gold before he became the Dark One. Since Killian is the only one left alive, Gold takes his heart. By doing so, Gold makes Killian his puppet and vows to use him to find another way to get Emma's powers, before he will kill him. As Hook reunites with Emma and kisses her, Emma wondered what got into him, and after she and Elsa walk away, he grabs the Sorcerer's box and hides it inside the jacket. Regina arrives at the library, where Robin shows her a page that featured the two together at the pub back in the Enchanted Forest, leading to indications that whoever wrote the story wanted them to be together. Back at the Snow Queen's lair, Ingrid, now free of the force field, follows through with her plan to bring her three sisters together by sending out her ribbons to Emma and Elsa. As Emma and Elsa are reunited with David, Mary Margaret, and Henry, she unleashed her magic into the sky, which creates colorful auroras and then fireworks. Unfortunately, Emma and Elsa notice the yellow ribbons on their left wrists too late, and that they can't remove their ribbons, even while the ribbons are siphoning away their powers.

Finally, Gold shows up to confront Ingrid, blaming her for ruining his plan, but Ingrid says it that was Elsa who interfered, remarking that they were "like sisters." Gold vows that he'll make Ingrid pay, but now that the Snow Queen has harnessed Emma and Elsa's powers after she placed the ribbons on their wrists, she claims that she has become much more powerful, possibly even powerful enough to defeat Mr. Gold and decorate her palace "with his bones." When she wonders whether she should give it a try, Mr. Gold warns her not to overestimate her powers, but Ingrid warns Mr. Gold not to underestimate her powers, in response. Then, the Snow Queen smiles with delight while using her new-found powers to cast the Spell of Shattered Sight over Storybrooke, which shatters her mirror in the process.

== Reception ==
=== Ratings ===
The two-hour outing posted a 2.4/6 rating among 18-49s, with 6.8 million viewers tuning in, down a tenth from the previous airing. The Canadian broadcast was watched by 1.86 million viewers, making it the second highest-rated telecast of the night and the fifteenth of the week.

=== Reviews ===
The episodes received positive reviews from critics, mostly due to the fast-paced storyline.

In a review from Entertainment Weekly, Hilary Busis asks a "Serious question: Is a Storybrooke in which everyone's suspicious, caustic, and attacking the people around them really going to be that different from the town's general status quo? (At least, as long as Grumpy is around?) We'll have to wait two long weeks for the answer to that burning (freezing?) question, thanks to the American Music Awards. At least Once prepared for its off week by giving us both halves of a two-parter—a story that, when all is said and done, maybe didn't need to be told over the course of two hours, though it was nice to see the show take some time to privilege character over plot tonight. The hour also revealed the answers to a few of the season's long-simmering unsolved mysteries—including how Elsa ended up trapped within the anti-magic urn. Could this indicate the end of the Arendelle fairybacks, considering that backstory seems to be fairly complete at this point? If it does, will you miss them—or are you looking forward to the show not spending quite so much time on the Frozen crew?"

Amy Ratcliffe of IGN rated the episodes 8.6 out of 10, saying "Overall, tonight's super serving of Once Upon a Time covered a lot of ground with forward plot movement and character development. It stands as a good example of how to structure a two hour episode except for the fact that the primary plot could have been stronger. The Snow Queen's backstory was filled out even more, and it's easy to trace the path from point A to point villain. Mitchell was particularly excellent in Ingrid's lack of shoes tonight, and I hope the story can overcome the fact that someone is casting the bajillionth spell on Storybrooke."

TV Fanatic gave the episodes 4.6 out of 5 stars.

Gwen Inhat of The A.V. Club gave the episodes a B.
