= Michael Scott Rohan =

Scottish writer

- Born: 22 January 1951; Edinburgh, Scotland
- Died: 12 August 2018 (aged 67)
- Education: St Edmund Hall, Oxford University
- Occupation: Writer
- Spouse: Deborah Rohan

Michael Scott Rohan (22 January 1951 – 12 August 2018) was a Scottish fantasy and science fiction author and writer on opera.

He had a number of short stories published before his first books, the science fiction novel Run to the Stars and the non-fiction First Byte. He then collaborated with Allan J. Scott on the nonfiction The Hammer and The Cross (an account of Christianity arriving in Viking lands, not to be confused with Harry Harrison's similarly themed novel trilogy of the same name) and the fantasy novels The Ice King and A Spell of Empire.

Rohan is best known for the trilogy The Winter of the World, set in the Ice Age. He also wrote the Spiral novels, in which our world is the Hub, or Core, of a spiral of mythic and legendary versions of familiar cities, countries and continents.

In the "Author's Note" to The Lord of Middle Air, Rohan asserted that he and Walter Scott have a common ancestor in Michael Scot, who is a character in the novel.

According to his entry on the website of the Little, Brown Book Group, "after many years in Oxford and Yorkshire (they moved to Leeds in 1984), he and his American wife Deborah (Archives Conservator for Cambridgeshire) lived (as of 1994) in a small village near Cambridge, next to the pub."

== Family origins ==
His father was of French origin, born on Mauritius but educated in France, and later studied at the University of Edinburgh. During World War II he joined the British Army. His mother came from the Borders.

== Early life ==
Rohan was born in 1951 in Edinburgh, in, apparently, the house next door to that of the author Robert Louis Stevenson. He was educated at the Edinburgh Academy and St Edmund Hall, Oxford University where, having initially planned to study English, changed to study law. It was during his time as a student that he joined the Science Fiction group. Here he met the Group's president, Allan Scott, who would later become his co-author of several books. He also met his future wife, Philadelphia native and Stanford post-graduate Deborah, through the Group. The couple married in 1977.

== Professional life and writing ==
He asserted that during his time studying, and after, he held various casual jobs, including "librarian, software technical writer, editor, translator, and shipping rare botanical specimens around the world". Achieving his Masters in 1973, Rohan left the legal field and went to work for an international publishing firm editing encyclopedias. This job he held for five years, until taking voluntary redundancy in 1978. It was at this point he began writing some of the works for which he is now best known – The Hammer and the Cross and Run to the Stars.

== Illness ==
Rohan was diagnosed with an incurable illness in 2000, and after that, stopped writing fiction. He died in Edinburgh on 12 August 2018, aged 67.

== Interests ==
Rohan "from an early age ... read voraciously, everything from Dan Dare to the Larousse Mythology, Conan Doyle, C. S. Lewis (Out of the Silent Planet, not Narnia), Tolkien, and his older sister's copy of Lady Chatterley". He had interests in anthropology, history, archaeology (which had extended to participating in excavations), and palaeontology, but also cinema, hifi, and home entertainment. He was for two years a columnist for the London Times, and also at one time "a music journalist, a columnist and reviewer for Music Magazine and Opera Now in its first two years", and a regular contributor to "Classic CD, International Opera Collector, and others, as well as creating and editing The Classical Video Guide (1994)". As of 2011, he was still contributing to opera publications.

He enjoyed classical music and cited amongst his favourite composers Richard Wagner (and rated himself an authority on opera), Mozart, Sibelius, Mussorgsky, and Rimsky-Korsakov.

He spoke French and German, and a little Finnish and was trying to learn Russian.

He briefly played guitar and sang in a folk-rock band.

He and his wife enjoyed archery and shared "a strong interest in wildlife conservation", particularly singling out the Durrell Wildlife Conservation Trust.

== Bibliography ==
=== The Winter of the World ===
- The Anvil of Ice (1986) (illustrated by Anne Yvonne Gilbert in 1989)
- The Forge in the Forest (1987) (illustrated by Anne Yvonne Gilbert in 1989)
- The Hammer of the Sun (1988) (illustrated by Anne Yvonne Gilbert in 1989)
- The Castle of the Winds (1998)
- The Singer and the Sea (1999)
- Shadow of the Seer (2001)

=== The Spiral ===
- Chase the Morning (1990)
- The Gates of Noon (1992)
- Cloud Castles (1993)
- Maxie's Demon (1997)

=== Other works ===
- Run to the Stars (1982)
- First Byte (1983)
- The Lord of Middle Air (1994)

=== With Allan J. Scott ===
- The Hammer and the Cross (1980) (nonfiction)
- Fantastic People: Magical Races of Myth and Legend (1980)
- The Ice King (1983)
- A Spell of Empire (1992)

Some of his works have been translated to other languages, including German (The Spiral series).
