= Snow Queen =

Snow Queen may refer to:

- The Snow Queen, an 1844 fairy tale by Hans Christian Andersen
- Snow queen or Synthyris reniformis, a species of flowering plant

== Adaptations of the Andersen fairy tale ==
=== Film ===
- The Snow Queen (1957 film), USSR animation
- The Snow Queen (1967 film), USSR fantasy
- The Snow Queen (1986 film), Finland
- The Snow Queen (1995 film), UK animation
- Snow Queen (2002 film), US fantasy
- The Snow Queen (2005 film), BBC TV
- The Snow Queen (2012 film), Russian animation

=== Television ===
- The Snow Queen (Japanese TV series), Japan, 2005
- The Snow Queen (South Korean TV series), South Korea, 2006
- "The Snow Queen" (Faerie Tale Theatre), a 1985 episode
- "The Snow Queen" (Once Upon a Time), a 2014 episode

=== Other adaptations ===
- The Snow Queen (Kernaghan novel), a 2000 speculative fiction novel
- The Snow Queen (Vinge novel), a 1980 science fiction novel by Joan D. Vinge
- The Snow Queen (Lackey novel), a 2008 novel by Mercedes Lackey
- The Snow Queen (King), a 1992 chamber opera
- The Snow Queen (Abrahamsen), a 2019 opera
- The Snow Queen (video game), 1985
- Die Schneekönigin, 2015 opera by George Alexander Albrecht

== Other uses ==
- Snow Queen Trophy, a slalom race of the Alpine skiing World Cup held in Zagreb, Croatia
- Kylie Christmas: Snow Queen Edition, a Christmas album by Kylie Minogue
- "Snow Queen," B-side of Elton John's "Don't Go Breaking My Heart"
- "Snow Queen," B-side of Roger Nichols Trio, Love Song, Love Song (1967)
- Snow Queen, a role in the ballet The Nutcracker
- Snow queen (slang), a gay black or Hispanic man who prefers Caucasian men

== See also ==
- Elsa (Frozen), a fictional character in the Frozen franchise
- White Witch, a fictional character in the novel series The Chronicles of Narnia
- Ice Queen (disambiguation)
