= Ice King (disambiguation) =

Ice King is a character in the TV series Adventure Time.

Ice King may also refer to:

- The Ice King (novel), a 1983 novel by Michael Scott Rohan and Allan Scott
- Charles W. Morse, an American businessman nicknamed "Ice King"
- Frederic Tudor, an American businessman nicknamed "Ice King"
- USS Ice King a refrigerated cargo ship during World War I
- The Ice King, a character from the seventh season of Fortnite: Battle Royale

== See also ==
- Ice Kings, a 2006 documentary
- Ice Kings (football)
- The Ice Emperor, a character in Ninjago
