= Jennifer Roberson =

American author of fantasy and historical literature

- Born: Jennifer Mitchell Roberson; October 26, 1953 (age 73); Kansas City, Missouri, U.S.
- Education: Northern Arizona University (BS)
- Occupation: Author
- Writing career
- Language: English
- Genres: Historical fiction Fantasy

Jennifer Mitchell Roberson (born October 26, 1953) is an American author of fantasy and historical literature.

== Personal life ==
Roberson has lived in Arizona since 1957. Though she grew up in Phoenix, the author lived in Flagstaff for 12 years, and now resides in Tucson. Roberson obtained a Bachelor of Science degree in journalism from Northern Arizona University in 1982 as an adult student. She spent her final semester in England at the University of London, which enabled her to do in-depth research at castles and cathedrals, museums and estates, and to visit historical sites in Scotland and Wales. She breeds and exhibits Cardigan Welsh Corgis under the CHEYSULI kennel prefix, and creates mosaic artwork as hobbies.

== Bibliography ==
=== Chronicles of the Cheysuli ===
- Vol. 1: Shapechangers (1984)

This is the story of the Cheysuli, shapechangers who have been hunted through their homeland, Homana, for over twenty years. Now, Alix, a girl who is being courted by the Crown Prince of Homana, learns that she is Cheysuli. Just as this happens however, Homana is invaded by the neighboring country of Solinde and the island country of Atvia. Both the Cheysuli and the prince are driven into a long exile.

- Vol. 2: The Song of Homana (1985)

The Song of Homana is the story of the Crown Prince of Homana, Carillon, returning from exile to retake Homana. He is seduced by Electra, his enemy's daughter and Tynstar's mistress. Tynstar is the ruler of the sorcerous Ihlini, who are mortal enemies of the Cheysuli.

- Vol. 3: Legacy of the Sword (1986)

This novel is about Donal, Alix's son and Carillon's heir. He must fight off Tynstar's son, Strahan, while Homana is attacked once more by Solinde and Atvia. During this time, he marries Aislinn, Carillon and Electra's daughter.

- Vol. 4: Track of the White Wolf (1987)

This volume is about the part Cheysuli and part Homanan Niall, the son of Donal and Aislinn. He has no shapechanging ability and is sent off to Atvia with his liege man. On the way, however, he is captured by the prince of Erinn and is forced to escape. At Atvia he meets his betrothed, the mad Gisela. He marries her and returns to Homana, only to find that both Cheysuli and Homanans want him dead. This, a rebellion in Solinde—now a country occupied by Homana—and a plague force Niall to embrace his shapechanger side and try to kill Strahan.

- Vol. 5: A Pride of Princes (1988)

This volume covers the adventures of Niall's three sons: Brennan, Prince of Homana; Hart, Prince of Solinde; and Corin, Prince of Atvia. After a disastrous tavern fight, Brennan must marry an Erinnish Princess, Hart must leave and rule Solinde, and Corin must go to Atvia. Eventually, Corin falls in love with Brennan's bride, Hart loses a hand, and Brennan is seduced by an Ihlini. They all are brought to Strahan and only barely escape with their lives, becoming men in the process.

- Vol. 6: Daughter of the Lion (1989)

Daughter of the Lion is the story of Keely, Niall's legitimate daughter and twin sister to Corin of Atvia. She has strong ideas about women being considered property and how she would not be. Eventually, she incites problems around the palace and leaves for a while. On the way to Clankeep, home of the Cheysuli, where her power to become any animal is praised, she encounters bandits and first meets Rory Redbeard, an Erinnishman. They fall in love, but keep it secret as she is betrothed to Rory's brother, Sean. Eventually, Strahan captures Keely and Taliesin, an Ihlini who does not worship the dark god. Keely is impregnated and only escapes when Taliesin sacrifices himself. Keely manages to kill Strahan and kill her unwanted baby. Eventually, she finds that Rory was really Sean, and she marries him.

- Vol. 7: Flight of the Raven (1990)

This book is about Aidan, the son of Brennan. He is slightly insane, seeing the Lion of Homana as a beast trying to kill him and the chain of rulers being broken in him. He goes on an adventure through his uncle's lands to find a wife, eventually deciding on Shona, Keely's daughter. They get married and Shona is heavily pregnant when Lochiel, Strahan's son, attacks Clankeep. Shona is slain and Aidan is knocked out, but Shona's child is saved and taken by Lochiel. Aidan recovers and goes to find his son, confronting Lochiel and taking his son, Kellin, back. He then decides to renounce his claim to the throne and become a shar'tal, a Cheysuli priest.

- Vol. 8: A Tapestry of Lions (1992)

==== Omnibus editions ====
- Vol. 1+2: Shapechanger's Song (2001)
- Vol. 3+4: Legacy of the Wolf (2001)
- Vol. 5+6: Children of the Lion (2001)
- Vol. 7+8: The Lion Throne (2001)

=== Sword-Dancer Saga ===
- Vol. 1: Sword-Dancer (1986)

Sword-Dancer is the story of Sandtiger, a famous Southron sword-dancer, who is hired by a Northern woman to guide her through the fierce desert to rescue her brother, a slave in the South. This woman, Delilah, or Del is a sword-singer who is as good as Tiger, and this grates on Tiger's Southron ideas.

- Vol. 2: Sword-Singer (1988)

Sword-singer is about Tiger and Del traveling to the North because Del has been charged with the murder of her teacher, who she needed to kill to 'blood' her blade and then 'key' it, or awaken its magical properties.

- Vol. 3: Sword-Maker (1989)

In Sword-Maker, Tiger is tasked to stop an evil sorcerer from tormenting a small Northern village and Del finally faces the man who murdered her family when she was a child. Meanwhile, the two attempt to stop a southern tribal "holy war".

- Vol. 4: Sword-Breaker (1991)

In Sword-Breaker, Tiger and Del, are accused of murdering a man that the Southron tribes believe to be their messiah, but who is actually the murderer of Del's family, Tiger and Del flee across the Punja desert, hunted by religious zealots and sword-dancer assassins. They face many challenges including evading assassins. For Tiger's sword, Samiel, has been possessed by the spirit of the deadly sorcerer, Chosa Dei—a legendary wizard who seeks to mold Tiger into his weapon of destruction. Tiger and Del need to find and gain the help of Chosa Dei's equally powerful counterpart and sworn enemy, Shaka Obre, who has not been seen in the world for hundreds of years.

- Vol. 5: Sword-Born (1998)

Exiled from both the North and the South, Southron sword-dancer Tiger and Northern sword-singer Del have set sail to search for Tiger's homeland. But no journey is ever without complications for Tiger and Del. Shipwrecked, nearly drowned, abducted by pirates, and bedeviled by magic and those who would use the pair to their own ends, the two finally do arrive at their destination. But before their quest is over, Tiger must face a truth about himself which may prove more dangerous than any sword-dance.

- Vol. 6: Sword-Sworn (2002)

Having freed himself from the stone forests of Skandi, Tiger and Del return to the South. They originally fled the South because, to save Del's life, Tiger broke his vows as a seventh level sword-dancer, declaring himself elaii-ali-ma. Every sword-dancer in the South, even ones he once considered his friends, are now bound to kill him. They don't even have to invite him into the circle, where sword-dances are usually conducted, they can execute him any way they deem the simplest. Tiger returns to this land, originally, because the South is his home and he hopes to rebuild the shodo at Alimat, where he was trained. Soon he is haunted by dreams, dreams of a skeleton, of a woman's voice that commands him -- "Find me," she says, "And take up the sword."

- Vol. 7: Sword-Bound (2013)

For the first time in years, life is settled for Tiger and Del. Occasionally, Tiger must fight sword-dancers who want to kill him for forsaking the oaths and vows of the circle. For the most part it is a peaceful life until Tiger's twenty-five-year-old son accuses him of being “domesticated.” Challenged by his son to reclaim his status, Tiger, accompanied by Del and his son, travels northward, which tests his sword skill and resolve and leads him and Del to encounter an old enemy.

- Vol. 8: Sword-Bearer (2022)

With the world around them falling victim to a malignant Northern-born magic, Tiger gathers Del and his adult son, Neesha, to end the magic threatening the world — and discovers, along the journey, yet another element of magecraft within himself. Yet even as Tiger learns more about his gifts, Del comes face to face with the daughter she left behind so many years before.

==== Omnibus editions ====
- Vol. 1+2: The Novels of Tiger and Del, Volume I (2006)
- Vol. 3+4: The Novels of Tiger and Del, Volume II (2006)
- Vol. 5+6: The Novels of Tiger and Del, Volume III (2007)

=== Robin Hood/Marian ===
- Vol. 1: Lady of the Forest (1992)
- Vol. 2: Lady of Sherwood (1999)

=== Karavans ===
- Vol. 1: Karavans (2006)
- Vol. 2: Deepwood (2007)
- Vol. 3: The Wild Road (2012)
- Vol. 4: Dragon Moon upcoming

=== Stand-Alone ===
- Smoketree (1985)
- Kansas Blood (1986) (as Jay Mitchell)
- The Irishman (originally Royal Captive 1986 as Jennifer O'Green)
- Lady of the Glen (1996)
- The Golden Key (1996) (with Melanie Rawn and Kate Elliott)
- Highlander: Scotland the Brave (1996)

=== Anthologies ===
- Return to Avalon (1996) (with Martin H. Greenberg)
- Highwaymen: Robbers and Rogues (1997) (with Liz Danforth)
- Out of Avalon (2001) (with Martin H. Greenberg)
