= The Ice King (novel) =

Novel by Michael Scott Rohan and Allan Scott

The Ice King is a horror and fantasy novel by Michael Scott Rohan and Allan Scott published in 1983.

== Plot summary ==
The Ice King is a novel in which archaeologists uncover an ancient evil from the Viking era.

== Reception ==
Dave Langford reviewed The Ice King for White Dwarf #78, and stated that "the appalling Ice King is not (in the last analysis) wholly unsympathetic. Good rousing stuff".

== Reviews ==
- Chris Morgan (1986) in Fantasy Review, March 1986
- Barbara Davies (1986) in Vector 132
- Ken Brown (1987) in Interzone, #21 Autumn 1987
- Andy Sawyer (1987) in Paperback Inferno, #65
