= The Forge in the Forest =

1987 novel by Michael Scott Rohan

The Forge in the Forest is a novel by Michael Scott Rohan published in 1987.

== Plot summary ==
The Forge in the Forest is a novel in which a perilous journey is part of the struggle against the Ice which threatens what is left of civilization. This is the second part of the Winter of the World saga.

== Reception ==
Dave Langford reviewed The Forge in the Forest for White Dwarf #88, and stated that "parts of which I found myself skipping, only to enjoy the vivid highlights of battle, smithcraft [...] and above all the Power and geography of the inhospitable Ice."

== Reviews ==
- Valerie Housden (1987) in Vector 138
- Pauline Morgan (1987) in Fantasy Review, June 1987
- Ken Brown (1987) in Interzone, #21 Autumn 1987
- Laurence Scotford (1988) in Paperback Inferno, #73
- Mike Chinn (1990) in The British Fantasy Newsletter, Winter 1989-1990
