= Roland Harvey =

Australian children's illustrator and author

- Born: Roland Bruce Harvey; 1 December 1945 (age 80); Melbourne, Victoria, Australia
- Occupations: Illustrator, author
- Writing career
- Years active: 1981–present
- Genre: Children's literature

Roland Bruce Harvey (born 11 December 1945) is an Australian children's illustrator, and author. He is best known as an illustrator of children's books using pen, ink, and watercolour, and is the founder owner of Five Mile Press.

== Early life ==
Roland Harvey was born on 11 December 1945 in Melbourne, Victoria.

== Career ==
His works have been described as showing a "witty slapstick style" with "characteristic humorous and detailed illustrations".

A former architect, Harvey established Roland Harvey Studios, an illustration and design firm, in 1978.

In 1981 he expanded his business by establishing his own book publishing company, Five Mile Press. His children's book division, Roland Harvey Books, aims to publish books that raise awareness of issues and ideas as well as entertain readers.

Harvey has written picture books and humorous historical works for young children.

== Recognition, honours and awards ==
- 1989?: Children's Book Council of Australia Book of the Year Awards (CBCA Book of the Year Awards), My Place in Space, named an Honour Book; and The Friends of Emily Culpepper commended
- 1986: Shortlisted, CBCA Book of the Year Awards, for Burke and Wills
- 1986 Winner, Clifton Pugh Award for illustration,Burke and Wills
- 1999: Winner, 1999 Wilderness Society Environment Award, Islands in My Garden
- 2001: Shortlisted, New South Wales Premier's Literary Awards, Sick As: Bloody Moments in the History of Medicine
- 2001: Shortlisted, CBCA Eve Pownall Award for Information Books
- 2005: Dromkeen Medal
- 2012: Shortlisted in the Speech Pathology Australia Book of the Year Awards, Best Language Development Book for Young Children, The Little Dragon
- 2017: CBCA Book of the Year Awards, Children's Picture Books notable book, On the River

== List of works ==
=== Children's stories ===
1. Eureka Stockade (1981) Author: Alan Boardman
2. The First Fleet (1982) Author: Alan Boardman
3. The Friends of Emily Culpepper (1983) Author: Ann Coleridge
4. Burke and Wills (1985) Author: David Greagg
5. My Place in Space (1988) with Joe Levine. Authors: Robin and Sally Hirst
6. Milly Fitzwilly's Mousecatcher (1991) Author: Marcia Vaughan
7. Islands in My Garden (1998) Author: Jim Howes
8. Sick As - Bloody Moments in the History of Medicine (2000)
9. At the Beach: Postcards from Crabby Spit (2004)
10. In the Bush : Our Holiday at Wombat Flat (2005)
11. In the City : Our Scrapbook of Souvenirs (2007)
12. Belvedere Dreaming (2002) Author: Kate Ryan
13. Belvedere in the City (2002) Author: Kate Ryan
14. Belvedere Is Beached (2002) Author: Kate Ryan
15. Climbing Mount Sugarbin: Aussie Bites (2003)
16. Islands in my Garden (2002)
17. The Secret Record of Me (2007)
18. Roland Harvey's Big Book of Christmas (2008)
19. Saving Mr Pinto (2008) Author: Alison Lester
20. The Shadow Brumby (2007) Author: Alison Lester
21. Circus Pony (2007) Author: Alison Lester
22. Racing the Tide (2007) Author: Alison Lester
23. In the City: Our Scrapbook of Souvenirs (2008)
24. To the Top End: Our trip across Australia (2009)
25. All the Way to W.A.: Our Search for Uncle Kev (2019)
