= Moon Mirror =

Book of stories by Andre Norton

- Cover of the first edition
- Author: Andre Norton
- Illustrator: Anne Yvonne Gilbert
- Cover artist: Anne Yvonne Gilbert
- Language: English
- Genre: Fantasy short stories
- Publisher: Tor Books
- Publication date: 1988
- Publication place: United States
- Media type: Print (hardcover)
- Pages: 199 pp.
- ISBN: 0-312-93098-4

Moon Mirror is a collection of short stories by science fiction and fantasy author Andre Norton, and illustrator Anne Yvonne Gilbert. It was first published in hardcover by Tor Books in December 1988, and reprinted in paperback by the same publisher in August 1989 and August 1994.

The book collects nine short stories, novelettes and novellas by Norton.

== Contents ==
- "How Many Miles to Babylon?" (original to the collection)
- "The Toymaker's Snuffbox" (from Golden Magazine for Boys and Girls, August 1966)
- "Teddi" (from Science Fiction Adventures from Way Out, edited by Roger Elwood, 1973)
- "Desirable Lakeside Residence" (from Saving Worlds, edited by Roger Elwood and Virginia Kidd, 1973)
- "The Long Night of Waiting" (from Long Night of Waiting and Other Stories, edited by Roger Elwood, 1974)
- "Through the Needle's Eye" (from High Sorcery, by Andre Norton, 1970)
- "One Spell Wizard" (from Garan the Eternal, by Andre Norton, 1972)
- "Outside" (from Outside, by Andre Norton, 1975)
- "Moon Mirror" (from Hecate's Cauldron, edited by Susan M. Shwartz, 1982)
