= Lady of the Forest =

Book by Jennifer Roberson

- First edition cover
- Author: Jennifer Roberson
- Illustrator: Anne Yvonne Gilbert
- Cover artist: Anne Yvonne Gilbert
- Language: English
- Genre: Historical fiction Romance
- Publisher: Zebra Books
- Publication date: September 1992
- Publication place: United States
- Pages: 593
- ISBN: 0-8217-3919-0
- OCLC: 646570599
- Followed by: Lady of Sherwood

Lady of the Forest: A Novel of Sherwood is a 1992 historical fiction novel by American author Jennifer Roberson. A re-telling of the Robin Hood legend from the perspective of twelve characters associated with the legend, the story centers around English noblewoman Lady Marian FitzWalter's encounters with Lord Robert of Locksley and his scheming rival the Sheriff of Nottingham amid the backdrop of Prince John's schemes – he aims to increase his own wealth and power at the expense of post-Conquest England and his brother, King Richard.

Roberson wrote her novel as a prequel to the known legend. Understanding that Robin Hood lacked a single origin story, she decided to create an original narrative that depicted how "seven very different people from a rigidly stratified social structure came to join together to fight the inequities of medieval England." Roberson spent a year researching and writing the story, and sought to combine fact and legend in developing the motivations for certain characters.

The novel was published in September 1992 by Zebra Books, with a cover designed by illustrator Anne Yvonne Gilbert. Lady of the Forest received generally positive reviews, and has been analyzed by Robin Hood scholar Stephen Thomas Knight, who observed that Roberson's Marian is a "strong woman" who helps Robert, a traumatized veteran of the Crusades, adjust to his life in England; Knight connects this to the "post-Vietnam" mood that existed when the novel was written. Roberson released a sequel, Lady of Sherwood, in 1999.

== Plot summary ==
In the spring of 1194 in the English county of Nottinghamshire, Lady Marian FitzWalter attends a festival held at Huntington Castle by the Earl of Huntington, who wishes to honour the return of his only surviving heir, Lord Robert of Locksley, from the Crusades. Marian seeks an audience with Robert to learn the manner of her Crusader father's death the previous year, as Robert was a witness. The reserved, mentally scarred Robert reacts strongly, having flashbacks to Sir Hugh's violent murder at the hands of Saracens. He informs her that Hugh wished for Marian to marry William DeLacey, the harsh and scheming Sheriff of Nottingham, to her dismay. DeLacey knows naught of her father's last wishes, but intends to make her marry him anyway.

Prince John arrives at the festival unexpectedly with plans: he states his wish to ally himself with the Earl by marrying Robert to his bastard daughter Joanna, and also approaches DeLacey about raising more taxes ostensibly to be sent to ransom John's brother, King Richard. In truth, John wishes to keep the revenue for himself and maintain his brother's imprisonment.

Soon after, Marian is reluctantly manipulated into accompanying the Sheriff to attend a market at Nottingham Castle. There, she is kidnapped by the prisoner William "Scarlet" Scathlocke, an enraged man imprisoned for killing four Norman soldiers, and is taken into the depths of nearby Sherwood Forest. Lord Robert, who was taught how to navigate the massive forest as a youth, secretly tracks Scarlet and is able to secure Marian's release. While accompanying Marian back to her modest manor, Ravenskeep, Robert falls ill from a fever. Marian gradually wears down the mental wall he had built up in captivity by the Saracens, and after his recovery at Ravenskeep, they consummate their relationship soon after she refuses DeLacey's offer of marriage.

Robert returns to Huntington, along the way besting outlaws such as Adam Bell and Will Scarlet at a contest of archery. He encounters his father and several other prominent noblemen, and is told they wish for him to marry Joanna to mislead Prince John about their intentions to thwart his grabs for power. Robert refuses. Meanwhile, Marian barely avoids being forced to marry DeLacey, and only escapes with the help of the kind Friar Tuck and the Sheriff's seneschal Guy de Gisbourne, who is infatuated with her. She flees to Huntington Castle; the Earl is displeased with his son's disobedience and their liaison, causing Marian and Robert to travel to the small village of Locksley, his namesake and holding.

Robert endeavours to steal the funds needed for King Richard's ransom, and begins robbing the rich with the help of Sherwood's outlaws, whom he has gradually befriended. At the same time, Eleanor of Aquitaine, Richard's mother, is working to raise the ransom through more legal methods: by taxing clergy and laymen for a quarter of the value of their property, confiscating the gold and silver treasures of the churches, and imposing scutage and carucage taxes. Back in the small village of Locksley, Marian is captured and sent to the Sheriff's dungeon, where she is given an ultimatum: marry DeLacey or find herself charged with witchcraft. She is rescued by Robert, who arrives with his friends to free her. Just as they are about to be arrested by a wrathful Prince John, whose money has been stolen by the outlaws, King Richard arrives unexpectedly, allowing Robert and his associates to escape.

== Development ==
American author Jennifer Roberson was known for writing fantasy novels before she moved into historical fiction, a genre new to her. She noted, "One thing I'd always wanted to try –another ‘someday’ dream – was a big, sprawling, mainstream historical epic." She proposed to her literary agent that she write a reinterpretation of the Robin Hood legend from the perspective of Maid Marian. Roberson understood that her rendition was not a "recounting" of the original story, because "there is none"; rather, Lady of the Forest was "purely [her] own concoction." Describing the novel as a prequel, the author explained, "I wanted very much to write the story of how the legend came to be; the tale of how seven very different people from a rigidly stratified social structure came to join together to fight the inequities of medieval England. To me, the key was logic—I interwove historical fact with the fantasy of the classic legend, and developed my own interpretation of how things came to be. I wanted to come to know all of these people; to climb inside their heads and learn what motivated them to do what they did."

It took Roberson a year to research and write the novel. She credited as resource materials J. C. Holt's Robin Hood, Maurice Keen's The Outlaws of Sherwood, The Ballads of Robin Hood, Elizabeth Hallam's The Plantagenet Chronicles, W. L. Warren's King John, as well as the works of Frances and Joseph Gies. In a 2007 interview, Roberson stated that writing the story was "extremely challenging" because she employs the viewpoints of twelve main characters – Marian, Lord Robert, DeLacey, Sir Guy de Gisbourne, the Earl of Huntington, Eleanor DeLacey (the Sheriff's plain, scheming daughter), Friar Tuck, Will Scarlet, the minstrel Alan of the Dales (whom becomes an outlaw after being falsely accused of rape), the simple boy Much, the moneylender Abraham the Jew (who Robert uses to raise money for the ransom), and the shepherd turned reluctant outlaw Little John. Roberson believed that this experience made her a better writer.

Roberson has spoken of the difficulties of writing medieval women, particularly because so many contemporary authors are accused of giving their characters "anachronistic independence of thought and feminist leanings." The author acknowledged that with Eleanor DeLacey, an invented character, she "tread[s] close to the boundaries" but believes Eleanor is a reflection of women of "loose morals", who indeed existed in the 1190s. Roberson continued, "I choose to believe an Eleanor might well have looked to sexual dalliance as a means of seeking freedom of choice in an age when women had very little." Conversely, Marian, Roberson wrote, "is a truer product of her times, shaped by the ordinary responsibilities and expectations of a medieval woman." Marian only gains the strength and freedom to love after the loss of her good reputation as a captive in Sherwood Forest.

== Analysis ==
Stephen Thomas Knight, a scholar on Robin Hood, has written extensively on Roberson's "interesting" perspective of the legend. According to him, Lady of the Forest was another in a long line of contemporary stories that has elevated Marian to "hero status". He connects this to a corresponding "weakening" of Robin in Roberson's story, noting that there is a relationship between the novel's "post-Vietnam" date and its story, with Robin rendered as a "battleweary veteran returning from the Crusades" in a "traumatized state." Knight continues that "it is evident that Roberson is using the post-Vietnam mood as the basis for her weakening of Robin to permit a 'strong woman' presentation of Marion." Roberson's Marian is made "an independent and intelligent woman who helps Lord Robin, traumatised by the crusades, re-establish himself both as a man and a leader of resistance."

In an article published in the Journal of Gender Studies, Jane Tolmie stated that Lady of the Forest was another in a long line of contemporary fantasy novels that depicted women having to endure acts of rape, violence, and oppression as "aspects of a continuum rather than as isolated difficulties" – Marian for instance is subjected to abductions and attempted forced marriage. Tolmie added that in the context of Roberson's book, Marian is praised as "extraordinary" only within the "oppressive, gender-based" criteria promoted by the patriarchal Norman society. After Marian wields a quarterstaff to attack another, Robert compares the lady to a man, namely her father – both "had met adversity with the same determination, the same intensity."

== Release and reception ==
Lady of the Forest was published in September 1992 by New York City-based Zebra Books, with cover art by Anne Yvonne Gilbert. A Japanese translation was released in 1994, while a German edition was published in 2003. Roberson stated in a March 2007 interview that "various options" had been taken for adapting the book but added that this was true of many other works. In 1999, she followed the novel with the sequel Lady of Sherwood, which depicts the effects of King Richard's death: the outlaws are persecuted anew by the Sheriff, while the Earl works against John in favor of Arthur of Brittany.

Lady of the Forest has received generally positive reviews, with Stephen Knight deeming it a "highly effective novel." The Library Journal lauded Roberson for thoroughly researching the story and yet not overwhelming readers with facts, and predicted the book would be popular in the wake of the 1991 feature film Robin Hood: Prince of Thieves. The Journal continued that the author's "personal touches create a delightful historical novel with traditional romantic overtones. The writing is so colorful and active that it is difficult to put the book down."

Publishers Weekly praised the novel for its "lively storytelling and pacing", which helped make it "an enjoyable, almost creditable recasting of the Robin Hood legend as historical fiction." The book's romance, the reviewer added, "works beautifully, capturing in the tale of Robin and Marian the terrifying bliss of first love. A diverting, delightful book from a most promising talent." However, Publishers Weekly included some criticisms, opining that Robert of Locksley and Marian "are unlikely to have been as naive as Roberson depicts them."

== See also ==
- List of historical novels
- Robin Hood in popular culture
