= The Anvil of Ice =

1986 novel by Michael Scott Rohan

The Anvil of Ice is a novel by Michael Scott Rohan published in 1986.

== Plot summary ==
This is the first part of the Winter of the World saga, telling the story of the life and heroic deeds of the young Alva-Elof, referring to Old Scandinavian mythology. The Anvil of Ice is a novel in which Alv survives an attack on his town and becomes an apprentice blacksmith crafting enchanted weapons.

== Reception ==
Dave Langford reviewed The Anvil of Ice for White Dwarf #79, and stated that "Rohan clears the major hurdle of a trilogy opening: he actually makes me want to read book two! Stay tuned."

The book also received other reviews by:

- Brian Stableford (1986) in Fantasy Review, May 1986
- Barbara Davies (1986) in Vector 133
- Don D'Ammassa (1986) in Science Fiction Chronicle, #84 September 1986
- Baird Searles (1987) in Isaac Asimov's Science Fiction Magazine, May 1987
- Denise Gorse (1987) in Paperback Inferno, #66
- Kliatt
