= Dragonology =

Book series

Dragonology is a series of books for children and young adults about dragons, written in a non-fictional style. The series contains information on dragons, including about how to befriend and protect them as well as an alphabet of the dragon language, ancient runes, and replica samples of dragon scales. The series later expanded to include figures, plush toys, models, a strategic board game, a card game, and a video game for the Nintendo DS. Books in the series are credited to fictional authors such as Dr. Ernest Drake, a member of the Secret and Ancient Society of Dragonologists, and the author of the series' first book, Dragonology: The Complete Book of Dragons.

The Dragonology books launched the Ologies book series in 2003. The publishers eventually published books with similar formats and themes on both real and fictional topics such as egyptology, wizardry, pirates, Greek mythology, monsters, dinosaurs, and several others. As of 2025, there are 15 main books in the Ologies series.

In 2008, Universal Pictures acquired the film rights to the Dragonology series and Leonard Hartman was set to write and executive produce the adaptation. Alex Kurtzman and Roberto Orci were attached to produce the film for Universal. In 2018, Paramount Pictures acquired the rights to develop a film franchise based on all Ologies books, including a Dragonology portion of the series. Akiva Goldsman was hired to oversee a writers' room to write scripts for interconnected family films based on the books and supplemental materials, partnering with Weed Road studio colleague Greg Lessans as the film's producers.

== Products ==
The books are published in the United States and Canada by Candlewick Press and in the United Kingdom by Templar Publishing. The games and toys were produced by Sababa Toys.

The releases in the Dragonology series include:

=== Books ===
- Dragonology: The Complete Book of Dragons (2003) by Dr. Ernest Drake, editor Dugald Steer, illustrators Helen Ward, Wayne Anderson, Nghiem Ta, Chris Forsey, A. J. Wood, and Douglas Carrel, ISBN 1-84011-503-3
- The Dragonology Handbook: A Practical Course in Dragons by Dr. Ernest Drake, editor Dugald Steer, ISBN 1-84011-523-8
- Working with Dragons: A Course in Dragonology
- Bringing Up Baby Dragons: A Guide for Beginners
- Dragonology The Coloring Book
- Dragonology The Colouring Companion
- Dragonology Chronicles:
  - The Dragon's Eye
  - The Dragon Diary
  - The Dragon's Apprentice
  - The Dragon Prophecy
- Dragonology Pocket Adventures Collection:
  - The Iceland Wyrm
  - The Dragon Star
  - The Dragon Dance
  - The Winged Serpent

=== Book sets ===
- Obscure Spells and Charms of Dragon Origin: A Dragonology Kit
- Tracking and Taming Dragons Volume 1: European Dragon
- Tracking and Taming Dragons Volume 2: Frost Dragon
- Dragonology: Field Guide to Dragons
- A Dragonology Code Writing Kit
- Drake's Comprehensive Compendium of Dragonology (2009) by Dr. Ernest Drake, editor Dugald Steer, illustrators Nghiem Ta, J.P. Lambert, A. J. Wood, Douglas Carrel, Tomislav Tomic, Nick Harris, Wayne Anderson, and Helen Ward

=== Games and toys ===
- Dragonology: The Game (board game)
- Hatch: The Dragonology Card Game (cards)
- Dragon figures - Series 1 (four figures) and Series 2 (five figures)
- Dragon mini-figures (seven figures) (Wyvern, Basilisk, Gargouille, European, Amphithere, Asian Lung and Frost Dragon)
- Dragon plush toys (five) (Wyvern, Basilisk, European, Asian Lung and Frost Dragon)
- Wooden construction 'build your own' dragon model sets (four)
- 100 piece jigsaw puzzle "Dragons of the World"
- Dragonology video game (Nintendo DS, 2009)

== See also ==
- List of dragons in literature
- List of dragons in games
