= Vampireology: The True History of the Fallen =

2010 book by Nick Holt

Vampireology: The True History of the Fallen Ones
- Author: Nick Holt
- Language: English
- Series: Ologies
- Subject: Vampires
- Genre: Fantasy
- Publisher: Templar Publishing (UK); Candlewick Press (US)
- Publication date: 11 May 2010
- Publication place: United Kingdom
- Media type: Print (hardback)
- Preceded by: Oceanology
- Followed by: Alienology

Vampireology: The True History of the Fallen Ones is the ninth book in the Ologies series, created and published by Templar Publishing in the UK, and published by Candlewick Press in North America under the title Vampireology: The True History of the Fallen.

It is a fantasy book about vampires, marketed as having been written by vampire-slayer and "Protector" Archibald Brooks.

== Plot ==
The book purports to have been written in 1900 by Archibald Brooks, the main "Protector" (vampire slayer). Brooks sent a telegram to Joshua T. Kraik, a private investigator and his friend asking him to come to his office and, should he arrive too late, to look in the casket. Brooks was killed on the night of 10 May 1920 at his office in the British Museum. The next day, Joshua went to see his friend, and, when he did, he searched Brooks' office and found the book. He took a look in it to see that Brooks had planned for him to have it so Joshua took it home with him. When he started reading the book, he found he was to be the next Protector, so he read on, taking all the information seriously. He saw everything about the original three Fallen ones and their bloodlines: Moloch, the destroyer, whose bloodline kills for pleasure; Ba'al, the deceiver, whose bloodline has the powers of mind control; and Belial, the tortured, whose bloodline carries their ancestors' guilt over Belial's decision to rebel against Heaven. Belials can also feel the emotions that a normal person can, but are still compelled to feed on humans.

He added notes while he read through the book, things like how he is getting on, a little bit of personal life, drawings, bits of newspaper, his feelings about the book, drafts and letters.

On 14 May 1920 he gets a letter from a strange woman living in Venice, saying that she and Brooks used to be close acquaintances and that Brooks had once promised her the book. Joshua did not believe her, but he wrote back saying that he can't pass on the book yet but they should keep in touch. A few more letters and drafts later, he decides to visit her in Venice. While he is reading the book at his hotel he gets another letter, this one is short and straightforward and in Joshua's note he describes how terrifying it is and how a part of him always sensed that she was not what she seemed to be.

On the last page, hidden away is a letter addressed to Joshua. He tells Joshua to destroy her with the Sword of Angels (archangel Michael's sword that he used to defeat the three original Fallen Ones, Moloch, Ba'al and Belial, and is the only sword that can destroy the Fallen Ones). Brooks sheds some light on the mysterious Venice lady. Joshua leaves a note and two newspaper clippings. One reports the murder of another of Joshua's friends, and the other reports the burning of a palace in Venice, suggesting Joshua's victory in his first task as Protector.

The book ends here.

== Planned film adaptations ==
In 2018, Paramount Pictures acquired the rights to develop a film franchise based on all Ologies books, including a Vampireology portion of the series. Akiva Goldsman was hired to oversee a writers' room to write scripts for interconnected family films based on the books and supplemental materials, partnering with Weed Road studio colleague Greg Lessans as the film's producers.
