= Enter the Dragon (disambiguation) =

Enter the Dragon is a martial arts film starring Bruce Lee that was released in 1973.

- Enter the Dragon (soundtrack), the official soundtrack for the film

Enter the Dragon may also refer to:

== People ==
- Ding Junhui, a Chinese professional snooker player with the nickname Enter the Dragon

== Professional wrestling ==
- DGUSA Enter the Dragon, a professional wrestling pay-per-view event that took place in 2009

== Television ==
- "Enter the Dragon" (2point4 Children), an episode from the eighth series of the TV sitcom 2point4 Children
- "Enter the Dragon" (Xiaolin Showdown), an episode from the second season of the TV series Xiaolin Showdown
- "Enter the Dragon" (Once Upon a Time), an episode from the fourth season of the TV series Once Upon a Time

== See also ==
- Spyro: Enter the Dragonfly, a 2002 video game for the PlayStation 2 console
- Ender Dragon, a character in the video game Minecraft
