= Heroes and Villains (Once Upon a Time) =

- Once Upon a Time episode
- Episode no.: Season 4 Episode 11
- Directed by: Ralph Hemecker
- Written by: Edward Kitsis & Adam Horowitz
- Production code: 411
- Original air date: December 14, 2014

Guest appearances
- Raphael Alejandro as Roland; Kristin Bauer van Straten as Maleficent; Merrin Dungey as Ursula/Vanessa; Beverley Elliott as Widow Lucas/Granny (credit only); Scott Michael Foster as Kristoff; Georgina Haig as Elsa; Elizabeth Lail as Anna; Christie Laing as Marian; Sean Maguire as Robin Hood; Victoria Smurfit as Cruella De Vil

Episode chronology
← Previous "Shattered Sight"	Next → "Darkness on the Edge of Town"
- Once Upon a Time season 4

"Heroes and Villains" is the eleventh episode and mid-season finale of the fourth season of the American fantasy drama series Once Upon a Time, which aired on December 14, 2014. This episode marked the return of the villainess Maleficent, as well as the introductions of Cruella de Vil and Ursula the Sea Witch.

In this episode, Mr. Gold tries to kill Hook, but Belle stops him; Regina says goodbye to Robin Hood; and Elsa, Anna, and Kristoff go back to Arendelle. In the end, Mr. Gold talks Ursula into joining his cause. In flashbacks, Rumpelstiltskin saves Belle from Maleficent, Ursula, and Cruella De Vil.

== Title card ==
A magical door opens drawing snow falling into the portal.

== Plot ==
=== In The Characters' Past ===
In the Enchanted Forest, Belle opens up a cabinet when Rumpelstiltskin surprises her, having returned early from Camelot. He claims to have been testing her to see what she would do with him gone. He then presents Belle with a glove that can detect the weakness in a person. He says for most people weakness is who they love and that will point him in the right direction, thus the use of the glove. Later on Belle is serving tea to Rumplestiltskin while explaining why he collects items, only to send Belle out to wash and dry his laundry. Belle then spots a dalmatian puppy and follows it, only to be kidnapped by a figure in a fur cloak.

As Rumplestiltskin searches for Belle in the forest a raven drops a sand dollar from the sky, and it opens up a hologram of Belle, who she says he has to bring the gauntlet from Camelot to trade for her or else she will be killed. Rumplestiltskin, having seen the raven, is aware of who sent him the message. When he reaches the caverns by the ocean, Rumplestiltskin brings the gauntlet to the meeting point. Belle runs up to him but she's all tied up, and Maleficent appears, demanding the gauntlet. Rumplestiltskin uses his magic and chokes her, but she's brought along company: Ursula (who wraps her tentacles around Belle), and Cruella De Vil. Rumplestiltskin threatens them all and Cruella tells Ursula to crush Belle's heart. As Ursula tightens her tentacles, Rumplestiltskin throws the gauntlet to Cruella then lets Maleficent go. The women say they've lived too long in a world where the heroes always win and the gauntlet will change that. They leave Belle and disappear. When Belle asks why he did it, Rumplestilskin refuses to admit he cares about her but says he's the only one allowed to crush her heart.

Later, Rumplestilskin takes back the gauntlet from the Queen of Darkness, saying it was a ransom not a deal. Cruella says it won't do him any good since villains will never get a happy ending and invites him to join the women, but Rumplestiltskin says he will win and will win alone.

=== In Storybrooke ===
With Ingrid now dead, Elsa brings down the ice barrier, but Emma Swan knows that the spell is still in effect as she touches the barrier that is along the town limits. Anna then tells Elsa that they really need to leave Storybrooke: she tells her sister that Arendelle was taken over by Hans and his 12 brothers, so they ask Emma to help find a portal. When Hook informs Gold of this, Gold (using Hook's heart to see how Hook feels by partially crushing it) tells Hook that he knows Anna will interfere because of what she did to him back in the Enchanted Forest, so he wants Hook to keep Anna from finding out. Gold then says that as soon as he and Belle leave for New York City, he will kill Hook when the evening comes. Gold then goes to the back of his shop (where Belle had been sleeping) to wake up Belle to tell her that he plans to surprise with a trip to New York City, which was followed by bringing Hook with him to the mansion, where he tells Hook that the place actually belonged to The Sorcerer. With help from the magic enchanting broom, they see the portal materialize. Moments later, Hook returns to tell Emma about the portal, but in actuality, Gold is using Hook's heart to feed the lines to Hook so he can make Emma believe his story, giving Emma suspicious vibes about Hook, even after seeing his hand shaking.

Back at the shop, Belle is packing up for the trip when Henry arrives to help his grandmother. When Belle tells Henry to find another suitcase, he sees one and pulls it from the top of the cabinet and ends up dropping it. Among the items falling includes the gauntlet, which bring back memories for Belle. At the same time, Emma, Mary Margaret and David arrive to the mansion to make sure Anna, Elsa, and Kristoff make it back to Arendelle through the portal door. As they thank the three, especially Emma, Anna tells the three that she wanted to thank Hook and Gold, only to have David mentioned that Gold was once Rumplestiltskin, and Anna tells them that she knows of him from their past encounter; Emma discovers that Gold had been using everyone and he has not changed. As they race to the clock tower, Gold has Hook watch him put his plan into action by placing the hat into position and it is released. When Emma and Mary Margaret arrive to stop him, Gold freezes them and then attempts to crush Hook's heart, only to discover he cannot; Belle has the real dagger and the gauntlet glove. She uses the items to force Gold to give Hook's heart back to him and unfreeze Emma and Mary Margaret. Belle then orders Gold to send them to the town limits, where she demands Gold to explain his actions as to why he chose power over love, even if meant sacrificing one thing so they can be together. Gold tries to apologize, but Belle, betrayed and heartbroken, finally admits that he will never change and that she deserves better before tearfully using the dagger to banish Gold from Storybrooke. As Gold is forced out of the town, his leg injury returns and he crumples to the ground, crying out for Belle, whom he can no longer see.

In between these events, Regina and Robin were able to wake Marian up from her ice curse. At Granny’s, Marian thanked Regina for saving her even though letting her die would let her and Robin be together. Marian tells Regina that she knows Robin loves her and that she won’t stand in their way if they decide to resume their relationship. Regina tells Marian that she wants Robin to be happy with her for Roland's sake. However, as Regina tells Robin that he needs to be with Marian, the spell quickly resurfaced to freeze her heart. Regina tells Robin that in order for Marian to live, she must cross the town line and enter our world (and along with it, will no longer be able to return to Storybrooke), meaning the spell would not be able to harm her, but at the same time she tells Robin that both him and Roland have to accompany her. A reluctant Robin eventually gives in. As he, along with Marian and Roland, leaves Storybrooke, Robin gives Regina a final kiss before he leaves with his family to start their new life and identities. Also watching this was Gold, who tells Regina about the fairy tale book and that he doesn't know who was the author, but wishes her the best in finding her happy ending.

Later that evening, Emma places Hook's heart back in and they embrace and kiss, then she joins Regina for a drink at Granny's. Henry arrives to tells the two that he found a secret place in the Lakeside mansion. Henry pulls a wall sconces on a wall rotation and the wall opens to reveal a secret library that contains with full of blank potential storybooks, all with a cover similar to the fairytale books. With this revelation, Emma joins Henry and Regina in tracking down the author.

=== In Arendelle ===
Now that Elsa and Anna are back in Arendelle, Elsa, who has reclaimed the kingdom from Hans, is ready to help Anna prepare for her wedding to Kristoff. As Anna put on her gloves, she shows Elsa a painting of their mother and aunts that she found hidden away in the East wing of the castle. Elsa then walks Anna down the aisle.

=== Outside Storybrooke ===
Six weeks later in New York City, Gold pays a visit to an aquarium, where he has a meeting with a fish feeder, who is revealed to be Ursula. He tells her that he wants to get his happy ending, but the "heroes" stand in his way. He then tells Ursula to get ready and plans to pick up two more individuals to plot their scheme. He tells her that he realized that the villains will always lose, and that the only way to win is to change the game. It also turns out that Gold has someone in mind to help change the outcome; when Ursula asks who this is, Gold tells her that he's known as "the Author".

== Reception ==
Upon airing, the episode hit series low ratings, with 5.69 million American viewers watching and attaining an 18-49 rating/share of 1.7/5. The show placed fourth in its timeslot and sixth for the night. Including DVR viewership, the episode was watched by a total of 8.45 million viewers and attained an 18-49 rating of 2.9.

The episode received positive reviews from critics, with most noting the finishing to the Frozen story, and the acting of the central characters.

Hilary Busis of Entertainment Weekly gave a positive review: "As Homer Simpson once said: "Oh, I see! Then everything is wrapped up in a neat little package!" That's about where tonight's midseason finale—which may as well have been titled "Falling Action"—leaves us. "Heroes and Villains" isn't quite as definitively conclusive as last year's midseason finale—an hour that would have functioned perfectly well as a full series wrap-up—but it did have the whiff of a hand firmly closing a storybook called The One With the Frozen Tie-In. Which isn't to say that we'll never see the Arendelle gals again."

Amy Ratcliffe of IGN gave the episode a great review: "Tonight's Once proved yet again that the show is at its strongest when it's propelled by its primary cast instead of the current 'theme.' Regina, Rumple, and Belle all had beautiful scenes that were well performed, and it was a nice twist to see Belle stand up for herself and go to the extreme of banishing Rumple. That alone makes for an interesting back half of the season; let's keep our fingers crossed and hope the Queens of Darkness don't screw things up." Ratcliffe gave the episode an 8.8 rating out of 10.
