= Crawl (2011 film) =

- Theatrical film poster
- Directed by: Paul China
- Written by: Paul China
- Produced by: Benjamin China; Brian J. Breheny
- Starring: George Shevtsov; Georgina Haig; Paul Holmes
- Cinematography: Brian J. Breheny
- Edited by: Bin Li; John Scott
- Music by: Christopher Gordon
- Release dates: 15 October 2011 (Screamfest Film Festival); 20 November 2013 (Australia)
- Running time: 80 minutes
- Country: Australia
- Language: English

Crawl is a 2011 Australian suspense-thriller written and directed by Paul China and produced by Benjamin China. The film stars George Shevtsov, Georgina Haig and Paul Holmes.

== Plot ==
Slim Walding (Paul Holmes), a bar owner, hires a Croatian (George Shevtsov) to kill an acquaintance over an unpaid debt. The crime is carried out, but the culprit leaves behind the murder weapon, an antique pistol belonging to Slim (thus framing him for the homicide). As the Croatian makes his getaway, he accidentally runs down a stranded motorist. The murderer seeks refuge at a nearby, isolated house, where he holds a young woman, Marilyn Burns (Georgina Haig), hostage.

The Croatian learns that Marilyn's fiancé is the motorist he struck. To escape on a motorcycle (the only vehicle at hand), he returns to the crash site to retrieve the man's keys. There, the Croatian murders the fiancé, after discovering he is still alive. Later, Slim realizes that his prized pistol has been stolen and that he has been set up. Learning the Croatian's whereabouts, he heads off looking for revenge. At the house, however, after freeing bound-and-gagged Marilyn, Slim is killed when the Croatian unexpectedly attacks him with an axe. Marilyn then kills the Croatian.

== Cast ==
- George Shevtsov as The Stranger
- Georgina Haig as Marilyn Burns
- Paul Holmes as Slim Walding
- Lauren Dillon as Holly
- Lynda Stoner as Eileen
- Catherine Miller as Annie
- Andy Barclay as Travis
- Bob Newman as Rusty Sapp
- Paul Bryant as Sergeant Byrd
- John Rees-Osbourne as Constable Rolly

== Production ==
The film was shot on location in Queensland, Australia in late 2010.

== Soundtrack ==
Australian composer Christopher Gordon scored the film.

== Release ==
Crawl played at over thirty international film festivals, including Sitges Film Festival in Spain, FrightFest in the UK, and Brisbane International Film Festival in Australia. Bloody Disgusting released the film in the US on 1 September 2012, and Arrow Films released the film theatrically in the UK on 22 February 2013.

== Reception ==
Crawl received positive reviews from critics, scoring a 63% fresh rating on Rotten Tomatoes. Sean Decker of Dread Central said the film ″rivals No Country for Old Men in gritty style and suspense″ and was an ″assured Hitchcockian slow-burn.″ Journalist Alan Jones awarded the film four stars saying ″not since the Coen Brothers' Blood Simple has there been a more exciting thriller debut...a nail-bitingly effective study in slow-burning terror...scary, sly and sexy...a twisted and skillful homage to film noir.″

=== Accolades ===
Award	Category	Subject	Result
Screamfest Horror Film Festival	Festival Trophy for Best Actress	Georgina Haig	Won
Screamfest Horror Film Festival	Festival Trophy for Best Director	Paul China	Won
Screamfest Horror Film Festival	Festival Trophy for Best Cinematography	Brian J. Breheny	Won
