= Surviving Summer (TV series) =

2022 Australian television drama series

- Genre: Teen drama
- Created by: Joanna Werner; Josh Mapleston
- Starring: Sky Katz; Kai Lewins; Lilliana Bowrey; Joao Gabriel Marinho; Savannah La Rain
- Opening theme: "The Mother We Share" by Chvrches
- Countries of origin: Australia; Germany
- Original language: English
- No. of seasons: 2
- No. of episodes: 18

Production
- Executive producers: Stuart Menzies; Joanna Werner; Katharina Pietzsch
- Producer: Joanna Werner
- Production companies: Werner Film Productions; ZDF Studios

Original release
- Network: Netflix
- Release: 3 June 2022 – 15 September 2023

Surviving Summer is an Australian teen drama television series that premiered on 3 June 2022 on Netflix. The first season consists of 10 episodes. In November 2022, the series was renewed for a second season, which premiered on 15 September 2023.

The show was canceled after two seasons with Lilliana Bowrey confirming on social media that the show would not be returning for a third season.

== Plot ==
Rebellious teenager Summer Torres is expelled from her high school in Brooklyn and sent to stay with the family of an old friend of her mother's in Australia, where she falls in with a clique of competitive surfers, and trouble causes in her footsteps.

== Production ==
=== Development ===
The series was created by Joanna Werner and Josh Mapleston. Josh Mapleston, Magda Wozniak, Keir Wilkins, Gemma Crofts and Kirsty Fisher serve as writers. Ben Chessell served as a director, with Sian Davies and Charlotte George also directing episodes in the first season. Joanna Werner and Stuart Menzies served as executive producers & development for the series was announced in February 2021 when Netflix had commissioned the series Surviving Summer for the streaming service with Australian film & television production company Werner Film Productions producing alongside German production & distribution arm of ZDF, ZDF Enterprises, which would also handle distribution for the series. The series was initially conceived as a Parent Trap concept with two female cousins, but a request from Netflix to have the series appeal to boys as well led to one of the characters being changed to a boy, Ari. Filming occurred in a number of places in Victoria's Surf Coast: Aireys Inlet, Anglesea, Wye River, Lorne, Cumberland River and Bell's Beach. It consisted of two units working concurrently: one filming the drama and a separate unit shooting the surfing.

On 18 November 2022 the series was renewed for a second season. Season two aired on 15 September 2023. In 2025, it was confirmed that the show had been canceled.

== Cast ==
=== Main ===
- Sky Katz as Summer Torres, a rebellious teenager from Brooklyn, New York who is sent to live with family friends in the small town of Shorehaven on the Great Ocean Road, Victoria, Australia
- Kai Lewins as Ari Gibson, a young surfer who befriends Summer while recovering from a serious injury
- Lilliana Bowrey as Poppy Tetanui
- Joao Gabriel Marinho as Marlon Sousa, a Brazilian emigree to Shorehaven
- Savannah La Rain as Bodhi Mercer
- Annabel Wolfe as Wren Radic (season 2)
- Josh Macqueen as Baxter Radic (season 2)

=== Recurring ===
- Chris Alosio as Manu Tetanui, Poppy's older brother and a surf coach
- Dustin Clare and Adrienne Pickering as Ari's parents, Thommo and Abbie
- Pacha Luque-Light as rival surfer Lily Tran
- Mitchell Hardaker as Griff Temple
- Charli Wookey as Sheridan Morehouse
- Kate Beahan as Margot Torres, Summer's mother
- Olympia Valance as Elo Radic (season 2)
- Jane Allsop as Lucy

== Episodes ==
=== Series overview ===
| Series | Episodes | Originally released |
|---|---|---|
| 1 | 10 | 3 June 2022 |
| 2 | 8 | 15 September 2023 |

=== Season 1 (2022) ===
| No. overall | No. in season | Title | Directed by | Written by | Original release date |
|---|---|---|---|---|---|
| 1 | 1 | "Exile" | Ben Chessell | Josh Mapleston | 3 June 2022 |
Wild child Summer tries to settle into sleepy Shorehaven and meets young surfer Ari, who's on the mend from a serious injury but ready to compete.
| 2 | 2 | "Big Plans" | Ben Chessell | Josh Mapleston | 3 June 2022 |
At the beach, Summer gets in the way of Sheridan Morehouse, an Anchor Cove surfer, who breaks Summer's skateboard in return. At the Shorehaven Pro Juniors Finals, Marlon holds Ari back from a wave by tugging on his surfboard leash. Poppy's brother, Prawnie, agrees to give Summer a lift to the airport so she can fly back to New York. Ari confronts Marlon and the two physically fight on the beach before Manu separates them, emphasising the importance of community to Ari. Poppy beats Anchor Cove surfer Lily Tran in her heat. While Summer and Marlon go jetskiing, Ari runs into Bodhi, and the two go diving. While diving, Ari has a panic attack and remembers the accident. Back at the competition, Sheridan beats both Poppy and Bodhi. In a flashback to his accident, Ari relives jumping off Stairway, while Marlon faints and does not jump with him as planned. Ari has another panic attack before his heat, and Summer goes to calm him down, missing her ride from Prawnie to the airport. Marlon surfs and comes in second after Griff, an Anchor Cove surfer. Summer takes Sheridan's board and rolls her car over it, breaking it in vengeance for her skateboard. Margot calls Summer after discovering the credit card charge for the plane ticket, and tells Summer that she can be happy in Australia. Summer obliges and goes to eat dinner with the Gibsons.
| 3 | 3 | "Training Day" | Ben Chessell | Magda Wozniak & Josh Mapleston | 3 June 2022 |
Poppy teaches beginner classes at the Tetanui Surf School and clashes with Summer, who is showing Honey to skateboard. While out teaching on the ocean, Poppy sees Summer unsuccessfully trying to surf, and goes to help her. Summer tells Poppy she regrets calling Poppy a bad teacher, and Poppy confides in Summer about missing her mother, who recently passed from lymphoma. Later, Summer helps film Poppy's surfing. Summer also tries to convince the Gibsons to allow Ari to compete, telling them she wants to compete in the Jackson Bay competition, despite not being experienced enough. While reviewing the footage of her surfing, Poppy hears Manu in the background describing their mother as optimistic for believing that Poppy could be a world champion. She confronts him, telling him that she is out of practice because she is busy always teaching classes at the family surf school. Ari and Thommo go surfing, but Ari is unable to convince his dad to let him surf in the competition. Summer wants to go surfing, but is advised not to, as the surf is too strong. Summer ignores her and goes out to surf, but finds herself out of her depth. Poppy comes to her aid and gets her back to shore. Later, Ari apologises for not attending Poppy's mum's funeral and boosts her confidence by revealing that in order to improve his technique, Manu has given him tapes of Poppy's surfing. Later, Summer goes out surfing again, and Poppy and Ari accompany her.
| 4 | 4 | "Shame" | Charlotte George | Keir Wilkins | 3 June 2022 |
The crew heads to Jackson Bay for a major competition. Summer stirs up drama with a revealing game that brings Ari and Marlon's friendship to the brink.
| 5 | 5 | "Keep the Sponsors Happy" | Ben Chessell | Gemma Crofts & Josh Mapleston | 3 June 2022 |
Bodhi might catch her big break with a new sponsor - if Marlon doesn't ruin her shot. Poppy and Ari share a moment after a late-night training session.
| 6 | 6 | "No Pressure" | Sian Davies | Keir Wilkins | 3 June 2022 |
Ari and Bodhi try to hold their own against surfing pros - and among VIPs at a party. Summer helps Ari with his secret but wants him to seek real help.
| 7 | 7 | "For Laynah" | Sian Davies | Kristy Fisher | 3 June 2022 |
Poppy, with her mother's memory in mind, serves as the team captain during an event against rival surf clubs, Marlon starts to weigh his options.
| 8 | 8 | "Stairway" | Sian Davies | Josh Mapleston | 3 June 2022 |
Marlon wants to impress his new pals by surfing a notorious break, and Ari joins him. Summer gets desperate after getting an update about her stay.
| 9 | 9 | "Go" | Sian Davies | Keir Wilkins | 3 June 2022 |
Poppy socialises with a rival surfer. Ari and Summer sneak into the Jarrah Island competition together. Marlon must decide where his loyalty lies.
| 10 | 10 | "Stay" | Sian Davies | Josh Mapleston & Keir Wilkins | 3 June 2022 |
Margot arrives to take Summer home, while the crew tries to qualify for the state team. Bodhi gets in trouble during her heat. Ari makes a choice.

=== Season 2 (2023) ===
| No. overall | No. in season | Title | Directed by | Written by | Original release date |
|---|---|---|---|---|---|
| 11 | 1 | "Selection" | Sian Davies | Josh Mapleston | 15 September 2023 |
Ready to show off new skills, Summer returns to Shorehaven on the eve of state team try-outs. But she finds she's not the only one bringing surprises.
| 12 | 2 | "Team Bonding" | Sian Davies | Keir Wilkins | 15 September 2023 |
Tough new coach Elo puts the team through their paces. When Summer hosts a barbecue, a few impulsive decisions turn a quiet night into a rager.
| 13 | 3 | "Wait for It" | Sian Davies | Josh Mapleston | 15 September 2023 |
With her plans at risk, Summer buckles down to show how serious she is about competing. Bodhi goes on a date with an intriguing surfer from out of town.
| 14 | 4 | "A Seat At the Table" | Christiaan Van Vuuren | Huna Amweero | 15 September 2023 |
Ari faces new anxieties after signing a sponsorship deal. At a glam Subtropix shoot in Byron Bay, a photographer's approach rubs Bodhi the wrong way.
| 15 | 5 | "Purge" | Sian Davies | Alix Beane | 15 September 2023 |
A kiss gives Poppy a lot to think about while Bax tries to get Summer's mind off her problems. Tensions boil over among the team at surf camp.
| 16 | 6 | "I Promise" | Christiaan Van Vuuren | Josh Mapleston | 15 September 2023 |
Struggling to be honest with Wren, Ari ends up throwing her a birthday party, where a pitcher of special punch gets Poppy and Summer into trouble.
| 17 | 7 | "Suck It Up" | Christiaan Van Vuuren | Libby Butler | 15 September 2023 |
Unexpected truths emerge at Nationals, where the team work to move past their drama and ride into the finals. Wren lays her cards on the table.
| 18 | 8 | "Send It" | Christiaan Van Vuuren | Josh Mapleston | 15 September 2023 |
As pressure builds at the competition, Summer waits for the perfect wave. But with love on the line, winning on the water is only half the battle.

== Awards and nominations ==
| Award | Year | Category | Nominee(s) | Result | Ref. |
|---|---|---|---|---|---|
| Logie Awards | 2023 | Most Outstanding Children's Program | Surviving Summer | Nominated | |
