= Poor Unfortunate Soul =

- Once Upon a Time episode
- Episode no.: Season 4 Episode 15
- Directed by: Steve Pearlman
- Written by: Andrew Chambliss & Dana Horgan
- Production code: 415
- Original air date: March 22, 2015

Guest appearances
- Eion Bailey as August Booth; Kristin Bauer van Straten as Maleficent; Tiffany Boone as Young Ursula; Merrin Dungey as Ursula/Vanessa; Chris Gauthier as William Smee; Ernie Hudson as Poseidon; Sean Maguire as Robin Hood; Victoria Smurfit as Cruella de Vil/Cruella Feinberg; Joanna Garcia Swisher as Ariel

Episode chronology
← Previous "Enter the Dragon"	Next → "Best Laid Plans"
- Once Upon a Time season 4

"Poor Unfortunate Soul" is the fifteenth episode of the fourth season of the American fantasy drama series Once Upon a Time, which aired on March 22, 2015.

This episode centers around Ursula, and her acceptance of Hook's offer in order to get her happy ending, while flashbacks show Ursula's past with Hook.

== Title card ==
The sea-witch Ursula stands in the forest.

== Plot ==
=== In the Characters' Past ===
In the Neverland realm, Hook and his crew hear a mermaid's song, which distracts them until they almost strike a series of rocks. Around the same time, the father of the Seas, Poseidon, scolds his daughter, revealed to be Ursula in her youth, for ending the song just in time for the Jolly Roger to escape. Later on at a tavern during a port stop, Hook recognizes the same tune being sung by Ursula, and offers her a drink. She explains to Hook that her father kicked her out of his kingdom for disobeying him, so she stole a magical bracelet that allowed her to walk on land. Ursula also reveals that her mother was killed by a pirate, which is why Poseidon demands Ursula use her voice - the only thing that reminds her of her mother - to steer the ships awry. Hook tells Ursula that listening to her voice was the only thing that has ever taken away his lifelong pain. She shares her plan to sing in Glowerhaven, and he offers to take her there on his ship. Poseidon learns of this and instructs Hook to remove Ursula's ability to sing by using a seashell, in order to ensure that she will never leave the ocean, in exchange for giving Hook a vial of squid ink, which Hook can use to paralyze his enemy Rumplestiltskin.

Later, Hook returns and tells Ursula about her father's plan. Although he refuses to break his personal code, Hook asks Ursula to steal the squid ink from her father's storage. Ursula agrees, only to have Poseidon catch her, and in return for Hook betraying him, takes away his only chance to seek revenge on Rumplestiltskin. Hook then counters by stealing Ursula's singing voice to hurt Poseidon. After Hook leaves with Ursula's singing voice, the rift between father and daughter continues, prompting an enraged Ursula to snap and use Poseidon's trident to transform herself into the powerful sea goddess for which Ursula was named after, only stronger and more powerful than her father.

=== In Storybrooke ===
At Gold's remote cabin, Regina, Maleficent, Cruella, and Ursula start interrogating adult August Booth about the Author. He explains that he stole the research of a man in Hong Kong named The Dragon, and that the research is still currently in Storybrooke. Gold heads to August's trailer to get the research, and Regina uses her magic to briefly take over Mary Margaret's body to tell Emma Swan, Captain Hook, and David Nolan that August is safe, Gold is back, and the Queens have something big planned. They later relay this to Belle, who tells them that she gave the Dagger to Hook, only to learn that Gold transformed himself into Hook to retrieve it, leading them to discover that Gold has restored his powers once again with the dagger. This information gives Hook an idea as he reveals his past encounter with Ursula, saying that the time has now come to take advantage of the Sea Goddess and to restore her happy ending.

Later, Hook uses a conch shell to summon Ursula and he offers her a deal: in exchange for finding out Gold's plan involving the Author, Hook will return her voice. When Ursula asks Hook where the magical shell is, he responds that it is located inside the Jolly Roger back in the Enchanted Forest. Ursula opens a portal into the Jolly Roger, which has been turned into a model ship in a bottle. Hook and Ursula, with help from Will Scarlet, restore the Jolly Roger. Hook gathers the shell with Ursula's voice and returns it to her, but the magic does not work and her voice does not return. A furious Ursula then takes her revenge out on Hook by saying that the deal is over, and uses her tentacles to send Hook overboard. He is rescued by Ariel, who explains that Blackbeard used the Jolly Roger to terrorize many people, including Anna and Kristoff from Arendelle, (as seen in "Fall"), so Queen Elsa contained the ship in a bottle in anger for Blackbeard hurting her family, accidentally trapping Ariel as well in the process, and thanks to Hook, Ariel is now free and repays him with a favor.

Regina is still trying to control her feelings for Robin Hood, and has a nightmare in which she fights the "Evil Queen" version of herself over the affections of her former love. Gold suddenly returns from August's trailer to inform her that August lied about The Dragon. He feeds August a temporary, painful potion that turns August back into wood and causes his nose to grow every time he lies, and holds August's nose to the fire. August says that the Sorcerer trapped the Author behind a door but he does not know where the door is, except that it is in Storybrooke and that Regina has seen it before in one of the pages. Gold, Regina, and Maleficent head to the Sorcerer's mansion to look for the door. Moments later, Emma, Mary Margaret, and David break into Gold's cabin and knock out Cruella. They are then surprised by Ursula, who briefly uses her tentacles to strangle Mary Margaret before being surprised by Hook, who tells Ursula that only the person who enchanted the shell can reverse it. Poseidon appears, having been brought through a portal by Ariel. Poseidon apologizes to his daughter for everything, and returns her singing voice so that he can hear the voice of his wife one last time. After Ursula and Poseidon are reunited and leave, Hook tells Emma that his happy ending is to be with her, but he fears he will lose her because he is a villain. August is rescued but Cruella has escaped, and later meets up with Gold, Regina, and Maleficent, saying that Ursula was a mole, much to Regina's relief.

Hook learns from Ursula about Gold's plans, revealing that as long as Emma is in Storybrooke to give everyone their happy endings, the Author will be unable to give villains theirs, and the only way to change that is for Gold to fill Emma's heart with darkness. At the same time, Regina meets with Emma to ask her if she can help track down Robin Hood and later asks August about the door; August says that the picture of the door is not just an illustration, but is the door itself. The Author is actually trapped inside the "Once Upon a Time" book.

== Cultural references ==
- The episode is named after a song from the Disney film The Little Mermaid.
- Ursula's backstory is largely based on Ariel's backstory from the Disney film, The Little Mermaid: Ariel's Beginning.
- Ursula vocalizes the reprise of "Part of Your World" and sings "Fathoms Below" during the episode. Both are from the Disney film The Little Mermaid.
- The town Ursula wishes to travel to, Glowerhaven, was mentioned in the Disney film The Little Mermaid as the home of a princess that Grimsby had introduced Prince Eric to.

== Reception ==
=== Ratings ===
The episode drew a 1.8/9 rating among 18-49s, with 5.69 million viewers, which remained steady from the previous outing, but remained the most-watched scripted show of the night.

=== Reviews ===
The episode was met with positive reviews.

Amy Ratcliffe of IGN said of the episode, "Once Upon a Time has reversed or otherwise twisted existing Disney backstories for the series and even used elements from one character's past for another character (Rumplestiltskin is both the Crocodile and the Beast), but what they did with Ursula was different. The core of her origin was diluted by The Little Mermaid touches. And even if those touches were chosen because they softened the character, it was still too much of a tie to Ariel." Ratcliffe gave the episode a 7.3 rating out of 10.

Hilary Busis of Entertainment Weekly responded to the episode with, "And then there were two? By that, of course, I'm referring to the Queens of Darkness—an exclusive club that may have just become a duo (plus or minus a double-crossing Regina), now that Ursula has apparently achieved her happy ending. (Inasmuch as it's possible for a villain to achieve a happy ending in Once's universe, given what we learned at the end of tonight's episode.) Could it be that this is how season 4B's Big Bads are dispatched—one at a time, until there's nobody evil left standing save Rumple? It'd make sense, given OUAT's penchant for half-season arcs ruled by baddies who disappear in or right before the finale."
