= Josh Mapleston =

Australian writer and actor

- Born: Joshua Mapleston; 20th century Brisbane, Queensland, Australia
- Education: Queensland University of Technology
- Occupations: Actor, screenwriter
- Years active: 2010 – present
- Spouse: Georgina Haig (m. 2014)
- Children: 2

Joshua Mapleston (born 20th century) is an Australian writer, comic, and actor. He was the head writer and executive producer on Ghosts Australia for BBC Australia. He was the co-creator and writer on two seasons of Netflix's Surviving Summer.

== Early life and education ==
Mapleston grew up in Brisbane, Queensland. He completed a Bachelor of Arts majoring in film production at the Queensland University of Technology.

== Career ==
In 2017, Mapleston won an Emmy Award for 'Outstanding Writing in Children's Animation' for his work on Beat Bugs. He is also one of the principal writers for the follow-up animated series Motown.

In the comedy sphere, Mapleston created and wrote I Rock, a narrative comedy series about a struggling indie band. He also starred as the band's misanthropic frontman Nash Taylor.

Mapleston wrote and script-edited the action-comedy series Maximum Choppage. In the same year, he co-created and wrote the web series Ultimate Fanj (Working Group/ABC Television Australia) about the lives of hapless hipsters in inner-city Sydney.

Mapleston's credits also include a number of Australian drama series, including the romantic comedy The Wrong Girl (Playmaker Media) based on the novel by Zoe Foster Blake, the dramedy House Husbands (Playmaker Media) and the television adaptation of John Marsden's action-adventure novels Tomorrow, When the War Began (Ambience Entertainment).

Mapleston has been nominated for two Australian Writers' Guild awards for his work on young-adult drama series Ready for This and Dance Academy. In addition to writing duties, he was also Dance Academy's Series Script Editor for Seasons 2 and 3. Both shows were nominated for International Emmy Awards for "Best Children's Series".

As a stand-up comic Mapleston has been performing in Australia for over ten years.

Mapleston was the co-creator, script producer and writer of Netflix's Surviving Summer.

In 2025 Mapleston is executive producing and writing for Ghosts Australia which will premiere on Paramount Plus.

Other writing credits include:

- Home and Away, 2007 – present (12 episodes)
- Shortland Street, 2007 (1 episode)
- McLeod's Daughters, 2001

== Personal life ==
In June 2014, Mapleston married actress Georgina Haig. In March 2017, they had their first child, a daughter. In February 2024, the couple revealed that they were expecting their second child, a boy.
