= Enter the Dragon (Once Upon a Time) =

- Once Upon a Time episode
- Episode no.: Season 4 Episode 14
- Directed by: Ralph Hemecker
- Written by: David H. Goodman & Jerome Schwartz
- Production code: 414
- Original air date: March 15, 2015

Guest appearances
- Tony Amendola as Geppetto/Marco; Eion Bailey as August Booth/Pinocchio; Kristin Bauer van Straten as Maleficent; Sarah Bolger as Aurora; Merrin Dungey as Ursula/Vanessa; Beverley Elliott as Granny; Sebastian Roché as King Stefan; Victoria Smurfit as Cruella de Vil/Cruella Feinberg; Jakob Davies as young Pinocchio; Noah Beggs as Bartender (credit only); Russell Roberts as Visiting Duke

Episode chronology
← Previous "Unforgiven"	Next → "Poor Unfortunate Soul"
- Once Upon a Time season 4

"Enter the Dragon" is the fourteenth episode of the fourth season of the American fantasy drama series Once Upon a Time, which aired on March 15, 2015.

In this episode, Regina goes undercover for the heroes; and Mr. Gold masquerades as Hook, while flashbacks show how she and Maleficent met.

== Title card ==
A short tree stand ablaze in the Enchanted Forest.

== Plot ==
=== Event Chronology ===
The Enchanted Forest events take place after "Labor of Love (Once Upon a Time)" and before "Fruit of the Poisonous Tree". The Storybrooke events take place after "Unforgiven".

=== In the Characters' Past ===
In the Enchanted Forest, before the Dark Curse, Rumplestiltskin finds Regina exploring Maleficent's spell book. However, Rumplestiltskin tells her that she is rushing into this too fast, saying that the key to Maleficent's skills is time, and sends Regina to Maleficent's palace, where she sees a tree still burning from Maleficent's wrath "half a lifetime" after she burned down a forest. Regina enters Maleficent's palace to discover a disheveled, depressed Maleficent; the sorceress explains that an encounter with Briar Rose drained her of all her spirit. Regina tells her that Briar Rose's daughter, Aurora, is about to be married. Regina is furious to see heroes getting happy endings, and, after Maleficent reveals that her fire and ability to transform into a dragon has disappeared, Regina decides to use the royal wedding to inspire Maleficent.

Regina takes Maleficent to the remnants of the forest that the sorceress once burned and shows her the tree that is burning eternally. Maleficent attempts to channel the fire back into her body but she still lacks the ability to transform and the duo are captured by King Stefan, who had ruined Maleficent's plans in the past, and his guards. Regina refuses to give up and burns through the ropes binding her hands; she throws a fireball at a guard before her magic begins to fail her, which prompts Maleficent to realize that she does not want to go down without a fight, thus rekindling her fire and allowing her to transform into her dragon form. As they reach the castle, Maleficent and Regina are able to find Aurora, whom Maleficent puts under her legendary sleeping curse. Afterwards, Regina returns to see Rumplestiltskin, who is very impressed that she helped Maleficent regain her fire. Regina reveals that she has realized that she already had the perfect teacher all along in Rumplestiltskin, and feels that there are fates worse than death, one of them being the sleeping curse.

=== In Storybrooke ===
An undercover Regina meets with Maleficent, Ursula, and Cruella to convince them that she is still a villain, and the Queens start testing Regina's loyalty to them in a night of debauchery. Mary Margaret and David worry that something has happened to Regina when she does not return as planned. After the couple finds her, Regina explains that she needs time to learn about their "very powerful" secret plan. Later on, Maleficent, Cruella, and Ursula meet with Gold, who is convinced that Regina has reverted to her evil ways because of the heartbreak she has gone through, but cryptically adds that, "When war hits Storybrooke, everyone will have to pick a side."

Maleficent then meets up with Regina, revealing that they, too, are after the Author and that they have leads that Regina does not. She says that The Queens are willing to share the leads if Regina helps them with a task. The Queens are planning to reverse the history and destiny of every story that was ever written in the "Once Upon a Time" fairy tale book so the heroes will become the losers this time, and Regina must go with Maleficent to steal something. When Regina tells Hook and the Charmings about this, Emma Swan decides that she will follow. At the same time, Maleficent takes Regina to Marco's house, where it is revealed that the item they intend to steal is Pinocchio, and by kidnapping the now-human boy, it will prove to Maleficent that Regina is on their side.

After Regina completes the tasks by knocking both Marco and Pinocchio unconscious, Emma enters, having tracked Regina's phone, and says she thinks that things have gone too far. Regina swears to Emma that she will protect Pinocchio. Maleficent is now convinced that Regina is on their side after she completed the kidnapping of the boy, but at this point Regina decides to keep Emma from following her, and she drops her phone on purpose.

Hook steals Belle away from a date with Will Scarlet and tells her his suspicions that the Queens are after the Dark One's dagger and plan to use it to force the Dark One to find the Author. The twosome agree to hide the dagger, but Belle has a strange feeling that Gold is already in Storybrooke, so Hook suggests that she try to conjure him. Belle uses the dagger to try to summon Gold, but he does not appear, and she gives the dagger to Hook and leaves. However, it is revealed that Belle calling the Dark One to her did not work because Gold was already there, masquerading as Hook in an attempt to acquire the dagger. Gold, as Hook, goes to the pawn shop to make Belle promise to never mention the events that transpired with the dagger, to which she agrees, believing it to be the safest option. He then questions her about her relationship with Will. She responds that she could never be truly over Gold but that Will makes her happy for the time being.

Later, Maleficent brings Regina to Gold's remote cabin, where Regina is shocked to find Gold back in Storybrooke, and with his reclaimed dagger. Gold then uses his magic to turn Pinocchio back into his older self, August Booth, who might know about the Author, now that his memories have been restored.

== Cultural references ==
- This episode is a rendition of the Sleeping Beauty fairytale and the 1959 Disney animated film Sleeping Beauty, with Queen Briar Rose/Sleeping Beauty, Maleficent, Princess Aurora, Prince Phillip and the King Stefan.
- Aurora is humming "Once Upon a Dream" from Disney's Sleeping Beauty.

== Reception ==
=== Ratings ===
The episode drew a 1.8/9 rating among 18-49s, with 5.88 million viewers, nearly 3% down from the previous outing, but was the most-watched scripted show of the night.

=== Critical reception ===
The episode was met with positive reviews.

Amy Ratcliffe of IGN said of the episode, "Maleficent is taking center stage among the Queens of Darkness so far, and while more backstories are probably ahead, they've done a solid job so far of balancing the "theme" with the primary cast. Many of them are woven into the Queens's pasts and future plans, and it's such a relief to know there is a way to tell stories about these big characters and not completely push the longtime residents of Storybrooke aside." Ratcliffe gave the episode an 8.6 rating out of 10. Rebecca Jane Stokes of Den of Geek gave the episode a 4 out of 5, noting the show's improvement over previous episodes, saying "After a rough couple of weeks, it was great to see Once Upon A Time do what it does really, really well -- provide a great forum for complex, strong female characters to strive, battle, fail, and persevere. Also, for them to do ridiculous things and make fools of themselves to my continual delight."

Hilary Busis of Entertainment Weekly said, "Somebody call Valerie Cherish, because the subtitle of tonight's Once may as well have been "The Comeback." The hour saw three—count 'em!—big resurgences, two in the main storyline and one in the fairyback... all of which involved villains, or at least morally ambiguous figures. (Remember when August tried to convince Rumple that he was actually Baelfire? Doesn't that seem like it happened 75 years ago?)" Jevon Phillips of the Los Angeles Times commented on Rumplestiltskin's role, simple saying he "stole the show with a few roundhouses of his own."
