= Darkness on the Edge of Town (Once Upon a Time) =

- Once Upon a Time episode
- Episode no.: Season 4 Episode 12
- Directed by: Jon Amiel
- Written by: Edward Kitsis and Adam Horowitz
- Production code: 412
- Original air date: March 1, 2015

Guest appearances
- Kristin Bauer van Straten as Maleficent; Victoria Smurfit as Cruella De Vil/Cruella Feinberg; Merrin Dungey as Ursula/Vanessa; Keegan Connor Tracy as Blue Fairy/Mother Superior; Beverley Elliott as Granny; Michael Querin as Banker/Mr. Feinberg (Cruella's Husband); Panou as FBI Agent; Daniel Dae Kim as Fast Food Worker (voice) - uncredited

Episode chronology
← Previous "Heroes and Villains"	Next → "Unforgiven"
- Once Upon a Time season 4

"Darkness on the Edge of Town" is the twelfth episode and spring premiere of the fourth season of the American fantasy drama series Once Upon a Time, which aired on March 1, 2015.

In this episode, Hook and Belle attempt to find a solution to liberate the fairies from the Sorcerer's hat. Emma, Henry, and Regina continue their investigation to track down the author of the storybooks, while a strange darkness called Chernabog threatens Storybrooke. In New York, Mr. Gold acquires a new ally named Cruella De Vil with the help of Ursula. Flashbacks show how Ursula, Maleficent, and Cruella met.

== Title card ==
Cruella de Vil's car drives through the Enchanted Forest.

== Plot ==
=== In The Characters' Past ===
"Many years ago" in the Enchanted Forest, a gathering takes place at Maleficent's Forbidden Fortress, with Maleficent, Ursula and Cruella De Vil being brought together by an unknown person. Before they can fight amongst themselves, the person responsible for this meeting, Rumplestiltskin, appears with a plan to change their happy endings. The ladies are skeptical about his plan at first, but they listen and agree to join him.

At a nearby mountain, Rumplestiltskin points out to the ladies that the curse, concealed in an orb, lies within the deepest part of the area, but to reach it they must first get through a series of obstacles perfectly suited to their talents. After they complete the tasks, they hand the orb to Rumplestiltskin, who reveals he was simply using them and leaves them to die at the hands of the demon Chernobog, the Guardian of the mountain. The ladies hide from the demon, who seeks the person with the heart that has the darkest potential, until Maleficent notices a large crack in the wall that would provide escape. The ladies come out of hiding and while Chernobog targets Maleficent, Ursula and Cruella escape. Maleficent, thinking they are abandoning her, fights off the demon until Ursula rescues her by using her tentacles to pull her to safety.

=== Outside Storybrooke ===
It has been six weeks since Mr. Gold was banished to the real world. Since then, he has been making himself at home at Ursula's apartment in New York City, eating Ramen and mooching off of a furious Ursula, leading to tensions between the two. However, they put their differences aside when Gold receives an e-mail he states will end their troubles. Following this, they go to Great Neck, Long Island, where they meet a distraught Cruella de Vil watching her belongings being seized by the FBI after her criminal husband is arrested. After Gold arrives to see her lose everything, he tells her about joining him and Ursula on a trip to a place where magic exists, Storybrooke, where they hope to seek out the author of the "Once Upon a Time" book, whom Gold believes ruined their lives in the first place and can give them their happy endings.

=== In Storybrooke ===
During the six weeks, long after Gold was banished from Storybrooke, the residents are shown to be going back to their regular lives. Henry going to school, Mary Margaret goes back to teaching, Regina resumes being Mayor of Storybrooke and Emma Swan continues her job as Sheriff and her growing relationship with Hook. During the six weeks, Hook and Belle have been working together attempting to find a solution to liberate the fairies from Sorcerer's hat, they talk about their feelings towards Gold and their lives as they attempt to move on from what Gold did to them. Finding a solution, the two visit Regina and Emma in Regina's office, where Regina talks about the torn page of her and Robin Hood embracing after Emma finds it in a drawer. Hook informs the two that they managed to get a professor to translate a counter spell to free the fairies from the hat, but they need Regina to cast it. When the foursome, along with Mary Margaret, return to the woods, Regina uses the Dark One's dagger to release the fairies. Unfortunately, no one notices that just seconds after the fairies are freed, the hat releases a thick, black smoke that begins to ooze out, floating into the sky and forming the shape of the winged demon Chernobog, who flies away. As the town, save for a remorseful Hook, celebrates the fairies' return, Regina asks the Mother Superior about the author. She responds that the author and sorcerer are two different people and that the author had left behind clues to his identity in his works. The celebration is interrupted by earthquake-like thunder and strange cries. The people rush outside to find Chernobog perched on the clock tower. Realizing he must have been released from the hat, Emma asks if they can capture him again, but Belle explains that because he was released from the hat, he cannot be placed back in. Emma and Regina attempt to use their magic to destroy the demon but quickly discover all they can do is temporarily repel it.

Meanwhile, Gold, Cruella and Ursula arrive at the town limits, where Gold placed a marker on the tree after his banishment. Both Ursula and Cruella are skeptical at first to trust Gold, but since he was banned, he tells them that he has to trust them to enter Storybrooke first and then come back for him if they choose. Gold then hands Ursula his phone to call Regina, and the queens ask to enter Storybrooke, saying they have realized the error of their ways and have decided to turn over a new leaf and be good. Regina does not trust them but makes a reluctant deal to let them in if they can help destroy Chernobog. The queens inform them what Chernobog is looking for and Regina suspects he is after her because she has the darkness in her heart. This gives Emma the idea to coax the demon to the town border since a creature made of magic should disappear when crossing into a land without magic. Regina and Emma drive to the town border as Chernobog attacks them. As the demon smashes the windshield, Regina vanishes and reappears at the line, trying to distract him. Emma slams on the brakes as she approaches the border and Chernobog is thrown off the car and across the line, where he disappears. Regina and Emma see Cruella and Ursula standing on the other side of the town line, but both David and Mary Margaret, who have just shown up, are reluctant to let them in, which surprises Emma since they both always want to see the good in people. They decide to give Cruella and Ursula another chance and the two are given the Snow Queen's magic scroll which allows them to cross the line. Hours later, the queens return and let Gold in using the same scroll. With that plan out of the way, Gold tells the queens that he, posing online as a professor with knowledge of translating ancient texts, was the one who told Belle how to free the fairies while releasing Chernobog at the same time, and plans to resurrect Maleficent and reveals that the Chernobog was actually after Emma, as Gold sees her as the one with the "darkest potential."

Later that night, David and Mary Margaret meet Cruella and Ursula and Mary Margaret says that they will allow them to stay on the condition that they must never speak to anyone about what happened between them in the Enchanted Forest, especially to Emma. If they do, Mary Margaret threatens to personally rip out each of their hearts.

== Reception ==
=== Ratings ===
The return from the break saw an improvement in the numbers, placing a 2.2/6 among 18-49s, with 6.66 million viewers tuning in.

=== Reviews ===
The episode was met with positive reviews.

Amy Ratcliffe of IGN gave the episode a great review: "Once Upon a Time started the back half of Season 4 off on a strong foot. The appearance of Chernabog was brief but put a few different plots in motion, and besides the flashy aspect of introducing new villains and creatures, tonight's episode featured some quieter, gratifying scenes between series regulars." Ratcliffe gave the episode an 8.5 rating out of 10.

Hilary Busis of Entertainment Weekly noted, "On one hand, it's exciting to see the show get back to its roots by introducing characters from stories older than the year 2013. On the other, Once has never exactly suffered from a dearth of characters, and it seems like it'll be impossible to give each of these ladies the attention they deserve when they're all constantly fighting against one another—not to mention the billions of other personalities already in Once's Disney vault—for screen time."
