= Unforgiven (Once Upon a Time) =

- Once Upon a Time episode
- Episode no.: Season 4 Episode 13
- Directed by: Adam Horowitz
- Written by: Andrew Chambliss & Kalinda Vazquez
- Production code: 413
- Original air date: March 8, 2015

Guest appearances
- Kristin Bauer van Straten as Maleficent; Victoria Smurfit as Cruella de Vil/Cruella Feinberg; Merrin Dungey as Ursula/Vanessa; Beverley Elliott as Granny; Tony Amendola as Geppetto/Marco; Jakob Davies as young Pinocchio

Episode chronology
← Previous "Darkness on the Edge of Town"	Next → "Enter the Dragon"
- Once Upon a Time season 4

"Unforgiven" is the thirteenth episode of the fourth season of the American fantasy drama series Once Upon a Time, which aired on March 8, 2015.

In this episode, David and Mary Margaret investigate Ursula and Cruella; and Regina and Henry ask Marco and Pinocchio for help, while flashbacks show Snow and David's past with the Queens of Darkness and a dark secret that needs to be hidden.

== Title card ==
Maleficent as a dragon flies through the Enchanted Forest.

== Plot ==
=== In the Characters' Past ===
In the Enchanted Forest, pre-first curse, Snow White and Charming ride back to their castle after their honeymoon to discover everyone in town has been struck by a sleeping spell. They call out for Regina, only to have Maleficent appear to admit the spell was her doing. She then introduces her associates Cruella and Ursula, and says that they have come to make a deal. The Queens tell Snow and Charming that Regina has stolen the darkest curse from Maleficent, and that the tree of wisdom and it can tell them how to defeat Regina and the curse, but it will only answer to two of the most valiant heroes.

As they reach the location of the tree of wisdom, Snow and Charming each place a hand on a designated rock nearby and they ask how to stop the Regina's curse. The tree lights up with gold and then red and they are blown backward. Maleficent reveals that Snow is pregnant, and says that, while they may be heroes, their daughter has the potential to either become good or evil, and could become the darkest villain the realm has ever seen.

Maleficent later visits Snow White and says that she, too, is expecting a child, and that they need to work together to stop Regina and the Dark Curse from harming their children and the land. Snow declines Maleficent's offer due to the latter being a villain, and tells her that they will not turn to darkness to ensure the safety of the kingdom.

=== In Storybrooke ===
Mary Margaret has a nightmare wherein Maleficent threatens her family; she wakes and finds David sitting on the stairs drinking whiskey, struggling to sleep with the new villains in town. They attempt to come up with a plan to make the Queens leave Storybrooke before their secret is revealed.

The following morning at Granny's diner, Cruella and Ursula remind others of Regina's formerly wicked ways in front of Henry, prompting Regina to threaten them with expulsion from town. Emma Swan and Captain Hook enter, and Hook is startled by Ursula, with whom he shares a secretive past.

Queens visit Gold's pawn shop, where they receive an unwelcome greeting from Belle. They steal a wooden box and head to the cave where Gold is hiding. After David and Emma sees the Queens leave the shop, Emma calls Belle and learns that a box disappeared from the shop. David and Emma stop the Queens and David searches the vehicle, discovering the box a jeweled bauble it contains. He takes the bauble but tells Emma there was nothing in the car. He later informs Mary Margaret that the Queens are planning to bring back Maleficent through a resurrection spell, which gives Mary Margaret a plan to keep her from coming back to life.

The Charmings lie about going on a hike while actually going to the tunnels where Maleficent was once slain. As they come upon Maleficent's ashes, they are knocked out by Ursula's tentacles, allowing Cruella to slice their hands to take a sample of their blood. She then pours the blood of the people who had wronged Maleficent on the ashes, and it is revealed that the stolen box was bait to lure the two into a trap planned by Gold. The ashes then swirl until a dragon is formed, which crashes towards the ground, and Maleficent reappears in human form. Maleficent informs Mary Margaret that she is not worried about their secret, since her goal is to see her family suffer and revel in their pain until the time comes when they meet again. After the reunited Queens disappear, David tells Mary Margaret it is time to tell Emma the truth.

Meanwhile, Emma is still pressing Hook about his past with Ursula, and admits that they had an ugly history. While Emma believes she can trust Hook to tell her when the time comes, she begins to start questioning her parents' motives, which they overhear. They then come into the office with news that Maleficent has reappeared in Storybrooke, giving Emma more concern about the Queens' plans for revenge, with Mary Margaret reminding Emma that they are heroes and the Queens are villains.

Regina and Henry are scouring the fairy tale book for clues to the author's identity. They come across additional pages about Pinocchio, suggesting that, before he reverted to his form as normal boy, August Booth may have known about the author. Regina decides to bring both the boy and Marco into the office. When Emma stops by to see Regina, she asks her to see if he can remember his life before returning to a boy but Pinocchio has no memory of being August and Regina snaps at him, infuriating Marco, who asks why she deserves a happy ending. She reminds him that he lied his way into bringing Pinocchio into the real world and Marco warns Regina to stay away from Pinocchio; hours later she stops by Marco's shop to apologize, and Marco gives her a bag of August's belongings, in which Henry later discovers a page with an illustration of a door and a note that reads "Author."

At the town limits, Regina meets with Mary Margaret to come up with a plan to find out about what the Queens are plotting, and suggest that Regina get close to them. As Regina asks Mary Margaret about the reason for this, Mary Margaret tells her that, back in the Enchanted Forest, they made a deal with Maleficent that resulted in her betraying the sorceress. It turns out that because Emma was born with the potential for great darkness, they took steps to prevent their daughter from turning evil, and caused Maleficent to lose her child.

At the same time, Gold watches Belle from the window of the pawn shop, and is stunned to see Will kissing his wife, while Maleficent puts together a totem and conjures up a baby rattle.

== Reception ==
=== Ratings ===
The episode was off slightly from the previous outing with a 2.1/6 among 18-49s with 6.60 million viewers tuning in.

=== Reviews ===
The episode was met with mixed to positive reviews.

Amy Ratcliffe of IGN gave the episode a good review: "Tonight's Once happily revealed David and Mary Margaret's secret to us, but in a confusing move, they decided to keep concealing the truth from Emma. While honesty would have been more in character, their decision to lie does set up a potentially interesting plot for Regina." Ratcliffe gave the episode a 7.5 rating out of 10.

Hilary Busis of Entertainment Weekly has a good but mixed review: "Once has us mostly treading water, especially with a fairyback that neglected to provide any real answers."
