= Tiffany Boone =

American actress

- Education: California Institute of the Arts
- Occupation: Actress
- Years active: 2006–present

Tiffany Boone is an American actress, best known for her roles as Roxy Jones in Hunters, Mandy Lang in the second season of the FOX TV series The Following and for her supporting roles as Savannah Snow and Mimi in the fantasy film Beautiful Creatures and the horror-comedy film Detention, respectively.

== Early life ==
Boone was raised by her mother in Baltimore, Maryland. Her mother works for the Social Security Administration. Her father was murdered in 1991, when she was three. In 2009, Boone graduated from California Institute of the Arts.

== Filmography ==
=== Film ===
Year	Title	Role	Notes
2006	Hamilton	Briana	
2011	Detention	Mimi	
2013	Beautiful Creatures	Savannah Snow	
2015	The Curse of Downers Grove	Senior Girl #1	
2017	Feed	Casey	
2019	A Madea Family Funeral	SEEiT Choir	
2020	The Midnight Sky	Maya Peters	
2024	Mufasa: The Lion King	Adult Sarabi (voice)	
2026	Your Mother Your Mother Your Mother	Fugazi	

=== Television ===
Year	Title	Role	Notes
2012	Southland	Crystal	2 episodes
2012	Suburgatory	Alice	1 episode
2013	Grey's Anatomy	Jaelyn Donovan	1 episode
2013	Perception	Teenage Girl	1 episode
2014	The Following	Mandy Lang	Main role, 12 episodes
2014	Major Crimes	Keisha Perry	1 episode
2015	Once Upon a Time	Young Ursula	Episode: "Poor Unfortunate Soul"
2015	Complications	Ingrid Meyers	4 episodes
2018–2019	The Chi	Jerrika	Main role, 16 episodes
2020–2023	Hunters	Roxy Jones	Main role, 18 episodes
2020	Little Fires Everywhere	Young Mia Warren	Miniseries, 2 episodes
2021	Nine Perfect Strangers	Delilah	Main role, 8 episodes
2024	The Big Cigar	Gwen Fontaine	miniseries
