= Sky Katz =

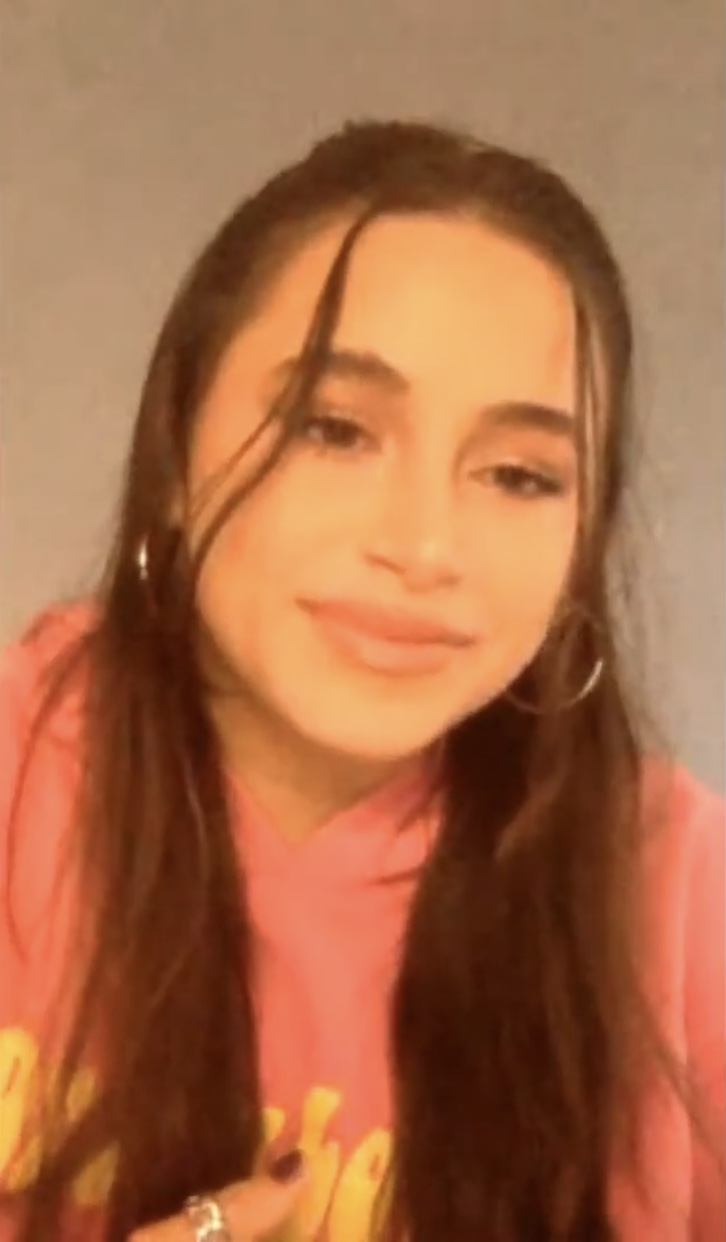
- Katz in 2022
- Born: December 12, 2004 (age 21)
- Occupations: Actress; rapper
- Years active: 2016–present
- Known for: Raven's Home
- Musical career
- Genres: Pop; R&B; Pop rap
- Instrument: Vocal

Sky Katz (born December 12, 2004) is an American actress, rapper and singer. She co-starred as Tess in the Disney Channel sitcom Raven's Home, which earned her a nomination at the 48th Daytime Emmy Awards for Outstanding Principal Performance in a Children's Program, and was the star of Netflix's Surviving Summer.

== Career and personal life ==
Katz was first seen as a rapper contestant on America's Got Talent, then began acting with her role as Tess in the Disney Channel Original Series Raven's Home. She would later be nominated in her role for the Outstanding Younger Performer in a Children’s Program in 2021 alongside two of her castmates.

In 2017, Katz released the debut single "For Da Summer". She also appeared on the soundtrack for the 2019 Disney Channel live-action Kim Possible movie.

In 2022, Katz released a new single titled "Breakup Song". Later that year she starred as Summer Torres in the Netflix original series Surviving Summer. She also released the single "P.O.S." that year.

Katz was cast in One Stupid Thing in December 2023.

She is bisexual and was previously in a relationship with her Surviving Summer co-star Savannah La Rain.

== Filmography ==
=== Film ===
Year	Title	Role	Notes
2024	The Imaginary	Emily	Voice; English dub
TBA	One Stupid Thing †	Violet	Post-production
2026	The Florist †	Layla	Completed
TBA	My New Friend Jim †	TBA	Filming

=== Television ===
Year	Title	Role	Notes
2017	Home & Family	Herself	
2017–2021, 2023	Raven's Home	Tess O'Malley	Main role (seasons 1–4); special guest star (season 6)
2020	Bunk'd	Tess O'Malley	Episode: "Raven About Bunk'd: Part 2"
2022–2023	Surviving Summer	Summer Torres	Main role

== Discography ==
=== As lead artist ===
Title	Year	Peak chart positions						
"For Da Summer"	2017	—	—	—	—	—	—	—
"Fall Back"	2018	—	—	—	—	—	—	—
"Like This" (featuring Lil Tjay)	2019	—	—	—	—	—	—	—
"Saucy"	2019	—	—	—	—	—	—	—
"Crushin"	2020	—	—	—	—	—	—	—
"Breakup Song"	2022	—	—	—	—	—	—	—
"P.O.S."	2022	—	—	—	—	—	—	—

=== As featured artist ===
Title	Year	Peak chart positions						
"Who You Are" (Jules LeBlanc featuring Sky Katz)	2019	—	—	—	—	—	—	—

== Awards and nominations ==
Year	Award	Category	Recipient	Result	Ref.
2021	Daytime Emmy Awards	Outstanding Principal Performance in a Children's Program	Raven's Home	Nominated	
