= The Florist =

- Release poster
- Directed by: Babak Najafi
- Written by: Eran Creevy; Scott Windhauser
- Produced by: Jordan Dykstra; Gabriel Georgiev; Jina Panebianco; Latavius Powell; Ceasar Richbow; Ellen S. Wander
- Starring: Jean Reno; Dennis Quaid; Sky Katz
- Production companies: CaliWood Pictures; Film Bridge International; Midwest
- Distributed by: Saban Films
- Release dates: September 24, 2026 (Russia); October 9, 2026 (United States)
- Running time: 97 minutes
- Country: United States
- Language: English
- Box office: $34,942

The Florist is a 2026 American action thriller film directed by Babak Najafi, written by Eran Creevy and Scott Windhauser, and starring Jean Reno, Dennis Quaid and Sky Katz.

== Cast ==
- Jean Reno as Charlie
- Dennis Quaid as Carl Rikker
- Sky Katz as Layla
- Anna Schafer
- Leonidas Gulaptis as Woodrock
- Dylan Flashner as Detective Hutton

== Production ==
In March 2025, it was announced that Jean Reno and Dennis Quaid were cast in the film and that Kiefer Sutherland was initially attached to the project.

In May 2025, it was announced that filming had wrapped in New York and New Jersey.

== Release ==
The film was first released in Russia on September 24, 2026, before Saban Films released the film on digital in the United States on October 9, 2026.
