= I Rock =

Television series

- Genre: Situation comedy
- Created by: Rob Macdonald; David Fedirchuk; Josh Mapleston
- Directed by: Rob Macdonald
- Starring: Josh Mapleston; Pat Ommundson; Kate Sherman; Jeremy Keast; Alison Bell; Ashley Fitzgerald; Mark Pound
- Country of origin: Australia
- Original language: English
- No. of seasons: 1
- No. of episodes: 8

Production
- Producers: Rob Macdonald and David Fedirchuk
- Production locations: Sydney, New South Wales
- Editor: Christopher Spurr
- Running time: 30 minutes

Original release
- Network: ABC2
- Release: 3 May – 21 June 2010

I Rock is an eight-part, half-hour Australian comedy / drama television series which first screened on ABC2 from 3 May 2010.

== Plot ==
Nash Taylor (Josh Mapleston and his struggling indie pub rock band, Boy Crazy Stacey are trying to make it big on the Australian music scene. After numerous support gigs that don't lead to headline shows, they want to take the band to the next level. But the band faces several obstacles – no money, no record deal and Nash's younger brother manages the band. Then Nash falls in love.

== Cast ==
=== Main / recurring ===
- Josh Mapleston as Nash Taylor
- Mark Pound as Jasper Taylor
- Ashley Fitzgerald as Comet
- Jeremy Keast as Luke
- Alison Bell as Jane
- Pat Ommundson as Val
- Kate Sherman as Cara
- Dani Swan as Sasha & Choreographer
- Peter Kowitz as Andy Bang

=== Guests ===
- Bianca Bradey as Jennifer
- Tim Rogers
- Laura Imbruglia
- Cassette Kids
- Snob Scrilla
- The Lovetones
- Scott Dooley
- Maz Compton
- Rob Carlton
- Jason Whalley from Frenzal Rhomb
- Tim Rogers from You Am I
- Scott Dooley

== Production ==
The series was written by Josh Mapleston with David Fedirchuk and Rob Macdonald, produced by David Fedirchuk and Rob Macdonald and directed by Rob Macdonald.

Filming began on 17 August 2009. It was shot in the pub scene of the Inner West suburbs of Sydney.

== Release ==
The series began airing on ABC2 on 3 May 2010, with the last episode airing on 21 June of the same year.

Season 1 was released on DVD on 1 July 2010.

== Episodes ==
=== Season 1 (2010) ===
No.	Title	Directed by	Written by	Original release date
1	"Sgt. Pepper’s Lonely Hearts Club Band"	Rob Macdonald	Josh Mapleston	3 May 2010
2	"The Clash"	Rob Macdonald	Josh Mapleston and David Fedirchuk	10 May 2010
3	"Highway To Hell"	Rob Macdonald	Josh Mapleston and Rob Macdonald	17 May 2010
4	"Band on the Run"	Rob Macdonald	Josh Mapleston	24 May 2010
5	"Fun House"	Rob Macdonald	Josh Mapleston and David Fedirchuk	31 May 2010
6	"Goodbye Yellow Brick Road"	Rob Macdonald	Josh Mapleston	7 June 2010
7	"Nevermind"	Rob Macdonald	Josh Mapleston and Rob Macdonald	14 June 2010
8	"Beggar's Banquet"	Rob Macdonald	Josh Mapleston	21 June 2010

== International broadcasters ==
Country	Network	Notes	Ref
Albania	ALSAT	Aired Late 2010	

== See also ==
- List of Australian television series
- List of programs broadcast by ABC (Australian TV network)
