= Georgina Haig =

Australian actress (born 1985)

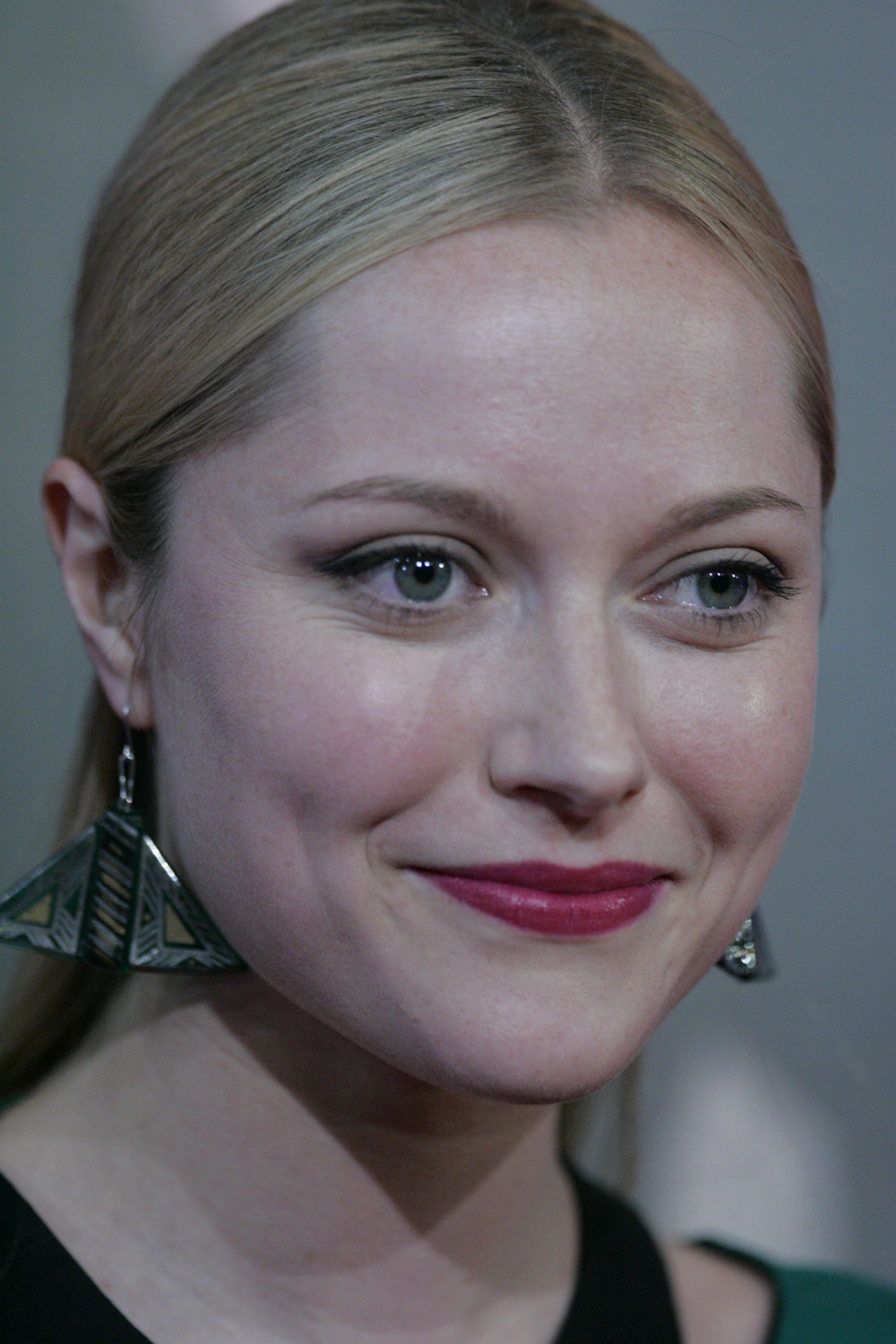
- Haig in 2013
- Born: 3 August 1985 (age 41); Melbourne, Victoria, Australia
- Education: Western Australian Academy of Performing Arts
- Occupation: Actress
- Years active: 2008–present
- Spouse: Josh Mapleston (m. 2014)
- Children: 2
- Father: Russell Hagg

Georgina Haig (born 3 August 1985) is an Australian actress, known for her roles in American television series Once Upon a Time, Fringe, Limitless, Snowpiercer and Archive 81 and Australian films Late Night with the Devil, The Mule, Wasted on the Young and The Sapphires.

== Early life and education ==
Haig was born in Melbourne, Victoria, Australia, to Gillian Haig, a fine artist, and Russell Hagg, an Australian script writer and film maker, whose credits include BMX Bandits, The Cup, Cash and Company and Blue Heelers. Her father was 47 when she was born. Her younger brother is actor, model and singer-songwriter Julian Haig. She grew up on the Mornington Peninsula, in the suburb of Red Hill and her parents separated when she was a teenager.

Haig frequented theatre productions with her father, piqueing her interest in acting. Throughout her early youth she also studied ballet, obtaining Grade 8 with the Royal Academy of Dance in 2001. Haig attended Red Hill Consolidated School and then Toorak College for her high school education. Her drama teacher in years 11 and 12, introduced her to Chekhov and Lecoq, instilling in her a great respect for drama.

Haig studied a summer course at National Institute of Dramatic Art (NIDA) at the age of 17, on recommendation from actress Bridie Carter. She was accepted into the University of Melbourne to study Arts but deferred for one year to teach English in Vietnam at the Hanoi University of Science and Technology with Lattitude Global Volunteering. She then returned to Melbourne to pursue her studies and was accepted in the Western Australian Academy of Performing Arts to study acting, from which she graduated in 2008.

== Career ==
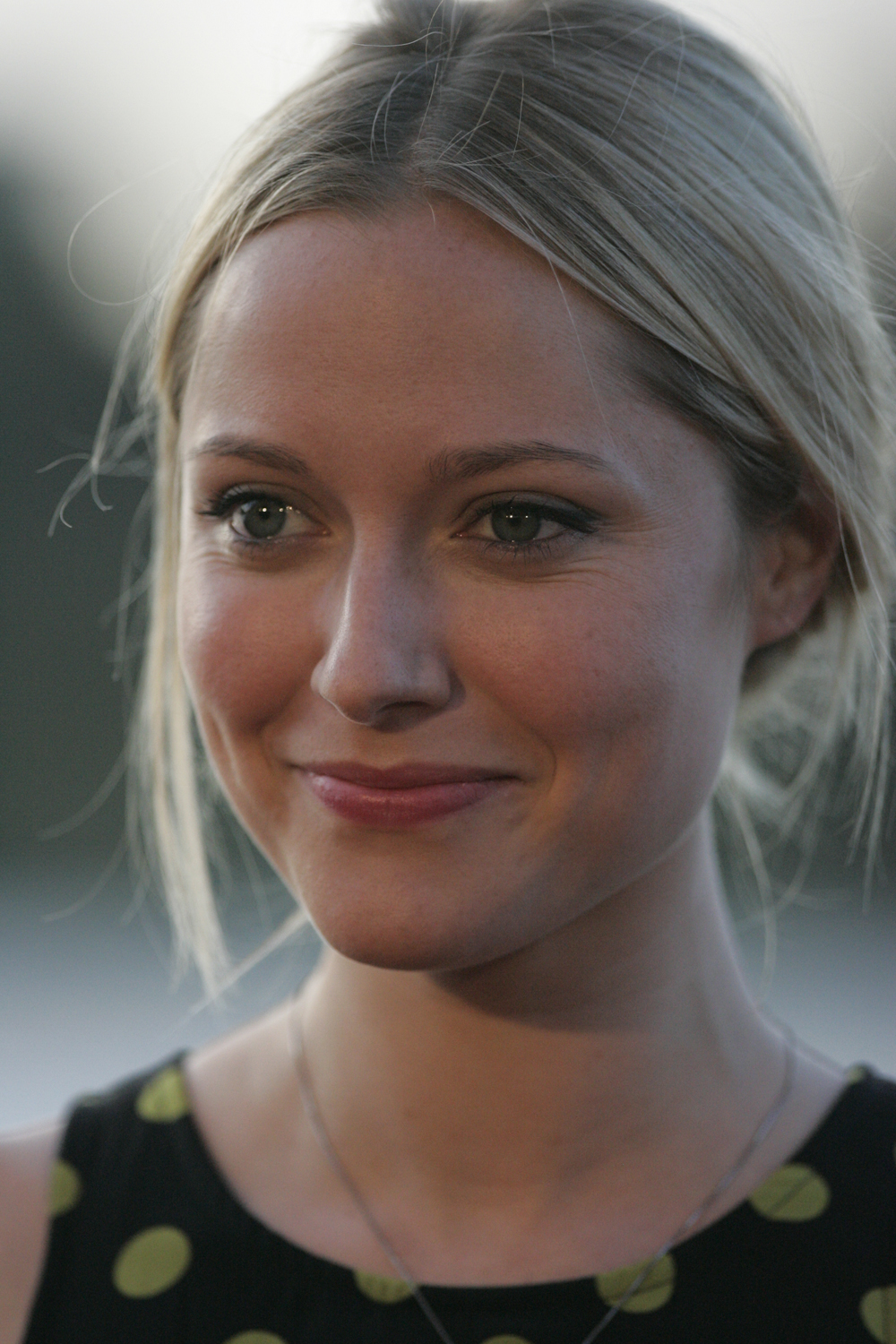
Haig in 2013

In her first year out of drama school, Haig scored her debut role in Underbelly: A Tale of Two Cities, the second season of crime drama Underbelly. She also starred in the second season of children's television series The Elephant Princess, playing the role of Zamira. In 2010, she also landed lead roles in two Australian feature films, Wasted on the Young and Road Train.

In 2011, Haig starred in noir thriller film Crawl, in the lead role of barmaid Marilyn Burns. She won a Best Actress award at LA's Screamfest Horror Film Festival for her performance. She was considered for the role of Andromeda in the film Wrath of the Titans alongside several other actresses. The part ultimately went to Rosamund Pike. Haig was also considered for the role of Gwen Stacy in the 2012 film The Amazing Spider-Man, but lost the part to Emma Stone.

In 2012, she appeared as Glynnis in internationally acclaimed Australian film The Sapphires, an adaptation of the stage musical of the same name. The same year, she made her US acting debut on the FOX science-fiction legal drama Fringe, as Henrietta 'Etta' Bishop. She appeared in Dance Academy as Mistii and had a guest role as Patience in an episode of comedy series A Moody Christmas.

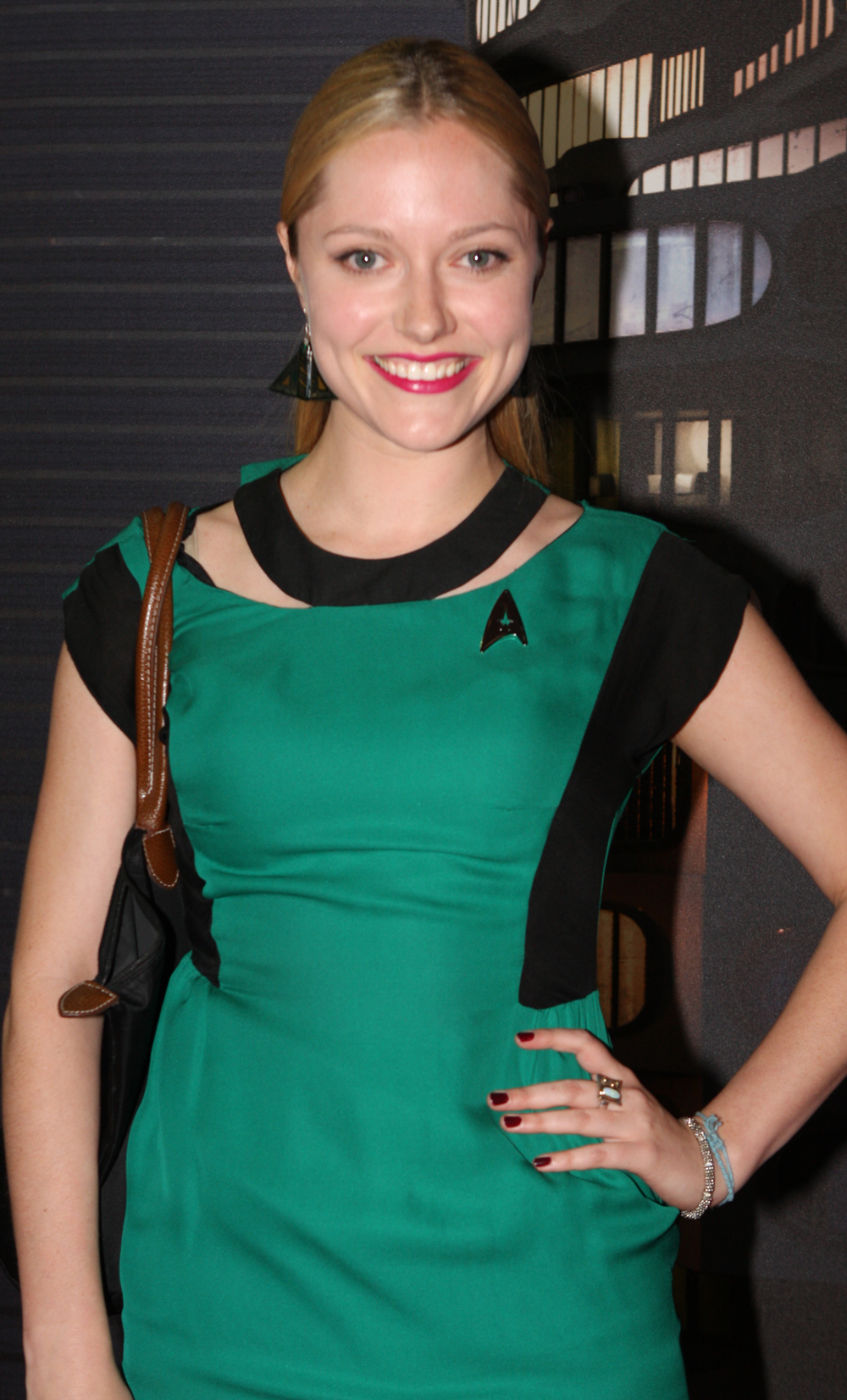
Haig at the premiere of Star Trek Into Darkness in 2013

Haig began 2013 with work on the sketch comedy show The Elegant Gentleman's Guide to Knife Fighting, playing a variety of characters. She then secured the lead role of Lee Anne Marcus in the CBS legal drama Reckless, where she played a police officer caught up in corruption at the Charleston, South Carolina Police Department. During that year she played the rock journalist Paula Yates in the miniseries INXS: Never Tear Us Apart, and defence lawyer Jasmine Griffiths in the black comedy The Mule, alongside Hugo Weaving, Angus Sampson, Leigh Whannell and Noni Hazlehurst.

She worked with Australian comedian Lawrence Leung and husband Josh Mapleston on ABC Australia's farcical kung-fu comedy Maximum Choppage in 2014, playing the role of mayor's daughter Elle. Later that year she secured the much coveted role of Queen Elsa in the fourth season of Once Upon a Time.

In July 2015, Haig was cast in Syfy futuristic pilot Incorporated, but the role was later recast with Allison Miller. In November 2015, it was announced that Haig would have a recurring role alongside Bradley Cooper and Jake McDorman in the first season of CBS crime drama Limitless. She starred as Annabel in Childhood's End, a Syfy three-part miniseries, based on a story by Arthur C. Clarke. In March 2016, she was cast as the female lead in The CW's Untitled Mars Project pilot.

In 2019, Haig played winemaker Olivia in drama miniseries Secret Bridesmaids' Business. In March 2020, it was announced Haig would replace Jessica Marais as Rachel Rafter in Back to the Rafters, a sequel series to Packed to the Rafters. She played seamstress Emilia on Netflix's Snowpiercer opposite Sean Bean, but was unable to complete her story due to the COVID-19 pandemic.

In 2022, Haig played wealthy socialite Iris Vos in Netflix series Archive 81 and appeared alongside David Dastmalchian in Colin and Cameran Cairns' documentary-style horror film Late Night with the Devil as the late Madeline Delroy, lead character Jack’s wife.

Haig's debut short film Ashes was made in 2023, in which she starred as Frances and was also writer, director and producer on the project. The film was honoured with an AACTA nomination for Best Short Film in 2024.

== Personal life ==
Haig met her husband, screenwriter and actor Josh Mapleston, in her first year out of drama school, at the age of 24, when they were both living in Sydney. In June 2014, they were married, and in March 2017, their daughter Greta was born.

After having lived in Sydney and overseas in Los Angeles for work, Haig relocated to the Mornington Peninsula in 2021, with her husband and daughter while filming Packed to the Rafters, moving in with her mother in Dromana. She then bought a house in the area.

After Haig's father died in 2022, she wrote, directed and starred in short film Ashes, inspired by her relationship with him.

In February 2024, Haig revealed that she was pregnant with her second child – a boy – together with Mapleston.

== Filmography ==
=== Film ===
| Year | Title | Role | Notes |
|---|---|---|---|
| 2008 | Iris | Chloe | Short film |
| 2008 | Lost & Found | Louisa | Short film |
| 2010 | Lest We Forget | Cheryl | Short film |
| 2010 | Road Kill | Liz | |
| 2010 | Wasted on the Young | Simone | |
| 2011 | Recon 6 | Christine | Short film |
| 2011 | Crawl | Marilyn Burns | |
| 2012 | The Sapphires | Glynnis | |
| 2013 | Nerve | Grace | |
| 2014 | The Mule | Jasmine Griffiths | |
| 2019 | Where We Disappear | Anastasia | |
| 2023 | Late Night with the Devil | Madeleine Delroy | |
| 2023 | Ashes | Frances | Short film |

=== Television ===
| Year | Title | Role | Notes |
|---|---|---|---|
| 2009–2010 | Underbelly | Georgina Freeman | Recurring role; 6 episodes |
| 2010 | Rescue: Special Ops | Emma Griffiths | Recurring role; 3 episodes |
| 2011 | The Elephant Princess | Zamira | Regular role; 26 episodes |
| 2012 | Dance Academy | Mistii | Recurring role; 3 episodes |
| 2012 | Fringe | Henrietta "Etta" Bishop | Recurring role; 6 episodes |
| 2012 | A Moody Christmas | Patience | Episode: "Water Under the Bridge" |
| 2013 | The Elegant Gentleman's Guide to Knife Fighting | Various characters | Main role; 6 episodes |
| 2014 | INXS: Never Tear Us Apart | Paula Yates | Miniseries |
| 2014 | Reckless | Lee Anne Marcus | Main role; 13 episodes |
| 2014 | Once Upon a Time | Elsa | Recurring role; 12 episodes |
| 2015 | Maximum Choppage | Elle | Main role; 6 episodes |
| 2015 | Childhood's End | Annabel Stormgren | Miniseries |
| 2016 | Limitless | Piper Baird | Recurring role; 4 episodes |
| 2018 | The Crossing | Dr. Sophie Forbin | Main role; 9 episodes |
| 2018 | Radio Silence | Jill Peterman | TV movie |
| 2019 | Secret Bridesmaids' Business | Olivia | Miniseries |
| 2021 | Snowpiercer | Emilia | Recurring role; 4 episodes |
| 2021 | Back to the Rafters | Rachel Rafter | Main role; 6 episodes |
| 2022 | Archive 81 | Iris Vos | Recurring role; 3 episodes |
| 2023–2025 | NCIS: Sydney | Ana Niemus | 4 episodes |
