= Ursula (The Little Mermaid) =

Fictional character from Disney's The Little Mermaid

- The Little Mermaid character
- First appearance: The Little Mermaid (1989)
- Created by: Ron Clements; John Musker
- Based on: The Sea Witch by Hans Christian Andersen
- Voiced by: Pat Carroll (1989–2022) (Note: When Ursula's necklace was broken by Scuttle, and Ariel's voice was returned to her owner, and Ursula was still in her human form, Ursula spoke a few sentences that were voiced by Pat Carroll.) (Note: The 1989 film was the only appearance that Ursula was voiced by Jodi Benson, because in the 1989 film, Ursula turned into a human and used Ariel's voice; in other appearances, since Ursula doesn't have Ariel's voice anymore, when she turns into a human, Jodi Benson isn't her voice actress.); Jodi Benson (as Vanessa; uncredited; 1989 film); Whoopi Goldberg (Descendants 2); Dawnn Lewis (Welcome to the Club); Debra Wilson (Disney Speedstorm; 2024–present); Amber Riley (Ariel)
- Portrayed by: Sherie Rene Scott (2007 musical); Jinky Llamanzares (2011 musical); Queen Latifah (The Little Mermaid Live!); Melissa McCarthy (2023 film); Jessica Alexander (as Vanessa; 2023 film)

In-universe information
- Aliases: The Sea Witch; Vanessa (human alter-ego)
- Species: Cecaelia; Human (via magical transformation)
- Occupation: Sorceress; Faustian bargainer; Queen of Atlantica (temporarily)
- Affiliation: Disney Villains
- Family: Unnamed mother (deceased); Morgana (younger sister); King Triton (older brother in some media); Uliana (younger sister; Descendants: The Rise of Red)
- Children: Uma (daughter; Descendants)
- Relatives: Attina, Alana, Adella, Aquata, Arista, Andrina, and Ariel (nieces in some media)
- Nationality: Atlantican
- Pet(s): Flotsam and Jetsam

Ursula is a fictional character and the main antagonist of Disney Animation's film The Little Mermaid (1989). Voiced by American actress Pat Carroll, Ursula is a manipulative and ruthless Cecaelian sea witch who offers mermaid princess Ariel a temporary opportunity to become human so that she may earn the love of Prince Eric within three days. However, Ursula is determined to sabotage Ariel's chances in order to usurp King Triton's position as ruler of the oceans.

Created by directors and screenwriters Ron Clements and John Musker, Ursula is based on the sea witch in the 1837 fairy tale "The Little Mermaid" by Hans Christian Andersen. However, unlike the character's minor role in the fairy tale, Ursula's role was greatly expanded into a much more prominent villain for the film. Disney had struggled to cast Ursula for a year, during which the role was highly sought after by several coveted television actresses at the time. Clements and Musker disagreed with lyricist Howard Ashman about who should voice the character. While the directors had written the role with Bea Arthur in mind, Ashman intended to offer it to soap opera star Joan Collins; both actresses rejected the part. When Ashman cast his second choice, Broadway actress Elaine Stritch, as Ursula, the two disagreed about how Ursula's song "Poor Unfortunate Souls" should be performed, and Pat Carroll was finally hired to replace Stritch after Ashman fired her.

Deepening her own voice for the role, Carroll based her performance on a combination of Shakespearean actresses and car salespeople. Animated by Ruben A. Aquino, Ursula's original design was inspired by several different sea creatures, including manta rays and scorpion fish, before Clements finally decided to base the character on an octopus; her number of tentacles was reduced from eight to six for financial reasons. Ursula's appearance was also inspired by American actor, singer, and drag queen Divine.

When The Little Mermaid was first released in 1989, Ursula was immediately embraced as one of Disney's best villains and continues to be ranked highly among the studio's greatest by the media. Praised for being humorous and frightening, the character has garnered positive reviews from film critics, some of whom dubbed her Disney's strongest villain in decades. Meanwhile, Carroll's performance has continued to garner acclaim, to the point that the role has eclipsed her previous body of work, ultimately becoming virtually synonymous with the character.

== Development ==
=== Conception and writing ===
At the behest of Disney executives Michael Eisner and Jeffrey Katzenberg, director and screenwriter Ron Clements was among several film-makers instructed to research new story ideas that could potentially be adapted into the studio's next major animated film release. Clements first discovered Hans Christian Andersen's classic fairy tale "The Little Mermaid" at a local bookstore, and began deliberating why Disney had never attempted to adapt the story before. Clements eventually learned that Walt Disney himself had actually attempted to adapt the fairy tale into a feature-length animated film as early as the 1930s, but the project was ultimately shelved due in part to its sad ending. Clements suggested "The Little Mermaid" to Katzenberg, who finally greenlit it after having first rejected it.

Hardly present in Andersen's original story, the sea witch is not a prominent character and lacks a proper name. Among Clements' ideas to alter the story, the film-maker decided to "make the witch more of a villain", describing Ursula as "a fun character to develop" into such. In Andersen's tale, the sea witch is not a villainess as much as she is "a disreputable mermaid." JR Thorpe of Bustle agreed that, in Andersen's story, "The sea witch isn't the enemy". Instead, "human ... nature is." While the original sea witch is willing to help the little mermaid despite the fact that she openly disagrees with her motives, Ursula is only interested in helping Ariel in the hopes of ultimately overthrowing her father. Emma James of Teen Ink observed that in addition to giving the character the name "Ursula", the studio "changed her role as a catalyst in the tale, and morphed her actions into those of an antagonist." Unlike the sea witch, Ursula deliberately intervenes in an attempt to keep the mermaid from success.

Lyricist, producer and writer Howard Ashman had originally envisioned Ursula's relationship with King Triton as a soap opera, and thus drew inspiration from soap opera actress Joan Collins. Ursula was originally conceived as Triton's sister, which would have naturally made the character Ariel's aunt, but the idea was ultimately abandoned. However, their blood relationship is still vaguely alluded to when the character mentions a time during which she actually lived in Triton's palace. Clements and Musker had originally intended for Ursula to remain her original size at the end of the film. However, Katzenberg had just recently seen the film Die Hard (1988), which inspired him to request a "bigger" ending for The Little Mermaid, and thus he instructed the writers to have Ursula grow much larger in size during her climactic fight with Ariel and Eric.

=== Voice and music ===
Pat Carroll was the voice actress of Ursula from 1989 to her death in 2022, with her final role as Ursula being posthumous in Disney Dreamlight Valley. Carroll was not the filmmakers' first choice for the role; Clements, Musker and Ashman had long debated who should voice the villainess, the casting of whom was long and tedious, spanning an entire year. In his book Makin' Toons: Inside the Most Popular Animated TV Shows and Movies, author Allan Neuwirth documented that the filmmakers searched "for just the right performer who could put across the deep-voiced, world-weary, deadpan villainess they had in mind–but never quite snaring their catch". While Ashman was interested in actress Joan Collins because he was a fan of her performance as Alexis Colby in the soap opera Dynasty, Clements and Musker favored actress Bea Arthur, for whom they had actually written the role, describing Ursula as "having a Bea Arthur-type basso voice" in early drafts of their screenplay. Clements and Musker fully expected Arthur to accept the role because she had already been working for Disney's Touchstone Television on the sitcom The Golden Girls. However, Arthur's agent resented the directors-writers for insinuating that her client voice a witch, refusing to even present the script to the actress.

With Arthur eliminated, Clements and Musker were forced to audition several other popular television actresses of the decade, including Nancy Marchand, Charlotte Rae and Roseanne Barr, the last of whom had originally auditioned for the supporting role of chambermaid Carlotta. Amused by her nasal voice, Howard invited the comedian to read for Ursula, but concluded that her approach was ultimately not suitable for the character. Jazz singer Nancy Wilson also auditioned. Jennifer Saunders auditioned too but was turned down, though her audition tape survived and was somehow found by Steven Spielberg in 2002, which led him to insist Andrew Adamson, Kelly Asbury and Conrad Vernon to cast her as the scheming Fairy Godmother in Shrek 2 (2004). Meanwhile, Ashman himself had been similarly unsuccessful in recruiting Collins because Dynasty producer Aaron Spelling feared that the actress' reputation would be jeopardized should she voice an animated character. Thus, Ashman pursued Broadway veteran Elaine Stritch, of whom he had been a long-time fan. The audition process for Ursula required each hopeful to both recite a scene from the film and perform a Broadway-style song of their choice. The finalists became Clements and Musker's Rae versus Ashman's Stritch, the latter of whom ultimately won the role over Rae with her preferred rendition of Ursula's song "Poor Unfortunate Souls". Musker described Stritch's approach to Ursula as "an eccentric, loopy reading". However, Stritch and Ashman soon began to experience creative differences over "Poor Unfortunate Souls" because the actress refused to follow the lyricist's "very specific directions". After refusing to perform the song at Ashman's preferred tempo (combined with her alcoholism), the songwriter fired Stritch from the project, thus forcing Clements and Musker to find a replacement with yet another round of auditions.

Carroll first learned of The Little Mermaid from her agent, and immediately agreed to audition for Ursula because she had always wanted to voice a Disney character. However, the actress felt that her chances were slim to none upon realizing that her competition largely consisted of famous film and television actresses. Musker described Carroll's audition approach as a hybrid of actors Maurice Evans and Tallulah Bankhead. Although confident in both her acting and singing auditions, Carroll did not hear back from her agent about the role until a year afterward, by which time she had already forgotten she had ever auditioned. Upon being cast, Carroll was entirely committed to the role, giving it complete precedence over all other jobs and projects at the time. Carroll's first task was to record "Poor Unfortunate Souls", her approach to which was remarkably different than Stritch's, first asking Howard to demonstrate exactly how he would like her to perform the song before attempting it. Carroll completely credits Ashman with her delivery, explaining, "I got the whole attitude from him ... and his shoulders would twitch a certain way, and his eyes would go a certain way ... I got more about that character from Howard singing that song than from anything else." Carroll also borrowed Ursula's habit of saying "innit" instead of "isn't it" from Ashman. Despite their strong working relationship, Carroll described working with Ashman and composer Alan Menken as a "brutal" experience because of the songwriters' "military" approach; she would often return home from recording sessions with blown vocal cords. After complaining to her about one of her recording sessions, Carroll recalled her daughter, filmmaker Tara Karsian, reassuring her that "you're in something that fifty years from now may be shown ... What you're working on now will be seen by our children, and our grandchildren, and our great-grandchildren". Describing her own performance as Shakespearean, Carroll perceived Ursula as an "ex-Shakespearean actress who now sold cars", which inspired her dry, theatrical interpretation. Carroll also deepened her own voice for the role. When Carroll watched the completed film for the first time, she was frightened by her own performance, comparing it to actress Margaret Hamilton's performance as the Wicked Witch of the West in the film The Wizard of Oz (1939). Actress Jodi Benson, who voices Ariel, briefly provides the uncredited voice of "Vanessa", Ursula's beautiful human alter-ego, in lieu of Carroll.

On June 28, 2019, it was announced that Melissa McCarthy was in talks to play Ursula in the live-action remake of The Little Mermaid, directed by Rob Marshall. On February 18, 2020, McCarthy confirmed her casting as the villainess during an interview on The Ellen DeGeneres Show: “I play Ursula, the sea witch. It is so fun, we're just in rehearsals. It's been an absolute blast. Stepping into the world of Rob Marshall, it's like a fever dream, I just went to London for a week, I was like, ‘I don't get to go to dance camp for a week.’ All day he's like, ‘Do you want to slide down this 40-foot clamshell?’ I'm like, ‘Yes! Of course, I do. What are you, crazy?’ It's been wildly creative.” In December 2020, McCarthy stated that she would hopefully begin filming the movie in January 2021. McCarthy eventually began filming her scenes in April 2021. Later that year, McCarthy described the experience of playing Ursula as "glorious" and adding, "The world of Disney and (director) Rob Marshall is a world that I wish everyone could experience because it's so creative, kind and lovely. Going to singing class every day ... I got to record with an orchestra, which is a mind-bender for someone who is not a singer ... but it was such a fun process. It's going to be incredible ... To me, Ursula is everything. She's one of my absolute favorite villains so to play her was delicious."

Jessica Alexander played Vanessa, Ursula's beautiful human alter ego. Alexander was announced to have been cast on March 1, 2021. She described her character as "a seductress, a temptress, the definition of a femme fatale and a sexy female villain". Of her casting, Marshall stated it was a conscious decision to cast a relatively unknown actress as Vanessa since McCarthy was already portraying Ursula. He also said: "She's just a beautiful, beautiful actress, and she went there. It's sort of rare for someone that beautiful and charismatic to be able to then turn into the sea witch literally in front of you and just lose it. It was exciting to see that change." Alexander enjoyed playing the role, commenting that she "love[s] being demonic, and just going crazy on screen, so this was a perfect opportunity for that". Comic Book Resources wrote that "Alexander's Vanessa is callous and conniving ... [she] takes the opportunity to go all-out, unleashing her villainous side in her final scene." Kacey Musgraves was also considered for the role.

=== Design ===
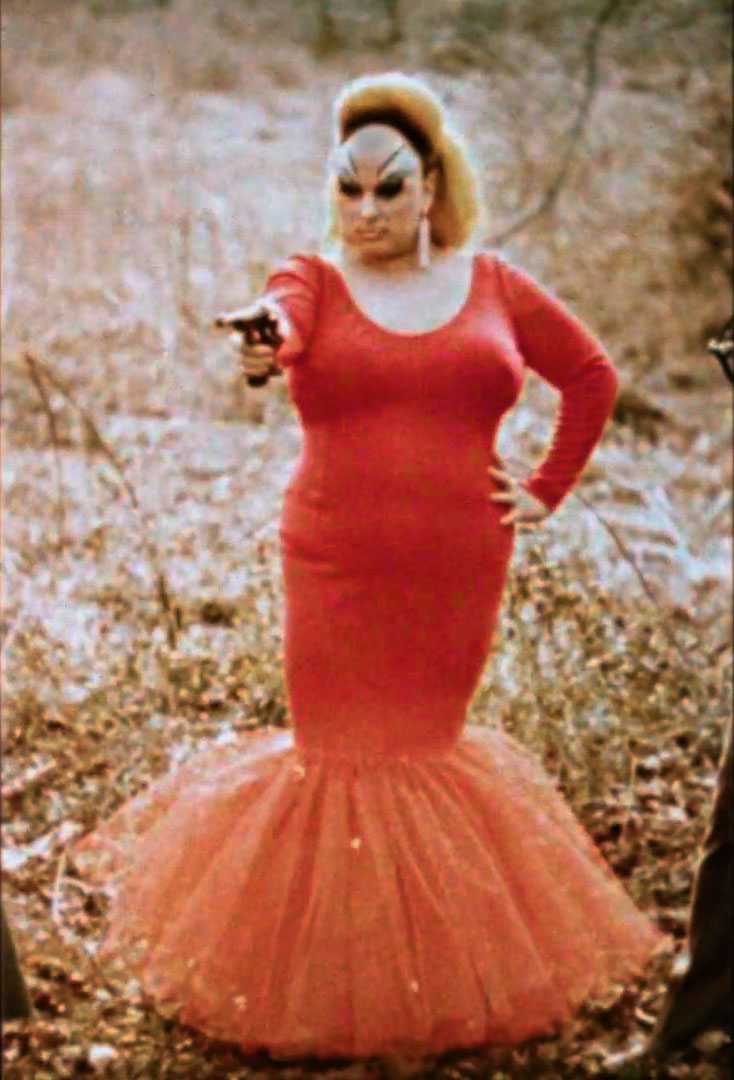
Ursula's character in The Little Mermaid was inspired by the drag queen Divine.

During production of The Little Mermaid, Ursula's design evolved and transformed dramatically. Animator Glen Keane's earliest sketches of Ursula were drawn to resemble Rae, specifically based on the actress' audition for the role. The short-lived casting of Stritch as Ursula and her subsequent performance eventually inspired the animators to design the character as "a tall, thin regal-looking sea witch" based on manta rays and scorpion fish, complete with a long cape. At one point, Ursula had also been drawn with spikes to resemble a spinefish. Ursula's appearance was largely inspired by American actor and drag queen Divine, who was best known for his frequent appearances in several films directed by filmmaker John Waters. Similarities were first drawn between the character and the actor after animator Rob Minkoff sketched "a vampy overweight matron", to which Ashman responded, "She looks like a Miami Beach matron ... playing Mah Jong by the pool.” The character shares Divine's signature eye makeup, jewelry and body type while originally sporting a Mohawk and tattoos, the mohawk was borrowed from the actor's Female Trouble (1974) character Dawn Davenport. However, Minkoff had been drawing the character with a shark's tail at the time. Clements eventually decided to place Ursula's head on top of the body of an octopus instead, which ultimately resulted in her current design. The animators then studied the way in which octopuses move, explaining, "There was a very kind of seductive and yet scary aspect", which they incorporated into the character's own gait. The Female Trouble-inspired Mohawk and tattooed look was ultimately discarded because Disney felt that it would be "too over-the-top" for the film. Additionally, Ursula's face was also inspired by that of Madame Medusa from Disney's The Rescuers (1977). According to The Gospel according to Disney: Faith, Trust, and Pixie Dust author Mark I. Pinsky, Ursula became "the most grotesque characterization Disney ... have created for a female villain" at that time.

Having animated previous Disney villains, Keane was originally approached to be the supervising animator of Ursula, but declined in favor of animating Ariel because he longed to do something different. Thus, Keane was replaced by Ruben A. Aquino. The character was originally drawn with a full set of eight tentacles similar to a real-life octopus, which were eventually reduced to a more manageable six because the original amount would have been too difficult and costly to animate. According to Carroll, this modification actually makes the character more similar to a squid than an octopus; whether or not Ursula is an octopus continues to be debated among both critics and fans, some of whom believe that the character's pair of arms actually account for the remaining two tentacles. Clements admitted that the character's six tentacles made animating her a challenge nonetheless. Ursula was intentionally designed to instill fear in The Little Mermaid's viewers. Animators studied Monstro from Disney's Pinocchio (1940) in order to animate the character's enlarged self emerging from the sea. Ursula's appearance was also based on that of the character Norma Desmond, who appears in the film Sunset Boulevard (1950). Divine never lived to see his own likeness appear in The Little Mermaid; the actor died in 1988, one year before the film's release. However, his cohorts agree that Divine would have greatly enjoyed Ursula. Documentarian Jeffrey Schwartz joked that the actor would have wanted to play Ursula himself had he known about the character, having once told Waters "When I was young, all I wanted to be was a Disney villain".

== Characterization and themes ==
About.com's David Nusair observed that "There's no limit to how low Ursula will stoop to achieve her goals"; the character often relies on a combination of sorcery and deception to achieve them. "A bargainer of the worst kind", Ursula only agrees to help the less fortunate when she's confident that she can gain something from them in return. Identifying Ursula as Ariel's binary due to the character's experience and authority, Collision of Realities: Establishing Research on the Fantastic in Europe author Lars Schmeink described Ursula as a "more complex and mature character" than Ariel, embodying everything that the mermaid can potentially become. To Ariel, Ursula represents "the matronly image" who "instigate[s] the young princess' epic journey" as she longs to achieve the witch's "sage-like knowledge and power". Ursula teaches Ariel about womanhood, a theme From Mouse to Mermaid: The Politics of Film, Gender, and Culture author Elizabeth Belle noticed is absent in Anderson's story. According to Bell, "Ursula can retrieve Ariel from her destined alliance with patriarchy", observing that the witch actually "teaches Ariel that performance and voice and manifestations" are "liberations of gender". Teen Ink's Emma James believes that Ursula's death ultimately prevents Ariel from experiencing and learning from the consequences of her actions, concluding, "Ariel never really owns up to all the mishap she caused." Observing that Ursula actually warns Ariel about the consequences should she fail to earn a kiss from Eric, Laura Stampler of Time described the character as a "savvy contract negotiator". Writing for Collider, Dave Trumbore identified Ursula as the film's "Crossroads Demon". According to Gary Thompson of the Philadelphia Daily News, Ursula is similar to businesswoman Leona Helmsley.

Makin' Toons: Inside the Most Popular Animated TV Shows and Movies author Allan Neuwirth observed that Ursula obeys Disney's "long-standing tradition of depicting classic scoundrels ... none so unsettling as their female villains." Neuwirth believes that the public's fear of Disney's female villains "stems from our expectations of nurturing, comfort and honesty from our mothers", while Disney's villainnesses, including Ursula, tend to "lust after ... youth and beauty." Ursula even goes as far as transforming herself into a beautiful young woman in order to trick Ariel's love interest into marrying her instead. Janet Wasko believes that Ursula's role as a powerful but antagonistic woman in The Little Mermaid alludes to the idea of patriarchy being preferable to matriarchy. Sophie Hall of Beamly identified Ursula as a woman struggling to "run the kingdom in a man's world, having been kicked out for no specific reason." In her book Emerson Goes to the Movies: Individualism in Walt Disney Company's Post-1989 Animated Films, author Justyna Fruzińska claimed that "the masculine rule of Triton is presented as positive and opposed to the negative, feminine rule of Ursula". Understanding Disney: The Manufacture of Fantasy author Janet Wasko accused the film's treatment of Ursula of "eliminat[ing] many of the female characters and undermin[ing] [the] feminine power" present in Andersen's fairy tale. However, Wasko also argued that Ursula could possibly be considered a mother figure for Ariel; the tunnel of Ursula's cave resembles a vagina, while Ursula's mannerisms evoke those of a mother as she refers to Ariel as "my dear sweet child". Gwynne Watkins of Yahoo! accused Ursula of "assur[ing] Ariel that human men prefer their women to be silent". Meanwhile, in response to feminist critiques of the character, author Amy M. Davis observed in her book Handsome Heroes and Vile Villains: Masculinity in Disney's Feature Films that Ursula is actually responsible for giving Eric the "power to make Ariel permanently human". However, author Alan Dundes in his book Bloody Mary in the Mirror: Essays in Psychoanalytic Folkloristics in conjunction with co-author Lauren Dundes observed that Ursula becomes masculine and deep-voiced once she acquires Triton's trident, implying that even "the only powerful woman in the story fulfills her desire for supreme power by becoming masculine". Dundes and Dundes also observed that Ursula reverts to being feminine once she is impaled.

In her book Tales, Then and Now: More Folktales as Literary Fictions for Young Adults, author Anna E. Altmann compared Ursula to Satan because both Ariel and Triton "sign a contract ... with her"; James Plath of Movie Metropolis described Ursula's contract as "a Mephistophelean bargain." Much like Satan, Ursula was banished from Triton's palace, similar to the way in which Lucifer was exiled from heaven. Felix Vasquez of Cinema Crazed believes that Ursula "is evil just for the sake of being evil". Writing for the Disney Archives, Dave Smith observed that Ursula "has the gross unsubtlety of Ratigan from 'The Great Mouse Detective' but substantially more brio." Describing Ursula as "Bejeweled and lip-pouting like an overweight, over-rich, over-pampered, over-the-top society hostess gone mad," Smith perceived the character as "all flair, flamboyance, and theatricality mixed with a touch of con-artistry", citing wrath as her only genuine emotion. Additionally, Ursula tends to act as though she is performing for an audience. Jay Boyar of the Orlando Sentinel compared the character's appearance to that of evangelist Tammy Faye. At times, Ursula tends to demonstrate stereotypically masculine physical traits. Describing the character as "A campy sea witch with an insatiable thirst for power", Rolling Stone's David Ehrlich believes that Ursula resembles a child of Divine and Donald Trump.

== Appearances ==
=== Films ===
==== The Little Mermaid (1989) ====
Ursula debuted in the 1989 animated film The Little Mermaid (where she is voiced by Pat Carroll), as a sea witch who is scheming to take advantage of the ambitions of Princess Ariel in order to get revenge on King Triton, usurp the throne and turning merpeople into polyps for her garden. When Ariel saves and falls in love with a human prince named Eric much to her father's chagrin, Ursula temporarily grants Ariel's wish to live as a human for three days in return for her voice. If she successfully earns a kiss from Eric by the end of the third day, Ariel will remain human permanently; if she fails, she will turn back into a mermaid and belong to Ursula forever. However, Ursula is determined to sabotage Ariel's and Eric's budding romance at any cost; when she realizes that Ariel and Eric are actually falling in love, Ursula transforms herself into a beautiful young woman named "Vanessa" and hypnotizes Eric, tricking him into agreeing to marry her instead. Ariel manages to thwart Ursula and Eric's wedding. Eric realizes that it was Ariel who saved him when her voice returns to her and is about to kiss her, but as the sun sets Ariel transforms back into a mermaid and is captured by Ursula. Triton confronts Ursula and agrees to give up himself and his magical trident in return for Ariel's freedom. Ursula then uses the trident to expand into monstrous proportions and attempts to kill Ariel and Eric, but Eric manages to impale Ursula with the splintered bowsprit of a wrecked ship, and she dies. With Ursula gone, her powers cease, the merpeople turn back to normal, Triton's power is restored, and Ariel marries Eric once she is permanently transformed into a human.

==== The Little Mermaid 2: Return to the Sea ====
Due to her death in the original film, Ursula does not appear in the direct-to-video sequel The Little Mermaid II: Return to the Sea, but she is mentioned many times, mostly by her younger sister Morgana (also voiced by Pat Carroll). Her image does appear in a photograph that Morgana has of Ursula. In the family portrait during the cut song "Gonna Get My Wish", Ursula was also depicted as a young girl with light green skin similar to Morgana and their mother.

==== Descendants 2 ====
Ursula makes an appearance in the 2017 television film Descendants 2, voiced by Whoopi Goldberg. Twenty years prior to the film, Ursula was banished on the Isle of the Lost with other villains. In the film, her daughter Uma (portrayed by China Anne McClain) is the main antagonist. During one scene, Ursula whips her tentacle out from the kitchen of her Fish and Chips shop and yells at Uma to stop singing and come to wash the dishes. While Ursula doesn't appear in other productions of the Descendants franchise, Uma returns in the sequel Descendants 3, while in the spin-off film Descendants: The Rise of Red appears Ursula's younger sister Uliana (portrayed by Dara Reneé).

==== The Simpsons: Welcome to the Club ====
In The Simpsons short Welcome to the Club, Ursula and other Disney villains welcome Lisa Simpson to "Disney Villain Land", and persuade her to become evil. She is voiced by Dawnn Lewis.

==== The Little Mermaid (2023) ====
In Disney's 2023 live-action remake of The Little Mermaid, Ursula was played by Melissa McCarthy.

Ursula appears in The Little Mermaid (2023), portrayed by Melissa McCarthy, while Jessica Alexander portrays her human form Vanessa. Similar to the broadway musical, this version is the estranged younger sister of King Triton and Ariel's aunt.

==== Once Upon a Studio ====
Ursula appears in Once Upon a Studio as part of the Walt Disney Animation Studios characters that appear gathering to take a group photo, voiced by archival recordings of Pat Carroll.

==== Lego Disney Princess: Villains Unite ====
Ursula appears as one of the antagonists in the Lego special for Disney+ Lego Disney Princess: Villains Unite (2025).

=== Television series ===
==== The Little Mermaid ====
Ursula appears as the antagonist in four episodes of The Little Mermaid prequel television series: "Against the Tide", "Tail of Two Crabs", "Heroes" and "Ariel's Treasures". In all four episodes, she executes various plans to antagonize King Triton and take over Atlantica, but all fail.

==== House of Mouse ====
Ursula makes recurring appearances in House of Mouse (2001) as a guest at the eponymous nightclub, with Pat Carroll reprising the role. In the film Mickey's House of Villains, Ursula and Jafar, among other villains, work together to take over the club.

==== Once Upon a Time ====
Two live-action versions of Ursula appear in the ABC television series Once Upon a Time.

===== "The Sea Goddess" =====
Ursula the Sea Goddess appears in the third season, voiced by Yvette Nicole Brown. In the episode "Ariel", she is described as a sea goddess whom no one has seen for a thousand years. According to Ariel, Ursula gave merfolk the ability to gain legs once a year, when the tide is highest. Ariel uses this ability to visit Prince Eric at his castle, where he is having a ball honoring Ursula. Later, the Evil Queen (Lana Parrilla) disguises herself as Ursula to make a deal with Ariel and trick her into capturing Snow White.

===== "The Sea Witch" =====
Ursula the Sea Witch
- Ursula the Sea Witch, in Once Upon a Time
- First appearance: "Heroes and Villains" (Season 4; Episode 12)
- Created by: Edward Kitsis and Adam Horowitz
- Portrayed by: Merrin Dungey; Tiffany Boone (young)

In-universe information
- Species: Mermaid (original); Human (via Magical transformation)
- Gender: Female
- Title(s): The Sea Witch; Queen of Darkness
- Occupation: Sorceress
- Affiliation: Queens of Darkness (formerly)
- Family: Poseidon (father); Unnamed mother (deceased)
- Nationality: Atlantican

Ursula the Sea Witch appears as an antagonist of the second half of the fourth season, where she is portrayed as an adult by Merrin Dungey, and as a teenager by Tiffany Boone.

The episode "Poor Unfortunate Soul" contains flashbacks to Ursula's youth, when she was a teenage mermaid living under the sea with her father King Poseidon (Ernie Hudson). Ursula was gifted with a beautiful voice, which Poseidon wanted her to use to lure pirates to their death, in order to avenge the murder of Ursula's mother at the hands of an unnamed pirate. Ursula refused and instead befriended a pirate, Captain Hook (Colin O'Donoghue), who supported her desire for freedom. Ursula and Hook's friendship fell apart when Hook sealed Ursula's singing voice inside an enchanted shell to punish Poseidon for destroying a weapon Hook wanted for himself. Ursula, angered and disappointed with both merfolk and humans, used Poseidon's trident to transform her tail into tentacles, emulating the ancient sea goddess that she was named after.

The episodes "Heroes and Villains" and "Darkness on the Edge of Town" contain flashbacks to the Enchanted Forest of the past, where Ursula teamed up with fellow witches Maleficent (Kristin Bauer van Straten) and Cruella De Vil (Victoria Smurfit). The three of them worked together to try to defeat the heroes and find their happy endings, but failed. In the episode "Best Laid Plans", while trying to rescue Maleficent's baby from Snow and Charming, Ursula and Cruella fell into a portal that lead into the non-magical world. Three decades later, in modern-day New York, Ursula is working as a cleaner in an aquarium when she is recruited by Rumplestiltskin, who also reunites her with Cruella. Ursula, Cruella and Rumplestiltskin then trick their way into entering the magical town of Storybrooke. In the episode "Unforgiven", they resurrect Maleficent to join their group.

In the present-day plotline of "Poor Unfortunate Soul", a remorseful Hook makes a deal with Ursula to get her singing voice back. They are only successful when Ariel intercedes, bringing Poseidon to Storybrooke so that he and Ursula can reconcile, and the enchantment is broken. Having achieved her happy ending, Ursula tells Hook the full plan Rumplestiltskin has for the heroes, and afterward returns to the sea with her father.

==== The Wonderful World of Mickey Mouse ====
Ursula appears in The Wonderful World of Mickey Mouse episode "Keep on Rollin'", with Pat Carroll reprising the role, where along with Pete and the Beagle Boys confront Mickey Mouse and his friends for being in the skating rink where the characters meet.

==== Ariel ====
Ursula appears in Ariel, voiced by Amber Riley. In the series, she is Ariel's aunt and tutor.

=== Video games ===
- Ursula appears in the Kingdom Hearts series, voiced by Pat Carroll in the English version and Kujira in the Japanese version. This version was King Triton's fortuneteller before she was banished. Ursula is introduced in Kingdom Hearts (2002) and makes subsequent appearances in Kingdom Hearts: Chain of Memories (2004), Kingdom Hearts II (2005), and Kingdom Hearts 3D: Dream Drop Distance (2012).
- Ursula appears in concept art for Epic Mickey.
- Ursula appears as an unlockable playable character in Disney Magic Kingdoms.
- Ursula appears in Disney Dreamlight Valley, voiced posthumously by Pat Carroll.
- Ursula appears as a playable character in Disney Speedstorm, voiced by Debra Wilson.
- In the mobile game Twisted-Wonderland, Ursula is honored and revered as "The Sea Witch," one of "The Great Seven," due to her great compassion to those in need. At the magic school Night Raven College, one of the dorms, Octavinelle, is dedicated to her, and students sorted into this dorm are expected to reflect her spirit of "benevolence". The character Azul Ashengrotto, housewarden of Octavinelle, is the Twisted Wonderland incarnation of Ursula herself, while his signature spell, "It's a Deal" reflects her bargains. Like Ursula, Azul is a cecaelian merman in his original form, but uses potions to gain human legs while attending school on land. Ursula makes an appearance in flashback when the game's protagonist dreams of the events of the first film in Book 3.

=== Theme park attractions ===
Ursula appears in Disney park attractions such as the Fantasmic! show debuted in 1992 at Disneyland Park, as one of the Disney Villains summoned to destroy Mickey Mouse. A massive Ursula Audio-Animatronic appears in The Little Mermaid ~ Ariel's Undersea Adventure, a dark ride at Disney California Adventure, and Magic Kingdom. Ursula is a central character in the annual Halloween-themed fireworks show HalloWishes at the Walt Disney World Magic Kingdom Mickey's Not-So-Scary Halloween Party "hard ticket" event. Ursula also appears at the tail end of the Little Mermaid unit in Walt Disney's Parade of Dreams at Disneyland.

=== Stage ===
==== Broadway musical ====
In the musical version of the original film, Sherie Rene Scott originated the live role, which she played until January 25, 2009. Other actresses who played the role include Heidi Blickenstaff and Faith Prince.

In this version, Ursula is King Triton's sister, a concept for the original film that was eventually dropped. When Ursula and Triton's father died, the pair were given an equal share of the sea plus two magical items. Triton received the trident while Ursula received the magic Nautilus shell. Though the two were meant to rule the seas together, Ursula's greed and use of dark magic to usurp Triton led to her being banished. The desire for revenge and power is her motivation for the show. The musical's plot is similar to the film, with the exception that Ursula doesn't transform into Vanessa, and she is ultimately defeated by Ariel rather than Eric when the mermaid destroys the Nautilus shell that contains Ursula's power. In the revamped version of the musical developed by Glenn Casale in 2012, Ursula and Triton's backstory was changed, making her the youngest of seven sisters like Ariel. Unlike Ariel, she was not a beautiful mermaid like her sisters and was despised and ignored by their father Poseidon while her sisters were adored. She gained the Nautilus shell when Poseidon gave it to her to ease the guilt he felt for how he treated her. Using the shell, Ursula killed all of her sisters and became queen after Poseidon died from a “very rare and lethal flu”. She forgot he had Triton, then only one-year-old, and dismissed him as a threat until he became old enough to depose her and become king. Ursula's motivation for revenge otherwise remains similar to the original book of the musical, with the addition that she was the one who killed Ariel's mother.

In addition to her song from the film, Alan Menken and Glenn Slater wrote new songs for Ursula: "I Want the Good Times Back", which introduces Ursula and her backstory, "I Want the Good Times Back (reprise)", where Ursula orders Flotsam and Jetsam to sabotage Ariel's attempt to get Eric to kiss her, and a reprise of "Poor Unfortunate Souls", where Ursula forces Triton to sign a deal and claims the trident. In the workshop stage, Ursula had a different introductory song: "Wasting Away" where she sings about her suffering in exile after Triton deposed her for using black magic, and its reprise featured Ursula preparing to transform into Vanessa. Emily Skinner provided vocals for Ursula in the workshop. In the 2012 revamped version of the musical, "I Want the Good Times Back" is replaced with a new song, "Daddy's Little Angel".

==== Unfortunate - The Untold Story of Ursula The Sea Witch (2019-present) ====
Ursula becomes the main character in a revisionist parody musical Unfortunate - The Untold Story of Ursula The Sea Witch by Robyn Grant.

==== Other stage productions ====
In 2016, Rebel Wilson performed the role of Ursula at a stripped-down concert version of The Little Mermaid at the Hollywood Bowl, which featured the songs from the film and four songs from the Broadway musical. Wilson was praised for her performance, which was described by The Huffington Post as "pitch perfect".

Queen Latifah portrayed Ursula in the 2019 television special, The Little Mermaid Live! which used a similar format of the live concerts at the Hollywood Bowl, by combining a screening of the film with live accompaniment by guest musicians and celebrities.

=== Literature ===
Ursula has appeared in various Disney Press novels and tie-ins for the franchise. A comic book series, Disney's The Little Mermaid, was released in 1992, revolving around the adventures of Ariel living under the sea as a mermaid. Ursula appears in a few issues, notably "Serpent Teen", which depicts how Ursula obtained the sea serpent carcass that makes her home. My Side of the Story: Ursula (2004) retells the plot of the film from Ursula's point of view, and depicts Ursula having romantic feelings for Triton. The Villain Files (2005) depicts Ursula's youth living in Triton's castle while Ariel was a baby.

Ursula is a main character in the 2016 young adult novel Poor Unfortunate Soul: A Tale of the Sea Witch by Serena Valentino. The novel is the third entry of the "Villains" series, a shared universe that crosses over various theatrical Disney films including Beauty and the Beast, Snow White and the Seven Dwarfs and Sleeping Beauty. In this novel, Ursula is King Triton's younger sister who was betrayed by him as a child for choosing a tentacled form instead of a mermaid's tail, and grew up as a human in the town of Ipswich with an adoptive human father. Ursula returned to the sea when her adopted father was killed by the townsfolk for protecting her, befriending Athena, Queen of Atlantica, but was denied her inheritance by Triton and banished to the shadows. Ursula conspires with three other witches to steal Triton's soul and become ruler of all the seas, but is ultimately defeated.

Ursula is the villain in the 2020 children's horror novel Part of Your Nightmare by Vera Strange, which is the first book of the Disney Chills series. The novel's setting is modern day, in a beach city named Triton Bay where eleven-year-old Shelly Anderson has just moved to a new school. Shelly struggles to fit in and especially wants the approval of Kendall, the popular captain of their school's swim team. Shelly first encounters Ursula at the aquarium owned by the Anderson family, and afterward has sleeping and waking nightmares of Ursula offering her a deal where that Shelly can be the "fastest swimmer ever", if Shelly does her a small favor in return.

==== Poor Unfortunate Soul: A Tale of the Sea Witch ====
Ursula is mentioned and appears in the second book of the Villains series by Serena Valentino, The Beast Within: A Tale of Beauty's Prince, appearing before the Odd Sisters.

She is the main character in the third book. Prior to the events of the book, Ursula appears in the English town of Ipswich and proceeds to inflict pain on the citizens of the town and turn them into twisted sea creatures before being stopped by King Triton. Years later, Ursula, in her guise as Vanessa, goes to the Odd Sisters and asks for their help to defeat Triton, who in the book is Ursula's brother and therefore makes Ursula Ariel's aunt, in exchange for helping them find their sister, Circe. Unknown to the Odd Sisters, Ursula has turned Circe into one of her polyps and is keeping her captive in her cavern.

Initially the Odd Sisters help her, but upon discovering that Ursula is keeping Circe captive, they turn on her and use their magic to influence Eric's ship to impale Ursula and kill her as revenge for keeping Circe captive. Circe is freed after this and discovers Ursula's golden shell. After finding out that her sisters killed Ursula, she banishes them to sleep to keep them from harming anyone else.

In the fourth book Mistress of All Evil: A Tale of the Dark Fairy, Circe and Nanny gather Ursula's remains and give her a burial at sea prior to Maleficent's arrival.

==== Part of Your World: A Twisted Tale ====
The fifth book in the A Twisted Tale series written by author Liz Braswell, it addresses the question "What if Ariel had never defeated Ursula?" In the book Ursula, in her guise as Vanessa, ultimately wed Prince Eric and still possesses Ariel's voice five years later, and uses Eric's connections to go to war with neighboring kingdoms and expand the territory of Eric's kingdom. She maintains a beautiful appearance and a rich lifestyle. She is ultimately overthrown, by Ariel and Eric.

In this book Braswell describes Ursula's species as “cecaelia,” a term created by fans in the late 2000s. This was the first Disney-published work to use the name.

==== Part of Your Nightmare ====
Ursula is the primary antagonist in the first book of the Disney Chills book series titled Part of Your Nightmare, written by author Jennifer Brody under the name of Vera Strange. The book was published on July 7, 2020. In the book, Ursula agrees to make protagonist Shelley more popular at her school. However, Shelley soon discovers that this deal comes with a price, one she may not be willing to pay.

==== Vanessa - Happily Never After ====
Ursula, in her guise as Vanessa, is the main character in a novel titled Vanessa - Happily Never After, written in French by Lorie Langdon. The book was published on January 12, 2022. Disappointed by the sea people who reject her, Ursula, now Vanessa, ventures to land for the first time, where she sets out in search of the ultimate power which will make her so powerful that no one will ever be able to ignore her again. But destiny leads her to André Baros, a simple human with whom she falls in love... Can she really have it all? Love and power? Or will Vanessa have to make a choice?

== Toys ==
Both Ursula and Vanessa have inspired the creation of several toys, most notably fashion dolls, plush dolls and action figures released by Disney Store and more recently by Mattel, Target Corporation and Jakks Pacific depicting both characters in different visual styles, body types and sizes, an interactive version of Ursula's mystical magic cauldron released by Jakks Pacific to coincide with the release of the 2023 live-action film which features lights, sounds, music, and several accessories as well as two versions of Ursula's mysterious magic Nautilus shell necklace. The first one is a colorful, ornate variant with additional decorations which was released as a Disney Store exclusive product in 2019. It includes a light-up feature that activates a recording of Jodi Benson vocalizing as Ariel as well as a voice recording feature. The second one is a simpler, more visually accurate version which was released by Jakks Pacific to coincide with the release of the 2023 live-action film. Like its predecessor, it also includes a light-up feature which activates a recording of Halle Bailey vocalizing as either Ariel or Vanessa.

== Reception ==
=== Critical response ===
Ursula has earned a positive reception from entertainment critics. When The Little Mermaid was first released in 1989, film critics and audiences alike immediately embraced Ursula as one of Disney's best villains, as well as one of the studio's strongest villains in several years. Film critic Roger Ebert dubbed Ursula Disney's "most satisfying villainess since" Snow White and the Seven Dwarfs' Evil Queen, who debuted in 1937. Critics agree that Ursula played an important role in the overall success of The Little Mermaid. Samantha Rullo of Bustle reviewed Ursula as a "way more interesting" character than Ariel herself, while praising her for "rocking the best hair and makeup of any Disney villain." Also writing for Bustle, Caitlyn Callegari appreciated Ursula for "tell[ing] it like it is." Jay Boyar of the Orlando Sentinel hailed Ursula as "A total success" despite sharing some similarities with previous Disney villains. Janet Maslin of The New York Times described Ursula as "a fabulously campy creation embodying the film's well-developed sense of mischief." Describing the character as an "inventive high-camp villainess," the New York Daily News' Kathleen Carroll cited Ursula as a prime example of the film's "outstanding" animation. Hailing the character as "a visual feast," Variety considered Ursula to be among "the film's more inspired inventions."

Actress Pat Carroll and the Ursula animators pump astonishing gobs of rotten-flirty menace and perversity into Witch Ursula, who looks a bit like the late actor Divine pasted over with an evil Jack Nicholson leer and squeezed into a cleavage-popping black evening gown, tailing off startlingly into eight squiggling black octopus tentacles. With her pet moray eels, she is a genuine nightmare, an obese lavender voluptuary peeling off lines like "Life's full of hard choices . . . I'n't it?" with blowzy relish or erupting from the ocean like Moby Dick on bonbons.

— The Los Angeles Times' Michael Wilmington

William Thomas of Empire described Ursula as "truly quake-inducing", while Time's Eliana Dockterman enjoyed the fact that, unlike previous Disney villains, "Ursula doesn't even pretend to be good ... Right off the bat, she owns her evil witchiness". Kilmeny Fane-Saunders, writing for Radio Times, warned parents that Ursula could frighten young children. However, The Huffington Post's Hilary Sheinbau believes that "there are many of these people who walk ... talk and strive among us", concluding, "it's important for kids to know that not everyone is going to look out for their best interests, however tempting some offers may be." Metro's Duncan Lindsay agreed that Ursula teaches children "that binding contracts are a necessary part of every deal. We can thank her for all of our business sense as we are always sure to triple check that paperwork when ... securing deals." Dave Smith of the Disney Archives wrote, "When anger does bring out her true emotion, the effects are staggering. Her look of stark hatred, even while her face is still human, must certainly have brought nightmares to young children. And when she finally changes into a giant, towering up through the waves and over puny mortals, the embodiment of fury is quite breathtaking." Smith concluded, "Earlier we may have chuckled at her villainy; at this moment, there is no laughter ... only genuine fear." Meanwhile, SMOSH's Francesco Marciuliano praised the character as "one of the most gleefully evil characters Disney has ever created."

Carroll's vocal performance as Ursula has been met with similar praise. Michael Wilmington of the Los Angeles Times predicted that the actress "will make [the film] a hit". Roger Hurlburt of the Sun-Sentinel enthused, "If Academy Awards were given for vocal talents, then Pat Carroll ... certainly is deserving." Hurlburt went on to extol Carroll as "a tour de force ... making such previous Disney villainesses -- Cruella de Ville (sic) (101 Dalmatians) and the Evil Queen (Snow White) -- pale in comparison", while the Deseret News' Chris Hicks described her performance as "delightful". To-date, Carroll's interpretation of Ursula remains so respected that it has ultimately eclipsed her previous body of work as an actress, of which she was "most proud" nonetheless, not minding that she was associated with the role almost exclusively. Carroll explained that she would sign autographs "Dear Sweetlips: I hug you with my tentacles. Oceans of love, Ursula.' And then, underneath, in parentheses, I put 'Pat Carroll,' very small" because her fans are more likely to identify with her character than her.

=== Accolades and legacy ===
Revered as a fan favorite, Ursula has established herself as one of Disney's most iconic characters; she is widely regarded as one of the studio's "classic" villains. Author Corey Sandler described Ursula as a popular "anti-favorite" in his book Econoguide Disneyland Resort, Universal Studios Hollywood: And Other Major Southern California Attractions Including Disney's California Adventure. The character's impact as a villainness has ultimately eclipsed those of her predecessors. According to Laura Rosenfeld of Tech Times, Ursula has had the most profound influence out of all animated characters in the Disney canon. The character is considered to be one of the greatest Disney villains of all-time, and continues to be ranked highly on countdown lists compiled by various publications. Ursula topped E!'s Disney villains ranking; author John Boone concluded that "There will never be a Disney villain more wickedly wonderful than" Ursula. Yahoo! Movies ranked Ursula third, praising her "for being the first female Disney baddie to get her own song." On The Huffington Post's "Definitive Ranking Of 25 Classic Disney Villains", Ursula was also ranked third. About.com placed the character at number four in the website's "Top 10 Disney Villains" article. Babble.com ranked the character the fifth greatest Disney villain "From Bad to Worst". Moviefone ranked Ursula seventh on the website's list of the thirty greatest Disney villains of all-time. TVOvermind also ranked Ursula seventh in its article "Ranking the Top 10 Animated Disney Villains". Recognizing Ursula among "8 Disney villains who are better than the heroes", Beamly's Sophie Hall believes that the character "had more charisma than Ariel". By extension, Ursula is also often considered to be among the greatest animated villains of all-time. Sky Movies included the character on the website's list "Despicable Them: Top Animated Villains". The Toronto Sun ranked Ursula the third "top animated [villain] of all time".

Ursula is also considered to be one of Disney's most terrifying villains. Oh My Disney ranked Ursula's line "Triton's daughter will be mine and then I'll make him writhe. I'll see him wriggle like a worm on a hook!" the fifth "Most Sinister Disney Villain Quote". Meanwhile, Rolling Stone included the climactic sequence in which Ursula grows into a giant on the magazine's list of the "12 Scariest Moments in Kids' Films", comparing the sequence to the iconic shower scene in the horror film Psycho (1960), while BuzzFeed ranked the character's death fifth on the website's "Definitive Ranking Of The Most Horrific Disney Villain Deaths". In the wake of the release of Maleficent (2014), a live-action remake of Disney's Sleeping Beauty (1959) told from the perspective of the film's villain, several publications voted for Ursula among Disney villains who deserve to star in their own films, including Yahoo! Movies, MTV, Bustle and the New York Post. David Crow of Den of Geek selected actor John Travolta as his first choice for the role of Ursula because of his drag performance as Edna Turnblad in the film Hairspray (2007), a role originated by Divine, the actor upon whose appearance Ursula's design was based.

Ursula's body type has been positively embraced by the public; the character has since been recognized as a symbol of body positivity. HelloGiggles believes that "Ursula has the most positive body image" out of all of Disney's villainnesses: "She may not be a size zero, like the other villains and heroines, but she's equally as confident. She is sexy, she is glamorous and she shows of her curves with no apology." From 2007 onwards, Disney launched an advertising campaign called Disney Dreams Portraits featuring celebrities dressed up as various Disney characters and photographer Annie Leibovitz; Queen Latifah was photographed as Ursula for this campaign in 2011. In 2012 Disney released a Disney Villain line of dolls and make-up, and its revamped imagery was criticized for "slimming down" of Ursula to make her "marketable" and ignoring body diversity. For Halloween of 2013, Amber Riley portrayed Ursula in a celebrity parody/tribute of "Cell Block Tango" from Chicago titled "Spell Block Tango", directed by Todrick Hall, which was praised for its highlighting Disney villains. Lady Gaga wore an Ursula-inspired dress during ArtRave: The Artpop Ball. In the 2015 season of Dancing with the Stars, Rumer Willis dressed up as Ursula to perform a samba set to "Poor Unfortunate Souls". As arguably "the most famous example of a direct tie to the LGBT community," Ursula has also become something of a gay icon, due in part to sharing Divine's appearance and personality.

Sherie Rene Scott's performance as Ursula in the Broadway adaptation earned her a nomination for Outstanding Featured Actress in a Musical at the Outer Critics Circle Awards. Melissa McCarthy was nominated for the Saturn Award for Best Supporting Actress, the People's Choice Award for The Movie Performance of the Year, and the Nickelodeon Kids' Choice Awards for Favorite Movie Actress and Favorite Villain for her portrayal of Ursula in the 2023 film.

== See also ==
- Sissy villain
