= Wish (soundtrack) =

Wish (Original Motion Picture Soundtrack)

Soundtrack album by various artists
- Released: November 17, 2023
- Recorded: 2022–2023
- Studios: Newman Scoring Stage, 20th Century Studios
- Genres: Pop; musical theatre
- Length: 36:42 (standard); 130:23 (deluxe)
- Label: Walt Disney
- Producers: Julia Michaels; Benjamin Rice

Singles from Wish (Original Motion Picture Soundtrack)
- 1. "This Wish" Released: October 18, 2023; 2. "This Is The Thanks I Get?!" Released: October 25, 2023; 3. "Welcome to Rosas" Released: November 1, 2023; 4. "I'm A Star" Released: November 8, 2023; 5. "Knowing What I Know Now" Released: November 15, 2023

Wish (Original Motion Picture Soundtrack) is the soundtrack to the 2023 Disney animated musical fantasy film Wish. Released by Walt Disney Records on November 17, 2023, the album featured seven original songs with music and lyrics by Julia Michaels and Benjamin Rice, and JP Saxe providing additional songwriting and composing one of the songs. An extended version of the soundtrack featuring instrumentals and demo recordings of the songs, and cues from the film score composed by Dave Metzger, released five days later, that coincided the film's theatrical release. Five singles—"This Wish", "This Is the Thanks I Get?!", "Welcome to Rosas", "I'm A Star" and "Knowing What I Know Now"—preceded the soundtrack.

== Background ==
The original songs were written and composed by Julia Michaels and Benjamin Rice, while the incidental underscore is composed by Dave Metzger. Michaels' involvement was confirmed at the D23 Expo in September 2022, while Metzger and Rice were confirmed to be in the crew by April 2023.

=== Songs ===
Wish marked Michaels' maiden songwriting stint for a feature film after her earlier association for artists such as Britney Spears, Selena Gomez, Justin Bieber, Nick Jonas and Dua Lipa, amongst others. Michaels described the songwriting process as "overwhelming pressure" as Disney's music has been embedded within its legacy and so the expectation for what she had to create for this film compared to the past works. She also added that "what makes Disney songs so special is that they have so much heart, emotion and vulnerability [...] and the fact they can do it in a way that is appealing to everybody, not just kids, it's appealing to adults as well". She tried to incorporate some of the classical feel of Disney whilst keeping it modern and used to play with cadences and time signatures as well as making it true to the story as possible.

A collaborative effort between Metzger and Rice, the duo worked together on the songs during the COVID-19 pandemic in 2021. They often meet with the executives of Disney every Thursdays, on describing the songwriting process and describing the emotions, feelings and essence of individual characters and sketch their basic ideas that they liked and turn it into a song. This helped them to be more creative and brainstorming, as the team were open to new ideas and collaboration. The duo wrote seven original songs and recorded each song at the Newman Scoring Stage in 20th Century Studios, with the duo supervising the session.

=== Score ===
Metzger provided orchestrations for several Disney films while also scoring the direct-to-video films Tarzan and Jane (2002),Tarzan II (2005) and Brother Bear 2 (2006). Wish marked his maiden score for a theatrical Disney animated feature. His involvement was confirmed after Matthew Walker, vice president of Music at Walt Disney and Pixar Animation Studios considered him as the composer for the film. The score was primarily influenced by the original songs, primarily "This Wish", that helped Metzger write the score seamlessly in flow the songs and not to make it sound different.

Metzger utilised ethnic percussion (such as castanets and finger cymbals) as well as "instruments from the Mediterranean region such as guitars to bring color to the score and evoke that kingdom" that exists in the southern tip of the Iberian Peninsula. In addition, he also used Spanish flamenco guitars and string instruments as well as working with a 95-piece orchestra for the score.

The film pays homage to classical Disney in several ways; "When You Wish Upon a Star," the signature song of The Walt Disney Company, first introduced in Pinocchio (1940) was also featured in the film. To incorporate the song into the underscore, he utilized the song's first five notes as the request of Chris Buck, who wanted it sound different, and Metzger played it with an ethereal texture so that it goes "from the Walt Disney Pictures 100th anniversary logo and transition into the land of Rosas and Wish." For Asha's character, Metzger provided a bubbly and energetic score describing her character, but as the film goes on and she is being conflicted, he introduced a bit of dissonance to her theme.

== Marketing and release ==
The soundtrack was announced on the television show Good Morning America on October 16, 2023 (the official 100th anniversary of the Disney studio), that was set for release on November 17, five days before the film's theatrical release. The album featured seven original songs, with a reprise of "This Wish" and instrumentals of four of the tracks. A deluxe version of the soundtrack was released on November 22. It additionally featured Metzger's score, along with instrumental versions of the songs and demo recordings performed by Michaels.

The album was also unveiled in CD and vinyl LP, with a 10'' star die cut picture disc of "This Wish"; all three of them were unveiled at the Disney Music Emporium on December 1. The picture disc was provided for the audience at the film's fan event screenings, along with other merchandises.

== Singles ==
As a part of the marketing strategy, five of its original songs from the soundtrack would be releasing every Wednesday beginning October 18, 2023. "This Wish" was the first song to be released as a single. The song was first teased at the CinemaCon event on April 26, 2023 with a clip of Asha singing the song, which reporters from Deadline Hollywood described as "a very pretty, powerful anthem." The song was additionally co-written and composed by Michaels' ex-boyfriend JP Saxe. Ariana DeBose performed the song at Disneyland Paris post the 2023 SAG-AFTRA strike which ended on November 8. A video clip of her performance was premiered on Good Morning America on the day of the film's release (November 22).

The second song, "This Is the Thanks I Get?!" centered on King Magnifico (Chris Pine), was released on October 25. Audience reception to the song was generally mixed, who compared the similar soundings to that of Lin-Manuel Miranda's compositions for Moana (2016) and Encanto (2021), while certain critics opined the lack of musical finesse compared to other songs for the Disney antagonists. The third song "Welcome to Rosas" was released on November 1, performed by DeBose and the cast members. The fourth song "I'm A Star" was released on November 8, along with a musical video. The fifth song "Knowing What I Know Now" was released on November 15.

== Reception ==
Lindsey Bahr of ABC News described the songs as "slick", "poppy" and "ultimately inoffensive" similar to Benj Pasek and Justin Paul's soundtrack for The Greatest Showman (2017), with the song "This Wish" also being deemed as sounding almost like "For Forever" from Pasek and Paul's stage musical Dear Evan Hansen. Owen Gleiberman of Variety described the musical numbers as "catchy, though in a consumable way that makes it hard not to notice how much they're imitating the Lin-Manuel Miranda school of verbal aggression wrapped in hooks." Brian Truitt of USA Today described the musical numbers as "solid" and called "This Wish" as the "obvious highlight, soon to become a staple on many a little girl's streaming playlist". Lovia Gyarkye of The Hollywood Reporter said that the music "attempts a similar type of fusion, mixing infectious contemporary pop beats with lyrics honoring singalong-friendly roots."

Damon Wise, in his review for Deadline Hollywood, was critical of the musical numbers as it lacked the "catchy primacy" of the soundtrack of Frozen (2013). Bilge Ebiri of Vulture felt that the music "does have a Broadway-ready feel [...] but there's a hollowness and predictability to the tunes and lyrics [...] The music in Wish seems to have been conceived and written not to advance the story or provide beauty but to fill an industrial need." Rachel Labonte of Screen Rant also said "there are several songs within the movie's soundtrack that feel poised to become hits" but the album in its entirety "may not stand the test of time".

== Track listing ==
Wish (Original Motion Picture Soundtrack) track listing
No.	Title	Lyrics	Music	Performer(s)	Length
1.	"Welcome to Rosas"	Julia Michaels	Michaels; Benjamin Rice	Ariana DeBose; Wish cast	2:28
2.	"At All Costs"	Michaels	Michaels; Rice	DeBose; Chris Pine	3:18
3.	"This Wish"	Michaels	Michaels; Rice; JP Saxe	DeBose	3:25
4.	"I'm a Star"	Michaels	Michaels; Rice	Wish cast	2:54
5.	"This Is the Thanks I Get?!"	Michaels	Michaels; Rice	Pine	3:14
6.	"Knowing What I Know Now"	Michaels	Michaels; Rice	DeBose; Angelique Cabral; Niko Vargas; Harvey Guillén; Jennifer Kumiyama; Jon Rudnitsky; Della Saba; Ramy Youssef; Wish cast	3:20
7.	"This Wish (Reprise)"	Michaels	Michaels; Rice; Saxe	DeBose; Kumiyama; Cabral; Natasha Rothwell; Victor Garber; Guillén; Rudnitsky; Saba; Vargas; Youssef; Wish cast	2:45
8.	"A Wish Worth Making"	Michaels	Michaels; Rice	Michaels	2:53
9.	"This Wish (Instrumental)"	Michaels	Michaels; Rice; Saxe	Michaels; Rice	3:25
10.	"I'm a Star (Instrumental)"	Michaels	Michaels; Rice	Michaels; Rice	2:54
11.	"This Is the Thanks I Get?! (Instrumental)"	Michaels	Michaels; Rice	Michaels; Rice	3:14
12.	"A Wish Worth Making (Instrumental)"	Michaels	Michaels; Rice	Michaels; Rice	2:53
Total length:					36:42

Wish (Original Motion Picture Soundtrack) deluxe edition track listing
No.	Title	Lyrics	Music	Performer(s)	Length
1.	"Welcome to Rosas"	Julia Michaels	Michaels; Benjamin Rice	Ariana DeBose; Wish cast	2:28
2.	"At All Costs"	Michaels	Michaels; Rice	DeBose; Chris Pine	3:19
3.	"This Wish"	Michaels	Michaels; Rice; JP Saxe	DeBose	3:26
4.	"I'm a Star"	Michaels	Michaels; Rice	Wish cast	2:55
5.	"This Is the Thanks I Get?!"	Michaels	Michaels; Rice	Pine	3:14
6.	"Knowing What I Know Now"	Michaels	Michaels; Rice	DeBose; Angelique Cabral; Niko Vargas; Harvey Guillén; Jennifer Kumiyama; Jon Rudnitsky; Della Saba; Ramy Youssef; Wish cast	3:21
7.	"This Wish (Reprise)"	Michaels	Michaels; Rice; Saxe	DeBose; Kumiyama; Cabral; Natasha Rothwell; Victor Garber; Guillén; Rudnitsky; Saba; Vargas; Youssef; Wish cast	2:42
8.	"A Wish Worth Making"	Michaels	Michaels; Rice	Michaels	2:56
9.	"The Kingdom of Rosas"		Dave Metzger		2:06
10.	"Meet the Family"		Metzger		1:00
11.	"Countdown to Interview"		Metzger		0:46
12.	"Meet the Teens"		Metzger		2:27
13.	"Meet Magnifico"		Metzger		4:10
14.	"The Wishes of Rosas"		Metzger		0:57
15.	"Sabino's Wish"		Metzger		0:56
16.	"A Disappointing Truth"		Metzger		1:49
17.	"Wish Granting Ceremony"		Metzger		1:48
18.	"Magnifico's Rejection"		Metzger		0:36
19.	"Dinner Table"		Metzger		2:01
20.	"Everything the Light Touches"		Metzger		1:10
21.	"A Star is Born"		Metzger		2:47
22.	"Guide Away!"		Metzger		1:34
23.	"Consulting the Spellbook"		Metzger		1:56
24.	"Asha Sneaks In with Star"		Metzger		1:07
25.	"Hiding Something"		Metzger		1:33
26.	"The Teens Meet Star"		Metzger		1:12
27.	"A Promise and a Decision"		Metzger		1:21
28.	"Stalling a King"		Metzger		3:42
29.	"The King Descends"		Metzger		0:43
30.	"A Wish Returns"		Metzger		3:14
31.	"The Journey Calls"		Metzger		1:42
32.	"The Corruption of a King"		Metzger		2:19
33.	"Sir Simon"		Metzger		3:12
34.	"The Teens' Question"		Metzger		1:15
35.	"A Warning and a Plan"		Metzger		0:39
36.	"The Plan in Action"		Metzger		4:20
37.	"A Leap, a Look and a Lesson"		Metzger		2:00
38.	"Magnifico's Rise"		Metzger		3:27
39.	"We Did It!"		Metzger		1:51
40.	"Mirror, Mirror/Rosas Celebration"		Metzger		1:29
41.	"Rosas Finale"		Metzger		2:29
42.	"The Happy Chicken Song"		Metzger		0:42
43.	"This Wish (Demo)"	Michaels	Michaels; Rice; Saxe	Michaels	3:23
44.	"At All Costs (Demo)"	Michaels	Michaels; Rice	Rice; Michaels	3:18
45.	"I'm a Star (Demo)"	Michaels	Michaels; Rice	Michaels	2:58
46.	"Knowing What I Know Now (Demo)"	Michaels	Michaels; Rice	Michaels	3:15
47.	"Welcome to Rosas (Instrumental)"	Michaels	Michaels; Rice	Michaels; Rice	2:28
48.	"At All Costs (Instrumental)"	Michaels	Michaels; Rice	Michaels; Rice	3:19
49.	"This Wish (Instrumental)"	Michaels	Michaels; Rice; Saxe	Michaels; Rice	3:26
50.	"I'm a Star (Instrumental)"	Michaels	Michaels; Rice	Michaels; Rice	2:55
51.	"This Is the Thanks I Get?! (Instrumental)"	Michaels	Michaels; Rice	Michaels; Rice	3:14
52.	"Knowing What I Know Now (Instrumental)"	Michaels	Michaels; Rice	Michaels; Rice	3:21
53.	"This Wish (Reprise) (Instrumental)"	Michaels	Michaels; Rice; Saxe	Michaels; Rice	2:42
54.	"A Wish Worth Making (Instrumental)"	Michaels	Michaels; Rice	Michaels; Rice	2:56
55.	"Wish End Credits Score Suite"		Metzger		4:32
Total length:					130:23

== Commercial performance ==
The song "This Wish" by Ariana DeBose ranked No. 70 on the UK's Official Singles Sales Chart. In France, the soundtrack for Wish peaked at No. 111.

== Charts ==
=== Weekly charts ===
Chart performance for Wish (Original Motion Picture Soundtrack)
Chart (2023–2024)	Peak position
French Albums (SNEP)	111
UK Compilation Albums (OCC)	7
UK Album Downloads (OCC)	3
UK Soundtrack Albums (OCC)	6
US Billboard 200	150
US Kid Albums (Billboard)	4
US Top Soundtracks (Billboard)	3

=== Year-end charts ===
2024 year-end chart performance for Wish (Original Motion Picture Soundtrack)
Chart (2024)	Peak position
US Kid Albums (Billboard)	5
US Top Soundtracks (Billboard)	12
