= Mufasa: The Lion King (soundtrack) =

2024 soundtrack by Lin-Manuel Miranda and Lebo M

Mufasa: The Lion King (Original Motion Picture Soundtrack)

Soundtrack album by Lin-Manuel Miranda and Lebo M
- Released: December 13, 2024
- Length: 16:21
- Language: English; Swahili; Xhosa; Zulu
- Label: Walt Disney
- Producer: Lin-Manuel Miranda; Mark Mancina; Tom MacDougall

Lin-Manuel Miranda chronology
Warriors (2024)	Mufasa: The Lion King (Original Motion Picture Soundtrack) (2024)	Moana (2026)

Mufasa: The Lion King (Original Score)

Film score by Dave Metzger
- Released: December 20, 2024
- Length: 50:52
- Label: Walt Disney
- Producer: Dave Metzger

Dave Metzger chronology
Wish (2023)	Mufasa: The Lion King (Original Score) (2024)

The 2024 American musical drama film Mufasa: The Lion King has original songs written by Lin-Manuel Miranda and a score composed by Dave Metzger. The film's soundtrack album features seven songs and was released on December 13, 2024, through Walt Disney Records; a deluxe edition released on the same day includes the score and instrumental tracks. Metzger's score was also released on December 20, 2024, as its own digital album. The film is a prequel to The Lion King (2019), a photorealistically animated remake of The Lion King (1994); Miranda collaborated on the songs with South African composer Lebo M, who was involved with the 1994 film. Production on the album was handled by Miranda, Mark Mancina, and Tom MacDougall.

The soundtrack features vocal contributions from the South African Gospel Choir, who also sing in Swahili and Zulu. A brief version of "Hakuna Matata", by Billy Eichner and Seth Rogen voicing Timon and Pumbaa, appears in the film but is not included on the album. The soundtrack album was also released on the same day with songs translated into French, German, Castilian Spanish, Latin American Spanish, Italian, Polish, Finnish, Swedish, Norwegian, Danish, Portuguese, Brazilian Portuguese, Egyptian Arabic, Hebrew, Hindi, Kazakh, Korean, Mandarin Chinese, Dutch, Flemish Dutch, Russian, Tamil, Telugu, Thai, and Vietnamese, as well as a Japanese version a week later.

== Background and composition ==
In December 2020, Disney announced that Hans Zimmer, who worked on the 1994 and 2019 films, would return to score the film, alongside Pharrell and Nicholas Britell. In April 2024, Miranda praised many of the songwriters involved for the franchise's music over the years, stating that "The Lion King has an incredible musical legacy with music by some of the greatest composers around, and I am humbled and proud to be a part of it." In mid-2021, Jenkins contacted Miranda about working on the film; at the time, he had just finished working on songwriting for Encanto (2021) and was in the editing process for his directorial debut film, Tick, Tick... Boom! (2021). Miranda started work on the songs in early 2022 and worked on Mufasa: The Lion King at the same time as his concept album Warriors.

Lebo M, whose vocals are heard in "Circle of Life", the opening song from The Lion King, admitted he felt pressure in writing a "worthy successor"; he ended up writing "Ngomso" in one morning, which features lyrics in Xhosa. "Milele", which means "forever" in Swahili, is sung by Mufasa's parents and is the song which required the most workshopping; Miranda listened to a lot of spirituals during its songwriting. "I Always Wanted a Brother" is sung by Mufasa and Taka as cubs and soundtracks a montage as the two grow up together. Miranda drew inspiration from his two sons while writing the song and also revealed that it was the first song he worked on for the film, then proceeding fairly consecutively through the film's musical numbers.

"Bye Bye", sung by Mads Mikkelsen's character, was the only song Miranda pitched to Jenkins that was not originally present in the script, as he felt he wanted to write a dancehall villain song. Miranda watched a clip of Mikkelsen in his 20s performing a number from The Pajama Game on Med kjærlig hilsen to confirm that he could sing. "We Go Together" is a song about the friendship between the film's main characters and also sets up Taka's attraction to Sarabi. "Tell Me It's You", a romantic ballad between Mufasa and Sarabi, has been described as a spiritual successor to The Lion King's "Can You Feel the Love Tonight"; Miranda revealed he wanted to write a love song in the vein of an end credits song like "Beauty and the Beast" by Celine Dion and Peabo Bryson. Miranda also pulled inspiration from 1990s R&B artists K-Ci & JoJo and Jodeci, and made use of reverb to accompany the song's ice cavern setting in the film. "Brother Betrayed", which reflects the moment Taka becomes Scar, was the song that took the shortest amount of time to write; Miranda compared it to the act one finale of The Phantom of the Opera with the chandelier crash.

Dave Metzger, who composed the score, wanted to honor Zimmer's score from the franchise's previous releases, while Jenkins wanted Mufasa: The Lion King to also have its own sound. Metzger used themes based on Miranda's songs and also wrote a new theme for Rafiki. He also wrote a theme for Kiara and worked with Lebo M to incorporate African choral elements.

== Reception ==
Billboard reported that the soundtrack has become a "streaming success", led by "I Always Wanted a Brother" as its most-streamed song. "I Always Wanted a Brother" charted at number 34 on the UK singles chart, and number 84 on the Irish Singles Chart. The track "Tell Me It's You" was shortlisted in the category of Best Original Song for the 97th Academy Awards.

Accolades for Mufasa: The Lion King (Original Motion Picture Soundtrack)
Award	Date of ceremony	Category	Recipient(s)	Result	Ref.
Black Reel Awards	February 10, 2025	Outstanding Soundtrack	Mufasa: The Lion King (Original Motion Picture Soundtrack)	Nominated	

== Track listing ==
All music is composed by Lin-Manuel Miranda only, except "Ngomso", which was written by Lebo M, "Milele" and "We Go Together", written by Miranda and Lebo M, and "I Always Wanted a Brother", written by Miranda and Nicholas Britell.

Mufasa: The Lion King (Original Motion Picture Soundtrack) track listing
No.	Title	Performer(s)	Length
1.	"Ngomso"	Lebo M	1:16
2.	"Milele"	Anika Noni Rose and Keith David	2:27
3.	"I Always Wanted a Brother"	Braelyn Rankins, Theo Somolu, Aaron Pierre, and Kelvin Harrison Jr.	3:34
4.	"Bye Bye"	Mads Mikkelsen, Joanna Jones, and Folake Olowofoyeku	2:15
5.	"We Go Together"	Aaron Pierre, Kelvin Harrison Jr., Tiffany Boone, Preston Nyman, and Kagiso Lediga	2:44
6.	"Tell Me It's You"	Aaron Pierre and Tiffany Boone	2:27
7.	"Brother Betrayed"	Kelvin Harrison Jr.	1:37

Deluxe edition additional tracks
No.	Title	Writer(s)	Performer(s)	Length
8.	"Destiny Reigns"	Dave Metzger; Hans Zimmer	Dave Metzger	3:01
9.	"Kuqondile"	Nicholas Britell; Lebo M	Nicholas Britell and Lebo M	1:57
10.	"Listen to My Voice"	Metzger; Zimmer; Lebo M	Dave Metzger	2:43
11.	"Find the Way"	Britell; Lebo M	Nicholas Britell and Lebo M	1:07
12.	"The Race"	Metzger; Zimmer; Lin-Manuel Miranda; Britell	Dave Metzger	2:23
13.	"Home"	Britell; Lebo M	Nicholas Britell and Lebo M	1:47
14.	"Burden of Pride"	Metzger; Zimmer; Miranda; Lebo M	Dave Metzger	5:04
15.	"My Love"	Metzger; Zimmer; Lebo M; Britell	Dave Metzger and Lebo M	1:44
16.	"Bathroom Break"	Metzger	Dave Metzger	0:31
17.	"Run Mufasa!"	Metzger; Zimmer; Lebo M; Miranda; Britell	Dave Metzger	3:19
18.	"And So It's Time"	Zimmer; Lebo M	Hans Zimmer and Lebo M	0:30
19.	"All That Was Lost"	Metzger	Dave Metzger	1:06
20.	"Jamaa"	Metzger	Dave Metzger	1:29
21.	"Follow the Fireflies"	Metzger	Dave Metzger	0:54
22.	"Smell a Duck"	Metzger	Dave Metzger	2:18
23.	"Elephant Stampede"	Metzger; Zimmer; Lebo M	Dave Metzger	1:34
24.	"Beneath the Scars"	Metzger	Dave Metzger	1:06
25.	"The King Within"	Metzger; Miranda	Dave Metzger	1:51
26.	"We Made It"	Britell; Lebo M	Nicholas Britell and Lebo M	1:34
27.	"Clash of Kings"	Metzger; Zimmer	Dave Metzger	1:52
28.	"Blood for Blood"	Metzger; Miranda; Britell	Dave Metzger	2:34
29.	"The Earth Will Shake"	Metzger; Zimmer; Miranda; Britell	Dave Metzger	3:40
30.	"The King of Milele"	Metzger; Zimmer; Lebo M	Dave Metzger	2:23
31.	"A Story of a Great King"	Metzger; Zimmer; Lebo M; Elton John; Tim Rice	Dave Metzger and Lebo M	4:14
32.	"Ngomso" (instrumental)		Mark Mancina and Lebo M	1:05
33.	"Milele" (instrumental)		Mark Mancina and Lin-Manuel Miranda	2:27
34.	"I Always Wanted a Brother" (instrumental)		Mark Mancina and Lin-Manuel Miranda	3:34
35.	"Bye Bye" (instrumental)		Mark Mancina, Lin-Manuel Miranda, and Dave Metzger	2:15
36.	"We Go Together" (instrumental)		Mark Mancina and Lin-Manuel Miranda	2:44
37.	"Tell Me It's You" (instrumental)		Mark Mancina and Lin-Manuel Miranda	2:26
38.	"Brother Betrayed" (instrumental)		Mark Mancina and Lin-Manuel Miranda	1:37

Notes

- The score (tracks 8–31) was also released as a separate album, Mufasa: The Lion King (Original Score).

== Charts ==
Chart performance for Mufasa: The Lion King (Original Motion Picture Soundtrack)
Chart (2024–2025)	Peak position
Austrian Albums (Ö3 Austria)	68
Belgian Albums (Ultratop Flanders)	119
Belgian Albums (Ultratop Wallonia)	104
Dutch Albums (Album Top 100)	37
French Albums (SNEP)	83
Irish Compilation Albums (IRMA)	10
UK Compilation Albums (Official Charts)	9
UK Soundtrack Albums (Official Charts)	3
US Billboard 200	169
US Independent Albums (Billboard)	16
US Kid Albums (Billboard)	2
US Top Soundtracks (Billboard)	6

Year-end chart performance for Mufasa: The Lion King (Original Motion Picture Soundtrack)
Chart (2025)	Peak position
US Top Soundtracks (Billboard)	25
US Kid Albums (Billboard)	11
