= Asha (Wish) =

Fictional character from Wish

- Wish character
- First appearance: Once Upon a Studio (2023) (presentation; cameo); Wish (2023) (formal introduction)
- Created by: Jennifer Lee; Chris Buck; Allison Moore; Fawn Veerasunthorn
- Voiced by: Ariana DeBose; Gaia (Italian voice)

In-universe information
- Occupation: Tour guide Fairy godmother
- Family: Tomás (deceased father); Sakina (mother); Sabino (paternal grandfather)
- Home: Kingdom of Rosas

Asha is a fictional character and the protagonist of the animated film Wish (2023) produced by Walt Disney Animation Studios. She is voiced by American actress Ariana DeBose. Her origins lie in a conversation between Jennifer Lee and Chris Buck, while working together on Frozen II. The screenplay was written by Lee and Allison Moore. Asha is an ordinary 17-year-old girl who lives in Rosas, a kingdom ruled by King Magnifico (Chris Pine), a powerful sorcerer. After initially applying to become his apprentice, she begins to question his control of his subjects' wishes.

Breaking from the traditions of other Disney heroines, Asha was designed to be a modern heroine, having no romantic interest. Her design takes inspiration from the Amazigh, particularly her box braids. Her characterisation was designed following the writing of the song "This Wish" in 2020 by songwriter Julia Michaels. The song expresses her desire for a better future for the people of Rosas, resulting in a magical being named Star falling from the sky. The star's magic gives the creatures of the forest their own voices, including her pet goat, Valentino. With the star's magic and the support of her friends, she leads an uprising against the tyrannical rule of Magnifico.

Asha received a mixed response from critics. Her appearance as a biracial teenager and her qualities as a leader and strong female character were praised. Conversely, she received criticism for her limited characterisation, with several critics considering her to have few memorable character traits. For her vocal performance, DeBose received several film award nominations.

== Development ==
=== Concept and creation ===
Wish (2023) originated in conversations at Walt Disney Animation Studios between chief creative officer Jennifer Lee and co-director Chris Buck while they were working on Frozen II (2019). Lee preempted the arrival of the studio's 100th anniversary and was interested in producing a film to coincide with the forthcoming event. They collected stills from earlier Disney animated films and pinned them to a billboard. This led to the realisation that many of the films featured characters wishing on a star. The filmmakers knew that the project should centre on wishing and wanted to create a homage to the studio's history with an original story. Lee was inspired by the Pinocchio (1940) song "When You Wish Upon a Star", a song commonly played alongside the Disney logo and associated with the Disney brand. She said that it was the first song that she knew and wanted to "deconstruct" its message, deciding that it is a "declaration of what's driving your heart". Buck said that internal screenings of the film showed that the audience failed to understand the emotional power of wishing and therefore the team had to work at illustrating its power.

In 2020, songwriter Julia Michaels wrote the song "This Wish" before the script was written. It started with her receiving a call from Tom MacDougall, president of Walt Disney Music. She said that the song helped to steer the film's story as the concept centred around "an ordinary girl who goes on this brave, selfless journey to get wishes back for the people she loves". Buck and Fawn Veerasunthorn were co-directors on the project, while the screenplay was written by Lee, Allison Moore and Buck, with songs written by Michaels and Benjamin Rice.

=== Characterisation ===
Lee took early inspiration from the legacy of the studio, in particular from Walt Disney, but knew that Asha needed to be her own character. The spirit of Asha was initially founded in the song "This Wish", written by Michaels. Lee said that it helped her to see Asha's youthful spirit, particularly in the climax of the song, when Asha reaches the peak of her desire to want something more for the people of Rosas. She used this moment to work backwards, defining Asha's journey to the point where she is completely relaxed and has no cares.

Buck and Veerasunthorn wanted to create a relatable heroine in Asha. Veerasunthorn said that she felt that being a princess of royal blood was not as important to a contemporary audience as being able to see themselves in the character, so Asha is not a Disney Princess. Lee said that audiences expect a more complex story than in previous decades and thus Asha is an average teenager who does not need to be restricted by her social status. Buck preferred to refer to Disney female protagonists as "Disney heroines", noting that "it's assumed that our heroines are princesses". He and Lee cited the Frozen (2013) characters Elsa and Anna, commenting that they were not initially written as princesses and noted that several animated females in Disney films are not royal. Lee explained that the concept of the princess has evolved since the original fairytales of the Brothers Grimm and Hans Christian Andersen where being a princess was the "reward". She said that in Frozen, the characters are royal because they must feel the burden of responsibility, whereas with Asha she was excited to write an "ordinary hero's journey". Producer Peter Del Vecho agreed that Asha needed to make the film feel contemporary but also timeless: "She's common and we think that makes her incredibly relatable".

Asha is an idealist who is questioning the flaws in the world around her. The film takes her on a journey in which she becomes active in the world and wants to make an impact. Lee wanted Asha's journey to be applicable in real life, describing her as "inviting, warm and so honest". She said that Asha represents the point in a young idealistic person's life when they realise that the world is challenging and they have to decide what kind of person they want to be. She opined that Asha has "one of the most universal goals", explaining that the film celebrates her struggle to achieve a dream but also recognises her failures. Del Vecho highlighted Asha's qualities, describing her as "quirky", "witty" and "brave". He also drew attention to her selflessness in fighting against the injustice of King Magnifico stealing the wishes of his subjects. Lee thought of Asha as a modern heroine who does not need anyone to save her. Instead, she believed it was important that Asha must fight to achieve her goals: "the greatest power of a fairy tale is when it's giving you ways to cope through something". Reflecting on the power of Asha's wish, she saw the story as a journey from wanting more for her community to becoming a leader. She said that Asha's story differs from previous fairytales because, rather than staying the same and changing others, she evolves through making difficult choices and having the support of others.

Veerasunthorn stated that it was necessary to ensure that Asha is part of the community of Rosas and believes it to be a wonderful place to live. She begins as a tour guide, but is also an artist. She carries a sketchbook around that displays her drawings, including some animation along with a timing chart used by animators, which is a callback to Disney's artists. Veerasunthorn said that her drawings also illustrate that "she's not afraid to put whatever her dream is on the page". For the purposes of the story, Asha was given a group of seven friends of her own age, each with a distinctive character trait that resembles one of the Seven Dwarfs in Snow White and the Seven Dwarfs (1937), who just like her have yet to relinquish their wishes to Magnifico.

The film's songs were written to reveal various characteristics about Asha. In the first song "Welcome to Rosas", she acts as a tour guide. The song introduces the audience to the character but also reveals her love of the city and its residents. In the song "At All Costs", a duet between Asha and King Magnifico, the two characters are emotionally aligned, with both expressing how the wishes are important to them. The song was written to be beautiful like a wedding song, as there is no romantic song in the film. Michaels emphasised that it reflects the differing standpoints between the heroine and the villain, explaining that one character is selfless, while the other is entirely selfish. Veerasunthorn explained that the two characters have different approaches to protecting the wishes, which breaks them apart. While Magnifico understands their beauty, Asha recognises that their power is more than the moment in which they are granted, but also in the journey that propels the wisher to take steps towards their goal. The song "This Wish" centres around Asha making a wish for the city and believing in herself. Michaels said it was written at a time of activism in her life, but admitted to being less outwardly brave than Asha. Veerasunthorn explained that the songs are all connected by a build up in Asha's frustration and "This Wish" is the culmination of her desire for the people around her to get their wishes. The song "Knowing What I Know Now" focuses on Asha rallying her friends into revolting against Magnifico and is a turning point for the character. Although her friends initially think she is a traitor to the kingdom, Asha proves them wrong. Lee said that the song is the moment when she becomes a leader.

=== Voice ===
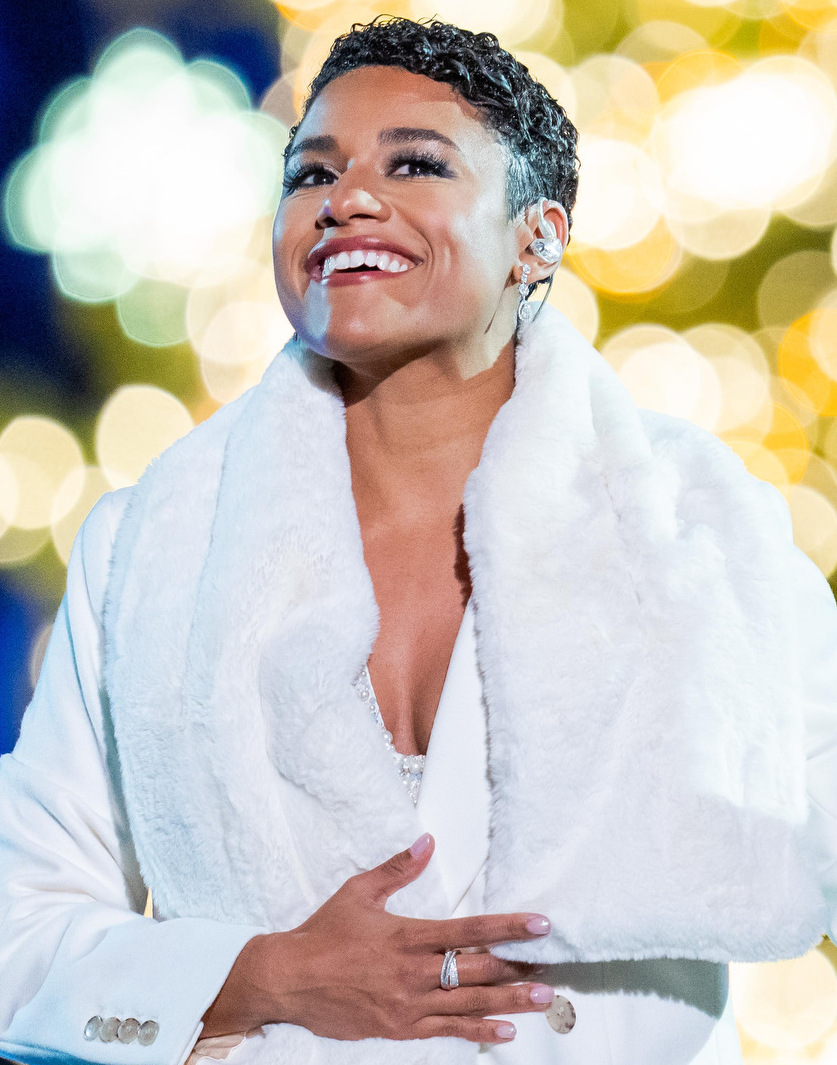
Ariana DeBose is the voice of Asha in Wish.

Ariana DeBose's casting in the role of Asha was revealed at D23 Expo on 9 September 2022. She was approached by Walt Disney Animation Studios after the premiere of West Side Story (2021). After speaking to Buck and learning about the story, she said that she "cried like a baby" due to being a Disney fan in childhood. While recording the dialogue for Asha, she was inspired by earlier Disney heroines, including Cinderella, Mulan and Raya. She was particularly proud of her character, saying "She has braids, she has freckles, and she's beautifully brown", and felt that Asha was leading a new era of Disney heroines. She felt that it was important that female protagonists "don't all have blonde hair and blue eyes". DeBose expressed excitement about voicing a character with a similar appearance and wanted girls to be able to identify with Asha, saying "she's not one thing, she's many, many things".

For Asha's characterisation, DeBose maintained that she should always lead from the heart and follow her instincts even if it means that she makes mistakes. She felt that young people "should be allowed to experiment and to make a choice, realize it's not the right one, and pivot". Within the pantheon of Disney protagonists she thought that Asha is very different to earlier protagonists because she is selfless. She described her as a "helper", commenting that when she makes her wish it is not for herself, but for everyone in the community. She also defended the lack of romance in the film by stating that Disney female characters do not necessarily need to focus on finding a romantic partner, but highlighted the "beautiful connection" between Asha and Star. Referring to a moment in the film when Asha is given a magic wand by Star, DeBose described her as a "modern-day fairy godmother", explaining that she redefines the concept of what it means to be a fairy.

DeBose spent time talking to the animators about how Asha should move. Being a tour guide, she said that the character expresses herself through her physicality: "She's not afraid of her hips, and she's not afraid of her movement." She also had a hand in influencing the way that Asha was written. In particular, a scene in which Asha chooses to give bad news to her grandfather was influenced by DeBose expressing how difficult she would find the conversation. Lee said that this gave the character more compassion and that the scene was written in collaboration with DeBose to give her more emotional depth. Speaking of the film's message, DeBose felt that Asha represents a reminder that "when you have a true wish in your heart, anything is possible".

DeBose described Asha's song "This Wish" as "the mother of all 'I want' songs", admitting that it was a "really hard song" that gave her anxiety and required some vocal training. She felt that the song has an "important message". She said that recording the song took her out of her comfort zone because she thought that it was beautiful and was afraid to mess it up. She also described it as "one of the most beautiful experiences of my life thus far". For the duet "At All Costs", DeBose recorded her vocals separately to Pine. She said that it was her favourite song in the film because it reveals the passion and unconditional love in Asha's heart.

=== Design ===
According to The Art of Wish, Asha is of North African and European descent, her mother being from North Africa and her father from the Iberian Peninsula. Bill Schwab, art director of characters, said that Asha's box braids were the design element that helped him to find the uniqueness in the character. To achieve historical accuracy Disney animation researchers took inspiration from the Amazigh who have a tradition of braiding and decorating their hair. Asha's design features a historically accurate medieval v-shaped belt that hangs just below the waist. Asha uses a leather embossed journal for her sketching, which is a callback to the storybooks featured in the opening credits of earlier fairytales, such as Pinocchio, Cinderella (1950) and Sleeping Beauty (1959). Her design incorporates the colour purple, which is a symbol of hope for the Amazigh and also representative of transformation in many cultures. Griselda Sastrawinata-Lemay, associate production designer took inspiration from the Fairy Godmother in Cinderella for Asha's dress and hooded cloak. She used a greyish lavender purple palette and teardrop motifs to represent pumpkin seeds. Her shoes took inspiration from the wedding shoes worn by Princess Diana.

== Appearances ==
=== Wish ===
In the kingdom of Rosas, 17-year old Asha welcomes newcomers and gives them a tour of the city. She aspires to be apprentice to the ruler of Rosas, King Magnifico, a powerful sorcerer. The residents adore their king and, on their 18th birthday, give their greatest wish to Magnifico to be kept safe under his protection. Once a month, he holds a ceremony in which one of his subjects is granted their wish. Asha meets Magnifico at the interview in his castle and they find a common goal in their desire to protect the wishes. She questions his motives after he refuses to grant the wish of her 100-year-old grandfather Sabino. Angered by her challenge, he tricks her into believing that he will grant the wish at the ceremony, only to give the honour to another resident. Frustrated by the knowledge that her grandfather will never have his wish, Asha makes a wish to the starry night sky for a better future. The wish causes a magical being to fall from the sky, which she names Star. Through the star's magic, the animals in the wood are given the ability to speak, including Valentino, her pet goat. She hides Star inside the castle but they are discovered by Asha's friends. Sensing the presence of Star, Magnifico feels threatened by its power and is tempted into using forbidden magic. With the help of her friend Dahlia, Asha sneaks into Magnifico's study to retrieve her grandfather's wish, but that night Magnifico arrives at her home and crushes her mother Sakina's wish, which empowers him. The family escape by boat to a nearby island. Becoming increasingly desperate after being questioned by the people of Rosas, Magnifico uses forbidden magic to create a magic staff, which corrupts him further. Asha discovers that her friend Simon betrayed her to Magnifico so that he would be granted his wish to become a knight. Asha is given a stick by Star with magic power and she distracts Magnifico, while her friends infiltrate his tower with the aim of releasing the wishes by opening the roof. Asha discovers that Simon is disguised as Magnifico having been brainwashed. At the castle, Magnifico uses his magic to contain the wishes and absorbs Star in his staff. He restrains all of the people of Rosas with his magic, including Asha, who calls upon the people to rise against him. With the power of their collective wish he is overpowered and trapped inside the mirror on his staff. His wife Queen Amaya remains as the sole ruler of Rosas and orders the mirror to be locked in the dungeons. Star returns to the sky, but gifts Asha a new magic wand and she promises to help the people fulfill their wishes as a fairy godmother.

=== Once Upon a Studio ===
Asha makes a minor appearance in Once Upon a Studio, a short animated film that was produced to celebrate the 100th anniversary of Disney Animation.

=== Theme parks ===
At the 2023 Destination D23 fan event, Asha was revealed as one of the characters due to appear in various Disney theme parks, including Disneyland, Epcot, and Disneyland Paris. Asha is a meetable character at Walt Disney World and makes a daily appearance at a gazebo in World Showcase Plaza at Epcot.

== Reception ==
=== Critical response ===
Asha's characterisation was the subject of discussion amongst critics. Lee Lamarche of MovieWeb opined that she conforms to Disney Princess tropes, being a girl who fights against a powerful antagonist and has a cute sidekick, but felt that the film suffers from Disney Princess fatigue. B. J. Colangelo writing for SlashFilm agreed that Asha has the traits of a Disney Princess but felt that she is a reflection of all previous Disney heroines, highlighting her beauty and humour, her talking pet goat sidekick and non-speaking Star sidekick, and her defiance and leadership qualities. Jessica Smith of ScreenRant found Asha's status confusing, commenting that although Asha is not technically of royal blood, she could qualify as a Disney Princess as there are previous female leads in Disney animated films who are also not royal, such as Mulan. In a review of the film, Urmi Chakraborty of The Telegraph India highlighted Asha's qualities, commenting that she has a "heart of gold", but found her strength to be her mixed-race. Despite this, the reviewer considered her to be "one-dimensional, with no flaws of her own to fight alongside the antagonist". Lovia Gyarkye writing for The Hollywood Reporter opined that Asha symbolises the future of the Disney brand, being both a biracial teenager and "a dissenter and pseudo-revolutionary figure". IndieWire's Kate Erbland praised Asha's depiction, highlighting her "adorable freckles" and "realistic braids". She said that although Asha's story is traditional, her characteristics are not, particularly her biracial background, diverse friendship group, and absence of a romantic interest, which she considered a timely and interesting combination. Amy Nicholson writing for The New York Times described Asha as a "humanist" driving a "spiritual revolution" to overturn a man who frames himself to be the only route to obtaining a miracle.

The Guardian's Benjamin Lee disliked Asha's lack of character development, describing her as a "barely etched character defined by little more than an ability to belt out a tune". Kate Stables of GamesRadar+ thought that Asha was let down by the script, which she said was more concerned with Disney homages than creating emotional depth. She also described DeBose's rendition of "This Wish" as a "verbose pop ballad" lacking in emotion. Brian Tallerico writing for RogerEbert.com expressed confusion over her empowerment song in the woods, saying that it is unclear whether Asha becomes a star or is given a gift by the star. Mireia Mullor of Digital Spy thought that Asha should have been more rounded and said that more time should have been spent on her character instead of Magnifico. Devan Coggan of Entertainment Weekly reacted negatively to Asha's characterisation, describing her as a "composite of the last 100 years" with no defining character traits when compared to earlier Disney heroines. Petrana Radulovic of Polygon wrote that, like the other characters, Asha is designed to be a reference to earlier Disney characters, but has no memorable character traits of her own. TheWrap's Kristen Lopez found Asha's characterisation to be shallow, noting that there is nothing much in her character other than "her courage and losing her dad". She opined that the film focuses more on the city of Rosas than the protagonist herself. Jenny Nulf writing for The Austin Chronicle echoed this by saying that the audience never learns much about her other than discovering that she cares about others and has a dead parent.

Despite the mixed reception to the character, DeBose received a positive response for her voice work. Deadline's Damon Wise described DeBose's Asha as "the star of the show" and her performance as "effortlessly charming". Robbie Collin of The Telegraph praised Asha's humanity and placed much of her success as a "likeable heroine" on DeBose's vocal performance. Ross Bonaime of Collider responded positively to DeBose's vocals, stating that she brings life to Asha in contrast to the "poor script and forgettable music". Carlos Aguilar writing for IGN felt that DeBose's rendition of "This Wish" is the film's highlight, noting the power of her voice within its "heartfelt chorus". Brian Truitt of USA Today enjoyed the quality of DeBose's singing, citing her "powerhouse vocals" as the best part of the film. Laura Martin of TechRadar also admired the power and emotion in DeBose's singing. Francesca Steele of Inews called DeBose an "exceptional singer" but felt that she was let down by the story and music.

=== Accolades ===
For her voice performance, DeBose was nominated for several awards, including Best Animated Female at the 2023 Alliance of Women Film Journalists EDA Awards, Best Voice-Over Performance at the Astra Film Awards, and Outstanding Voice Performance at the Black Reel Awards.
