= Wish (film) =

2023 Disney animated film

- Theatrical release poster
- Directed by: Chris Buck; Fawn Veerasunthorn
- Screenplay by: Jennifer Lee; Allison Moore
- Story by: Jennifer Lee; Chris Buck; Fawn Veerasunthorn; Allison Moore
- Produced by: Peter Del Vecho; Juan Pablo Reyes Lancaster-Jones
- Starring: Ariana DeBose; Chris Pine; Alan Tudyk; Angelique Cabral; Victor Garber; Natasha Rothwell
- Cinematography: Rob Dressel (layout); Adolph Lusinsky (lighting)
- Edited by: Jeff Draheim
- Music by: Dave Metzger (score); Julia Michaels (songs); Benjamin Rice (songs)
- Production company: Walt Disney Animation Studios
- Distributed by: Walt Disney Studios; Motion Pictures (Note: Distributed under the Walt Disney Pictures banner.)
- Release dates: November 8, 2023 (El Capitan Theatre); November 22, 2023 (United States)
- Running time: 95 minutes
- Country: United States
- Language: English
- Budget: $175–200 million
- Box office: $255 million

Wish is a 2023 American animated musical fantasy film produced by Walt Disney Animation Studios. It was directed by Chris Buck and Fawn Veerasunthorn and written by Jennifer Lee and Allison Moore, and stars the voices of Ariana DeBose, Chris Pine, Alan Tudyk, Angelique Cabral, Victor Garber, and Natasha Rothwell. The story follows a 17-year-old girl named Asha (DeBose) living in the kingdom of Rosas, where she makes a passionate plea to the stars in a moment of need. She meets a living, magic fallen star, and together they face the kingdom's devious ruler, the sorcerer Magnifico (Pine).

Development of Wish began in 2018 but was not publicly disclosed until January 2022, when it was revealed that Lee was writing an original film at Disney Animation. In September 2022, the project was officially announced, with the title revealed alongside the involvement of DeBose and Tudyk. Buck and Veerasunthorn, who had worked with Lee on Frozen (2013) and Frozen II (2019) as co-director and story artist, were confirmed as directors the same month, with Moore later hired to join Lee in writing the screenplay. Julia Michaels and Benjamin Rice wrote the songs, while frequent Disney orchestrator Dave Metzger composed the score. Wish is inspired by Disney's centennial, tying together a theme of most Disney films: wishes coming true, and it is also noted to be the origin story for the "wishing star". The film's art style combines computer animation with the look of traditional animation.

Wish premiered at the El Capitan Theatre in Hollywood, Los Angeles, on November 8, 2023, and was theatrically released in the United States on November 22. It received mixed reviews and grossed roughly $255 million worldwide on a production budget of $175–200 million. Analysts considered it to be a box-office bomb, resulting in an estimated $131 million loss for the studio after accounting for income from streaming and home entertainment. On Disney+, it became the third most viewed premiere for a film from Walt Disney Animation Studios. The film was nominated for several awards, including the Golden Globe Award for Best Animated Feature Film.

== Plot ==
King Magnifico and his wife, Queen Amaya, establish the kingdom of Rosas on an island in the Mediterranean Sea. Having studied sorcery, Magnifico is able to grant the greatest desires of his subjects, but they have to give up the memory of their wishes to be sealed away and protected by the king until he can grant them. Once a month, at a ceremonial event, Magnifico chooses one wish to be granted.

Years later, 17-year-old Asha prepares to interview for the job of Magnifico's apprentice on the day of her grandfather Sabino's 100th birthday, hoping that Magnifico will grant Sabino's wish to inspire the next generation. The interview goes well until Asha requests for Sabino's wish to be granted, which Magnifico, rendered paranoid by the destruction of his family's land, declines for being too vague. Asha realizes Magnifico never intends to return the ungranted wishes to their owners, and when she questions his methods, Magnifico refuses to accept her apprenticeship.

Asha tries but fails to convince Sabino and her mother Sakina of the flaws in Magnifico's system. Distraught, she makes her own wish on a star, and to her surprise, the star descends from the sky in the form of an anthropomorphic star of light, which Asha names Star. Star's magic gives the forest animals, including Asha's pet goat Valentino, the ability to talk, and they tell her that all life is made of stardust. Encouraged, Asha enlists Star's help in retrieving her family's wishes. Everyone in the kingdom senses Star's presence, and Magnifico interprets it as a threat. Despite Amaya's pleas, he turns to a book of forbidden dark magic to maintain his position of power as his subjects begin to doubt his way of ruling.

Asha retrieves Sabino's wish and he is overjoyed to be able to remember it, but Magnifico arrives to arrest them, having been informed that Asha was responsible for Star's summoning. Corrupted by the dark magic, Magnifico intends to use Star's magic and Rosas's wishes to increase his own power, forcing Sabino and Sakina to flee to a nearby island while Asha, Star, and Valentino stay behind to free the citizens' wishes. One of Asha's friends, Simon, is revealed to be the one who sold her out to Magnifico, in hopes that his wish to become a knight would be granted. Magnifico grants the wish, but additionally bewitches Simon into being his henchman.

Asha rallies her other friends Dahlia, Gabo, Hal, Bazeema, Safi, and Dario to put an end to Magnifico's reign. Amaya also joins them, having discovered Magnifico's corruption. While her friends infiltrate Magnifico's study and open up the ceiling to free the wishes, Asha tries to distract Magnifico, only to be tricked by a disguised Simon, whom she defeats with the animals' help. The real Magnifico ascends the castle's tower, absorbing the power of every wish and trapping Star. Asha attempts to stop him but is easily overpowered as Magnifico blocks out the sky and immobilizes the citizens, preventing them from wishing on stars.

Unwilling to give up, Asha remembers the animals' message from before and encourages the citizens to make a wish about changing Rosas's future. The strength of their collective desire overpowers Magnifico, releasing the wishes from him and freeing Star. Magnifico's magic turns against him and traps him inside his staff's mirror, while the citizens regain their sealed wishes with a newfound appreciation of pursuing them.

Amaya becomes the sole ruler of Rosas, helping the citizens make their wishes come true on their own. A regretful Simon is forgiven by Asha and her friends. Star gifts Asha with a magic wand so that she can inspire people to keep dreaming before returning to the sky among the other stars.

== Voice cast ==
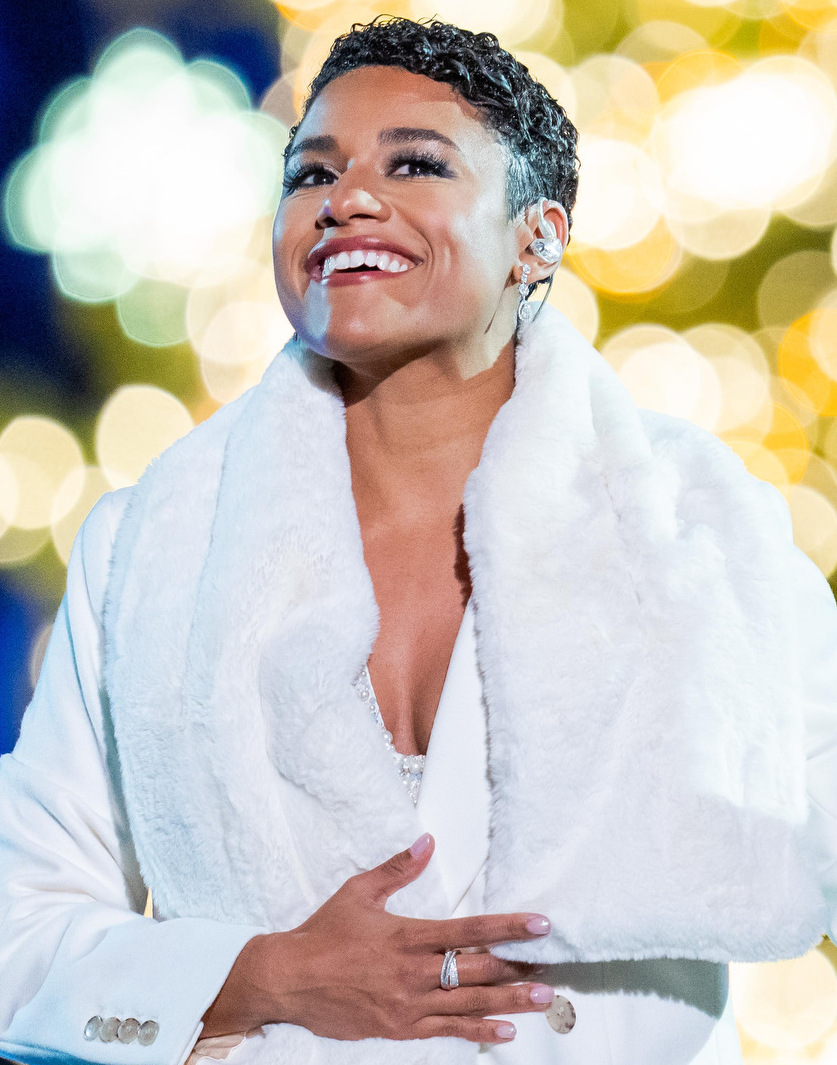
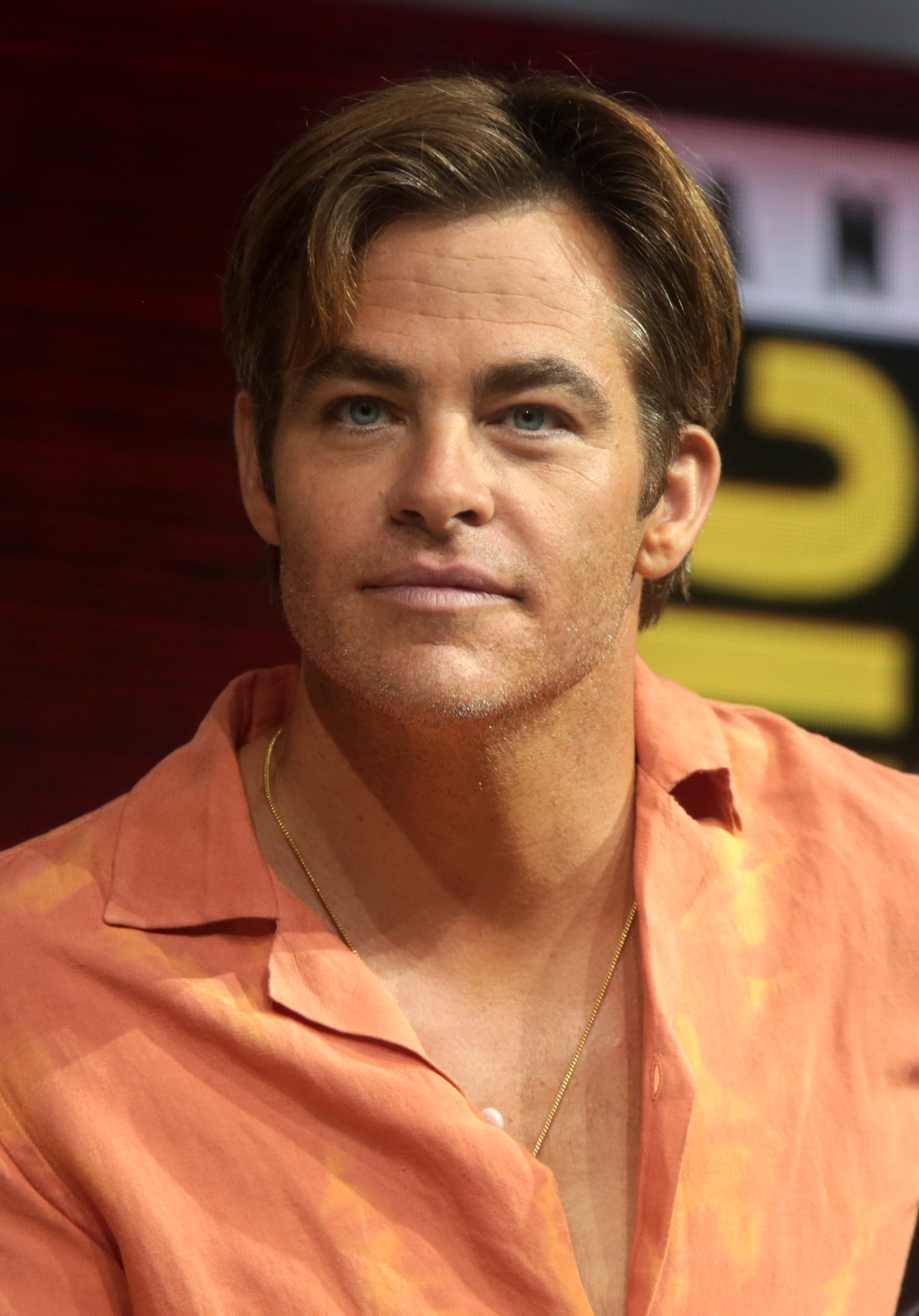
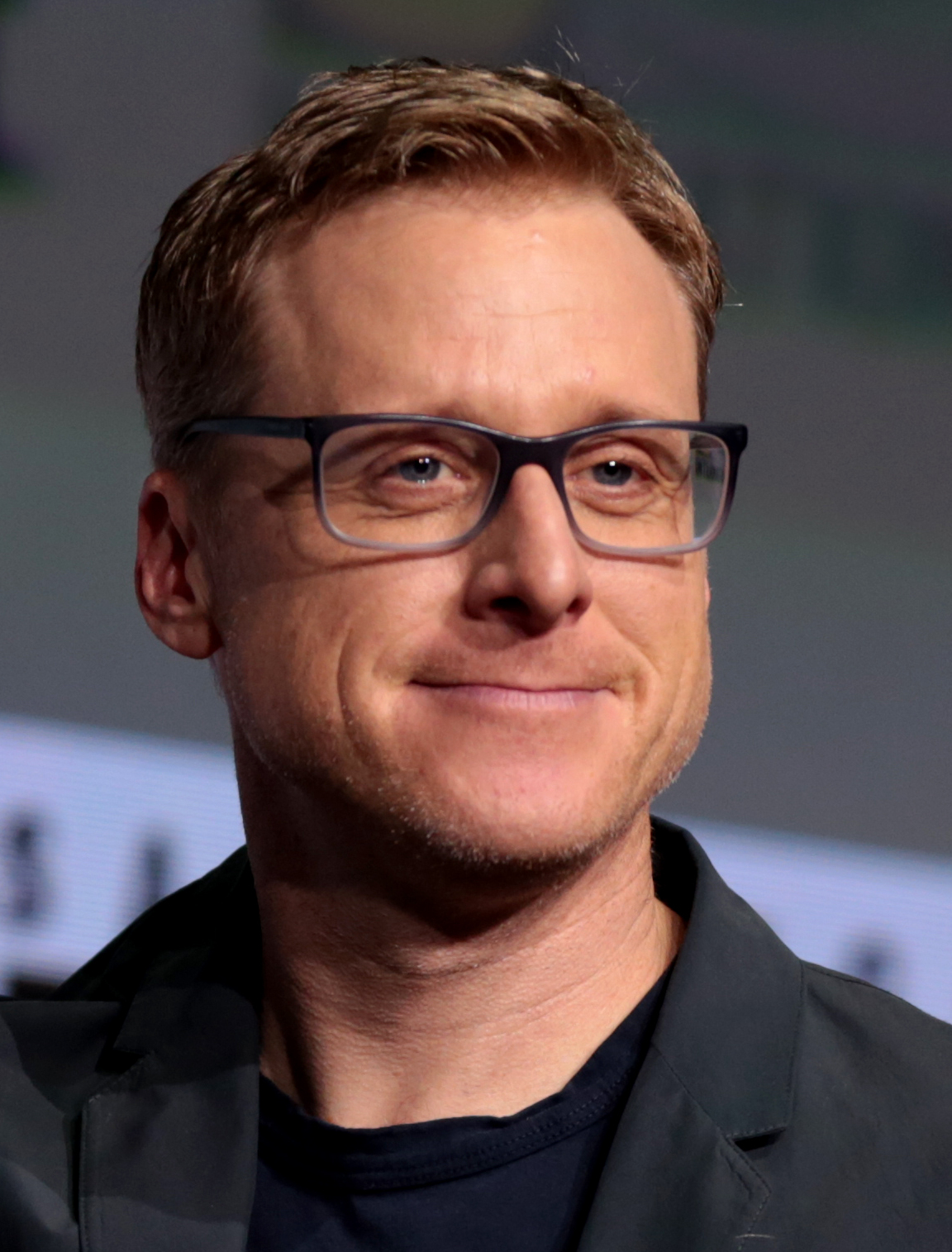
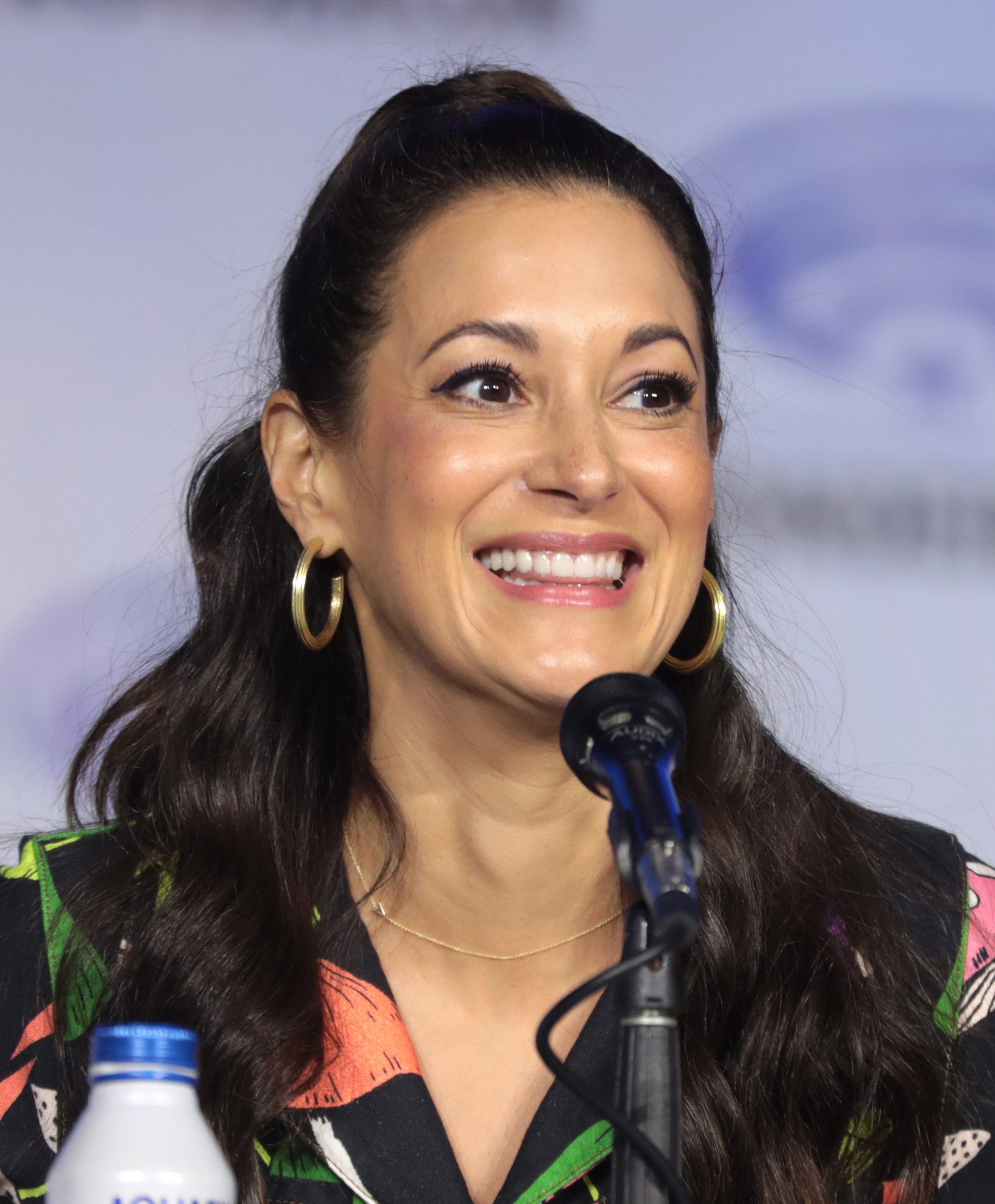
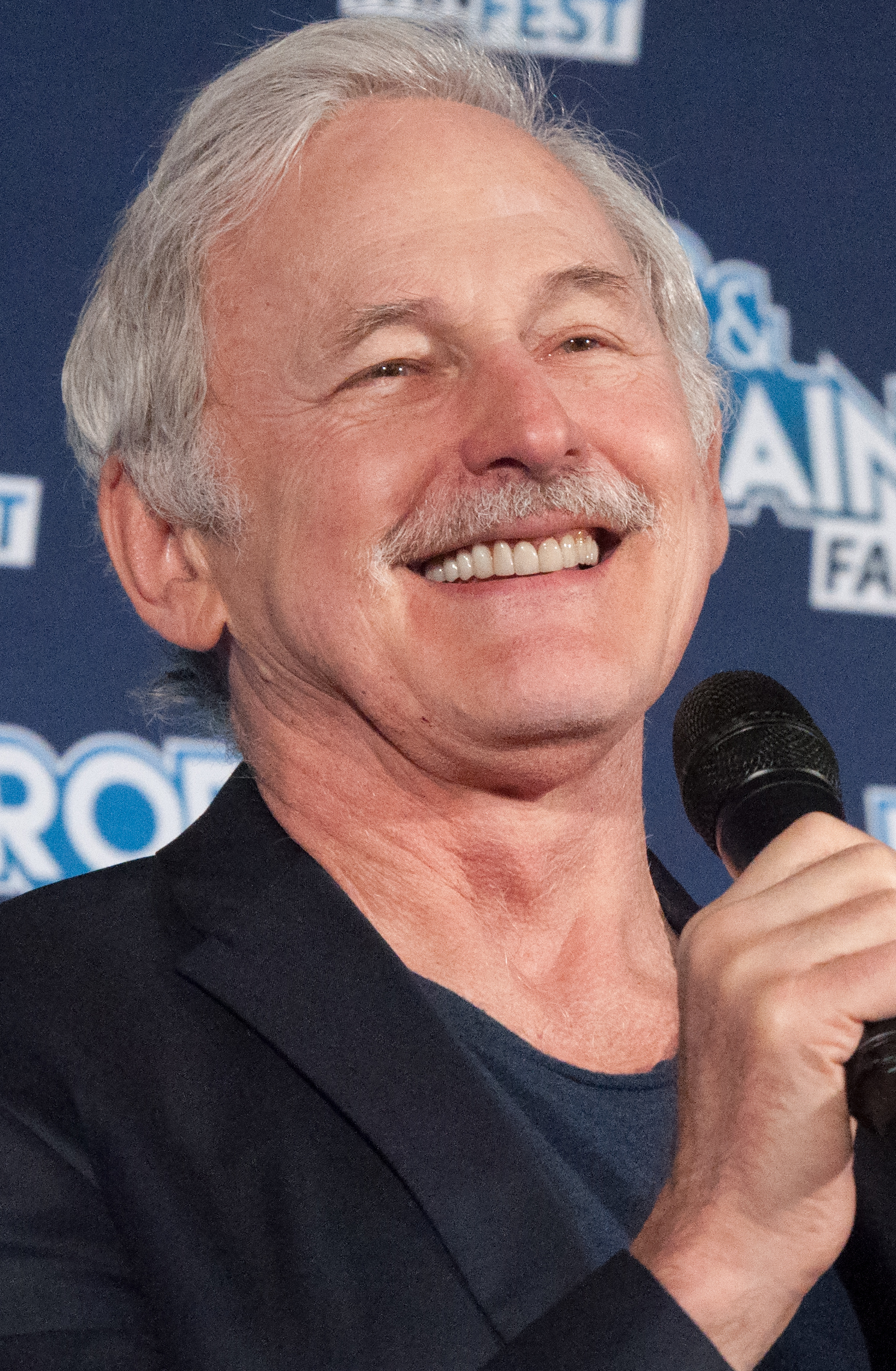
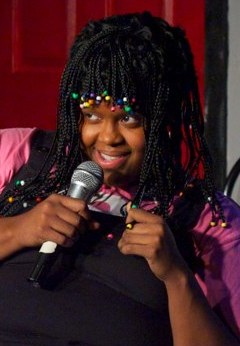
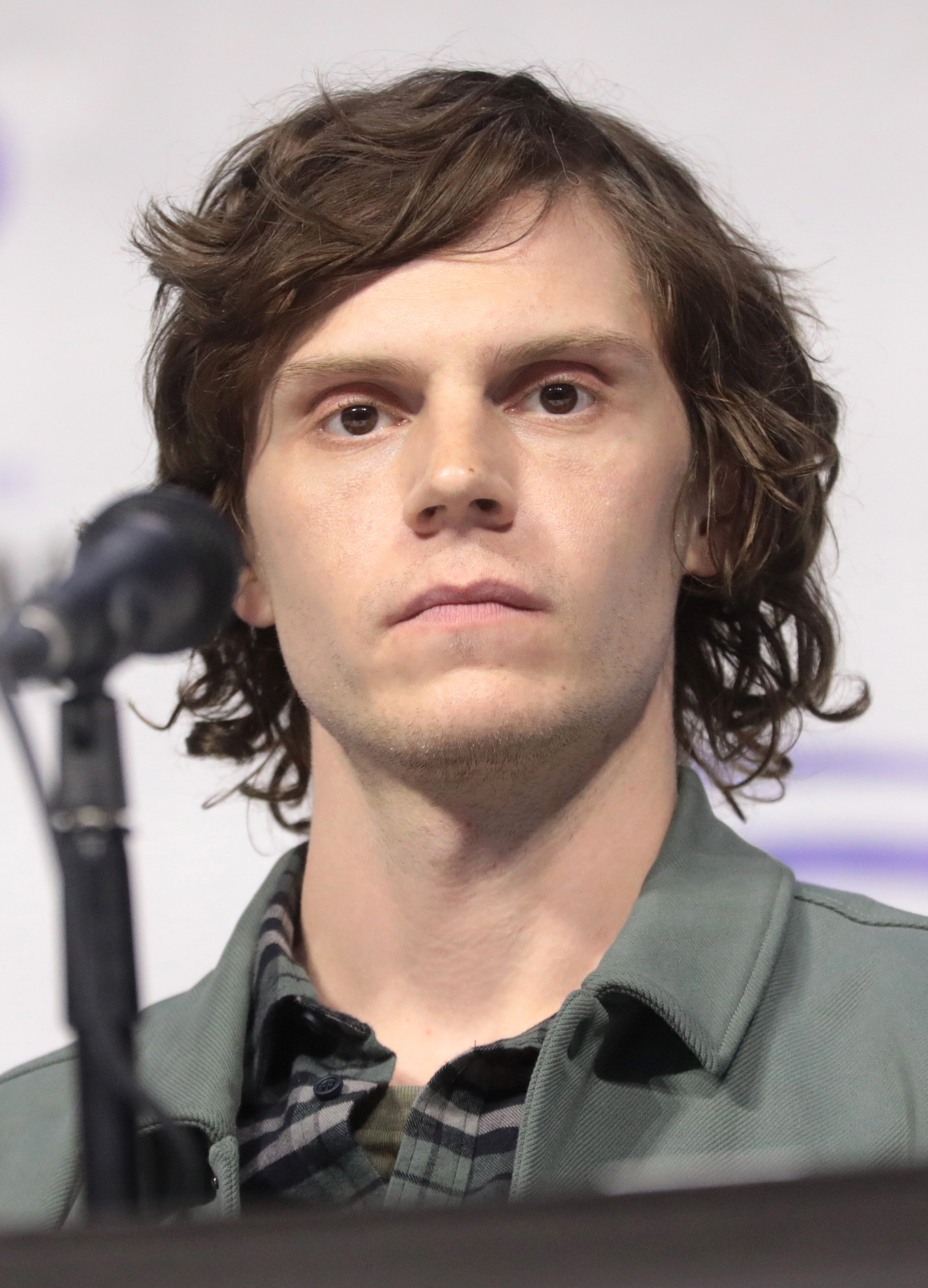
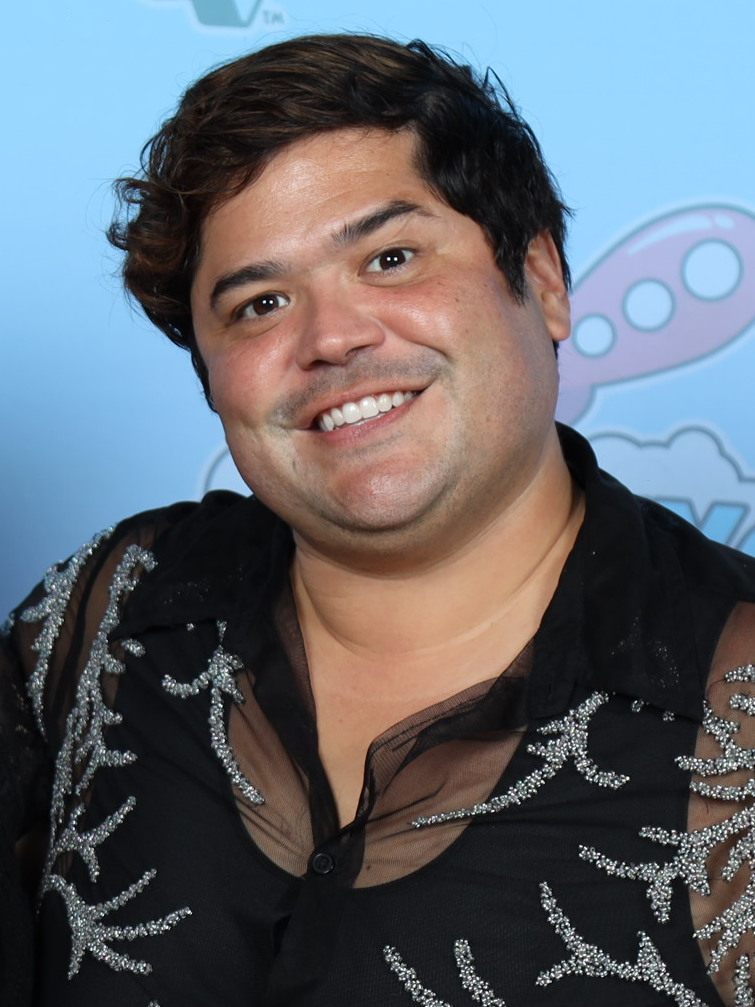
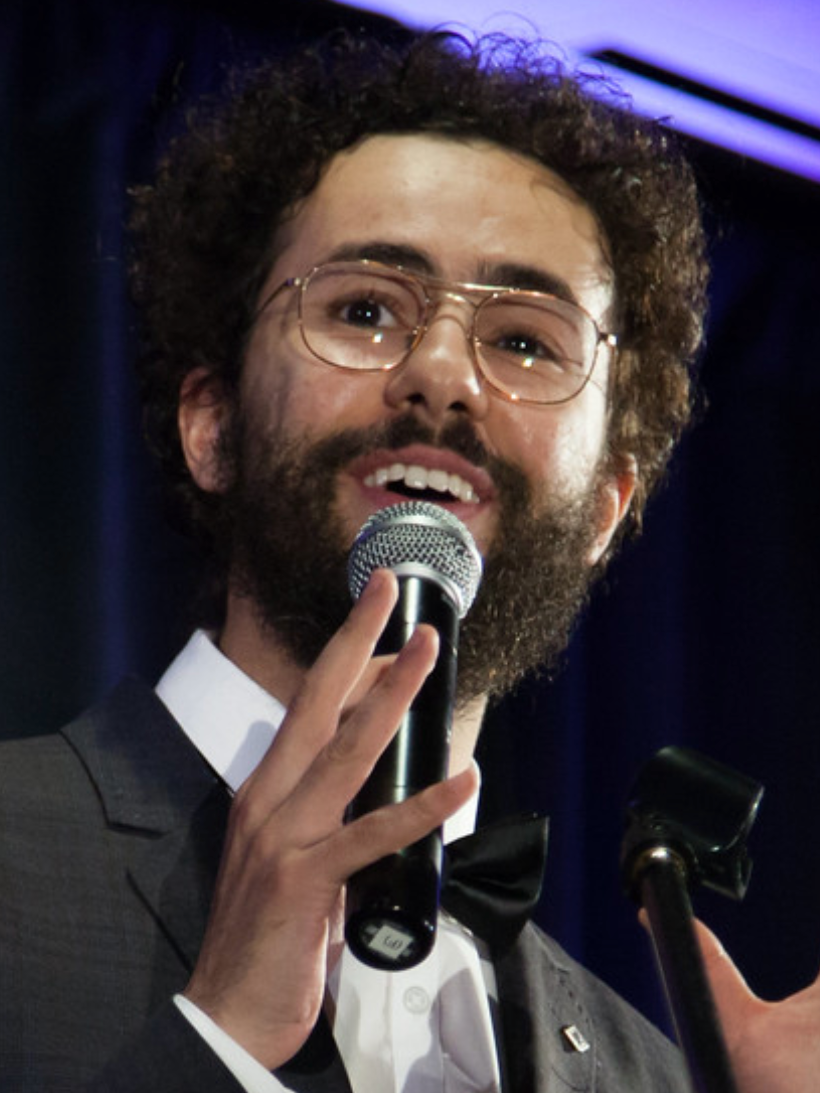
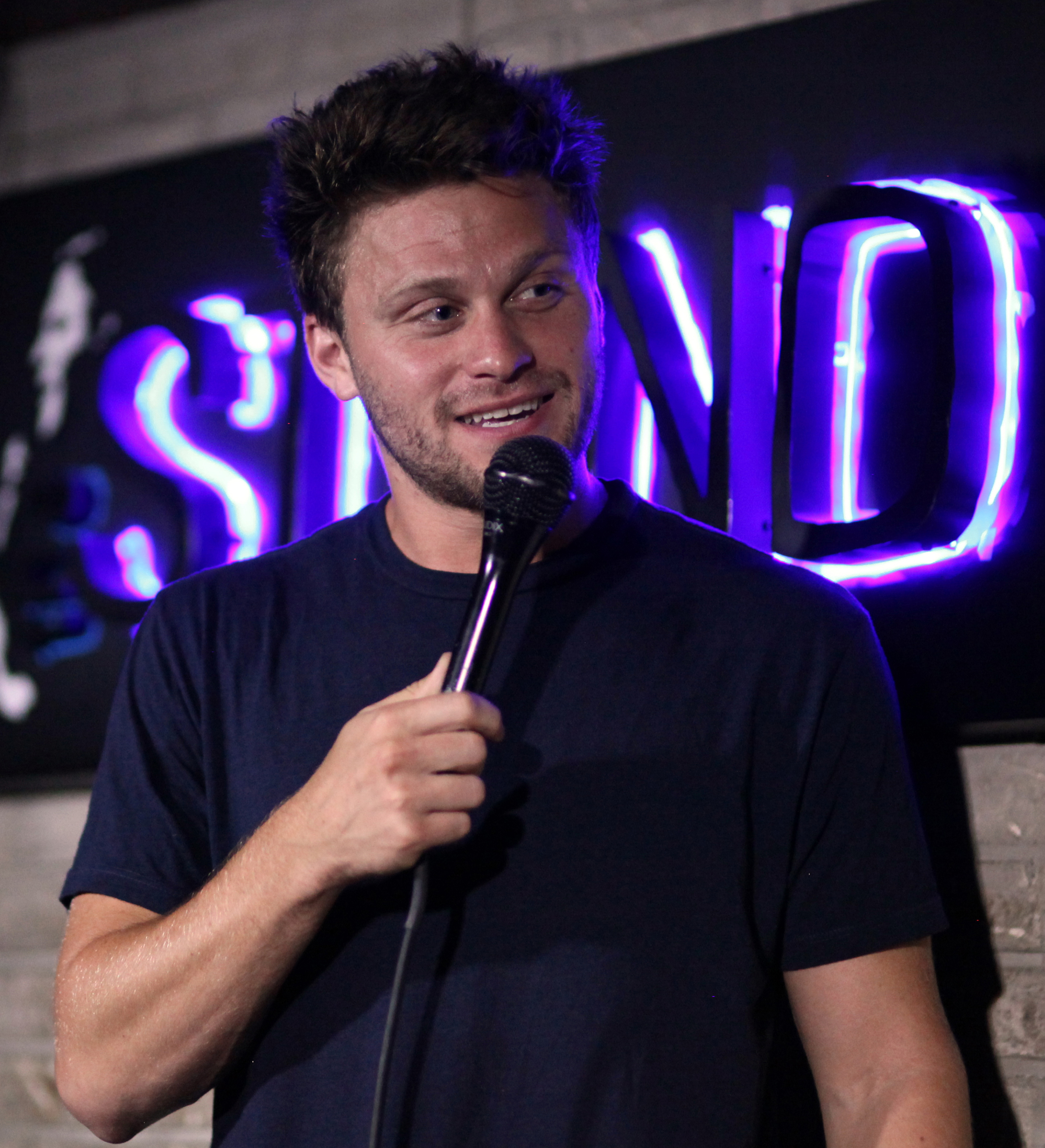
Left to right:
Top row: Ariana DeBose, Chris Pine, Alan Tudyk, Angelique Cabral and Victor Garber respectively play the roles of Asha, King Magnifico, Valentino, Queen Amaya and Sabino.
Bottom row: Natasha Rothwell, Evan Peters, Harvey Guillén, Ramy Youssef and Jon Rudnitsky respectively play the roles of Sakina, Simon, Gabo, Safi and Dario.
- Ariana DeBose as Asha, a 17-year-old girl who wishes upon a star to help save Rosas after sensing a coming darkness. Director Chris Buck says Asha is "energetic—an enthusiastic member of her community who proudly shows off this incredible place where she's grown up".
- Chris Pine as King Magnifico, the evil sorcerer king of Rosas who is the sole keeper of people's wishes. Writer Allison Moore says his motivations are not honorable, stating that "Magnifico seems to think wishes are just ideas. But they are a part of your heart—the very best part of your heart! Yet he's holding them inside these wish bubbles—hundreds of them—and most will remain there forever because that's how he controls the kingdom—by giving false hope".
- Alan Tudyk as Valentino, a goat whose wish to communicate comes true after Star's magic grants him the ability to talk.
- Angelique Cabral as Queen Amaya, King Magnifico's wife and the queen of Rosas.
- Victor Garber as Sabino, Asha's 100-year-old grandfather who is waiting to be granted his wish.
- Natasha Rothwell as Sakina, Asha's mother.
- Jennifer Kumiyama as Dahlia, Asha's best friend who is the royal baker and the unofficial leader of "The Teens". She was inspired by Doc from Snow White and the Seven Dwarfs.
- Harvey Guillén as Gabo, a boy who is cynical but has a heart of gold and is part of The Teens. He was inspired by Grumpy from Snow White and the Seven Dwarfs.
- Niko Vargas as Hal, a joyful girl who is part of The Teens. She was inspired by Happy from Snow White and the Seven Dwarfs.
- Evan Peters as Simon, a strong boy with a big heart who is part of The Teens. He was inspired by Sleepy from Snow White and the Seven Dwarfs.
- Della Saba as Bazeema, a shy girl who is part of The Teens. She was inspired by Bashful from Snow White and the Seven Dwarfs.
- Ramy Youssef as Safi, a boy who is plagued with allergies and is part of The Teens. He was inspired by Sneezy from Snow White and the Seven Dwarfs.
- Jon Rudnitsky as Dario, Asha's rosy-cheeked and wiggly-eared friend who is part of The Teens. He was inspired by Dopey from Snow White and the Seven Dwarfs.

Additional voice cast includes Keone Young as Mountain Climber, Tall Man Tourist, and Guard #1; Heather Matarazzo as Flying Woman; and Nasim Pedrad as Sania, a woman whose wish to make the finest dresses is granted by King Magnifico.

Singer and television presenter Rochelle Humes cameos in the UK version of the film as Rochelle, a villager who wishes to become the captain of a ship. Yvette Nicole Brown and James Monroe Iglehart have vocal cameos during "I'm a Star" and are credited as the featured singers of the Choir alongside Woody Buck.

== Production ==
=== Development ===
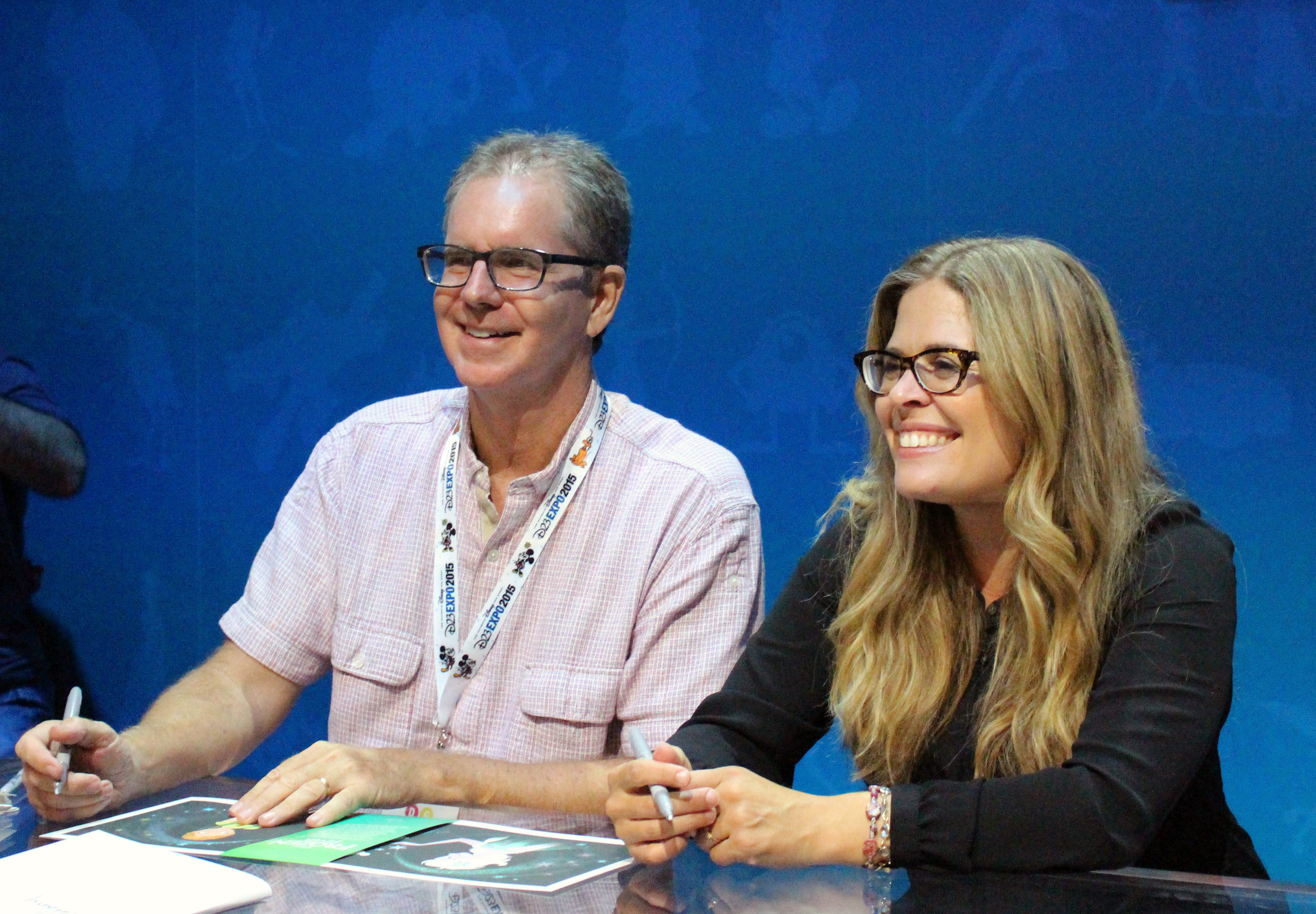
Co-director Chris Buck (left) and co-writer Jennifer Lee (right)

Wish began development in 2018, but it was not publicly disclosed until January 21, 2022, when it was reported that Walt Disney Animation Studios' chief creative officer Jennifer Lee was writing an original film at the studio.

On September 9, 2022, during the 2022 D23 Expo Presentation, Disney Animation announced the film's title, as well as that the directing team would consist of Chris Buck and Fawn Veerasunthorn, and Peter Del Vecho and Juan Pablo Reyes Lancaster-Jones as producers. Buck, Veerasunthorn, and Del Vecho had all worked with Lee on the Frozen franchise, as co-director, story artist, and producer, respectively. It was also announced that the art style would combine the look of Disney's traditional watercolor animation and computer animation, which the company utilizes in its modern period. Composer Dave Metzger cited Snow White and the Seven Dwarfs (1937) and Sleeping Beauty (1959) as the main sources of inspiration for the designs of the characters and setting, as well as the latter film being the source of the decision to present the film in the 2.55:1 aspect ratio. Veerasunthorn, who was making her feature directorial debut with this film, said that she was "excited about honoring Walt Disney with the feature. Our art and technology team would come together to figure out how to combine the 20th century illustration look that inspired Walt [Disney] with the CG technology we have now".

The film's animation was originally intended to be completely traditional, but it was later decided to be blended with computer-animation when 2D alone was considered, in the filmmakers' opinion, as having too many limitations in terms of camera movements and characterization.

The Art of Wish artbook revealed that Queen Amaya was originally going to be a villain alongside Magnifico, while Star was originally "a human character, part magical, part glowing, inspired a bit by Peter Pan". Additionally, several concepts and scenes were ultimately cut or altered from the finished film, including a scene where Asha and her family hide away in a village where the people write their wishes on trees and Sabino dies shortly after inspiring Asha to fight Magnifico, a chase scene through the forest where Star transformed into several creatures to escape Queen Amaya and her guards, and an alternate ending where Magnifico devoured wishes to become all-powerful and Asha, intending to stall him, attempted to pass Valentino off as Star. A scene of Sabino singing "A Wish Worth Making" after Asha recovers his wish was cut from the film late in development for unknown reasons.

=== Casting ===
On September 9, 2022, during the 2022 D23 Expo, Ariana DeBose and Alan Tudyk were announced to have been cast in the leading roles of Asha and Valentino, respectively. On April 26, 2023, at CinemaCon, it was announced that Chris Pine would voice King Magnifico. Lee said of Pine "as the most powerful person in the kingdom, King Magnifico needed to be played by someone who could give all the charm, cleverness and charisma to this magnanimous character, and Chris is beautifully bringing all of that and then some". On September 18, 2023, Angelique Cabral was announced as the voice of King Magnifico's wife, Queen Amaya. The rest of the cast was announced with the release of the full trailer.

== Music ==
Julia Michaels was announced to write lyrics and partial music to original songs for Wish at D23 Expo in September 2022. Work on the songs began the year before during the COVID-19 pandemic. By April 2023, Dave Metzger was confirmed to compose the film's score, while Benjamin Rice joined Michaels to write the songs by contributing additional music. At CinemaCon in April, Disney showed a clip of Asha singing the song "This Wish", which reporters from Deadline Hollywood described as "a very pretty, powerful anthem". On October 18, 2023, it was revealed that JP Saxe had also joined the songwriting team to make additional music for the song "This Wish".

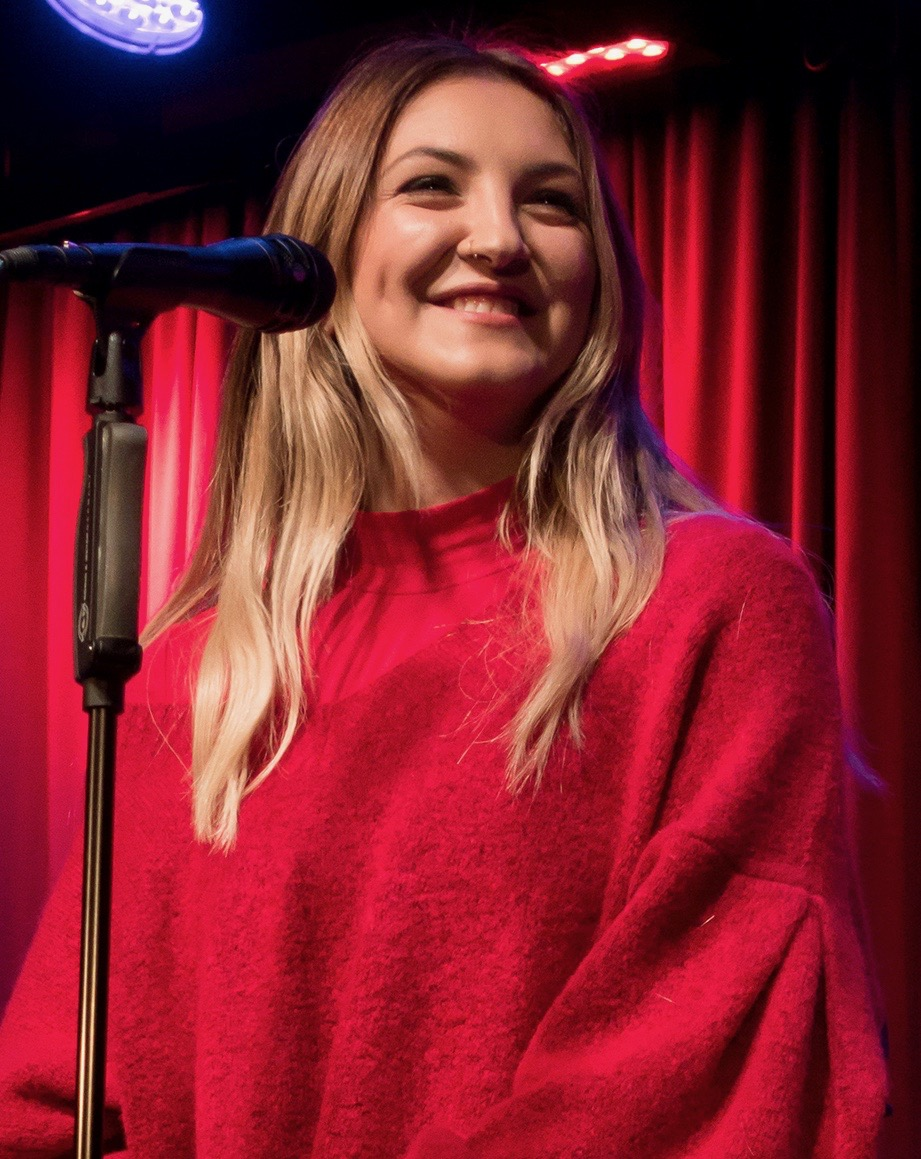
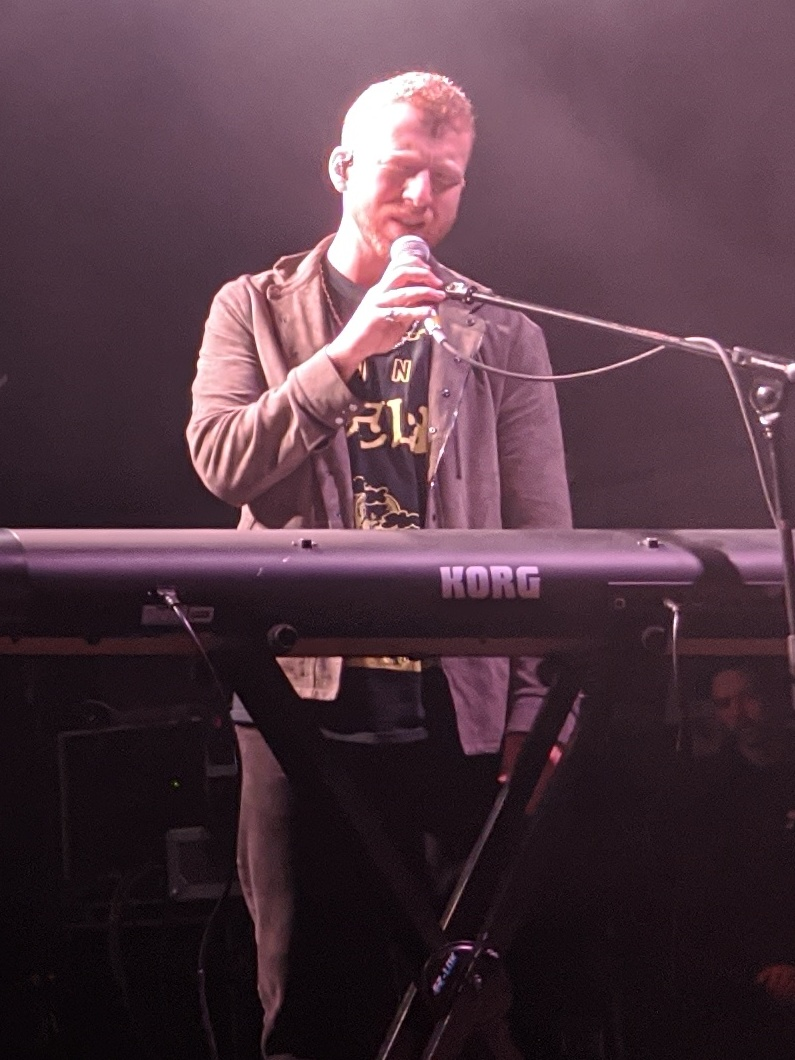
Songwriters Julia Michaels (left) and JP Saxe (right)

For the film's underscore and orchestrations, Metzger incorporated "ethnic percussion (such as castanets and finger cymbals) as well as instruments from the Mediterranean region such as guitars to bring color to the score and evoke that kingdom". Also featured in the film is "When You Wish Upon a Star", the signature song of The Walt Disney Company, first introduced in Pinocchio (1940). To incorporate the song into the underscore, Metzger utilized the song's first five notes at the request of Chris Buck, saying that the filmmakers "wanted something different. I played with an ethereal texture. So, we go from the Walt Disney Pictures 100th anniversary logo and transition into the land of Rosas and Wish".

The October 16, 2023 (the official 100th anniversary of the Disney studio) episode of Good Morning America announced that songs from the soundtrack would be releasing every Wednesday beginning on October 18, with "This Wish". The soundtrack was released on November 17, 2023, by Walt Disney Records, followed by an extended deluxe edition featuring Metzger's score, instrumental versions of the songs and demo recordings with Michaels on November 22, 2023.

== Release ==
Wish had its world premiere at the El Capitan Theatre in Hollywood, Los Angeles, on November 8, 2023, just hours after the end of the 2023 SAG-AFTRA strike was announced for 12:01 a.m. the next day, with Chris Buck, Fawn Veerasunthorn, Jennifer Lee and Disney CEO Bob Iger in attendance and Asha, Mickey Mouse and Minnie Mouse walking the blue carpet in the cast's place, while featuring a live drone show above the theater. It was theatrically released in the United States on November 22. The United Kingdom premiere took place at the Odeon Luxe Leicester Square on November 20, 2023. On February 16, 2023, following the commercial failures of the company's Strange World and Pixar's Lightyear (both 2022), Disney reportedly considered extending the theatrical windows for both Wish and Pixar's Elemental in hopes of bringing families back to theaters. On June 15, 2023, at the Annecy International Animation Film Festival, twenty minutes of footage from Wish were screened. Early access screenings of the film took place on November 18, 2023, coinciding with the 95th birthday of Mickey Mouse and Minnie Mouse, for which a special brand spot commemorating it was attached to these screenings.

In July 2023, it was reported that Disney was considering postponing some of their 2023 releases, including Wish, due to the 2023 Hollywood labor disputes.

=== Marketing ===
On the April 27, 2023 episode of Good Morning America, Make-A-Wish recipient Jazz Smith met the film's star Ariana DeBose; it was later revealed she would attend the Hollywood premiere of Wish with a friend and visit Disneyland Resort. The film's first trailer was screened outside Times Square Studios afterwards.

On September 29, 2023, Disney reported that the official trailer for the film became the most viewed trailer for any of their animated films since Frozen II (2019), earning over 66.5 million views globally on all online platforms, surpassing the 20 million views of the teaser trailer released earlier in the year and becoming the most viewed trailer for a Disney film on TikTok. The film's originality, characters, music and King Magnifico's position in the story as the film's villain were praised on social media.

Lego released three sets based on scenes from the film on October 1, 2023. Funko and Mattel also released toys and figurines based on the film's characters on October 4. On October 4, Disney announced the "Wish Together" campaign in partnership with the Make-A-Wish Foundation in which Disney would donate 10% of the sale price of each individual item of merchandise from the film up to $1 million to the foundation. At Destination D23 in September 2023, it was announced that Asha would be doing meet-and-greets at the Disney Parks throughout November to promote the film, including Epcot, Disneyland and Disneyland Park (Paris). The film's cast was unable to take part in the Destination D23 event due to the restrictions imposed by the 2023 SAG-AFTRA strike.

On December 19, 2023, a collaboration project with the movie Spy × Family Code: White was announced in Japan. A parody poster illustration featuring Spy × Family series' characters Anya and Bond Forger, which mirrors the Japanese theatrical release poster of Wish, and a combination trailer video were also released on the same day.

=== Home media ===
Wish was released for digital platforms on January 23, 2024, followed by Blu-ray, DVD, and 4K UHD on March 12, 2024, by Walt Disney Studios Home Entertainment. The film was released on Disney+ on April 3, 2024.

In the United States, Wish ranked No. 10 on Apple TV and No. 5 on Vudu for the week ending February 4, 2024. The film later secured the No. 10 spot on Vudu and No. 9 on Google Play for the week of February 12–18. In the United Kingdom, it debuted at No. 2 on the Official Film Chart, based on digital downloads. Wish remained in the Top 10 for six consecutive weeks, holding the No. 9 position as of March 6. Following its disc release on March 12, the film debuted at No. 4 on the March 2024 physical media sales chart, according to Circana's VideoScan tracking service.

Following its debut on Disney+, Wish garnered 13.2 million views in five days, becoming the third most-watched streaming premiere for a Walt Disney Animation Studios film, following Encanto (2021) and Frozen II (2019). Nielsen Media Research, which records streaming viewership on U.S. television screens, calculated that Wish was watched for 1.18 billion minutes from April 1–7, making it the most-streamed film of the week. It became the first film on Disney+ since Elemental (2023) to surpass one billion minutes of viewing time. The following week, from April 8–14, the film accumulated 642 million minutes of watch time, once again ranking as the most-streamed film. Wish accumulated 388 million minutes of watch time from April 15–21, becoming the fifth most-streamed film that week. For the week of April 22–28, it was the fourth most-streamed film, with 254 million minutes of viewing time.

== Reception ==
=== Box office ===
Wish grossed $64 million in the United States and Canada, and $191 million in other territories, for a worldwide total of $255 million. Deadline Hollywood calculated the film lost the studio $131 million, when factoring together all expenses and revenues.

In the United States and Canada, Wish was released alongside Napoleon and the expansion of Saltburn, and was initially projected to gross $45–50 million from 3,900 theaters over its five-day Thanksgiving opening weekend. The film made $8.3 million on its first day, including $2.3 million from Tuesday night previews. After Thanksgiving Day ($3.9 million) and Black Friday ($8 million), projections were lowered to $32–33 million. It went on to debut to $19.5 million (and a total of $31.7 million over the five days), finishing in third behind holdover The Hunger Games: The Ballad of Songbirds & Snakes and Napoleon. Variety attributed the low opening to a lack of social media marketing and divided word-of-mouth, but suggested that the film could leg out as Pixar's Elemental did earlier in the year. The film finished in fifth in the subsequent two weeks, with grosses of $7.4 million in its second weekend, and $5.3 million in its third weekend.

=== Critical response ===
On the review aggregator website Rotten Tomatoes, 48% of 230 critics' reviews are positive, with an average rating of 5.6/10. The website's consensus reads: "Wish earns some tugs at the heartstrings with the way it warmly references many of the studio's classics, but nostalgia's no substitute for genuine storytelling magic – no matter how beautifully animated it might be." It was the first Walt Disney Animation Studios film to be classified as "Rotten" on the site since Chicken Little (2005). Metacritic, which uses a weighted average, assigned the film a score of 47 out of 100, based on 45 critics, indicating "mixed or average" reviews, making it the lowest-rated film from Walt Disney Animation Studios on the platform. Audiences polled by CinemaScore gave the film an average grade of "A−" on an A+ to F scale, while those polled by PostTrak gave it a 71% overall positive score.

Kate Erbland of IndieWire praised the film, saying "As Disney celebrates its 100th year, Wish serves as a throwback to the past, a celebration of the present, and a gentle push into the future." Brian Truitt of USA Today gave it three stars out of four and wrote that the film "entertains and unabashedly owns being a safe paean to old-school Disney, shamelessly aiming for all your nostalgic feels. And it makes no difference who you are." John Nugent of Empire called it "An appropriate tribute to Disney, by itself. It hardly breaks any ground—it's simply there to celebrate the ground the studio was built on," but felt that "the jokes largely land a little flatly, to be appreciated by only the youngest audiences (although props must be given to the cadre of breakdancing chickens, a genuine highlight)." Sarah El-Mahmoud of CinemaBlend awarded the film 4 out of 5 stars, writing, "From gorgeous watercolor-like settings, to adorable talking animals, to earworm pop songs, Wish goes to the Disney mainstays." Kristen Lopez of TheWrap called it "a darling film with fantastic music and amazing voice performances, but the story does feel a bit like a house of cards waiting to be poked." Johnny Oleksinski of the New York Post gave the film a 1.5 out of 4 rating and said, "As far as birthday celebrations go, Wish is about as special as throwing your "I'm a century old!" bash at a rest-stop Arby's." Kevin Maher of The Times gave a rating of 1 out of 4, saying, "Just like The Marvels, Wish is an emotionally inert and personality-free movie that appears to have been assembled from the outside in." Bill Goodykoontz of The Arizona Republic wrote that "What saves the film from being nothing but a rehash are DeBose, whose singing voice unsurprisingly shines, and Pine (who sang in Into the Woods), who makes an excellent villain, as well as some of the songs, most of which they're involved in."

Michael O'Sullivan of The Washington Post gave 2 stars out of 5 in a review: "what Wish feels like at times: not a movie made by filmmakers with an original vision, but one assembled by focus group, with an eye more on fan service than on fresh ideas. [...] It all feels familiar, which is another word for comforting. And Wish, however recycled it may be, is at least that: warm, funny-ish and with its heart in the right place." Damon Wise of Deadline Hollywood's review was mixed, saying that "Disney used to make this kind of film all the time, but now the studio seems a bit bamboozled as to how to do it in the modern age, which might explain why it lifts quite a lot from DreamWorks' Shrek—starting with a tongue-in-cheek fairytale-book opening—and takes its musical direction from The Greatest Showman, which means lots of tub-thumping numbers that sound like variations on a theme from a YA adaptation of Les Misérables. Like that film's bombastic "This Is Me," every song here feels like an overreaction, and the verbosity of the lyrics ("hesitations" rhymes with "reservations") jars with the simplicity of the animation and its Snow White palette." He concluded that "Thankfully, it doesn't outstay its welcome, but to cap 100 years with a few throwaway quips about Bambi, Mary Poppins and Peter Pan (plus a whole roll call of more recent characters during the end credits) seems to be a hell of a disappointing way to capitalize on such a formidable back catalog." Lovia Gyarkye of The Hollywood Reporter wrote that "Even during its more successful moments, Wish's magic falls flat. The film is weighed down by its purpose: to revel in Disney nostalgia while soaring into the future." Owen Gleiberman of Variety wrote "The strategy behind Wish seems to be: If we do an homage to enchantment, the audience will be enchanted. True magic, however, can't be recycled." Tim Grierson of Screen International wrote that the film "...is a strained animated musical which overtly references the company's most beloved films, a strategy that mostly exposes how singular the studio's productions used to be." Amy Nicholson of The New York Times wrote that "Oddly—and rather fascinatingly—this is a film about a spiritual revolution. Can Asha, a humanist, convince the islanders to reject the man in the embroidered robe who preaches that he alone is a conduit for miracles?"

=== Accolades ===
Award	Date of ceremony	Category	Recipient(s)	Result	Ref.
Alliance of Women Film Journalists	January 3, 2024	Best Animated Female	Ariana DeBose	Nominated	
Astra Film Awards	January 6, 2024	Best Voice-Over Performance	Ariana DeBose	Nominated	
Astra Film Awards	January 6, 2024	Best Original Song	"This Wish" – Julia Michaels, Benjamin Rice, and JP Saxe	Nominated	
Black Reel Awards	January 16, 2024	Outstanding Voice Performance	Ariana DeBose	Nominated	
Critics' Choice Movie Awards	January 14, 2024	Best Animated Feature	Wish	Nominated	
Critics' Choice Movie Awards	January 14, 2024	Best Song	"This Wish" – Julia Michaels, Benjamin Rice, and JP Saxe	Nominated	
Golden Globe Awards	January 7, 2024	Best Animated Feature Film	Wish	Nominated	
Hollywood Music in Media Awards	November 15, 2023	Original Song – Animated Film	"This Wish" – Julia Michaels, Benjamin Rice, and JP Saxe	Nominated	
Visual Effects Society Awards	February 21, 2024	Emerging Technology Award	Brent Burley, Daniel Teece, Brian J. Green (for Dynamic Screen Space Textures for Coherent Stylization)	Nominated	
Nickelodeon Kids' Choice Awards	July 13, 2024	Favorite Female Voice from an Animated Movie	Ariana DeBose	Nominated	

== See also ==
- List of films about witchcraft
