= Jennifer Kumiyama =

U.S. actor singer advocate movies stage

Jennifer Kumiyama is an American actor, singer and disability rights activist living in Long Beach, California. She has performed in feature films, television and on stage. She is the Citywide Accessibility Coordinator for the City of Long Beach.

== Early life ==
Kumiyama was born February 21, 1980 in Riverside, California to Marilynn Pace and Eddie Kumiyama. She has Arthrogryposis and uses a wheelchair daily.

In 1985 the family moved to Long Beach, California. Then in 1990 they moved to Fontana, California where Kumiyama graduated from A. B. Miller High School in 1998. She studied voice training at Long Beach City College and the California State University, Long Beach.

== Entertainment career ==
In 2000 Kumiyama began a career in entertainment with an appearance on the Popstars 2 television show by Warner Bros. In 2002 she joined the cast of Aladdin: A Musical Spectacular at the Disney California Adventure Theme Park. She spent 13 years with the live show before it closed in 2016 and was the first Disney actor to perform onstage in a wheelchair.

Kumiyama performed the role of Carmen in Fox Searchlight’s 2011 Oscar-nominated movie The Sessions. The film's plot involves a man with polio who wants to explore intimacy for the first time with a surrogate lover.

In 2022 Kumiyama voiced the character Dahlia, the royal baker, in Disney's animated feature film Wish.

== Disability advocacy ==
Beginning in 2014 through 2016, Kumiyama served as a commissioner for the Long Beach Citizens’ Advisory Commission on Disability. The nine-member commission, which is appointed by the city's mayor and confirmed by the city council, compiles information, reviews studies and data, and advises city government on issues concerning the disabled community.

Kumiyama won the Ms. Wheelchair California title in 2010. The following year she was awarded the first runner up to Ms. Wheelchair America.

The Long Beach Disability Pride organization was founded by Kumiyama in 2002. Currently she works as the Citywide Accessibility Coordinator for the city of Long Beach in the office of the city manager.
