= King Magnifico =

Disney villain character

- Wish character
- First appearance: Wish (2023)
- Created by: Jennifer Lee; Chris Buck; Fawn Veerasunthorn; Allison Moore
- Voiced by: Chris Pine

In-universe information
- Title: King Magnifico of Rosas
- Weapon: Magic staff
- Spouse: Queen Amaya
- Home: Kingdom of Rosas

King Magnifico is a fictional character and the main antagonist of the animated film Wish (2023) produced by Walt Disney Animation Studios. The concept was created by Jennifer Lee and Chris Buck. Lee then wrote the screenplay with Allison Moore. Magnifico is voiced by Chris Pine. He is a sorcerer who uses magic to control the wishes of his subjects. Beginning as a seemingly charming and benevolent king of the fictional kingdom of Rosas, Magnifico is revealed to be vain, controlling, and tyrannical after his motives are questioned by Asha (Ariana DeBose), the film's heroine.

Lee conceived the film as a 100-year anniversary celebration of the studio with the aim to make a homage to previous Disney villains. It originated in conversations between Lee and Buck while they were working together on Frozen II. Magnifico was designed to be a relatable character whose desire for power causes his descent into madness over the course of the film. The filmmakers wanted him to be a layered character rather than being an evil villain from the outset. The darkening nature of his character and his transition into villainy is expressed in the song "This Is the Thanks I Get?!".

The character received a mixed critical response. Some critics hailed Magnifico as a return to classic Disney villains, with praise for Pine's vocals. Conversely, the character received criticism for having few defining traits, while other critics disliked his lack of character development and backstory.

== Development ==
=== Concept and creation ===
In 2018, Jennifer Lee, chief creative officer and writer at Walt Disney Animation Studios, conceived the idea of producing a film for the studio's 100th anniversary while working with Chris Buck on Frozen II (2019). Buck was interested and collated stills from every Disney film. Realising that there are many examples of Disney characters who wish on a star, they decided to use this as the theme of the film. Lee worked with Allison Moore to write the screenplay. She said that in addition to celebrating the history of the studio, the writers wanted to create an original fairytale as a "nod to the future". Producers Peter Del Vecho and Juan Pablo Reyes Lancaster Jones discussed classic Disney elements including creating a classic villain. They knew that the film would be a musical from the early stages of development. As they were creating a fairytale, the animators referenced early animated films, such as Snow White and the Seven Dwarfs (1937) by using a painted, storybook visual style of animation. Earlier drafts for the film originally had King Magnifico sharing the role of main antagonist with his wife Queen Amaya, who in a typical Disney Villain tradition, would have owned an evil pet, a cat named Charo. This depiction of Magnifico and Amaya was described by art director of characters Bill Schwab as a "powerful crime family couple" like Tony and Carmela Soprano from the HBO television series The Sopranos (1999-2007).

=== Characterisation ===
According to Lee, the initial idea for King Magnifico began with creating a homage to classic Disney villains but the writers wrestled with how to define that. The studio had spent a decade exploring other types of antagonists and so she had never had the chance to develop a classic villain. Lee said that it was particularly challenging to create Magnifico as a unique character. It was also necessary to create a villain that the audience could understand rather than just being inherently evil. The writers wanted to ensure that from the first frame of the film the audience is able to follow Magnifico's journey and relate to him, rather than present him as a fully formed villain from the beginning. In addition, it was difficult for the writers to understand where to stop making him relatable to avoid creating a character similar to a protagonist. She felt that having the ability to understand the character's philosophy, even if it is disagreeable, makes him more exciting. Co-director Fawn Veerasunthorn said that throughout the entire film, the team aimed to make the audience feel conflicted about whether to love or hate the character. Buck wanted to convey the idea that Magnifico is admired but also evil, so they decided to give him an interesting backstory to add more complexity to his character.

Lee said that Wish centers around the concept of the corrupting influence of power. King Magnifico begins as a benevolent ruler who is driven to build something aspirational after experiencing the trauma of his own wish destroyed in childhood. His transition to evil is the result of his own choices and when he is challenged by Asha he begins to show the flaws in his character. She said that these challenges reveal the nature of his character, "It's not your greatest moments, it's your toughest moments and the choices you make". According to Lee, Magnifico tried to avoid feeling the pain of his childhood by trying to be in control of everything. She hoped that on multiple viewings of the film, the audience would see more about his motivations and choices. She said that each time he is challenged he could choose a different path and this makes him a "fun villain". Lee felt that it was important to have the protagonist and the villain completely aligned in their philosophies at the start of the film but then explore how disagreement leads them to make very different choices. Veerasunthorn said that both Asha and Magnifico understand that the wishes are special, but they have very different approaches to protecting them. Unlike Asha, Magnifico fails to see that the beauty of the wish is not just in the moment it is granted, but in the way that it motivates the wisher to move forward on their journey. This difference is ultimately the breaking point between Magnifico and Asha.

Magnifico's two songs were designed to be very different to show the different sides of his character. While "This Is the Thanks I Get?!" was designed to convey him as a powerful villain, the duet "At All Costs" was written to show how he and Asha were aligned with each other. Songwriter Julia Michaels said that she wanted to write a really beautiful song that could be played at a wedding as the film does not feature a love song. She wrote the song to express the heroine's and the villain's emotional alignment and show how both characters see the beauty in the wishes but have very different approaches: "one from a very selfless standpoint and one from a selfish standpoint". For "This Is the Thanks I Get?!" Michaels purposefully created a song that diverged from the dark tone of earlier Disney villain songs because she felt that Magnifico had the feel of "next door neighbour Dad" being charming and charismatic but becoming increasingly narcissistic. She decided to begin the song with a fun and upbeat tone to avoid revealing him as a villain from the start, but then made the song increasingly darker until he finally emerges "fully in his narcissistic, ominous, villainous power".

=== Design ===
"Magnifico flips a lot of tropes. In terms of design, he should be the most impossibly handsome Disney villain that anyone has ever seen."

— Bill Schwab, art director of characters

According to The Art of Wish, King Magnifico is the only Disney villain, except for Prince Hans in Frozen (2013), to be designed in off-white clothing instead of black or dark colours. Schwab said that he was designed to convey an imposing physical presence and elegant figure. His features were created with a triangular form to accentuate his handsomeness and perfect hair. The animators drew inspiration from actors, athletes and public figures for Magnifico's appearance and his design went through numerous changes during the design process. Various experiments around the character's appearance included decisions over whether he would have a beard, if he would have brown or white hair and how to decorate his robe. His final design reflects the formal architecture of his kingdom. The designers used vertical, elongated shapes inspired by medieval architecture found in buildings and sculpture such as cathedrals. His costume was inspired by medieval and nineteenth century illustrations. In addition, his robe was decorated with stars, while his jacket features the elements of fire, water, earth and air and also the zodiac signs.

Designing Magnifico's castle was challenging due to it not being the home of the film's hero but villain, with Buck feeling that the abode looming high above the kingdom's houses and directing all eyes to the monarch shows Magnifico's power over the city and narcissism. Art director of environments David Womersley loved using its architecture to display Magnifico's power, with its stone walls and towers being as much a statement of authority and protection much like how medieval castles sought to assert royalty's powers, leading the crew to develop a "Magnifico style" consisting of aggressive shapes of triangles and angles while inspiring themselves on Torre del Oro in Seville, Spain; the castle's backstory was that the castle was built long before Magnifico was born, yet he superimposed himself upon taking over Rosas much like historical rulers. Magnifico's book of forbidden magic, whose design was made ancient when it was decided that Magnifico discovered his ancient secret lair while renovating his study and came up very late in production due to the lair being a late idea, is an homage to the book of spells owned by the Evil Queen in Snow White and the Seven Dwarfs while the dragon motif that encircles its gem at the cover was an homage to Maleficent in Sleeping Beauty (1959).

=== Voice ===
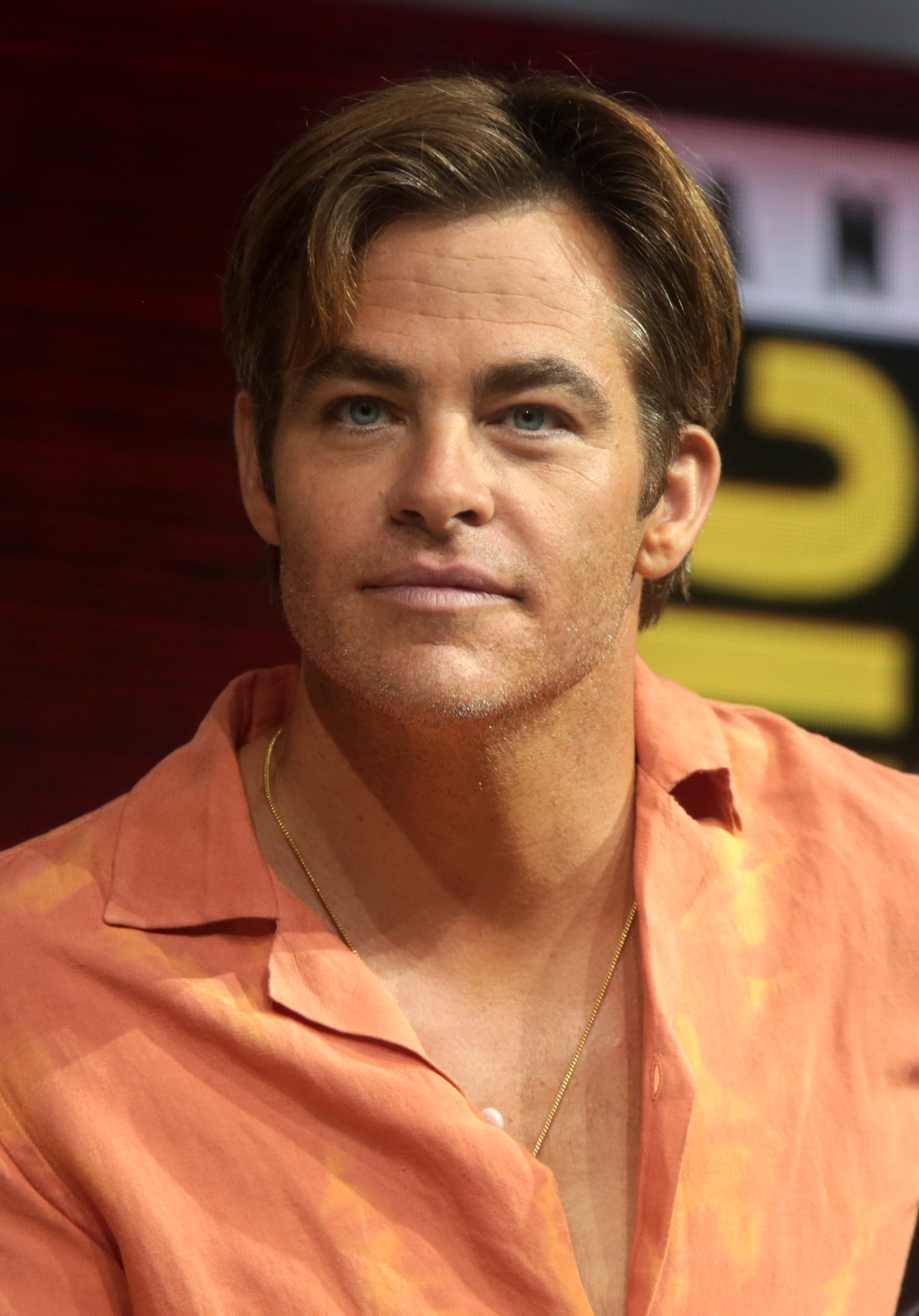
Chris Pine is the voice of King Magnifico in Wish.

Chris Pine was announced as the voice actor for King Magnifico at CinemaCon on 26 April 2023. Lancaster Jones said that casting Magnifico was difficult and involved trying to match a picture of the character to the right voice. When the team first tested Pine’s voice to the character's image, they immediately knew he was ideal. Lancaster Jones described him as "a very charming person" who has the ability to "bring the scary into the character". He also praised Pine for his singing voice. Lee said that Pine was the perfect choice for expressing the character's charm, intelligence and charisma.

Having previously appeared in earlier films produced by Walt Disney Pictures, including The Princess Diaries 2: Royal Engagement (2004) and Into the Woods (2014), Pine had already demonstrated his singing and was given the opportunity to sing two songs in Wish, one of which is a duet with Ariana DeBose. Despite being a duet between the two characters, DeBose and Pine recorded their vocals for "At All Costs" separately. Pine admitted that the singing aspect of the role made him nervous as it was not part of his background. He cited his vocals in Into The Woods and working with Stephen Sondheim for being a nervous singer but said that he enjoyed the challenge. He was particularly nervous of performing the song opposite DeBose, who praised his vocals. Pine said that he found recording the songs to be "really hard" but it brought out his competitive side by wanting to take on a challenge.

Pine said that Magnifico was a fun character to voice because he begins as a charming king who is adored by the people but descends into madness and ends up squealing at the end of the film. During the recording process he tried different ways of expressing the villainous aspects of the character and had to push himself physically to bring out those characteristics. He said that rather than taking inspiration from earlier Disney villains he liked the layered characterisation of Magnifico and thought the film's message should be "never trust vacant charm". In terms of Magnifico's characterisation, Pine felt that Magnifico wanted power throughout the entire film. He framed him as an "absolute narcissist" and opined that Magnifico believes himself to be the hero and he likes Amaya because she tells him how “handsome and cool” he is. He said that rather than trying to create a villain to the standard of Scar or Maleficent, he portrayed the villain in his own way.

== Appearances ==
=== Wish ===
A sorcerer named King Magnifico, alongside his wife Queen Amaya, rules over Rosas, a kingdom in the Mediterranean Sea that they founded many years before. Upon reaching their 18th birthday, the residents of Rosas give their greatest wish to him for safe keeping, while losing all memory of their wish. Once a month, Magnifico holds a ceremony in which a resident has the opportunity to be granted their wish. A seventeen-year-old girl named Asha aspires to be Magnifico's apprentice and attends an interview, hoping that she can influence him into granting the wish of Sabino, her grandfather who is aged 100 years. At the meeting with Magnifico, she asks for the wish to be granted but he refuses, telling her the wish is too vague and dangerous. Realising that he will never grant most of the wishes, she questions his motives. In anger, he sits her on the stage at the wish ceremony and tricks her into believing that Sabino's wish will be granted. After granting the wish to another resident, he rejects her application as apprentice and declares never to grant her grandfather's or mother's wishes. Looking up at the night sky, Asha hopes for a better future by wishing on a star, which descends from the sky. Through its magic, the star gives voices to the forest animals, including Valentino, Asha's pet goat and Asha names the magical being Star. Sensing the presence of the star, Magnifico feels threatened and is tempted to use forbidden dark magic to strengthen his power. While Magnifico is distracted, Asha breaks into his study and retrieves her grandfather's wish, but Magnifico arrives at her home and crushes her mother's wish, which makes him feel more powerful. After Asha and her family escape by boat to a nearby island, Magnifico publicly declares Asha to be a traitor and uses the book of forbidden magic to create a staff imbued with the power of three other wishes making him even more powerful, but this leads Amaya to discover her husband's true colors. Asha enlists the help of her friends and distracts Magnifico while they infiltrate his tower with the intention of freeing the wishes. They open up the roof but Magnifico contains all of the wishes and Star with his magic, eventually trapping Star in his staff and becoming increasingly more powerful. Using his magic, he restrains all of the people of Rosas, but Asha motivates the residents of Rosas to collectively wish for an end to Magnifico's reign. The residents stand up against Magnifico, which overpowers his magic and traps him inside the mirror on his staff, leaving Amaya to be the ruler of Rosas as Magnifico is taken to the dungeon.

== Reception ==
King Magnifico received a mixed reception from critics. Witney Seibold of SlashFilm described Magnifico as "Disney's first true villain in years", noting that the studio had moved from depicting outwardly evil villains to sympathetic or circumstantial villains, which she considered less powerful. She argued that he has no redeeming features, being selfish, greedy and vain and "kind of a sociopath". Seibold also considered the character to be a representation of corrupt leaders, due to him seemingly starting out with good intentions but eventually being corrupted by power. Brian Truitt writing for USA Today compared Magnifico to the Magic Mirror in Snow White and the Seven Dwarfs and felt that his vanity and habit of admiring his own reflection was a callback to the film. Kate Stables of GamesRadar+ appreciated Magnifico for being "a proper villain" and likened him to Maleficent for "whipping fluo-green 'Forbidden Magic' around his subjects in a storm of power-crazed narcissism". Katie Walsh of the Los Angeles Times compared him to Jafar from Aladdin (1992), describing him as "the ultimate example of the alluring, preening villain". Ray Greene writing for The A.V. Club drew comparisons between Magnifico and The Walt Disney Company by saying that its growth strategy was similar to Magnifico's for absorbing the dreams of others. Kristen Lopez of The Wrap described Magnifico as an "amazing" villain and enjoyed his villain song, highlighting the passionate vocals of Pine. David Crow of Den of Geek described Magnifico as the first Disney villain to be given a character arc and praised the "reliably charismatic cadence" of Pine.

Kalhan Rosenblatt of NBC News commented that Magnifico seemed like a classic Disney villain, being extremely vain and displaying his power in "a ghoulish shade of green", but highlighted that when his song "This Is the Thanks I Get?!" was released ahead of the film's debut, it received some criticism from fans who felt that there was something missing from the character. The Mary Sue's Rachel Leishman defended Pine's rendition of the song after it received a backlash on social media, describing it as a "fairly harmless villain song". Lovia Gyarkye writing for The Hollywood Reporter found Pine's performance to be entertaining but considered that the character's motivations were not clearly defined, resulting in an abrupt and unconvincing transition to villainy. Petrana Radulovic writing for Polygon thought that Magnifico had all the traits of a classic Disney villain, having a big ego and a villain song but felt that each one had already been done before by a previous Disney villain, while Magnifico had no defining traits of his own. She opined that his characterisation was not developed to make him a plausible character and that he should have been more nuanced rather than relying on corruption from forbidden dark magic as the reason for his villainy. Radulovic also felt that Magnifico was the culmination of the studio begrudgingly trying to satisfy the audience with a traditional villain.

Aleena Malik of Screen Rant thought that Magnifico was a one-dimensional villain and felt that his characterisation could have been given more depth with a more detailed backstory to help explain his motives. Laura Rutkowski writing for the Radio Times echoed this by saying that the film's biggest problem is that the audience cannot know if Magnifico is redeemable because the film does not explore enough of his backstory. Donald Clarke of The Irish Times felt that Magnifico is more of an "unsympathetic technocrat than a proper Disney villain" and did not understand the film's message. IGN's Carlos Aguilar enjoyed his characterisation as an "irredeemable bad guy" but found "This is the Thanks I Get?!" underwhelming and generic. He felt that Magnifico was just a mashup of earlier villains like Hans and Dr. Facilier. Jenny Nulf of The Austin Chronicle opined that Wish has a "villain problem", stating that Magnifico is a "dull" villain and seems to have no motive for his transition to evil. She commented that "Disney is afraid of making a villain that’s truly terrifying and despicable now". Justin Clarke of Slant thought that the film's overarching message about how men in power dehumanise and control the wishes of the lower classes was undermined by the film's "talking animals" and "butt jokes".

Pine received some positive comments for voicing the character. In a Variety review of the film, Owen Gleiberman described Pine's vocals as "punchy" and said that the performance makes the audience root against him. Ross Bonaime of Collider considered Pine's voice work to be one of the film's strengths and said that his villain song would be dull without the charm in Pine's performance. Kate Erbland of IndieWire was impressed by Pine's singing, describing anything he sang as "memorable" and also said that he obviously enjoys conveying the character's insanity. Phil de Semlyen writing for Time Out praised the fun in Pine's Magnifico and said that he is "like Saruman with a better grooming regimen".
