= Disney logo =

Corporate logo of the Walt Disney Company

Walt Disney wordmark

Walt Disney's signature

The Disney logo is the corporate logo of the Walt Disney Company since 1956. It is based on a stylized autograph of Walt Disney. Aside from being used by the Walt Disney Company, various Disney divisions and products use the same style/font in their logos, although with some differences depending on the company. The D in the Disney logo makes use of the golden ratio three times.

== Variations ==
Until 1985, instead of a traditional production logo, the opening credits of Disney films used to feature a title card that read "Walt Disney Presents", and later, "Walt Disney Productions Presents". In Never Cry Wolf, it showed a light blue rectangle with the name "Walt Disney Pictures" and featured a white outline rectangle framing on a black screen.

Beginning with the release of Return to Oz in 1985, Walt Disney Pictures introduced its fantasy castle logo. The version with its accompanying music premiered with The Black Cauldron. The logo was created by Walt Disney Productions in traditional animation and featured a white segmented silhouette of Disneyland's Sleeping Beauty Castle against a blue background, with the studio's name in Walt Disney text and underscored by "When You Wish Upon a Star", in arrangement composed by John Debney. A short rendition of the logo was used as a closing logo as well as in the movie Return to Oz, although the film was released months before The Black Cauldron was released. A computer-animated RenderMan variant appeared before every Pixar Animation Studios film from pre-2009 prints of Toy Story (1995) until Ratatouille (2007), featuring an original fanfare composed by Randy Newman, based on the opening score cue from Toy Story, called "Andy's Birthday". Beginning with Dinosaur (2000), an alternative logo featuring an orange castle and logo against a black background, was occasionally presented with darker tone and live-action films, though a few animated films such as Brother Bear, the 2003 re-release of The Lion King and The Wild (the final film to use this logo) used this logo. The original incarnation of this logo resurfaced in 2021 for a merchandising line by ShopDisney, based on the 1985 version.

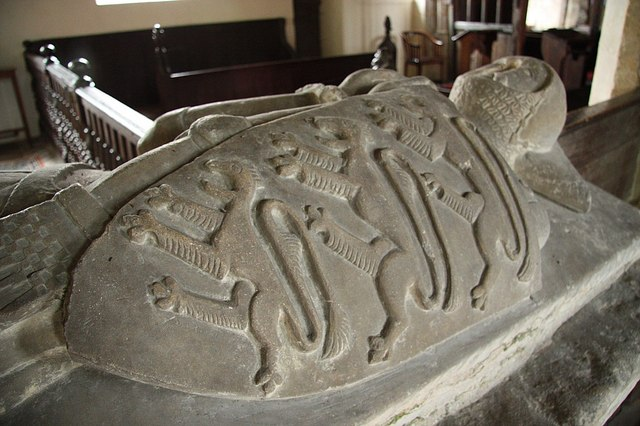
Effigy of Sir William D'Isney in the parish church of Norton Disney, Lincolnshire. The three lions family crest can be seen flying on the flag at the top of Cinderella's castle at the beginning of a Disney film.

In 2006, the studio's vanity card logo was updated with the release of Pirates of the Caribbean: Dead Man's Chest at the behest of then-Walt Disney Studios chairman Dick Cook and studio marketing president Oren Aviv. Designed by Disney animation director Mike Gabriel and producer Baker Bloodworth, the modernized logo was created completely in computer animation by Wētā FX and Yu+Co, and featured a 3D New Waltograph typography. The final rendering was done by Cameron Smith and Cyrese Parrish. In addition, the revamped logo includes visual references to Pinocchio, Dumbo, Cinderella, Peter Pan and Mary Poppins, and its redesigned castle incorporates elements from both the Cinderella Castle and the Sleeping Beauty Castle, as well as fireworks and Walt Disney's family crest. Mark Mancina wrote a new composition and arrangement of "When You Wish Upon a Star" to accompany the 2006 logo. It was co-arranged and orchestrated by David Metzger. In 2011, starting with The Muppets, the sequence was modified to truncate the "Walt Disney Pictures" branding to "Disney", which was used originally in home media releases since 2007 until 2023. The sequence had been consistently modified for high-profile releases including Tron: Legacy, Maleficent, Tomorrowland, The Jungle Book, Beauty and the Beast, The Lion King, Mulan, Hocus Pocus 2, and Disenchanted.

In 2022, a new production logo was introduced for the studio's 100th anniversary in 2023, which premiered at the 2022 D23 Expo. The sequence features an updated opening sequence in computer animation at sunrise created by Disney Studios Content and Industrial Light & Magic, and an arrangement of "When You Wish Upon a Star" composed by Christophe Beck, conducted by Tim Davies and mixed by Greg Hayes.The magical arc that usually flies from right to left above the castle now flies from left to right, a subtle reference to several arc appearances since 2005, including the 2005 Hong Kong Disneyland logo, the 2006 Walt Disney Pictures print logo, and most recently the animated Disney+ logo. A tagline appears below the Disney100 logo during the studio's 100th anniversary in 2023, reading "100 Years of Wonder", which was later removed starting with Chang Can Dunk but returned in select prints (including the world premiere and international prints) of Indiana Jones and the Dial of Destiny. While containing the same visual references as the previous logo, new references added to it include Pocahontas, Up, Hercules, The Hunchback of Notre Dame, Snow White and the Seven Dwarfs, The Little Mermaid, Tangled, Brave and Beauty and the Beast, with the addition of the Matterhorn from Third Man on the Mountain and its Disneyland attraction and Pride Rock from The Lion King in the background beyond the castle. Its first film appearance was Strange World (2022). The logo received widespread praise from critics and audiences and won Gold in the "Theatrical | Film: Design" medium at the 2023 Clio Entertainment Awards in November 2023. The standard version was unveiled on the "Disney" hub of the Disney+ app on December 23, 2023, and made its official debut in 2024 with the second trailer for Inside Out 2, with the full version premiering on the documentary film The Beach Boys.
