= David Metzger =

American composer, arranger, and orchestrator (born 1960)

- Born: December 12, 1960 (age 65); Corvallis, Oregon, U.S.
- Occupations: Film score composer, arranger, and orchestrator

David Metzger (born December 12, 1960) is an American composer, conductor, arranger, and orchestrator who has worked on many Disney Animation films, including Wish, Frozen, Frozen 2, Moana, Planes, Wreck-It Ralph, Tarzan, Brother Bear, and Mufasa: The Lion King. In addition to his work for Disney, he has done orchestrations for over 50 major films, composed the musical scores for Tarzan 2, Brother Bear 2, and Tarzan & Jane, and has numerous video game, theme park, television, and commercial credits, as well as co-arranging and orchestrating "When You Wish Upon a Star" for the 2006 Walt Disney Pictures logo with Mark Mancina, and co-composing the 2013 DisneyToon Studios logo with Mancina. He was nominated for a Grammy Award for his producing work on Frozen 2.

Metzger received a Tony and a Drama Desk nomination in 1998 for his orchestration of Broadway musical The Lion King. He won a DVDX award for best original score in a DVD premiere movie for Tarzan 2 in 2006.

He has orchestrated the Broadway musical Frozen and is also orchestrating the musical August Rush.

== Career ==
Metzger was the arranger for jazz trumpeter Maynard Ferguson in the late 1980s. From 1992 to 1997, he was the arranger for The Tonight Show with Jay Leno.

Metzger was a longtime collaborator with film composer Mark Mancina. Beginning in 2008 he has also worked with other notable Hollywood and Broadway composers including Robert Lopez, Kristen Anderson-Lopez, Benj Pasek, Justin Paul, Julia Michaels, Benjamin Rice, Alan Menken, John Powell, Alan Silvestri, Christophe Beck, and others.

== Personal life ==
Metzger grew up in Corvallis, Oregon. He received his Bachelor of Music degree from California State University, Long Beach. He also did graduate work at UCLA. He began composing for choir and jazz band in junior high school. In his young adult years, he wrote many jazz band charts that are still played today.

Metzger currently lives in Oregon with his wife. He has two grown sons.

== Discography ==
=== Film orchestrations ===
==== 1990s ====
Year	Title	Studio(s)	Composer	Notes
1994	The Lion King	Walt Disney Pictures	Hans Zimmer	
1997	Speed 2: Cruise Control	20th Century Fox	Mark Mancina	
1998	Armageddon	Touchstone	Trevor Rabin	
1998	Return to Paradise	Universal Pictures	Mark Mancina	
1999	Tarzan	Walt Disney Pictures; Walt Disney Animation Studios	Mark Mancina	

==== 2000s ====
Year	Title	Studio(s)	Composer(s)	Notes
2000	Bait	Warner Bros.	Mark Mancina	
2001	Training Day	Warner Bros.	Mark Mancina	Composer of Additional Music
2001	Domestic Disturbance	Paramount Pictures	Mark Mancina	Composer of Additional Music
2003	Atlantis: Milo's Return	Walt Disney Home Entertainment; Disneytoon Studios	Don L. Harper	
2003	Bad Boys II	Columbia Pictures	Trevor Rabin	
2003	Brother Bear	Walt Disney Pictures; Walt Disney Animation Studios	Mark Mancina	Vocal Arranger
2003	The Haunted Mansion	Walt Disney Pictures	Mark Mancina	Composer of Additional Music; Sound Consultant
2004	The Lion King 1½	Walt Disney Home Entertainment; Disneytoon Studios	Don L. Harper	
2005	Asylum	Paramount Classics	Mark Mancina	Additional Music Arranger
2006	Glory Road	Walt Disney Pictures	Trevor Rabin	Additional Orchestrations
2006	Scary Movie 4	Dimension Films	James L. Venable	
2006	Flyboys	MGM	Trevor Rabin	
2007	August Rush	Warner Bros.	Mark Mancina	
2007	Shooter	Paramount Pictures	Mark Mancina	Synthesizer Programmer
2007	Live Free or Die Hard	20th Century Fox	Marco Beltrami	Arranger of "America the Beautiful"
2007	The Simpsons Movie	20th Century Fox	Hans Zimmer	
2008	Camille	Ruddy Morgan Productions	Mark Mancina	Composer of Additional Music
2008	Horton Hears a Who!	20th Century Fox	John Powell	
2008	Kung Fu Panda	DreamWorks Animation	John Powell; Hans Zimmer	
2008	Hancock	Columbia Pictures	John Powell	
2008	Bolt	Walt Disney Pictures; Walt Disney Animation Studios	John Powell	
2009	Imagine That	Paramount Pictures; Nickelodeon Movies	Mark Mancina	Composer of Additional Music
2009	Night at the Museum: Battle of the Smithsonian	20th Century Fox	Alan Silvestri	
2009	Ice Age: Dawn of the Dinosaurs	20th Century Fox	John Powell	
2009	G.I. Joe: The Rise of Cobra	Paramount Pictures	Alan Silvestri	
2009	Hurricane Season	The Weinstein Company; Dimension Films	Mark Mancina	Composer of Additional Music

==== 2010s ====
Year	Title	Studio(s)	Composer(s)	Notes
2010	Diary of a Wimpy Kid	20th Century Fox	Theodore Shapiro	
2010	Knight and Day	20th Century Fox	John Powell	
2010	How to Train Your Dragon	DreamWorks Animation	John Powell	
2011	Mars Needs Moms	Walt Disney Pictures	John Powell	
2011	Winnie The Pooh	Walt Disney Pictures; Walt Disney Animation Studios	Henry Jackman	
2011	Rio	20th Century Fox	John Powell	
2011	Kung Fu Panda 2	DreamWorks Animation	Hans Zimmer; John Powell	
2011	X-Men: First Class	20th Century Fox	Henry Jackman	
2011	Captain America: The First Avenger	Paramount Pictures	Alan Silvestri	
2011	Happy Feet Two	Warner Bros.	John Powell	
2012	The Raven	Intrepid Pictures	Lucas Vidal	
2012	The Pirates: Band of Misfits	Sony Pictures Animation	Theodore Shapiro	
2012	Emperor	Krasnoff Foster Productions	Alex Heffes	
2012	The Lorax	Universal Pictures	John Powell	
2012	Ice Age: Continental Drift	20th Century Fox	John Powell	
2012	Wreck-It Ralph	Walt Disney Pictures; Walt Disney Animation Studios	Henry Jackman	
2012	The Twilight Saga: Breaking Dawn – Part 2	Lionsgate	Carter Burwell	
2012	The Avengers	Marvel Studios	Alan Silvestri	
2013	The Lost Medallion: The Adventures of Billy Stone	Freestyle Releasing	Marc Fantini; Steffan Fantini	
2013	Legends of Oz: Dorothy's Return	Clarius Entertainment; Prana Studios	Toby Chu	
2013	Escape Plan	Emmett/Furla Films	Alex Heffes	
2013	Planes	Walt Disney Pictures; Disneytoon Studios	Mark Mancina	Composer of Additional Music
2013	Frozen	Walt Disney Pictures; Walt Disney Animation Studios	Christophe Beck; Robert Lopez; Kristen Anderson-Lopez	Additional Work as Song Arranger
2014	Planes: Fire and Rescue	Walt Disney Pictures; Disneytoon Studios	Mark Mancina	Composer of Additional Music
2014	Muppets Most Wanted	Walt Disney Pictures; Walt Disney Animation Studios	Christophe Beck	
2014	Rio 2	20th Century Fox	John Powell	
2014	How to Train Your Dragon 2	DreamWorks Animation	John Powell	
2015	Strange Magic	Touchstone Pictures; Lucasfilm	Marius de Vries	Choir Contractor
2015	Frozen Fever	Walt Disney Pictures; Walt Disney Animation Studios	Christophe Beck	Additional Work as Song Arranger and Conductor
2015	Ant-Man	Marvel Studios	Christophe Beck	
2016	Ice Age: Collision Course	20th Century Fox	John Debney	
2016	Moana	Walt Disney Pictures; Walt Disney Animation Studios	Mark Mancina; Lin-Manuel Miranda; Opetaia Foa'i	Additional work as Song, Score, and Vocal Arranger, Additional Music Composer
2017	Captain Underpants: The First Epic Movie	DreamWorks Animation	Theodore Shapiro	
2017	Olaf's Frozen Adventure	Walt Disney Pictures; Walt Disney Animation Studios	Christophe Beck	Additional work as Music Song Producer and Song and Score Arranger
2017	The Star	Sony Pictures Animation	John Paesano	
2018	Ralph Breaks the Internet	Walt Disney Pictures; Walt Disney Animation Studios	Henry Jackman	Song Arranger and Orchestrator of "A Place Called Slaughter Race"
2019	The Lion King	Walt Disney Pictures; Fairview Entertainment	Hans Zimmer	
2019	Frozen 2	Walt Disney Pictures; Walt Disney Animation Studios	Christophe Beck; Robert Lopez; Kristen Anderson-Lopez	Song Arranger and Orchestrator of all songs; Score Orchestrator; Co-Producer of all songs

==== 2020s ====
Year	Title	Studio(s)	Composer(s)	Notes
2022	Lyle, Lyle, Crocodile	Columbia Pictures; Sony Pictures Releasing	Matthew Margeson; Benj Pasek and Justin Paul	Song Arranger, Producer, and Orchestrator of "Take A Look At Us Now"
2022	Spirited	Apple TV+ Apple Studios	Dominic Lewis; Benj Pasek and Justin Paul	Song Arranger, Producer, and Orchestrator of all songs
2022	Disenchanted	Walt Disney Pictures	Alan Menken	Song Arranger and Orchestrator of all songs
2024	Spellbound	Skydance Animation; Netflix	Alan Menken	Song Orchestrator
2025	Snow White	Walt Disney Pictures	Benj Pasek and Justin Paul	Song Arranger, Producer and Orchestrator of new songs
2025	How to Train Your Dragon	Universal Pictures; DreamWorks Animation	John Powell	Legacy Orchestrator

=== Broadway orchestrations ===
Year	Title	Notes
1997	The Lion King	Nominated for Tony Award for Best Orchestrations; Drama Desk Nomination for Outstanding Orchestrations
2016	Up Here	La Jolla Playhouse
2018	Frozen	
	August Rush	Upcoming

=== Film and TV composer ===
Years	Title	Notes
1992–1997	The Tonight Show with Jay Leno	TV, NBC; 23 episodes
1998–2000	The Magnificent Seven	TV, CBS; 12 episodes
2001–2003	The Legend of Tarzan	TV, Disney; 9 episodes
2002	Tarzan & Jane	Disney; DVDX Nomination for Best Original Score in a DVD Premiere Movie; Co-composed with Patrick Griffin and Don L. Harper
2005	Blood+	Aniplex, Production I.G. Co-composed with Mark Mancina
2005	Tarzan II	Disney; DVDX Winner for Best Original Score in a DVD Premiere Movie; Co-composed with Mark Mancina
2006	Brother Bear 2	Disney
2023	Once Upon a Studio	Disney
2023	Wish	Disney
2024	Mufasa: The Lion King	Disney

=== Video games ===
- You Don't Know Jack (1999).
- Sorcery (2012). Arranger, additional music. Sony Computer Entertainment
- Call of Duty: Modern Warfare 2 (2009). Additional music, 3 levels. Activision

=== Miscellaneous ===
Disney Castle Logo. Orchestrator and Arranger. Disney, 2006.
