= Fawn Veerasunthorn =

Thai film director and animator

- Born: Prasansook Veerasunthorn; Chonburi Province, Thailand
- Occupations: Film director; animator; storyboard artist
- Years active: 2006–present
- Employers: Illumination Entertainment (2007–2011); Walt Disney Animation Studios (2011–present)
- Children: 1

Prasansook "Fawn" Veerasunthorn (Thai: ประสานสุข วีระสุนทร (ฝน)) is a Thai film director and animator. She worked on the Disney Animation films Frozen (2013), Moana (2016), and Zootopia (2016) as a storyboard artist, and as head of story on Raya and the Last Dragon (2021). The first feature film she directed was Disney's Wish (2023), in collaboration with Chris Buck.

== Early life and education ==
Veerasunthorn was born in Chonburi Province, Thailand. As a child, she was inspired by the film Dumbo, especially by a scene designed by Mary Blair. She later attended Triam Udom Suksa School in Bangkok. While studying medicine at Mahidol University, she assembled a portfolio to send to Paitoon Ratanasiritrawoot, another Triam Udom Suksa graduate and animator then working at Walt Disney Feature Animation Florida, who advised her to drop out of Mahidol and move to the United States to study fine arts at the Columbus College of Art and Design on a student visa.

== Career ==
After graduating in 2004, Veerasunthorn worked at studios such as 6 Point Harness, Warner Bros. Animation, Nickelodeon Animation Studios and Illumination, the latter as a story artist on the films The Lorax (2012) and Despicable Me 2 (2013). In 2011, Veerasunthorn joined the story department at Walt Disney Animation Studios, starting with the film Frozen (2013), which would go on to win the Academy Award for Best Animated Feature in 2013. She subsequently worked as a story artist on other Disney films, including Moana (2016), Zootopia (2016), and Ralph Breaks the Internet (2018). Veerasunthorn was later promoted to head of Disney's animation department and served as head of story on Raya and the Last Dragon in 2021.

On September 9, 2022, during the 2022 D23 Expo Presentation, Disney Animation announced their next film as Wish (2023), with Chris Buck and Veerasunthorn attached as directors. Veerasunthorn was recognized by the Government of Thailand as the first Thai artist to direct a Disney animated film.

At the CinemaCon 2026, it was announced that Veerasunthorn and Jason Hand were the directors for Hexed (2026), with Josie Trinidad as co-director. The film centers on Billie, an impulsive teenage girl, who discovers magical abilities that transport her from suburbia into a witch realm called Hexe. Forced to team up with her cautious mother, Alice, the two uncover family secrets that could reshape the world of witches.

At the 2026 D23 fan event, Disney Animation announced a new original film titled Clay (2028), with Veerasunthorn set to direct.

== Personal life ==
Veerasunthorn currently lives in Burbank, California with her husband, daughter and two cats.

== Filmography ==
=== Film ===
Year	Title	Notes
2010	Banana	Short film, story artist
2010	Home Makeover	Short film, story artist
2010	Orientation Day	Short film, story artist
2011	Hop	Storyboard artist
2012	The Lorax	Additional story artist
2012	Hydee and the Hytops	Direct-to-video film, storyboard artist
2013	Despicable Me 2	Story artist
2013	Frozen	Storyboard artist
2016	Zootopia	Story artist
2016	Moana	Story artist, visual development artist
2018	Ralph Breaks the Internet	Story artist
2021	Raya and the Last Dragon	Head of story
2023	Wish	Director, story writer
2024	Moana 2	Additional story artist
2025	Zootopia 2	Additional story artist
2026	Lilo & Scratch	Short film; director, writer, voice of Scratch
2026	Hexed	Director
2028	Clay	Director

=== Television ===
Year	Title	Notes
2007	El Tigre: The Adventures of Manny Rivera	Key animator, 6 episodes
2007–2008	Kappa Mikey	Animator, 25 episodes
2010	Los Tres Trabajadores: Boss man	Television film, animator
2010	Pink Panther and Pals	Storyboard artist, 16 episodes
2011–2012	The Looney Tunes Show	Storyboard artist
2012	Robot and Monster	Storyboard artist, 8 episodes
