= List of Walt Disney Animation Studios films =

Walt Disney Animation Studios is an American animation studio headquartered in Burbank, California, the original feature film division of the Walt Disney Company. The studio's films are also often called "Disney Classics" (or "Classic Animated Features" in the case of the films with traditional hand drawn animation), or "Disney Animated Canon".

Originally known as Walt Disney Productions (1937–1985), Walt Disney Animation (1986–1994) and Walt Disney Feature Animation (1994–2007), the studio has produced 64 films, beginning with Snow White and the Seven Dwarfs in 1937, one of the first full-length animated feature films, and the first produced in the United States. The studio's most recent release is Zootopia 2 in 2025, with their upcoming slate of films including Hexed in 2026, Frozen 3 in 2027, and Clay in 2028. In addition, an unannounced film is scheduled to be released in 2029.

== Released films ==
Film	Release date	Director(s)	Writer(s)	Based on / Inspired by	Producer(s)	Composer(s)
as Walt Disney Productions
Snow White and the Seven Dwarfs	December 21, 1937	Supervising Director: David Hand; Sequence Directors: Perce Pearce, William Cottrell, Larry Morey, Wilfred Jackson & Ben Sharpsteen	Ted Sears, Richard Creedon, Otto Englander, Dick Rickard, Earl Hurd, Merrill De Maris, Dorothy Ann Blank & Webb Smith	"Snow White" by Brothers Grimm	Walt Disney	Frank Churchill, Leigh Harline & Paul Smith
Pinocchio	February 7, 1940	Supervising Directors: Ben Sharpsteen & Hamilton Luske; Sequence Directors: Bill Roberts, Norman Ferguson, Jack Kinney, Wilfred Jackson & T. Hee	Ted Sears, Otto Englander, Webb Smith, Billy Cottrell, Joseph Sabo, Erdman Penner & Aurelius Battaglia	The Adventures of Pinocchio by Carlo Collodi	Walt Disney	Leigh Harline & Paul Smith
Fantasia	November 13, 1940	See credits	Joe Grant & Dick Huemer	"The Sorcerer's Apprentice" by Johann Wolfgang von Goethe inter alia	Walt Disney & Ben Sharpsteen	Various classical composers
Dumbo	October 23, 1941	Supervising Director: Ben Sharpsteen; Sequence Directors: Norman Ferguson, Wilfred Jackson, Bill Roberts, Jack Kinney & Samuel Armstrong	Joe Grant & Dick Huemer	Dumbo, the Flying Elephant by Helen Aberson and Harold Pearl	Walt Disney	Frank Churchill and Oliver Wallace
Bambi	August 13, 1942	Supervising Director: David Hand; Sequence Directors: James Algar, Bill Roberts, Norman Wright, Samuel Armstrong, Paul Satterfield & Graham Heid	Perce Pearce, Larry Morey, Vernon Stallings, Mel Shaw, Carl Fallberg, Chuck Couch & Ralph Wright	Bambi, a Life in the Woods by Felix Salten	Walt Disney	Frank Churchill and Edward H. Plumb
Saludos Amigos	February 6, 1943	Norm Ferguson; Wilfred Jackson; Jack Kinney; Hamilton Luske; Bill Roberts	Homer Brightman, William Cottrell, Dick Huemer, Joe Grant, Harold Reeves, Ted Sears, Webb Smith, Roy Williams & Ralph Wright	—N/a	Walt Disney	Paul Smith and Edward H. Plumb
The Three Caballeros	February 3, 1945	Supervising Director: Norm Ferguson Sequence Directors: Clyde Geronimi; Jack Kinney; Bill Roberts; Harold Young	Homer Brightman, Ernest Terrazas, Ted Sears, Bill Peet, Ralph Wright, Elmer Plummer, James Bodrero, Billy Cottrell, Del Connell & Roy Williams	—N/a	Walt Disney	Edward H. Plumb, Paul Smith and Charles Wolcott
Make Mine Music	April 20, 1946	Jack Kinney; Clyde Geronimi; Hamilton Luske; Joshua Meador; Robert Cormack	James Bodrero, Homer Brightman, Erwin Graham, Eric Gurney, T. Hee, Sylvia Holland, Dick Huemer, Dick Kelsey, Dick Kinney, Jesse Marsh, Tom Oreb, Cap Palmer, Erdman Penner, Dick Shaw, Harry Reeves, John Walbridge & Roy Williams	"Casey at the Bat" by Ernest Thayer & Peter and the Wolf by Sergei Prokofiev inter alia	Walt Disney	Eliot Daniel, Ken Darby, Charles Wolcott, Oliver Wallace and Edward H. Plumb
Fun and Fancy Free	September 27, 1947	Jack Kinney; Bill Roberts; Hamilton Luske; William Morgan	Homer Brightman, Eldon Dedini, Lance Nolley, Tom Oreb, Harry Reeves & Ted Sears	"Little Bear Bongo" by Sinclair Lewis & "Jack and the Beanstalk" by Benjamin Tabart	Walt Disney	Oliver Wallace, Paul Smith, Eliot Daniel and Charles Wolcott
Melody Time	May 27, 1948	Clyde Geronimi; Wilfred Jackson; Hamilton Luske; Jack Kinney	Winston Hibler, Erdman Penner, Harry Reeves, Homer Brightman, Ken Anderson, Ted Sears, Joe Rinaldi, Billy Cottrell, Art Scott, Jesse Marsh, Bob Moore & John Walbridge	The life of Johnny Appleseed, Little Toot by Hardie Gramatky, "Trees" by Joyce Kilmer & Pecos Bill	Walt Disney	Eliot Daniel, Paul Smith and Ken Darby
The Adventures of Ichabod and Mr. Toad	October 5, 1949	Ben Sharpsteen; James Algar; Clyde Geronimi; Jack Kinney	Erdman Penner, Winston Hibler, Joe Rinaldi, Ted Sears, Homer Brightman & Harry Reeves	The Wind in the Willows by Kenneth Grahame "The Legend of Sleepy Hollow" by Washington Irving	Walt Disney	Oliver Wallace
Cinderella	February 15, 1950	Clyde Geronimi; Wilfred Jackson; Hamilton Luske	Bill Peet, Ted Sears, Homer Brightman, Ken Anderson, Erdman Penner, Winston Hibler, Harry Reeves & Joe Rinaldi	"Cinderella" by Charles Perrault	Walt Disney	Oliver Wallace
Alice in Wonderland	July 28, 1951	Clyde Geronimi; Wilfred Jackson; Hamilton Luske	Winston Hibler, Ted Sears, Bill Peet, Erdman Penner, Joe Rinaldi, Milt Banta, Billy Cottrell, Dick Kelsey, Joe Grant, Dick Huemer, Del Connell, Tom Oreb & John Walbridge	Alice's Adventures in Wonderland & Through the Looking-Glass by Lewis Carroll	Walt Disney	Oliver Wallace
Peter Pan	February 5, 1953	Clyde Geronimi; Wilfred Jackson; Hamilton Luske	Ted Sears, Erdman Penner, Bill Peet, Winston Hibler, Joe Rinaldi, Milt Banta, Ralph Wright & Billy Cottrell	Peter Pan by J. M. Barrie	Walt Disney	Oliver Wallace
Lady and the Tramp	June 22, 1955	Clyde Geronimi; Wilfred Jackson; Hamilton Luske	Erdman Penner; Joe Rinaldi; Ralph Wright; Don DaGradi	Happy Dan, the Cynical Dog & Lady and the Tramp: The Story of Two Dogs by Ward Greene	Walt Disney	Oliver Wallace
Sleeping Beauty	January 29, 1959	Supervising Director: Clyde Geronimi Sequence Directors: Eric Larson; Wolfgang Reitherman; Les Clark	Erdman Penner, Joe Rinaldi, Winston Hibler, Bill Peet, Ted Sears, Ralph Wright & Milt Banta	"Sleeping Beauty" by Charles Perrault, "Little Briar Rose" by Brothers Grimm & The Sleeping Beauty by Pyotr Ilyich Tchaikovsky	Walt Disney	George Bruns
One Hundred and One Dalmatians	January 25, 1961	Wolfgang Reitherman; Hamilton Luske; Clyde Geronimi	Bill Peet	The Hundred and One Dalmatians by Dodie Smith	Walt Disney	George Bruns
The Sword in the Stone	December 25, 1963	Wolfgang Reitherman	Bill Peet	The Sword in the Stone by T. H. White	Walt Disney	George Bruns
The Jungle Book	October 18, 1967	Wolfgang Reitherman	Larry Clemmons, Ralph Wright, Ken Anderson & Vance Gerry	the Mowgli stories from The Jungle Book by Rudyard Kipling	Walt Disney	George Bruns
The Aristocats	December 24, 1970	Wolfgang Reitherman	Larry Clemmons, Vance Gerry, Frank Thomas, Julius Svendsen, Ken Anderson, Eric Cleworth & Ralph Wright	—N/a	Winston Hibler & Wolfgang Reitherman	George Bruns
Robin Hood	November 8, 1973	Wolfgang Reitherman	Larry Clemmons, Ken Anderson, Vance Gerry, Frank Thomas, Eric Cleworth, Julius Svendsen & Dave Michener	The legend of Robin Hood	Wolfgang Reitherman	George Bruns
The Many Adventures of Winnie the Pooh	March 11, 1977	Wolfgang Reitherman; John Lounsbery	Larry Clemmons, Vance Gerry, Ken Anderson, Ted Berman, Ralph Wright, X Atencio, Julius Svendsen, Eric Cleworth & Winston Hibler	Winnie-the-Pooh book series by A. A. Milne	Walt Disney & Wolfgang Reitherman (Note: Before his death in 1966, Walt Disney acted as the producer of the featurettes Winnie the Pooh and the Honey Tree and Winnie the Pooh and the Blustery Day, both of which were featured in the film.)	Buddy Baker
The Rescuers	June 22, 1977	Wolfgang Reitherman; John Lounsbery; Art Stevens	Larry Clemmons, Ken Anderson, Vance Gerry, Ted Berman, Burny Mattinson, Frank Thomas, David Michener, Fred Lucky & Dick Sebast	The Rescuers book series by Margery Sharp	Wolfgang Reitherman and Ron W. Miller	Artie Butler
The Fox and the Hound	July 10, 1981	Art Stevens; Ted Berman; Richard Rich	Larry Clemmons, Ted Berman, David Michener, Peter Young, Burny Mattinson, Steve Hulett, Earl Kress & Vance Gerry	The Fox and the Hound by Daniel P. Mannix	Ron W. Miller, Wolfgang Reitherman & Art Stevens	Buddy Baker
The Black Cauldron (Note: Co-produced with Silver Screen Partners II)	July 24, 1985	Ted Berman; Richard Rich	David Jonas, Al Wilson, Vance Gerry, Roy Morita, Berman, Peter Young, Richard Rich, Art Stevens & Joe Hale	The Chronicles of Prydain book series by Lloyd Alexander	Joe Hale & Ron W. Miller	Elmer Bernstein
as Walt Disney Feature Animation
The Great Mouse Detective	July 2, 1986	John Musker; Ron Clements; David Michener; Burny Mattinson	Peter Young, Vance Gerry, Steve Hulett, Ron Clements, John Musker, Bruce M. Morris, Matthew O'Callaghan, Burny Mattinson, David Michener & Melvin Shaw	Basil of Baker Street book series by Eve Titus	Burny Mattinson	Henry Mancini
Oliver & Company (Note: Co-produced with Silver Screen Partners III)	November 18, 1988	George Scribner	Jim Cox, Timothy J. Disney & James Mangold	loosely inspired by Oliver Twist by Charles Dickens & Les Misérables by Victor Hugo	Kathleen Gavin (uncredited)	J. A. C. Redford
The Little Mermaid (Note: Co-produced with Silver Screen Partners IV)	November 17, 1989	John Musker; Ron Clements	John Musker; Ron Clements	"The Little Mermaid" by Hans Christian Andersen	Howard Ashman & John Musker	Alan Menken
The Rescuers Down Under	November 16, 1990	Hendel Butoy; Mike Gabriel	Jim Cox, Karey Kirkpatrick, Byron Sampson & Joe Ranft	The Rescuers book series by Margery Sharp	Thomas Schumacher	Bruce Broughton
Beauty and the Beast	November 22, 1991	Gary Trousdale; Kirk Wise	Linda Woolverton	"Beauty and the Beast" by Jeanne-Marie Leprince de Beaumont	Don Hahn	Alan Menken
Aladdin	November 25, 1992	John Musker; Ron Clements	Ron Clements, John Musker, Ted Elliott & Terry Rossio	"Aladdin and the Magic Lamp" from One Thousand and One Nights	John Musker & Ron Clements	Alan Menken
The Lion King	June 24, 1994	Roger Allers; Rob Minkoff	Irene Mecchi, Jonathan Roberts & Linda Woolverton	loosely inspired by Hamlet by William Shakespeare	Don Hahn	Hans Zimmer
Pocahontas	June 23, 1995	Mike Gabriel; Eric Goldberg	Carl Binder, Susannah Grant & Philip LaZebnik	an idea by Mike Gabriel	James Pentecost	Alan Menken
The Hunchback of Notre Dame	June 21, 1996	Gary Trousdale; Kirk Wise	Screenplay: Tab Murphy, Irene Mecchi, Bob Tzudiker, Noni White & Jonathan Roberts; Story: Tab Murphy	Notre Dame de Paris by Victor Hugo	Don Hahn	Alan Menken
Hercules	June 27, 1997	John Musker; Ron Clements	Ron Clements, John Musker, Donald McEnery, Bob Shaw & Irene Mecchi	The Greek myth of Heracles	Alice Dewey, John Musker & Ron Clements	Alan Menken
Mulan	June 19, 1998	Barry Cook; Tony Bancroft	Screenplay: Rita Hsiao, Chris Sanders, Philip LaZebnik, Raymond Singer & Eugenia Bostwick-Singer; Story: Robert D. San Souci	Ballad of Mulan by Guo Maoqian	Pam Coats	Jerry Goldsmith
Tarzan	June 18, 1999	Kevin Lima; Chris Buck	Tab Murphy, Bob Tzudiker & Noni White	Tarzan of the Apes by Edgar Rice Burroughs	Bonnie Arnold	Mark Mancina
Fantasia 2000	December 17, 1999	James Algar; Paul and Gaëtan Brizzi; Hendel Butoy; Francis Glebas; Eric Goldberg; Don Hahn; Pixote Hunt	See Credits	"The Steadfast Tin Soldier" by Hans Christian Andersen & Noah's Ark inter alia	Roy E. Disney & Donald W. Ernst	James Levine
Dinosaur	May 19, 2000	Ralph Zondag; Eric Leighton	Screenplay: John Harrison, Robert Nelson Jacobs & Walon Green; Story: Walon Green, John Harrison, Robert Nelson Jacobs, Thom Enriquez & Ralph Zondag	—N/a	Pam Marsden	James Newton Howard
The Emperor's New Groove	December 15, 2000	Mark Dindal	Screenplay: David Reynolds; Story: Chris Williams & Mark Dindal	—N/a	Randy Fullmer	John Debney
Atlantis: The Lost Empire	June 15, 2001	Gary Trousdale; Kirk Wise	Screenplay: Tab Murphy; Story: Kirk Wise, Gary Trousdale, Joss Whedon, Bryce Zabel, Jackie Zabel & Tab Murphy	loosely inspired by the legend of Atlantis	Don Hahn	James Newton Howard
Lilo & Stitch	June 21, 2002	Chris Sanders; Dean DeBlois	Chris Sanders; Dean DeBlois	loosely inspired by a unpublished picture book by Chris Sanders	Clark Spencer	Alan Silvestri
Treasure Planet	November 27, 2002	John Musker; Ron Clements	Screenplay: Ron Clements, John Musker & Rob Edwards; Story: Ron Clements, John Musker, Ted Elliott & Terry Rossio	Treasure Island by Robert Louis Stevenson	Roy Conli, John Musker & Ron Clements	James Newton Howard
Brother Bear	November 1, 2003	Aaron Blaise; Robert Walker	Tab Murphy, Lorne Cameron, David Hoselton, Steve Bencich & Ron J. Friedman	—N/a	Chuck Williams	Mark Mancina
Home on the Range	April 2, 2004	Will Finn; John Sanford	Screenplay: Will Finn & John Sanford; Story: Will Finn, John Sanford, Michael LaBash, Sam Levine, Mark Kennedy & Robert Lence	—N/a	Alice Dewey Goldstone	Alan Menken
Chicken Little	November 4, 2005	Mark Dindal	Screenplay: Steve Bencich, Ron J. Friedman & Ron Anderson; Story: Mark Dindal & Mark Kennedy	an original idea by Mark Dindal	Randy Fullmer	John Debney
as Walt Disney Animation Studios
Meet the Robinsons	March 30, 2007	Stephen Anderson	Jon A. Bernstein, Michelle Spritz, Don Hall, Nathan Greno, Aurian Redson, Joe Mateo & Stephen Anderson	A Day with Wilbur Robinson by William Joyce	Dorothy McKim	Danny Elfman
Bolt	November 21, 2008	Chris Williams; Byron Howard	Dan Fogelman & Chris Williams	based on an original idea by Chris Sanders	Clark Spencer	John Powell
The Princess and the Frog	December 11, 2009	John Musker; Ron Clements	Screenplay: Ron Clements, John Musker & Rob Edwards; Story: Ron Clements, John Musker, Greg Erb & Jason Oremland	The Frog Princess by E. D. Baker & "The Frog Prince" by Brothers Grimm	Peter Del Vecho	Randy Newman
Tangled	November 24, 2010	Nathan Greno; Byron Howard	Dan Fogelman	"Rapunzel" by Brothers Grimm	Roy Conli	Alan Menken
Winnie the Pooh	July 15, 2011	Stephen Anderson; Don Hall	Stephen Anderson, Clio Chiang, Don Dougherty, Don Hall, Kendelle Hoyer, Brian Kesinger, Nicole Mitchell & Jeremy Spears	Winnie-the-Pooh book series by A. A. Milne	Peter Del Vecho & Clark Spencer	Henry Jackman
Wreck-It Ralph	November 2, 2012	Rich Moore	Screenplay: Phil Johnston & Jennifer Lee; Story: Rich Moore, Phil Johnston & Jim Reardon	—N/a	Clark Spencer	Henry Jackman
Frozen	November 27, 2013	Chris Buck; Jennifer Lee	Screenplay: Jennifer Lee; Story: Chris Buck, Jennifer Lee & Shane Morris	loosely inspired by "The Snow Queen" by Hans Christian Andersen	Peter Del Vecho	Christophe Beck
Big Hero 6	November 7, 2014	Don Hall; Chris Williams	Jordan Roberts, Robert L. Baird & Dan Gerson	Big Hero 6 by Man of Action	Roy Conli	Henry Jackman
Zootopia	March 4, 2016	Byron Howard; Rich Moore Co-director: Jared Bush	Screenplay: Jared Bush & Phil Johnston; Story: Byron Howard, Rich Moore, Jared Bush, Jim Reardon, Josie Trinidad, Phil Johnston & Jennifer Lee	—N/a	Clark Spencer	Michael Giacchino
Moana	November 23, 2016	John Musker; Ron Clements Co-directors: Chris Williams; Don Hall	Screenplay: Jared Bush; Story: Ron Clements, John Musker, Chris Williams, Don Hall, Pamela Ribon, Aaron & Jordan Kandell	inspired by the Hawaiian myth of Māui	Osnat Shurer	Mark Mancina
Ralph Breaks the Internet	November 21, 2018	Rich Moore; Phil Johnston	Screenplay: Phil Johnston & Pamela Ribon; Story: Rich Moore, Phil Johnston, Jim Reardon, Pamela Ribon & Josie Trinidad	The film by Phil Johnston & Jennifer Lee	Clark Spencer	Henry Jackman
Frozen 2	November 22, 2019	Chris Buck; Jennifer Lee	Screenplay: Jennifer Lee; Story: Chris Buck, Jennifer Lee, Marc E. Smith, Kristen Anderson-Lopez & Robert Lopez	The film by Jennifer Lee	Peter Del Vecho	Christophe Beck
Raya and the Last Dragon	March 5, 2021	Don Hall; Carlos López Estrada Co-directors: Paul Briggs; John Ripa	Screenplay: Qui Nguyen & Adele Lim; Story: Paul Briggs, Don Hall, Adele Lim, Carlos López Estrada, Kiel Murray, Qui Nguyen, John Ripa & Dean Wellins	original story idea by Bradley Raymond	Osnat Shurer & Peter Del Vecho	James Newton Howard
Encanto	November 24, 2021	Jared Bush; Byron Howard Co-director: Charise Castro Smith	Screenplay: Charise Castro Smith & Jared Bush; Story: Jared Bush, Byron Howard, Charise Castro Smith, Jason Hand, Nancy Kruse & Lin-Manuel Miranda	—N/a	Yvett Merino & Clark Spencer	Germaine Franco
Strange World	November 23, 2022	Don Hall Co-director: Qui Nguyen	Qui Nguyen	—N/a	Roy Conli	Henry Jackman
Wish	November 22, 2023	Chris Buck; Fawn Veerasunthorn	Screenplay: Jennifer Lee & Allison Moore; Story: Jennifer Lee, Chris Buck, Fawn Veerasunthorn & Allison Moore	—N/a	Peter Del Vecho & Juan Pablo Reyes Lancaster-Jones	David Metzger
Moana 2	November 27, 2024	David Derrick Jr. Jason Hand; Dana Ledoux Miller	Screenplay: Jared Bush & Dana Ledoux Miller; Story: Jared Bush, Dana Ledoux Miller & Bek Smith	The film by Jared Bush	Christina Chen & Yvett Merino	Mark Mancina & Opetaia Foaʻi
Zootopia 2	November 26, 2025	Jared Bush; Byron Howard	Jared Bush	The film by Jared Bush & Phil Johnston	Yvett Merino	Michael Giacchino

== Upcoming films ==
Film	Release date	Director(s)	Writer(s)	Based on / Inspired by	Producer(s)	Composer(s)
Hexed	November 25, 2026	Fawn Veerasunthorn; Jason Hand Co-director: Josie Trinidad (Note: The film's initial announcement in 2025 listed Trinidad as director alongside Jason Hand, but at CinemaCon 2026, it was announced that Fawn Veerasunthorn would now be directing the film alongside Hand, with Trinidad still on board as co-director.)	Screenplay: Jared Bush & Dana Ledoux Miller; Story: Josie Trinidad	—N/a	Roy Conli; Yvett Merino	Kris Bowers
Frozen 3	November 24, 2027	Jennifer Lee Co-director: Trent Correy	Jennifer Lee	The film by Jennifer Lee	TBA	TBA
Clay	November 22, 2028	Fawn Veerasunthorn	TBA	—N/a	Peter Del Vecho	TBA

=== Unspecified projects ===
An unannounced film is scheduled to be released on June 15, 2029. In November 2026, Jared Bush confirmed that the project would be an original film.

=== In development ===
A fourth Frozen film is in development. In November 2023, Jennifer Lee revealed that ten projects are in development, including films based upon original ideas.

In July 2026, ahead of the release of the 2026 live-action remake of Moana (2016), Dwayne Johnson confirmed that a third animated film in the Moana franchise is in development.

In August 2026, it was revealed that a third Zootopia film is in development.

In November 2026, TheWrap reported that Don Hall returned to the studio on an unannounced project. The same month Jared Bush hinted that a new project based on a classic fairy tale was in development at the studio as well a new original musical film.

== Associated productions ==
Title	Release date	Studio	Visual effects / Animation service(s)
Hollywood Party	June 1, 1934	Metro-Goldwyn-Mayer	Main faculties
The Academy Award Review of Walt Disney Cartoons	May 19, 1937	Walt Disney Productions	Main faculties
The Reluctant Dragon	June 20, 1941	Walt Disney Productions	Main faculties
Victory Through Air Power	July 17, 1943	Walt Disney Productions	Main faculties
Song of the South	November 12, 1946	Walt Disney Productions	Main faculties
So Dear to My Heart	November 29, 1948	Walt Disney Productions	Main faculties
Mary Poppins	August 27, 1964	Walt Disney Productions	Main faculties
Bedknobs and Broomsticks	October 7, 1971	Walt Disney Productions	Main faculties
Pete's Dragon	November 3, 1977	Walt Disney Productions	Main faculties
Who Framed Roger Rabbit	June 22, 1988	Touchstone Pictures; Amblin Entertainment	Main faculties
DuckTales the Movie: Treasure of the Lost Lamp	August 3, 1990	Walt Disney Pictures; Disney MovieToons	Disney Animation France
The Nightmare Before Christmas	October 29, 1993	Touchstone Pictures; Skellington Productions	Second-layering traditional animation
A Goofy Movie	April 7, 1995	Walt Disney Pictures; Disney MovieToons	Disney Animation France; Disney Animation Australia; Disney Animation Canada (Toronto)
James and the Giant Peach	April 12, 1996	Walt Disney Pictures; Skellington Productions	Second-layering traditional animation
Saving Mr. Banks	December 13, 2013	Walt Disney Pictures	Tinker Bell animation recreation
Mary Poppins Returns	December 19, 2018	Walt Disney Pictures	Main faculties

== Reception ==
=== Box office grosses ===
Film	Budget	Opening	U.S. and Canada	International	Worldwide	Ref.
Snow White and the Seven Dwarfs	$1.5 million	—N/a	$184.9 million	$231.1 million	$416.0 million	
Pinocchio	$2.6 million	—N/a	$84.3 million	$37.5 million	$121.8 million	
Fantasia	$2.3 million	—N/a	$76.4 million	—N/a	—N/a	
Dumbo	$950,000	—N/a	$1.6 million	—N/a	—N/a	
Bambi	$1.7 million	—N/a	$102.2 million	$165.2 million	$267.4 million	
Saludos Amigos	—N/a	—N/a	—N/a	—N/a	—N/a	
The Three Caballeros	—N/a	—N/a	—N/a	—N/a	—N/a	
Make Mine Music	—N/a	—N/a	—N/a	$2.25 million	$2.25 million	
Fun and Fancy Free	—N/a	—N/a	—N/a	$2.4 million	$2.4 million	
Melody Time	—N/a	—N/a	—N/a	$1.8 million	$1.8 million	
The Adventures of Ichabod and Mr. Toad	—N/a	—N/a	—N/a	—N/a	—N/a	
Cinderella	$2.9 million	—N/a	$85.0 million	$178.6 million	$263.6 million	
Alice in Wonderland	$3 million	—N/a	$5.2 million	—N/a	—N/a	
Peter Pan	$4 million	—N/a	$87.4 million	$57.6 million	$145.0 million	
Lady and the Tramp	$4 million	—N/a	$93.6 million	—N/a	—N/a	
Sleeping Beauty	$6 million	—N/a	$51.6 million	—N/a	—N/a	
One Hundred and One Dalmatians	$3.6 million	—N/a	$144.9 million	$71.0 million	$215.9 million	
The Sword in the Stone	$3 million	—N/a	$22.2 million	—N/a	—N/a	
The Jungle Book	$4 million	—N/a	$141.8 million	$64.0 million	$205.8 million	
The Aristocats	$4 million	—N/a	$55.7 million	—N/a	—N/a	
Robin Hood	$5 million	—N/a	$32.1 million	—N/a	—N/a	
The Many Adventures of Winnie the Pooh	—N/a	—N/a	—N/a	—N/a	—N/a	
The Rescuers	$7.5 million	—N/a	$71.2 million	—N/a	—N/a	
The Fox and the Hound	$12 million	—N/a	$63.5 million	—N/a	—N/a	
The Black Cauldron	$44 million	$4.2 million	$21.3 million	—N/a	—N/a	
The Great Mouse Detective	$14 million	$3.2 million	$38.6 million	—N/a	—N/a	
Oliver & Company	$31 million	$4.0 million	$74.2 million	—N/a	—N/a	
The Little Mermaid	$40 million	$6.0 million	$111.5 million	$99.8 million	$211.3 million	
The Rescuers Down Under	—N/a	$3.5 million	$27.9 million	$19.5 million	$47.4 million	
Beauty and the Beast	$25 million	$9.6 million	$219.0 million	$206.0 million	$425.0 million	
Aladdin	$28 million	$19.3 million	$217.4 million	$286.7 million	$504.1 million	
The Lion King	$45 million	$40.9 million	$422.8 million	$545.7 million	$968.5 million	
Pocahontas	$55 million	$29.5 million	$141.6 million	$204.5 million	$346.1 million	
The Hunchback of Notre Dame	$70 million	$21.0 million	$100.1 million	$225.2 million	$325.3 million	
Hercules	$85 million	$21.5 million	$99.1 million	$153.6 million	$252.7 million	
Mulan	$90 million	$22.7 million	$120.6 million	$183.7 million	$304.3 million	
Tarzan	$130 million	$34.2 million	$171.1 million	$277.1 million	$448.2 million	
Fantasia 2000	$80 million	$2.9 million	$60.7 million	$30.2 million	$90.9 million	
Dinosaur	$127.5 million	$38.9 million	$137.7 million	$212.1 million	$349.8 million	
The Emperor's New Groove	$100 million	$9.8 million	$89.3 million	$80.0 million	$169.3 million	
Atlantis: The Lost Empire	$90–120 million	$20.3 million	$84.1 million	$102.0 million	$186.1 million	
Lilo & Stitch	$80 million	$35.3 million	$145.8 million	$127.3 million	$273.1 million	
Treasure Planet	$140 million	$12.1 million	$38.2 million	$71.4 million	$109.6 million	
Brother Bear	$46 million	$19.4 million	$85.3 million	$175.1 million	$250.4 million	
Home on the Range	$110 million	$13.9 million	$50.0 million	$95.5 million	$145.5 million	
Chicken Little	$150 million	$40 million	$135.4 million	$179.0 million	$314.4 million	
Meet the Robinsons	$150 million	$25.1 million	$97.8 million	$71.5 million	$169.3 million	
Bolt	$150 million	$26.2 million	$114.1 million	$195.9 million	$310.0 million	
The Princess and the Frog	$105 million	$0.79 million	$104.4 million	$162.6 million	$267.0 million	
Tangled	$260 million	$48.8 million	$200.8 million	$391.0 million	$591.8 million	
Winnie the Pooh	$30 million	$7.9 million	$26.7 million	$23.2 million	$49.9 million	
Wreck-It Ralph	$165 million	$49.0 million	$189.4 million	$281.8 million	$471.2 million	
Frozen	$150 million	$67.4 million	$400.7 million	$890.7 million	$1290 million	(Note: Frozen: "Frozen (2013) – International Box Office Results". Box Office Mojo. Archived from the original on August 9, 2014. "Worldwide – $1,282,147,791 (total as of August 8, 2014; including Japanese gross up to August 3, Spain gross up to July 27 and omitting Nigerian gross)"; "Frozen (2013) – International Box Office Results: Japan". Box Office Mojo. Archived from the original on September 15, 2014.; Total as of August 3, 2014: $247,650,477 Total as of August 31, 2014: $249,036,646: "Frozen (2013) – International Box Office Results: Spain". Box Office Mojo. Archived from the original on October 19, 2014.; Total as of July 27, 2014: $21,668,593 Total as of November 2, 2014: $22,492,845: "Frozen (2013) – International Box Office Results: Nigeria". Box Office Mojo. Archived from the original on September 5, 2014.; Total as of August 17, 2014: $167,333: "Frozen (2013) – International Box Office Results: United Kingdom". Box Office Mojo. Archived from the original on October 19, 2014.; Total as of June 8, 2014: £39,090,985 Total as of November 30, 2014: £40,960,083 ($1 = £0.63866) Total as of December 7, 2014: £41,087,765 ($1 = £0.64136) Total as of December 14, 2014: £41,170,608 ($1 = £0.636) Total as of November 26, 2017: £42,840,559 ($1 = £0.7497) Total as of December 3, 2017: £42,976,318 ($1 = £0.742): "Frozen (2013) – International Box Office Results: Germany". Box Office Mojo. Archived from the original on March 22, 2016.; Total as of March 30, 2014: €35,098,170 Total as of October 18, 2015: €42,526,744 nb. the exact euro to dollar conversion rate is unknown for earnings since April 2014, but the euro never fell below parity with the dollar during 2014 and 2015 (as can be verified by comparing the exchange rate on the individual date entries at the provided reference) so an approximate conversion rate of €1:$1 is used here to give a lower-bound.)
Big Hero 6	$165 million	$56.2 million	$222.5 million	$435.3 million	$657.8 million	
Zootopia	$150 million	$75.1 million	$341.3 million	$682.5 million	$1024 million	
Moana	$150–175 million	$56.6 million	$248.8 million	$394.6 million	$643.3 million	
Ralph Breaks the Internet	$175 million	$56.2 million	$201.1 million	$328.2 million	$529.3 million	
Frozen 2	$150 million	$130.3 million	$477.4 million	$972.7 million	$1450 million	
Raya and the Last Dragon	$100+ million	$8.5 million	$54.7 million	$75.7 million	$130.4 million	
Encanto	$120–150 million	$27.2 million	$96.1 million	$165.2 million	$261.3 million	
Strange World	$135–180 million	$12.2 million	$38.0 million	$35.7 million	$73.6 million	
Wish	$175–200 million	$19.7 million	$64.0 million	$191.0 million	$255.0 million	
Moana 2	$150 million	$139.8 million	$460.4 million	$598.8 million	$1059 million	
Zootopia 2	$150 million	$100.3 million	$425.8 million	$1433.4 million	$1859.2 million	

=== Critical response ===
Film	Critical		Public
Film	Rotten Tomatoes	Metacritic	CinemaScore
Snow White and the Seven Dwarfs	97%	96	—N/a
Pinocchio	100%	99	—N/a
Fantasia	95%	96	—N/a
Dumbo	95%	96	—N/a
Bambi	91%	91	—N/a
Saludos Amigos	82%	60	—N/a
The Three Caballeros	85%	85	—N/a
Make Mine Music	64%	60	—N/a
Fun and Fancy Free	73%	66	—N/a
Melody Time	69%	69	—N/a
The Adventures of Ichabod and Mr. Toad	89%	74	—N/a
Cinderella	95%	85	—N/a
Alice in Wonderland	82%	68	—N/a
Peter Pan	77%	76	—N/a
Lady and the Tramp	93%	78	—N/a
Sleeping Beauty	94%	85	—N/a
One Hundred and One Dalmatians	98%	83	—N/a
The Sword in the Stone	64%	61	—N/a
The Jungle Book	88%	65	—N/a
The Aristocats	63%	66	—N/a
Robin Hood	57%	57	—N/a
The Many Adventures of Winnie the Pooh	100%	—N/a	—N/a
The Rescuers	80%	74	—N/a
The Fox and the Hound	77%	65	—N/a
The Black Cauldron	59%	59	—N/a
The Great Mouse Detective	77%	73	—N/a
Oliver & Company	52%	58	—N/a
The Little Mermaid	92%	88	—N/a
The Rescuers Down Under	86%	68	—N/a
Beauty and the Beast	95%	95	A+
Aladdin	96%	86	A+
The Lion King	92%	88	A+
Pocahontas	58%	59	A−
The Hunchback of Notre Dame	80%	74	A
Hercules	83%	74	A
Mulan	92%	72	A+
Tarzan	90%	80	A
Fantasia 2000	80%	59	—N/a
Dinosaur	66%	56	A
The Emperor's New Groove	85%	70	A
Atlantis: The Lost Empire	49%	52	A
Lilo & Stitch	85%	74	A
Treasure Planet	68%	60	A−
Brother Bear	38%	48	A
Home on the Range	52%	50	A−
Chicken Little	36%	48	A−
Meet the Robinsons	68%	61	A−
Bolt	90%	67	A−
The Princess and the Frog	86%	73	A
Tangled	89%	71	A+
Winnie the Pooh	90%	74	A−
Wreck-It Ralph	87%	72	A
Frozen	89%	75	A+
Big Hero 6	90%	74	A
Zootopia	98%	78	A
Moana	96%	81	A
Ralph Breaks the Internet	88%	71	A−
Frozen 2	77%	64	A−
Raya and the Last Dragon	93%	74	A
Encanto	92%	75	A
Strange World	72%	65	B
Wish	48%	47	A−
Moana 2	61%	58	A−
Zootopia 2	92%	73	A

== Academy Award wins and nominations ==
Category	Nominee(s)	Result	Ref.
Snow White and the Seven Dwarfs
Music (Scoring)	Walt Disney Studio Music Department, Leigh Harline, head of department (Score by Frank Churchill, Leigh Harline and Paul J. Smith)	Nominated	
Special Award	To Walt Disney for Snow White and the Seven Dwarfs, recognized as a significant screen innovation which has charmed millions and pioneered a great new entertainment field for the motion picture cartoon. Noticeable for the fact that Walt Disney was given a special Oscar trophy with seven smaller Oscars aside.	Won	
Pinocchio
Music (Original Score)	Leigh Harline, Paul J. Smith, Ned Washington	Won	
Music (Song)	"When You Wish Upon a Star," Music by Leigh Harline; Lyrics by Ned Washington	Won	
Fantasia
Special Award	To Walt Disney, William Garity, John N. A. Hawkins and the RCA Manufacturing Company for their outstanding contribution to the advancement of the use of sound in motion pictures through the production of Fantasia.	Won	
Special Award	To Leopold Stokowski and his associates for their unique achievement in the creation of a new form of visualized music in Walt Disney's production, Fantasia, thereby widening the scope of the motion picture as entertainment and as an art form.	Won	
Dumbo
Music (Scoring of a Musical Picture)	Frank Churchill, Oliver Wallace	Won	
Music (Song)	"Baby Mine," Music by Frank Churchill; Lyrics by Ned Washington	Nominated	
Bambi
Music (Music Score of a Dramatic or Comedy Picture)	Frank Churchill, Edward H. Plumb	Nominated	
Music (Song)	"Love Is a Song," Music by Frank Churchill; Lyrics by Larry Morey	Nominated	
Sound Recording	Walt Disney Studio Sound Department, Sam Slyfield, Sound Director	Nominated	
Saludos Amigos
Music (Scoring of a Musical Picture)	Charles Wolcott, Edward H. Plumb, Paul J. Smith	Nominated	
Music (Song)	"Saludos Amigos," Music by Charles Wolcott; Lyrics by Ned Washington	Nominated	
Sound Recording	Walt Disney Studio Sound Department, C. O. Slyfield, Sound Director	Nominated	
The Three Caballeros
Music (Scoring of a Musical Picture)	Charles Wolcott, Edward H. Plumb, Paul J. Smith	Nominated	
Sound Recording	Walt Disney Studio Sound Department, C. O. Slyfield, Sound Director	Nominated	
Cinderella
Music (Scoring of a Musical Picture)	Oliver Wallace, Paul J. Smith	Nominated	
Music (Song)	"Bibbidi-Bobbidi-Boo," Music and Lyrics by Mack David, Al Hoffman and Jerry Livingston	Nominated	
Sound Recording	Walt Disney Studio Sound Department, C. O. Slyfield, Sound Director	Nominated	
Alice in Wonderland
Music (Scoring of a Musical Picture)	Oliver Wallace	Nominated	
Sleeping Beauty
Music (Scoring of a Musical Picture)	George Bruns	Nominated	
The Sword in the Stone
Music (Score of a Music – Adaptation or Treatment)	George Bruns	Nominated	
The Jungle Book
Music (Song)	"The Bare Necessities," Music and Lyrics by Terry Gilkyson	Nominated	
Robin Hood
Music (Song)	"Love," Music by George Bruns; Lyrics by Floyd Huddleston	Nominated	
The Rescuers
Music (Original Song)	"Someone's Waiting for You," Music by Sammy Fain; Lyrics by Carol Connors and Ayn Robbins	Nominated	
The Little Mermaid
Music (Original Score)	Alan Menken	Won	
Music (Original Song)	"Under the Sea," Music by Alan Menken; Lyric by Howard Ashman	Won	
Music (Original Song)	"Kiss the Girl," Music by Alan Menken; Lyric by Howard Ashman	Nominated	
Beauty and the Beast
Music (Original Score)	Alan Menken	Won	
Music (Original Song)	"Beauty and the Beast," Music by Alan Menken; Lyric by Howard Ashman	Won	
Music (Original Song)	"Be Our Guest," Music by Alan Menken; Lyric by Howard Ashman	Nominated	
Music (Original Song)	"Belle," Music by Alan Menken; Lyric by Howard Ashman	Nominated	
Best Picture	Don Hahn, Producer	Nominated	
Sound	Terry Porter, Mel Metcalfe, David J. Hudson, Doc Kane	Nominated	
Aladdin
Music (Original Score)	Alan Menken	Won	
Music (Original Song)	"A Whole New World," Music by Alan Menken; Lyric by Tim Rice	Won	
Music (Original Song)	"Friend Like Me," Music by Alan Menken; Lyric by Howard Ashman	Nominated	
Sound	Terry Porter, Mel Metcalfe, David J. Hudson, Doc Kane	Nominated	
Sound Effects Editing	Mark Mangini	Nominated	
The Lion King
Music (Original Score)	Hans Zimmer	Won	
Music (Original Song)	"Can You Feel the Love Tonight," Music by Elton John; Lyric by Tim Rice	Won	
Music (Original Song)	"Circle of Life," Music by Elton John; Lyric by Tim Rice	Nominated	
Music (Original Song)	"Hakuna Matata," Music by Elton John; Lyric by Tim Rice	Nominated	
Pocahontas
Music (Original Musical or Comedy Score)	Music by Alan Menken; Lyrics by Stephen Schwartz; Orchestral Score by Alan Menken	Won	
Music (Original Song)	"Colors of the Wind," Music by Alan Menken; Lyric by Stephen Schwartz	Won	
The Hunchback of Notre Dame
Music (Original Musical or Comedy Score)	Music by Alan Menken; Lyrics by Stephen Schwartz; Orchestral Score by Alan Menken	Nominated	
Hercules
Music (Original Song)	"Go the Distance," Music by Alan Menken; Lyric by David Zippel	Nominated	
Mulan
Music (Original Musical or Comedy Score)	Music by Matthew Wilder; Lyrics by David Zippel; Orchestral Score by Jerry Goldsmith	Nominated	
Tarzan
Music (Original Song)	"You'll Be in My Heart," Music and Lyric by Phil Collins	Won	
The Emperor's New Groove
Music (Original Song)	"My Funny Friend and Me," Music by Sting and David Hartley; Lyric by Sting	Nominated	
Lilo & Stitch
Animated Feature Film	Chris Sanders	Nominated	
Treasure Planet
Animated Feature Film	Ron Clements	Nominated	
Brother Bear
Animated Feature Film	Aaron Blaise and Robert Walker	Nominated	
Bolt
Animated Feature Film	Chris Williams and Byron Howard	Nominated	
The Princess and the Frog
Animated Feature Film	John Musker and Ron Clements	Nominated	
Music (Original Song)	"Almost There," Music and Lyric by Randy Newman	Nominated	
Music (Original Song)	"Down in New Orleans," Music and Lyric by Randy Newman	Nominated	
Tangled
Music (Original Song)	"I See the Light," Music by Alan Menken; Lyric by Glenn Slater	Nominated	
Wreck-It Ralph
Animated Feature Film	Rich Moore	Nominated	
Frozen
Animated Feature Film	Chris Buck, Jennifer Lee and Peter Del Vecho	Won	
Music (Original Song)	"Let It Go," Music and Lyric by Kristen Anderson-Lopez and Robert Lopez	Won	
Big Hero 6
Animated Feature Film	Don Hall, Chris Williams and Roy Conli	Won	
Zootopia
Animated Feature Film	Byron Howard, Rich Moore and Clark Spencer	Won	
Moana
Animated Feature Film	John Musker, Ron Clements and Osnat Shurer	Nominated	
Music (Original Song)	"How Far I'll Go," Music and Lyric by Lin-Manuel Miranda	Nominated	
Ralph Breaks the Internet
Animated Feature Film	Rich Moore, Phil Johnston and Clark Spencer	Nominated	
Frozen 2
Music (Original Song)	"Into the Unknown," Music and Lyric by Kristen Anderson-Lopez & Robert Lopez	Nominated	
Raya and the Last Dragon
Animated Feature Film	Don Hall, Carlos López Estrada, Osnat Shurer and Peter Del Vecho	Nominated	
Encanto
Animated Feature Film	Jared Bush, Byron Howard, Yvett Merino and Clark Spencer	Won	
Music (Original Score)	Germaine Franco	Nominated	
Music (Original Song)	"Dos Oruguitas," Music and Lyric by Lin-Manuel Miranda	Nominated	
Zootopia 2
Animated Feature Film	Jared Bush, Byron Howard and Yvett Merino	Nominated	

== See also ==
- List of Walt Disney Animation Studios short films
- List of Walt Disney Pictures films
- List of remakes and adaptations of Disney animated films
- List of Disney theatrical animated features
- List of Pixar films
- List of 20th Century Studios theatrical animated feature films
- List of Blue Sky Studios productions
- List of unproduced Disney animated projects
- Disneytoon Studios
