= List of Frozen characters =

The five main characters of the franchise in Olaf's Frozen Adventure. From left to right: Kristoff, Anna, Elsa, Sven, and Olaf.

This is a list of characters from Disney's Frozen franchise, which consists of the animated films Frozen (2013) and Frozen 2 (2019), several short films and specials, and other media appearances.

== Introduced in Frozen ==
=== Trolls ===
The Trolls are creatures that camouflage themselves in the form of rocks, residing in the Valley of the Living Rock. When Kristoff brings Anna to them, the Trolls sing "Fixer Upper" in order to get them together. They also appear in LEGO Frozen Northern Lights, throwing a big party during Grand Pabbie's absence. The trolls also make a cameo appearance in the 2023 short film Once Upon a Studio, appearing in the form of rocks and causing Aladdin to slide on them.

==== Grand Pabbie ====
Grand Pabbie
- First appearance: Frozen (2013)
- Portrayed by: Timothy Hughes (2018 musical)
- Voiced by: Ciarán Hinds; John Rhys-Davies (Once Upon a Time)

In-universe information
- Species: Troll
- Gender: Male
- Occupation: King of the Trolls
- Nationality: Arendelle (Valley of the Living Rock)

Grand Pabbie is the leader of the trolls. He has magical abilities, which is why King Agnarr went looking for him when Anna was little and was hit on the head by Elsa's powers, which Big Pabbie helped her with, but made Anna forget Elsa's ice powers. Years later, after Anna is struck again by Elsa's ice powers, this time in her heart, Grand Pabbie tells her that there is nothing she can do since only an act of true love would save her.

In Frozen 2, Grand Pabbie arrives with the other trolls in the town of Arendelle after suffering an earthquake, telling the protagonists that they will find the answers they are looking for to what happens in the Enchanted Forest, leaving him in the care of Arendelle during their absence.

In LEGO Frozen Northern Lights, the protagonists visit the Valley of the Living Rock to question Grand Pabbie about the disappearance of Arendelle's northern lights, but the trolls tell them that Grand Pabbie headed off on the northern trail, so they start a mission to find him. When they do, Pabbie explains that every 500 years, he uses four crystals to refract the northern lights to reign over Arendelle, and they didn't appear on schedule because he only had one, and was waiting for Anna, Kristoff, and Elsa to bring him the other three crystals.

Grand Pabbie also has a cameo appearance in the 2023 short film Once Upon a Studio, appearing in a line of Walt Disney Animation Studios characters going down the stairs to go outside the studio, and later being part of the group photo with the rest of the characters.

An alternate version of Grand Pabbie appears in the television series Once Upon a Time in the season 4 episodes "A Tale of Two Sisters", "Family Business", and "The Snow Queen", receiving visits from characters seeking advice.

Grand Pabbie also appears in the video game Disney Magic Kingdoms, as a playable character to unlock during a limited time.

==== Bulda ====
Bulda
- First appearance: Frozen (2013)
- Portrayed by: Olivia Phillip (2018 musical)
- Voiced by: Maia Wilson

In-universe information
- Species: Troll
- Gender: Female
- Spouse: Cliff (husband)
- Children: Kristoff (adoptive son); Sven (adoptive son)
- Nationality: Arendelle (Valley of the Living Rock)

Bulda is a female troll, and the adoptive mother of Kristoff and Sven, adopting them after meeting them when they were little. When Kristoff arrives in the Valley of the Living Rock accompanied by Anna, she tries to convince her that Kristoff would be a good suitor, and ends up singing "Fixer Upper" with the other trolls to get them together. Her husband, Cliff, is seen when they both kiss each other before Anna and Kristoff leave the Valley of the Living Rock.

In Frozen II, Bulda arrives with the other trolls in the town of Arendelle after suffering an earthquake.

=== Oaken ===
Oaken
- First appearance: Frozen (2013)
- Portrayed by: Darcey Johnson (Once Upon a Time); Kevin Del Aguila (2018 musical)
- Voiced by: Chris Williams

In-universe information
- Species: Human
- Gender: Male
- Occupation: Owner of Wandering Oaken's Trading Post and Sauna
- Children: Several children
- Nationality: Arendelle

Oaken is the owner of Wandering Oaken's Trading Post and Sauna. Anna visits his store to buy winter clothes, at the same time that Kristoff arrives to buy some rope and carrots. Oaken gives a high price for Kristoff's items, to which Kristoff protests, due to the little amount of money he has, calling Oaken a crook, an insult that causes Oaken to throw Kristoff out of his store without selling a thing. After this, Oaken returns to his amiable attitude toward Anna, who purchases Kristoff's items along with hers.

In Frozen Fever, Oaken appears participating in the musical number "Making Today a Perfect Day".

In Olaf's Frozen Adventure he is one of the people Olaf asks for advice on Christmas traditions, in his case being relaxing in the sauna with his family.

He is also seen in Frozen 2 fleeing from Arendelle along with the other citizens after the earthquake in the town.

In Once Upon a Snowman, Oaken helps Olaf find a perfect nose for him among the items in his store.

He also appears in LEGO Frozen Northern Lights, where he opens an ice cream stand and the characters talk to him about getting to the northern lights. He offers them his items at prices Kristoff complains about, causing Oaken to get angry and throw Kristoff into the river.

Oaken also has a cameo appearance in the 2023 short film Once Upon a Studio, as part of the Walt Disney Animation Studios characters who gather outside the studio while Mickey Mouse organizes them, and being part of the group photo with the rest of the characters.

An alternate version of Oaken also appears in the television series Once Upon a Time in the season 4 episode "Family Business", where Belle stops in his store by asking where to find rock trolls.

Oaken also appears in the video game Disney Magic Kingdoms, as a playable character to unlock during a limited time.

=== Duke of Weselton ===
Duke of Weselton
- First appearance: Frozen (2013)
- Portrayed by: Jonathan Runyon (Once Upon a Time); Robert Creighton (2018 musical)
- Voiced by: Alan Tudyk

In-universe information
- Nickname: Duke of Weaseltown
- Species: Human
- Gender: Male
- Occupation: Duke
- Nationality: Weselton

The Duke of Weselton is a dignitary from Arendelle's neighboring duchy Weselton, and the secondary antagonist of Frozen. Weselton was, for many years, Arendelle's closest partner in trade, and the Duke maintained a healthy business relationship with Arendelle for the purpose of exploiting the kingdom's riches. He's determined to get close to the new queen Elsa, until her magical secret is revealed. Then he's the first to call her a monster and try to turn her own kingdom against her. At the end of the film, Kai announces that Arendelle would no longer have relations with Weselton. A recurring gag is that his home territory's name is mispronounced as "Weaseltown", which irritates him.

Although the Duke of Weselton does not appear physically in Frozen 2, while Elsa is in Ahtohallan traversing the caverns she encounters snowy manifestations of various figures from her past, including the Duke.

The Duke of Weselton appears as the main antagonist of LEGO Disney Frozen: Operation Puffins, where after losing his position for his actions, he trains a group of puffins to steal the pieces of Arendelle Castle, in order to build his own castle while taking revenge on Elsa and Anna in the process.

An alternate and younger version of the Duke of Weselton also appears in the television series Once Upon a Time in the season 4 episode "The Snow Queen", attempting to woo the princess Helga of Arendelle out of self-interest, and later trying to do the same with her sister Ingrid, who scared him away with her ice powers.

The Duke of Weselton also appears in the video game Disney Magic Kingdoms, as a playable character to unlock during a limited time.

=== Marshmallow ===
Marshmallow
- First appearance: Frozen (2013)
- Voiced by: Paul Briggs

In-universe information
- Species: Snowman
- Occupation: Guardian of Elsa's ice palace
- Family: Elsa (creator); Olaf (brother); Snowgies (brothers)
- Nationality: Arendelle (North Mountain)

Marshmallow is an enormous icy snowman born from Elsa's powers. He serves as a brute bodyguard charged with keeping intruders away from her ice palace. The menacing white beast doesn't say much, but he packs a powerful punch. He took it upon himself to expel Anna, Olaf, and Kristoff from Elsa's ice palace, and ended up chasing them after Anna angered him by throwing a snowball at him, until they manage to run away from him. Later, he confronts Hans and the other men who were looking for Elsa, the confrontation ending with Marshmallow falling down the mountain. In a post-credits scene, Marshmallow returns to the ice palace, where he finds Elsa's crown and places it on top of its head.

In Frozen Fever, he appears in the post-credits scene, where Olaf and Kristoff arrive at the ice palace to leave the Snowgies in his care, much to his surprise. In Frozen 2, he appears again in a post-credits scene, where Olaf recaps for him and the Snowglies the story of the events of the film.

In the series of shorts Olaf Presents, Marshmallow appears in the episodes "Moana", representing the role of Te Kā, "The Lion King", representing the role of Mufasa's ghost, and "Aladdin", representing the role of the Cave of Wonders.

He also appears in LEGO Frozen Northern Lights, where along with the Snowgies help the protagonists with their sleigh so they can continue their journey.

In LEGO Disney Frozen: Operation Puffins, he appears lovingly caring for the Snowgies in Elsa's ice castle. After Elsa asks him for help, he goes with her, creating an ice path to glide down and rescue Anna, Olaf, Kristoff, and Sven from the Duke of Weselton. He eventually wins the affection of the Puffins the Duke of Weselton had trained, causing them to join him and the Snowgies.

Marshmallow is also one of the characters featured in the video game Disney Magical World 2.

In the video game Kingdom Hearts III, Marshmallow initially fills a role similar to that of Frozen, driving the characters out of the ice palace, and Sora, the game's protagonist, facing off against Marshmallow as an enemy boss. Subsequently, Sora meets Marshmallow again at the moment when Hans takes Elsa away, and seeing that the snow monster wanted to save Elsa, Marshmallow becomes Sora's party member from then on.

He also appears in the video game Disney Magic Kingdoms as a playable character to unlock during a limited time, with his "Angry" appearance being available as a costume for him.

An alternate version of Marshmallow also appears in the television series Once Upon a Time, being created by Elsa in the episode "A Tale of Two Sisters", to protect herself from Emma and Hook, until he ends up being destroyed by Regina.

=== King Agnarr and Queen Iduna ===
King Agnarr and Queen Iduna
- First appearance: Frozen (2013)
- Portrayed by: King Agnarr: Oliver Rice (Once Upon a Time); James Brown III (2018 musical); Queen Iduna: Pascale Hutton (Once Upon a Time); Ava Marie Telek (Once Upon a Time; young); Ann Sanders (2018 musical)
- Voiced by: King Agnarr: Maurice LaMarche (Frozen); Alfred Molina (Frozen 2); Jackson Stein (Frozen II; young); Queen Iduna: Jennifer Lee (Frozen); Evan Rachel Wood (Frozen 2); Delaney Rose Stein (Frozen 2; young)

In-universe information
- Species: Humans
- Gender: Male (King Agnarr); Female (Queen Iduna)
- Occupation: Rulers of Arendelle
- Children: Elsa (daughter); Anna (daughter)
- Relatives: Runeard (Agnarr's father)
- Nationality: Arendelle

King Agnarr and Queen Iduna are the parents of Anna and Elsa, and former rulers of Arendelle. When their daughters were little, Elsa accidentally injured Anna with her ice powers, so her parents rushed her to see the trolls for care. After that, they decided to separate the two sisters for safety, until Elsa could get control of her powers. Years later, both died during a boat trip.

In Olaf's Frozen Adventure it is mentioned that, before the decision to separate Anna and Elsa, they annually rang the Yule Bell with their daughters as to signify the beginning of the Christmas holiday season in Arendelle.

In the prologue of Frozen 2, they tells the girls the story of an enchanted forest King Agnarr saw in his youth, and recounts the war that had broken out between Arendelle and the Northuldra tribe, during which his father fell to his death, and how the fighting angered the spirits of the forest. In the present, their daughters ended up traveling to that forest, where they discovered that their mother was a Northuldra.

Both are also the central characters of the novel Frozen II: Dangerous Secrets, where their backstory in their youth is told.

In the book Conceal, Don't Feel: A Twisted Tale, in an alternative reality in which after taking their daughters to see the trolls everything gets complicated in a curse which will cause Anna to turn to ice if she spends too long in proximity to Elsa, in order to protect their children Elsa and Anna's memories of each other are erased, and Anna is left with a baker and his wife, the wife being an old friend of Iduna. Iduna often visits Anna in the bakery under an alias, but never reveals that she is Anna's mother before her death.

An alternate version of them also appears during the season 4 of the television series Once Upon a Time, with the King of Arendelle being unnamed, and his wife being named Gerda, as a reference to the original female protagonist of the fairy tale The Snow Queen, and in this version being one of the princesses of the royal family of Arendelle. Both appear in the prologue of "A Tale of Two Sisters", showing the moment in which their ship was about to sink. Gerda returns in the episode "The Snow Queen", showing her past and relationship with her two sisters, Ingrid and Helga.

=== Kai ===
Kai
- First appearance: Frozen (2013)
- Voiced by: Stephen Anderson

In-universe information
- Species: Human
- Gender: Male
- Occupation: Advisor of Arendelle's royal family
- Nationality: Arendelle

Kai is the overseer and steward of Arendelle Castle and a trusted advisor to Elsa, and later to Anna after she becomes the new queen of Arendelle. His name is a reference to the original male protagonist of the fairy tale The Snow Queen. Kai introduces the Duke of Weselton to the royal siblings, but mistakenly mispronounces his home's name as "Weaseltown", leading him to be sternly corrected by the Duke. After Elsa finally returns to Arendelle and lifts the winter curse, Kai is made aware of Hans' fate by the French dignitary. Kai then informs the Duke of Weselton that Arendelle will be cutting ties with Weselton permanently, sardonically pronouncing his home's name as "Weaseltown" to the Duke's irritation.

In Olaf's Frozen Adventure, Kai is seen tending to Christmas preparations in the castle, when he is surprised by Olaf, who bursts out of a tree. Near the climax, Kai, Anna, and Elsa learn from Sven that Olaf has gotten lost in the woods and is being chased by hungry wolves.

In Frozen II Kai appears informing Elsa about the guests who just arrived at the castle. After Elsa awakens the spirits of the Enchanted Forest and an earthquake is caused, Kai emerges from the castle with Anna and other servants just in time to see the water in the fountains drying up. At the end of the film, Kai introduces Anna as the new Queen of Arendelle.

=== Erik and Francis ===
Erik and Francis
- First appearance: Frozen (2013)

In-universe information
- Species: Humans
- Gender: Male
- Occupation: Duke of Weselton's bodyguards
- Nationality: Weselton

Erik and Francis are Duke of Weselton's bodyguards. The Duke volunteers them to go looking for Elsa, and secretly orders them to eliminate her should they find her. Once in the ice palace created by Elsa, they try to attack her, but Elsa defends herself thanks to her ice powers.

They make a minor appearance in LEGO Disney Frozen: Operation Puffins, where they abandon the Duke of Weselton after he loses his status.

=== Wolves ===
Wolves
- First appearance: Frozen (2013)

In-universe information
- Species: Wolves
- Nationality: Arendelle (North Mountain)

The Wolves are minor antagonists of the film, being a pack of wolves that start chasing Kristoff's sleigh in the woods, until the characters manage to flee from them by jumping over a cliff.

In Olaf's Frozen Adventure, the wolves chase Olaf through the forest while he tries to keep his fruitcake safe.

In Once Upon a Snowman, they start chasing Olaf because of the sausage he was wearing for a nose. After a chase, Olaf manages to escape from them. After that, he meets a wolf that he sees hungry and saddened, so he decides to give him his sausage to feed him, making the wolf happy.

=== Sitron ===
Sitron
- First appearance: Frozen (2013)

In-universe information
- Species: Horse
- Gender: Male
- Occupation: Hans's mount
- Nationality: Southern Isles

Sitron is Hans's horse. When he and his owner crash into Anna while she was running through Arendelle, Sitron holds onto the boat where Anna fell while Hans helps her up. But as soon as Anna leaves, Sitron accidentally lets go of the boat, causing Hans, who was still on top of it, to fall into the water. Later, Hans uses it to ride into the mountains in search of Elsa until they reaches the ice palace created by her.

== Introduced in Frozen Fever ==
=== Snowgies ===
Snowgies
- First appearance: Frozen Fever (2015)

In-universe information
- Species: Snowmen
- Family: Elsa (creator); Olaf (brother); Marhmallow (brother)
- Nationality: Arendelle

The Snowgies are tiny little snowmen, accidentally created by Elsa every time she sneezes due to her cold. Before long, she ends up creating a large number of Snowgies that create chaos in preparation for Anna's birthday party. Eventually, they end up being taken to Elsa's ice palace, where Marshmallow now lives, to make it the new home for them. At that moment it seems that Olaf gave each of them a name, naming some of them when they entered the palace, among them Slush, Sludge, Slide, Ansel, Flake, Flurry, Fridge, Powder, Crystal, Squalor, Pat, Sphere, and William.

In Frozen II, they appear in a post-credits scene, where Olaf recaps for them and Marshmallow the story of the events of the film.

In the series of shorts Olaf Presents they appear helping Olaf with his reenactments of the stories.

In LEGO Frozen Northern Lights, the Snowgies accompany the main characters during the prologue to see the aurora borealis, traveling in a sleigh with Elsa and Olaf. Later, they and Marshmallow help the protagonists with their sleigh so they can continue their journey.

In LEGO Disney Frozen: Operation Puffins], they are shown living comfortably in Elsa's ice castle, where Marshmallow lovingly cares for them.

== Introduced in Olaf's Frozen Adventure ==
=== Mr. and Mrs. Olsen ===
Mr. and Mrs. Olsen
- First appearance: Olaf's Frozen Adventure (2017)
- Voiced by: Mr. Olsen: John de Lancie; Mrs. Olsen: Lauri Fraser

In-universe information
- Full name: Olga Olsen (Mrs. Olsen)
- Species: Humans
- Gender: Male (Mr. Olsen); Female (Mrs. Olsen)
- Family: Three gradchildren
- Nationality: Arendelle

Mr. Olsen and Olga Olsen are an old couple that Elsa invites to spend Christmas in Arendelle's castle, but they reject the offer, since they have to go home to knit socks for their grandchildren since it is their Christmas tradition. Their house is one of many that Olaf visits during the musical number "That Time of Year", where it is shown that they have already knitted sweaters and a long scarf, with Mr. Olsen dancing in a room with his grandchildren, while Mrs. Olsen is in another accompanied by a lot of cats.

== Introduced in Frozen 2 ==
=== Mattias ===
General Destin Mattias
- First appearance: Frozen 2 (2019)
- Voiced by: Sterling K. Brown

In-universe information
- Alias: Lieutenant Mattias (former)
- Species: Human
- Gender: Male
- Occupation: General of Arendelle Royal Guard; Lieutenant of Arendelle Royal Guard (former)
- Affiliation: Arendelle Royal Guard
- Nationality: Arendelle

General Destin Mattias, previously dubbed Lieutenant Mattias, was in the past King Runeard's lieutenant and Prince Agnarr's official guard. After a war between the Arendellians and the Northuldra tribe, he and several Arendelle guards were trapped in the Enchanted Forest for years, until the arrival of the protagonists. He eventually returned to Arendelle, becoming the kingdom's general under Anna's new reign.

Mattias also has a cameo appearance in the 2023 short film Once Upon a Studio, appearing when the Fairy Godmother helps Goofy prepare the camera with which to take the group photo of the Walt Disney Animation Studios characters, of which Mattias is also a part.

=== Northuldra ===
The Northuldra are an indigenous group who live within the Enchanted Forest, north of Arendelle, and are known as the "people of the sun". They are deeply connected to the magic of the forest and its elemental spirits.

==== Yelana ====
Yelana
- First appearance: Frozen 2 (2019)
- Voiced by: Martha Plimpton

In-universe information
- Species: Human
- Gender: Female
- Occupation: Leader of the Northuldra
- Affiliation: Northuldra
- Nationality: Enchanted Forest

Yelana is the leader of the Northuldra. She is fiercely protective of her community, but is known to soften when people show an understanding of nature and their environment.

==== Ryder ====
Ryder
- First appearance: Frozen 2 (2019)
- Voiced by: Jason Ritter

In-universe information
- Full name: Ryder Nattura
- Species: Human
- Gender: Male
- Occupation: Reindeer herder
- Affiliation: Northuldra
- Family: Honeymaren (sister)
- Nationality: Enchanted Forest

Ryder Nattura is a member of the Northuldra tribe who become a friend with the protagonists, and Honeymaren's brother. Ryder is a reindeer herder, so he quickly befriends Kristoff, whom he helps by advising him about his relationship with Anna.

He also has a cameo appearance in the 2023 short film Once Upon a Studio, where along with his sister, Kristoff, Sven and several characters from The Wind in the Willows they go to take a group photo with the rest of the Walt Disney Animation Studios characters outside the studio, later appearing among the characters in said photo.

Ryder also appears in the video game Disney Magic Kingdoms, as a playable character to unlock during a limited time.

==== Honeymaren ====
Honeymaren
- First appearance: Frozen 2 (2019)
- Voiced by: Rachel Matthews

In-universe information
- Species: Human
- Gender: Female
- Affiliation: Northuldra
- Family: Ryder (brother)
- Nationality: Enchanted Forest

Honeymaren is a member of the Northuldra tribe who become friends with the protagonists, and Ryder's sister.

She also has a cameo appearance in the 2023 short film Once Upon a Studio, where along with her brother, Kristoff, Sven and several characters from The Wind in the Willows they go to take a group photo with the rest of the Walt Disney Animation Studios characters outside the studio, later appearing among the characters in said photo.

Honeymaren also appears in the video game Disney Magic Kingdoms, as a playable character to unlock during a limited time.

=== Spirits of the Enchanted Forest ===
The Spirits of the Enchanted Forest, also known as the Elements, are five elemental mythical creatures that harness the magic of nature, these elements include water, fire, wind, earth, and a fifth spirit (Elsa) that bridges magic and humanity.

==== The Nokk ====
The Nokk
- First appearance: Frozen 2 (2019)

In-universe information
- Alias: Water Spirit
- Species: Spirit (horse-shaped water)
- Nationality: Enchanted Forest (Dark Sea)

The Nokk, or Water Spirit, is the horse-shaped elemental spirit of water that serves as the guardian of the Dark Sea. It ends up becoming Elsa's mount.

==== Bruni ====
Bruni
- First appearance: Frozen 2 (2019)

In-universe information
- Alias: Fire Spirit
- Species: Spirit / Salamander
- Nationality: Enchanted Forest

Bruni, or Fire Spirit, is a small blue salamander, and the elemental spirit of fire, being able to create flames around his body. Elsa quickly wins his affection, as he likes the ice she creates.

In the series of shorts Olaf Presents, Bruni appears in the episode "Tangled", representing the role of Pascal.

Bruni also has a cameo appearance in the 2023 short film Once Upon a Studio, appearing over Baymax's head when the Fairy Godmother helps Goofy prepare the camera with which to take the group photo of the Walt Disney Animation Studios characters, of which Bruni is also a part. He also appears during the end credits accompanied by Pascal.

He also appears in the video game Disney Magic Kingdoms, being called only "Fire Spirit", as a playable character to unlock during a limited time.

==== Gale ====
Gale
- First appearance: Frozen 2 (2019)

In-universe information
- Alias: Wind Spirit
- Species: Spirit (made of wind)
- Nationality: Enchanted Forest

Gale, or Wind Spirit, is the elemental spirit of wind that dwells within the Enchanted Forest. Its presence is mainly noticed when it moves the leaves near the characters.

In the series of shorts Olaf Presents, Gale appears in the episode "Tangled", taking charge of making the lanterns float.

==== Earth Giants ====
Earth Giants
- First appearance: Frozen 2 (2019)

In-universe information
- Species: Spirits / Earth Giants
- Nationality: Enchanted Forest

The Earth Giants are a race of mountain-sized rock spirits from the Enchanted Forest, representing the element of earth.

=== King Runeard ===
King Runeard
- First appearance: Frozen 2 (2019)
- Voiced by: Jeremy Sisto

In-universe information
- Species: Human
- Gender: Male
- Occupation: King of Arendelle
- Children: Agnarr (son)
- Relatives: Elsa (granddaughter); Anna (granddaughter)
- Nationality: Arendelle

King Runeard was the ruler of Arendelle, and the father of King Agnarr. In his lifetime, Runeard was revered as a noble and generous leader. In truth, however, he was a ruthless, paranoid tyrant who believed magic to be a threat to his kingship. In his attempt to eliminate the Northuldra, Runeard sparked a decades-long catastrophe that was then left to his granddaughters, Anna and Elsa, to rectify.

== Introduced in Frozen Northern Lights ==
=== Little Rock ===
Little Rock
- First appearance: Journey to the Lights (2016)

In-universe information
- Species: Troll
- Gender: Male
- Nationality: Arendelle (Valley of the Living Rock)

Little Rock is a young troll, and one of the protagonists along with the other five main characters of the franchise in the Frozen Northern Lights book series.

== Introduced in LEGO Disney Frozen: Operation Puffins ==
=== The Puffins ===
The Puffins
- First appearance: LEGO Disney Frozen: Operation Puffins (2025)

In-universe information
- Species: Puffins
- Nationality: Norway

The Puffins are an army of puffins trained by the Duke of Weselton to steal the pieces of Arendelle Castle. During the operation, Marshmallow ends up winning their affection, causing them to abandon the Duke.

== See also ==
- The Snow Queen, fairy tale on whose characters the protagonists of Frozen are based
- List of Once Upon a Time characters, TV series which features alternate versions of the characters and other original characters from the show related with them
