= Making Today a Perfect Day =

Song from 2015 short film Frozen Fever

Single by Idina Menzel, Kristen Bell and the cast of Frozen Fever
- Released: March 12, 2015
- Recorded: 2014
- Genre: Show tune
- Length: 4:58
- Label: Walt Disney Records
- Songwriters: Kristen Anderson-Lopez; Robert Lopez
- Producers: Kristen Anderson-Lopez; Robert Lopez

Idina Menzel singles chronology
"Baby, It's Cold Outside" (2014)	"Making Today a Perfect Day" (2015)	"Queen of Swords" (2016)

"Making Today a Perfect Day" is a song from the 2015 Walt Disney Animation Studios animated short film Frozen Fever, with music and lyrics by Kristen Anderson-Lopez and Robert Lopez and performed throughout most of the short. It was released as a single in the United States on March 12, 2015.

== Production and writing ==
On September 2, 2014, during the ABC airing of The Story of Frozen: Making a Disney Animated Classic, Walt Disney Animation Studios' chief creative officer John Lasseter announced that a Frozen short film with a new song would be released in the future. On the same day, Variety announced that the short would be released in early 2015 under the title Frozen Fever, with Chris Buck and Jennifer Lee returning as co-directors, Peter Del Vecho returning as producer, and a new song by Kristen Anderson-Lopez and Robert Lopez. In a mid-October interview, Idina Menzel revealed that the cast had already recorded their vocal tracks, stating "We just worked on a short for Frozen." On December 3, 2014, it was announced that Aimee Scribner would be a co-producer and that Frozen Fever would debut in theaters alongside Walt Disney Pictures' Cinderella on March 13, 2015. In late December, the co-directors told the Associated Press "There is something magic about these characters and this cast and this music. Hopefully, the audiences will enjoy the short we're doing, but we felt it again. It was really fun." Around the same time, Dave Metzger, who worked on the orchestration for Frozen, disclosed he was already at work on Frozen Fever.

In March 2015, the directors revealed that Walt Disney Animation Studios had brought up the possibility of creating a short film in April 2014. Buck and Lee were initially reluctant because they were still trying to determine why Frozen had been such a success, but agreed to start brainstorming possibilities. After early discussions about Olaf, head story artist Marc Smith pitched the idea of what might happen if Elsa had a cold, which became the basis for the short's plot. The directors began working on the short in June and by August were back in the recording studio with the cast to lay down vocal tracks.

The short features the song "Making Today a Perfect Day", by Anderson-Lopez and Lopez. At the premiere of Cinderella and Frozen Fever at the El Capitan Theatre in Hollywood, California, on March 1, 2015, Josh Gad told USA Today, "I want to apologize to parents everywhere for the fact that children are going to be singing a whole new Frozen song..." Gad's wife noticed he was still humming it two days after he recorded his lines.

== Composition ==
In "Making Today a Perfect Day" there is a lyrical reference to "Let It Go"—Elsa notes to Anna that "a cold never bothered me anyway", this time re-purposing the line by referring to an actual cold. Billboard suggests that the songwriting duo included this Easter egg because they "know exactly what the fanbase wanted".

The beginning of the song also includes a passage to the tune of Life's Too Short, one of the songs that were deleted from the film after the prophecy storyline and Elsa's role as a villain were dropped. The Los Angeles Times said that "dedicated Frozen fans" have pointed out similarities between the two songs. Robert Lopez said via Twitter: "To everyone who's noticed Life's Too Short in Frozen Fever, good ear. We wrote the lyric for the intro, and then realized it would fit the old tune, so we couldn't resist using it. It's our favorite cut song and the one we bled most for."

== Release ==
Though the short was only officially released alongside the 2015 film Cinderella, the audio was released online on March 12. The lyrics was posted by the official Disney blog on March 13, and the lyric video was released online on March 20.

The song is heavily advertised on the front cover of the Cinderella soundtrack CD.

The song was also sung by the cast of the Disney Channel show Best Friends Whenever.

== Critical reception ==
The song has received mixed to positive reviews. Though deemed a lesser effort than "Let It Go", it is still praised as being a competent catchy piece that adequately furthers the narrative of the short.

USA Today's Claudia Puig described the new song as "pleasant", and noted its potential as a song to be played at young girls' birthday parties, while noting it's not as catchy as the majority of the Frozen soundtrack. Natalie Jamieson, writing for Newsbeat, called the new song "catchy and fun", though stated that it is unlikely to emulate the "phenomenal success" of "Let It Go". Danny Walker of the Daily Mirror compared the catchiness of this "new favourite" to its predecessor "Let It Go", writing "everyone will be singing '[Making] Today a Perfect Day' once it hits the big screen"; he added it will make the former hit "a thing of the past". While noting that it isn't the same calibre of smash as "Let It Go", "upbeat", "peppy", and "catchy" were some of the words Billboard used to describe the number. PopSugar deemed the song "cute", "original", "happy" and "upbeat", and suggested it "borrows distinctively from 'Let It Go'". Music Times notes that the song has been released "just when you thought you got a break from Frozen tunes". Kat Brown of The Daily Telegraph referred to the short film as a "musical video", due to such a large proportion of it being taken up by this song. Us Weekly negatively compared its catchiness to "Let It Go", though described the ditty as "fresh", "bright", and "fun".

In a negative review, Slate felt that "the song itself, while hummable, is fatally damaged by its need to do too much."

== Charts ==
Chart (2015)	Peak position
Australia (ARIA)	80
U.S. Kid Digital Songs (Billboard)	1
