= Olaf Presents =

2021 comedy series

- Genre: Comedy
- Story by: Don Dougherty; Javier Ledesma; Hyrum Osmond
- Directed by: Hyrum Virl Osmond
- Voices of: Josh Gad; Frank Welker; Paul Briggs
- Country of origin: United States
- Original language: English
- No. of seasons: 1
- No. of episodes: 5

Production
- Executive producer: Jennifer Lee
- Producer: Jennifer Newfield
- Running time: 90 seconds
- Production company: Walt Disney Animation Studios

Original release
- Network: Disney+
- Release: November 12, 2021

Olaf Presents is an animated comedy miniseries of shorts that features Olaf (Josh Gad) retelling the stories of Disney films. The series was inspired by a scene in Frozen 2 where Olaf recaps Frozen. The series received positive responses, particularly for its humor.

== Premise ==
Olaf performs his own takes on Disney films The Little Mermaid, Moana, The Lion King, Aladdin and Tangled. He reenacts some things incorrectly and exaggerates certain elements. He plays most of the roles by himself, using various things to imitate the characters. At times, Sven, Marshmallow, (Note: An ice monster created by Elsa in Frozen) the Snowgies, (Note: Tiny snowmen inadvertently created by Elsa's sickness on Anna's birthday in Frozen Fever) Bruni, (Note: A salamander who is the fire spirit) and Gale (Note: A gust of wind who is the air spirit) help him with his performances.

== Cast ==
- Josh Gad as Olaf
- Frank Welker as Sven
- Paul Briggs as Marshmallow

== Production, marketing and release ==
During the production of Frozen 2, Disney needed a scene that was both amusing and informative, which would break up the narrative's occasional harsh tone and introduce a moment of sheer absurdity. They used Olaf and created a scene where he recites the events of Frozen. The scene became so popular that Walt Disney Animation Studios revived the concept for Olaf Presents. Gad improvised much of his performance in the series. The trailer featured the opening of The Lion King episode, followed by a series of Olaf Presents segments, each showing a different Disney film. Olaf appears as the Genie from Aladdin before moving on to Moana. Upon the trailer's release, CinemaBlend called it "Frozen meets Drunk History". The series was released on November 12, 2021, coinciding with Disney+ Day, on Disney+, with each episode at approximately 90 seconds.

== Episodes ==
All of the shorts were directed by Hyrum Virl Osmond.

Episodes of the first season of Olaf Presents
No.	Title	Original release date
1	"The Little Mermaid"	November 12, 2021
2	"Moana"	November 12, 2021
3	"The Lion King"	November 12, 2021
4	"Aladdin"	November 12, 2021
5	"Tangled"	November 12, 2021

== Reception ==
=== Critical response ===
Joel Keller of Decider found the series funny and entertaining across its humor, stating the show appears as a refreshing take on some of Disney's intellectual properties, and praised Josh Gad and Frank Welker for their performances. The Wrap writer Drew Taylor called it a "surprising celebration of Disney Animation's history" and "breakthrough in that it is clearly lampooning some aspects of cherished Disney classics, but in a way that is respectful and artistically ambitious". He commended Gad's performance and Olaf's humour, references, and how he could "disrupt" the Frozen world. Overall, he called it perfect, highlighting the animation and comedy. Shane Redding of Screen Rant praised Josh Gad's performance and the humor of the series, writing, "The series is a great use of Olaf's comedic abilities as he takes jabs at and points out the issues with some of Disney's most famous stories. Whether he is highlighting the painfulness of Mufasa's death in his version of The Lion King or singing "Part of Your World" as Ariel in a retelling of The Little Mermaid, Olaf hilariously brings some great Disney stories to life in a way that only he can." Diondra Brown of Common Sense Media rated the series 4 out of 5 stars and praised the humor of the series, while complimenting the depiction of different values, such as curiosity, perseverance, and teamwork, that are portrayed through the characters.

=== Accolades ===
Year	Award	Category	Nominee(s)	Result	Ref.
2022	Hollywood Critics Association TV Awards	Best Short Form Animation Series	Olaf Presents	Nominated	
2022	Children's and Family Emmy Awards	Outstanding Editing for an Animated Program	Jeff Draheim	Nominated	
