= Peter Del Vecho =

American film producer

- Born: April 6, 1958 (age 68); Quincy, Massachusetts, U.S.
- Education: Boston University
- Occupation: Film producer
- Employer: Walt Disney Animation Studios (1995-present)
- Known for: Treasure Planet; The Princess and the Frog; Frozen; Frozen 2
- Spouses: Jane Del Vecho (div. 2020); Paulina Vazquez (m. 2024)
- Children: 2
- Awards: Academy Award for Best Animated Feature; Frozen (2013)

Peter Del Vecho (born April 6, 1958) is an American film producer at Walt Disney Animation Studios, where he is also senior vice president of production. He is best known for producing Frozen and Frozen 2 together with directors Chris Buck and Jennifer Lee.

== Early life ==
Del Vecho grew up in the city of Quincy, in the South Shore area just outside Boston, Massachusetts. He graduated from Boston University College of Fine Arts, where he studied theater production, and worked in theatre for many years. After working at the Guthrie Theater in Minneapolis for about 7 years, he was recruited by Disney Animation. He started out in production management and transitioned into producing.

== Career ==
Besides Frozen and its sequel, Frozen II, Del Vecho produced the Disney animated films The Princess and the Frog (2009) and Winnie the Pooh (2011), and was an associate producer on Treasure Planet (2002) and Chicken Little (2005).

In Spring 2015, Del Vecho produced Frozen Fever, a short film based on Frozen which was again co-directed by Buck and Lee. Del Vecho next produced the sequel to Frozen, Frozen 2, which was released in November 2019 and again co-directed by Buck and Lee. Del Vecho later co-produced Raya and the Last Dragon with Osnat Shurer and co-produced Wish, which was released in 2023, with Juan Pablo Reyes Lancaster-Jones.

== Filmography ==
=== Films ===
==== As a producer ====
Year	Title	Notes
1997	Hercules	Production Manager
2005	Chicken Little	Associate Producer
2009	The Princess and the Frog	Producer
2011	Winnie the Pooh	Producer
2013	Frozen	Producer
2015	Frozen Fever	Short Film
2017	Olaf's Frozen Adventure	Short Film
2019	Frozen 2	Producer
2020	Once Upon a Snowman	Short Film
2021	Raya and the Last Dragon	Producer
2023	Wish	Producer
2026	The Royal Bond: Threads of Friendship	Producer; 2D Animation
2028	Clay	Producer
