= Get a Horse! =

2013 film by Lauren MacMullan

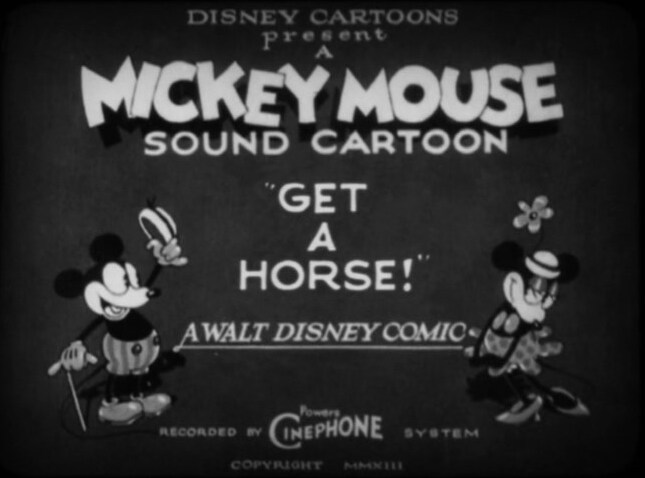
- Title card of the short
- Directed by: Lauren MacMullan
- Story by: Paul Briggs; Nancy Kruse; Lauren MacMullan; Raymond S. Persi
- Produced by: Dorothy McKim
- Starring: Walt Disney; Marcellite Garner; Russi Taylor; Billy Bletcher; Will Ryan
- Music by: Mark Watters
- Animation by: Eric Goldberg (lead); Adam Green (lead)
- Layouts by: Alfred "Tops" Cruz; Jean-Christophe Poulan
- Color process: Color; Black-and-white
- Production company: Walt Disney Animation Studios
- Distributed by: Walt Disney Studios; Motion Pictures
- Release dates: June 11, 2013 (Annecy); November 27, 2013 (with Frozen)
- Running time: 6 minutes
- Country: United States
- Language: English

Get a Horse! is a 2013 American animated comedy short film produced by Walt Disney Animation Studios and directed by Lauren MacMullan. Combining black-and-white hand-drawn animation and color computer animation, the short features the characters of the late 1920s Mickey Mouse cartoons.

The film features archival recordings of Walt Disney, Billy Bletcher and Marcellite Garner in their respective posthumous voice roles as Mickey Mouse, Peg Leg Pete and Minnie Mouse. Russi Taylor and Will Ryan provide some of Minnie's and Pete's lines (Mickey's final line "Goodbye, goodbye, little feller!" is an uncredited line by Jimmy MacDonald sourced from an archival recording. Disney's voice is also heard as Minnie in one instance crying out "Help! Help! Help! Help!", though he is uncredited in that role.)

It is the first original Mickey Mouse theatrical animated short since Runaway Brain in 1995, and the first appearance of Oswald the Lucky Rabbit in a Disney animated production, albeit for a split-second cameo. The short was nominated for Best Animated Short Film at the 86th Academy Awards.

== Plot ==
Mickey Mouse walks from his house and spots Horace Horsecollar pulling a hay wagon with all his friends playing music. He hops on and helps Minnie Mouse and Clarabelle Cow onto the wagon. Just then, Peg-Leg Pete shows up in his jalopy, spots Minnie, and gives her a flirty gaze, only for Mickey to put Clarabelle in Minnie's place. Angry at being pranked, Pete kidnaps Minnie and rams his car into the wagon, sending Mickey and Horace flying toward the screen and causing them to burst from their two-dimensional, black-and-white world to the three-dimensional, modern movie theater in full color.

As Mickey tries to return to his world, Horace walks onto the stage carrying (and wearing) items, such as an iPhone, a Captain America t-shirt, a pair of modern sunglasses and a box of Milk Duds. Mickey uses Horace as a mock biplane to fly around the theater and fire at Pete with the Milk Duds like bullets. When they crash-land onto the stage, Mickey sees the iPhone and uses it to call Pete on his candlestick phone, and Horace sprays foam from a fire extinguisher into the phone and out of Pete's after he answers it.

Pete's car then lands in a frozen lake, and the screen fills with water, giving Mickey the idea to poke a hole in the screen with his tail and let the water leak out, causing Pete, Minnie, and the other cartoon animals to flood onto the stage. Mickey and Minnie's reunion is short-lived, as Pete chases the gang in and out of the screen until he grabs Minnie again, hits Mickey onto a support beam, and nails the screen shut.

Horace and the others try to break through the screen, but flip it upside-down, causing Pete to fall from the ground. Getting an idea, Minnie encourages Mickey to flip the screen again, which sets off a chain of further misfortunes until Pete is launched face-first into his car. Then, Horace's hand gets stuck behind the screen. Mickey tries to pull him out, but only succeeds in spinning the screen like a flip book, which rewinds the scene. Seeing this as an opportunity, Mickey and Horace begin spinning the screen until Pete is completely dazed and knocked out.

Minnie then drives Pete's car with Pete in tow and completely tears the screen down, revealing the black-and-white world into color and CGI. With Pete still knocked out, Mickey and his friends enter their world again while Pete's car horn tells him to get a horse and Mickey and Minnie kiss Horace on the cheeks while he blushes. As the iris closes, Pete, who has woken up by now, tries to get back in through the screen but gets his head (and body) stuck. Seconds later, the flap on Pete's pants opens up to reveal the phrase "THE END" on his posterior, which he furiously bellows "Hey!!" in frustration.

After the credits, Clarabelle jumps over the old black-and-white version of the 2006-2022 Walt Disney Pictures castle, making the arch with her milk.

== Cast ==
- Walt Disney and Jimmy MacDonald as Mickey Mouse
- Walt Disney, Marcellite Garner, and Russi Taylor as Minnie Mouse
- Billy Bletcher and Will Ryan as Peg Leg Pete
- Raymond S. Persi as Car Horn

Additional voices

- Bob Bergen
- Paul Briggs
- Jess Harnell
- Mona Marshall
- Terri Douglas
- Danya Joseph
- Nicole Mitchell

=== Films used ===
- Mr. Mouse Takes a Trip (1940)
- Mickey and the Seal (1948)

== Production ==
Get a Horse! was conceived and directed by Lauren MacMullan, who became the first woman to solo direct a Disney animated film. She started working on the short after Wreck-It Ralph director, Rich Moore, told her that Disney was looking for some Mickey Mouse ideas for television. Being fond of the earliest Mickey Mouse shorts, mostly because of their simplicity and freshness, she opted for a style resembling the 1920s "rubber hose" animation style prevalent at the time. Produced in a year and 6 months, its hand-drawn animation was supervised by Eric Goldberg, and its computer animation by Adam Green. To achieve the 1928 look, aging and blur filters were added to the image, while for the CGI part, they created new models, faithful to the character designs of 1928. The look of Pete's clothing and car were inspired by his design in the 1929 short The Barn Dance.

Originally temporary scratch vocals, the production team incorporated archival recordings of Walt Disney's Mickey Mouse voice from 1928 to 1947, and spliced it into the character's dialogue. However, they did not find recordings of the word "red", so the crew took three sounds, an "rrr", an "ehh", and a "duh" from Disney's recordings and spliced them together.

Get a Horse! would become the last theatrical short film where Minnie Mouse would be voiced by Russi Taylor, almost six years before her death in 2019.

== Release ==
Get a Horse! premiered June 11, 2013, at the Annecy International Animated Film Festival in Annecy, France. It made its United States premiere on August 9, 2013, at the D23 Expo in Anaheim, California, and theatrically accompanied Walt Disney Animation Studios' Frozen, which was released on November 27, 2013.

Since 2016, Get a Horse! is presented as part of the Disney-Pixar Short Film Festival attraction at Disney's Epcot theme park in Orlando, Florida, where it is shown in digital 3-D along with two Pixar short films. It is also part of the Walt Disney Animation Studios’ Short Film Collection.

=== Home media ===
Get a Horse! made its home debut on the Blu-ray 3D, Blu-ray and DVD releases of Frozen on March 18, 2014. It was later released on the Walt Disney Animation Studios Short Films Collection Blu-ray on August 18, 2015. The short was re-released on Blu-ray/DVD/Digital on the Celebrating Mickey compilation, released October 23, 2018. Celebrating Mickey was reissued in 2021 as part of the U.S. Disney Movie Club exclusive The Best of Mickey Collection along with Fantasia and Fantasia 2000 (Blu-ray/DVD/Digital).

=== Streaming ===
Get a Horse! was available on Netflix in North America on October 25, 2015, released in the Walt Disney Animation Studios Short Films Collection, which also included Frozen Fever and Paperman, as one film title on the service. The title was removed from Netflix on October 25, 2021, six years after it was added.

The short film, and most of the others that were released on Netflix, were made available to stream individually, rather than one single collection, on Disney+ on November 12, 2021, for the first Disney+ Day.

== Reception ==
=== Critical response ===
Todd McCarthy of The Hollywood Reporter lauded the short film as "one of the wittiest and most inventive animated shorts in a long time". He particularly points out that the film "begins as an early black-and-white Mickey Mouse cartoon but then bursts its boundaries into color and 3D in marvelously antic ways that call to mind the stepping-off-the-screen techniques of Buster Keaton's Sherlock Jr. and Woody Allen's The Purple Rose of Cairo. It's a total winner." Scott Foundas of Variety agreed, labeling the film as "utterly dazzling". Drew McWeeny of HitFix lauded it as "the perfect companion piece" and "enormously entertaining". He continues on that "Filmmaker Lauren MacMullan perfectly nails the look and feel of the early days of the Disney studio, and it is the first time I have ever laughed out loud at Mickey Mouse. It's an inventive and technically precise short, and it also celebrates and deconstructs Disney's animated history in a very fun way."

=== Accolades ===
Accolades for Get a Horse!
Award	Date of ceremony	Category	Recipients	Result
Academy Awards	March 2, 2014	Best Animated Short Film	Lauren MacMullan & Dorothy McKim	Nominated
Annie Awards	February 1, 2014	Best Animated Short Subject	Lauren MacMullan	Won
San Diego Film Critics Society	December 11, 2013	Best Animated Film	Get a Horse!	Nominated

== See also ==
- List of Mickey Mouse films and appearances
- Sound collage
- Sampling
