= Chris Buck =

American filmmaker (born 1958)

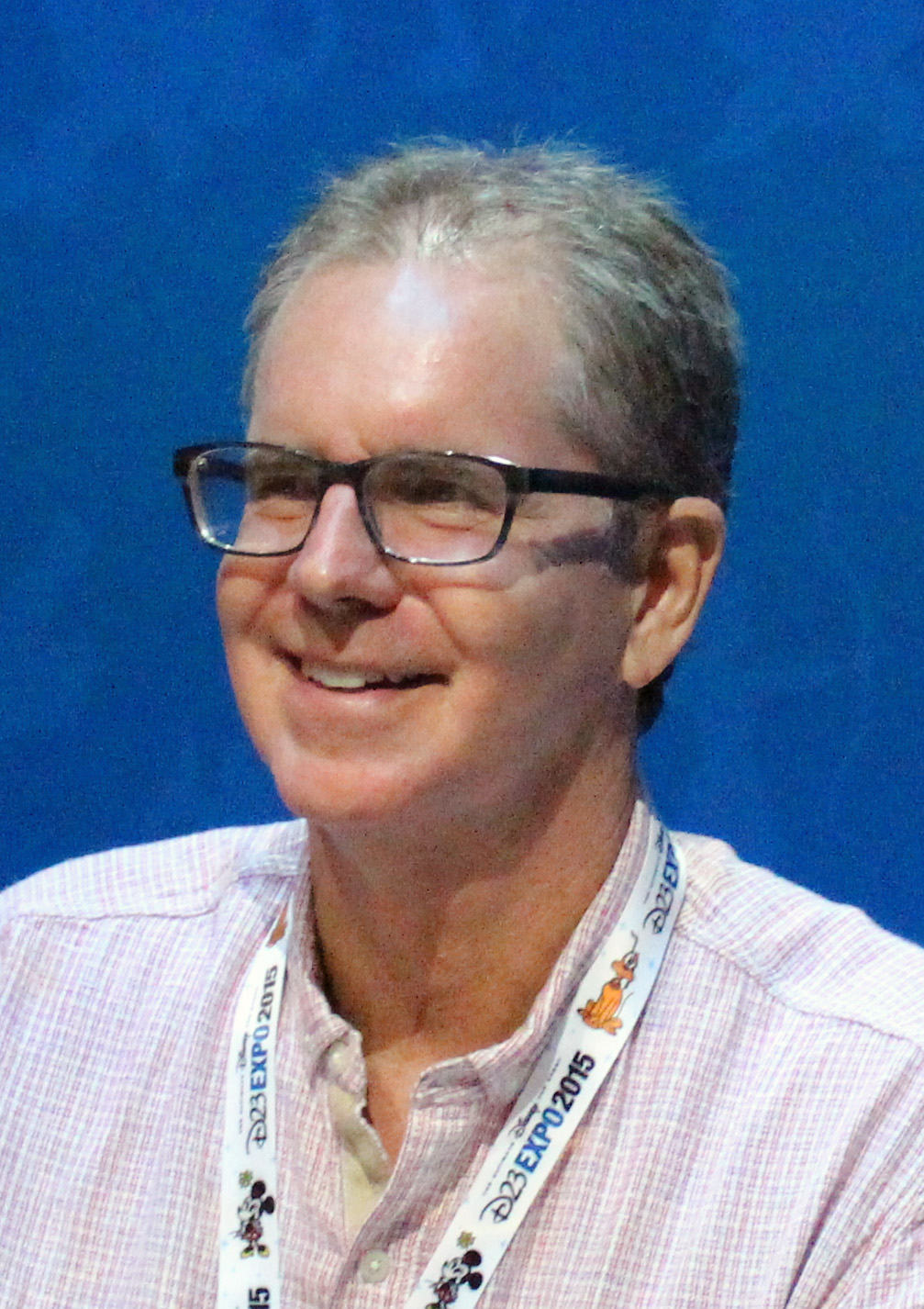
- Buck in 2015
- Born: Christopher James Buck; February 24, 1958 (age 68); Wichita, Kansas, U.S.
- Education: California Institute of the Arts
- Occupations: Director; animator; screenwriter
- Years active: 1978–present
- Employers: Walt Disney Animation Studios (1978–2004; 2008–present); Sony Pictures Animation (2004–2008)
- Notable work: Tarzan; Surf's Up; Frozen; Frozen Fever; Frozen II; Wish
- Spouse: Shelley Rae Hinton (m. 1989)
- Children: 3
- Awards: Academy Award; Annie Award; BAFTA Award

Christopher James Buck (born February 24, 1958) is an American film director, animator, and screenwriter known for co-directing Tarzan (1999), Surf's Up (2007) (which was nominated for the 2007 Oscar for Best Animated Feature), Frozen (2013; which won the Oscar for Best Animated Feature in 2014), Frozen II (2019), and Wish (2023). He also worked as a supervising animator and story artist on Pocahontas (1995) and Home on the Range (2004).

He has won an Academy Award, Annie Award, and BAFTA Award, and additionally has been nominated for two Academy, two BAFTA, and five Annie Awards.

== Life and career ==
A native of Wichita, Kansas, Buck was inspired to explore animation by the first film he ever saw in a movie theatre as a child: Pinocchio (1940). His family eventually moved to Placentia, California, where he graduated from El Dorado High School.

Buck studied character animation for two years at CalArts, where he also taught from 1988 to 1993. At CalArts, Buck became friends with both John Lasseter and Michael Giaimo. He began his career as an animator with Disney in 1978.

Besides his work as a co-director on Tarzan, Buck's other credits at Disney also include the 1995 animated feature Pocahontas, where he oversaw the animation of three central characters: Percy, Grandmother Willow, and Wiggins. Buck also helped design characters for the 1989 animated feature The Little Mermaid, performed experimental animation for The Rescuers Down Under (1990) and Who Framed Roger Rabbit (1988), and was an animator on The Fox and the Hound (1981) and The Black Cauldron (1985).

Buck helped develop several films at Hyperion Pictures and served as a directing animator on the feature Bebe's Kids. He storyboarded Tim Burton's live-action featurette Frankenweenie (1984) and worked with Burton again as directing animator on the Brad Bird-directed Family Dog episode of Steven Spielberg's Amazing Stories and as director of the subsequent primetime animated series.

Buck's credits include a number of animated commercials (including some with the Keebler Elves) for such Los Angeles–based production entities as FilmFair, Kurtz & Friends, and Duck Soup.

Buck went on to co-direct Surf's Up at Sony Pictures Animation, which was released in June 2007.

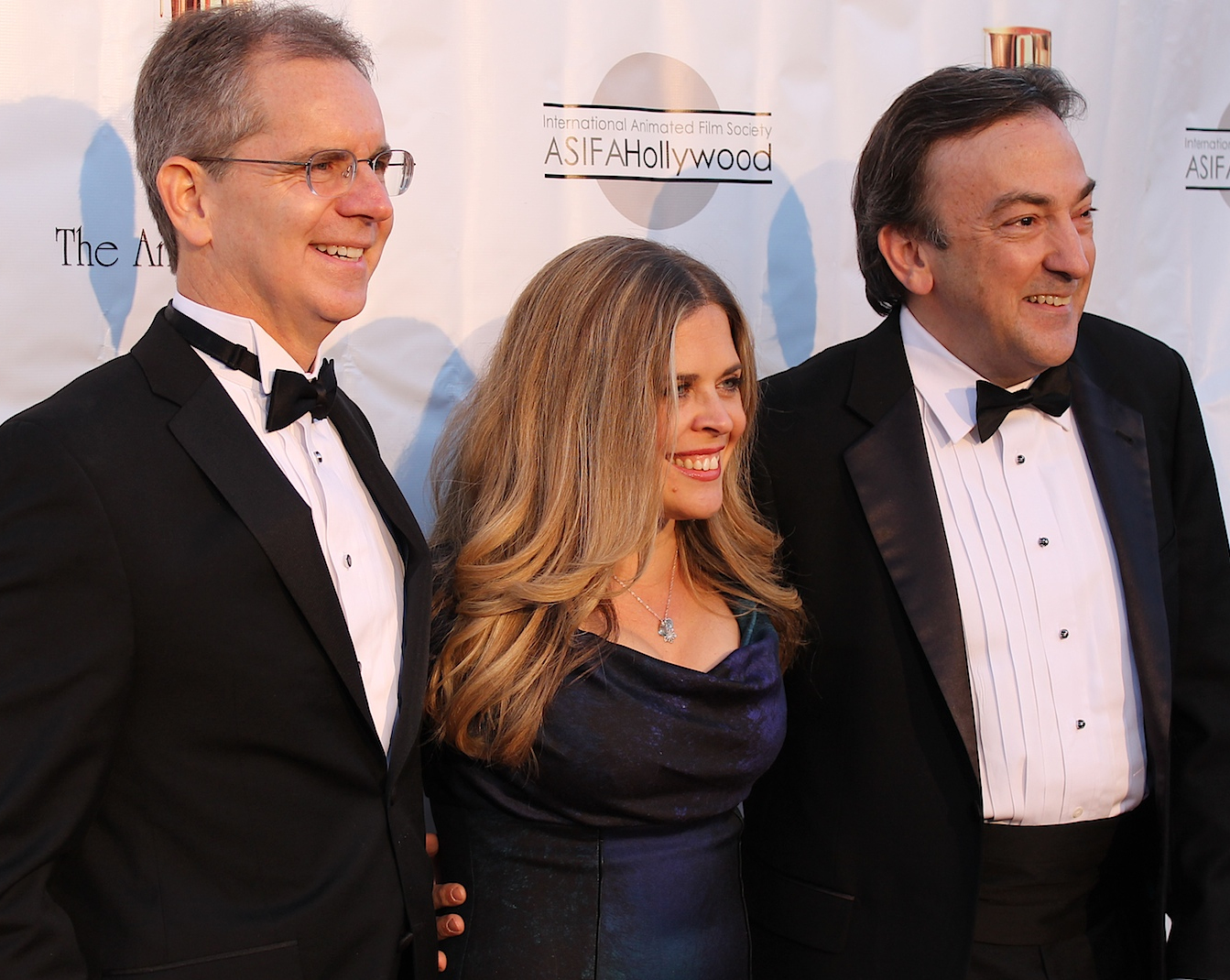
Buck with Frozen co-director Jennifer Lee and producer Peter Del Vecho

In 2008, Buck's old friend Lasseter, by then Disney Animation's chief creative officer, persuaded him to come back to Disney from Sony. Around September 2008, Buck pitched three ideas to Lasseter, one of which was a fairytale musical version of The Snow Queen; Lasseter liked the idea and authorized Buck to proceed with development. After it was put on hold during 2010, the film was officially announced in December 2011 under the title Frozen, with a release date of November 27, 2013. In turn, Buck persuaded Giaimo to come back to Disney to serve as the film's art director, for which Giaimo would go on to win the Annie Award for Best Production Design in an Animated Feature Production.

In September 2014, it was announced that Buck and Lee would co-direct a short film based on the Frozen characters called Frozen Fever. It was released in March 2015, alongside Cinderella.

On March 12, 2015, Disney announced that Buck and Lee would co-direct Frozen II, the sequel to Frozen. It was released in November 2019.

Buck directed Wish, which was released in November 2023.

== Personal life ==
Buck is married to Shelley Rae Hinton Buck, an Emmy and Oscar Award winner in sound editing. They had three sons, Ryder, Woody, and Reed.

Their oldest son, Ryder, died at age 23 on October 27, 2013, in a car collision, when he was hit by two cars after his car broke down on the Glendale Freeway just one month before Frozen was released. Ryder was a singer and songwriter performing in his band Ryder Buck and the Breakers, and was recovering from a year-long battle with a Stage 4 testicular cancer. On March 2, 2014, upon accepting the Academy Award for Best Animated Feature for co-directing Frozen at the 86th Academy Awards, Buck dedicated the award to his son Ryder. The tragedy was an inspiration for the song "The Next Right Thing" in Frozen II, as well as a character named "Ryder."

Reed lent his voice to Arnold, a little penguin from Surf's Up, directed by his father.

== Filmography ==
=== Feature films ===
Year	Film	Credited As						
Year	Film	Director	Writer	Animator	Character Designer	Visual Development	Other	Notes
1981	The Fox and the Hound	No	No	Character	No	No	No	
1985	The Black Cauldron	No	No	Yes	No	No	No	(Uncredited)
1987	The Brave Little Toaster	No	No	No	Yes	No	No	
1988	Oliver & Company	No	No	Yes	No	No	No	
1989	The Little Mermaid	No	No	No	Yes	No	No	
1990	The Rescuers Down Under	No	No	No	Yes	Yes	No	
1992	Bebe's Kids	No	No	No	No	No	Yes	Animation Director
1995	Pocahontas	No	Story	Supervising	Yes	Yes	No	Storyboard Artist / Supervising Animator: Percy/Grandmother Willow/Wiggins
1999	Tarzan	Yes	No	No	No	No	No	
2004	Home on the Range	No	No	Supervising	No	No	No	Supervising Animator: Maggie
2004	Mickey's Twice Upon a Christmas	No	No	No	No	No	Yes	Animation Consultant; Direct-To-Video
2006	Open Season	No	No	No	No	No	Yes	Special Thanks
2007	Surf's Up	Yes	Yes	No	No	No	Yes	Voice of Filmmaker #2
2013	Frozen	Yes	Story	No	No	No	No	
2014	Big Hero 6	No	No	No	No	No	Yes	Creative Leadership
2016	Zootopia	No	No	No	No	No	Yes	Creative Leadership
2016	Moana	No	No	No	No	No	Yes	Creative Leadership
2018	Ralph Breaks the Internet	No	No	No	No	No	Yes	Creative Leadership
2019	Frozen 2	Yes	Story	No	No	No	Yes	Creative Leadership
2021	Raya and the Last Dragon	No	No	No	No	No	Yes	Creative Leadership
2021	Encanto	No	No	No	No	No	Yes	Creative Leadership
2022	Strange World	No	No	No	No	No	Yes	Creative Leadership
2023	Wish	Yes	Story	No	No	No	Yes	Creative Leadership
2025	Zootopia 2	No	No	No	No	No	Yes	Creative Leadership (uncredited)

==== Short films ====
Year	Film	Credited As				
Year	Film	Director	Writer	Animator	Other	Notes
1979	Doctor of Doom	No	No	No	Yes	Voice of Pepe
1982	Fun with Mr. Future	No	No	Yes	No	
1984	Frankenweenie	No	No	No	Yes	Special Thanks
1987	Sport Goofy in Soccermania	No	No	Supervising	No	
1988	Winter	No	No	No	Yes	Special Thanks
1988	The Thing What Lurked in the Tub	No	No	No	Yes	Special Thanks
1989	Palm Springs	No	No	No	Yes	Special Thanks
1990	Next Door	No	No	No	Yes	Special Thanks
1991	Box-Office Bunny	No	No	Key	No	
2010	Not Your Time	No	No	Yes	Yes	Himself
2015	Frozen Fever	Yes	Story	No	No	
2017	Olaf's Frozen Adventure	No	No	No	Yes	Special Thanks
2018	A Bug in the Room	No	No	No	Yes	Special Thanks
2020	Once Upon a Snowman	No	No	No	Yes	Creative Consultant

==== Television ====
Year	Title	Credited As			
Year	Title	Director	Animation Department	Character Designer	Notes
1987	Amazing Stories	No	Supervising	No	Animation Supervisor - 1 Episode
1990	Bill & Ted's Excellent Adventures	No	No	Yes	Character Designer - 13 Episodes
1993	Family Dog	Yes	No	No	Series Director
1996	Quack Pack	No	No	Yes	Character Designer - 1 Episode

==== Documentaries ====
Year	Title	Role
2014	The Story of Frozen: Making a Disney Animated Classic	Himself
2020	Into the Unknown: Making Frozen II	Himself; Special Thanks

== Accolades ==
Year	Award	Category	Work	Result	Reference
1995	Annie Awards	Best Individual Achievement for Animation	Pocahontas	Nominated	
1999	Annie Awards	Outstanding Individual Achievement for Directing in an Animated Feature Production	Tarzan	Nominated	
2000	Sierra Award	Best Animated Film	Tarzan	Nominated	
2008	Academy Awards	Best Animated Feature	Surf's Up	Nominated	
2008	Annie Awards	Best Directing in an Animated Feature Production	Surf's Up	Nominated	
2008	Annie Awards	Best Writing in an Animated Feature Production	Surf's Up	Nominated	
2013	EDA Award	Best Animated Feature Film	Frozen	Nominated	
2013	AFCA Award	Best Animated Film	Frozen	Won	
2013	Dubai International Film Festival	People's Choice Award	Frozen	Won	
2013	SLFCA Award	Best Animated Film	Frozen	Won	
2014	Academy Awards	Academy Award for Best Animated Feature	Frozen	Won	
2014	BAFTA Film Award	Best Animated Featured Film	Frozen	Won	
2014	BAFTA Children's Award	BAFTA Kids Vote - Feature Film	Frozen	Won	
2014	BAFTA Children's Award	Best Feature Film	Frozen	Nominated	
2014	Annie Awards	Outstanding Achievement in Directing in an Animated Feature Production	Frozen	Won	
2014	Gold Derby Award	Animated Feature	Frozen	Won	
2014	Hugo Awards	Best Dramatic Presentation - Long Form	Frozen	Nominated	
2014	International Online Cinema Awards (INOCA)	Best Animated Feature	Frozen	Won	
2014	Italian Online Movie Awards (IOMA)	Best Animated Feature Film (Miglior film d'animazione)	Frozen	Nominated	
2014	Seattle Film Critics Award	Best Animated Feature	Frozen	Won	
2014	VES Award	Outstanding Animation in an Animated Feature Motion Picture	Frozen	Won	
2015	Tokyo Anime Award	Grand Prize, Feature Film	Frozen	Won	
2019	Seattle Film Critics Award	Best Animated Feature	Frozen II	Nominated	
2020	BAFTA Film Award	Best Animated Featured Film	Frozen II	Nominated	
2020	Annie Awards	Outstanding Achievement for Directing in an Animated Feature Production	Frozen II	Nominated	
2020	Golden Globe award	Best Animated Feature Film	Frozen II	Nominated	
2020	LEJA Award	Best Animated Feature	Frozen II	Nominated	
2020	OFTA Film Award	Best Animated Picture	Frozen II	Nominated	
