= Frozen 3 =

Upcoming Walt Disney Animation Studios film

- Official logo
- Directed by: Jennifer Lee
- Written by: Jennifer Lee
- Starring: Kristen Bell; Idina Menzel; Josh Gad; Jonathan Groff
- Production company: Walt Disney Animation Studios
- Distributed by: Walt Disney Studios; Motion Pictures (Note: Distributed by Walt Disney Studios Motion Pictures through the Walt Disney Pictures banner.)
- Release date: November 24, 2027
- Country: United States
- Language: English

Frozen 3 (stylized as Frozen III) is an upcoming American animated musical fantasy film written and directed by Jennifer Lee. Produced by Walt Disney Animation Studios, it is the third feature film in the Frozen franchise, following Frozen II. Kristen Bell, Idina Menzel, Josh Gad, and Jonathan Groff will reprise their roles from the previous films. In the film, Anna and Kristoff's wedding will be seen, Anna will join Elsa on a new journey, and the royal family will welcome a new member.

Development on a third Frozen film was announced by Disney CEO Bob Iger in February 2023, though Lee initially stated in June that she would not return to direct. Lee eventually decided to write and direct the film in September 2024, with most of the returning cast being announced in November 2025.

Frozen 3 is scheduled to be theatrically released in the United States on November 24, 2027.

== Voice cast ==
- Kristen Bell as Anna
- Idina Menzel as Elsa
- Josh Gad as Olaf
- Jonathan Groff as Kristoff

== Production ==
In February 2023, during the Q1 earnings call, Disney CEO Bob Iger announced that a sequel to Frozen 2 (2019) was in active development. Shortly thereafter, MovieWeb exclusively reported that Josh Gad would return as the voice of Olaf in the film. In June of the same year, Jennifer Lee revealed that she would not be returning to direct. At the D23 convention in August 2024, Lee showed the first look concept art of the film. The following month, it was revealed that Lee would be directing the film after all, with her stepping down as Chief Creative Officer for Walt Disney Animation Studios. In November 2025, Gad was officially confirmed to be reprising his role, alongside Idina Menzel and Kristen Bell, while Once Upon a Studio (2023) director Trent Correy signed on as the film's co-director. In February 2026, Gad began voice recording for the film.

== Marketing ==
In an interview with License Global in February 2026, Paul Glitter, the executive vice president of global brand commercialization at Disney Consumer Products, revealed that a new Frozen short film would be released in October. He elaborated by saying, "we're excited to kick off the countdown to Frozen 3 with a new short this October, ahead of our biggest ever cross-company movie marketing campaign in 2027."

Footage from Frozen 3 was shown at the D23 fan event in August 2026.

== Release ==
Frozen 3 is scheduled to be theatrically released in the United States by Walt Disney Pictures on November 24, 2027.

== Sequel ==
In November 2023, Disney CEO Bob Iger announced that a fourth Frozen film was in active development. At the 2024 D23 convention, Jennifer Lee confirmed that a fourth film was being planned. The film was officially confirmed the following month with Lee and Marc Smith set to write the script.
