= Frozen Fever =

2015 American animated short film

- Film poster
- Directed by: Chris Buck; Jennifer Lee
- Story by: Chris Buck; Jennifer Lee; Marc E. Smith
- Produced by: Peter Del Vecho; Aimee Scribner
- Starring: Kristen Bell; Idina Menzel; Jonathan Groff; Josh Gad
- Edited by: Jeff Draheim
- Music by: Christophe Beck
- Production companies: Walt Disney Animation Studios; Walt Disney Pictures
- Distributed by: Walt Disney Studios Motion Pictures
- Release date: March 13, 2015 (with Cinderella)
- Running time: 7 minutes
- Country: United States
- Language: English

Frozen Fever is a 2015 American animated musical fantasy short film produced by Walt Disney Animation Studios and released by Walt Disney Pictures. A follow-up to the 2013 feature film Frozen, the short follows Elsa as she attempts to throw a surprise party for her sister Anna with the help of Kristoff, Sven, and Olaf. Chris Buck and Jennifer Lee again served as the directors with Kristen Bell, Idina Menzel, Jonathan Groff, and Josh Gad reprising their roles from the film and Christophe Beck composing the score.

Production on Frozen Fever began in June 2014 and took six months to complete. The film debuted in theaters alongside Walt Disney Pictures' live-action remake of Cinderella on March 13, 2015. It received positive reviews from critics, along with praise for its original song "Making Today a Perfect Day" by Kristen Anderson-Lopez and Robert Lopez.

== Plot ==
One year after the events of Frozen, Queen Elsa is determined to give her younger sister, Anna, a perfect surprise birthday party and enlists the help of Kristoff, his reindeer Sven and the lovable snowman Olaf in order to make sure the party goes ahead without any problems.

Anna is led on a party treasure hunt created by Elsa, following a piece of string that leads to different gifts. The day starts fine but Elsa suddenly starts developing symptoms of a cold. With each sneeze, Elsa unknowingly produces a group of "Snowgies", little snow-babies who begin to dismantle the birthday party's decorations while Kristoff and Sven try to stop them and Olaf embraces them.

Elsa brushes away Anna's growing concern regarding her constant sneezing, assuring her she "[does not] get colds" and enthusiastically continuing the treasure hunt. Meanwhile, Anna is visibly struggling under the weight of all the extravagant presents she has found from the hunt and Elsa's condition is rapidly worsening. Anna recognises her sister is delirious with a fever as they climb the clock tower to Elsa's final present, two figures of the sisters as part of the hourly clocktower procession. Now completely delirious and wobbly, Elsa starts teetering dangerously close to the edge of the platform, before falling. Anna races forward and grabs her sister's wrist, pulling her back to safety. Reluctantly, Elsa admits she is suffering from a cold and that she needs to go home and rest in bed.

They walk back to the castle where Elsa apologizes to Anna for "ruining" another birthday, but Anna reassures her that she did not ruin anything, despite having a fever. As Anna goes to lead Elsa to bed, the doors to the castle open to reveal Kristoff, Olaf, Sven, and a mountain of Snowgies, who surprise Anna. Elsa sneezes again and finally notices the little snow-people she has been inadvertently creating all day. The cake is served and everyone celebrates Princess Anna's birthday. Despite her sister's protests, Elsa concludes the party by blowing into an alphorn, but she sneezes into the horn, forming a giant snowball that inadvertently and accidentally hits Hans overseas into a cart of manure, as he was cleaning out the stables.

Elsa rests in bed under Anna's care while she points out that taking care of her beloved big sister is the best birthday present she could have been given. Olaf, Kristoff, and Sven escort the Snowgies to Elsa's former ice palace, where they stay with the palace's snow-giant doorkeeper and current owner Marshmallow.

== Cast ==
- Kristen Bell as Anna
- Idina Menzel as Elsa
- Jonathan Groff as Kristoff
- Josh Gad as Olaf
- Chris Williams as Oaken
- Santino Fontana as Hans
- Paul Briggs as Marshmallow

== Production ==
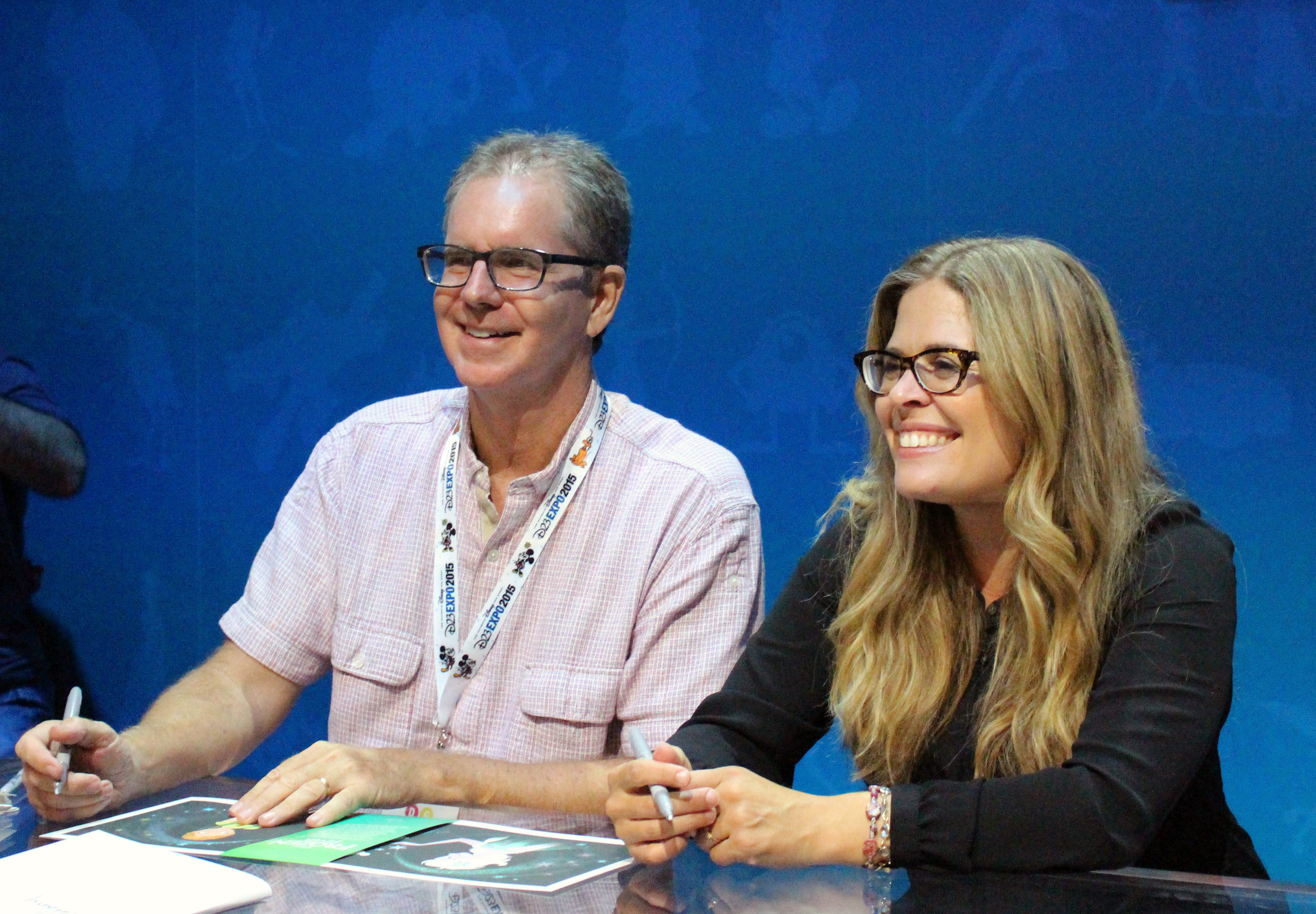
Frozen Fever's directors, Chris Buck and Jennifer Lee

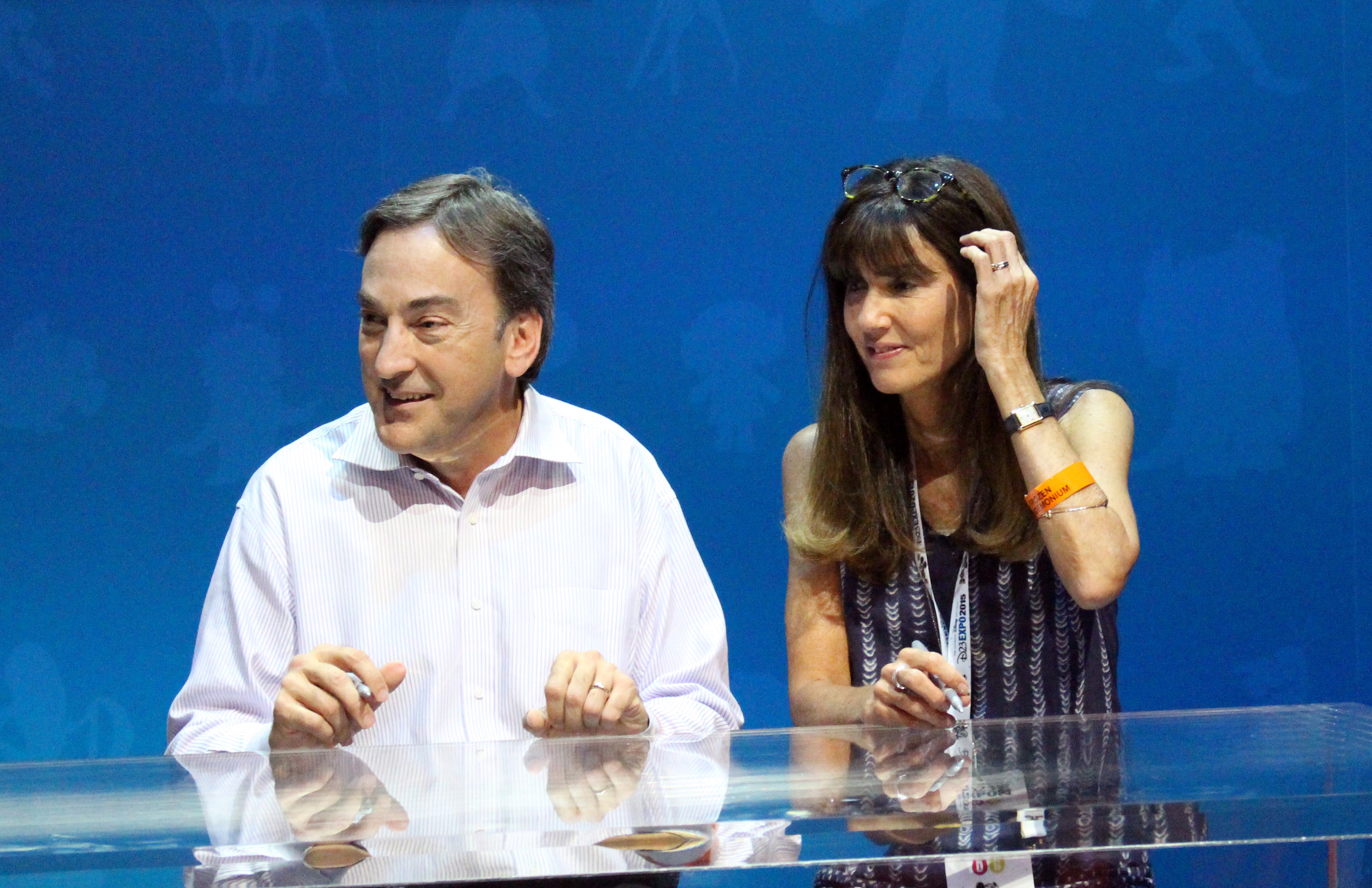
Frozen Fever's producers, Peter Del Vecho and Aimee Scribner

Both photos were taken at the 2015 D23 Expo in Anaheim, California.

On September 2, 2014, during the ABC airing of The Story of Frozen: Making a Disney Animated Classic, Walt Disney Animation Studios' then-chief creative officer John Lasseter announced that a Frozen short film with a new song would be released in the future. On the same day, Variety announced that the short would be released in early 2015 under the title Frozen Fever, with Chris Buck and Jennifer Lee returning as co-directors, Peter Del Vecho returning as producer and a new song by Kristen Anderson-Lopez and Robert Lopez. Olaf the snowman would also make an appearance in the short. On December 3, 2014, it was announced that Aimee Scribner would be a co-producer and that Frozen Fever would debut in theaters alongside Walt Disney Pictures' Cinderella on March 13, 2015. In late December, the co-directors told the Associated Press "There is something magic about these characters and this cast and this music. Hopefully, the audiences will enjoy the short we're doing, but we felt it again. It was really fun." Around the same time, Dave Metzger, who worked on the orchestration for Frozen, disclosed he was already at work on Frozen Fever.

The short features the song "Making Today a Perfect Day", by Anderson-Lopez and Lopez. At the premiere of Cinderella and Frozen Fever at the El Capitan Theatre in Hollywood, California, on March 1, 2015, Josh Gad told USA Today, "I want to apologize to parents everywhere for the fact that children are going to be singing a whole new Frozen song[.]"

The creators started brainstorming possibilities for the short film in June 2014. After early discussions about Olaf, head story artist Marc Smith pitched the idea of what might happen if Elsa had a cold, which became the basis for the short's plot. The directors began working on the short in June and by August were back in the recording studio with the cast to lay down vocal tracks. The production of Frozen Fever took six months. All of the animators from Frozen wanted to come back to animate at least one shot on Frozen Fever, resulting in a large number of animator credits for a short film. They struggled to squeeze the animation phase of the short's production into a tight time slot in fall 2014 after animation wrapped on Big Hero 6 and before the studio's animators had to start working on subsequent features. It was during this time period that the directors began to realize how much they missed the Frozen characters; they began to discuss the ideas that evolved into a full-length sequel, Frozen 2 (2019).

== Release ==
=== Theaters and home video ===
Frozen Fever premiered in theaters alongside Walt Disney Pictures' Cinderella on March 13, 2015. It was released on Digital HD and Disney Movies Anywhere on August 11, 2015, and was released on the Walt Disney Animation Studios Short Films Collection DVD/Blu-ray Combo Pack on August 18, 2015. It was also included on the Blu-ray, DVD, and Digital HD releases of Cinderella on September 15, 2015. On November 9, 2015, it was released on an exclusive DVD copy of its own, courtesy of Tesco stores across the UK.

=== Streaming ===
Frozen Fever was available on Netflix in North America on October 25, 2015, released in the Walt Disney Animation Studios Short Films Collection, which also included Get a Horse! and Paperman, as one film title on the service. The title was removed from Netflix on October 25, 2021, six years after it was added.

The short film, and most of the others that were released on Netflix, were made available to stream individually, rather than one single collection, on Disney+ on November 12, 2021 for the first Disney+ Day.

== Reception ==
USA Today's Claudia Puig rated the short three stars out of four, and described the new song ("Making Today a Perfect Day") as "pleasant". She concluded that although the short "is not as exhilarating and inventive as the original, it's still a treat to see an abridged tale of these two sisters in a warmhearted spinoff." Writing for BBC, Natalie Jamieson called the new song "catchy and fun". Dan Kois of the Slate called the film "a real bummer, the first recent misfire from Disney's shorts program, and thus the first serious misfire from the Lasseter-led Disney." The Daily Telegraph's Robbie Collin praised the song "Making Today a Perfect Day", stating that "it's a lip-smacking confection, dusted with pure icing sugar, and suggests that songwriters Kristen Anderson-Lopez and Robert Lopez are capable of coming up with something special for the forthcoming feature-length Frozen sequel."

CraveOnline's Witney Seibold wrote that the film "is a celebration of the very kind of conspicuous consumerism that Disney is always smearing the landscape with." Mike Scott of The Times-Picayune wrote that "with its blend of sweetness, silliness and tunefulness, this animated Disney short is satisfyingly consistent in vision and in spirit with the original Frozen."
