= The Story of Frozen: Making a Disney Animated Classic =

2014 US television special

- Written by: Jeanmarie Condon; Megan Harding; Victoria Thompson
- Directed by: Rudy Bednar
- Narrated by: Josh Gad
- Country of origin: United States
- Original language: English

Production
- Producer: Cole Kazdin
- Cinematography: Tristan Milani
- Editors: Paulo Bolivar; Sean Borjes; Karl Dawson; Jai De Leon; Ming Xue
- Running time: 44 minutes
- Production company: Lincoln Square Productions

Original release
- Network: ABC
- Release: September 4, 2014

The Story of Frozen: Making a Disney Animated Classic is a television special that aired September 2, 2014, on ABC. The program details the creation process of Walt Disney Animation Studios' 2013 animated musical film Frozen, and the film's cultural impact.

== Overview ==
On August 13, 2014, it was announced that the one-hour television special, titled The Story of Frozen: Making a Disney Animated Classic, would air September 2, 2014, on ABC. It features interviews with some of the cast and the creative team of the film; footage from Norway that inspired the look of Frozen; announcements of what is planned for the Frozen franchise; a preview of Anna, Elsa, and Kristoff's appearances in the fourth season of the TV series Once Upon a Time; and a sneak peek of Walt Disney Animation Studios' film Big Hero 6. The special also announced Frozen Fever, an animated short film serving as a sequel to Frozen, which was released alongside the live-action Walt Disney Pictures film Cinderella on March 13, 2015.
