= Jennifer Lee (filmmaker) =

American filmmaker (born 1971)

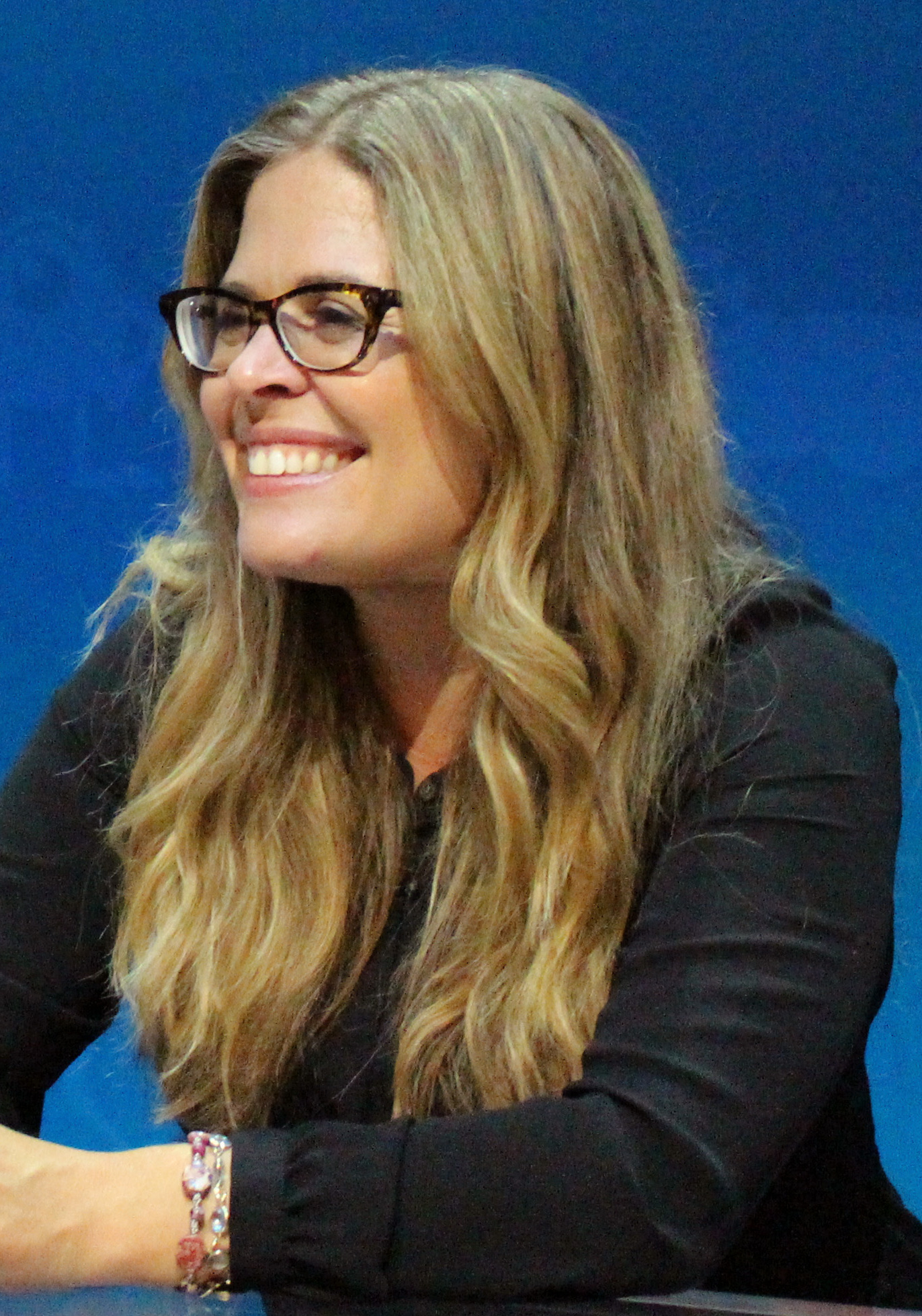
- Lee in 2015
- Born: Jennifer Michelle Rebecchi; October 22, 1971 (age 55); Providence, Rhode Island, U.S.
- Education: University of New Hampshire (BA); Columbia University (MFA)
- Occupations: Screenwriter; film director; film producer; playwright
- Years active: 2004–present
- Employer: Walt Disney Animation Studios (2011–present)
- Spouses: Robert Joseph Monn (m. 1999, divorced) Alfred Molina (m. 2021)
- Children: 1
- Awards: Academy Award for Best Animated Feature; Frozen (2013)

Jennifer Michelle Lee (born Jennifer Michelle Rebecchi; October 22, 1971) is an American filmmaker and playwright. She served as the chief creative officer (CCO) of Walt Disney Animation Studios from 2018 to 2024, before stepping down to return to full-time filmmaking. She is best known as the writer and one of the directors of Frozen (2013) and its sequel Frozen 2 (2019), the former of which earned her an Academy Award for Best Animated Feature. Besides being the first female CCO of Walt Disney Animation Studios, Lee was the first female director of a Walt Disney Animation Studios feature film and the first female director of two feature films that each earned more than $1 billion in gross box office revenue.

== Early life ==
Jennifer Michelle Rebecchi was born on October 22, 1971 to Linda Lee and Saverio Rebecchi, who were living in Barrington, Rhode Island at the time. After their divorce, Lee and her older sister Amy, who later became an English teacher, lived with their mother in East Providence, Rhode Island. Both Lee and her older sister graduated from East Providence High School and the University of New Hampshire. Lee earned a bachelor's degree in English in 1992 and relocated to New York City, where she worked as a graphic artist in publishing; she designed audiobooks for Random House. As an adult, she began using her mother's maiden name, Lee, in a professional capacity and in January 1995, legally changed her last name from Rebecchi to Lee.

== Career ==
Lee graduated from Columbia University School of the Arts' Film Program with an MFA in film in 2005. While at Columbia, she won several awards for excellence in screenwriting and gave birth to her daughter.

Her script for The Round Up was a quarter-finalist in the Nicholl Fellowships in Screenwriting competition in 2009 and was subsequently optioned by Appian Way Productions.

In March 2011, Phil Johnston, a former classmate at Columbia, called Lee to ask her to join him at Disney Animation in Burbank to help him write Wreck-It Ralph. What was supposed to be a temporary eight-week writing gig eventually turned into a much longer commitment. First, she was asked to stay on until Ralph was finished. She then became involved with Frozen, initially as screenwriter and later as director alongside Chris Buck. When Lee was brought on board, she helped transition the film from an action-adventure to "more musical, with more comedy." She worked closely with the songwriters (Robert Lopez and Kristen Anderson-Lopez) in the writing of the script. Frozen gave her the opportunity to celebrate "wild and wonderful" girls like her childhood self, and her daughter, Agatha. Lee drew inspiration from her life to create one of the biggest animated films ever. Lee inspired Frozen from her relationship with her sister, Amy. Connecting script to real life, Lee referred to herself as the wild, little daydreaming mess, a Tasmanian devil, and [Amy] was always the responsible one, a straight-A student," says Ms. Lee, who identifies with Kristen Bell's clear-as-a-bell Anna, not Idina Menzel's Elsa. Audiences worldwide resonated with the story of two sisters, as Frozen was also the highest-earning film with a female director in terms of domestic earnings, until surpassed by Warner Bros.' Wonder Woman.

On May 17, 2014, Lee delivered the commencement address to the class of 2014 at her alma mater, the University of New Hampshire. She revealed that she had struggled with self-doubt while growing up, and then in April of her junior year of college, her boyfriend was killed in a boating accident, after which she felt "no doubt, only grief ... and for a brief moment ... [knew] better than to waste a second doubting." Years later, that memory would help her overcome her initial doubt over whether she was good enough to apply to Columbia. At Columbia, Johnston recognized she was talented but insecure, and one day asked her to "promise ... that you'll leave it out of your work, just know that you're good enough and move on." She concluded: "If I learned one thing it is that self-doubt is one of the most destructive forces. It makes you defensive instead of open, reactive instead of active. Self-doubt is consuming and cruel and my hope today is that we can all collectively agree to ban it ... Please know, from here on out, you are enough and dare I say, more than enough." UNH then awarded her the honorary degree of Doctor of Humane Letters.

In September 2014, it was announced that Lee and Buck would co-direct a short film featuring the Frozen characters called Frozen Fever. It was released in March 2015. Lee was one of several Disney writers and directors who received credit for "Creative Leadership" on Big Hero 6 (2014), Zootopia (2016), and Moana (2016), and also received a story co-writer credit on Zootopia.

In August 2014, Variety reported that Lee's next project after Frozen would be an adaptation of Madeleine L'Engle's 1962 novel A Wrinkle in Time. After the news broke, Lee tweeted: "Been in love with the book for over 30 years. Writing this script means the world to me." Catherine Hand, the executive producer of the 2003 television film version, and Jim Whitaker produced for Disney, and Ava DuVernay directed the film, based on Lee's script. A Wrinkle in Time was released in March 2018.

On March 12, 2015, Disney announced that Lee and Buck would co-direct a full length sequel to Frozen.

In June 2018, Lee was named the chief creative officer of Walt Disney Animation Studios, following John Lasseter's departure from Disney. Lee was the studio's first woman creative chief, a milestone for the company that was established in 1923. During her time as CCO, she first finished overseeing Ralph Breaks the Internet (2018), a film for which she was already an executive producer, in the final five months leading up to its release following the exit of Lasseter who was the primary executive producer and CCO on that film since its inception in 2014. Lee also remained the director (alongside Buck) and writer of the sequel to Frozen, now officially titled Frozen 2 (2019), the first film primarily under her leadership. Frozen 2 would become the highest-grossing animated film of all-time in January 2020, until Inside Out 2 (2024) surpassed it in July 2024. Following Frozen 2, Lee would oversee the production of Raya and the Last Dragon (2021), Encanto (2021), Strange World (2022), Wish (2023), and Moana 2 (2024). Lee also co-wrote Wish, a film that was started under her leadership in 2018 and was created to celebrate the legacy of the Walt Disney Animation Studios.

In September 2024, Lee announced that she was stepping down from her position as Disney Animation's chief creative officer to return to full-time filmmaking at the studio—specifically, to direct and write Frozen 3 and to also write and executive produce Frozen 4. Jared Bush was named as her successor. Prior to Bush's succession in the role, Lee also oversaw Zootopia 2 (2025), a film which Bush directed (alongside Byron Howard) and wrote.

== Personal life ==
Lee married Robert Joseph Monn on May 30, 1999, at the Rhode Island Country Club. They have a daughter, Agatha Lee Monn (b. 2003), who voices pre-teen Anna for the middle verse of "Do You Want to Build a Snowman?" in Frozen. They later divorced.

In November 2019, Lee confirmed that she was in a relationship with Frozen 2 actor Alfred Molina. They were married in August 2021 by actor and mutual friend Jonathan Groff who had introduced them, and live in the San Fernando Valley in Los Angeles County, California with Lee's daughter.

== Filmography ==
=== Films ===
Year	Film	Credited as				
Year	Film	Director	Writer	Executive Producer	Other	Notes
2012	Wreck-It Ralph	No	Yes	No	No	
2013	Frozen	Yes	Yes	No	Yes	Voice of Queen Iduna / Additional Voices
2014	Big Hero 6	No	No	No	Yes	Creative Leadership
2016	Zootopia	No	Story	No	Yes	Creative Leadership
2016	Moana	No	No	No	Yes	Creative Leadership
2018	A Wrinkle in Time	No	Yes	No	No	
2018	Ralph Breaks the Internet	No	No	Yes	Yes	Studio and Creative Leadership
2019	Frozen 2	Yes	Yes	No	Yes	Studio and Creative Leadership
2021	Raya and the Last Dragon	No	No	Yes	Yes	Studio and Creative Leadership
2021	Encanto	No	No	Yes	Yes	Studio and Creative Leadership
2022	Strange World	No	No	Yes	Yes	Studio and Creative Leadership
2023	Wish	No	Yes	Yes	Yes	Studio and Creative Leadership
2024	Moana 2	No	No	Yes	Yes	Studio and Creative Leadership
2025	Zootopia 2	No	No	No	Yes	Studio and Creative Leadership
2026	Hexed	No	No	No	Yes	Studio and Creative Leadership
2027	Frozen 3	Yes	Yes	No	Yes	Studio and Creative Leadership
TBA	Frozen 4	TBA	Yes	Yes	Yes	Studio and Creative Leadership

=== Shorts and series ===
Year	Title	Director	Story	Executive Producer	Notes
2004	A Thousand Words	Assistant	No	Producer	
2015	Frozen Fever	Yes	Yes	No	
2020	At Home with Olaf	No	No	Yes	YouTube short films
2020	Once Upon a Snowman	No	No	Yes	Disney+ Original short film
2021	Us Again	No	No	Yes	
2021	How to Stay at Home	No	No	Yes	Special Thanks, Disney+ Original short films
2021	Olaf Presents	No	No	Yes	Disney+ Original short films
2021	Far from the Tree	No	No	Yes	
2022	Baymax!	No	No	Yes	Disney+ Original short films
2022	Zootopia+	No	No	Yes	Disney+ Original short films
2023	Once Upon a Studio	No	No	Yes	
2024	Iwájú	No	No	Yes	Disney+ Original long-form limited series
2024	D.I.Y. Duck	No	No	Yes	
2025	Versa	No	No	Yes	

=== Other credits ===
Year	Title	Credit
2014	The Story of Frozen: Making a Disney Animated Classic	Herself
2016	Imagining Zootopia	Herself
2017	Quality Problems	Very Special Thanks
2017	Olaf's Frozen Adventure	Special Thanks
2020	Into the Unknown: Making Frozen 2	Herself, Special Thanks

== Accolades ==
Year	Award	Category	Work	Result	Reference
2013	EDA Award	Best Animated Feature Film	Frozen	Nominated	
2013	EDA Female Focus Award	Best Woman Director	Frozen	Nominated	
2013	EDA Female Focus Award	Best Woman Screenwriter	Frozen	Nominated	
2013	AFCA Award	Best Animated Film	Frozen	Won	
2013	Dubai International Film Festival	People's Choice Award	Frozen	Won	
2013	SLFCA Award	Best Animated Film	Frozen	Won	
2013	Annie Awards	Writing in an Animated Feature Production	Wreck-It Ralph	Won	
2014	Academy Awards	Best Animated Feature Film of the Year	Frozen	Won	
2014	BAFTA Film Award	Best Animated Film	Frozen	Won	
2014	BAFTA Children's Award	BAFTA Kids Vote – Feature Film	Frozen	Won	
2014	BAFTA Children's Award	Best Feature Film	Frozen	Nominated	
2014	Saturn Award	Best Writing	Frozen	Nominated	
2014	Annie Awards	Outstanding Achievement in Directing in an Animated Feature Production	Frozen	Won	
2014	Annie Awards	Outstanding Achievement in Writing in an Animated Feature Production	Frozen	Nominated	
2014	Gold Derby Award	Animated Feature	Frozen	Won	
2014	Hugo Award	Best Dramatic Presentation – Long Form	Frozen	Nominated	
2014	International Online Cinema Awards (INOCA)	Best Animated Feature	Frozen	Won	
2014	Italian Online Movie Awards (IOMA)	Best Animated Feature Film (Miglior film d'animazione)	Frozen	Nominated	
2014	Seattle Film Critics Award	Best Animated Feature	Frozen	Won	
2014	VES Award	Outstanding Animation in an Animated Feature Motion Picture	Frozen	Won	
2015	Tokyo Anime Award	Grand Prize, Feature Film	Frozen	Won	
2017	Gold Derby Award	Original Screenplay	Zootopia	Nominated	
2018	Tony Awards	Tony Award for Best Book of a Musical	Frozen	Nominated	
2019	Seattle Film Critics Award	Best Animated Feature	Frozen II	Nominated	
2020	BAFTA Film Award	Best Animated Featured Film	Frozen II	Nominated	
2020	Annie Awards	Outstanding Achievement for Directing in an Animated Feature Production	Frozen II	Nominated	
2020	Annie Awards	Outstanding Achievement for Writing in an Animated Feature Production	Frozen II	Nominated	
2020	Gold Derby Award	Animated Feature	Frozen II	Nominated	
2020	LEJA Award	Best Animated Feature	Frozen II	Nominated	
2020	OFTA Film Award	Best Animated Picture	Frozen II	Nominated	
2023	Children's and Family Emmy Awards	Outstanding Children's or Young Teen Animated Series	Zootopia+	Won	
2023	Children's and Family Emmy Awards	Outstanding Children's or Young Teen Animated Series	Baymax!	Nominated	
2024	Children's and Family Emmy Awards	Outstanding Children's or Young Teen Animated Series	Iwájú	Nominated	
2024	Children's and Family Emmy Awards	Outstanding Animated Short Form Program	Once Upon a Studio	Won	
