= Paul Briggs (animator) =

American animator (born 1974)

- Born: December 17, 1974 (age 51); San Antonio, Texas, U.S.
- Education: Kansas City Art Institute
- Occupations: Animator, voice actor
- Years active: 1996–present
- Employer(s): Walt Disney Animation Studios (1996–2021); Netflix (2021–present)
- Known for: Head of story on Frozen, Big Hero 6, Zootopia and Raya and the Last Dragon

Paul Briggs (born December 17‚ 1974) is an American animator and voice actor. He is best known for working for the Walt Disney Animation Studios as a head of story on films such as Frozen, Big Hero 6, Zootopia and Raya and the Last Dragon.

== Early life ==
Briggs was born on December 17, 1974, in San Antonio, Texas, and went to Kansas City Art Institute in Kansas City, Missouri.

== Career ==
Briggs started his career by an internship at the Walt Disney Animation Studios in 1996 and worked on the animated film Hercules as a visual effects artist.

In 2009, Briggs worked as a story artist on the animated film The Princess and the Frog, which released on December 11, 2009. He also provided the inaudible voice of Two Fingers, a character who was part of a bumbling trio of Cajun frog hunters.

In 2013, he worked on the animated film Frozen as a head of story, which released on November 27, 2013. He also voiced the character Marshmallow.

In 2014, Briggs again worked as the storyboard supervisor on the animated film Big Hero 6, which released on November 7, 2014. He also voiced the minor character Yama.

In October 2018, he was set to direct a film titled Dragon Empire, alongside Dean Wellins. On August 24, 2019, at D23 Expo this information was confirmed, now titled Raya and the Last Dragon, to be released on November 25, 2020. The date was later changed to March 12, 2021, due to the COVID-19 pandemic. In August 2020, Disney announced that Don Hall and Carlos López Estrada replaced Briggs and Wellins as directors on the film, with Briggs demoted to a co-director and Wellins removed from the project altogether.

== Filmography ==
=== Feature films ===
Year	Film	Credited as							
Year	Film	Director	Story Writer	Head of Story	Story Artist	Visual Effects Animator	Other	Voice Role	Notes
1991	Beauty and the Beast	No	No	No	No	Yes	No		The Special Edition, 2002
1996	The Hunchback of Notre Dame	No	No	No	No	Uncredited	No		
1997	Hercules	No	No	No	No	Additional	No		Effects in-between-er
1998	Mulan	No	No	No	No	Assistant	No		Effects assistant
1999	Tarzan	No	No	No	No	Additional	No		
2002	Lilo & Stitch	No	No	No	No	Key Assistant	No		
2003	Brother Bear	No	No	No	No	Key Assistant	No		
2008	Bolt	No	No	No	Additional	No	No		
2009	The Princess and the Frog	No	No	No	Yes	No	Yes	Two Fingers	
2010	Tangled	No	No	No	Yes	No	No		
2011	Gnomeo & Juliet	No	No	No	Uncredited	No	No		
2011	Winnie the Pooh	No	No	No	Yes	No	Yes		Additional Story Material
2013	Frozen	No	No	Yes	No	No	Yes	Marshmallow	
2014	Big Hero 6	No	No	Yes	No	No	Yes	Yama	Departmental Leadership
2016	Zootopia	No	No	No	No	No	Yes		Additional Story, Creative Leadership
2016	Moana	No	No	No	No	No	Yes		Additional Story, Creative Leadership
2018	Ralph Breaks the Internet	No	No	No	Additional	No	Yes		Creative Leadership
2019	Frozen 2	No	No	No	No	No	Yes	Marshmallow	Creative Leadership
2021	Raya and the Last Dragon	Co-Director	Yes	No	No	No	Yes		Studio and Creative Leadership
2021	Encanto	No	No	No	No	No	Yes		Studio and Creative Leadership

=== Short films ===
Year	Film	Credited as				
Year	Film	Story Writer	Story Artist	Other	Voice Role	Notes
2011	Prep & Landing: Naughty vs. Nice	Yes	No	No		TV special
2013	Get a Horse!	Yes	Yes	Yes	Additional Voices	
2015	Frozen Fever	No	No	Yes	Marshmallow	

=== Television ===
Year	Title	Prop Designer	Voice Actor	Voice Role	Notes
2005	Avatar: The Last Airbender	Yes	No		2 episodes
2005	Duck Dodgers	Yes	No		2 episodes
2017–21	Big Hero 6: The Series	No	Yes	Yama	9 episodes

=== Video games ===
Year	Title	Voice Role
2019	Kingdom Hearts III	Marshmallow

=== Documentaries ===
Year	Title	Role
2020	Into the Unknown: Making Frozen II	Himself

=== Other Credits ===
Year	Title	Credit
2016	Born in China	Special Thanks
2025	In Your Dreams	Special Thanks

== Accolades ==
For his work on Raya and the Last Dragon, he was nominated at the 2021 Seattle Film Critics Society Awards for Best Animated Feature.
