= Anna (Frozen) =

Fictional character from the Frozen franchise

- Frozen character
- Anna as she appears in Frozen (2013).
- First appearance: Frozen (2013)
- Created by: Chris Buck; Jennifer Lee
- Voiced by: Kristen Bell (adult); Livvy Stubenrauch (5-year-old); Katie Lopez (5-year-old); Agatha Lee Monn (9-year-old); Hadley Gannaway (young); Abby Trott (Dreamlight Valley)
- Portrayed by: Patty Murin/Stephanie Mckeon (stage musical); Elizabeth Lail (Once Upon a Time)
- Inspired by: Gerda from Hans Christian Andersen's The Snow Queen

In-universe information
- Title(s): Queen of Arendelle; Princess of Arendelle
- Family: King Agnarr (father); Queen Iduna (mother); Elsa (sister)
- Significant other: Kristoff (fiancé)
- Relatives: King Runeard (grandfather)
- Nationality: Arendellian
- Age: 18 to 21 years old
- Birth date: Summer Solstice

Anna of Arendelle (/ˈɑːnə/ AH-nə) is a fictional character who appears in Walt Disney Animation Studios' 53rd animated fantasy film Frozen (2013) and its sequel Frozen 2 (2019). She is voiced by Kristen Bell as an adult. At the beginning of the film, Livvy Stubenrauch and Katie Lopez provide her speaking and singing voice as a young child, respectively. Agatha Lee Monn portrayed her as a nine-year-old (singing). In Frozen 2, Hadley Gannaway provided her voice as a young child while Stubenrauch is the archive audio.

Created by co-writers and directors Jennifer Lee and Chris Buck, Anna is loosely based on Gerda, a character from the Danish fairytale "The Snow Queen" by Hans Christian Andersen. In the Disney film adaptation, Anna is depicted as the princess of Arendelle, a fictional Scandinavian kingdom, and the younger sister of Elsa (Idina Menzel), who is the heiress to the throne and possesses the elemental ability to create and control ice and snow. When Elsa exiles herself from the kingdom after inadvertently sending Arendelle into an eternal winter on the evening of her coronation, Anna goes on a dangerous adventure and brings her sister back.

The original fairytale in general and the character of the Snow Queen in particular posed long-term problems to adapt into a feature-length production. Several film executives, including Walt Disney, made their attempts towards the story and numerous adaptations were shelved as the filmmakers could not work out the characters. Finally, directors Buck and Lee solved the issue by portraying Anna and Elsa as sisters, establishing a dynamic relationship between the characters.

Film critics praised Anna's determination and enthusiasm in her personality and Bell for her performance in the films.

== Development ==
=== Origins and conception ===
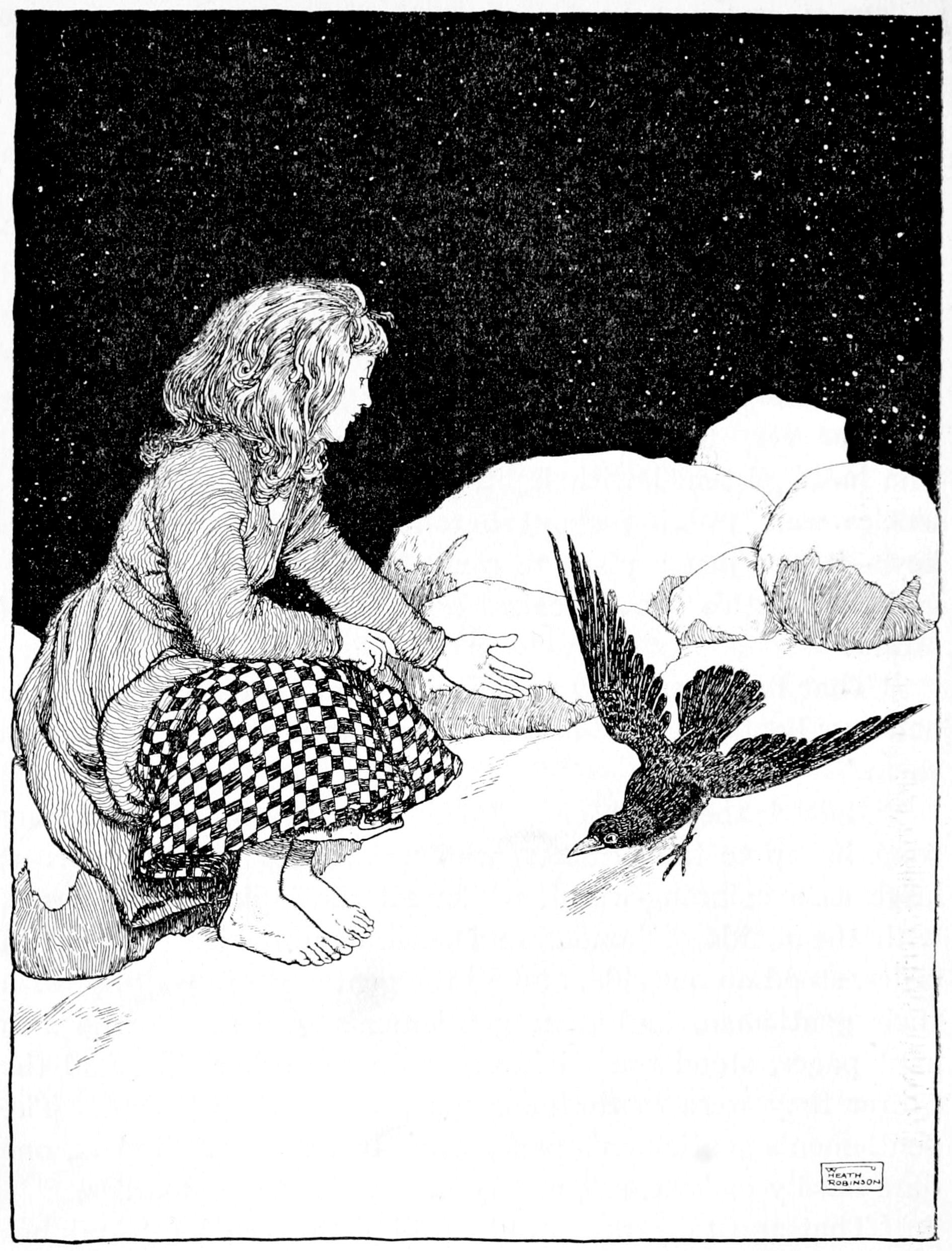
An illustration of Gerda, the character Anna is based upon.

Attempts to produce an adaption of "The Snow Queen" in the Disney studio dated back to 1943, when Walt Disney considered collaborating with Samuel Goldwyn to produce a biography film of Hans Christian Andersen. However, the story and particularly the Snow Queen character proved to be too problematic to Disney and his animators. Namely one of the troubles they encountered was that the original story lacked necessary interaction between the main protagonist, Gerda (who later served as an inspiration for Anna), and the Snow Queen. Most obviously, Andersen's version did not feature any confrontation between them: when brave little Gerda enters the Snow Queen's ice castle and sheds her tears on Kay, the Snow Queen is nowhere to be seen. There just was not enough character conflict to form a full-length feature. Later on, Glen Keane, Paul and Gaëtan Brizzi, Harvey Fierstein, Dick Zondag and Dave Goetz were among other Disney executives to make efforts towards translating this potential material to the big screen, but none of them made their way. Around 2008, Chris Buck pitched Disney his version of The Snow Queen. At the time, the project was planned to be traditionally animated under the name of Anna and the Snow Queen. However, by early 2010, the project encountered the same problem and was stuck again. Jennifer Lee, Frozen's co-director, later recalled, "The issue with the original for us in a lot of ways is it's a very symbolic story. It's very hard to translate symbolism into concrete things. Film is concrete, so you translate it."

After the success of Tangled (2010), on December 22, 2011, Disney announced a release date, November 27, 2013, for the film, together with a new title, Frozen, and Peter Del Vecho and John Lasseter took up as the project's producers. Once the film was revived again, one of the main challenges for Buck and his team was the character. The storyboards were presented to John Lasseter, who told the assembled production team, "You haven't dug deep enough." Lasseter said that Chris Buck's latest version was fun and very light-hearted, but the characters were not multifaceted, and thus did not resonate with the producer.

The original character of Gerda, known as Anna, was one of the three major characters in the script at this time, along with the Snow Queen, Elsa and Kristoff, loosely based on Kay. The characters were not considered to be well-rounded or relatable. An interpersonal and family dynamic was created once Anna and Elsa were established as sisters, an idea suggested by someone on the writing team, but no one remembered who made the suggestion. This changed the story dramatically, shifting from the conflict between the good and the evil to the conflict between love and fear. Buck stated that their script still retained basic parts of the story and the character of Gerda, citing the similarities between the original story and his version, "[Gerda] won't give up on finding her friend Kay. The only thing she really has in her, because she's not a superhero or anything, is love. In the end it's love that conquers fear."

=== Voice ===
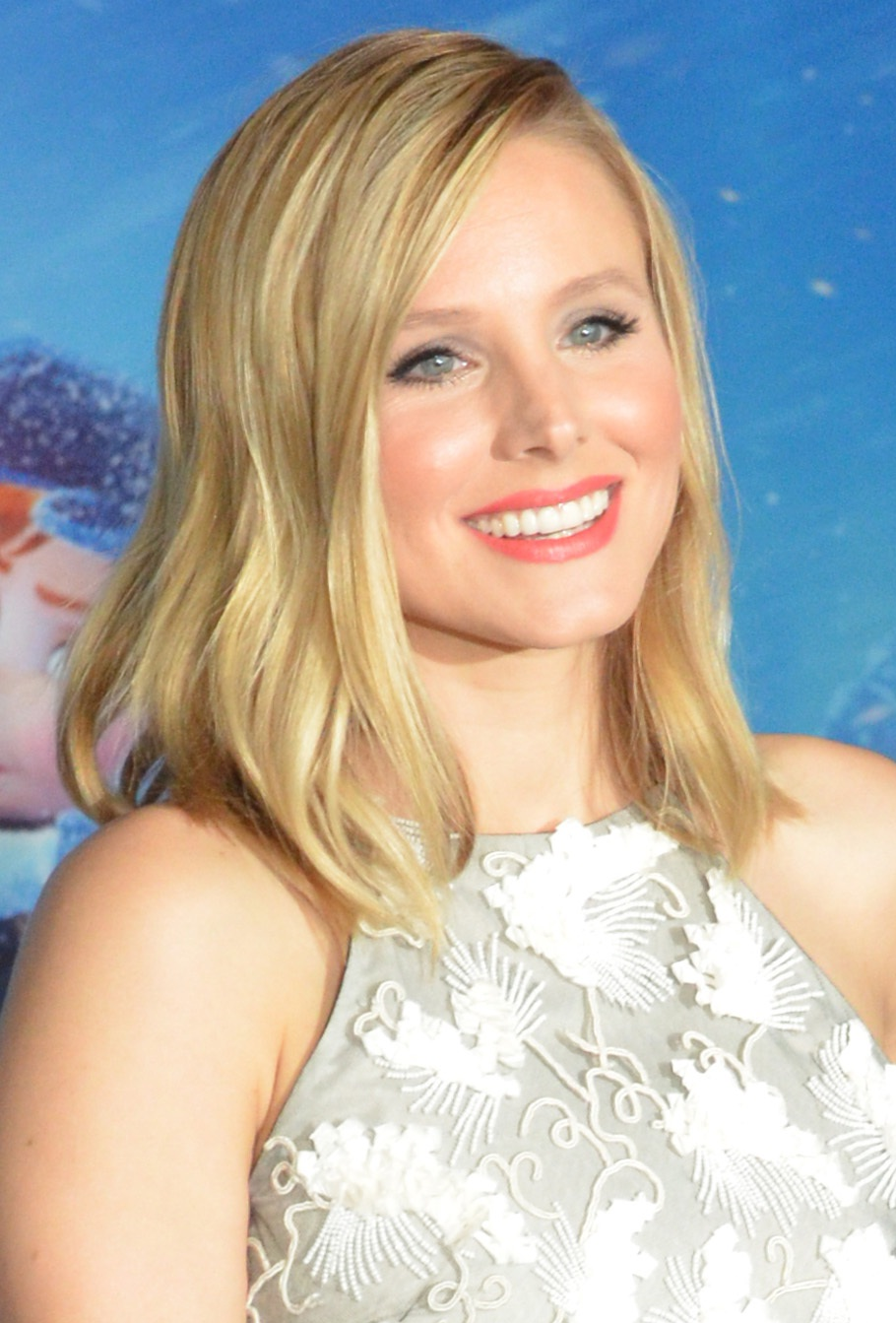
Kristen Bell provided the voice for Anna

On March 5, 2012, Kristen Bell was cast to voice the adult Anna. Livvy Stubenrauch was chosen to portray Anna as a young child, while Katie Lopez, daughter of the husband-and-wife songwriting team of the film, Kristen Anderson-Lopez and Robert Lopez, provided the singing voice for young Anna in "Do You Want to Build a Snowman?" musical sequence. Additionally, Agatha Lee Monn, daughter of the film's director Jennifer Lee, portrayed teenage Anna in this song. Lee explained about these casting decisions, "We really wanted to use the first two verses of this song to show you Anna's personality. And we wanted the singing to be done by real-sounding kids, not necessarily Broadway kids." Bell and Idina Menzel, who voiced Elsa, had both auditioned for Rapunzel in Tangled and had already known each other, but they did not get the part.

Talking about her feelings when she got the part, Bell expressed, "Since I was 4 years old, I dreamed of being in a Disney animated film," she said. "It was the first goal I ever set for myself. It seemed like it would be a very unrealistic one." She described Disney films as "the ones [she] watched over and over again when [she] was a kid," and continued, "I knew every line from The Little Mermaid. I love Aladdin. When asked about her favorite Disney character, Bell said, "Ariel from The Little Mermaid. Because I think it was a shift that Disney had, where a female lead—the "princess," I guess—didn't just want to find her mate. She was singing "I want to be where the people are. I want to see the world. I want to venture outside my comfort zone."" Bell described her initial reaction when she first found that she was cast as "I was in glee". Lee admitted Bell's casting selection was influenced after the filmmakers listened a couple of vocal tracks from The Little Mermaid, including "Part of Your World" that the actress recorded when she was young, stating that without these recordings, it would've been very difficult to the find the right one to play Anna.

The two directors, Buck and Lee, were also impressed by how Bell and Menzel related. "During one of our early read-throughs, Kristen and Idina sang a ballad to each other which had so much emotion that everyone in the room was in tears," Buck said. "It not only showed how great their voices were together, but showed the power the music would have in the story." However, Bell was not all confidence when recording with Menzel, described the experiences working with her co-star as "nerve-racking". The duo had rehearsed at Idina's house a song called "Wind Beneath My Wings", during which Bell praised Idina's powerful voice. Regarding the songs that she performed in the film, Bell said, "We're singing the lovely songs of Kristen and Bobby Lopez, who wrote 'Book of Mormon.' So it's really, really funny music. It's really good music. They're amazing to work for."

Director Jennifer Lee strongly believed that there could not be any other Anna but Kristen Bell, saying, "It was definitely a wonderful surprise hearing her voice [during auditions], not knowing that she had been classically trained. Also, she had such a warm, sweet voice. She was everything that we could've hoped for Anna." Co-director Chris Buck shared Lee's ideas, commenting, "Kristen Bell for Anna was the very first person that we saw. We did a lot of casting to find Anna, but she just hit it out of the park. From the beginning we loved her, and she just kind of became Anna and Anna became her. I don't know which one is which." Idina Menzel was also surprised by her co-star's singing ability, stating that, "I didn't know how great a singer she was. I quickly found out and need to constantly tell her because she doesn't tell anybody else! She's always playing it down." Songwriter Kristen Anderson-Lopez later commended Bell's quick comprehension of her ideas, saying that she would collaborate with the actress for "the rest of [her] life" if she could. Anna's animator Becky Bresee commented that Bell's voice "lends itself well, so you are taking bits and pieces."

During production, Bell and Menzel had to do a lot of recordings and re-recordings, and were required to be together in the same room when on the key emotional scenes between Anna and Elsa. "We even got Kristen and Idina together for a song. That really helped elevate the song because they have a duet in the movie and it definitely helped drive that," said producer Peter Del Vecho. Chris Buck later commented that getting the actresses in together as much as they could helped add the real, amazing chemistry between them and made them really interact. Bell's recording sessions were completed while she was pregnant, and later she had to re-record some of the lines after giving birth, as her voice had deepened. After watching the completed film, Bell described her performance as "cool and weird and surreal and jarring", saying that she was really proud that Anna "came out like she did that [the directors] let [Bell] do her like this."

=== Design and characterization ===
Anna in particular and the whole film in general had undergone a number of changes in the story, most notably making the heroine the younger sister of the Snow Queen. Describing the character's development process, director Jennifer Lee admitted, "Even with Anna there was a tug of war for a long time. There are elements of it that we didn't land on with Anna until late into production, so we changed some of the animation to support it." Bell generally described her character as "She doesn't have good postures, she's not very elegant, but she's a good person and she's utterly determined." Lee added, "She doesn't have any superpowers, but Anna is one of these ordinary people doing an extraordinary thing." Contrary to her sister Elsa who represents fear, Anna represents love, she is filled with optimism with an extraordinary heart. Director Chris Buck later stated, "[Anna's] secret weapon is love," while head of story Paul Briggs commented that she is "a character who is willing to stand beside you and stand up for what's right. Her sister was born with a condition that's shaped a world where Anna doesn't belong." In the images of Frozen's main characters released by Disney in July 2013, Anna and her role in the film was described as follows:

Anna is more daring than graceful and, at times, can act before she thinks. But she’s also the most optimistic and caring person you’ll ever meet. She longs to reconnect with her sister, Elsa, as they were close during their childhood. When Elsa accidentally unleashes a magical secret that locks the kingdom of Arendelle in an eternal winter, Anna embarks on a dangerous adventure to make things right. Armed with only her fearlessness, a never-give-up attitude and her faith in others, Anna is determined to save both her kingdom and her family.

"I'm really excited to show it to people. I became a part of the kind of movie I wanted to see as a kid," she said. "I always loved Disney animation, but there was something about the females that was unattainable to me. Their posture was too good and they were too well-spoken, and I feel like I really made this girl much more relatable and weirder and scrappier and more excitable and awkward. I'm really proud of that."
—Kristen Bell on her approach to the character of Anna.

In order to have one person fully understand and develop their own character, as well as later be able to impart that to the crew, the film's directors and producers decided to have character leads and supervising animators on specific characters. First-time character lead Becky Bresee serves as the supervising animator for Anna. She described her job as "making the character more believable". To achieve this, she had to act out part of a sequence in the movie between Anna and Kristoff for a number of times, each of them emphasizing the character's gestures differently. "Anna's a little bit nervous and uncomfortable, and I had to find a way to put that into the animation," explained Bresee.

Bell said that at first Anna was written plainer and more general. "In the first draft of the script she was written more, in my opinion, prissy. She was kind of specific and very girly," which Bell did not find appealing. She admitted that she had always wanted to be part of Disney animated feature, but she "wanted to be a very specific type of princess", who "was way more awkward than the normal princesses", not someone with too good postures or too well-spoken. As she was offered the role of Anna, she came up with a lot of suggestions for the directors. They were responsive and allowed the actress to mold the character the way she wanted, since they wanted the film to be truthful. Bell significantly made specific changes to Anna, including the infusion and incorporation of the actress' own personality to the character, embodying a relatable heroine, which received full support from the directors. She called the scene where Anna first meets Hans is a "typical Disney moment", as they come too close physically and find out that they both fall in love with each other. Bell wanted Anna's words to reflect what she herself would say in real life, which included some "nonsensical rambling". "I think I said, "This is awkward. You're not awkward. Me, I'm awkward. You're gorgeous. Wait—what?" Words just spill out of her mouth too quickly and she has to backtrack." Bell continued. Or the whole scene where she wakes up in the beginning with saliva all over the face, Bell "wanted her to also have hair in her mouth", which took inspiration from her own real life. "Sometimes I wake up like that. Then you have hair in your mouth, and you start coughing. The animators totally got what I was trying to do. It's cool, and way more fun when stuff is realistic like that, instead of the perfection of waking up with mascara on." Anna's snorting and tripping over also drew inspirations from Bell's real life. Bell's recording sessions were also videotaped to assist in animating the character, and animators took into considerations even subtle things like the actress' biting her lip a lot. According to director Jennifer Lee, Anna is a bit flawed.

"I think I'll be the most proud of this character for a long time. There was so much of me that was put into this character. There was a lot of collaboration, and not just in the fact of, here is the character, and here is what I want to bring, and here is what you want to bring. I really wanted to infuse her with who I am. I wanted the heart behind it to be that things didn't come to her; the birds didn't come and braid her hair. She went out and fought for things. I'm really proud that little girls will be able to see that, because that's what I wanted. So I will be thinking about her for a while."
—Kristen Bell on Anna's influence to her in the future.

When asked about Anna's biggest charm, Bell said that "her charm is caught somewhere between her sincerity and optimism. Anna is genuine, sincere and compounded with optimism, and eternally optimistic people are the most charismatic people, much more attractive than those with a bad mood." She also expressed why the character seemed so loveable to her, "To have Anna in a situation where she starts the movie without any friends, because her lifestyle hasn't allowed her to have a full kingdom. She runs around, because she wants friends." Bell called the film's story is "another turning point" for Disney animation because the love depicted in this story is the love between siblings, a non-romantic love. Anna wants the world and she wants to explore, but she also wants to nurture the relationships around her, particularly the family relationship. "It's very non-traditional for a Disney movie," she added.

Regarding Bell's influence on Anna, director Chris Buck said her personality was just so fun and energetic. "We had an Anna character but Kristen really came in and pushed it and made it even funnier and even sweeter I think, and more believable as a three-dimensional character," he said. He also admitted that he "fell in love with [Bell]'s voice and [Bell]'s spirit". Director Jennifer Lee said that she loved Bell because the actress shared a similarity with her, that girls could be funny. "So she was a fantastic collaborator," Lee added. Songwriting duo Kristen-Anderson Lopez and Robert Lopez later commented that they had written a lot of first songs for Bell, for Anna but, "The more we were working with Kristen Bell, the more, the more she influenced." They quickly understand who Anna was because Bell.

From left to right: Anna's coronation dress, her winter travel outfit and her summer casual wear.

Anna's costumes in the film were informed by the research of Norwegian clothing styles. Based on these findings, art director Brittney Lee and her team later found out what materials should be used for the costumes. Co-director Jennifer Lee created a cheerful wardrobe featuring "playful" floral patterns and saturated colors in order to accurately reflect Anna's personality. The animators also took into account the climate that Anna is living in, costuming her in heavy wools and velvets, reflecting traditional winter clothing of the Scandinavian area. The animators added structures to the costumes in a way, such as pleated dresses, that allows movements, giving the character a free range of "twirl[ing] all she wants" throughout the film. To deepen the cultural context of the film, rosemaling, a traditional form of Norwegian decorative folk art, was added to almost every character's costumes. Anna and her sister, Elsa, also enjoyed a large number of types of costumes and the layers of costuming that have never been done before. As these characters are running around in the snow, they have to have petticoats, undergarments, capes, "and they have all these layers and layers of things that are all meticulously designed," Brittney explained.

== International voices ==
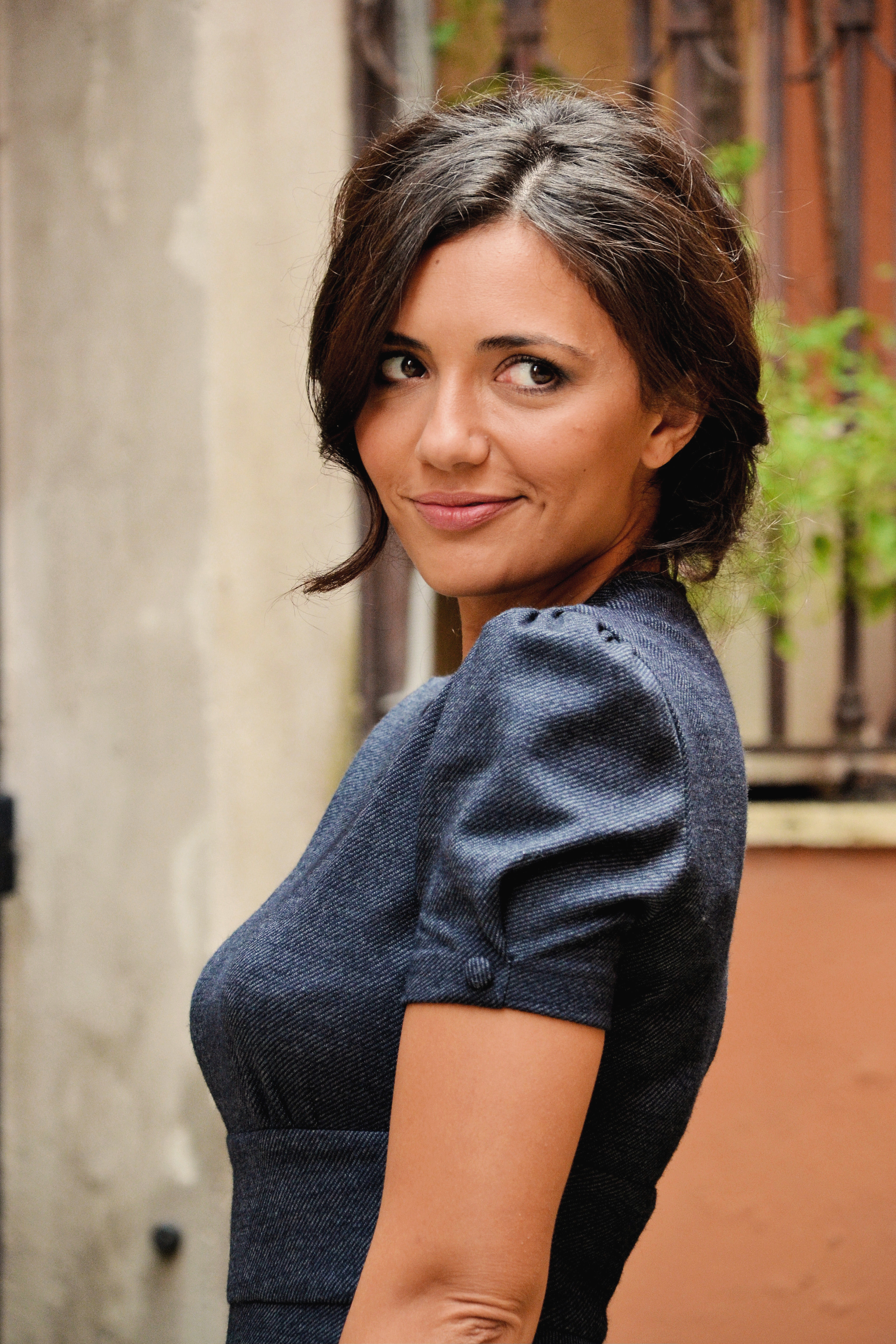
Italian actress and singer Serena Rossi and the Italian cast of Frozen were awarded best foreign dubbing worldwide

At the time of its original theatrical release in 2013, Frozen numbered 43 versions all over the world, to which 3 more versions were added in the following years, along with some unofficial versions, created by independent studios around the world. In 2019, Frozen 2 was released in 47 versions worldwide, including a special Sami language dubbing, created specifically for this movie for the inspiration it took from the Sami culture.

Parineeti Chopra and her cousin Priyanka Chopra voiced Anna and Elsa respectively in the spoken parts in Frozen II in Hindi.

Serena Rossi and the cast of the Italian version of Frozen were awarded best foreign dubbing worldwide.

Véronique Claveau performed the Canadian French version of Anna.

== Appearances ==
=== Frozen filmography ===
==== Frozen ====
Anna is the main protagonist in the first film. The main storyline is her efforts to reconcile with her sister Elsa and end the winter Elsa has cast over Arendelle.

Anna first appears at the age of five. Following an accident while playing with Elsa one morning, Anna is locked in the castle for many years and separated from her sister. During this time, she remains unaware of Elsa's magic, due to Grand Pabbie, the chief of a tribe of trolls, having altered her memory. Elsa constantly ignores her, and she has no idea why.

On Elsa's coronation day, Anna is excited about being allowed out and meeting people, and quickly becomes engaged to Prince Hans. However, Elsa forbids their marriage and, during an argument between the sisters, Anna becomes aware again of Elsa's ice power when she unleashes it accidentally in her anger. As Elsa flees to the North Mountain, freezing Arendelle in the process, Anna decides she must go and find her to bring her back and end the winter.

At a shop along the way, Anna acquires her trademark outfit and meets Kristoff, whom she convinces to escort her up the North Mountain to see Elsa. En route, she meets and is befriended by Olaf, the sisters' childhood snowman whom Elsa has recreated and brought to life. But when Anna reaches Elsa's ice palace and begs her to return, Elsa refuses and orders Anna to leave for her own safety. Again Elsa unleashes her power in anger, this time freezing Anna's heart, as Grand Pabbie reveals when Kristoff takes her to the trolls after noticing her hair turning white. She learns that she will die unless an act of true love thaws her heart before her body freezes solid.

Believing a kiss with Hans is what Anna needs, Kristoff rushes her back to Arendelle. However, Anna is heartbroken to learn that Hans is not her true love, but planned to marry her only to seize control of Arendelle's throne. She is locked in a room of the castle and left to die, but saved by Olaf. Anna realizes she doesn't truly understand love, but Olaf makes her realize Kristoff loves her, and the two escape the castle to reunite with him. En route, she sees Hans about to kill Elsa. She quickly jumps in to block the attack, sacrificing herself to save her sister, and freezes solid at that moment. Since this sacrifice constitutes an act of true love, Anna survives and her heart and body thaw.

Following this, Elsa warms to Anna and they head back to a thawing Arendelle together. Anna and Kristoff acknowledge their mutual love and they share a kiss. Anna is happy to have a good relationship with Elsa once again.

==== Frozen Fever ====
Nearly a year after the events of the first movie, Elsa throws a birthday party for Anna. However, Anna discovers through Elsa's continuous sneezing that Elsa has caught a cold. Despite trying to make the party perfect for her sister to make up for all the previous ones in the past, Elsa's sneezes begin to create tiny snowmen (the snowgies), which try to take the cake for themselves, and Elsa almost falls off the clocktower due to her condition, only to be rescued by her sister. Afterwards Anna takes Elsa to rest and feeds her soup and tells her that taking care of her older sister is the “best birthday present” she ever received that day. Meanwhile, after the party, Kristoff, Sven, and Olaf help transport the snowmen to Elsa's ice palace in the mountains to live with Marshmallow.

==== Olaf's Frozen Adventure ====
In Olaf's Frozen Adventure, it is the first holiday season after the castle gates have reopened. To commemorate the occasion and "ring in the season", Anna and Elsa plan a surprise Christmas party for Arendelle's people, though the two sisters soon come to realize that their own family lacks traditions as a result of their lengthy isolation which makes Anna really upset. Olaf, meanwhile, makes it his mission to find a holiday tradition for the sisters to share. While Olaf's efforts are unsuccessful, the sisters later go through some of their old childhood possessions and realize that they did have a holiday tradition after all. Every year for Christmas, Anna would make some artwork of Olaf and slip it under Elsa's door that helped keep them connected while they were separate and Elsa would then keep it all in a box.

==== Frozen 2 ====
In the flashback sequence, some time before the first film takes place, a young Anna and Elsa listen to a bedtime story from their father, King Agnarr. Agnarr tells them their grandfather, King Runeard, established a treaty with the neighboring tribe of Northuldra by building a dam in their homeland, the Enchanted Forest thirty-four years ago. At the ceremony, a fight breaks out, resulting in Runeard's death as he falls off a cliff along with the Northuldran warrior whom he was trying to strike down. The battle enrages the elemental spirits of Earth, Air, Fire, and Water of the forest and the spirits disappear then a wall of mist descends on the Enchanted Forest, trapping everyone inside. Agnarr, though, manages to escape with the help of an unknown savior, who saves him from the war and the prince returns to Arendelle as the newest King.

Three years after the events of Frozen, Anna celebrates the arrival of autumn in the kingdom with Elsa, Olaf, Kristoff, and Sven. One night, when everyone has fallen asleep, Elsa hears and follows a mysterious voice calling out to her, and unintentionally awakens the elemental spirits. The spirits disrupts Arendelle, forcing everyone, including Anna, to evacuate. Grand Pabbie and the Trolls arrive; Pabbie tells Anna and Elsa the spirits are angry over a past event, and they must discover the truth and set things right.

Anna, Elsa, Olaf, Kristoff, and Sven later travel to the Enchanted Forest, following the mysterious voice that's calling Elsa. The Wind spirit (named Gale by Olaf), appears and sweeps everyone, including Anna, up in a vortex, the constant motion making Anna get bad motion sickness, until it's stopped by Elsa's powers, which then formed a number of ice sculptures. Anna and Elsa discover the sculptures to be images from their father's past, and that their mother Iduna was a Northuldran who saved their father's life all those years ago. Meeting the Northuldra tribe and a group of Arendellian soldiers still in conflict with one another, the group are confronted by the Fire spirit and Anna almost succumbs to smoke inhalation while trying to keep her sister safe as well as trying to be careful; only to be saved by Elsa and Kristoff. After the Fire Spirit, actually a salamander, is calmed down, Elsa confronts Anna about following her and nearly getting killed in the fire, and Anna tearfully admits that she only went in there to ensure her safety, so Elsa apologizes for worrying Anna by comforting her. Anna and Elsa explains their parentage to the Northuldra and the Arendellian soldiers when they bring out their mother's shawl during their consolation, forming a truce between them. Later, they learn of the existence of a fifth spirit that will unite the people with the magic of nature.

Anna and Elsa continue to head north with Olaf. They discover their parents' shipwreck and a map to Ahtohallan, a mythical river told by their mother to contain memories of the past. Feeling guilty of her and Anna's parents' deaths and knowing that sending both of them with her would upset the balance between both worlds, Elsa decides to travel alone and sends Anna and Olaf away, despite Anna reminding her of the warning in their mother's song and fears of losing her sister again. Arriving in a cave, Anna and Olaf receive a message about what happened in the past from Elsa who freezes in Ahtohallan's depths, which causes Olaf to fade away due to Elsa's loss in magic.

Though heartbroken by the presumed loss of her sister and best friend, Anna resolves to destroy her grandfather's dam. With help from Kristoff, Sven, and the Arendellian soldiers, she lures the giant Earth spirits to the dam, who then destroy the dam with boulders with Anna barely managing to escape the damage with Kristoff and Lieutenant Mattias’ rescue. Elsa thaws out from Anna's actions of destroying the dam and rides the Water Spirit Nokk back to Arendelle, stopping the flood of water released by the dam from destroying the kingdom. As the mist dissipates from the Enchanted Forest, Anna apologizes to Kristoff for leaving him behind but he comforts her. One of the spirits then reveals to Anna that Elsa is alive and well as they reunite and reconcile with one another. Elsa and Anna then revive Olaf and Kristoff finally works up the courage to propose to Anna, which she accepts. Elsa also explains to Anna that they are now the bridge between the people and the spirits as she puts it. Sometime later, Elsa abdicates the throne, making Anna the new Queen of Arendelle while Elsa becomes the protector of the Enchanted Forest, and regularly visits Arendelle as peace is restored in all the lands and realms.

=== Miscellaneous ===
==== Other appearances in animation ====
Although not members of the group, Anna and Elsa appear with the Disney Princesses in the 2018 film Ralph Breaks the Internet.

Anna is also one of the several characters from Walt Disney Animation Studios that appears in the 2023 short film Once Upon a Studio.

==== Merchandise ====
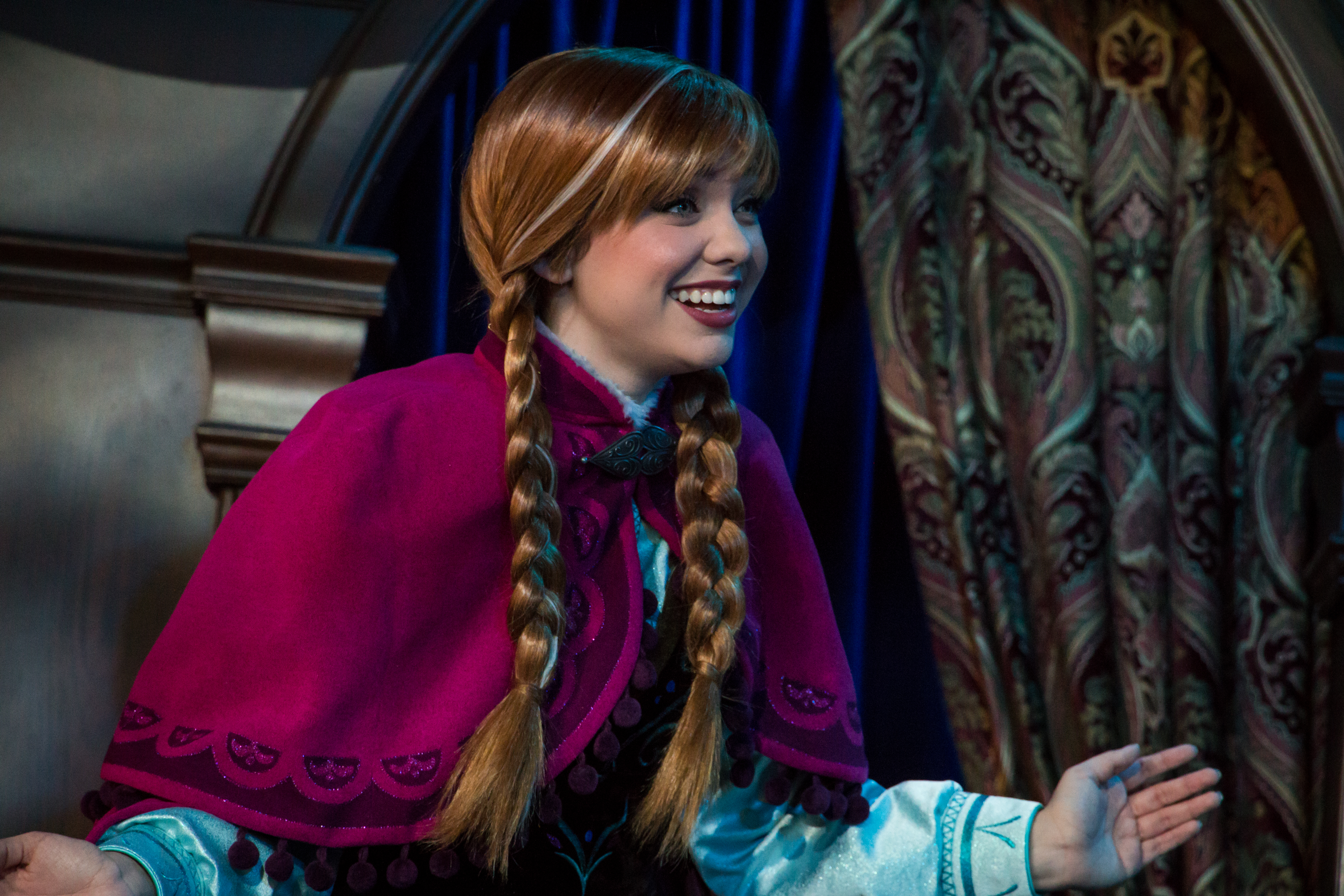
Anna in the live action Frozen at Disneyland in 2015.

On November 6, 2013, Disney Consumer Products began releasing a line of merchandise featuring Anna in Disney Store and other retailers. Various versions of Anna dolls include the fashion doll set, the mini-doll set, plush doll, Anna-as-a-toddler doll, and a special version called Musical Magic Elsa and Anna Dolls, which lights up and plays their signature songs that appear in the film when users hold their hands or they hold each other's hands. Anna's merchandise also covers a wide range of other products, such as rolling luggage, boots, clothes, nightgowns, bowls, plates, coffee mugs, and home décors. In addition, the film was adapted as simplified storybooks for children, with diverse versions featuring sound effects, original character voices, and mini projectors that project movie images on the wall. One of those books, called A Sister More Like Me, includes illustrations by Brittney Lee, the film's visual development artist. Both Anna and Elsa appear as playable characters in Disney Infinity through the use of their corresponding figurines.

==== Theme parks ====
In November 2013, prior to the release of Frozen, Anna and Elsa began daily meet-and-greet sessions at Walt Disney Parks and Resorts in Florida and California, US. In Walt Disney World, the sisters had their debut on October 22, 2013, in a temporary attraction at Disney's Hollywood Studios while their main attractions in Epcot were being built, then officially made appearances in the Norway Pavilion of Epcot on November 2, 2013, alongside a gallery of Norwegian culture which the film's setting and design drew inspirations from. A cottage called the "Royal Reception" was set up in the Fantasyland section of Disneyland, featuring the pair and an audio-animatronic Olaf speaking on the cottage roof. In February 2014, these meet-and-greet sessions were extended indefinitely, with wait time to meet the princesses frequently exceeding two hours, which is longer than any previous Disney characters. As of March 2014, it was reported that this wait time had reached four or five hours. Additionally, Elsa, Anna, and Olaf were given a Frozen-themed float for Disneyland Paris' Disney Magic on Parade. On March 9, 2014, the three made appearances again on their own Frozen parade float in Festival of Fantasy Parade at Magic Kingdom theme park, Walt Disney World, with Anna showing up in her coronation dress for the first time in a Disney park. On April 20, 2014, Anna and Elsa moved from Epcot to the Princess Fairytale Hall at Magic Kingdom, with wait time to see the characters amounted to three hours, comparing to Cinderella and Rapunzel's 15 minutes.

Anna made a few appearances in Disney California Adventure's Winter Dreams, a 30-minute, winter-themed new show of the nighttime spectacle World of Color with Olaf, the show's host, and Elsa. Disneyland Paris's nighttime spectacular Disney Dreams! featured Anna as the French co-narrator of the show, alongside the English-speaking Olaf. Scenes from the original film, featuring Anna and other characters like Olaf and Kristoff, appear on the castle while Elsa is singing "Let It Go", during the Frozen segment in the Magic Kingdom nighttime projection show, Celebrate the Magic. Coinciding with the film's release, Anna began making meet-and-greet sessions aboard the Disney Cruise Line's Disney Dream cruise ship.

On May 16, 2014, it was announced that Disneyland would debut a Frozen pre-parade featuring Anna, Elsa, and Olaf. It premiered June 13, 2014, and preceded performances of Mickey's Soundsational Parade. From July 5 to September 1, 2014, as part of 'Frozen' Summer Fun show at Disney's Hollywood Studios, Anna and Elsa will appear in a horse-drawn sleigh making their way down Hollywood Boulevard, alongside Kristoff and skaters, skiers and ice cutters in the Anna and Elsa's Royal Welcome section. The sisters also made appearances in For the First Time in Forever: A Frozen Sing-Along Celebration, where they were joined by royal historians to retell the history of Arendelle; and "Frozen" Fireworks Spectacular alongside Kristoff and Olaf, a fireworks display set to the music of Frozen. Other characters from the film will also appear in their respective offerings: Olaf in Olaf on Summer Vacation, the Oaken's family in Wandering Oaken's Trading Post & Frozen Funland, and "Coolest Summer Ever" Dance Party featuring a DJ and live band. In response to strong demand, Disney Parks subsequently announced on August 7 that Frozen Summer Fun would be extended to September 28.

On August 19, 2014, it was initially announced that Elsa & Anna's Boutique (replacing Studio Disney 365) would open mid-September in Downtown Disney at the Disneyland Resort. The opening date was later changed to October 6, 2014, and the store name was changed to "Anna & Elsa's Boutique". The location includes products inspired by Anna, Elsa, and Olaf.

While there had not been any official announcements from Disney regarding a coronation for Anna and Elsa, it had been announced in late August 2014 that a special character meal would be held by a group of travel agents in the morning of September 24, 2014. While not officially organized by Disney, the event, called My Royal Coronation, would feature the official Anna and Elsa characters owned by Disney with assistance from the company. On September 12, 2014, Walt Disney World announced that a Frozen attraction was scheduled to open in early 2016 at Epcot's World Showcase in the Norway pavilion, replacing the park's Maelstrom ride. The attraction features the kingdom of Arendelle with music and scenes from the film, as well as meet-and-greets with Anna and Elsa. Anna, Elsa, Kristoff, and Olaf will make appearances in Mickey's Once Upon a Christmastime Parade, offered during Mickey's Very Merry Christmas Party at Magic Kingdom in November and December 2014 (from November 7 to December 31).

On November 13, 2014, prior to "A Sparkling Christmas" Event, Anna and Elsa began meet-and-greet sessions at Hong Kong Disneyland.

Beginning December 20, 2014, the Anna and Elsa meet and greet at Disneyland Resort was moved from Disneyland park to a new location in the Disney Animation Building called "Anna and Elsa's Royal Welcome" in Disney California Adventure. In addition, the Storybook Land Canal Boats at Disneyland were updated to include the village of Arendelle from the film, including Anna and Elsa's castle. Officially starting January 7, 2015, Anna began making appearances alongside Elsa and Kristoff at Disney California Adventure in "For the First Time in Forever—A Frozen Sing-Along Celebration" in Hollywood Land as part of the park's "Frozen Fun" event. Also starting January 7, Anna and Elsa are making appearances in a Frozen play at the Royal Theatre in Disneyland park.

Beginning May 22, 2015, Disneyland debuted a new nighttime parade called "Paint the Night", which includes a Frozen float featuring Anna, Elsa, and Olaf, as part of the park's 60th anniversary celebration.

==== Once Upon a Time ====
A version of Anna appears in the fourth season of the ABC fantasy drama series Once Upon a Time, portrayed by Elizabeth Lail.

==== Broadway musical ====
Patti Murin originated the role of Anna in the Broadway musical, which opened in March 2018. In the musical's West End production, Stephanie McKeon originated the role of Anna and she received a nomination for the Laurence Olivier Award for Best Actress in a Musical for her performance. Laura Dawkes portrays Anna in the filmed version of the musical, which was released to Disney+ in 2025.

==== Video games ====
Anna appears in Kingdom Hearts III, with Kristen Bell reprising the role.

== Reception ==
=== Critical reviews ===
"What's so great about Frozen is that we get two strong heroines, both complex and flawed whose journeys are incredibly identifiable. Anna is plucky and socially awkward and that's great because many girls will identify with a girl who isn't necessarily naturally poised like some of the original princesses. This is a girl who hasn't had much human contact and when she does just explodes into unfiltered extroversion and naiveté."
—Sabina Ibarra, Geek Exchange film critic.

Collider.com writer Matt Goldberg referred to Anna as a character who "can go from cute to melancholy to odd to defiant and never miss a beat". Emma Koonse of Christian Post described her and Elsa as the "most lovable and charismatic characters yet", while Tony Hicks of San Jose Mercury News wrote that both Anna and Elsa were depicted as devoted from the start, and "[Anna's] confusion and Elsa's anguish as she shuts herself away from the world—and her sister—is palatable." Deepanjana Pal from First Post commented that Anna "is very much a child who needs to grow up and she does in the course of the film." The Wall Street Journal suggested that the character become more endearing for being "exactly the free spirit she seems to be". Noah Lee of The Coast News was impressed by the heroine duo Anna and Elsa, and said, "I never lost interest in the drastic measures Anna took or the tribulations Elsa faced." Travis Bean, a reviewer of Community Newspaper Group put emphasis on the lessons that kids could perceive from the film, saying, "Children can also root for Anna to race through the forest and break through Elsa's icy walls and prove that love conquers all fears." Linda Barnard, Toronto Star film critic, described the sisters as "engaging female characters", particularly praised Anna for her funny and iron-willed characteristics. Sabina Ibarra from Geek Exchange commended the directors for crafting two very real girls "who come into their own and also come together in this amazing tale."

Kristen Bell was lauded for her performance as Anna in the film. Michelle Im, writing for the Eye of the Tiger referred to the character as "bubbly and spirited", and commented, "Not only was [Bell] able to nail those vibratos and belting notes in her songs, it was actually her singing them." The Coast News review of the film wrote that Bell "earns top marks" for instilling a spirited sensibility in the clumsy but well-meaning Anna. Cinenerd, a film critic for Blogcritics, commended the actress' singing ability, stating that she and Menzel "sing their hearts out, with two showstoppers in Let it Go and For the First Time in Forever". Colin Covert of Colorado Springs' The Gazette considered Bell's performance as a "flawless delivery". Matt Goldberg extolled the relationship between Anna and her elder sister Elsa, writing, "There's so much to love about Frozen, but at the top of the list is the emphasis on [Anna] and Elsa's relationship. Anna still has an infatuation with the charming Hans and romantic chemistry with the flustered Kristoff, but her greatest love is for her sister. [Elsa] is mostly scared and guilt-ridden. She's an incredibly sympathetic character, and it's a fresh spin on depicting estrangement between siblings. Anna has so much life and enthusiasm, and we want to see her share it with Elsa." Magdalena Lachowicz of The Heights referred to this sisterly bond as "what truly makes the film and the moral that comes with it", commenting, "the plot is set up to lead the viewer into thinking that it needs to be true love's kiss—something which Anna then goes to seek. This journey sends her on a difficult adventure in which she learns about both sacrifice and love." Debbie Lynn Elias of Culver City Observer commented, "Female driven with confidence and positivity, Elsa and Anna are like two sides of a coin, both strong, albeit one through power and confidence and the other through clumsy sticktuitiveness and love," while Stephen Holden from The New York Times appreciated that instead of a romantic attachment, it was a sisterly love and devotion that drove the story, which departed greatly from traditional Disney formula. Noah Lee described Anna and Elsa's relationship as "genuine", saying, "watching those themes of family and love versus isolation and fear touched my heart in more ways than one."

However, the character was not without criticisms. Michelle Im from the Eye of the Tiger referred to Anna's falling immediately in love with a prince as the only personal development in her character, and found it "disappointing" in comparison with Elsa's emotionally evolving personality. Anna Smith of The Guardian disliked that both Anna and Elsa were drawn with slender figures and large eyes as is typical of Disney princesses.

=== Accolades ===
Both Anna and Elsa were nominated for Best Animated Female by the Alliance of Women Film Journalists, with only Anna winning the award. Frozen also won Women Film Critics Circle award in the same category.
