= Patti Murin =

American actress, singer and dancer (born 1980)

- Born: September 28, 1980 (age 45); Hopewell Junction, New York, U.S.
- Education: Syracuse University (BFA)
- Occupations: Actress; singer; dancer
- Years active: 2002–present
- Spouses: Curtis Holbrook (m. 2009; div. 2013) Colin Donnell (m. 2015)
- Children: 2
- Website: pattimurin.blog

Patti Murin (born September 28, 1980) is an American actress, singer and dancer. On Broadway, she has originated the title role in Lysistrata Jones (2011) and Princess Anna in Frozen (2018). She also had a recurring role as Dr. Nina Shore in the NBC medical drama Chicago Med from 2016 to 2019.

== Early life ==
Patti Murin was born and raised in Hopewell Junction, New York, attended John Jay High School (Hopewell Junction, New York) and graduated from Syracuse University in 2002, where she majored in musical theatre and was a member of the Syracuse Orange cheerleading squad.

== Career ==
Murin began her career in regional theatre, playing Polly Baker in Crazy for You in Ft. Lauderdale, Florida. Her Off-Broadway debut was in 2005 in the staged concert of the Elizabeth Diggs-Tom Jones-Harvey Schmidt stage musical Mirette with York Theatre Company. She next played Belle in a national tour of Beauty and the Beast (2006)

Murin made her Broadway debut in the musical Xanadu in 2007–2008 as a swing, understudy and then replacement in the leading role of Clio/Kira. In her next Broadway appearance, she originated the title role in Lysistrata Jones in 2012. Among other roles in regional and other stage productions, she played Glinda Upland in the first national tour of Wicked (2012–2013). She played pathologist Nina Shore on the NBC medical drama television series Chicago Med, which she joined in 2016 and recurred until 2019.

Murin was the original Princess Anna in the musical Frozen which opened on Broadway at the St. James Theatre in March 2018. She also performed as Anna during the workshops and 2017 out of town tryout at the Buell Theatre in Denver, Colorado. Murin played her final performance in the role on February 16, 2020.

She appears in the Hallmark Channel film Love on Iceland with her husband Colin Donnell, which aired in January 2020.

Murin released a joint album with Colin Donnell titled Something Stupid in 2022. The album, released on Broadway Records, was produced by Robbie Rozelle, co-produced by Yasuhiko Fukuoka, and arranged and orchestrated by Luke Williams.

In 2025, Murin reprised the role of Princess Anna in Frozen at the Muny in St. Louis, Missouri.

== Personal life ==
Murin's first husband was Curtis Holbrook, her co-star in the Broadway production of Xanadu from 2009 until their divorce in 2013. On June 19, 2015, Murin married her Love's Labour's Lost co-star Colin Donnell in New York City. Their daughter, Cecily, was born on July 14, 2020. In October 2022, the couple announced that Murin was pregnant with their second child. Their second daughter, Lorelai, was born on April 2, 2023.

== Credits ==
=== Television ===
Year	Title	Role	Notes
2012	Before We Made It	Anna	Television film
2012–2016	Royal Pains	Ana / Ava	Guest role; 2 episodes
2016–2019	Chicago Med	Dr. Nina Shore	Recurring role; 18 episodes
2018	Chicago Fire	Dr. Nina Shore	Episode: "This Isn't Charity"
2019	Holiday for Heroes	Pam	Television film
2020	Love on Iceland	Isabella	Television film
2021	To Catch a Spy	Sara Webb	Television film
2022	In Merry Measure	Darcy	Television film
2023	Mystic Christmas	Candice Adams	Television film
2025	Holiday Touchdown: A Bills Love Story	Cathy	Television film

=== Theatre ===
Year(s)	Production	Role	Location	Category
2002	Crazy for You	Polly Baker	Broward Stage Door Theatre	Regional
2003	How to Succeed in Business Without Really Trying	Rosemary Pilkington	Broward Stage Door Theatre	Regional
2003	Parade	Mrs. Frances Phagan	Broward Stage Door Theatre	Regional
2004	Annie Get Your Gun	Annie Oakley	Broward Stage Door Theatre	Regional
2005	Princesses	Tam / Annabelle	5th Avenue Theatre	Out of town tryout
2005	Mirette	Ensemble	York Theatre Company	Off-Broadway
2006	Beauty and the Beast	Belle	Various	American Tour
2007	Xanadu	Swing (u/s Clio / Kira)	Helen Hayes Theatre	Broadway
2007	Xanadu	Euterpe, Siren, '40s Singer, Thetis (Replacement)	Helen Hayes Theatre	Broadway
2007	Xanadu	Dance Captain (Replacement)	Helen Hayes Theatre	Broadway
2010	Give It Up!	Lysistrata Jones	Dallas Theater Center	Regional
2011	Lysistrata Jones	Lysistrata Jones	Transport Group Theatre Company	Off-Broadway
2011	The Little Mermaid	Ariel	The Muny	Regional
2011	Lysistrata Jones	Lysistrata Jones	Walter Kerr Theatre	Broadway
2012–13	Wicked	Glinda Upland (Replacement)	Various	First National Tour
2013	Love's Labour's Lost	Princess	Delacorte Theater	Shakespeare in the Park
2014	Fly By Night	Daphne	Playwrights Horizons	Off-Broadway
2014	Holiday Inn	Linda Mason	Goodspeed Opera House	Regional
2015	Lady, Be Good	Susie Trevor	New York City Center	Encores!
2015	Holiday Inn	Linda Mason	The Muny	Regional
2016	Nerds	Sally	Longacre Theatre	Broadway (cancelled)
2017	Frozen	Princess Anna	Buell Theatre	Out of town tryout
2018–2020	Frozen	Princess Anna	St. James Theatre	Broadway
2022	Legally Blonde	Paulette	The Muny	Regional
2023	Into the Woods	The Baker's Wife	Benedum Theatre	Regional
2023	Little Shop of Horrors	Audrey	The Muny	Regional
2023	Gutenberg! The Musical!	The Producer (One night cameo)	James Earl Jones Theatre	Broadway
2024	The Ballad of Johnny and June	June Carter Cash	The La Jolla Playhouse	Regional
2025	Frozen	Princess Anna	The Muny	Regional
2026	The 25th Annual Putnam County Spelling Bee	Speller (One night cameo)	New World Stages	Off-Broadway

== Awards and nominations ==
Year	Award Ceremony	Category	Nominee	Result
2012	Fred and Adele Astaire Awards	Outstanding Female Dancer in a Broadway Show	Lysistrata Jones	Nominated
2018	Drama League Award	Distinguished Performance	Frozen	Nominated
2018	Outer Critics Circle Award	Outstanding Actress in a Musical	Frozen	Nominated
