= Siberia and Him =

2019 film by Viatcheslav Kopturevskiy

- Theatrical release poster
- Russian: Сибирь и он
- Directed by: Viatcheslav Kopturevskiy
- Written by: Viatcheslav Kopturevskiy
- Produced by: Viatcheslav Kopturevskiy; Anna Elnikova; Mor Shamay
- Starring: Viatcheslav Kopturevskiy; Ilya Shubochkin; Anastasia Voskresenskaya; Irina Novokreshennuh
- Cinematography: Wayland Bell
- Edited by: Viatcheslav Kopturevskiy
- Music by: Yasuhiko Fukuoka
- Production company: VK Films Inc.
- Distributed by: TLA Releasing
- Release dates: October 27, 2019 (NewFest); October 27, 2019 (United States)
- Running time: 77 minutes
- Countries: United States, Russia
- Language: Russian

Siberia and Him (Russian: Сибирь и он, romanized: Sibir i on) is a Russian-language gay-themed film written, directed, edited, produced by and starring Viatcheslav Kopturevskiy. It is his feature-length film debut. Siberia and Him premiered at the 2019 NewFest film festival.

== Plot ==
Dima, a policeman, and Sasha, a farm-hand, both live in a run-down town in Siberia where the local police make guerrilla-like raids against the local gay scene. The movie begins by showing Sasha attempting to commit suicide by hanging himself, which he fails to do successfully. Sasha is involved with Dima, his brother-in-law, in a secret relationship, which creates a secret tension between the two characters in their small town. When Sasha fails to contact his grandmother in a far-away village, Dima accompanies him on a days-long trek to see to Sasha's grandmother's well-being. During their days-long journey, much naturalistic cinematography is used to evoke the Siberian countryside. They reach their destination and see to Sasha's grandmother's well-being. Afterwards, Sasha and Dima during their return trek have a fight where Dima kills Sasha. Dima returns to his native village and eventually commits suicide.

== Cast ==
- Viatcheslav Kopturevsky as Sasha
- Ilya Shubochkin as Dima
- Anastasia Voskresenskaya as Anna
- Irina Novokreshennuh as Mother

== Critical reception ==
The few independent critical reviews of the film have been generally positive. Jennie Kermode, in her 3.5 star (out of 5) review, writing for the website Eye for Film states "Stunningly beautiful cinematography dominates a film in which the dialogue is sparse...(Kopturevskiy's) style is observational, quiet, but the emotion we see is raw". Roger Walker-Dack, writing for Queerguru.com calls the film "an excellent, heart-wrenching drama". In the official write-up for the film on NewFest's website, the film is described as being an "auspicious debut drama...an elliptical and much-needed examination of internalized homophobia, repression, and identity in a remote Siberian town".
