= Colin Donnell =

American actor and singer (born 1982)

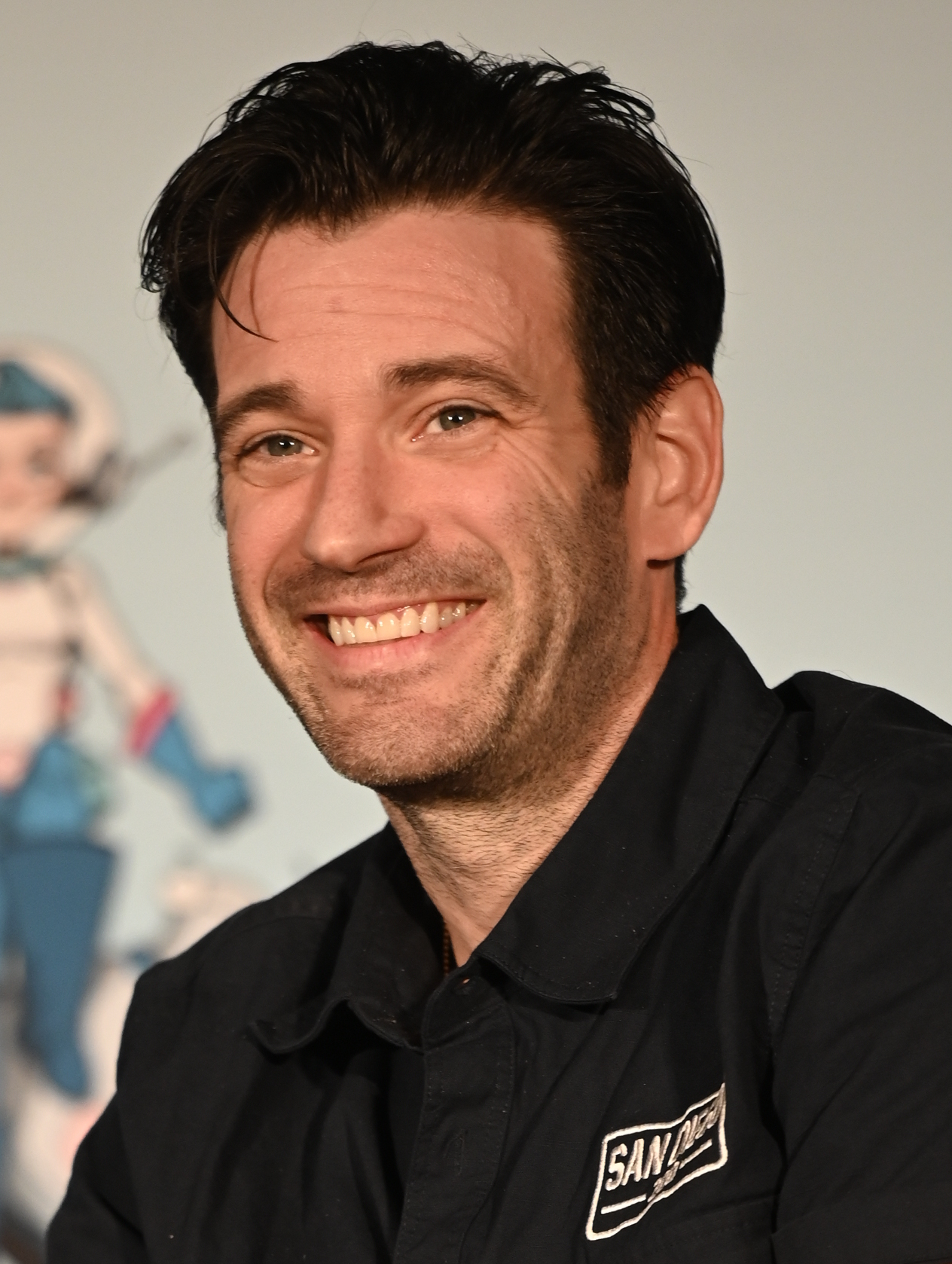
- Donnell at GalaxyCon Richmond in 2023
- Born: October 9, 1982 (age 44); St. Louis, Missouri, U.S.
- Education: Indiana University Bloomington
- Occupations: Actor, singer
- Years active: 2005–present
- Spouse: Patti Murin (m. 2015)
- Children: 2

Colin Donnell (born October 9, 1982) is an American actor and singer known as Tommy Merlyn on Arrow, Scotty Lockhart on The Affair, and Dr. Connor Rhodes on Chicago Med (2015–19). He also starred in Irreverent. On Broadway, he's portrayed Billy Crocker in Anything Goes, Monty in Violet, and the Father in Ragtime.

== Early life and education ==
Colin Donnell was born in St. Louis, Missouri, as the youngest of three boys. He has Irish and French ancestry. He played the guitar and took singing lessons when he was 17. His introduction to the stage was at Kirkwood High School. He was a part of the choir and was in the background juggling and doing circus tricks, which led to being part of his first school musical production of Barnum. Donnell graduated from Indiana University Bloomington in 2005.

== Career ==
Donnell has been part of many national stage tours, such as Mamma Mia! and Wicked. His first Broadway Theatre performance was in Jersey Boys as Hank Mejewski. His other stage credits include Follies, Meet Me in St. Louis, Johnny Baseball and many more. He played Billy Crocker in the 2011 Broadway revival of Anything Goes and was nominated for a Drama Desk Award for Outstanding Actor in a Musical, an Outer Critics Circle Award for Outstanding Featured Actor in a Musical, and an Astaire Award for Outstanding Male Dancer.

Donnell made his television debut by playing Mike Ruskin in the television series Pan Am. In 2012, Donnell was cast as Tommy Merlyn in television series Arrow, where he is a series regular in the first season and made occasional appearances in later seasons, including the final season.

In July and August 2013, Donnell starred as Berowne in the musical adaptation of Shakespeare's Love's Labour's Lost. He also appeared as Elizabeth Banks' husband in the crime thriller Every Secret Thing, which was released on May 15, 2015.

In January 2014, Donnell was cast as Monty in the 1960s-era Broadway musical Violet alongside Sutton Foster and Joshua Henry; previews began on March 28, and the show officially opened on April 20. In July, Donnell was cast to play Joshua Jackson's brother in Showtime original drama The Affair.

In 2015, he performed in the New York City Center Encores! production of the musical Lady, Be Good, alongside Tommy Tune, Erin Mackey and Patti Murin.

In March 2015, Donnell starred in Love Is A Four Letter Word, a pilot for NBC in which he played Sean, an ad agency partner; the show was not picked up to series. Donnell then landed a regular role in the NBC series, Chicago Med, playing a doctor in trauma surgery. On April 19, 2019, it was announced that Donnell was leaving the series after four seasons as a series regular.

A special Encores! Off-Center staged concert of Songs for a New World was performed at New York City Center June 27 through June 30, 2018. The production was directed by Kate Whoriskey and starred Shoshana Bean, Colin Donnell, Mykal Kilgore, and Solea Pfeiffer.

In 2022, Donnell and Patti Murin released a joint album titled "Something Stupid" on Broadway Records. The album was produced by Robbie Rozelle and co-produced by Yasuhiko Fukuoka. Luke Williams was the arranger and orchestrator. The album features a cross section of pop, Broadway, and Disney songs.

In 2024, Donnell was cast in the guest role of Brian Lange in CBS television series FBI: International for the final two episodes of the show's third season. In November of that same year, he starred as the Father in New York City Center's Encores! production of Ragtime opposite Joshua Henry, Caissie Levy and Brandon Uranowitz. He reprised the role for its 2025 Broadway transfer.

== Personal life ==
Donnell began dating actress Patti Murin in 2013 after they co-starred in a Shakespeare in the Park musical adaptation of Love's Labour's Lost. They became engaged in December 2014, and married on June 19, 2015, in New York City. Their first child, Cecily, was born on July 14, 2020. In October 2022, the couple announced that Murin was pregnant with their second child. Their second child, Lorelai, was born on April 2, 2023.

Donnell is a literary aficionado and a musician. He has two tattoos from his tour trips – one from Memphis and one from Dayton; which are five silhouettes of birds to represent his family, and a Fleur De Lis, because his mother is French.

== Filmography ==
=== Film ===
Year	Title	Role	Notes
2014	Every Secret Thing	Paul Porter	
2019	Almost Love	Henry	

=== Television ===
Year	Title	Role	Notes
2011–2012	Pan Am	Mike Ruskin	Guest
2012–2020	Arrow	Tommy Merlyn / Dark Archer / Prometheus; Christopher Chance / Human Target	Main role (season 1); Guest (seasons 2, 3, 6 & 8)
2014	Person of Interest	Billy Parsons	Episode: "Root Path"
2014	Unforgettable	Agent Stone	Episode: "Flesh and Blood"
2014	The Mysteries of Laura	Daniel Mikorski	Episode: "The Mystery of the Dysfunctional Dynasty"
2014–2015	The Affair	Scott Lockhart	Recurring role
2015	Love Is a Four Letter Word	Sean	Unsold television pilot
2015–2019 - 2026 & 2027	Chicago Med	Dr. Connor Rhodes	Main role; (seasons 1–5) Guest season 12)
2016–2019	Chicago Fire	Dr. Connor Rhodes	Guest
2016–2019	Chicago P.D.	Dr. Connor Rhodes	Guest
2020	Love on Iceland	Charlie	Television film
2021	To Catch a Spy	Aaron Maxwell	Television film
2022	Irreverent	Paulo	Main role
2024	FBI: International	Brian Lange	2 episodes
2025	Zero Day	Erik Hayes	

== Theater ==
Year	Title	Role	Theatre	Notes
2001	Miss Saigon	Ensemble	The Muny, Regional	
2003	Mamma Mia!	Ensemble	US Tour	
2005	Almost Heaven	Male role	Promenade Theatre, Off Broadway	
2005	Mame	Older Patrick	The Muny, Regional	
2006	Jesus Christ Superstar	Peter u/s Jesus	North Shore Music Theatre, Regional	
2006–2007	Meet Me in St. Louis	John Truitt	Irish Repertory Theatre, Off Broadway	
2007	Follies	Young Benjamin Stone	New York City Center, Encores!	
2007	Jersey Boys	Hank Mejewski u/s Bob & Nick	August Wilson Theatre, Broadway	Replacement
2008	Me, Myself and I	Otto	McCarter Theatre, Regional	
2008	High School Musical	Troy Bolton	The Muny, Regional	
2008	Fiddler on the Roof	Perchik	The Muny, Regional	
2009–2010	Wicked	Fiyero	Second National Tour	
2010	Johnny Baseball	Johnny O'Brian	American Repertory Theater, Regional	
2011–2012	Anything Goes	Billy Crocker	Stephen Sondheim Theatre, Broadway	
2012	Merrily We Roll Along	Franklin Shepard	New York City Center, Encores!	
2013	Love's Labour's Lost	Berowne	Delacorte Theater, Off Broadway	
2014	Violet	Monty	American Airlines Theatre, Broadway	
2015	Lady, Be Good	Jack Robinson	New York City Center, Encores!	
2015	Holiday Inn	Jim Hardy	The Muny, Regional	
2018	Songs for a New World	Man 2	New York City Center, Encores!	
2019	Almost Famous	Russell Hammond	Old Globe Theatre, Regional	
2023	The Shark Is Broken	Roy Scheider	John Golden Theatre, Broadway	
2024	Ragtime	Father	New York City Center, Encores	
2025–2026	Ragtime	Father	Vivian Beaumont Theatre, Broadway	
