= Monster (Disney song) =

Song from the 2018 Broadway musical Frozen

Single by Caissie Levy, John Riddle and Original Broadway Cast of Frozen

from the album Frozen: The Broadway Musical (Original Broadway Cast Recording)
- Published: Wonderland Music Company
- Length: 3:42
- Label: Walt Disney
- Songwriters: Kristen Anderson-Lopez; Robert Lopez
- Producers: Kristen Anderson-Lopez; Robert Lopez; Chris Montan

"Monster" is a song from the 2018 Broadway musical Frozen, an adaptation of the 2013 Disney's computer-animated musical film of the same name. Sung by Elsa, the song takes place during the second act. The song was written by Kristen Anderson-Lopez and Robert Lopez. The scene takes place after Elsa strikes Anna with her powers and starts questioning her own mortality, then Hans and his men come to capture Elsa in her ice palace.

== Composition ==
"Monster" is written in D minor and vocals span from A3 to Eb5. The song contains an allusion to Dies Irae.

== Release ==
The song was released on YouTube Vevo with a music video the same day the show opened on Broadway. This track was performed at New York City's Gotham Hall, and is the first of four original songs from the musical to be released weekly through the Disney on Broadway channel (the Anna and Kristof duet "What Do You Know About Love?", the Elsa solo "Dangerous to Dream", and the Anna solo "True Love").

== Context ==
The soliloquy ballad sees Elsa ask herself if she is evil due to her magical abilities, and wonders if the world would be better without her. She first attempts this by running away to a far-off place and building an ice palace ("Let It Go"). When a winter is triggered regardless, she considers more extreme measures.

This song takes place after Elsa has just thrown Anna and Kristoff out of the ice palace, as Hans and his men from Arendelle arrive to capture her. She thinks about the damage she has caused, while she is buried under her self-doubt, fear, and uncertainty.

== Critical reception ==
The Telegraph felt that the song "allows the audience to better understand her motivations" at this point in the story. Mashable deemed the piece an "earworm", while Digital Spy described the song as "pure Elsa".
