= Stephanie McKeon =

Irish actress

- Born: Stephanie Adrienne McKeon; 9 June 1987 (age 39)
- Education: Trinity College Dublin
- Occupation: Actress
- Years active: 2004–present
- Spouse: Kyle Riabko (m. 2017)
- Children: 1

Stephanie Adrienne McKeon (born 9 June 1987) is an Irish actress. She began her career as a teenager in the RTÉ soap opera Fair City (2004–2007). She was nominated for Laurence Olivier and WhatsOnStage Awards for her role as Anna in the West End production of Frozen.

== Early life ==
McKeon grew up in a theatre family in Artane, North Dublin. She has a sister.

McKeon attended Belgrove Girls' School in Clontarf, where she discovered acting through a school production of Bugsy Malone when she was seven. She took drama classes at the First Active Children's Theatre (FACT) and Barry Billie Stage School. She studied Drama and Theatre at Trinity College Dublin, graduating in 2009.

== Career ==
When she was a teenager, McKeon played Aisling O'Brien in the RTÉ soap opera Fair City from 2004 to 2007.

After graduating from Trinity, McKeon went into theatre. She starred as Dorothy in Sean Gilligan's The Wizard of Oz. In 2012, she played Cinderella in the Gaiety Theatre's Christmas pantomime as well as Philomena O'Shea in the Improbable Frequency revival. She also appeared in The Life and Sort of Death of Eric Argyle at the Pleasance Dome in Edinburgh and Anglo: The Musical at the Olympia Theatre.

McKeon then relocated to London when she was cast as Natalie in The Commitments at the Palace Theatre, originating the role and marking her West End debut in 2013. She was then a lead vocalist in Kyle Riabko's Bacharach Reimagined shows in 2015; What's It All About? was put on at the Menier Chocolate Factory. It was reimagined as Close to You when it moved to the Criterion Theatre. She took over the role of Cynthia Weil in Beautiful: The Carole King Musical for its final ten weeks at the Aldwych Theatre in 2017.

In 2019, McKeon was cast as Princess Anna opposite Samantha Barks as Elsa in the West End run of the stage adaptation of Disney's Frozen. After being delayed due to the COVID-19 pandemic, the show opened in 2021 at the Theatre Royal, Drury Lane. For her performance, McKeon was nominated for both the WhatsOnStage Award and the Laurence Olivier Award for Best Actress in a Musical. McKeon released an EP Here I Go (2021) consisting of musical theatre covers.

== Personal life ==
McKeon married Kyle Riabko in December 2017, having met through Bacharach Reimagined. In February 2023, the couple announced they were expecting their first child. Their son was born that July.

== Filmography ==
Year	Title	Role	Notes
2004–2007	Fair City	Aisling O'Brien	17 episodes
2014	Ant & Dec's Saturday Night Takeaway	Natalie	Children in Need special
2018	Once Upon a Coma	Soyler	Video game
2019	Neon Genesis Evangelion: Death & Rebirth	Asuka Langley Soryu	English dub
2019	Neon Genesis Evangelion: Death & Rebirth	Asuka Langley Soryu	The End of Evangelion
2024	Wuthering Waves	Shorekeeper	Video Game (English Voice)

== Stage ==
Year	Title	Role	Notes
2011	The Wizard of Oz	Dorothy	The Helix, Dublin
2012	Improbable Frequency	Philomena O'Shea	Gaiety Theatre, Dublin
2012	The Life and Sort of Death of Eric Argyle	Gillian	Pleasance Dome, Edinburgh
2012	Cinderella	Cinderella	Gaiety Theatre, Dublin
2012	Anglo: The Musical	Aisling	Olympia Theatre, Dublin
2013	The Commitments	Natalie	Palace Theatre, London
2015	What's It All About? Bacharach Reimagined	Vocalist	Menier Chocolate Factory, London
2015	Close to You: Bacharach Reimagined	Vocalist	Criterion Theatre, London
2017	Jacques Brel is Alive and Well and Living in Paris	Woman	Gate Theatre, Dublin
2017	Beautiful: The Carole King Musical	Cynthia Weil	Aldwych Theatre, London
2021	Frozen	Princess Anna	Theatre Royal, Drury Lane

== Awards and nominations ==
Year	Award	Category	Work	Result	Ref.
2022	WhatsOnStage Awards	Best Actress in a Musical	Frozen	Nominated	
2022	Laurence Olivier Awards	Best Actress in a Musical	Frozen	Nominated	
