= Viatcheslav Kopturevskiy =

Screenwriter, producer and director

Viatcheslav Kopturevskiy (Russian: Вячеслав Коптуревский) is a screenwriter, producer and film director.

His films include the short films The Prettiest Lora and Coney Island Queen, and the full-length feature film Siberia and Him.

== Siberia and Him ==
Siberia and Him (Russian: Сибирь и он), Kopturevskiy's debut feature-length film, is a gay-themed film that made its world premiere at NewFest 2019. Kopturevskiy wrote, directed, produced, and starred in the film. A few independent critical reviews have given the film generally positive reviews. Jennie Kermode, in her 3.5 star (out of 5) review, writing for the website Eye for Film states "Stunningly beautiful cinematography dominates a film in which the dialogue is sparse...(Kopturevskiy's) style is observational, quiet, but the emotion we see is raw". Roger Walker-Dack, writing for Queerguru.com calls the film "an excellent, heart-wrenching drama". In the official write-up for the film on NewFest's website, the film is described as being an "auspicious debut drama...an elliptical and much-needed examination of internalized homophobia, repression, and identity in a remote Siberian town".
