= Emil Dale Academy =

Musical theatre school in England

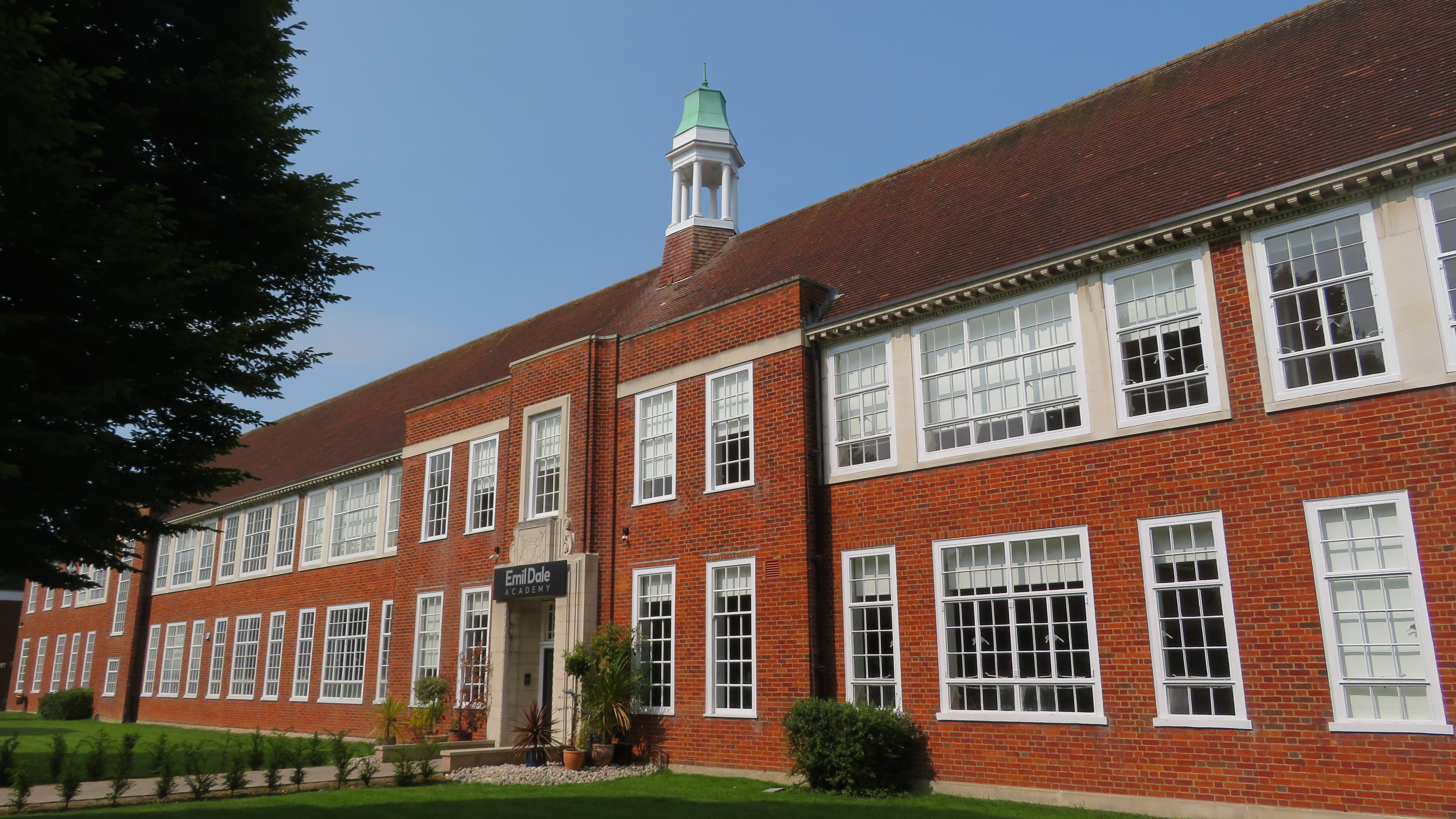
- Letchworth campus (Old Grammar School)
- Established: 2009
- Academic affiliations: University of Bedfordshire; The Knights Templar School
- Students: 270 (full-time); 400 (part-time)
- Location: The Old Grammar School, Broadway, Letchworth Garden City, Hertfordshire SG6 3PA, England
- Nickname: EDA
- Website: emildale.co.uk

Emil Dale Academy is a musical theatre school founded in Hitchin, Hertfordshire before relocating to Letchworth in 2024. The Hertfordshire school offers a Bachelor of Arts degree awarded by the University of Bedfordshire, BTEC Level 3 diploma, and foundation and sixth form courses for full-time students (16+). Weekend classes for part-time students (3–21) are also held.

In 2014, a second campus opened in Cambridge under the name Emil Dale's School of Performing Arts, which ran part-time and weekend programmes until closing in 2023.

The Stage called Emil Dale one of the fastest-growing musical theatre schools in the country in 2016. The school is affiliated with Dale Hammond Associates.

== History ==
The school's namesake Emil Dale, a graduate of London's ArtsEd from Biggleswade, began hosting a musical theatre Sunday school with co-founder Victoria Hammond when he was 23 with the idea of inviting West End professionals to guest teach classes at a more affordable rate than other programmes of its kind. They started off with 22 students in the school hall of St Andrews' Church of England Primary School in Benslow.

The Cambridge branch, affiliated with North Cambridge Academy, began in 2014.

An official Hitchin campus was established at the site of a former factory on Wilbury Road converted into studios in 2014 and a 200-seat theatre, known as the Factory Playhouse Theatre, in 2015. West Side Story was the venue's inaugural performance.

In 2018, the Bachelor of Arts (BA) in Musical Theatre path was introduced in a partnership with the University of Bedfordshire.

A new campus at the site of a former grammar school on Broadway in Letchworth opened its doors in 2024, moving the theatre school up the road from Hitchin.

== Productions ==
The school has their own 200 seat theatre, known as Factory Playhouse. First opened in May 2015, they have since productions numerous theatre productions involving the students of the academy, as well as professional productions.

== Notable Alumni ==
- Laura Dawkes
- Elijah Holloway
- Bradley Riches
- Taila Halford
- Harry Acklowe
- Billie Kerr
- Georgina Onuorah
- Leesa Tulley
- Gerardine Sacdalan
- Izi Maxwell
- Verity Thompson
- Nethra Tilakumara
