= Frozen (musical) =

Stage adaptation of the 2013 Disney film Frozen

- The Broadway Musical
- Broadway promotional poster
- Music: Kristen Anderson-Lopez; Robert Lopez
- Lyrics: Kristen Anderson-Lopez; Robert Lopez
- Book: Jennifer Lee
- Basis: Frozen by: Chris Buck; Jennifer Lee; Shane Morris
- Productions: 2017 Denver (tryout); 2018 Broadway; 2019 North American tour; 2021 West End

Frozen is a musical with music and lyrics by Kristen Anderson-Lopez and Robert Lopez, and book by Jennifer Lee, based on Walt Disney Animation Studios' 2013 animated film Frozen. The story centers on the relationship between two sisters who are princesses, Elsa and Anna. Elsa has magical powers to create snow and ice, which she does not know how to control. After inheriting the throne, Elsa flees, inadvertently causes the kingdom to become frozen in an eternal winter, and nearly kills her sister. She must sacrifice and show true love to save the day.

Produced by Disney Theatrical Productions, the musical had a tryout at the Buell Theatre in Denver, Colorado in August 2017 and premiered on Broadway in March 2018 at the St. James Theatre to mixed reviews. Due to the COVID-19 pandemic, the Broadway production closed on March 11, 2020, after 26 previews and 825 regular performances. A North American tour began in 2019 and closed in 2024. International productions followed, including a West End production that opened in September 2021 and closed in September 2024.

== Development ==
In January 2014, Bob Iger, CEO of The Walt Disney Company, stated that Disney Theatrical Productions was in early development of a stage adaptation of Frozen that it planned to bring to Broadway. No date was set for the adaptation. "We're not demanding speed," Iger said. "We're demanding excellence." One of the film's producers, Peter Del Vecho, later reiterated that "these things take time." In an October 2014 interview, Thomas Schumacher, the president of Disney Theatrical Group, disclosed that discussions about a musical had begun even before the film was released almost a year earlier. He stated: "I'm already talking to directors, and I have a design concept, and we have to begin to fashion this idea. It doesn't need to be fast. It needs to be great."

The first priority [for Disney Theatrical] ... is when you have a property that is as beloved and music-based as Frozen, that has to get an enormous amount of my attention. To say, "How do we take this and make a sophisticated, adult evening of theater out of it?"

— Tom Schumacher, interview with Southern California Public Radio in November 2014

In February 2015, Schumacher confirmed that the songwriters were working on the show and that Lee would be writing the book. In early 2016, Disney announced that the musical was scheduled to open on Broadway in spring 2018, with Alex Timbers as director, Peter Darling as choreographer and Stephen Oremus as music supervisor, among other creative staff. In the meantime, Disney produced a musical stage show based on the film, Frozen – Live at the Hyperion, at Disney California Adventure and another on its Disney Cruise Line.

Disney scheduled the pre-Broadway tryout in August 2017 at the Denver Center for the Performing Arts. In April 2016, it was reported that Betsy Wolfe had been chosen as Elsa, but Disney stated that no roles had been officially cast. Kristen Anderson-Lopez told an interviewer that while "the movie only has seven-and-a-half songs ... we've written about 23" for the musical". The musical's first developmental lab was held over two weeks during May 2016 in New York City, with Wolfe as Elsa, Patti Murin as Anna, Okieriete Onaodowan as Kristoff, and Greg Hildreth as Olaf.

By September 2016, Disney chose a new director, Michael Grandage. It confirmed that the musical was set to open on Broadway at the St. James Theatre in spring 2018. Rob Ashford joined the creative team as choreographer. The musical "cost a reported $30 million to produce [and] churned through three choreographers, two set designers, two Elsas and two directors."

== Productions ==
=== Denver, United States (2017) ===
A pre-Broadway tryout ran at the Buell Theatre in Denver, Colorado, from August 17 to October 1, 2017, directed and choreographed by Grandage and Ashford. Caissie Levy and Patti Murin starred as Elsa and Anna. The cast included Jelani Alladin as Kristoff, Greg Hildreth as Olaf and John Riddle as Prince Hans. Designers included Christopher Oram (sets and costumes), Natasha Katz (lighting) and Michael Curry (puppets). Stephen Oremus served as music supervisor.

=== Broadway (2018–20) ===
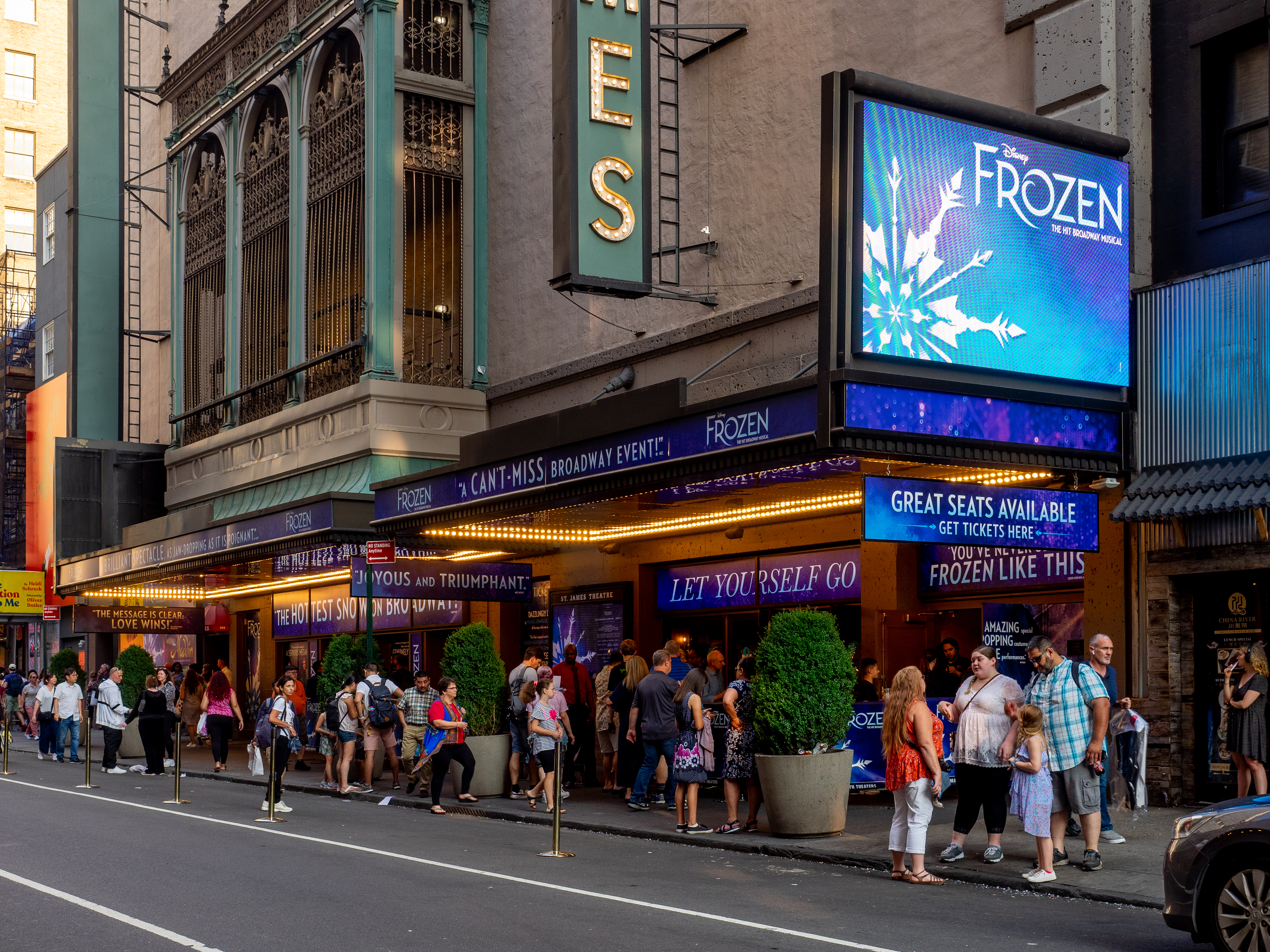
At the St. James Theatre

Previews on Broadway at the St. James Theatre began on February 22, 2018, with an official opening on March 22, 2018. The cast and creative team was the same as in Denver. A reported 30% of the show was rewritten between the tryout and the Broadway opening, with the musical taking a "deeper dive into the princesses' psyches" and aiming at a more adult audience; Disney research shows that 70% of the audience for its musicals are adults without children. Anderson-Lopez noted that "examining how the ... princesses' psychological scars drive them to make certain decisions was the next logical storytelling step." The onstage technology included lighting effects for Elsa's magic, as well as such adaptations as a full-body costume to represent the reindeer Sven, with a ballet dancer inside holding stilts in his hands and walking on tiptoe; the role is so strenuous that a second ballet dancer was hired to play it at some performances to give each dancer some days of rest.

The production played 825 performances and 26 previews at the St. James Theatre, ending on March 11, 2020, when performances were suspended due to the COVID-19 pandemic. The closing cast included Ciara Renée as Elsa, McKenzie Kurtz as Anna, Ryan McCartan as Hans and Ryann Redmond as Olaf. The production cost about $35 million to mount, attracted attendance of over 1.3 million and grossed over $150 million, often grossing 80% to 90% of box office potential. It did not perform as well, however, as Disney's The Lion King or Aladdin. Therefore, Disney chose not to reopen Frozen, judging that after the pandemic running three of their shows on Broadway simultaneously "would become untenable".

=== North American tour (2019–2024) ===
A North American tour began on November 10, 2019, at Proctor's Theatre in Schenectady, New York, starring Caroline Bowman as Elsa and Caroline Innerbichler as Anna. It was also suspended due to the COVID-19 pandemic. Performances resumed on September 9, 2021 at Shea's Performing Arts Center in Buffalo, New York. During 2022, Kurtz and McCartan joined the tour to reprise their Broadway roles of Anna and Hans. It closed at the San Jose Center for the Performing Arts on September 1, 2024, having played 1,225 performances in 62 cities.

=== Australia and Singapore (2020–23) ===
An Australian production began previews on December 1, 2020, at Sydney Australia's Capitol Theatre, with Jemma Rix as Elsa, Courtney Monsma as Anna and Matt Lee as Olaf. Following an outbreak of COVID-19 in New South Wales, performances of the production were suspended from 21 December 2020 but resumed on 26 December. The run closed on May 23, 2021.

The production moved to Melbourne's Her Majesty's Theatre in previews on June 25, 2021, with the same cast, opening on July 14, 2021, and closing on January 26, 2022 after some performances were cancelled due to the pandemic. It transferred to Brisbane's Queensland Performing Arts Centre on February 10, 2022 and closed on May 8. It then played at the Adelaide Festival Centre beginning on May 26. The final stop of the Australian tour was Perth, where the show opened at Crown Theatre on August 25, 2022, and closed on November 13, 2022.

A limited run of the Australian production played from February 5 to March 19, 2023, at the Sands Theatre in Marina Bay Sands, Singapore. Rix and Lee reprised their roles as Elsa and Olaf, respectively.

=== Japan (2021–present) ===
Shiki Theatre Company produced the musical at the Haru Theater in Tokyo owned by Shiki. After a postponement due to COVID-19, it opened on June 24, 2021.

=== West End (2021–2024) ===
After delays due to the COVID-19 pandemic, the show began previews on August 27, 2021, at the Theatre Royal, Drury Lane, in London's West End, and opened officially on September 8. It was again directed by Grandage, with choreography by Ashford, and starred Samantha Barks as Elsa and Stephanie McKeon as Anna; set and costume design were by Christopher Oram, with lighting design by Neil Austin. The production was nominated for four Olivier Awards, including Best New Musical and Best Actress in a Musical for McKeon. On February 8, 2024, it celebrated its 1,000th performance. By January 2024, more than 2.8 million people had seen Frozen in London. The production ran until its third anniversary, September 8, 2024. Laura Dawkes played Anna from 27 September 2023 to the closing. A film of the production was released on Disney+ on June 20, 2025, starring Barks and Dawkes.

=== Germany (2021–present) ===
A German production titled Die Eiskönigin opened in November 2021 at the Stage Theater an der Elbe in Hamburg, in German, with Sabrina Weckerlin as Elsa and Celena Pieper as Anna. The production was produced by Stage Entertainment. On October 18, 2023, Willemijn Verkaik, who provided the singing voice of Elsa in the German and Dutch versions of the films, took over the role of Elsa. It closed on September 29, 2024.

On November 26, 2024, the production transferred to the Apollo Theatre in Stuttgart.

=== Nordic productions ===
A series of five Nordic productions of the musical are planned to be directed by Icelandic film director Gísli Örn Garðarsson, who was given the task of making them "more Nordic" in terms of story, music, and culture. The shows are being produced by Icelandic theatre group Vesturport in collaboration with theatres in the capital cities of the five Nordic countries: Det Norske Teatret in Oslo, Þjóðleikhúsið in Reykjavík, Stockholm's stadsteater, Helsinki's Kaupunginteatteri, and Falkonersalen in Copenhagen.

The Norwegian production ran from October 14, 2023 to April 30, 2024, with Mimmi Tamba as Elsa and Ina Svenningdal as Anna; and the Icelandic production opened on March 2, 2024, with Hildur Vala Baldursdóttir as Elsa and Vala Kristín Eiríksdóttir as Anna. The Danish production is set to premiere on February 12, 2026, with Maria Lucia Rosenberg and Kristine Yde Eriksen, original Danish dubbers of Elsa and Anna respectively, reprising their roles. All of the productions have been titled Frost.

=== Netherlands (2024–2026) ===
A Dutch production opened at the Circustheater in The Hague on June 9, 2024, with Nienke Latten as Anna, Vajèn van den Bosch as Elsa, Naidjim Severina as Kristoff, Tristan van der Lingen as Hans, Steven Roox as Olaf, Jorge Verkroost as the Duke of Weselton and Mathijs Pater & Nicholas Li as Sven. It is produced by Stage Entertainment. The production closed on January 4, 2026.

=== South Korea (2026–present) ===
A Korean-language production opened on August 13, 2026, at the Charlotte Theater in Seoul.

== Plot ==
=== Act I ===
A Greek chorus introduces Princess Elsa of Arendelle, and her playful younger sister, Princess Anna ("Vuelie", "Let the Sun Shine On"). While the family knows about Elsa's magic, it is kept a secret from the people of Arendelle. One night at bedtime, Elsa and Anna build a magical snowman and name it Olaf ("A Little Bit of You"); Elsa creates snow in their room. In their excitement, Elsa accidentally injures Anna with her icy magic. Their parents, King Agnarr and Queen Iduna, call for the aid of the colony of hidden folk, led by Grand Pabbie ("Hidden Folk"). He heals Anna and removes her memories of Elsa's magic. Elsa asks Grand Pabbie to remove her magic, but he says that it is a part of her. He gives her a vision of her future, frightening Elsa, who believes that her magic will cause death. The King isolates the sisters within the castle. Elsa shuts Anna out when Anna seeks to play ("Do You Want to Build a Snowman?"), and Elsa's fear of her powers grows. While the princesses are still young, the Queen and King sail to seek a solution to help Elsa control her powers, and they die at sea during a storm.

Years pass. The day before Elsa's coronation as Queen of Arendelle, Anna asks if there is anything she can do for her sister. Elsa, her room coated in ice, refuses to open her door out of fear of hurting Anna again. Anna is excited for the castle's gates to open ("For the First Time in Forever") and meets the handsome Prince Hans ("Hans of the Southern Isles"). Although the people rejoice at the prospect of a new monarch ("Queen Anointed"), Elsa is terrified that the kingdom's citizens might find out about her powers and fear her, while wishing to be able to reconnect with Anna ("Dangerous to Dream"). Elsa's coronation goes smoothly, and she initiates her first contact with Anna in years. They enjoy the coronation together, with Anna talking the Duke of Weselton out of dancing with the newly crowned Queen. However, Elsa leaves after Anna asks about keeping the gates open. Anna falls in love with Hans ("Love Is an Open Door"), who quickly proposes marriage to her, and the two share a kiss after she accepts. The couple asks for Elsa's blessing, who objects because the two have only known each other for a day. After intense questioning from Anna about shutting her out of her life, Elsa accidentally unleashes her powers before the court. The Duke brands her a monster. Elsa flees to the North Mountain without realizing that her suppressed magic has engulfed Arendelle in an eternal winter.

Anna goes in search of Elsa, leaving Hans in charge of the kingdom during her absence. Up in the mountains, ice harvester Kristoff and his reindeer Sven ("Reindeer(s) Are Better Than People") are found by the ill-equipped Anna, still in her coronation dress. She orders Kristoff to take her to the North Mountain, the source of the storm. Kristoff gives her a set of winter clothes, and she leaves her dress behind. In view of her sudden engagement, Kristoff and Anna disagree about love as they cross a bridge ("What Do You Know About Love"), and Anna saves Kristoff from falling off the bridge. Anna and Kristoff then encounter a newly created Olaf, who offers to guide them to Elsa and sings about his love for summer ("In Summer"). A soldier arrives in Arendelle with Anna's dress, and Hans fears for Anna's safety. He assembles a search party ("Hans of the Southern Isles" (reprise)), including the Duke and two of his men, who intend to put her in her place. Meanwhile, on the North Mountain, Elsa builds an ice castle with her powers and transforms her coronation dress into a sparkly ice gown ("Let It Go").

=== Act II ===
Anna, Kristoff, and Olaf arrive at Wandering Oaken's Trading Post & Sauna to meet the owner, Oaken ("Hygge"). Anna enjoys the sauna together with its many other patrons. Kristoff convinces Oaken and his patrons to aid their journey; Oaken gives them provisions and a winter dress for Anna.

Reaching the ice palace, Anna meets Elsa ("I Can't Lose You"), but when she reveals what has become of Arendelle, Elsa becomes angry and frustrated, saying that she cannot fix it, and she accidentally freezes Anna's heart. Out of fear of hurting Anna further, Elsa forces her, Kristoff, Sven, and Olaf out of the palace. Anna's hair begins turning white, so Kristoff takes her to meet the hidden folk, his adoptive family, who recognize Anna as the princess and attempt to match her with Kristoff, despite him mentioning her betrothal to Hans ("Fixer Upper"). After Anna collapses, Grand Pabbie attempts to remove the magic freezing her heart but fails; Kristoff realizes that he is falling in love with her ("Kristoff Lullaby"). Grand Pabbie reveals that Anna will freeze solid unless "an act of true love" reverses the spell. Kristoff selflessly races Anna back home so Hans can give her true love's kiss.

In the ice castle, Elsa considers whether she is a monster and wonders how can she end the storm, unsure whether the storm would end or grow worse if she were to die ("Monster"). She resolves to stay alive to end the storm and lowers the defenses around the castle, allowing Hans and his men to capture her. Home, Anna is delivered to Hans, but rather than kissing her, he reveals that he has been plotting to seize the throne of Arendelle by allowing Anna to freeze to death and accusing Elsa of her murder ("Hans of the Southern Isles" (reprise 2)). Hans locks Anna in a room to die, as Anna reflects on her mistakes while still holding on to the idea of love ("True Love"). Olaf frees Anna, and they venture into the blizzard outside to meet Kristoff, whom Olaf reveals is in love with her.

Hans publicly charges Elsa with treason and sentences her to death. Elsa escapes her chains and flees outside as a blizzard grows ("Colder by the Minute"). Kristoff and Anna struggle to find each other. Hans confronts Elsa, claiming that she killed Anna, causing Elsa to break down and the storm to pause. Anna finally finds Kristoff but spots Hans about to kill Elsa; she leaps in the way and freezes solid, stopping Hans. Devastated, Elsa mourns her sister, who thaws out, her sacrifice constituting "an act of true love". Realizing that her magic is controlled by love, Elsa ends the winter ("Vuelie (Love Thaws)"). Anna punches Hans, and she and Kristoff become a couple, with Elsa's blessing. Elsa and Anna reunite without fear for the first time, as their parents, young Elsa and young Anna appear in the background, signaling the healing of the sisters' painful past (Finale).

== Musical numbers ==
Act I

- "Vuelie"† – Company
- "Let the Sun Shine On" – Young Anna, Young Elsa, King, Queen and Townspeople
- "A Little Bit of You" – Young Elsa and Young Anna
- "Hidden Folk" – Queen, Pabbie, Young Elsa, King and Company
- "Do You Want to Build a Snowman?"† – Young Anna, Anna and Elsa
- "For the First Time in Forever"† – Anna, Elsa and Townspeople
- "Hans of the Southern Isles" – Hans
- "Queen Anointed" – Townspeople
- "Dangerous to Dream" – Elsa and Townspeople
- "Love Is an Open Door"† – Anna and Hans
- "Reindeer(s) Are Better Than People"† – Kristoff
- "What Do You Know About Love?" – Anna and Kristoff
- "In Summer"† – Olaf
- "Hans of the Southern Isles" (reprise) – Hans, Weselton and Townspeople
- "Let It Go"† – Elsa

Act II

- "Hygge" – Oaken, Kristoff, Anna, Olaf, Family and Friends
- "I Can't Lose You"∞ – Anna and Elsa
- "Fixer Upper"† – Bulda, Pabbie, Olaf and Hidden Folk
- "Kristoff Lullaby" – Kristoff
- "Monster" – Elsa, Hans and Men
- "Hans of the Southern Isles" (reprise 2) – Hans and Anna
- "True Love"± – Anna
- "Colder by the Minute" – Anna, Kristoff, Elsa, Hans and Townspeople
- "Finale" – Company

All songs by Kristen Anderson-Lopez and Robert Lopez except "Vuelie" (music and lyrics by Christophe Beck and Frode Fjellheim)

† Featured in the 2013 film

∞ Song added February 2020, replacing a reprise of "For the First Time in Forever"

± Song cut February 2020

== Characters and casts ==
Character	Broadway	North American tour	West End
Character	2018	2019	2021
Elsa	Caissie Levy	Caroline Bowman	Samantha Barks
Anna	Patti Murin	Caroline Innerbichler	Stephanie McKeon
Kristoff	Jelani Alladin	Mason Reeves	Obioma Ugoala
Hans	John Riddle	Austin Colby	Oliver Ormson
Olaf	Greg Hildreth	F. Michael Haynie	Craig Gallivan
Pabbie	Timothy Hughes	Tyler Jimenez	Joshua St. Clair
Weselton	Robert Creighton	Jeremy Morse	Richard Frame
Oaken	Kevin Del Aguila	Michael Milkanin	Jak Skelly
Sven	Andrew Pirozzi; Adam Jepsen	Collin Baja; Evan Strand	Ashley Birchall; Mikayla Jade
Young Anna	Audrey Bennett; Mattea Conforti	Stella R. Cobb; Arwen Monzon-Sanders	Summer Beston; Asanda Abbie Masike; Kanon Narumi; Ellie Shenker
Young Elsa	Brooklyn Nelson; Ayla Schwartz	Alyssa Kim; Jaiden Klein	Minaii.K; Tilly-Raye Bayer; Freya Scott; Sasha Watson-Lobo
Queen Iduna	Ann Sanders	Marina Kondo	Jacqui Sanchez
King Agnarr	James Brown III	Kyle Lamar Mitchell	Gabriel Mokake
Bulda	Olivia Phillip	Brit West	Emily Mae

=== Notable replacements ===
==== Broadway ====
- Anna – McKenzie Kurtz (February 18, 2020 – March 11, 2020)
- Elsa – Ciara Renée (February 18, 2020 – March 11, 2020)
- Hans – Ryan McCartan (February 18, 2020 – March 11, 2020)
- Olaf – Ryann Redmond (February 19, 2019 – March 11, 2020)

==== North American Tour ====
- Anna – McKenzie Kurtz (March 17 – April 11, 2022)
- Elsa – Alyssa Fox (August 2 – September 1, 2024)
- Hans – Ryan McCartan (March 17 – April 17, 2022; July 12 – September 4, 2022)

==== West End ====
- Anna – Laura Dawkes (September 27, 2023 – September 8, 2024)
- Elsa – Jenna Lee-James (August 23, 2023 – January 28, 2024)

== Recordings ==
Prior to the official opening of the musical on Broadway, four singles were released digitally: "Monster" in February 2018, "What Do You Know About Love", "Dangerous to Dream" and "True Love", all in March 2018. The Original Broadway Cast Album was released digitally on May 11, 2018, with a physical (CD) release following on June 8, 2018. For the recording, the orchestra was expanded from 21 members to 44, including 22 strings. The album includes a song cut from the Broadway production as a bonus track, "When Everything Falls Apart".

The West End production was filmed and released on Disney+ on June 20, 2025, starring Barks and Dawkes.

== Reception ==
Reviews of the Denver tryout were mixed but found the show promising; "fun but not transporting", said The Denver Post. Mark Shenton wrote in The Stage: "Kristen Anderson-Lopez and Robert Lopez have augmented their score for the original film – which featured just eight songs – to 20 songs in all now. There are occasional moments that feel padded ... but the surging power ballads that are the score's signature are stunningly delivered by [Levy and Murin]."

The Broadway premiere received mixed reviews. Jesse Green of The New York Times called the show "rousing, often dull, alternately dopey". He praised Levy's and Murin's performances as well as the set and lighting design but criticized the new musical numbers. The 2021 West End production received mostly favorable reviews; Arifa Akbar stated in The Guardian: "What is more surprising than the uniformly storming singing voices and the theatrical razzmatazz is the sense of a real, beating heart in the relationship between the two tortured sisters".

== Awards and nominations ==
=== Original Broadway production ===
Year	Award	Category	Nominee	Result
2018	Drama Desk Award	Outstanding Actor in a Musical	Jelani Alladin	Nominated
2018	Drama Desk Award	Outstanding Puppet Design	Michael Curry	Won
2018	Tony Awards	Best Musical		Nominated
2018	Tony Awards	Best Book of a Musical	Jennifer Lee	Nominated
2018	Tony Awards	Best Original Score	Robert Lopez and Kristen Anderson-Lopez	Nominated

=== Original West End production ===
Year	Award	Category	Nominee	Result
2022	Laurence Olivier Awards	Best New Musical		Nominated
2022	Laurence Olivier Awards	Best Actress in a Musical	Stephanie McKeon	Nominated
2022	Laurence Olivier Awards	Best Costume Design	Christopher Oram	Nominated
2022	Laurence Olivier Awards	Best Lighting Design	Neil Austin	Nominated
