= Laura Dawkes =

Welsh actress

- Born: April 17, 2002 (age 24)
- Education: Emil Dale Academy
- Occupation: Musical Theater Actress

Laura Dawkes (born 17 April 2002) is a Welsh actress. She is best known for playing Anna in Frozen on London's West End.

== Early life and education ==
Originally from Cardiff, Dawkes worked in high school as a Disney princess impersonator. Dawkes graduated from Emil Dale Academy in 2023 with a Bachelor of Arts (BA) in Musical Theatre (awarded by the University of Bedfordshire).

Dakwes has said her singing inspirations include Jennifer Hudson and Tori Kelly.

== Career ==
In 2022, she was cast in the British musical Kin, loosely based on the true story of the Rajneeshpuram community in the 1980s. Dawkes made her West End debut in Frozen as Anna. For her performance as Anna, Dawkes received a nomination for Best Professional Stage Debut. Dawkes also appears in the proshot version of the musical, alongside Samantha Barks, which premiered on Disney+ in June 2025.

In July 2026, she began her 12 week tour with the comedy musical Six the Musical as Jane Seymour, directed by Lucy Moss and Jamie Armitage.

== Theater ==
Year	Title	Roles	Theater	Notes
2022	Kin	Carole	The Factory Playhouse, Hitchin	
2023 - 2024	Frozen: The Musical	Anna of Arendalle	Theatre Royal Drury Lane, West End	
2026	Six	Jane Seymour	UK & China Tour	

== Awards and nominations ==
Year	Award	Nomination	Work	Result	Ref.
2024	WhatsOnStage Awards	Best Professional Debut Performance	Frozen: The Musical	Nominated	
