= The Coast News =

American newspaper based in California

Coordinates: 33.048835°N 117.293874°W

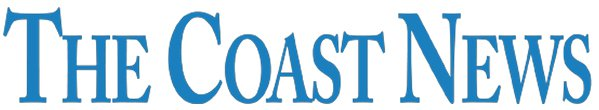
- Type: Weekly newspaper
- Format: Tabloid
- Owner: Coast News Group
- Publisher: Chris Kydd
- Editor: Jordan P. Ingram
- Founded: September 17, 1987
- Language: American English
- Headquarters: 531 Encinitas Blvd. #204; Encinitas, California 92024
- Country: United States
- Circulation: The Coast News 20,000; Rancho Santa Fe 10,000; Inland Edition 13,000
- Readership: Camp Pendleton, Oceanside, Carlsbad, Encinitas, Solana Beach, Del Mar, Carmel Valley, & Rancho Santa Fe.
- Sister newspapers: Rancho Santa Fe, Inland Edition
- OCLC number: 44918589
- Website: thecoastnews.com

The Coast News is an American, English-language weekly newspaper published in Encinitas, California. It covers community news, events, and city government in North San Diego County.

== History ==
On September 17, 1987, Jim Kydd published the first edition of The Beach News. In 1997, the paper was renamed to The Coast News. In 2014, the newspaper added an Inland Edition for residents of Vista, San Marcos and Escondido.

== Political Action Website Controversy ==
In 2012, Kydd quietly launched the political action website www.EncinitasElections.com and used it to pay for “Dump Stocks, Fire Muir” advertising in an attempt to oust city councilmember Mark Muir. The website encouraged people to vote against Muir and Mayor Jerome Stocks. Kydd did not publicly disclose his involved in the website, but public records led a reporter with the North Coast Current to discover the connection.

The California Fair Political Practices Commission then sued Kydd, alleging he violated state election laws by failing to disclose his involvement in a city council campaign and failing to file the required financial paperwork. The lawsuit sought $30,000 in civil penalties. A settlement was reached and Kydd only paid a $1,000 fine.
