= Yasuhiko Fukuoka =

Japanese composer, pianist, and arranger

Yasuhiko Fukuoka is a composer for concerts, film, and television. A native of Japan, he studied Film Scoring and Music Synthesis at Berklee College of Music. His works have been performed in North America, Central America, Europe and Asia, and his appearances include Carnegie Hall, Lincoln Center, Birdland, Festival de Cannes (Cannes Film Festival), and many others. Yasuhiko currently lives and works based out of New York, NY.

== Biography ==
Yasuhiko Fukuoka is a composer, pianist, and arranger

By the age of 12, Yasuhiko knew he wanted to be a musician. Born in Nara, Japan, he studied classical piano, composition and percussion with various prestigious professors in Japan. At the age of 15, his self-published CD caught the attention of a producer at Kintetsu Cable Network (Japan), and he began his career in music. By the time he graduated from high school, he had already written and produced music for TV and film, as well as composed for various bands and concerts.

At 18, he was granted a scholarship to attend Berklee College of Music and moved to Boston. While working with great musicians from all over the world, he learned different genres of music including classical, contemporary, computer, film, and other music from different countries.

During his schooling years, he received numerous awards including an Award for Excellence at both the Kyoto Piano Competition and the Yamaha PTC Concert, Berklee World Scholarship, the BMI Scholarship, Roland Award, to name a few. In 2005, Berklee Film Scoring department commissioned Yasuhiko to compose an orchestra piece to represent the department at the PWD Concert. The premier of the piece was enthusiastically received, and he received publicity from both local and Japanese media.

After graduating Berklee with the highest honor, he moved to New York and started working as a freelance composer. He has been writing for television, film, theater, as well as arranging / producing for various artists internationally. He has also worked with world-renowned producer / DJ Kazuhiko Gomi on many projects. In 2010, he was chosen to be one of the nine emerging film composers to participate in the BMI filmscoring workshop with Rick Baitz.

He has performed at Weill Recital Hall at Carnegie Hall, Steinway Hall, Lincoln Center, Webster Hall, Berklee Performance Center and many other venues in the US, Japan, and Italy. His credit includes TV, Film, Theater, commercial videos, as well as concert pieces. His works have been played in the US, Canada, Japan, South Korea, Italy and Germany.

He studies include: composition with Yukiou Maeda, John Bavicchi and Dr. Richard Boulanger; conducting with David Callahan; classical piano with Kazutaka Kanazawa and Yoko Nakamura, jazz piano with Laszlo Gardony and Bob Winter, and master class with Oxana Yablonskaya.

== Accolades ==
Yasuhiko Fukuoka has received numerous awards such as the BMI Film Scoring Scholarship (2005), Roland Award (2004), Berklee World Scholarship, three consecutive Berklee Achievement Scholarships, and an Award for Excellence at both the Kyoto Piano Competition and the Yamaha PTC Concert, to name a few. He graduated summa cum laude from Berklee College of Music, where he studied film scoring and music synthesis along with classical and jazz composition. During his last year at Berklee, he was commissioned to write an orchestral piece to represent three hundred students in the Film Scoring Department at the 2005 Writing Division Awards Concert. His composition "Longing Hurled Into The River Piedra" was enthusiastically received, and as a result he was featured in JazzNin Magazine (Japan) and Good Morning Emerson (TV show) on Emerson Channel/BNN in Boston, MA. Yasuhiko has been acclaimed by the New York Times as "brilliant."

== Concert pieces (selected) ==
- "Journey of a Thousand Miles" (2012, commissioned by CYCNY) for Orchestra
- "Dry Harbor" (2011) for Piano Quartet
- "I Do What I Can" (2011, commissioned by Hope Sings) - Lyrics by Beth Blatt, Music by Yasuhiko Fukuoka
- "Shepard" (2011, commissioned by QAS) - premiered at Webster Hall, New York, NY
- "Deep Forest" (2010, commissioned by QAS) - premiered at Webster Hall, New York, NY
- "Kono Michi Kara" for brass band (2010, commissioned by Asukano Brass Band) - premiered in Nara, Japan
- "I Am My Beloved's" (2010, commissioned) - World Premiere in Abano Terme, Italy; US Premiere at Merkin Concert Hall at Kaufman Center, New York, NY
- "Vive la Canadienne" (2010, Commissioned) - premiered at Chan Centre Concert Hall, Vancouver, Canada
- "Puzzle" (2009) - premiered at Steinway Hall, New York City
- "Identity" (2006) CD Released by Berklee College of Music
- "Longing Hurled Into The River Piedra"(2005, Commissioned) - premiered at Berklee Performance Center, Boston, MA

== Film, television and theater pieces (selected) ==
- Light, Whisky, & Parting (Original music) - premiered at Webster Hall, New York, NY
- Beneath It All (Original music) - performed at SITE Fest in Bushwick, Webster Hall, and Nicu's Spoon Theater in New York, NY
- Jass Stewart mayoral campaign TV commercials (Original music)
- "Alan" (Original music) - directed by Alexander Modzeleski
- "HAPPY NEW YORKER" (Music arrangement / production) by TONTON-Byoshi
- "Language of Caring" (Original music) - Sponsored by Blue Cross Blue Shield
- "Stories for Life" (Original music) - Produced by Invent Media, Inc.
- "Every Child a Champion" (Original music) - Produced by Invent Media, Inc.
- "Donden League" (Opening and ending music) - Kintetsu Cable Network
- "Mannequin and Martian" (Original Music) - Directed by Melinda Rainsberger
- "Ikoma City 30th Anniversary Video" (Original Music) - Produced by the city of Ikoma, Japan

== Arrangements and covers (selected) ==
- Someone Like You (Adele)
- Every Breath You Take (Sting)
- Rhapsody in Blue (Gershwin)

== Performances (selected) ==
- Carnegie Hall - Weill Recital Hall (New York, NY)
- Alice Tully Hall, Lincoln Center (New York, NY)
- Steinway Hall (New York, NY)
- Merkin Concert Hall at Kaufman Center (New York, NY)
- Webster Hall (New York, NY)
- Birdland (New York, NY)
- Greenhouse (New York, NY)
- Joe's Pub (New York, NY)
- Bitter End (New York, NY)
- Greene Space (New York, NY)
- Broadway Baby (New York, NY)
- Alexander and Buono Festival of Music (Abano Terme, Italy)
- Berklee Performance Center (Boston, MA)
- David Friend Recital Hall (Boston, MA)
- Nara Centennial Hall (Nara, Japan)
- Kashihara Manyo Hall (Nara, Japan)
