= List of accolades received by Frozen (2013 film) =

Frozen accolades
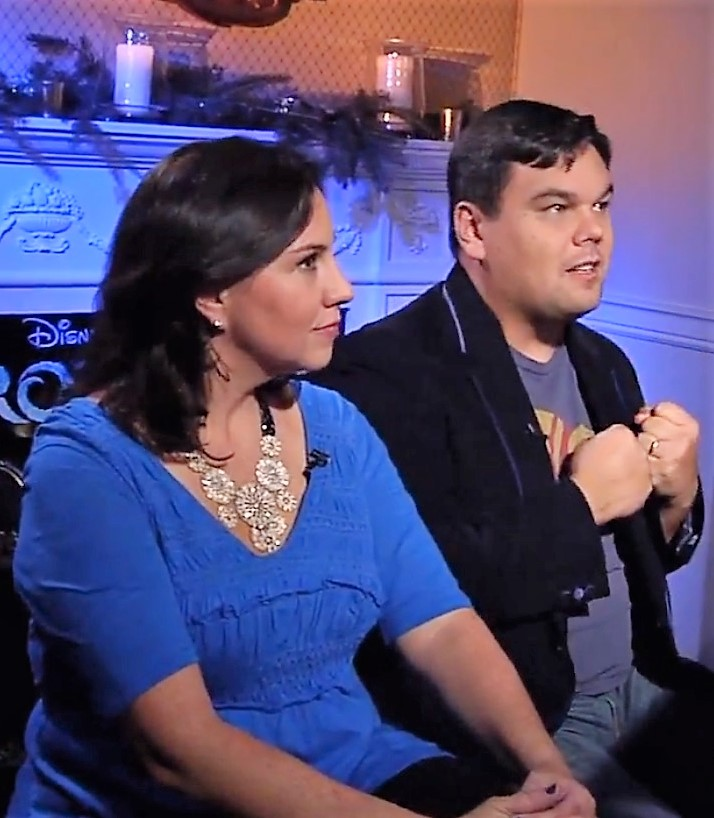
- Kristen Anderson-Lopez and Robert Lopez garnered many accolades for composing the song "Let It Go".
Awards and nominations
Award	Wins	Nominations
3D Creative Arts Awards	2	2
Academy Awards	2	2
African-American Film Critics Association Awards	1	1
Alliance of Women Film Journalists Awards	1	5
American Cinema Editors Awards	1	1
American Music Awards	1	1
Annie Awards	5	10
Artios Awards	1	1
Austin Film Critics Association Awards	1	1
Billboard Music Awards	1	1
Boston Society of Film Critics Awards	1	1
British Academy Children's Awards	1	2
British Academy Film Awards	1	1
Chicago Film Critics Association Awards	0	1
Cinema Audio Society Awards	1	1
Critics' Choice Movie Awards	2	2
Dallas-Fort Worth Film Critics Association Awards	1	1
Dorian Awards	0	1
Dubai International Film Festival	1	1
Florida Film Critics Circle Awards	1	1
Georgia Film Critics Association Awards	1	2
Golden Globe Awards	1	2
Golden Reel Awards	1	2
Golden Trailer Awards	2	6
Grammy Awards	2	3
Guild of Music Supervisors Awards	0	1
Hollywood Post Alliance Awards	0	1
Houston Film Critics Society Awards	1	2
Hugo Awards	0	1
International Cinephile Society Awards	0	1
International Film Music Critics Association Awards	0	1
Japan Academy Film Prize	1	1
Kansas City Film Critics Circle Awards	1	1
Movieguide Awards	1	1
MTV Fandom Awards	0	1
New York Film Critics Circle Awards	0	1
Nickelodeon Kids' Choice Awards	1	1
Online Film Critics Society Awards	0	1
People's Choice Awards	0	1
Producers Guild of America Awards	1	1
San Diego Film Critics Society Awards	0	1
San Francisco Film Critics Circle Awards	1	1
Satellite Awards	0	2
Saturn Awards	1	2
St. Louis Gateway Film Critics Association Awards	2	2
Teen Choice Awards	0	1
Toronto Film Critics Association Awards	1	1
Visual Effects Society Awards	4	4
Washington D.C. Area Film Critics Association Awards	1	2
Women Film Critics Circle Awards	1	1
World Soundtrack Awards	0	1

Totals (Note: Certain award groups do not simply award one winner. They acknowledge several different recipients, have runners-up, and have third place. Since this is a specific recognition and is different from losing an award, runner-up mentions are considered wins in this award tally. For simplification and to avoid errors, each award in this list has been presumed to have had a prior nomination.)
- Wins: 49
- Nominations: 86

Frozen is a 2013 American animated musical fantasy film produced by Walt Disney Animation Studios. Produced by Peter Del Vecho, it was directed by Chris Buck and Jennifer Lee from a screenplay by Lee. The directors co-wrote the story with Shane Morris, drawing inspiration by Hans Christian Andersen's The Snow Queen (1844). The film stars the voices of Kristen Bell, Idina Menzel, Josh Gad, Jonathan Groff and Santino Fontana. Frozen follows Princess Anna as she teams up with Kristoff, Sven, and Olaf to find her estranged sister Elsa, whose icy powers have inadvertently trapped their kingdom in eternal winter.

Frozen premiered in Hollywood, Los Angeles, on November 19, 2013, and was theatrically released on November 27. Produced on a budget of $150 million, it grossed $1.282 billion worldwide, finishing its theatrical run as the highest-grossing film of 2013 and the fifth-highest-grossing film of all time; it ranked as the highest-grossing animated film of all time from March 2014 until August 2019. On the review aggregator website Rotten Tomatoes, the film holds an approval rating of 89% based on 251 reviews.

Frozen garnered awards and nominations in various categories. It won Best Original Song ("Let It Go") and Best Animated Feature at the 86th Academy Awards. Frozen became the first film produced by Disney Animation to win Best Animated Feature. The film won five of ten nominations at the 41st Annie Awards. At the 66th British Academy Film Awards, Frozen won Best Animated Film. It won Best Animated Feature and Best Song ("Let It Go") at the 19th Critics' Choice Awards. The film won Best Animated Feature Film and received a nomination for Best Original Song – Motion Picture ("Let It Go") at the 71st Golden Globe Awards. Various critic circles also picked Frozen as the best animated feature film of the year.

== Accolades ==
Accolades received by Frozen (2013 film)
Award	Date of ceremony	Category	Recipient(s)	Result	Ref.
3D Creative Arts Awards	January 28, 2014	Best Feature Film – Animation	Frozen	Won	
3D Creative Arts Awards	January 28, 2014	Best Stereoscopic Feature Film – Animation	Frozen	Won	
Academy Awards	March 2, 2014	Best Animated Feature	Chris Buck, Jennifer Lee, and Peter Del Vecho	Won	
Academy Awards	March 2, 2014	Best Original Song	Kristen Anderson-Lopez and Robert Lopez for "Let It Go"	Won	
African-American Film Critics Association Awards	December 13, 2013	Best Animated Feature	Frozen	Won	
Alliance of Women Film Journalists Awards	December 19, 2013	Best Animated Feature	Chris Buck and Jennifer Lee	Nominated	
Alliance of Women Film Journalists Awards	December 19, 2013	Best Woman Director	Jennifer Lee	Nominated	
Alliance of Women Film Journalists Awards	December 19, 2013	Best Woman Screenwriter	Jennifer Lee	Nominated	
Alliance of Women Film Journalists Awards	December 19, 2013	Best Animated Female	Anna (Kristen Bell)	Nominated	
Alliance of Women Film Journalists Awards	December 19, 2013	Best Animated Female	Elsa (Idina Menzel)	Won	
American Cinema Editors Awards	February 7, 2014	Best Edited Animated Feature Film	Jeff Draheim	Won	
American Music Awards	November 23, 2014	Top Soundtrack	Frozen	Won	
Annie Awards	February 1, 2014	Best Animated Feature	Frozen	Won	
Annie Awards	February 1, 2014	Outstanding Achievement for Character Animation in a Feature Production	Tony Smeed	Nominated	
Annie Awards	February 1, 2014	Outstanding Achievement for Character Design in a Feature Production	Bill Schwab	Nominated	
Annie Awards	February 1, 2014	Outstanding Achievement for Directing in a Feature Production	Chris Buck and Jennifer Lee	Won	
Annie Awards	February 1, 2014	Outstanding Achievement for Editorial in a Feature Production	Jeff Draheim	Nominated	
Annie Awards	February 1, 2014	Outstanding Achievement for Music in a Feature Production	Robert Lopez, Kristen Anderson-Lopez, and Christophe Beck	Won	
Annie Awards	February 1, 2014	Outstanding Achievement for Production Design in an Animated Feature Production	Michael Giaimo, Lisa Keene, and David Womersley	Won	
Annie Awards	February 1, 2014	Outstanding Achievement for Storyboarding in a Feature Production	John Ripa	Nominated	
Annie Awards	February 1, 2014	Outstanding Achievement for Voice Acting in a Feature Production	Josh Gad	Won	
Annie Awards	February 1, 2014	Outstanding Achievement for Writing in a Feature Production	Jennifer Lee	Nominated	
Artios Awards	January 22, 2015	Feature Film – Animation	Frozen	Won	
Austin Film Critics Association Awards	December 17, 2013	Best Animated Film	Frozen	Won	
Billboard Music Awards	May 17, 2015	Top Soundtrack	Frozen	Won	
Boston Society of Film Critics Awards	December 8, 2013	Best Animated Film	Frozen	Runner-up	
British Academy Children's Awards	November 23, 2014	Feature Film	Frozen	Won	
British Academy Children's Awards	November 23, 2014	Kid's Vote — Film	Frozen	Nominated	
British Academy Film Awards	February 16, 2014	Best Animated Film	Chris Buck and Jennifer Lee	Won	
Chicago Film Critics Association Awards	December 16, 2013	Best Animated Film	Frozen	Nominated	
Cinema Audio Society Awards	February 22, 2014	Outstanding Achievement in Sound Mixing for a Motion Picture – Animated	Gabriel Guy, David E. Fluhr, Casey Stone, and Mary Jo Lang	Won	
Critics' Choice Movie Awards	January 16, 2014	Best Animated Feature	Frozen	Won	
Critics' Choice Movie Awards	January 16, 2014	Best Song	Kristen Anderson-Lopez and Robert Lopez for "Let It Go"	Won	
Dallas–Fort Worth Film Critics Association Awards	December 16, 2013	Best Animated Film	Frozen	Won	
Dorian Awards	January 21, 2014	Visually Striking Film of the Year	Frozen	Nominated	
Dubai International Film Festival	December 13, 2013	Emirates NBD People's Choice Award	Chris Buck and Jennifer Lee	Won	
Florida Film Critics Circle Awards	December 18, 2013	Best Animated Film	Frozen	Won	
Georgia Film Critics Association Awards	January 10, 2014	Best Animated Film	Frozen	Won	
Georgia Film Critics Association Awards	January 10, 2014	Best Original Song	"Let It Go"	Nominated	
Golden Globe Awards	January 12, 2014	Best Animated Feature Film	Frozen	Won	
Golden Globe Awards	January 12, 2014	Best Original Song – Motion Picture	Kristen Anderson-Lopez and Robert Lopez for "Let It Go"	Nominated	
Golden Reel Awards	February 16, 2014	Outstanding Achievement in Sound Editing – Sound Effects, Foley, Dialogue and ADR for Animated Feature Film	Odin Benitez	Nominated	
Golden Reel Awards	February 16, 2014	Outstanding Achievement in Sound Editing – Musical for Feature Film	Earl Ghaffari and Fernand Bos	Won	
Golden Trailer Awards	May 30, 2014	Best Animation/Family	"Forces First Ped" (Trailer Park, Inc.)	Won	
Golden Trailer Awards	May 30, 2014	Best Animation/Family TV Spot	"Cheek" :30 (Trailer Park, Inc.)	Nominated	
Golden Trailer Awards	May 30, 2014	Best Music TV Spot	"Let it Go Review" :60 (Trailer Park, Inc.)	Won	
Golden Trailer Awards	May 30, 2014	Best Motion Poster	"Character LOS" (The Refinery AV)	Nominated	
Golden Trailer Awards	May 30, 2014	Best Pre-show Theatrical Advertising for a Brand	"Popcorn" :30 (Trailer Park, Inc.)	Nominated	
Golden Trailer Awards	May 30, 2014	Best Viral Video or Campaign	"Olaf-A-Lots International and Domestic Online Series" (Trailer Park, Inc.)	Nominated	
Grammy Awards	February 8, 2015	Best Song Written for Visual Media	Kristen Anderson-Lopez and Robert Lopez for "Let It Go"	Won	
Grammy Awards	February 8, 2015	Best Score Soundtrack for Visual Media	Christophe Beck	Nominated	
Grammy Awards	February 8, 2015	Best Compilation Soundtrack for Visual Media	Frozen	Won	
Guild of Music Supervisors Awards	February 26, 2014	Best Film Studio Music Department	Walt Disney Studios Motion Pictures (Note: Also for the studio's 2013 films Iron Man 3, The Lone Ranger, Monsters University, Oz the Great and Powerful, Saving Mr. Banks, and Thor: The Dark World)	Nominated	
Hollywood Post Alliance Awards	November 6, 2014	Outstanding Sound – Feature Film	David Fluhr, Gabriel Guy, and Odin Benitez	Nominated	
Houston Film Critics Society Awards	December 15, 2013	Best Animated Feature	Frozen	Won	
Houston Film Critics Society Awards	December 15, 2013	Best Original Song	Kristen Anderson-Lopez and Robert Lopez for "Let It Go"	Nominated	
Hugo Awards	August 17, 2014	Best Dramatic Presentation, Long Form	Chris Buck and Jennifer Lee	Nominated	
International Cinephile Society Awards	February 23, 2014	Best Animated Film	Frozen	Nominated	
International Film Music Critics Association Awards	February 20, 2014	Best Original Score for an Animated Film	Christophe Beck	Nominated	
Japan Academy Film Prize	February 27, 2015	Outstanding Foreign Language Film	Frozen	Won	
Kansas City Film Critics Circle Awards	December 15, 2013	Best Animated Feature	Frozen	Won (Note: Tied with Despicable Me 2 (2013))	
Movieguide Awards	February 7, 2014	Best Movie for Families	Frozen	Won	
MTV Fandom Awards	July 24, 2014	Breakout Fandom of the Year	Frozen	Nominated	
New York Film Critics Circle Awards	December 3, 2013	Best Animated Feature	Frozen	Nominated	
Nickelodeon Kids' Choice Awards	March 29, 2014	Favorite Animated Movie	Frozen	Won	
Online Film Critics Society Awards	December 16, 2013	Best Animated Feature	Frozen	Nominated	
People's Choice Awards	January 8, 2014	Favorite Year End Movie	Frozen	Nominated	
Producers Guild of America Awards	January 19, 2014	Best Animated Motion Picture	Peter Del Vecho	Won	
San Diego Film Critics Society Awards	December 11, 2013	Best Animated Feature	Frozen	Nominated	
San Francisco Film Critics Circle Awards	December 15, 2013	Best Animated Feature	Frozen	Won	
Satellite Awards	February 23, 2014	Best Motion Picture, Animated or Mixed Media	Frozen	Nominated	
Satellite Awards	February 23, 2014	Best Original Song	Kristen Anderson-Lopez and Robert Lopez for "Let It Go"	Nominated	
Saturn Awards	June 26, 2014	Best Animated Film	Frozen	Won	
Saturn Awards	June 26, 2014	Best Writing	Jennifer Lee	Nominated	
St. Louis Gateway Film Critics Association Awards	December 14, 2013	Best Animated Feature	Frozen	Won	
St. Louis Gateway Film Critics Association Awards	December 14, 2013	Best Soundtrack	Frozen	Runner-up	
Teen Choice Awards	August 10, 2014	Choice Music Single: Female	Idina Menzel for "Let It Go"	Nominated	
Toronto Film Critics Association Awards	December 17, 2013	Best Animated Film	Frozen	Runner-up (Note: Shared with The Croods (2013))	
Visual Effects Society Awards	February 12, 2014	Outstanding Visual Effects in an Animated Feature	Chris Buck, Jennifer Lee, Peter Del Vecho, and Lino Di Salvo	Won	
Visual Effects Society Awards	February 12, 2014	Outstanding Animated Performance in an Animated Feature	Alexander Alvarado, Joy Johnson, Chad Stubblefield, and Wayne Unten for "Bringing the Snow Queen to Life"	Won	
Visual Effects Society Awards	February 12, 2014	Outstanding Created Environment in an Animated Feature	Virgilio John Aquino, Alessandro Jacomini, Lance Summers, and David Womersley for "Elsa's Ice Palace"	Won	
Visual Effects Society Awards	February 12, 2014	Outstanding Effects Simulations in an Animated Feature	Eric W. Araujo, Marc Bryant, Dong Joo Byun, and Tim Molinder for Elsa's "Blizzard"	Won	
Washington D.C. Area Film Critics Association Awards	December 9, 2013	Best Animated Feature	Frozen	Won	
Washington D.C. Area Film Critics Association Awards	December 9, 2013	Best Score	Christophe Beck	Nominated	
Women Film Critics Circle Awards	December 16, 2013	Best Animated Females	Frozen	Won	
World Soundtrack Awards	October 25, 2014	Best Original Song Written Directly for a Film	Kristen Anderson-Lopez and Robert Lopez for "Let It Go"	Nominated	

== See also ==
- List of accolades received by Frozen 2
