= List of awards and nominations received by The Vampire Diaries =

Awards and nominations received by The Vampire Diaries
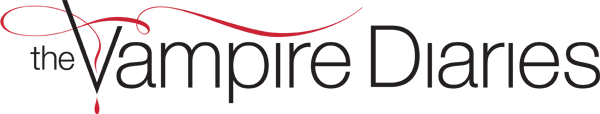
Awards and nominations
Award	Wins	Nominations
Alma Awards	0	2
Do Something Awards	0	2
MTV Fandom Awards	1	3
People's Choice Awards	5	27
Saturn Awards	0	8
Teen Choice Awards	30	67
Young Hollywood Awards	3	5

Totals (Note: Certain award groups do not simply award one winner. They acknowledge several different recipients, have runners-up, and have third place. Since this is a specific recognition and is different from losing an award, runner-up mentions are considered wins in this award tally. For simplification and to avoid errors, each award in this list has been presumed to have had a prior nomination.)
- Wins: 39
- Nominations: 114

The Vampire Diaries is an American supernatural drama television series that premiered on the CW on September 10, 2009, and concluded on March 10, 2017, after airing eight seasons. Screenwriters Kevin Williamson and Julie Plec adapted the show from L. J. Smith's novel series of the same name. The series takes place in Mystic Falls, Virginia, a fictional small town haunted by supernatural beings. It centers on the love triangle between the protagonist Elena Gilbert (Nina Dobrev) and vampire brothers Stefan Salvatore (Paul Wesley) and Damon Salvatore (Ian Somerhalder). As the narrative develops in the course of the show, the focal point shifts on the mysterious past of the town involving Elena's malevolent doppelgänger Katherine Pierce (Dobrev) and the family of Original vampires, all of whom have an evil agenda of their own.

The series has been nominated for many awards, including 67 Teen Choice Awards (30 wins), 27 People's Choice Awards (five wins), and eight Saturn Awards. The three lead characters—Dobrev, Wesley and Somerhalder—received the most nominations. Lead actress Dobrev was nominated for 21 awards, winning five Teen Choice Awards, a People's Choice Award, and a Young Hollywood Award. Somerhalder earned widespread critical acclaim for his role of Damon Salvatore and is the most nominated cast member with 30 nominations.

== Awards and nominations ==
Award	Year (Note: The listed year indicates the year of the ceremony, not necessarily the year in which the corresponding episode or season aired. Where possible, the year is linked to the article for the specific ceremony.)	Category	Nominee(s)	Result	Ref.
Alma Awards	2011	Favorite TV Actor – Supporting Role in a Drama	Michael Trevino	Nominated	
Alma Awards	2012	Favorite TV Actor – Supporting Role in a Drama	Michael Trevino	Nominated	
Do Something Awards	2012	Best TV Drama	The Vampire Diaries	Nominated	
Do Something Awards	2012	Best TV Star: Male	Ian Somerhalder	Nominated	
MTV Fandom Awards	2014	Ship of the Year	Damon Salvatore and Elena Gilbert	Won	
MTV Fandom Awards	2015	Fandom of the Year – TV Dramas	The Vampire Diaries	Nominated	
MTV Fandom Awards	2015	Ship of the Year	Bonnie Bennett and Damon Salvatore	Nominated	
People's Choice Awards	2010	Favorite New TV Drama	The Vampire Diaries	Won	
People's Choice Awards	2010	Favorite Sci-Fi/Fantasy show	The Vampire Diaries	Nominated	
People's Choice Awards	2011	Favorite Sci-Fi/Fantasy show	The Vampire Diaries	Nominated	
People's Choice Awards	2011	Favorite TV Drama	The Vampire Diaries	Nominated	
People's Choice Awards	2011	Favorite TV Drama Actor	Ian Somerhalder	Nominated	
People's Choice Awards	2012	Favorite Sci-Fi/Fantasy show	The Vampire Diaries	Nominated	
People's Choice Awards	2012	Favorite TV Drama	The Vampire Diaries	Nominated	
People's Choice Awards	2012	Favorite TV Drama Actor	Ian Somerhalder	Nominated	
People's Choice Awards	2012	Favorite TV Drama Actress	Nina Dobrev	Won	
People's Choice Awards	2013	Favorite Sci-Fi/Fantasy show	The Vampire Diaries	Nominated	
People's Choice Awards	2013	Favorite TV Drama Actor	Ian Somerhalder	Nominated	
People's Choice Awards	2013	Favorite TV Drama Actor	Paul Wesley	Nominated	
People's Choice Awards	2013	Favorite TV Drama Actress	Nina Dobrev	Nominated	
People's Choice Awards	2013	Favorite TV Fan Following	TVDFamily	Nominated	
People's Choice Awards	2014	Favorite On Screen Chemistry	Damon Salvatore and Elena Gilbert	Won	
People's Choice Awards	2014	Favorite Sci-Fi/Fantasy Show	The Vampire Diaries	Nominated	
People's Choice Awards	2014	Favorite Sci-Fi/Fantasy TV Actor	Ian Somerhalder	Won	
People's Choice Awards	2014	Favorite Sci-Fi/Fantasy TV Actress	Nina Dobrev	Nominated	
People's Choice Awards	2015	Favorite Sci-Fi/Fantasy Show	The Vampire Diaries	Nominated	
People's Choice Awards	2015	Favorite Sci-Fi/Fantasy TV Actor	Ian Somerhalder	Nominated	
People's Choice Awards	2015	Favorite Sci-Fi/Fantasy TV Actor	Paul Wesley	Nominated	
People's Choice Awards	2015	Favorite Sci-Fi/Fantasy TV Actress	Nina Dobrev	Nominated	
People's Choice Awards	2015	Favorite TV Duo	Ian Somerhalder and Nina Dobrev	Won	
People's Choice Awards	2016	Favorite Cable TV Sci-Fi/Fantasy Actor	Ian Somerhalder	Nominated	
People's Choice Awards	2016	Favorite Network TV Sci-Fi/Fantasy	The Vampire Diaries	Nominated	
People's Choice Awards	2017	Favorite Cable TV Sci-Fi/Fantasy Actor	Ian Somerhalder	Nominated	
People's Choice Awards	2017	Favorite Network TV Sci-Fi/Fantasy	The Vampire Diaries	Nominated	
Saturn Awards	2010	Best Network Series	The Vampire Diaries	Nominated	
Saturn Awards	2011	Best Network Series	The Vampire Diaries	Nominated	
Saturn Awards	2012	Best Youth-Oriented Television Series	The Vampire Diaries	Nominated	
Saturn Awards	2013	Best Youth-Oriented Television Series	The Vampire Diaries	Nominated	
Saturn Awards	2014	Best Youth-Oriented Television Series	The Vampire Diaries	Nominated	
Saturn Awards	2015	Best Youth-Oriented Television Series	The Vampire Diaries	Nominated	
Saturn Awards	2017	Best Horror Television Series	The Vampire Diaries	Nominated	
Saturn Awards	2018	Best Television DVD Release	The Vampire Diaries (The Complete Series)	Nominated	
Teen Choice Awards	2010	Choice Male Hottie	Ian Somerhalder	Nominated	
Teen Choice Awards	2010	Choice TV: Female Breakout Star	Nina Dobrev	Won	
Teen Choice Awards	2010	Choice TV: Female Scene Stealer	Kat Graham	Nominated	
Teen Choice Awards	2010	Choice TV: Male Breakout Star	Paul Wesley	Won	
Teen Choice Awards	2010	Choice TV: Villain	Ian Somerhalder	Won	
Teen Choice Awards	2010	Choice TV Actor: Fantasy/Sci-Fi	Paul Wesley	Won	
Teen Choice Awards	2010	Choice TV Actress: Fantasy/Sci-Fi	Nina Dobrev	Won	
Teen Choice Awards	2010	Choice TV Breakout Show	The Vampire Diaries	Won	
Teen Choice Awards	2010	Choice TV Show: Fantasy/Sci-Fi	The Vampire Diaries	Won	
Teen Choice Awards	2011	Choice Male Hottie	Ian Somerhalder	Nominated	
Teen Choice Awards	2011	Choice Female Hottie	Nina Dobrev	Nominated	
Teen Choice Awards	2011	Choice TV: Female Scene Stealer	Kat Graham	Won	
Teen Choice Awards	2011	Choice TV: Male Scene Stealer	Michael Trevino	Won	
Teen Choice Awards	2011	Choice TV: Villain	Joseph Morgan	Nominated	
Teen Choice Awards	2011	Choice TV Actor: Fantasy/Sci-Fi	Ian Somerhalder	Won	
Teen Choice Awards	2011	Choice TV Actor: Fantasy/Sci-Fi	Paul Wesley	Nominated	
Teen Choice Awards	2011	Choice TV Actress: Fantasy/Sci-Fi	Nina Dobrev	Won	
Teen Choice Awards	2011	Choice TV Show: Fantasy/Sci-Fi	The Vampire Diaries	Won	
Teen Choice Awards	2011	Choice Vampire	Nina Dobrev	Nominated	
Teen Choice Awards	2011	Choice Vampire	Ian Somerhalder	Nominated	
Teen Choice Awards	2011	Choice Vampire	Paul Wesley	Nominated	
Teen Choice Awards	2012	Choice Male Hottie	Ian Somerhalder	Won	
Teen Choice Awards	2012	Choice TV: Female Scene Stealer	Candice Accola	Won	
Teen Choice Awards	2012	Choice TV: Male Scene Stealer	Michael Trevino	Won	
Teen Choice Awards	2012	Choice TV: Villain	Joseph Morgan	Nominated	
Teen Choice Awards	2012	Choice TV Actor: Fantasy/Sci-Fi	Ian Somerhalder	Won	
Teen Choice Awards	2012	Choice TV Actor: Fantasy/Sci-Fi	Paul Wesley	Nominated	
Teen Choice Awards	2012	Choice TV Actress: Fantasy/Sci-Fi	Nina Dobrev	Won	
Teen Choice Awards	2012	Choice TV Actress: Fantasy/Sci-Fi	Kat Graham	Nominated	
Teen Choice Awards	2012	Choice TV Show: Fantasy/Sci-Fi	The Vampire Diaries	Won	
Teen Choice Awards	2013	Choice TV: Female Scene Stealer	Candice Accola	Nominated	
Teen Choice Awards	2013	Choice TV: Villain	Joseph Morgan	Nominated	
Teen Choice Awards	2013	Choice TV Actor: Fantasy/Sci-Fi	Ian Somerhalder	Won	
Teen Choice Awards	2013	Choice TV Actor: Fantasy/Sci-Fi	Paul Wesley	Nominated	
Teen Choice Awards	2013	Choice TV Actress: Fantasy/Sci-Fi	Nina Dobrev	Won	
Teen Choice Awards	2013	Choice TV Actress: Fantasy/Sci-Fi	Kat Graham	Nominated	
Teen Choice Awards	2013	Choice TV Male Scene Stealer	Steven R. McQueen	Nominated	
Teen Choice Awards	2013	Choice TV Show: Fantasy/Sci-Fi	The Vampire Diaries	Won	
Teen Choice Awards	2014	Choice Male Hottie	Ian Somerhalder	Nominated	
Teen Choice Awards	2014	Choice TV: Female Scene Stealer	Candice Accola	Won	
Teen Choice Awards	2014	Choice TV: Villain	Paul Wesley	Nominated	
Teen Choice Awards	2014	Choice TV: Male Scene Stealer	Michael Trevino	Nominated	
Teen Choice Awards	2014	Choice TV Actor: Sci-Fi/Fantasy	Ian Somerhalder	Won	
Teen Choice Awards	2014	Choice TV Actor: Sci-Fi/Fantasy	Paul Wesley	Nominated	
Teen Choice Awards	2014	Choice TV Actress: Sci-Fi/Fantasy	Nina Dobrev	Won	
Teen Choice Awards	2014	Choice TV Actress: Sci-Fi/Fantasy	Kat Graham	Nominated	
Teen Choice Awards	2014	Choice TV Show: Fantasy/Sci-Fi	The Vampire Diaries	Won	
Teen Choice Awards	2015	Choice TV: Chemistry	Kat Graham and Ian Somerhalder	Nominated	
Teen Choice Awards	2015	Choice TV: Liplock	Candice Accola and Paul Wesley	Nominated	
Teen Choice Awards	2015	Choice TV: Liplock	Nina Dobrev and Ian Somerhalder	Won	
Teen Choice Awards	2015	Choice TV: Scene Stealer	Kat Graham	Nominated	
Teen Choice Awards	2015	Choice TV: Villain	Chris Wood	Nominated	
Teen Choice Awards	2015	Choice TV Actor: Fantasy/Sci-Fi	Ian Somerhalder	Nominated	
Teen Choice Awards	2015	Choice TV Actor: Fantasy/Sci-Fi	Paul Wesley	Nominated	
Teen Choice Awards	2015	Choice TV Actress: Fantasy/Sci-Fi	Candice Accola	Nominated	
Teen Choice Awards	2015	Choice TV Actress: Fantasy/Sci-Fi	Nina Dobrev	Won	
Teen Choice Awards	2015	Choice TV Show: Fantasy/Sci-Fi	The Vampire Diaries	Won	
Teen Choice Awards	2016	Choice TV: Chemistry	Kat Graham and Ian Somerhalder	Nominated	
Teen Choice Awards	2016	Choice TV: Liplock	Candice King and Paul Wesley	Nominated	
Teen Choice Awards	2016	Choice TV Actor: Fantasy/Sci-Fi	Ian Somerhalder	Nominated	
Teen Choice Awards	2016	Choice TV Actor: Fantasy/Sci-Fi	Paul Wesley	Nominated	
Teen Choice Awards	2016	Choice TV Actress: Fantasy/Sci-Fi	Kat Graham	Nominated	
Teen Choice Awards	2016	Choice TV Actress: Fantasy/Sci-Fi	Candice King	Nominated	
Teen Choice Awards	2016	Choice TV Show: Fantasy/Sci-Fi	The Vampire Diaries	Nominated	
Teen Choice Awards	2017	Choice TV Actor: Fantasy/Sci-Fi	Ian Somerhalder	Nominated	
Teen Choice Awards	2017	Choice TV Actress: Fantasy/Sci-Fi	Kat Graham	Won	
Teen Choice Awards	2017	Choice TV Show: Fantasy/Sci-Fi	The Vampire Diaries	Won	
Young Hollywood Awards	2010	Cast to Watch	Nina Dobrev, Paul Wesley and Ian Somerhalder	Won	
Young Hollywood Awards	2010	Making Their Mark	Nina Dobrev	Won	
Young Hollywood Awards	2014	Best Cast Chemistry – TV	The Vampire Diaries	Nominated	
Young Hollywood Awards	2014	Best Threesome	Nina Dobrev, Paul Wesley and Ian Somerhalder	Won	
Young Hollywood Awards	2014	Fan Favorite Actor – Female	Nina Dobrev	Nominated	
