= List of accolades received by Frozen 2 =

Frozen 2 accolades
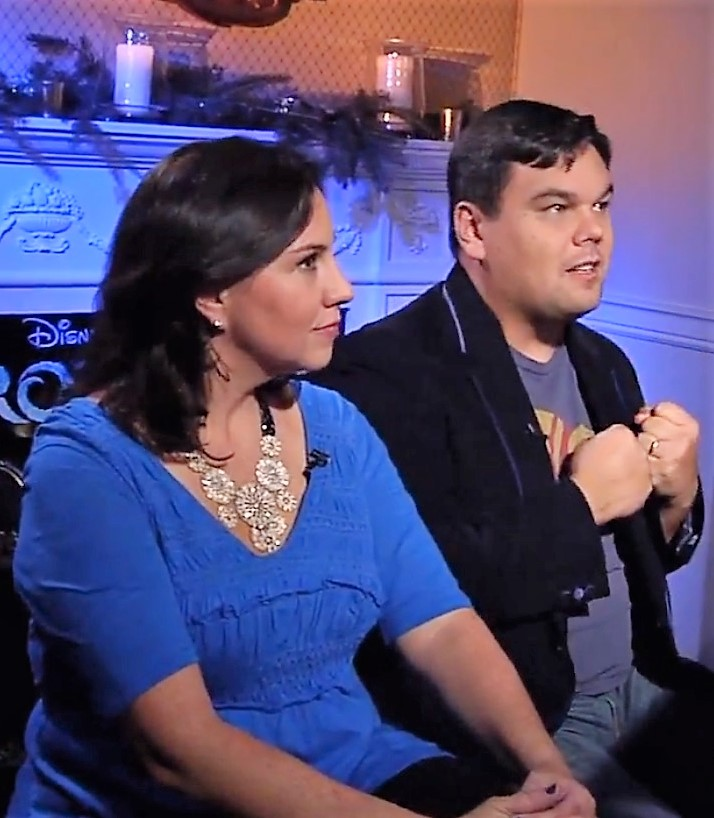
- Kristen Anderson-Lopez and Robert Lopez garnered many accolades for composing the song "Into the Unknown".
Awards and nominations
| Award | Wins | Nominations |
| Academy Awards | 0 | 1 |
| Alliance of Women Film Journalists Awards | 0 | 3 |
| American Cinema Editors Awards | 0 | 1 |
| American Music Awards | 0 | 1 |
| Annie Awards | 2 | 8 |
| Art Directors Guild Awards | 0 | 1 |
| Artios Awards | 0 | 1 |
| Austin Film Critics Association Awards | 0 | 1 |
| Billboard Music Awards | 1 | 1 |
| British Academy Film Awards | 0 | 1 |
| Chicago Film Critics Association Awards | 0 | 1 |
| Cinema Audio Society Awards | 0 | 1 |
| Critics' Choice Movie Awards | 0 | 2 |
| Detroit Film Critics Society Awards | 0 | 1 |
| Florida Film Critics Circle Awards | 0 | 1 |
| Georgia Film Critics Association Awards | 0 | 2 |
| Golden Globe Awards | 0 | 2 |
| Golden Reel Awards | 0 | 2 |
| Golden Trailer Awards | 1 | 3 |
| Grammy Awards | 0 | 2 |
| Guild of Music Supervisors Awards | 0 | 2 |
| Hollywood Critics Association Awards | 0 | 2 |
| Hollywood Music in Media Awards | 0 | 2 |
| Houston Film Critics Society Awards | 0 | 2 |
| Humanitas Prize | 1 | 1 |
| International Film Music Critics Association Awards | 0 | 1 |
| Lumiere Awards | 3 | 3 |
| NAACP Image Awards | 0 | 1 |
| National Film & TV Awards | 0 | 2 |
| Nickelodeon Kids' Choice Awards | 2 | 4 |
| Online Film Critics Society Awards | 0 | 1 |
| Producers Guild of America Awards | 0 | 1 |
| The ReFrame Stamp | 1 | 1 |
| Satellite Awards | 0 | 1 |
| Saturn Awards | 0 | 1 |
| Seattle Film Critics Society Awards | 0 | 1 |
| Society of Composers & Lyricists Awards | 0 | 1 |
| St. Louis Film Critics Association Awards | 0 | 2 |
| Toronto Film Critics Association Awards | 0 | 1 |
| Visual Effects Society Awards | 1 | 4 |
| Washington D.C. Area Film Critics Association Awards | 0 | 2 |

Totals (Note: Certain award groups do not simply award one winner. They acknowledge several different recipients, have runners-up, and have third place. Since this is a specific recognition and is different from losing an award, runner-up mentions are considered wins in this award tally. For simplification and to avoid errors, each award in this list has been presumed to have had a prior nomination.)
- Wins: 12
- Nominations: 72

Frozen 2 is a 2019 American animated musical fantasy film produced by Walt Disney Animation Studios and released by Walt Disney Pictures as the sequel to Frozen (2013). Produced by Peter Del Vecho, it was directed by Chris Buck and Jennifer Lee from a screenplay by Lee. The directors co-wrote the story with Marc Smith, Kristen Anderson-Lopez, and Robert Lopez. The film stars the voices of Kristen Bell, Idina Menzel, Josh Gad, and Jonathan Groff. Set three years after the first film, Frozen 2 follows sisters Anna and Elsa, and their companions Kristoff, Sven, and Olaf as they travel to an enchanted forest to unravel the origin of Elsa's magical power.

Frozen 2 premiered in Hollywood, Los Angeles, on November 7, 2019, and was released on November 22. Produced on a budget of $150 million, it grossed $1.453 billion worldwide, finishing its theatrical run as the third-highest-grossing film of 2019, the tenth-highest-grossing film of all time, and the second-highest-grossing animated film of all time. On the review aggregator website Rotten Tomatoes, the film holds an approval rating of 77% based on 336 reviews.

Frozen 2 garnered awards and nominations in various categories. It received a nomination for Best Original Song ("Into the Unknown") at the 92nd Academy Awards. The film received eight nominations at the 46th Annie Awards, including Best Animated Feature and Outstanding Achievement for Writing in a Feature Production, and won Outstanding Achievement for Animated Effects in an Animated Production and Outstanding Achievement for Voice Acting in an Animated Feature Production. At the 73rd British Academy Film Awards, it was nominated for Best Animated Film. The film and its song "Into the Unknown" both received their nominations at the 25th Critics' Choice Awards and the 77th Golden Globe Awards.

== Accolades ==
Accolades received by Frozen 2
| Award | Date of ceremony | Category | Recipient(s) | Result | Ref. |
|---|---|---|---|---|---|
| Academy Awards | February 9, 2020 | Best Original Song | Kristen Anderson-Lopez and Robert Lopez for "Into the Unknown" | Nominated | |
| Alliance of Women Film Journalists Awards | January 10, 2020 | Best Animated Feature | Frozen 2 | Nominated | |
| Alliance of Women Film Journalists Awards | January 10, 2020 | Best Animated Female | Kristen Bell | Nominated | |
| Alliance of Women Film Journalists Awards | January 10, 2020 | Best Animated Female | Idina Menzel | Nominated | |
| American Cinema Editors Awards | January 17, 2020 | Best Edited Animated Feature Film | Jeff Draheim | Nominated | |
| American Music Awards | November 22, 2020 | Top Soundtrack | Frozen 2 | Nominated | |
| Annie Awards | January 25, 2020 | Best Animated Feature | Peter Del Vecho | Nominated | |
| Annie Awards | January 25, 2020 | Outstanding Achievement for Animated Effects in an Animated Production | Benjamin Fiske, Alex Moaveni, Jesse Erickson, Dimitre Berberov, and Kee Nam Suong | Won | |
| Annie Awards | January 25, 2020 | Outstanding Achievement for Character Animation in an Animated Feature Production | Andrew Ford | Nominated | |
| Annie Awards | January 25, 2020 | Outstanding Achievement for Character Design in an Animated Feature Production | Bill Schwab | Nominated | |
| Annie Awards | January 25, 2020 | Outstanding Achievement for Directing in an Animated Feature Production | Jennifer Lee and Chris Buck | Nominated | |
| Annie Awards | January 25, 2020 | Outstanding Achievement for Music in an Animated Feature Production | Christophe Beck (score), Frode Fjellheim, Kristen Anderson-Lopez, and Robert Lopez (songs) | Nominated | |
| Annie Awards | January 25, 2020 | Outstanding Achievement for Voice Acting in an Animated Feature Production | Josh Gad | Won | |
| Annie Awards | January 25, 2020 | Outstanding Achievement for Writing in an Animated Feature Production | Jennifer Lee | Nominated | |
| Art Directors Guild Awards | February 1, 2020 | Excellence in Production Design for an Animated Film | Michael Giaimo | Nominated | |
| Artios Awards | January 30, 2020 | Animation | Jamie Sparer Roberts and Sarah Raoufpur (Associate) | Nominated | |
| Austin Film Critics Association Awards | January 7, 2020 | Best Animated Film | Frozen 2 | Nominated | |
| Billboard Music Awards | October 14, 2020 | Top Soundtrack | Frozen 2 | Won | |
| British Academy Film Awards | February 2, 2020 | Best Animated Film | Chris Buck, Jennifer Lee, and Peter Del Vecho | Nominated | |
| Chicago Film Critics Association Awards | December 14, 2019 | Best Animated Film | Frozen 2 | Nominated | |
| Cinema Audio Society Awards | January 25, 2020 | Outstanding Achievement in Sound Mixing for a Motion Picture – Animated | Paul McGrath, David E. Fluhr, Gabriel Guy, David Boucher, Greg Hayes, Doc Kane, and Scott Curtis | Nominated | |
| Critics' Choice Movie Awards | January 12, 2020 | Best Animated Feature | Frozen 2 | Nominated | |
| Critics' Choice Movie Awards | January 12, 2020 | Best Song | Kristen Anderson-Lopez and Robert Lopez for "Into the Unknown" | Nominated | |
| Detroit Film Critics Society Awards | December 9, 2019 | Best Animated Feature | Frozen 2 | Nominated | |
| Florida Film Critics Circle Awards | December 23, 2019 | Best Animated Film | Frozen 2 | Nominated | |
| Georgia Film Critics Association Awards | January 10, 2020 | Best Animated Film | Frozen 2 | Nominated | |
| Georgia Film Critics Association Awards | January 10, 2020 | Best Original Song | Kristen Anderson-Lopez and Robert Lopez for "Into the Unknown" | Nominated | |
| Golden Globe Awards | January 5, 2020 | Best Animated Feature Film | Frozen 2 | Nominated | |
| Golden Globe Awards | January 5, 2020 | Best Original Song | Kristen Anderson-Lopez and Robert Lopez for "Into the Unknown" | Nominated | |
| Golden Reel Awards | January 19, 2020 | Outstanding Achievement in Sound Editing – Musical for Feature Film | Earl Ghaffari, Fernand Bos, and Kendall Demarest | Nominated | |
| Golden Reel Awards | January 19, 2020 | Outstanding Achievement in Sound Editing – Sound Effects, Foley, Dialogue and ADR for Animated Feature Film | Odin Benitez, Eliot Connors, Angelo Palazzo, Stephen P. Robinson, Jeff Sawyer, Harrison Meyle, Christopher Bonis, Earl Ghaffari, Russell Topal, Fernand Bos, Kendall Demarest, Scott Curtis, Shelley Roden, and John Roesch | Nominated | |
| Golden Trailer Awards | July 22, 2021 | Best Animation/Family | "Spirit/Adventure" (MOCEAN) | Nominated | |
| Golden Trailer Awards | July 22, 2021 | Best Animation/Family TV Spot | "Chant" (The Hive) | Won | |
| Golden Trailer Awards | July 22, 2021 | Best Home Ent Animation/Family | "Together" (Aspect Ratio) | Nominated | |
| Grammy Awards | March 14, 2021 | Best Compilation Soundtrack for Visual Media | Frozen 2 – Various Artists | Nominated | |
| Grammy Awards | March 14, 2021 | Best Song Written for Visual Media | Kristen Anderson-Lopez and Robert Lopez for "Into the Unknown" | Nominated | |
| Guild of Music Supervisors Awards | February 6, 2020 | Best Music Supervision for Films Budgeted Over $25 Million | Frozen 2 | Nominated | |
| Guild of Music Supervisors Awards | February 6, 2020 | Best Song Written and/or Recorded Created for a Film | Kristen Anderson-Lopez, Robert Lopez, Idina Menzel, Aurora, and Tom MacDougall for "Into the Unknown" | Nominated | |
| Hollywood Critics Association Awards | January 9, 2020 | Best Animated Film | Frozen 2 | Nominated | |
| Hollywood Critics Association Awards | January 9, 2020 | Best Original Song | "Into the Unknown" | Nominated | |
| Hollywood Music in Media Awards | November 20, 2019 | Original Score in an Animated Film | Christophe Beck | Nominated | |
| Hollywood Music in Media Awards | November 20, 2019 | Original Song in an Animated Film | Kristen Anderson-Lopez, Robert Lopez, and Idina Menzel for "Into the Unknown" | Nominated | |
| Houston Film Critics Society Awards | January 2, 2020 | Best Animated Film | Frozen 2 | Nominated | |
| Houston Film Critics Society Awards | January 2, 2020 | Best Original Song | "Into the Unknown" | Nominated | |
| Humanitas Prize | January 24, 2020 | Family Feature Film | Frozen 2 | Won | |
| International Film Music Critics Association Awards | February 20, 2020 | Best Original Score for an Animated Film | Christophe Beck | Nominated | |
| Lumiere Awards | January 22, 2020 | Best Feature Film – Animation | Frozen 2 | Won | |
| Lumiere Awards | January 22, 2020 | Best Original Score | "Into the Unknown" | Won | |
| Lumiere Awards | January 22, 2020 | Best Use of High Dynamic Range – Animated | Frozen 2 | Won | |
| NAACP Image Awards | February 22, 2020 | Outstanding Character Voice-Over Performance | Sterling K. Brown | Nominated | |
| National Film & TV Awards | December 3, 2019 | Best Animated Film | Frozen 2 | Nominated | |
| National Film & TV Awards | December 3, 2019 | Best Performance in an Animated Movie | Kristen Bell | Nominated | |
| Nickelodeon Kids' Choice Awards | May 2, 2020 | Favorite Animated Movie | Frozen 2 | Won | |
| Nickelodeon Kids' Choice Awards | May 2, 2020 | Favorite Female Voice from an Animated Movie | Kristen Bell | Nominated | |
| Nickelodeon Kids' Choice Awards | May 2, 2020 | Favorite Female Voice from an Animated Movie | Idina Menzel | Nominated | |
| Nickelodeon Kids' Choice Awards | May 2, 2020 | Favorite Male Voice from an Animated Movie | Josh Gad | Won | |
| Online Film Critics Society Awards | January 6, 2020 | Best Animated Film | Frozen 2 | Nominated | |
| Producers Guild of America Awards | January 18, 2020 | Best Animated Motion Picture | Peter Del Vecho | Nominated | |
| The ReFrame Stamp | February 26, 2020 | 2019 Top 100-Grossing Narrative Feature Recipients | Frozen 2 | Won (Note: This award does not have a single winner, but recognizes multiple films.) | |
| Satellite Awards | December 19, 2019 | Best Original Song | Kristen Anderson-Lopez and Robert Lopez for "Into the Unknown" | Nominated | |
| Saturn Awards | October 26, 2021 | Best Animated Film | Frozen 2 | Nominated | |
| Seattle Film Critics Society Awards | December 16, 2019 | Best Animated Feature | Frozen 2 | Nominated | |
| Society of Composers & Lyricists Awards | January 7, 2020 | Outstanding Original Song for Visual Media | Kristen Anderson-Lopez and Robert Lopez for "Into the Unknown" | Nominated | |
| St. Louis Film Critics Association Awards | December 15, 2019 | Best Animated Feature | Frozen 2 | Nominated | |
| St. Louis Film Critics Association Awards | December 15, 2019 | Best Soundtrack | Frozen 2 | Nominated | |
| Toronto Film Critics Association Awards | December 8, 2019 | Best Animated Film | Frozen 2 | Nominated | |
| Visual Effects Society Awards | January 29, 2020 | Outstanding Visual Effects in an Animated Feature | Steve Goldberg, Peter Del Vecho, Mark Hammel, and Michael Giaimo | Nominated | |
| Visual Effects Society Awards | January 29, 2020 | Outstanding Animated Character in an Animated Feature | Svetla Radivoeva, Marc Bryant, Richard E. Lehmann, and Cameron Black for "The Water Nøkk" | Nominated | |
| Visual Effects Society Awards | January 29, 2020 | Outstanding Created Environment in an Animated Feature | Samy Segura, Jay V. Jackson, Justin Cram, and Scott Townsend for "Giants' Gorge" | Nominated | |
| Visual Effects Society Awards | January 29, 2020 | Outstanding Effects Simulations in an Animated Feature | Erin V. Ramos, Scott Townsend, Thomas Wickes, and Rattanin Sirinaruemarn | Won | |
| Washington D.C. Area Film Critics Association Awards | December 8, 2019 | Best Animated Feature | Frozen 2 | Nominated | |
| Washington D.C. Area Film Critics Association Awards | December 8, 2019 | Best Voice Performance | Kristen Bell | Nominated | |

== See also ==
- List of accolades received by Frozen (2013 film)
