= Accolades received by Frozen =

Accolades received by Frozen may refer to:

- Accolades received by Frozen (1997 film)
- Accolades received by Frozen (2005 film)
- Accolades received by Frozen (2007 film)
- Accolades received by Frozen (2010 American film)
- Accolades received by Frozen (2013 film)

== See also ==
- Frozen (disambiguation)#Films
