= Frozen 2 =

2019 animated Disney film

- Theatrical release poster
- Directed by: Chris Buck; Jennifer Lee
- Screenplay by: Jennifer Lee
- Story by: Jennifer Lee; Chris Buck; Marc Smith; Kristen Anderson-Lopez; Robert Lopez
- Produced by: Peter Del Vecho
- Starring: Idina Menzel; Kristen Bell; Josh Gad; Jonathan Groff
- Cinematography: Mohit Kallianpur
- Edited by: Jeff Draheim
- Music by: Christophe Beck (score); Robert Lopez (songs); Kristen Anderson-Lopez (songs)
- Production company: Walt Disney Animation Studios
- Distributed by: Walt Disney Studios; Motion Pictures (Note: Distributed under the Walt Disney Pictures banner.)
- Release dates: November 7, 2019 (Dolby Theatre); November 22, 2019 (United States)
- Running time: 103 minutes
- Country: United States
- Language: English
- Budget: $150 million
- Box office: $1.453 billion

Frozen 2 (stylized as Frozen II) is a 2019 American animated musical fantasy film produced by Walt Disney Animation Studios. The second film in the Frozen franchise, following the 2013 film, it was directed by Chris Buck and Jennifer Lee and written by Lee, from a story they conceived with Marc Smith, Kristen Anderson-Lopez, and Robert Lopez. It stars the voices of Idina Menzel, Kristen Bell, Josh Gad, and Jonathan Groff. Set three years after the events of the first film, Frozen 2 follows sisters Anna and Elsa, and their companions Kristoff, Sven, and Olaf as they travel to an enchanted forest to unravel the origin of Elsa's magical power.

Frozen 2 was greenlit in March 2015 after a company debate about whether it would be perceived as inferior to the original. It used more-complex, enhanced animation technology compared to the first film, and was an interdepartmental collaboration. Anderson-Lopez and Lopez returned as the film's songwriters, and Christophe Beck again composed the score. The film was translated into 46 languages and was accompanied by Into the Unknown: Making Frozen 2, a documentary series.

Frozen 2 premiered in Hollywood, Los Angeles, on November 7, 2019, and was released in the United States on November 22. It received generally positive reviews from critics, although it was considered inferior to its predecessor. The film grossed more than $1.453 billion worldwide, finishing its theatrical run as the third-highest-grossing film of 2019, the tenth-highest-grossing film in history, and the second-highest-grossing animated film of all time. It also held the title of the highest-grossing worldwide opening for an animated film for three years. Frozen 2 received a nomination for Best Original Song at the 92nd Academy Awards, among numerous other accolades. A sequel, Frozen 3, is scheduled to be released November 24, 2027.

== Plot ==
King Agnarr of Arendelle tells his daughters Elsa and Anna that their grandfather, King Runeard, forged a treaty with the neighboring tribe of Northuldra by building a dam in their homeland, the Enchanted Forest. A fight occurred, resulting in Runeard's death and enraging the forest's classical elements of earth, fire, water, and air. The elements disappeared, and a wall of mist trapped everyone in the forest; Agnarr barely escaped, helped by an unknown savior.

Three years after her coronation, (Note: As depicted in Frozen (2013)) Elsa celebrates autumn in the kingdom with Anna, the snowman Olaf, the iceman Kristoff, and Kristoff's reindeer Sven. One night, Elsa hears a mysterious voice calling her. She follows it, unintentionally awakening the elemental spirits, who are forcing everyone in the kingdom to evacuate. The Rock Troll colony arrives, and Grand Pabbie tells the sisters they must set things right by uncovering the truth about the past. Elsa, Anna, Olaf, Kristoff and Sven follow the mysterious voice, and travel to the Enchanted Forest.

The mist parts at Elsa's touch, while the air spirit appears as a tornado, catching everyone in its vortex until Elsa stops it by turning the vortex into ice sculptures that show images from their father's past. Elsa also befriends the fire spirit, who is an agitated magical salamander. They later encounter the Northuldra and a troop of Arendellian soldiers who are still in conflict with one another. Anna and Elsa arrange a truce between the soldiers and the Northuldra after discovering that their mother, Queen Iduna, was a Northuldran who had saved the Arendellian Agnarr. The Northuldra tell them about a fifth spirit, who is meant to reunite the people with the magic of nature.

While Kristoff and Sven stay with the Northuldra, Elsa, Anna, and Olaf continue north. They find their parents' wrecked ship and a map with a route to Ahtohallan, a mythical river said to explain the past. Believing she should continue alone, Elsa sends Anna and Olaf to safety despite Anna's protests. She encounters and tames the Nøkk, the water spirit who guards the sea to Ahtohallan. Elsa discovers that the voice calling to her is the memory of young Iduna and that her powers are a gift from nature because of Iduna's selfless saving of Agnarr. Venturing into the most dangerous part of Ahtohallan, she learns that the dam was built as a ruse to reduce Northuldran resources because of Runeard's contempt for the tribe's connection with magic, and that he began the conflict by murdering the Northuldran leader in cold blood. Elsa relays this information to Anna before freezing solid, which in turn causes Olaf to fade away from existence.

Upon discovering the truth, Anna concludes that the dam must be destroyed for peace to be restored and the forest to be freed. She awakens the earth spirit, Jötunn, and lures it towards the dam. The massive rock giants hurl boulders, destroying the dam and sending a flood down the fjord towards the kingdom. Elsa thaws and rides the Nøkk to Arendelle, where she freezes the flood and saves the kingdom. As the mist disappears, she rejoins Anna and revives Olaf, before Kristoff proposes to Anna. Realizing she is the fifth spirit herself, Elsa explains to Anna that they are the bridge between the people and the magical spirits. Elsa abdicates the throne to Anna and becomes the protector of the Enchanted Forest, visiting Arendelle regularly with peace restored.

In a post-credits scene, Olaf visits Elsa's ice palace and recounts the events to Marshmallow, the snow giant created by Elsa as palace guard, and the Snowgies, miniature snowmen inadvertently generated by Elsa from sneezing. (Note: As depicted in Frozen Fever (2015))

== Voice cast ==
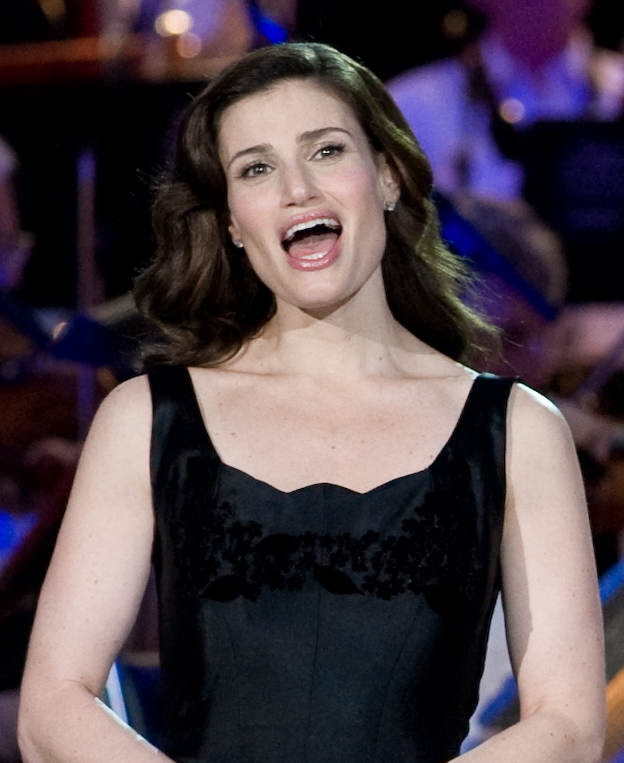
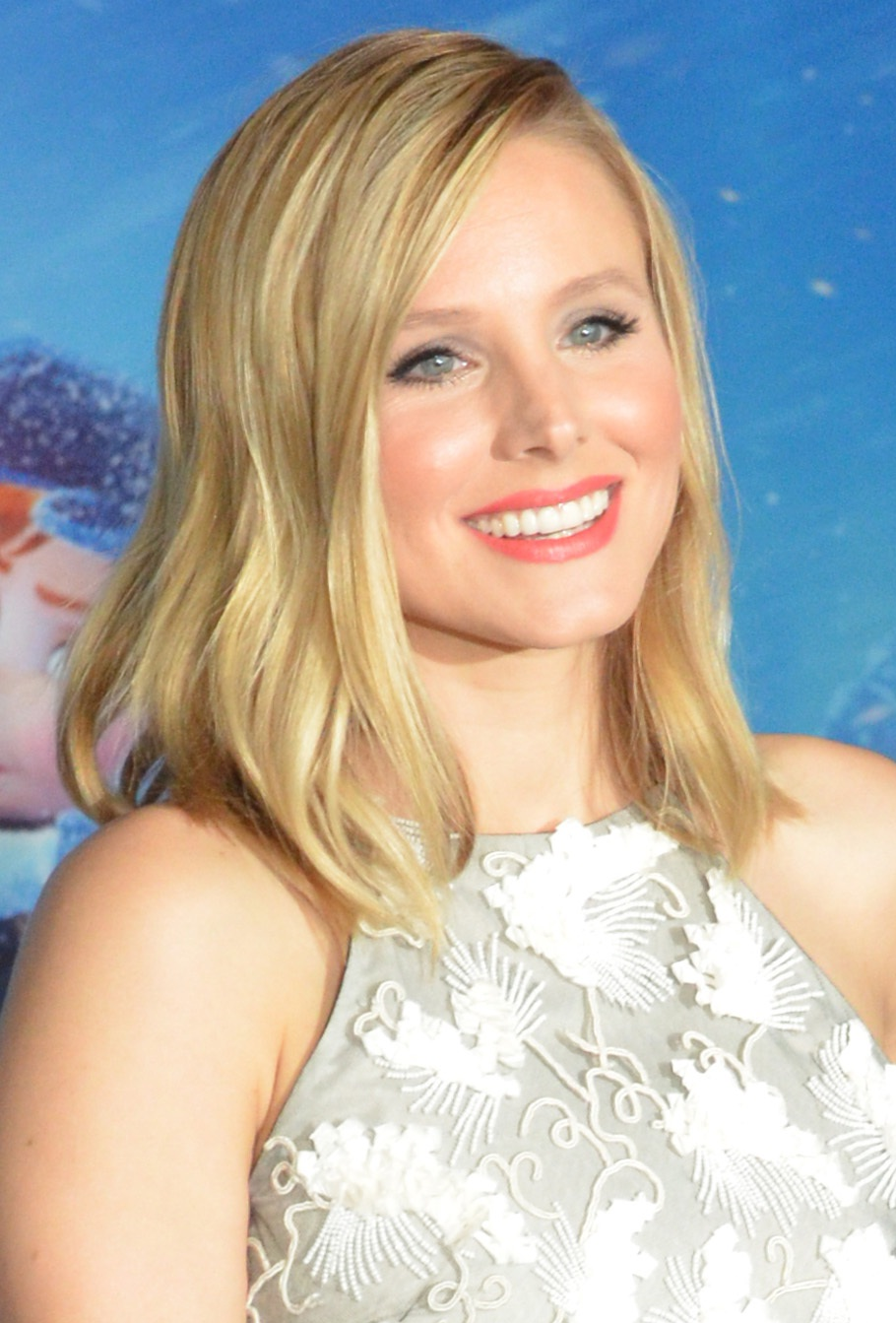
Idina Menzel (Elsa) in 2008 and Kristen Bell (Anna) in 2013
- Idina Menzel as Elsa, queen of Arendelle and Anna's older sister, who has magical ice powers
  - Mattea Conforti and Eva Bella as young Elsa
- Kristen Bell as Anna, princess of Arendelle and Elsa's younger sister, who becomes queen of Arendelle after Elsa's abdication
  - Hadley Gannaway and Livvy Stubenrauch as young Anna
- Josh Gad as Olaf, a snowman created by Elsa
- Jonathan Groff as Kristoff, an ice harvester and Anna's boyfriend. Groff also voices Sven, Kristoff's reindeer and several other reindeers

Frozen 2 also features Martha Plimpton as the Northuldra chief Yelena and Sterling K. Brown as the Arendelle lieutenant Mattias. Jason Ritter voices Ryder, a member of Northuldra; and Rachel Matthews voices Honeymaren, Ryder's sister who also resides in the Enchanted Forest.

Evan Rachel Wood voices Iduna (Elsa and Anna's mother), and Delaney Rose Stein voices the young Iduna. Alfred Molina voices Agnarr (Elsa and Anna's father), and Jackson Stein voices young Agnarr. Jeremy Sisto voices Runeard (Agnarr's father and Elsa and Anna's grandfather); Ciarán Hinds voices the Rock Troll head Pabbie; and Aurora is "the voice" (a call to Elsa). Alan Tudyk voices a guard, a Northuldran leader, and an Arendellian soldier. Paul Briggs reprised his role in the post-credits scene as Marshmallow, a snow monster created by Elsa.

== Production ==
=== Conception ===
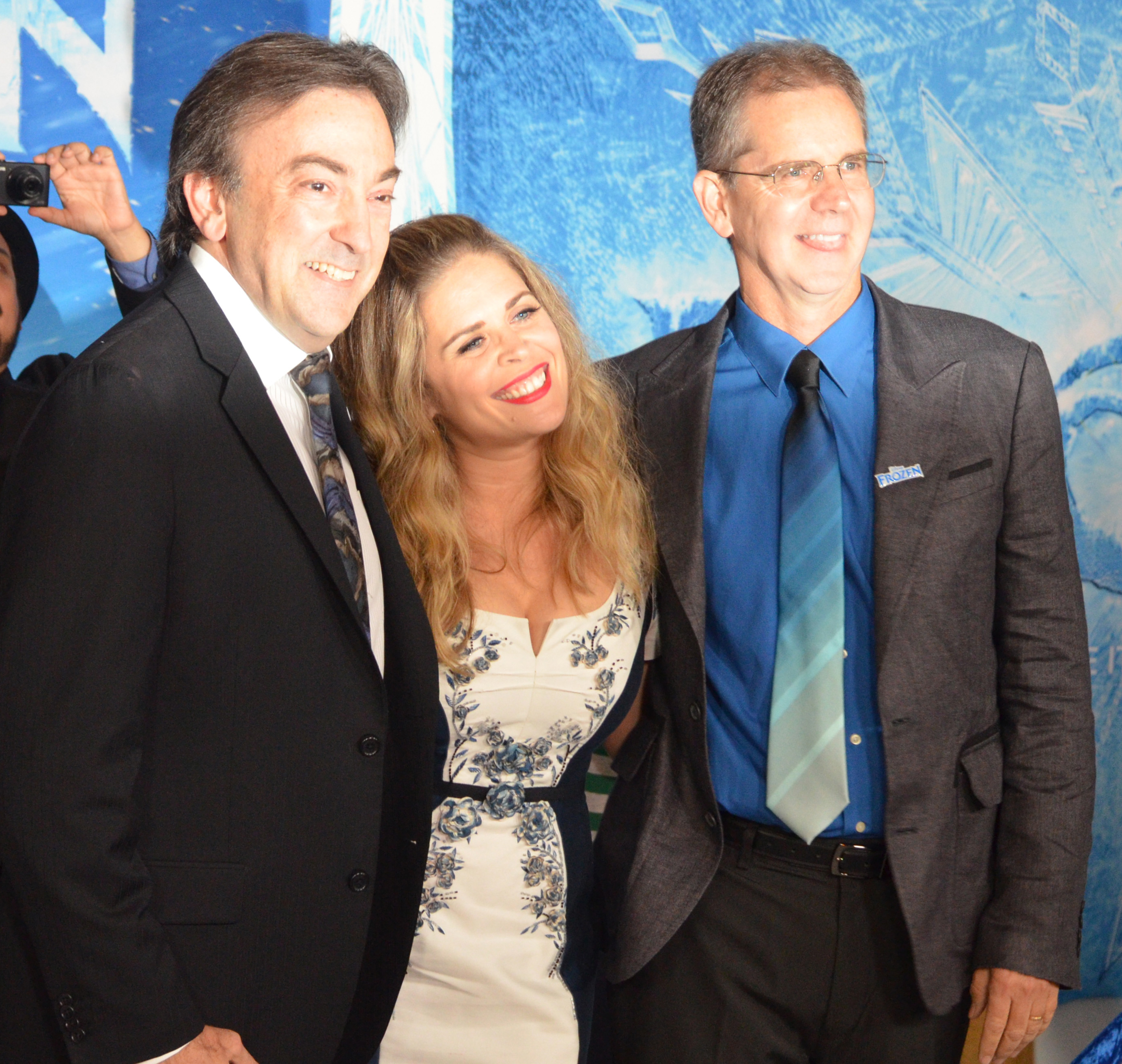
(left to right) Producer Peter Del Vecho, director and writer Jennifer Lee, and director Chris Buck at Frozen's 2013 premiere

Producer Peter Del Vecho said on March 31, 2014, that he, Chris Buck, and Jennifer Lee collaborated well, and he envisioned another Frozen-related project. The following month, Walt Disney Studios chairman Alan F. Horn said that a sequel would not be immediately forthcoming because the studio was focusing on a Broadway musical adaptation of Frozen. In a May 2014 CNBC interview with David Faber, the Walt Disney Company CEO Bob Iger said that the company would not force the development of a sequel, because it was concerned about not living up to the first film. Iger said that the Frozen franchise "is something that is kind of forever for the company", similar to The Lion King.

On June 10, 2014, Lee confirmed that Walt Disney Studios CCO John Lasseter had authorized her and Buck to explore a possible sequel. While working on the short film Frozen Fever (2015), they realized that they missed the characters. Meanwhile, Del Vecho had been asked by fans about Frozen's future. Lee, Buck, and Del Vecho discussed the possibility of a sequel. Buck later said, "The one thing that we did right away was to figure out what would be satisfying for Anna and Elsa at the end of the movie." They decided on ending the sequel with Anna becoming the queen of Arendelle, while Elsa would be "free".

=== Development ===
At the Walt Disney Animation Studio, as with Pixar, when we do a sequel, it is because the filmmakers who created the original have created an idea that is so good that it's worthy of these characters.

— John Lasseter, announcing Frozen 2

Iger, Lasseter, and actor Josh Gad announced at Disney's March 12, 2015, annual shareholders' meeting in San Francisco that Frozen 2, a full-length sequel, was in development; Buck and Lee would return as directors, and Del Vecho as producer. The production team traveled to Norway, Finland, and Iceland for background research; they decided to make Elsa a "mythic hero" with magic ice powers and Anna a "fairytale hero" who lives in a magical world but has no magic powers. They concluded that the first film successfully combined the two elements. Allison Schroeder was hired to assist Lee with the script in August 2018 after Lee succeeded Lasseter as Disney Animation's CCO; Lee was credited as the film's screenwriter, and Schroeder was credited with additional screenplay material. The film's story contributions were made by Lee, Buck, Marc Smith, Kristen Anderson-Lopez, and Robert Lopez. Overall, the budget was approximately $150 million.

Voice recording began in September 2017, although Menzel started a couple of weeks later due to a concert tour. That month, Gad announced his role in the sequel with Buck, Lee, Del Vecho, and Lasseter. In July 2018, Variety reported that Wood and Brown were in talks to join the cast. Their roles were later disclosed as Iduna and Lieutenant Destin Mattias. Wood was cast because her voice resembled Menzel and Bell's. The voice of Agnarr was changed from Maurice LaMarche to Molina. The Voice's four-note call, derived from the Latin sequence "Dies irae", is delivered in a manner resembling the Scandinavian music form kulning.

Frozen 2's first completed scenes were test screened at the Annecy International Animated Film Festival in June 2019, where Becky Bresee and effects-animation head Marlon West said that the film was "still in production, with seven weeks of animation to be completed and 10 weeks of special effects". The filmmakers collaborated with Sámi experts on the depiction of the Northuldra tribe with Verdett, an advisory group which was the result of an agreement between the Walt Disney Company, the transnational Saami Council, and the Sámi parliaments of Finland, Norway, and Sweden. Anderson-Lopez confirmed that Elsa would have no female love interest in the film, despite some fans' desire for one. Lee later explained to The New York Times reporter Maureen Dowd that Elsa's main audience did not seem ready for such a relationship. Lee also stated in a press conference that Frozen 2 would not acquire elements from the television series Once Upon a Time's Frozen storyline, which was part of its fourth season.

Frozen 2 underwent significant revisions after its first test screening in San Diego; Disney Animation discovered that although adults liked the film, children found it hard to follow. The production team realized they needed to clarify the identity of the Voice and the point of Elsa's transformation, and add more comedy and shots of Bruni (the fire salamander). A scene of expository dialogue in which the lead characters explained to the people trapped in the Enchanted Forest why they had come there was replaced with Olaf's humorous recap of Frozen. Due to the changes, the animators needed to create 61 new shots and redo another 35. An undisclosed number of shots were cut from the finished film; about a dozen animators and artists worked for two months on an elaborate resurrection scene for Olaf before it was cut.

The last major animation scene completed before the production team locked the picture was "Show Yourself", the musical number in which Elsa enters Ahtohallan and learns all the secrets she has been seeking. According to Del Vecho, the scene "required all of the resources at the studio" to get the film done on time. Lopez said that the first draft of "Show Yourself" was very different from its final version. Megan Harding directed an official documentary series on the production of Frozen 2, which depicted the process of Del Vecho and Lopez determining The Voice's identity. Once the production team settled on Queen Iduna, the lyrics of "Show Yourself" finally began to come together, but then the studio's artists, designers, and animators needed to quickly figure out how to stage the dramatic culmination of Elsa's journey towards becoming the Snow Queen. The film was edited by Jeff Draheim.

=== Design ===
Costume and character designs underwent several revisions before they were finalized. According to designer Griselda Sastrawinata-Lemay, the process was the most intricate of any animated film. Technological advancements allowed the designer to create more-detailed outfits, with extra beads and sequins. The team used Marvelous Designer, a computer-generated imagery (CGI) program, to drape each character's clothing.

Anna's outfit was inspired by the Norwegian folk bunad, worn during the 1840s and 1850s. Typically made of wool, it had decorative embroidery. Anna lost the pigtail braid she had in Frozen because she is three years older in Frozen 2, and it was replaced by a braid across the back of her head. Aging Elsa three years was inspired by artists Alexander McQueen and Elie Saab. Saab's designs had long trains and cumbersome floor-length hemlines; the designers instead created a tailored coat with a double-panel cape and epaulettes, highlighting Elsa's strength.

The animation team used a curve-based method for the intricate embroidery. A program interpreted two-dimensional visual designs as line strokes, rendering them as curves. This allowed quick changes, minimizing manual work during design modifications. It also supported free-form stitching with threads of various widths, colors, and densities, crucial to the production of a variety of embroidery styles.

=== Animation ===
About 800 people, 80 of them animators, were involved in the production of Frozen 2. Tony Smeed and Becky Bresee were the film's heads of animation; Hyun-Min Lee replaced Bresee as supervising animator for Anna, while Wayne Unten again served as supervising animator for Elsa as he had done on Frozen. Steve Goldberg was the supervising animator for visual effects. Scott Beattie was the director of cinematography layout, while Mohit Kallianpur was the director of cinematography lighting.

Frozen 2 made use of advancements in technology, artistic performance, and skeletal animation. Before the animation began, Unten showed scenes of superheroes like Frozone to Elsa's animators as examples of what to avoid. Creating the personal flurry effect was so difficult for the animators that the directors had Elsa put a permafrost coating on Olaf in Frozen 2 instead. Elsa's graceful movements were modeled on Frozen and modern dance, particularly Martha Graham's work.

In accordance with Disney's preference for a different style for each film and the directors' and production designer's artistic vision, the multi-departmental animation team was instructed to reconstruct the characters so they were slightly different in tone and style from Frozen. They differed in "very subtle ways", with a "through line from the first movie to the second". As well as making the Enchanted Forest vegetation autumnal, the effects team applied two internally developed applications (Vegetation Asset and Fire Tree) to enhance the film's vegetation and fire animation. Lighting and special effects were applied to glacial ice, spirit magic, and memory.

The first step for the animation team was to study the screenplay and understand the characters. Blocking (creating key poses) was next, followed by CGI and layout. Effects were proposed for layout before animation process to choreograph the dam-collapse scene. Although Frozen's greatest difficulty for Frozen was the winter snow, Frozen 2 is set in fall; its main challenge was how to consistently depict the wind and "pass that downstream".

Frozen 2's animation software was influenced by the software in several other Disney films. Anna's hair was animated with Quicksilver, developed for Moana (2016) to deal with wind; for Elsa's hair, the lighting software Beast was used. A vocal coach instructed the animators on how a singer would breathe. The animators then spent about eight months creating Nøkk, which has a liquid appearance, with effects supervised by Erin Ramos. Jötunns had a long rigging process to avoid making rocks distracting. The water simulation was intended to be more realistic than in Moana. To create Gale, the wind spirit, a tool called Swoop was developed. They later received real-time feedback from the supervisors, directors, and producer.

=== Music ===
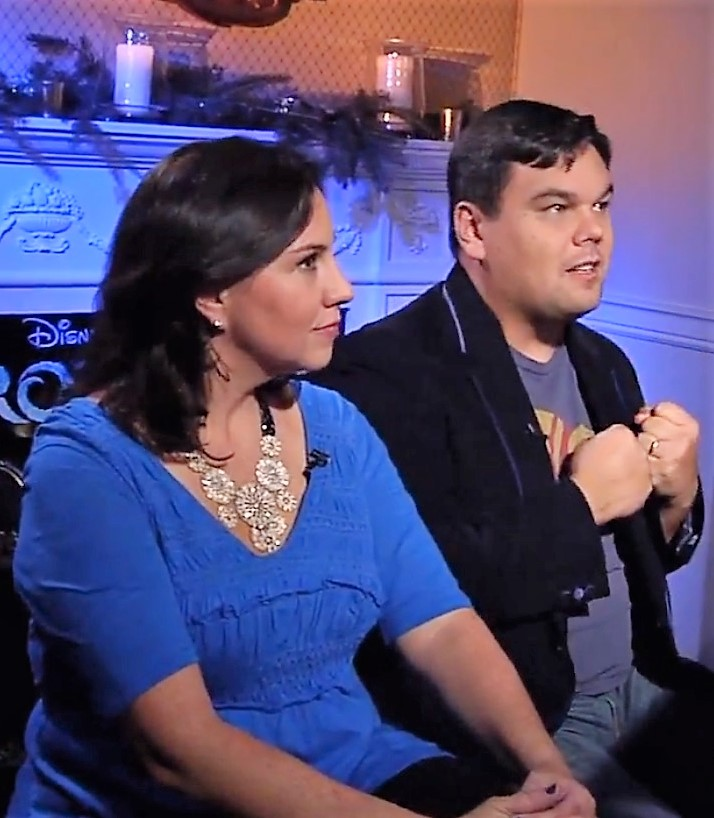
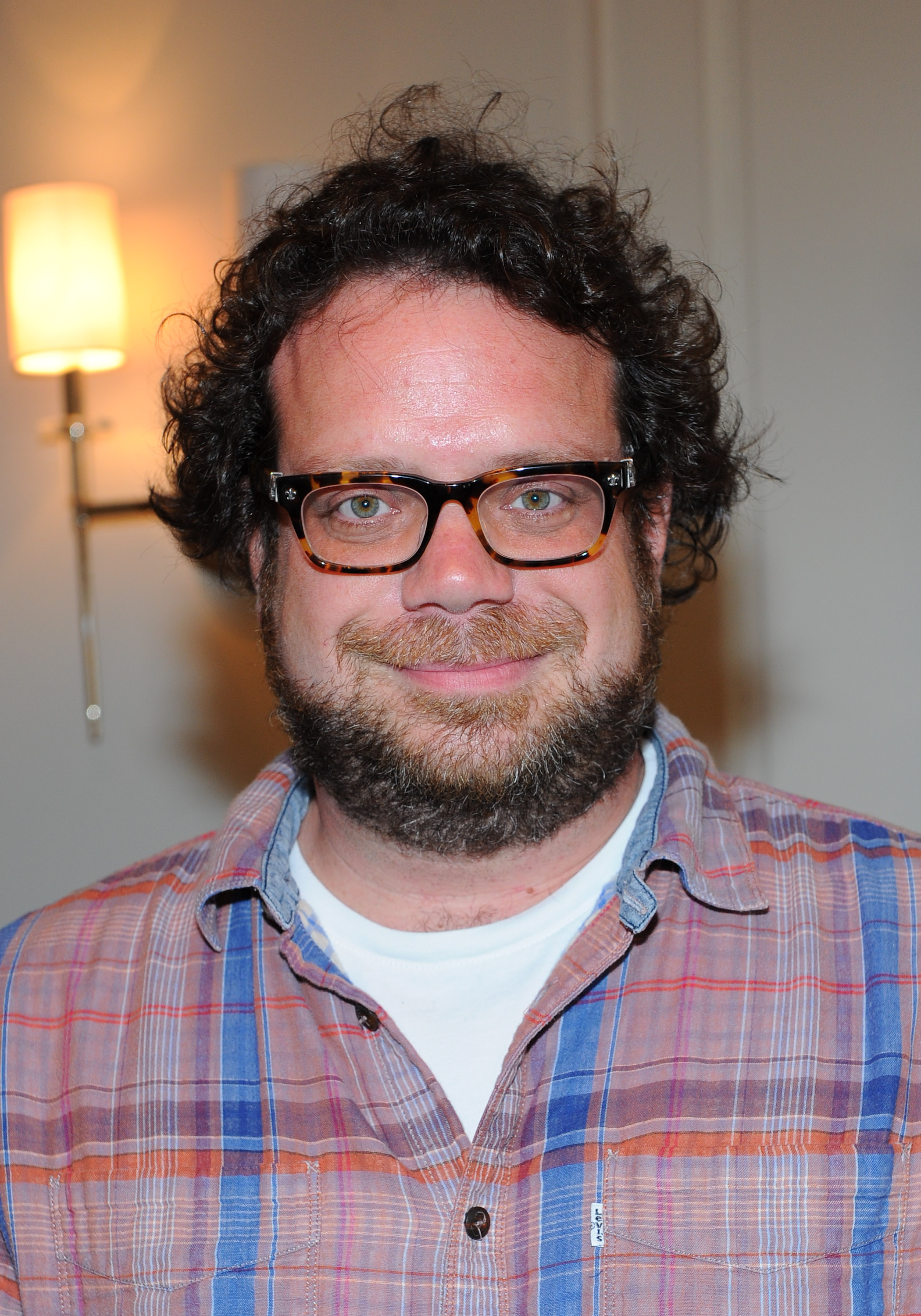
Songwriters Kristen Anderson-Lopez and Robert Lopez in 2019, and composer Christophe Beck in 2012

Lopez and Anderson-Lopez returned from Frozen to write songs for the sequel, and Christophe Beck returned as composer. The soundtrack album was released on November 15, 2019, after the release of Panic! at the Disco's version of one of the film's songs, "Into the Unknown". The seven-song album also contains a remix of "Reindeer(s) Are Better Than People" from Frozen.

Beck said that the score conveys Elsa and Anna's emotional growth, "matured and introduc[ing] more sophisticated musical concepts and thematic elements". He wanted it to reflect the film's complex, intense imagery. Anderson-Lopez described the album's theme as a "meta-story". Although Harding sent a camera crew to the Lopez home in Brooklyn to document their songwriting and composing, the composers found the crew intrusive and did most of their work off-camera.

== Thematic analysis ==
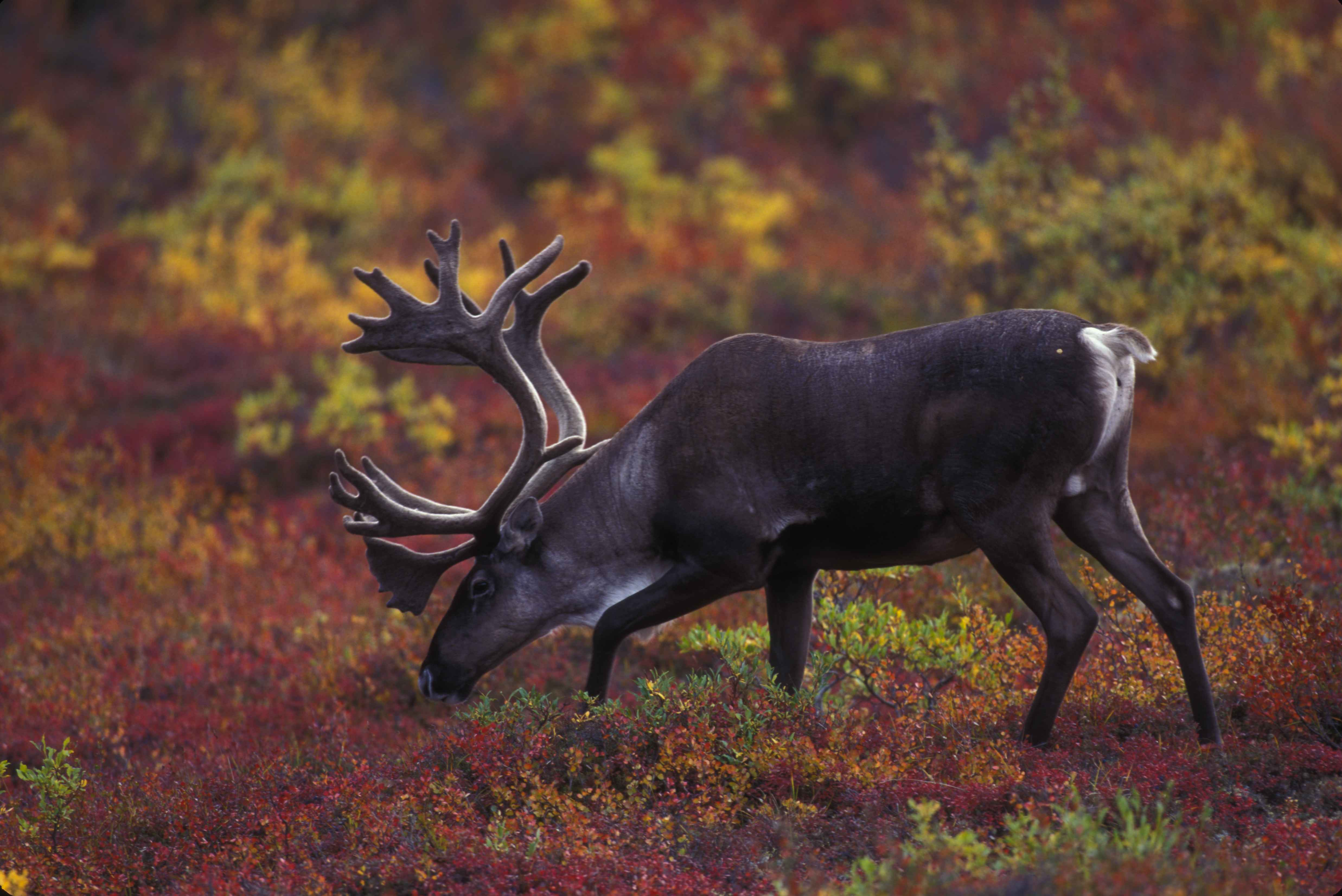
Reindeer have been venerated by the Sámi people, who consider them symbolic of Sámi strength and identity.

The indigenous Sámi people were historically associated with reindeer, and identified with the animals' strength. Trude Fonneland wrote that a female divinity emphasized female contributions with themes including unity, courage, hope, friendship, and truth. Elsa attempted to send Anna away because she was concerned about her sister's safety.

In animation, female characters embody female images as a whole. The film's female characters are emotionally diverse, motivated by social status and awakening of feminism. The elegant, noble Elsa wants to be free and live a normal life, and Anna is dreamy, cheerful and enthusiastic; both acted to defend their kingdom from danger.

Frozen 2 has been interpreted as a critique of colonialism and as advocating reparation. Before Elsa and Anna were born, their grandfather King Runeard built a dam for the Northuldra tribe. Ostensibly a gift, the dam weakens the tribe's magical power. Runeard's plot fails after he murders the leader of Northuldra and war breaks out. The forest spirits which preside over Northuldra shroud it in an impenetrable mist, preventing anyone from leaving or entering. The Northuldra are modeled on the Sámi people, indigenous to Scandinavia and northwestern Russia, who experienced discrimination as pagans reputed to be skilled in magic and witchcraft. In 1609, King Christian IV of Denmark wrote that the Sámi were adept at magic, and no mercy should be granted in cases involving Sámi sorcery. Nordic missionaries confiscated or destroyed religious items and sites and built churches to supplant Sámi shamanism.

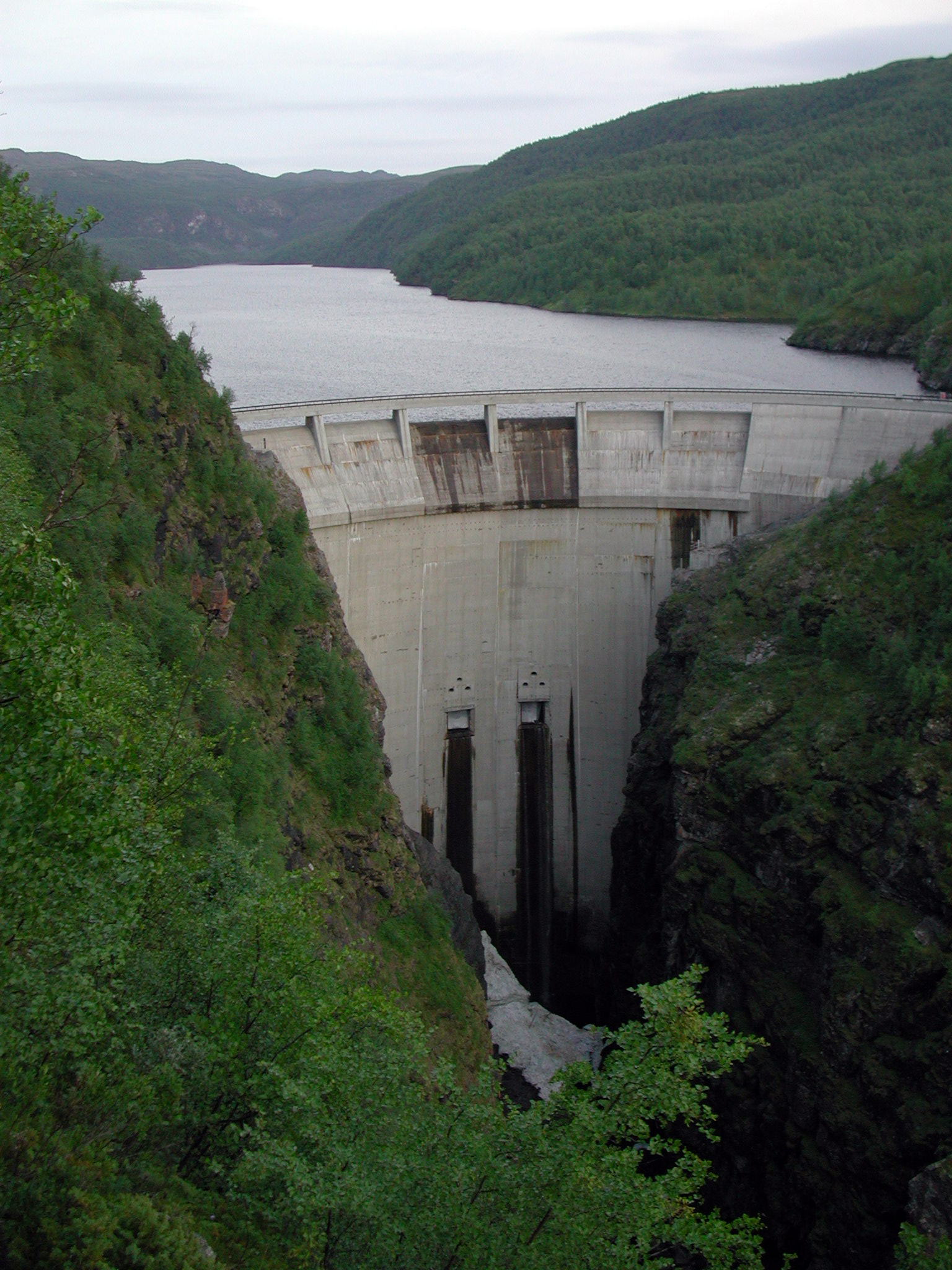
A subplot in which a dam is built on tribal land by King Runeard alludes to Norway's controversial Virdnejávr Dam.

The Northuldra dam reflects Sámi history. A hydroelectric power station was built on the Altaelva river in Norway from 1979 to 1981; the controversial Virdnejávr Dam flooded a Sámi village, disrupting traditional hunting and herding. Slate critic Inkoo Kang said that although Frozen 2 was obviously influenced by Sámi history, the Northuldra may also be interpreted as representing displaced Native Americans; Arendelle can be seen as representing the United States' colonial past, evocative of the embellished life of Pocahontas. The Northuldra are presented in an appealing way, romanticized as a people with magical power who live in harmony with the spiritual and physical worlds.

While Elsa attempts to find out who was calling her, Anna destroys the dam to make amends to the Northuldra for Arendelle's mistakes. Elsa's last-minute intervention prevents the destruction of the kingdom, but Anna destroys the dam in the belief that Elsa is dead. According to Kang, the film promotes reparations for past atrocities. Matt Goldberg wrote that the symbolism of the film's ending is undercut by having Elsa save Arendelle, instead of rebuilding the kingdom elsewhere.

Racial issues in Frozen 2 are mitigated by making Elsa and Anna half Northuldran, and their mother is depicted as a heroine who saved their father (King Agnarr) from death during the battle.

Jennifer Baldwin described Frozen 2 as a film about trauma, transformation, and faith communities' more-active role in environmental repair. Environmental trauma is caused by the dam, which weakens the elemental spirits. Olaf describes the forest as a place of transformation, including venturing into the unknown, befriending the spirits and the indigenous Northuldra, and confronting trauma. Elsa gains the trust of the spirits, each leading her closer to the truth and her transformation into one of the elements. Anna employs the giants (symbolic of the earth) to break the dam (symbolic of trauma and mistrust) and gains her own strength, independent of her relationship with Elsa. According to Baldwin, this encourages the audience to adopt more sustainable practices, make amends, and work together to preserve the natural world. The film can introduce young children to environmental issues, such as climate change.

Sociologist Lauren Dundes describes Elsa's relationship with the mythological horse Nøkk and concludes that "her skills as a horse whisperer do not threaten men's ascendancy [...] These themes show how Disney balked at modernizing Elsa, retreating to outdated conceptions of gender roles". Nia Kurniawati wrote that Frozen 2's feminist message was subtle and realistic.

== Marketing and release ==
Prior to the film's first trailer, a Frozen 2 DVD appears in the 2016 film Zootopia, alongside Moana and the unproduced film Gigantic. Disney released the first trailer for Frozen 2 on February 13, 2019. Viewed 116.4 million times in its first 24 hours, it was the most-watched animated film trailer until the teaser of Inside Out 2 (2024) surpassed that record in November 2023. At the release of the preview poster, American astrophysicist Neil deGrasse Tyson commented that "water crystals have hexagonal 'six-fold' symmetry" (shown correctly in Frozen) but the poster had a four-sided snowflake. Lee replied that it was not really a snowflake; the four sides represented the four elemental spirits and its center represented Elsa, the fifth spirit. Disney partnered with 140 other brands worldwide to promote Frozen 2, the highest number of brands for a Disney animated film. They marketed Frozen 2 in the U.S. through internal and external partners, including Enterprise Rent-A-Car, McDonald's, and Lego. To support the film's marketing campaign, the lead voice cast made several public and televised appearances; these included a Friendsgiving stunt night on ABC, introductions on The Masked Singer, and a Women of Impact program on Nat Geo Wild. In November 2019, the lead voice cast's schedules were so full that Bell said: "Time [was] not there".

The 103-minute film Frozen 2 premiered on November 7, 2019, at the Dolby Theatre in Hollywood, Los Angeles. It was initially scheduled for release on November 27, but was moved forward five days, to November 22, 2019. On January 17, 2020, a sing-along version of Frozen 2 was released. It was localized by Disney Character Voices International into 45 languages by its original theatrical release date; Frozen had been translated into 41 languages. The success of Frozen's localized versions led to the release of an album with all versions of "Let It Go", and Jikŋon 2 (a Northern Sami version) was released to honor the people's contributions.

Walt Disney Studios Home Entertainment released Frozen 2 for digital download on February 11, 2020, and on Blu-ray and DVD on February 25. At the same time, a 4K Ultra HD Blu-ray, Ultimate Collector's Edition, and 4KUHD Blu-ray SteelBook edition was released. Special features include a sing-along audio recording of the film, a presentation of the Nordic mythology on which the Enchanted Forest is based, musical clips, and 29 translated versions of "Into the Unknown", as well as deleted music and scenes. The film, initially scheduled to premiere on Disney+ on June 26, 2020, was moved up to March 15 in the United States and March 17 in Canada, the Netherlands, Australia, and New Zealand due to the COVID-19 pandemic.

=== Documentary series ===
Megan Harding (who had directed a 2014 making-of ABC television special about Frozen) reached out to Disney Animation about documenting the production of Frozen 2; with the company's cooperation, Harding, working with Lincoln Square Productions, commuted from New York City to Burbank, California and shot 1,300 hours of footage in 115 days between December 2018 and the November 2019 world premiere. She edited the footage down to six episodes, about 35 to 45 minutes long. Disney Animation knew that Harding intended to take a "fearless" and "honest look" at the filmmaking process; her crew was asked to leave only once, when the production team wanted to decide the mysterious voice's identity. The documentary series, Into the Unknown: Making Frozen 2, was released on June 26, 2020.

== Reception ==
=== Box office ===
Frozen 2 grossed $477.4 million in the United States and Canada and $976.3 million in other territories, for a worldwide total of $1.453 billion. It was the third-highest-grossing film of 2019, the tenth-highest-grossing film of all time, and the second-highest-grossing animated film of all time. On December 15, 2019, Frozen 2 passed the $1 billion mark at the global box office. Deadline Hollywood calculated the film's net profit as $599 million, accounting for production budgets, marketing, talent participations, and other costs; box office grosses and home media revenues placed it second on their list of 2019's "Most Valuable Blockbusters". According to Disney (who did not consіder the 2019 Lion King remake an anіmated fіlm but a live-action reboot), Frozen 2 was the hіghest-grossing anіmated fіlm (surpassing Frozen) at that time. Frozen 2's box-office success was attributed to its release date near Thanksgiving. According to Comscore analyst Paul Dergarabedian, the film was "perfectly positioned to play well into 2020."

Frozen 2 was released with A Beautiful Day in the Neighborhood and 21 Bridges on November 22, 2019, in 4,440 theaters: 2,500 in 3D, 800 in the premium large format (including 400 in IMAX), and 235 in D-Box/4DX. It grossed $41.8 million on its first day, including $8.5 million from Thursday night previews. The film debuted grossing $130 million, the highest opening for an animated film that month. Frozen 2 primarily drew a mostly female audience and approximately 70 percent of the viewers were families. Its second weekend grosses dropped by 34 percent to $85.6 million (with $125 million over the five-day Thanksgiving weekend) and followed by another $34.7 million the third weekend. By December 29, the film's domestic grosses topped $400 million. Frozen 2 left theaters by March 19, 2020, making it the fourth highest-grossing film of 2019 in the United States and Canada, at which point the film industry became significantly affected by the COVID-19 pandemic.

Worldwide, Frozen 2 grossed $228.2 million in its opening weekend in 37 markets, for a global debut total of $358.5 million. This surpassed the 2019 remake of The Lion King to become the highest-grossing film for an animated title until The Super Mario Bros. Movie (2023) took over. It had the best all-time opening of an animated film in the United Kingdom ($17.8 million) and France ($13.4 million); the biggest start for a Pixar or Disney Animation title in China ($53 million), Japan ($18.2 million), Germany ($14.9 million) and Spain ($5.8 million), and the third-biggest opening of any film in South Korea ($31.5 million). The film grossed $11.4 million in its second week in the United Kingdom, bringing its total gross there to $35.3 million. By January 5, 2020, the film's offshore gross had exceeded $875.3 million. As of July 2021, its top international markets were Japan ($122.6 million), China ($122.3 million), South Korea ($95.5 million), the United Kingdom ($69.7 million), Germany ($60.6 million), and France ($53.9 million).

=== Critical response ===
Frozen 2 received generally positive reviews. It has an approval rating of 77% based on 336 professional reviews on the review aggregator website Rotten Tomatoes, with an average rating of 6.7/10. The site's critical consensus reads, "Frozen II can't quite recapture the showstopping feel of its predecessor, but it remains a dazzling adventure into the unknown." Metacritic (which uses a weighted average) assigned Frozen 2 a score of 64 out of 100 score based on 47 critics, indicating "generally favorable" reviews. Audiences polled by CinemaScore gave the film an average grade of A− (lower than Frozen's A+) on an A+ to F scale, and PostTrak rated it 4.5 out of five stars on the film's opening day.

Frozen II continues in the same nonthreatening, emancipatory vein, jumping to life when Elsa responds to the siren's call. As before, the songs by Kristen Anderson-Lopez and Robert Lopez are pleasantly melodious with lyrics that can have the quality of a confession, as if a friend were sharing her inner-voice struggles.

— Manohla Dargis, The New York Times

Critics praised Frozen 2's craftsmanship, delivery, and themes. (Note: Attributed to multiple references:) The New York Times critic Manohla Dargis called the narrative a "pink world of adventure and aspirational uplift", and Nell Minow of RogerEbert.com noted its frank, compelling depiction of issues which were understandable by audiences of all ages. Dargis cited Frozen 2's engaging visual imagery, balanced by romance and history, and Minow noted the film's autumnal palette. Peter Travers (Rolling Stone), Simran Hans (The Guardian), and Todd McCarthy (The Hollywood Reporter) praised the film. Travers, who enjoyed reconnecting with the characters, called the animation stunning and referred to the music as "tantalizing earworms". Hans compared the film's narrative to real-world efforts to mitigate climate change. McCarthy praised its "catchy songs", "easy-to-like characters", and "astonishing backdrops", with humor and a plot driven by "female empowerment galore".

Frozen 2's narrative, music, and focus were criticized. (Note: Attributed to multiple references:) In The Wall Street Journal, John Anderson noted that the sequel was not innovative and criticized the film's flawed narrative and low-quality music in comparison with Frozen. In an Empire review, Ben Travis said that the narrative relied too much on mythology and hazy backstories. Minow criticized the film's excessively detailed narrative, and Observer writer Oliver Jones said that the film's energy and originality were overly focused on the sisters. Reviewers for the Los Angeles Times and The Washington Post cited Frozen 2's complicated story and dark tone.

=== Accolades ===
At the 92nd Academy Awards, Frozen 2 received a nomination for Best Original Song. The film's other nominations include eight Annie Awards (winning two), a British Academy Film Award, two Critics' Choice Movie Awards, and two Golden Globe Awards.

== Sequels ==
A sequel, Frozen 3, is set for release on November 24, 2027, while a fourth film is in development.
