= MTV Fandom Awards =

American fan voted awards (2014–2016)

- Awarded for: Best film and television works of previous year
- Country: United States
- First award: 2014
- Final award: 2016
- Website: www.mtv.com/fandom (defunct)

Television/radio coverage
- Network: MTV

The MTV Fandom Awards was an annual pop culture, television and film awards show presented by MTV with awards voted on by fans.

== Ceremonies ==
Edition	Date aired	Host(s)	Performers
1st	July 27, 2014	Tyler Oakley	Linkin Park; G-Eazy
2nd	July 12, 2015	Tyler Posey and Bella Thorne	All Time Low; Flo Rida
3rd	July 24, 2016	Tyler Posey	Kent Jones; Krewella

== Categories ==
- Best New Fandom of the Year
- Fandom of the Year
- Feels Freak Out of the Year
- Ship of the Year
- Fandom Army of the Year
- Animation Fandom of the Year
- Social Superstar of the Year
- Best Fandom Forever
- Best Revival Fandom
