= Jeff Draheim =

American film editor

Jeff Draheim ACE
- Born: Jeff Jerry Draheim; 1963 (age 62–63); Omaha, Nebraska, United States
- Education: Millard High School; University of Nebraska–Lincoln; University of Southern California
- Known for: Film editing
- Notable work: The Princess and the Frog; Frozen; Moana; Frozen 2 Wish
- Spouse: Adrienne Biggs
- Awards: Eddie Award

Jeff Jerry Draheim (born 1963) is an American film editor. He mostly works in the Hollywood industry, especially in animation. He debuted with the video game Disney's Animated Storybook: Hercules (1997). His film credits include The Princess and the Frog, Frozen, Moana, Frozen 2, and Wish. He has won one Eddie Award and has been nominated for two Eddie and Annie Awards.

== Early life ==
Jeff Draheim was born in 1963 to Jan and Jerry Draheim, who lived in Omaha at that time. He graduated from Millard High School in 1981. He studied film and broadcast journalism at the University of Nebraska–Lincoln and University of Southern California.

== Career ==
Upon graduation he worked at Morin Advertising and KPTM television at Omaha and did video post-production at Avid, Inc. in Orlando. He joined Walt Disney Animation Studios in 1994 and worked as a lead editor for Florida division, creating animation for commercials, documentaries and theme park presentations. From there he gradually worked his way up to animated shorts and then features, working on movies like Brother Bear, The Princess and the Frog and the Academy Award winning 2014 short Feast. Later he worked on Frozen, Moana, Frozen 2, and Wish.

== Personal life ==
He lives in Valencia, California with his wife Adrienne and their two children.

== Filmography ==
=== Editor ===
Year	Work	Notes	Reference
1997	Disney's Animated Storybook: Hercules	(Video Game)	
2007	How to Hook Up Your Home Theater	(Short)	
2009	The Princess and the Frog		
2010	Prep & Landing Stocking Stuffer: Operation: Secret Santa	(TV Short)	
2011	The Ballad of Nessie	(Short)	
2011	Prep & Landing: Naughty vs. Nice	(TV Short)	
2013	Frozen		
2014	Feast	(Short)	
2015	Frozen Fever	(Short)	
2016	Moana		
2019	Frozen 2		
2023	Wish		

=== Editorial department ===
Year	Work	Job	Notes	Reference
1996	Pinocchio	(editor: animation)	(Video Game)	
1996	Pocahontas	(editor: animation)	(Video Game)	
2000	John Henry	(supervising editor)	(Short)	
2003	Brother Bear	(associate editor)		
2005	Kronk's New Groove	(lead editor)	(Video)	
2006	Brother Bear 2	(supervising editor)	(Video)	
2008	The Little Mermaid: Ariel's Beginning	(additional editor)	(Video)	
2014	Legends of Oz: Dorothy's Return	(associate editor)		
2016	Zootopia	(additional editorial support)		

=== Miscellaneous crew ===
Year	Work	Job	Notes	Reference
2014	Big Hero 6	(departmental leadership: Walt Disney Animation Studios)		

== Accolades ==
Year	Award	Category	Work	Result	Reference
2014	Eddie Award	Best Edited Animated Feature Film	Frozen	Won	
2014	Annie Award	Outstanding Achievement in Editorial in an Animated Feature Production	Frozen	Nominated	
2017	Eddie Award	Best Edited Animated Feature Film	Moana	Nominated	
2017	Annie Award	Outstanding Achievement in Editorial in an Animated Feature Production	Moana	Nominated	
2020	Eddie Award	Best Edited Animated Feature Film	Frozen 2	Nominated	
