= 2014 MTV Fandom Awards =

- Date: July 24, 2014
- Location: San Diego Comic-Con
- Hosted by: Tyler Oakley
- Website: http://www.mtv.com/fandom-awards/2014

Television/radio coverage
- Network: MTV

The 2014 MTV Fandom Awards, honoring fan favorite movies and television shows for 2014, was held on July 24, 2014 and broadcast on July 27 on MTV.

== Performances ==
- Linkin Park
- G-Eazy

== Presenters ==
- Jenna Dewan-Tatum — presented Visionary Award
- Diego Luna
- Kellan Lutz
- Chloë Grace Moretz
- Tyler Posey
- Retta
- Channing Tatum
- Steven Yeun

== Winners and nominees ==
The full list of nominees was announced on June 19, 2014. Winners are listed first and in boldface.

Breakout Fandom of the Year	Ship of the Year
**Hannibal**; Orphan Black; Sleepy Hollow; Frozen; Bates Motel	**Damon/Elena "Delena" (The Vampire Diaries)**; Stiles/Derek "Sterek" (Teen Wolf); Dean/Castiel "Destiel" (Supernatural); Sherlock/John Watson "Johnlock" (Sherlock); Katniss Everdeen/Peeta Mellark "Everlark" (The Hunger Games)
Fandom Feat of the Year	OMG Moment of the Year
**Teen Wolf** (fans raised more than $25,000 to build a wolf sanctuary); Veronica Mars (fans were successful in funding a Kickstarter campaign to create the Veronica Mars film); Community (the fandom kept the show on the air by petitioning for more episodes, while also getting back original writer Dan Harmon); Hannibal (fans used their power to get the show renewed for a second season); Supernatural (Misha Collins and the fans of the series created "Random Acts", raising money for charitable organizations)	**Game of Thrones – The Purple Wedding**; Star Wars – new cast photo; Breaking Bad – series finale; How I Met Your Mother – series finale; Batfleck – Ben Affleck cast in Batman v. Superman
Best Fandom Forever	Fandom of the Year
**Harry Potter**; The Lord of the Rings; Buffy the Vampire Slayer; Doctor Who; Sherlock; Batman	**Veronica Mars**

=== Visionary Award ===
John Green
