= I Will Survive (comic) =

2017 fan fiction comic about abortion

- The first page of the comic, in which Judy Hopps discovers her pregnancy

Publication information
- Publisher: DeviantArt
- Format: Limited series
- Genre: Zootopia fan fiction
- Publication date: March – June 2017
- No. of issues: 25
- Main character(s): Judy Hopps; Nick Wilde

Creative team
- Written by: William Borba
- Artist: William Borba

I Will Survive (colloquially known as the "Zootopia abortion comic") is a 2017 fan fiction comic by William Borba, featuring the characters Judy Hopps and Nick Wilde from the 2016 animated film Zootopia. It quickly spread as an internet meme due to its anti-abortion subject matter, and involves Judy discovering that she is pregnant by Nick and pursuing an abortion, leading to an argument between them and the breakdown of their relationship.

== Plot ==
Judy Hopps discovers that she is pregnant and informs her boyfriend Nick Wilde. He is overjoyed at the prospect of becoming a father, but Judy confesses that she does not want to keep the child. Judy states that she did not use contraception during sex as she assumed that, as different species, they would not be able to conceive offspring; she expresses fear that their child will be a "freak" and concern over her own health, along with the pregnancy potentially jeopardizing her job at the ZPD. When Nick accuses Judy of killing their child to advance her career, she slaps him across the face before apologizing. Nick silently packs a bag while Judy pleads with him not to leave her. Nick reminds Judy that he loves her because of the good things she has done and says that her abortion would rob their child of a chance to do the same. Judy refuses, insisting on bodily autonomy.

When asked why she did not simply keep her pregnancy secret, Judy says he deserved to know. Nick ends their relationship and leaves, assuring her that he will be fine. Alone in her apartment, Judy collapses to the floor in tears.

== Publication history ==
Prior to the comic's publication, the film Zootopia was already popular among the furry fandom due to rumors that The Walt Disney Company had directly asked members of its community to promote the film.

The art and story were put together by artist William Borba. The art for Nick and Judy's apartment was visually similar to Jerry Seinfeld's apartment in the series Seinfeld. According to Borba, he did not intend for the comic to align with either pro-life or pro-choice arguments, but rather simply to highlight the arguments of both sides and show that "even an apparently eternal love can fall apart" when a couple is unable to reconcile their differences.

The comic was first published in March 2017 on DeviantArt by Borba. In June 2017, I Will Survive was published on the website Zootopia News Network, which acknowledged that the comic was highly controversial.

== Reception ==
The comic was met with controversy, with one website calling it "the most controversial comic the fandom had ever seen". This controversy however largely stayed within Zootopia's already-extant fanbase until December 2017, when images from the comic were posted on Twitter by Eric Munn. After that, the comic quickly went viral for it being interpreted as conveying anti-abortion sentiment as Nick refers to the act as "premeditated sin". Internet memes spread about the comic, including people editing the text bubble so that the characters were arguing about other topics, including air conditioning and Arby's. By October 2023, the comic remained a common cultural reference that people could identify from couple costumes.

In analyzing the comic's popularity, Jay Hathaway of The Daily Dot described it as unintentionally humorous due to combining "a straight-faced diatribe on a serious subject" with Disney characters. He praised Borba's art as "stunning and well worth saving" while noting that the direction the characters go is "laughable". Overall, he said that the comic was worth rereading and finding new elements to laugh at each time.

While the response to the comic was largely criticizing its supposed anti-abortion stance, a number of articles were written, including by The A.V. Club, which were specifically directed against the furry community, as noted by The Mary Sue's Ollie Kaplan.

== Sequels ==
Two sequels to I Will Survive were later released. In Born to Be Alive (2018), Nick attempts to reconcile with Judy one year after the abortion, only to learn that Judy has fallen in love with a vixen named Shay. In Never Say Goodbye (2021), Nick and Judy meet again 10 years after the events of Zootopia, each married with children. Nick is the scoutmaster of the local junior rangers, and Judy has become the mayor of Zootopia during a period of political tension driven by "pro-pred" and "pro-prey" extremists. They are glad to see each other, and their friendship resumes. Later, while Judy rides in a motorcade with her wife, two assassins from opposite ends of the political spectrum shoot Judy in the head, though the bullets turn out to be only made of red jelly.
