= Zootopia: Better Zoogether! =

3D show attraction at Disney's Animal Kingdom

Disney's Animal Kingdom
- Area: Discovery Island
- Coordinates: 28.35787°N 81.59060°W
- Status: Operating
- Opening date: November 7, 2025
- Replaced: It's Tough to Be a Bug!

Ride statistics
- Attraction type: 3D film
- Designer: Walt Disney Imagineering
- Model: Theater
- Theme: Zootopia
- Music: "We Are Zoonited" by Michael Giacchino (music), Kate Anderson (lyrics) and Elyssa Samsel (lyrics); Score by Michael Giacchino (score)
- Audience capacity: 428 per show
- Duration: 10 minutes
- Show host: Benjamin Clawhauser
- Wheelchair accessible

Zootopia: Better Zoogether! is a 3D film based on Disney's 2016 film Zootopia. The attraction first opened with Disney's Animal Kingdom at Walt Disney World on November 7, 2025, nineteen days before Zootopia 2 debuted in theaters, and is housed within the theme park's icon, the Tree of Life. The attraction is hosted by Benjamin Clawhauser, a cheetah and police dispatcher from Zootopia, who assists partners Judy Hopps and Nick Wilde investigate the sabotaged Zoogether Day celebrations. The attraction features both original and returning characters from the original film, sequel, and streaming anthology series, Zootopia+. The film utilizes theater lighting, 3D filming techniques, Audio-Animatronics and various special effects. The attraction replaced It's Tough to Be a Bug!, a similarly formatted 3D film based on the Pixar film A Bug's Life.

== History ==
=== Production ===
On September 9, 2023, it was announced on the Destination D23 that a Zootopia-themed 3D show will replace the long-running 3D show, "It's Tough to Be a Bug!" at Disney's Animal Kingdom. Following the closure of "It's Tough to Be a Bug!", construction of the Zootopia-themed attraction began on June 23, 2025, with the signage from the former show being removed.[2]

On August 21, 2025, it was announced that the attraction would open on November 7 of 2025, nineteen days before the theatrical release of Zootopia 2. Additional details revealed that the attraction would showcase characters from the sequel, along with new original characters, such as Heidi Howler, a wolf serving as the hostess of the attraction, ice-skaters from Tundratown representing polar bears and reindeer, synchronized marine mammal swimmers called the "Marshmaids" from Marsh Market, and the Shrew Angels from Little Rodentia performing a drone show. It was also confirmed that Ginnifer Goodwin and Jason Bateman would reprise their roles as Judy and Nick, respectively, with the team from Walt Disney Animation Studios contributing to the attraction.[3]

On July 29, 2026, it was announced that Mayor Winddancer would be added in a new pre-show before the attraction begins. [4]

=== Film ===
The show, centered around the film, featured Judy Hopps, Nick Wilde, Gazelle, Chief Bogo, Yax, Finnick, Fru Fru, Flash Slothmore, Priscilla Tripletoe, Duke Weaselton and the Lemmings. The show additionally included an animatronic Clawhauser according to concept art similar to the one from Zootopia: Hot Pursuit featured in the Zootopia area at Shanghai Disneyland as part of the park's expansion.

== Summary ==
=== Queue ===
At Disney's Animal Kingdom, the Tree of Life Theater was located within the park's icon, the Tree of Life. Many animals are carved throughout the exterior queue between the roots of the trees, which are not visible from other vantage points. Posters of various acts featured in the show were displayed including the "Tundratown Ice Ballet", the "Shrew Angels", "Marshmaids" and a poster featuring Gazelle herself. Additionally included are a map of Zootopia, a "Pawdora" display featuring various jewelry referencing Pandora.

=== Attraction ===
A wolf named Heidi Howler hosts a live Zoogether Day watch party show, announcing upcoming live performances across Zootopia and an unforgettable concert finale from pop star Gazelle. She wishes the audience a happy Zoogether Day with a howl and explains that today, they will be celebrating our communal existence, shared environment and the sacred responsibility... to party. She fires a t-shirt cannon into the crowd (which triggers hidden air cannons in the back of the seats) and announces that someone from the audience will kick off the show as the Zoogether Day VIZ (acronym for Very Important Zootopian). The screen displays jumbotron footage of the chosen VIZ, Flash Slothmore, but Benjamin Clawhauser appears too and thinks the honor is going to himself. Heidi tries to tell him that he is not the VIZ, but goes along with it and lets him come on up. She tells him he has the best seat in the house and instructs him to press the big red button next to him. Clawhauser presses all the wrong buttons, which activate a disco ball and disrupt the cameras, before pressing the right one. Confetti cannons go off and one of them blasts Heidi, sending her flying off the stage. Clawhauser asks her if she is okay and Sam, the stage manager, tells Clawhauser he needs to fill in for her.

Clawhauser reads the prompter and announces an ice dance performance in Tundratown, switching to the camera feed there after a few failed attempts. He encourages the audience to welcome the cold weather correspondent "Cashlov", to which Koslov corrects him on the pronunciation of his name. Koslov says that predator and prey, as well as ice dancing, are balances of nature, and that together they are strong, like his mother. Some performers dressed as snowflakes use flamethrowers around Koslov, and the ice below him melts, causing him to fall into the water. The performers slip on the ice as Judy Hopps and Nick Wilde arrive in a snowmobile. Judy proposes that the disaster is the result of criminal sabotage and wonders who would do this. She realizes the other celebrations could be in danger as well and asks Clawhauser where the next event is. He tells her it is at Marsh Market, where she and Nick hurry to.

The camera feed shifts to Marsh Market, where a celebration for life-giving waters called "Wetter Together" is a flop, as all the water in the neighborhood has been dried up while sea lions dressed as mermaids dove into the mud. Judy and Nick arrive, and Judy wonders why someone would sabotage Zoogether Day. Nick goes to check the pipes and tells Judy to interview the witnesses before he falls into one of the pipes. Nibbles Maplestick pops out of a bucket of fish and offers to help and Judy tells her that they need to know if anyone saw anything. Nibbles rings a bell and Russ rises out of a pipe. After she and Russ exchange several "hey bubs (with variations in between)" and raspberries (which triggers hidden water sprayers in the back of the seats), she asks him if he saw who did this and he simply replies, "nope" before taking a fish from the bucket and sinking back down into the pipe. Nick is propelled through a tube system and falls out of another pipe which then fills up the marsh with water again, which Judy notices is clogged with wool. Clawhauser tells them their next stop is Little Rodentia.

The camera feed now shows Fru Fru and Mr. Big in Fru Fru's mansion. Fru Fru introduces the Shrew Angels, who perform an air show by piloting drones. The drones then start flying out of control as Fru Fru and Mr. Big declare that while the residents of Little Rodentia are small, every creature can make a big difference no matter their size. One of the drones picks up Fru Fru, flying her around the town. The pilot abandons the drone as panic ensues and all the rodents run around and scream in panic, leading the theater seats to bounce above guests' seats. Fortunately, Judy and Nick manage to save her by catching her in The Big Donut's sign. Nick then notices a pair of rams, who were using static electricity from their wool and balloons to disrupt the drones. Judy and Nick pursue them to the last celebration site, Gazelle's concert in Sahara Square.

Gazelle arrives on stage via a helicopter and Clawhauser spots Chief Bogo dancing. Clawhauser calls him out for telling him he was going to a security conference and Bogo gives the excuse that he is undercover. Judy, Nick and the rams run by him and past the crowd into a tent occupied by Yax, when Gazelle's biggest fan - a literal fan - generates a tornado and traps them in it. Judy temporarily stops the fan as she then finds out who the culprit is, but eventually the fan soon comes crashing down on them. They are saved by Gazelle at the last second before the camera feed goes out and the connection is lost but not before Judy warns Clawhauser to beware of Heidi.

Heidi comes back and Clawhauser tells her that Zoogether Day is ruined, much to the former's excitement as she strangely laughs evilly. Judy arrives and kicks off Heidi's head, which turns out to be a mask, revealing that she is Dawn Bellwether in disguise. As she chastises her enemies and mocks Zoogether Day, Bellwether is soon blasted away by a confetti cannon again, in which her animatronic rear can be seen. Judy declares the case closed, but Clawhauser is disappointed that they never got their big finale. Gazelle descends from the ceiling to kick off the finale and everyone sings "We Are Zoonited", singing about how everyone in Zootopia and in the animal kingdom are "zoonited" and we see Flash one more time and the show ends.

== Voice cast ==
- Ginnifer Goodwin as Judy Hopps
- Jason Bateman as Nick Wilde
- Nate Torrence as Clawhauser
- Jenny Slate as Dawn Bellwether / Heidi Howler
- Leah Latham as Fru Fru
- Maurice LaMarche as Mr. Big
- Idris Elba as Chief Bogo
- Shakira as Gazelle
- Tommy Chong as Yax
- Raymond S. Persi as Flash
- Fortune Feimster as Nibbles Maplestick
- David VanTuyle as Russ
- Charlotte Nicdao as Sam
- Kevin Michael Richardson as Finnick
- Brian Hull as Koslov
- Patrick Warburton as Mayor Winddancer

== See also ==
- The Tree of Life
- Muppet*Vision 3D
- Mickey's PhilharMagic
- List of Disney's Animal Kingdom attractions
