= Zootopia (franchise) =

Disney media franchise

- Created by: Byron Howard; Rich Moore; Jared Bush; Phil Johnston; Jim Reardon; Josie Trinidad; Jennifer Lee
- Original work: Zootopia (2016)
- Owner: The Walt Disney Company
- Years: 2016–present

Films and television
- Films: Zootopia (2016); Zootopia 2 (2025); Zootopia 3 (TBA)
- Short film: A Day in the Life of Zootopia (2025)
- Animated series: Zootopia+ (2022)

Games
- Video games: Disney Infinity 3.0^{*}; Zootopia: Crime Files; Disney Magic Kingdoms^{*}; Zootopia: Racing Carnival

Audio
- Soundtracks: Zootopia (2016); Zootopia 2 (2025)

Miscellaneous
- Theme park attractions: Zootopia: Hot Pursuit (2023–present); Zootopia: Better Zoogether! (2025–present)

Official website
- disney.com/Zootopia/
- ^{*} Work where this franchise's characters and/or settings appeared as part of a crossover.

Zootopia, also known as Zootropolis or Zoomania in various regions, (Note: Due to trademark issues, the film is titled Zootropolis in various regions such as the UK, Ireland, Italy and Spain, and Zoomania in Germany.) is a Disney media franchise that began in 2016 with the release of the American animated feature film Zootopia, produced by Walt Disney Animation Studios and released by Walt Disney Pictures.

The franchise takes place in the titular city where anthropomorphic animals consisting of predators and prey coexist with one another, with a particular focus on the adventures of Judy Hopps, a rabbit police officer in the Zootopia Police Department (ZPD) and Nick Wilde, a cynical fox hustler who becomes a police officer at the department himself.

The franchise consists of two animated films, Zootopia (2016) and Zootopia 2 (2025), and one television series, Zootopia+ (2022), which aired on Disney+, with a third animated film currently in development. Both films have been critically and commercially successful, with the latter film being the highest grossing animated film from Walt Disney Animation Studios and the second highest grossing animated film of all time. It has since become one of the highest grossing media franchises of all time.

== Films ==
Film	Release date	Director(s)	Screenwriter(s)	Story by	Producer(s)
Zootopia	March 4, 2016	Byron Howard & Rich Moore	Jared Bush & Phil Johnston	Jared Bush, Byron Howard, Phil Johnston, Jennifer Lee, Rich Moore, Jim Reardon & Josie Trinidad	Clark Spencer
Zootopia 2	November 26, 2025	Jared Bush & Byron Howard	Jared Bush	Jared Bush	Yvett Merino
Zootopia 3	TBA	TBA	TBA	TBA	TBA

=== Zootopia (2016) ===
Development of the film that would come to be called Zootopia began when Byron Howard pitched six-story ideas to Disney Animation chief creative officer and executive producer John Lasseter, of which three involved animal characters: an all-animal adaptation of The Three Musketeers, a 1960s-themed story about a "mad doctor cat...who turned children into animals", and a "bounty hunter pug in space". The common thread running through these ideas was that Howard wanted to do a film similar to Disney's Robin Hood, which also featured animals in anthropomorphic roles. According to Howard, Zootopia was inspired by his own childhood taking trips to many countries and cities globally, Zootopia emerged from his desire to create something different from other animal anthropomorphic films, where animals either live in the natural world or in the human world. His concept, in which animals live in a modern world designed by animals for animals, was well received by Lasseter, who responded by embracing and lifting Howard "in the air like a baby Simba". Lasseter suggested that Howard should try combining the 1960s theme with the animal characters, especially the space pug. This led Howard to develop and pitch Savage Seas, an international spy film centered on an arctic hare named "Jack Savage" who was somewhat like James Bond. It was around this time that screenwriter Jared Bush was hired to work on the film; he was excited to work on a spy film because his own father and grandfather had worked for the Central Intelligence Agency. Howard, Moore, and Bush have repetitively told the influences like Robin Hood and The Jungle Book.

Howard and Bush continued to develop the film with the assistance of the Disney Story Trust, the studio's top creative personnel who meet regularly to review and discuss all projects in development. The most delightful part of the spy film turned out to be its first act, set in a city created by and for animals. To focus on the all-animal city, Howard eventually dropped the 1960s setting, along with the espionage and international aspects, and changed the film into a contemporary police procedural in which Nick Wilde was the lead role and Judy Hopps was essentially his sidekick. For a while, "the filmmakers were very committed" to that version of the story, but then in November 2014, the filmmakers realized the film's plot would be more engaging if they reversed the roles to instead focus on Judy as opposed to Nick. The change in perspective involved dropping several characters, including two characters known as "The Gerbil Jerks" who were described as "trust-fund gerbils that had nothing better to do than harass Nick."

In May 2013, The Hollywood Reporter initially reported that Howard was directing the film and that Jason Bateman had been cast, but little else about the film was known at the time. Zootopia was first officially announced on August 10, 2013, at the D23 Expo, with a March 2016 release date.

Research for the film took place in Disney's Animal Kingdom, as well as in Kenya and the San Diego Zoo Safari Park, where animators spent eight months studying various animals' walk cycles as well as fur color. Eight hundred thousand forms of mammals were created for and featured in the film. To make the characters' fur even more realistic, they also went to the Natural History Museum of Los Angeles County to closely observe the appearance of fur with a microscope under a variety of lighting. The filmmakers drew inspiration for Zootopia's urban design from major cities including New York City, San Francisco, Las Vegas, Paris, Shanghai, Hong Kong, and Brasília. To develop a city that could actually be inhabited by talking mammals ranging in size from two inches (5.1 cm) to 27 feet (8.2 m) and from drastically different climates, the filmmakers consulted Americans with Disabilities Act specialists and HVAC system designers. For assistance with designing motor vehicles appropriate for so many different types and sizes of mammals, the filmmakers consulted with J Mays, former chief creative officer of the Ford Motor Company. During the development process, Walt Disney Studios chairman Alan F. Horn suggested that Nick should expressly state his disappointment ("Just when I thought someone actually believed in me...") after discovering that Judy still fears him as a predator. In March 2015, it was revealed that Rich Moore (Wreck-It Ralph) had been added as a director of the film, in addition to Jared Bush (Penn Zero: Part-Time Hero) as co-director.

=== Zootopia 2 (2025) ===
In June 2016, Howard and Moore were in talks about the possibility of a Zootopia sequel. On February 8, 2023, Disney CEO Bob Iger announced that a sequel to Zootopia was in the works. Later that day, screenwriter Jared Bush confirmed that he was working on the film, while Josie Trinidad was confirmed as the film's co-director. Ginnifer Goodwin told CinemaBlend that she'd like to see a role reversal between Judy and Nick in the sequel, stating that she "would like to see Nick have to be the one to convince Judy that the world is worth fighting for." Jason Bateman also told CinemaBlend about his idea for the sequel: "The two of us [Nick and Judy] kicking butt out there. Cleaning up the streets. We're a couple of new cops out there. So, bad guys, be warned."

On February 7, 2024, Iger announced that the film would be officially titled Zootopia 2 and would be released on November 26, 2025. On April 15, 2024, Goodwin confirmed on her Instagram account that she began recording her lines for Judy, revealing that the film is in production. In August 2024, Bush was revealed to be the writer and only director of the sequel, and Yvett Merino was revealed to be the producer. Disney Chief Creative Officer Jennifer Lee executive produces the film. On August 9, 2024, it was announced that Zootopia 2 would feature reptiles, and Ke Huy Quan was announced to be playing Gary, a snake being pursued by Nick and Judy. Footage was also shown of a sequence in which Nick and Judy search for Gary in Marsh Market. The following day, Bush revealed on his X account that Fortune Feimster joined the cast to voice a character named Nibbles.

=== Zootopia 3 ===
Talks of a third Zootopia film began before Zootopia 2 released in theaters, with both directors and actors openly discussing different possibilities. With Zootopia 2 making $1 billion in record time, the inclusion of the post-credits scene hinting at a story focused on birds and an easter egg in the film stating "Part 3 is for real and birds are too" in Paul's password, it was believed that a sequel would be approved very soon. On December 21, 2025, directors Byron Howard and Jared Bush confirmed that they had already started planning a third film. On August 15, 2026, Zootopia 3 was officially revealed to be in development at D23.

== Streaming series ==
=== Zootopia+ (2022) ===
The anthology series of short films features six stories that take place during the events of the original film. On December 10, 2020, Walt Disney Animation Studios chief creative officer Jennifer Lee announced that a spin-off series titled Zootopia+ and based on the 2016 film Zootopia is in development at the studio for Disney+. Trent Correy and Josie Trinidad, who worked as an animator and head of story for the film, respectively, were set to direct the series. The idea for the series was suggested by Correy during a pitch presentation in 2020, as one of three pitches for potential Disney+ series; he developed a pitch for a Zootopia series due to his interest in wanting to further explore the film's world and characters. Trinidad was originally set to direct only two episodes for the series, but her excitement to work on the project caused her to be ascended to co-director for the entire series alongside Cortney. The series was produced remotely due to the COVID-19 pandemic, which complicated the production process according to producer Nathan Curtis. Correy's pitch featured 10 stories, but four of them had to be discarded due to receiving a 6-episode order. Lee executive-produces the series alongside Zootopia and Encanto co-directors Byron Howard and Jared Bush.

=== A Day in the Life of Zootopia (2025) ===
A Day in the Life of Zootopia is a mini series of four animated shorts produced by Shanghai Animation Film Studio in collaboration with Disney.

== Setting ==
The Zootopia franchise takes place in a world inhabited by anthropomorphic animals.

=== Zootopia ===
Zootopia is a modern city and the main setting of the franchise. There are 12 unique artificially maintained ecosystems within the city limits with a massive climate control system called "Weather Walls" (invented by Agnes De'Snake, Gary's great-grandmother) between its different districts which include:

- Tundratown - A district that is kept in a permanent cold arctic environment.
- Sahara Square - A district on the opposite side of Tundratown's weather wall that uses its heat exhaust to create a permanent hot arid desert environment.
- Rainforest District - A heavily forested district with major sprinkler irrigation for a humid warm environment.
- Savanna Central - The central district of the city as its major business hub and government seat.
- Little Rodentia - A walled urban area sized for mice and similar rodent species where they can live without danger from larger animals.
- Meadowlands - No information available.
- Outback Island - A distant remote region resembling Australia with its distinct species.
- Canal District - No information available.
- Marsh Market - A salt marsh area primarily attuned for pinnipeds, cetaceans, and small marine mammals. It was relatively isolated from the rest of the city, with one major form of transportation of the area being an extensive water tube. That tube allows for extraordinary amount of speed, but given its considerable length in which the users are kept completely submerged the entire time, land species attempting to use it have a serious risk of drowning midway, although there are emergency exits that can be accessed with some difficulty. Noted for its loose dress code standards, it was also where Zootopia's reptile population hid in an underground society for a century after Ebenezer Lynxley framed Agnes De'Snake and all reptiles until the day when Ebenezer Lynxley's crimes were exposed by Judy Hopps, Nick Wilde, Gary De'Snake, and Nibbles Maplestick.
- Reptile Ravine - The district for the reptile population. After Ebenezer Lynxley framed Agnes De'Snake for the murder of his tortoise maid, the reptile population was driven out when Lynxley used De'Snake's own invention of the weather walls to expand Tundratown's arctic environment into this region, making it uninhabitable for cold-blooded animals. After the Lynxley family's crimes were exposed by Judy, Nick, Gary, and Nibbles, this district's proper climate setting was restored for the reptile population to return as part of their reintegration with the city as a whole.

=== Bunnyburrow ===
Bunnyburrow is a fictional rural town located 211 miles away from Zootopia with a population of over 81 million animals. It is the birthplace of the franchise's protagonist Judy Hopps.

=== Outback Island ===
Outback Island is a distant region resembling Australia with its distinct wildlife.

== Cast and characters ==
List indicators

This section includes characters who will appear or have appeared in the franchise.

- An empty grey cell indicates the character was not in the film, or that the character's official presence has not yet been confirmed.
- ^{A} indicates an appearance through archival footage or audio.
- ^{Y} indicates a younger version of the character.

Characters	Feature films			Short films
Characters	Zootopia	Zootopia 2	Zootopia 3	Zootopia+
Characters	2016	2025	TBA	2022
Judith "Judy" Hopps	Ginnifer Goodwin Della Saba^{Y}	Ginnifer Goodwin	Ginnifer Goodwin	Ginnifer Goodwin^{A}
Nicholas "Nick" Wilde	Jason Bateman Kath Soucie^{Y}	Jason Bateman	Jason Bateman	Jason Bateman^{A}
Chief Bogo	Idris Elba	Idris Elba		Idris Elba
Benjamin "Ben" Clawhauser	Nate Torrence	Nate Torrence		Nate Torrence
Flash Slothmore	Raymond S. Persi	Raymond S. Persi		Raymond S. Persi
Stu Hopps	Don Lake	Don Lake		Don Lake
Bonnie Hopps	Bonnie Hunt	Bonnie Hunt		Bonnie Hunt
Mr. Big	Maurice LaMarche	Maurice LaMarche		Maurice LaMarche
Fru Fru	Leah Latham	Leah Latham		Leah Latham
Gazelle	Shakira	Shakira		Shakira
Duke Weaselton	Alan Tudyk	Alan Tudyk		Alan Tudyk
Finnick	Tiny Lister	Tiny Lister (Note: Due to Lister's death in 2020, an unused recording from the original film was repurposed for Zootopia 2 with permission from his family.)		Silent cameo
Yax	Tommy Chong	Tommy Chong		John Lavelle
Dawn Bellwether	Jenny Slate	Jenny Slate		
Peter Moosebridge	Peter Mansbridge	Peter Mansbridge		
Officer McHorn	Mark Rhino Smith	Mark Rhino Smith		
Frantic Pig	Josh Dallas	Josh Dallas		
Leodore Lionheart	J. K. Simmons	Photograph		
Priscilla	Kristen Bell	Silent cameo		Kristen Bell
Mrs. Otterton	Octavia Spencer	Silent cameo		Cameo on device
Gideon Grey	Phil Johnston			Silent cameo
Jerry Jumbeaux Jr.	John DiMaggio			
Nangi	Gita Reddy			
Manchas	Jesse Corti			
Doctor Madge Honey Badger	Katie Lowes			
Doug	Rich Moore			
Officer Higgins	Raymond S. Persi	Wilmer Valderrama		
Gary De'Snake		Ke Huy Quan	Ke Huy Quan	
Nibbles Maplestick		Fortune Feimster		
Pawbert		Andy Samberg		
Milton Lynxley		David Strathairn		
Brian Winddancer		Patrick Warburton		
Doctor Fuzzby		Quinta Brunson		
Jesús		Danny Trejo		
Fern Hoggbottom		Michelle Gomez		
Truffles		David Fane		
Zebros		Roman Reigns CM Punk		
Bloats		Stephanie Beatriz		
Bushron		Jean Reno		
Cattrick Lynxley		Macaulay Culkin		
Kitty Lynxley		Brenda Song		
Antony Snootley		John Leguizamo		
Judith		Cecily Strong		
EMT Otter		Yvette Nicole Brown		
Bearoness Bear		Yvette Nicole Brown		
Zeke		Dwayne Johnson		
Molly Hopps				Katie Lowes
Brianca				Katie Lowes
Mandy				Katie Lowes
Christine				Porsha Williams
Charisma				Crystal Kung Minkoff
Tru Tru				Michelle Buteau
Sam				Charlotte Nicdao

== Additional crew and production details ==
Occupation	Feature films			Short films
Occupation	Zootopia	Zootopia 2	Zootopia 3	Zootopia+
Director(s)	Rich Moore; Byron Howard	Jared Bush; Byron Howard	Trent Correy; Josie Trinidad	
Screenwriter(s)	Jared Bush; Phil Johnston	Jared Bush	Trent Correy; Josie Trinidad; Michael Herrera	
Producer(s)	Clark Spencer	Yvett Merino	Nathan Curtis	
Executive Producers	John Lasseter	Jared Bush	Jared Bush; Byron Howard; Jennifer Lee	
Composer	Michael Giacchino	Michael Giacchino	Curtis Green; Mick Giacchino; Michael Giacchino ("Duke: The Musical")	
Cinematography	Brian Lench; Nathan Warner	Tyler Kupferer; Daniel Rice	Joqauin Baldwin; Gina Warr Lawes	
Editor	Jeremy Milton; Fabienne Rawley	Jeremy Milton	Jeff Draheim; Shannon Stein	

== Reception ==
=== Box office performance ===
Film	Release date	Box office			Rank		Budget (millions)	Ref.
Film	Release date	North America	Other territories	Worldwide	All time North America	All time worldwide	Budget (millions)	Ref.
Zootopia	March 4, 2016	$341,268,248	$684,253,441	$1,025,521,689	80	56	$150 million	
Zootopia 2	November 26, 2025	$424,681,244	$1,425,676,724	$1,850,357,968	36	9	$150 million	
		$765,949,492	$2,109,930,165	$2,875,879,657			$300 million	

=== Reviews ===
Critical and public response of Zootopia
Title	Critical		Public
Title	Rotten Tomatoes	Metacritic	CinemaScore
Zootopia	98% (298 reviews)	78 (43 reviews)	A
Zootopia 2	91% (211 reviews)	73 (39 reviews)	A

=== Awards ===
Award	Category	Zootopia
Academy Awards	Best Animated Feature	Won
Annie Awards	Best Animated Feature	Won
Kids' Choice Awards	Favorite Animated Movie	Nominated
People's Choice Awards	Favorite Movie	Nominated

The film was chosen by the American Film Institute as one of the top ten films of 2016, and won the Academy Award, Golden Globe, Critics Choice Movie Award and Annie Award for Best Animated Feature Film. It also received a nomination for the BAFTA Award for Best Animated Film, which it lost to Kubo and the Two Strings.

== Music ==
=== Soundtracks ===
Title	U.S. release date	Length	Composer(s)	Label
Zootopia (Original Motion Picture Soundtrack)	March 4, 2016	62:34	Michael Giacchino	Walt Disney Records
Zootopia 2 (Original Motion Picture Soundtrack)	November 21, 2025	66:52	Michael Giacchino	Walt Disney Records

=== Singles ===
Title	U.S. release date	Length	Artist(s)	Label	Film
"Try Everything"	February 23, 2016	3:22	Shakira	Walt Disney Records	Zootopia
"Zoo"	October 10, 2025	3:12	Shakira	Walt Disney Records	Zootopia 2

== Other media ==
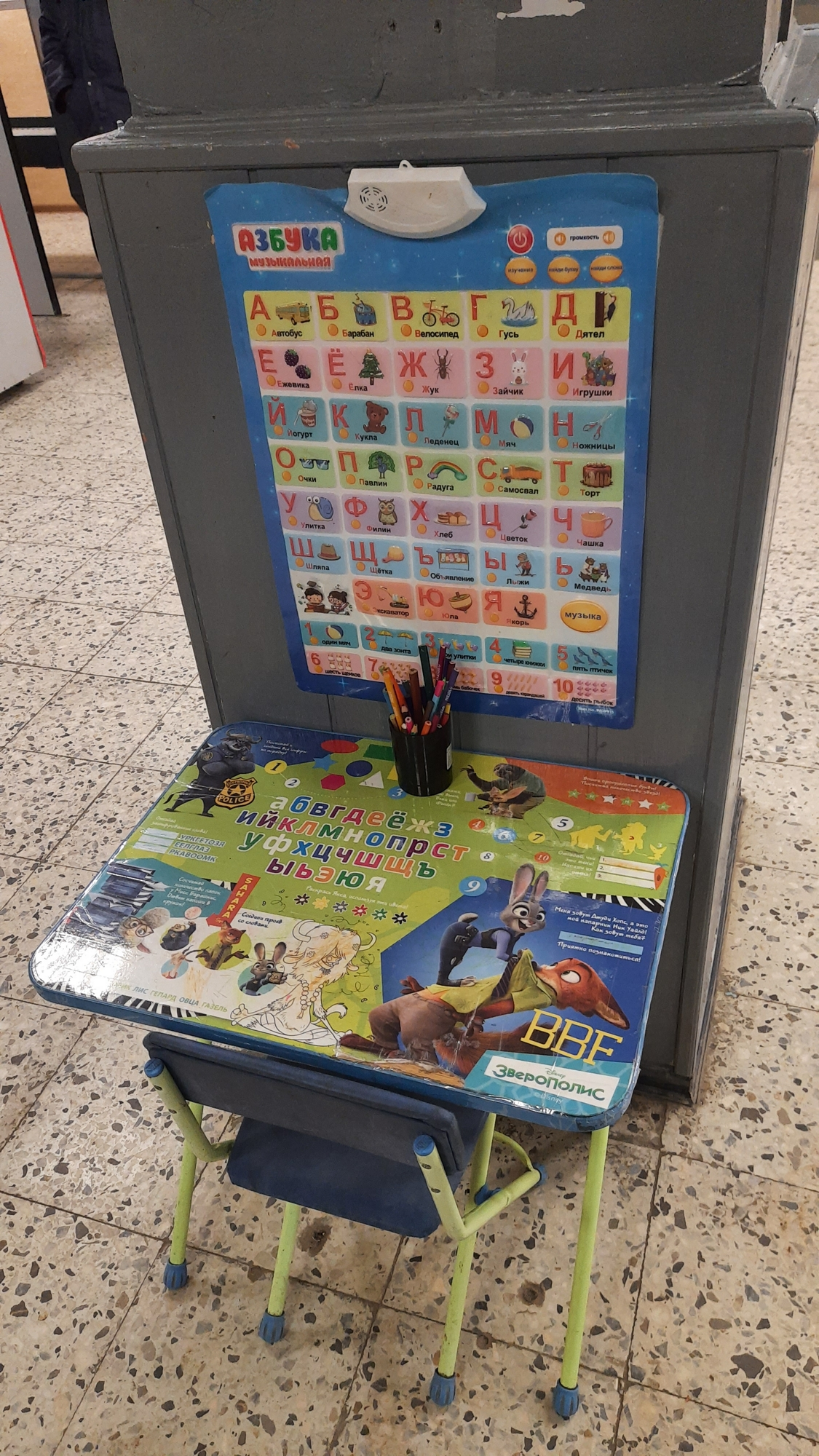
Example of Merchandising (in Russian)

=== Video games ===
Judy Hopps and Nick Wilde are included in Disney Infinity 3.0 as playable characters. As with other characters in the Disney Infinity series, figurines of them were released to interact with the game. In 2016 was launched the hidden object game Zootopia: Crime Files, in which Judy and Nick must solve a crime solving skills in puzzle games. The game ended up being shut down eventually. In the world-building game Disney Magic Kingdoms, several characters of Zootopia appear as playable characters, as well as several attractions based on places of the city of Zootopia. The video game Disney Heroes: Battle Mode includes Judy and Nick as playable characters.

In 2018 was released Zootopia: Racing Carnival, a racing game which includes the characters of the film as playable characters in races with their own cars. The game ended up being shut down eventually. Judy Hopps appears as a playable character in the video game Disney Mirrorverse.

=== Theme park attractions ===
Shanghai Disney Resort announced that a Zootopia theme-land was opened on December 20, 2023, at Shanghai Disneyland. It features the trackless dark ride Zootopia: Hot Pursuit.

In September 2023, at Destination D23, it was announced that a new show based on Zootopia would be created for the Tree of Life at Disney's Animal Kingdom. The show, titled Zootopia: Better Zoogether!, opened on November 7, 2025.

=== Comic books ===
Dynamite Entertainment announced they will be creating Zootopia comic books starting in January 2025.

=== Cameo appearances ===
Judy Hopps and Nick Wilde made cameo appearances in Disney Animation's 2018 film Ralph Breaks the Internet. Several characters from Zootopia have cameo appearances in Disney Animation's 2023 short film Once Upon a Studio. In addition, Judy and Nick made cameo appearances in the end credits of Disney Animation's 2023 film Wish. An image of Gary De'Snake appears during the end credits of Disney Animation's 2024 film Moana 2.
