= Ginnifer Goodwin =

American actress (born 1978)

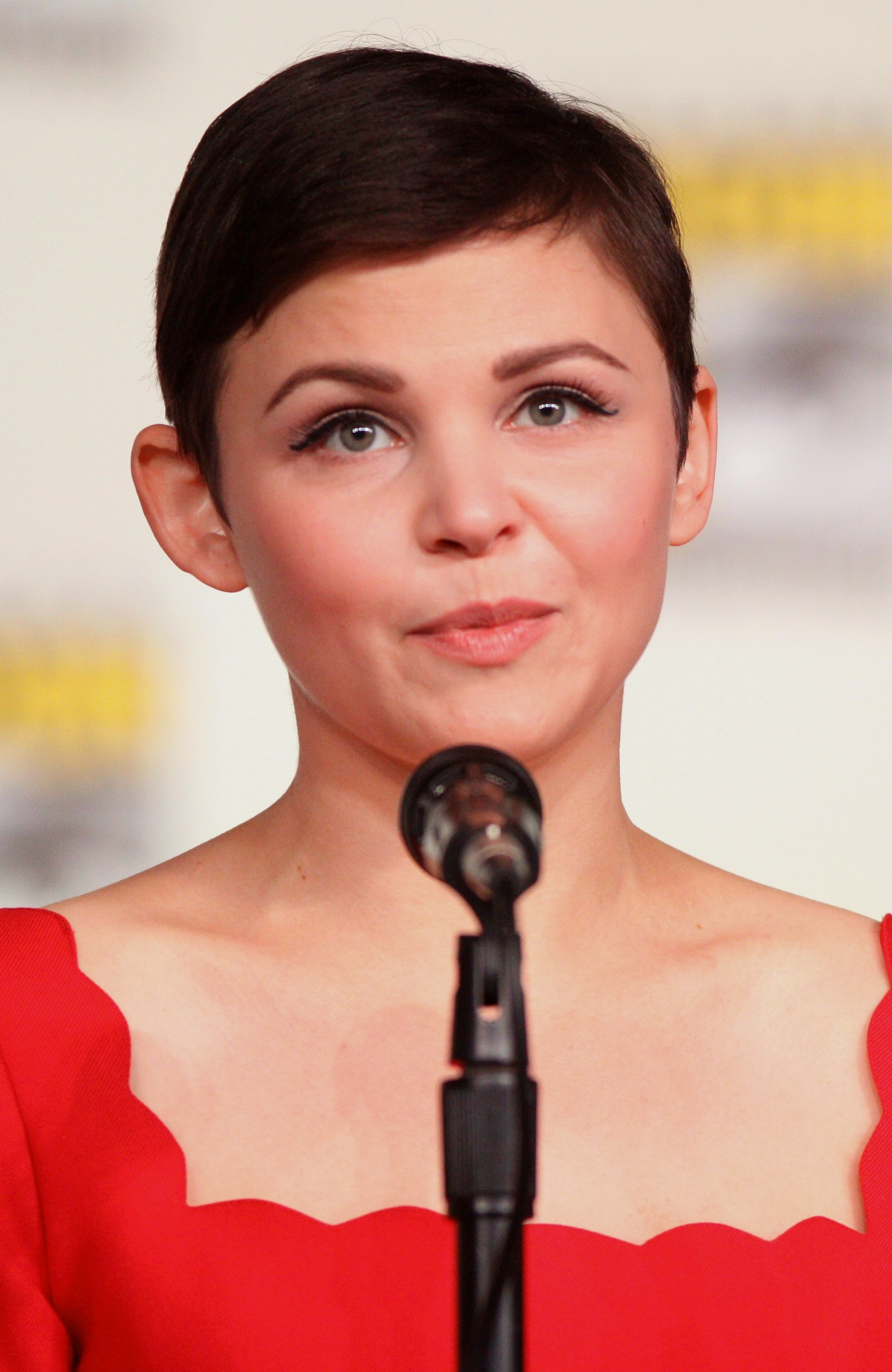
- Goodwin at the 2012 San Diego Comic-Con
- Born: Jennifer Michelle Goodwin; May 22, 1978 (age 48); Memphis, Tennessee, U.S.
- Education: Hanover College; Boston University (BFA)
- Occupation: Actress
- Years active: 1996–present
- Known for: Big Love; He's Just Not That into You; Once Upon a Time; Zootopia
- Spouse: Josh Dallas (m. 2014)
- Children: 2

Ginnifer Goodwin (born Jennifer Michelle Goodwin; May 22, 1978) is an American actress. She starred as Margene Heffman in the HBO drama series Big Love (2006–2011), Snow White / Mary Margaret Blanchard in the ABC fantasy series Once Upon a Time (2011–2018), Judy Hopps in the Zootopia franchise (2016–present), and Beth Ann Stanton in Why Women Kill (2019).

Goodwin appeared in films, including the drama Mona Lisa Smile (2003), the musical biopic Walk the Line (2005), the romantic comedy He's Just Not That into You (2009), the family comedy Ramona and Beezus (2010), the romantic comedy Something Borrowed (2011), and the biopic Killing Kennedy (2013). She also voiced the lead role of Fawn in the Disney animated fantasy film Tinker Bell and the Legend of the NeverBeast (2014).

== Early life and education ==
Goodwin was born in Memphis, Tennessee. Her mother, Linda (née Kantor) Goodwin, is a former teacher who also worked for FedEx. Her father, Tim Goodwin, formerly owned and operated a recording studio. Goodwin changed the spelling of her name from "Jennifer" to "Ginnifer" to make it distinct and to reflect how it is pronounced in her Southern regional dialect. Her younger sister, Melissa Goodwin, is a stop-motion animator on shows such as Robot Chicken.

Goodwin's mother is Jewish. Goodwin was raised attending both the First Unitarian Church and Temple Israel. As a child, she attended the Henry S. Jacobs Camp, a summer camp for Reform Jewish children in Utica, Mississippi. She was baptized as a child and also studied to have a bat mitzvah service, in the Jewish custom of recognizing her coming of age.

In her youth, Goodwin was affiliated with the North American Federation of Temple Youth. She was active in BBYO at the Jewish Community Center in Memphis. She attended the private St. Mary's Episcopal School in Memphis, Tennessee. She graduated from Lausanne Collegiate School in 1996.

She attended Hanover College (majoring in theater) for one year before transferring and completing her Bachelor of Fine Arts from Boston University. While a student at BU, she performed in numerous student short films, as well as several college and local stage productions. Goodwin was given the "Excellence in Acting: Professional Promise Award" by the Bette Davis Foundation, and graduated with honors. After her time at Boston University, she lived for a time in England and studied at Stratford on Avon's Shakespeare Institute in conjunction with the Royal Shakespeare Company. The following year, she earned an Acting Shakespeare Certificate from London's Royal Academy of Dramatic Art.

== Career ==
=== 1996–2010: Early work and independent roles ===
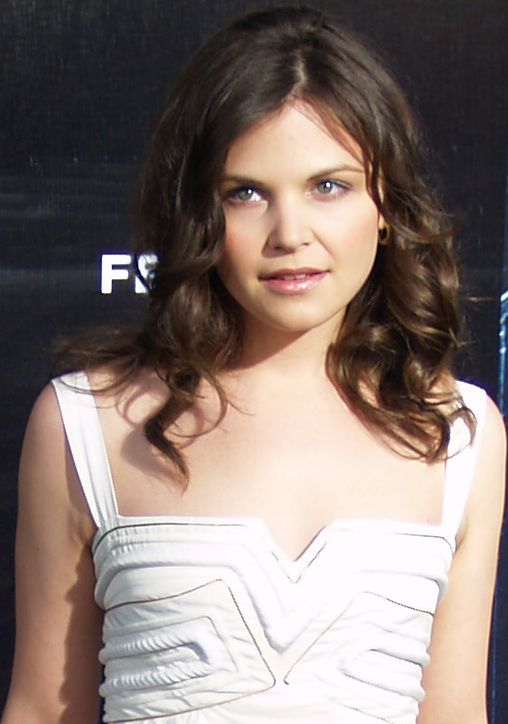
Goodwin in 2007

Goodwin first had roles in the NBC television programs Law & Order and Ed before appearing in the Comedy Central television movie Porn 'n Chicken. She later had substantial roles in the films Mona Lisa Smile, Win a Date with Tad Hamilton!, Walk the Line—in which she portrayed Vivian Liberto, Johnny Cash's first wife—and Birds of America. She also played Dori Dumchovic in the dark comedy Love Comes to the Executioner. Goodwin played a leading role as Margene Heffman, the third wife in a polygamous family, on the HBO original series Big Love, which concluded on March 20, 2011. Goodwin has done voice work in the Adult Swim series Robot Chicken, where her younger sister Melissa works as an animator.

In 2008, Max Mara honored Goodwin with a "Face of the Future" award, an award recognizing up-and-coming women in film.

Goodwin played Gigi in He's Just Not That into You (2009). For this role, she received a nomination for the People's Choice Award for Breakout Movie Actress. In April 2009, she began filming Ramona and Beezus, playing "Aunt Bea". The film was released on July 23, 2010.

=== 2011–2015: Breakthrough with Once Upon a Time and Zootopia ===
From 2011 to 2017, Goodwin played a leading role in the ABC fantasy drama series Once Upon a Time. She played both the fairy tale heroine Snow White and her real-world counterpart, schoolteacher Mary Margaret Blanchard. Goodwin and husband Josh Dallas left the show at the end of its sixth season to move back to Los Angeles with their family. They both returned to the series for its finale at the end of the seventh season.

Goodwin voiced Judy Hopps, the protagonist rabbit police officer in Disney's Zootopia in 2016, as well as Fawn in Disney's 2011 animated film Tinker Bell and the Legend of the Neverbeast. She also voiced Gwen, a kitchen maid who wants to be an inventor, in the animated series Sofia The First.

=== 2016–present: Current work and return to Zootopia ===
In January 2017, Goodwin was cast as Marianne in the Los Angeles production of Constellations. The play ran from June 14 to July 23, 2017, at the Geffen Playhouse.

In 2019, Goodwin appeared in episodes of the anthology series The Twilight Zone and Heartstrings. Also in 2019, she starred as Beth Ann Stanton in the first season of the CBS All Access dark comedy-drama series Why Women Kill.

Goodwin played Jodie in the Fox comedy series Pivoting, which premiered on January 9, 2022. The show was cancelled after one season.

Archive audio of Goodwin as the character Judy Hopps was used in the animated anthology series Zootopia+, streamed on Disney+ in 2022. She reprised her voice role in Disney's Zootopia 2, released in November 2025, and will voice Judy Hopps again in Zootopia 3.

=== Theme Parks ===
Goodwin voices Judy Hopps in the Disney Parks attraction Zootopia: Better Zoogether!, which opened November 7, 2025 at Disney's Animal Kingdom in Lake Buena Vista, Florida.

== Personal life ==
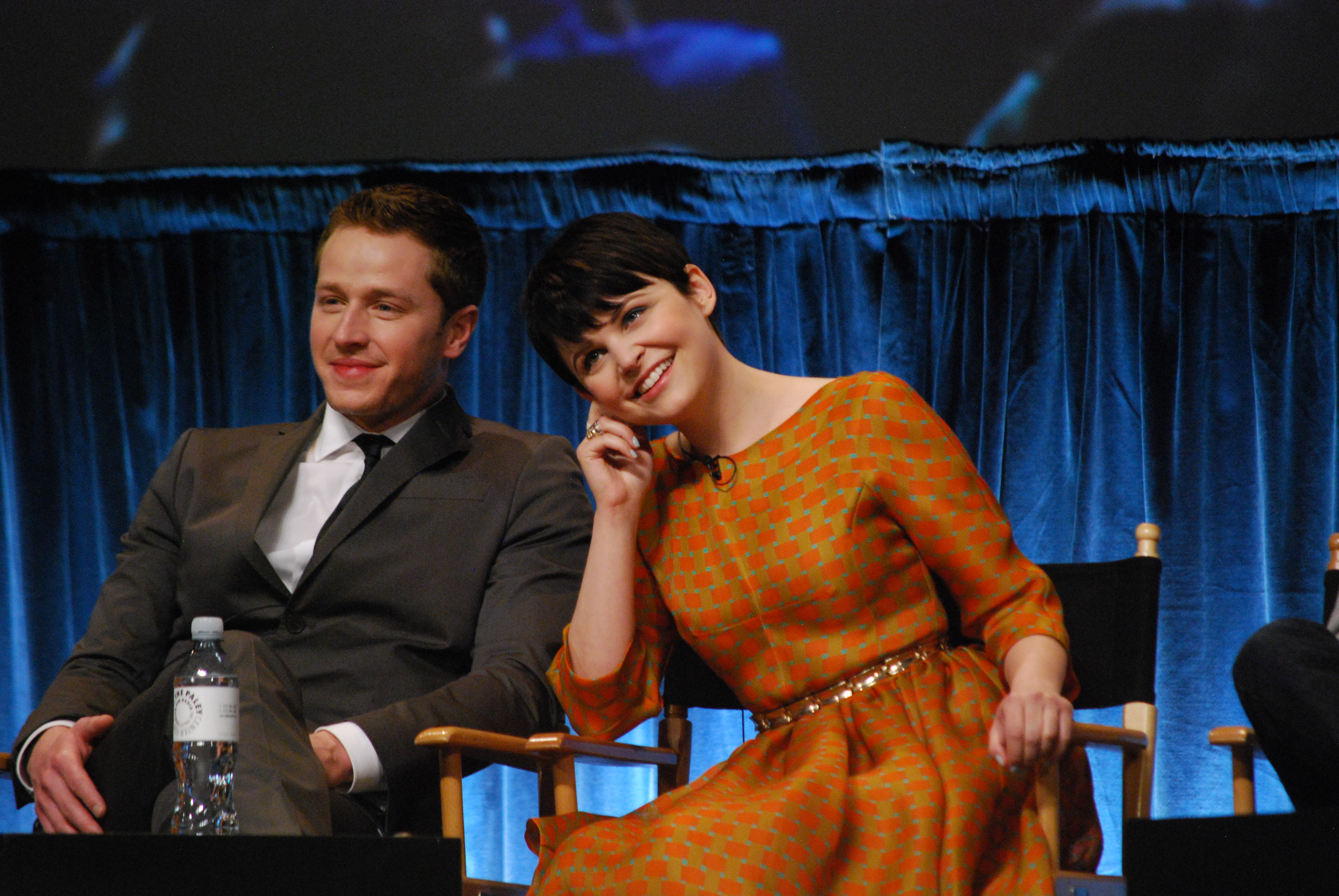
Goodwin with her husband Josh Dallas in 2012

Goodwin dated actor Joey Kern beginning in April 2009, and they became engaged in December 2010. They ended the engagement in May 2011. Goodwin subsequently began dating her Once Upon a Time co-star Josh Dallas in late 2011. They got engaged in October 2013 and married on April 12, 2014, in California. They have two sons, born in May 2014 and June 2016. The family lives in Encino, California.

In 2013, Goodwin said that after leaving Memphis, she "up and left Judaism for a very long time," and that "for 10 years, there was nothing. No ritual. No tradition. No community." She later reconnected with her faith and has said, "I was a Jew by birth, and now I'm a Jew by choice."

== Politics ==
Following the 2023 Hamas attacks on Israel, Goodwin has been vocal about her support for Israel on social media, calling for the return of hostages on her Instagram account. Goodwin also filmed a video for the American Jewish Committee in which she said that the phrase "Globalize the Intifada" is a call for widespread violence against Jews. In February 2024, Goodwin signed an open letter by Creative Community for Peace rejecting calls for Israel to be banned from Eurovision 2024. In September 2024, Goodwin attended Zionist activist Hen Mazzig's seminar Jews Talk Justice Laboratories in Los Angeles.

== Filmography ==
=== Film ===
| Year | Title | Role | Notes |
|---|---|---|---|
| 2000 | Zelda: An Extrospective Journey | Zelda | Short film |
| 2003 | Mona Lisa Smile | Constance Baker | |
| 2004 | Win a Date with Tad Hamilton! | Cathy Feely | |
| 2005 | Walk the Line | Vivian Cash | |
| 2006 | Love Comes to the Executioner | Dori Dumchovic | |
| 2007 | In the Land of Women | Janey | |
| 2007 | Day Zero | Molly Rifkin | |
| 2008 | Birds of America | Ida Tanager | |
| 2009 | He's Just Not That into You | Gigi Phillips | |
| 2009 | A Single Man | Mrs. Strunk | |
| 2010 | Ramona and Beezus | Aunt Beatrice | |
| 2011 | Take Me Home Tonight | Banky | |
| 2011 | Something Borrowed | Rachel White | |
| 2014 | Tinker Bell and the Legend of the NeverBeast | Fawn | Voice role |
| 2016 | Zootopia | Judy Hopps | Voice role |
| 2023 | Buddy Games: Spring Awakening | Celia | |
| 2023 | Once Upon a Studio | Judy Hopps | Voice role; short film |
| 2025 | Zootopia 2 | Judy Hopps | Voice role |

=== Television ===
| Year | Title | Role | Notes |
|---|---|---|---|
| 2001 | Law & Order | Erica | Episode: "Myth of Fingerprints" |
| 2001–2003 | Ed | Diane Snyder | Main role (seasons 2–3), 25 episodes |
| 2002 | Porn 'n Chicken | Maya | Television film |
| 2005-2014 | Robot Chicken | Various voices | Recurring voice role, 7 episodes |
| 2006–2011 | Big Love | Margene Heffman | Main role |
| 2007 | Big Love: In the Beginning | Margene Heffman | 2 episodes |
| 2009 | Crappy Holidays Presents... | Girlfriend | Episode: "Crappy Easter" |
| 2011 | SpongeBob SquarePants | Purple Haired Mermaid | Voice role; episode: "Welcome to the Bikini Bottom Triangle" |
| 2011 | Margene's Blog | Margene Henrickson | Episode: "Crush Story" |
| 2011 | Five | Charlotte | Television film |
| 2011–2018 | Once Upon a Time | Mary Margaret Blanchard / Snow White | Main role (seasons 1–6), Special Guest Star (Season 7) |
| 2012 | Electric City | Jean Marie St. Cloud | Voice role |
| 2013 | Killing Kennedy | Jacqueline Kennedy | Television film |
| 2014 | Sofia the First | Gwen | Voice role; episode: "Gizmo Gwen" |
| 2015 | Who Do You Think You Are? | Herself | Episode: "Ginnifer Goodwin" |
| 2018 | Steps | Bea | Television film |
| 2019 | I Am Somebody's Child: The Regina Louise Story | Jeanne Kerr | Television film; also Executive producer |
| 2019 | The Twilight Zone | Eve Martin | Episode: "Point of Origin" |
| 2019 | Heartstrings | Genevieve | Episode: "These Old Bones" |
| 2019 | Why Women Kill | Beth Ann Stanton | Lead role (season 1) |
| 2021 | Earth to Ned | Herself | Episode: "Dream a Little Dream of Ned" |
| 2022 | Pivoting | Jodie | Main role |
| 2022 | Zootopia+ | Judy Hopps | Voice role; archival recordings |
| 2025 | SuperKitties | Pamster Glamster | Recurring voice role |

=== Video games ===
- Disney Infinity 3.0 (2015), as Judy Hopps (voice role)

== Theater ==
- Constellations (2017) at Geffen Playhouse, as Marianne

== Awards and nominations ==
| Year | Award | Category | Production | Result |
|---|---|---|---|---|
| 2010 | People's Choice Award | Favorite Breakout Movie Actress | Herself | Nominated |
| 2011 | Teen Choice Award | Choice Movie Actress: Romantic Comedy | Something Borrowed | Nominated |
| 2012 | Teen Choice Award | Choice TV Actress: Fantasy/Sci-Fi | Once Upon a Time | Nominated |
| 2013 | Teen Choice Award | Choice TV Actress: Fantasy/Sci-Fi | Once Upon a Time | Nominated |
| 2013 | People's Choice Award | Favorite TV Drama Actress | Once Upon a Time | Nominated |
| 2014 | People's Choice Award | Favorite Sci-Fi/Fantasy TV Actress | Once Upon a Time | Nominated |
| 2014 | Teen Choice Award | Choice TV Actress: Fantasy/Sci-Fi | Once Upon a Time | Nominated |
| 2015 | People's Choice Awards | Favorite Sci-Fi/Fantasy Actress | Once Upon a Time | Nominated |
| 2015 | People's Choice Awards | Favorite TV Duo (along with Josh Dallas) | Once Upon a Time | Nominated |
| 2016 | People's Choice Awards | Favorite Sci-Fi/Fantasy Actress | Once Upon a Time | Nominated |
| 2016 | Voice Arts™ Awards | Outstanding Motion Picture Animation, Best Voiceover | Zootopia | Won |
| 2016 | Alliance of Women Film Journalists | Best Animated Female (Note: Tied with Auliʻi Cravalho for Moana) | Zootopia | Won |
| 2017 | People's Choice Awards | Favorite Animated Movie Voice | Zootopia | Nominated |
| 2017 | Kids' Choice Awards | Favorite Frenemies (shared with Jason Bateman) | Zootopia | Won |
| 2025 | EDA Awards | Best Voiced Performance in Animated Feature | Zootopia 2 | Nominated |
| 2025 | St. Louis Film Critics Association Awards | Best Vocal Performance | Zootopia 2 | Nominated |
| 2025 | Washington D.C. Area Film Critics Association Awards | Best Voice Performance | Zootopia 2 | Nominated |
