= List of Zootopia characters =

Cast of Disney media franchise

The Disney media franchise of Zootopia consists of the animated film Zootopia (2016), its sequel Zootopia 2 (2025), the streaming television series Zootopia+ (2022), and other media appearances. All the characters in the franchise are anthropomorphic animals, in the first film and most media being all of them mammals, while in Zootopia 2 reptiles are also introduced.

== Main characters ==
=== Judy Hopps ===
Judy Hopps
- Judy Hopps as seen in Zootopia 2 (2025)
- First appearance: Zootopia (2016)
- Voiced by: Ginnifer Goodwin; Della Saba (child)

In-universe information
- Full name: Judith Laverne Hopps
- Nickname: Carrots (by Nick)
- Species: European rabbit
- Gender: Female
- Occupation: Police officer at the Zootopia Police Department; Carrot farmer (formerly)
- Family: Stu Hopps (father); Bonnie Hopps (mother); Molly Hopps (sister); Timmy Hopps (brother); Several brothers and sisters; Terry Hopps (uncle); Otto Hopps (grandfather); Gram Gram Hopps (grandmother)
- Home: Zootopia; Bunnyburrow (formerly)
- Age: 9 (beginning of Zootopia) 24 (Zootopia) 25 (Zootopia 2)

Officer Judith Laverne Hopps is a European rabbit and one of the central characters of the franchise along with Nick Wilde.

==== Development ====
For the initial production of the film, Judy was not the protagonist of the story, instead being a sidekick for Nick, with the plot centered around him. She was an already established lieutenant of the Zootopia Police Department, with the goal of assisting Nick in clearing his name after being framed for a crime he did not commit. To Nick, the Zootopia city was broken from the beginning, and following the story of a cynical protagonist would degrade both the message of the story and the city itself. With Judy being an optimistic protagonist, and her struggle to insert herself within the harsh world of reality, the story and themes made much more sense.

==== In Zootopia ====
Since Judy was a child, she has dreamed of becoming Zootopia's first police bunny, and although she finally succeeds, on her first day she is assigned to issue parking tickets as a meter maid. While she is working, she runs into Nick Wilde, a fox who wanted to buy his son, Finnick, a Jumbo pop but had no money, so Judy offers to pay for it. However, she discovers that Nick and Finnick are not father and son, but two con men who wanted to melt down the ice pop to resell as small popsicles. Subsequently, she pursues Duke Weaselton who has stolen some bulbs from a florist's shop, but although she catches him, the ruckus she causes enrages Chief Bogo. Between that and promising Mrs. Otterton to find her missing husband Emmitt, Bogo prepares to expel her from the police force for giving Mrs. Otterton false hope, but Assistant Mayor Bellwether intervenes and thwarts him. Instead, he offers Judy 48 hours to solve the case, or resign if she fails.

Investigating, Judy coerces Nick into helping her, and he introduces her to his friend Flash from the traffic department who supplies information about the limo in which Mr. Otterton was last seen. The limo turns out to belong to Mr. Big, a crime boss who is about to freeze Judy and Nick until he is stopped by his daughter Fru Fru, who recognizes Judy for saving her during Duke's chase. Mr. Big, grateful for saving his daughter, gives Judy the address of his limo driver, Manchas, who tells them that Otterton went savage and fled after attacking him. At that point, Manchas ends up going savage as well. Judy and Nick continue their investigation, discovering from traffic cameras that Manchas was taken in a van to an asylum, where they find Mr. Otterton and other missing predators, and that it is Mayor Lionheart who has them secretly locked up while doctors try to discover why they have become savage. Lionhart and his asylum staff are arrested.

Judy feels proud to have rescued the missing mammals, but in a press conference her accidentally inflammatory answers about predators negatively affects Nick. As more predators go savage, this now being reported on TV news, and the situation begins to cause chaos in the city, Judy decides to resign from the police force out of guilt. She returns to her family farm in Bunnyburrows to work with her parents, where she accidentally discovers that the flowers Weaselton had stolen are the likely cause of predators in Zootopia going savage.

Judy returns to Zootopia, and after tearfully reconciling with Nick, they continue to investigate the case together, and find that the animals going savage are being deliberately shot with pellets of a serum made from the flowers. Finally, they discover that the mastermind behind the plot is Bellwether, who tries to eliminate Judy by shooting Nick with the serum so that he will kill Judy. However, they have anticipated her and swapped out the serum pellets for blueberries, and Judy tricks her into detailing her plot while recording her, bringing her to justice. Subsequently, Nick joins the police force, becomes Judy's partner, and Bogo assigns the two to their first job together.

During the credits, Judy and Nick, together with most of the other main characters, attend Gazelle's concert.

==== In Zootopia 2 ====
Judy and Nick continue as partners at the Zootopia PD. After a mysterious reptile, named Gary, arrives in Zootopia and turns Zootopia upside down, the duo must go undercover to new parts of town to solve the case. In her zeal to clear their names, she briefly estranged from Nick, which was made worse when Nick was arrested upon being them being separated as Judy was forced to escape with Gary De'Snake and Pawbert. Eventually, after being nearly murdered by Pawbert's treachery, Judy is able to save Nick from his attempted self-sacrifice to stop Pawbert, allowing them to reconcile with mutual declarations of love before together pursuing and capturing Pawbert and arresting him and the rest of his family. With that, she and Nick are cleared of all charges, decorated, and assigned to recapturing the prisoners Nick accidentally released when he escaped prison.

During the credits, Judy and Nick attend Gazelle's concert at the Burning Mammal festival. In the post-credits, Judy puts her recorder pen on the window. After threatening her neighbors who were listening in upon her departure, a feather lands near it.

==== In other media ====
In Zootopia+, she appears in "Hopp on Board", where she is seen during her train trip into Zootopia. She also appears in "The Real Rodents of Little Rodentia", during the time that she saves Fru Fru in Little Rodentia. In "Dinner Rush", she and Nick are shown stopping Flash's car.

Judy is also a main character in the video game Zootopia: Crime Files, where she investigates cases with Nick. She also appeared as a playable racer in the racing game Zootopia: Racing Carnival. Judy also appears as a playable character in the video games Disney Infinity 3.0, Disney Magic Kingdoms, Disney Heroes: Battle Mode, and Disney Mirrorverse.

In Disney Parks, she is a meet-and-greet character at Disneyland and Walt Disney World. In the Shanghai Disneyland attraction Zootopia: Hot Pursuit, she and her newly appointed partner Nick are in charge of solving the Gazelle kidnapping case.

Judy has a cameo appearance in the 2023 short film Once Upon a Studio, where she comes out of a picture on the wall to take a group photo with the rest of the characters from Walt Disney Animation Studios.

==== Reception ====
In The Daily Telegraph, Rosa Prince singled out Judy Hopps as a welcome change for Disney animated feature film heroines. She found that unlike the stories from characters such as members of the Disney Princess franchise, focused on romance or family loyalty, her focus is on her dream career as a police officer and serving her city.

Alliance of Women Film Journalists awarded Judy the Best Animated Female award in 2016 (shared with Moana from the film of the same name after a tie).

=== Nick Wilde ===
Nick Wilde
- Nick Wilde as seen in Zootopia 2 (2025)
- First appearance: Zootopia (2016)
- Voiced by: Jason Bateman; Kath Soucie (child); Christopher Swindle (Disney Speedstorm)

In-universe information
- Full name: Nicholas Piberius Wilde
- Species: Red fox
- Gender: Male
- Occupation: Police officer at the Zootopia Police Department; Con artist (formerly)
- Family: Unnamed mother
- Home: Zootopia
- Age: 32 (Zootopia) 33 (Zootopia 2)

Officer Nicholas Piberius Wilde is a red fox, and one of the central characters of the franchise along with Judy Hopps.

==== Development ====
For the initial development of the film, Nick served as the film's protagonist. He was a wanted fox on a mission to clear his name after being framed for a crime he did not commit, with Judy Hopps, a lieutenant of the Zootopia Police Department, assisting him in achieving this goal. Nick also was every bit as sarcastic and cynical, but with a strong dislike towards the city of Zootopia, which was more of a dystopian society, with direct abuse and cruelty against predators. In production, the filmmakers felt the tale of optimistic Judy Hopps, an ambitious bunny that wants to achieve her dreams in what she believes to be a wondrous city, would make for a more compelling story with the message of preconceived notions.

==== In Zootopia ====
Nick is a con artist who tricks Judy into buying a large ice pop for his son because he had no money, later Judy discovering that his "son" is actually his partner Finnick, with whom Nick used the ice pop to resell small ice pops. Later, Judy asks for his help in solving the case of the disappearance of Emmitt Otterton, and although Nick initially refuses, Judy blackmails him with revealing that he has not filed his taxes. Nick introduces Judy to his friend Flash from the traffic department to find the limo where Mr. Otterton was last seen. The limo turns out to belong to Mr. Big, a crime boss Nick has had problems with in the past, and who is about to freeze Judy and Nick, until he is stopped by his daughter Fru Fru, who recognizes Judy for saving her in Little Rodentia. Mr. Big, grateful for saving his daughter, gives Judy the address of the limo driver, Manchas, who tells them that Otterton fled after attacking him. At that point, Manchas ends up the same as well. Later, after standing up to Bogo, Nick reveals to Judy that as a child he suffered discrimination from other children for the simple fact of being a predator.

Judy and Nick continue their investigation, discovering from the traffic cameras that Manchas was taken in a van to an asylum, where they find Mr. Otterton and the other 13 missing predators, in addition to discovering that it is Mayor Lionheart, who has them locked up away from the public. But the fact of having solved the case causes the inhabitants of Zootopia to be afraid that all predators will end up in the wild, and seeing that even Judy is afraid, he gets angry and offended seeing that he will always be discriminated against. Months later, Judy apologizes to Nick and asks for his help in solving the case, earning his forgiveness. Finally, they end up discovering that the mastermind behind all the plot was Bellwether, who they manage to set up to record her confession, bringing her to justice. Subsequently, Nick joins the police force, becoming Judy's partner, both being assigned by Chief Bogo to their first job as a team.

==== In Zootopia 2 ====
Nick and Judy continue as partners at the Zootopia PD. After a mysterious reptile arrives in Zootopia and turns Zootopia upside down, the duo must go undercover to new parts of town to solve the case. There is some irritation between them in light of Judy's reckless determination to solve the case regardless of their fact that they are framed fugitives from the law. They separated at the Honeymoon Lodge when the ZPD arrest him while Gary De'Snake and Pawbert spirit Judy away. Finding Nibbles Maplestick in prison, the pair escapes, and get a ride from Flash in his sports car to get to Judy and help her at a critical time. Eventually, at the weather wall, Nick is attacked by Pawbert, who had attacked Judy and then Nibbles as part of his plan to impress his abusive family. At near-certain sacrifice of his own life, Nick is able to get Gary's antivenom injector to the snake to save Judy, who then manages to save Nick from falling to his death with Gary's help. After confessing their mutual love, Nick and Judy pursue and capture Pawbert with Gary and Nibbles' help. With that success, Nick is cleared of charges and decorated with Judy, with their next mission to round up the criminals he accidentally freed.

During the credits, Nick and Judy attended Gazelle's concert at the Burning Mammal festival.

==== In other media ====
In Zootopia+, Nick makes a brief appearance in "Hopp on Board", making ice pops with Finnick. In "Dinner Rush", he and Judy are shown stopping Flash's car.

Nick is also a main character in the video game Zootopia: Crime Files, where he investigates cases with Judy. He also appeared as a playable racer in the racing game Zootopia: Racing Carnival. Nick also appears as a playable character in the video games Disney Infinity 3.0, Disney Magic Kingdoms, and Disney Heroes: Battle Mode.

In Disney Parks, he is a meet-and-greet character at Disneyland and Walt Disney World. In the Shanghai Disneyland attraction Zootopia: Hot Pursuit, being a rookie police officer, he and his new partner Judy are in charge of solving the Gazelle kidnapping case.

Nick makes a cameo appearance in the 2018 film Ralph Breaks the Internet when Vanellope visits the OhMyDisney.com website.

Nick has a cameo appearance in the 2023 short film Once Upon a Studio, where he comes out of a picture on the wall to take a group photo with the rest of the characters from Walt Disney Animation Studios.

== Characters introduced in Zootopia ==
=== Chief Bogo ===
Chief Bogo
- First appearance: Zootopia (2016)
- Voiced by: Idris Elba

In-universe information
- Species: African buffalo
- Gender: Male
- Occupation: Zootopia Police Department chief
- Home: Zootopia

Chief Bogo is an African buffalo who is the police chief of the Zootopia Police Department's 1st Precinct. His name originates from the Swahili word for African buffalo, "mbogo".

He is introduced very stern with Judy and does not take her joining the police force seriously, so he assigns her parking duty on her first day. After Judy causes a ruckus in Little Rodentia, when she offers to take on the case of Mr. Otterton's disappearance, Bogo gives her two days to solve the case or else he will fire her. After she fulfills her promise, he begins to accept her as just another cop. He is also secretly a Gazelle fan. At the end of the film once Nick also joins the police, he assigns him and Judy their first job as partners. During the credits, Bogo is seen dancing at Gazelle's concert.

In Zootopia+, Chief Bogo has a major role in the episode "So You Think You Can Prance", where Clawhauser convinces him to participate in the titular talent show, where they both end up dancing together. Although in the end, it all turns out to be Clawhauser's dream.

In Zootopia 2, Chief Bogo was displeased that Nick and Judy botched a sting on Antony Snootley's smuggling ring. While putting them up in partner's therapy, Bogo ends up giving them a make or break assignment involving a snake sighting. If they fail, their partnership is over. As the Lynxley family blames Nick and Judy for allying with Gary De'Snake to Mayor Brian Winddancer, Bogo is accidentally bitten by Gary and hospitalized. Following the Lynxley family's arrest, Bogo is cured of the snake venom.

Chief Bogo is also a supporting character in the video game Zootopia: Crime Files, and appears as a playable character in Disney Magic Kingdoms and Disney Heroes: Battle Mode.

In the Shanghai Disneyland attraction Zootopia: Hot Pursuit, Chief Bogo organizes an emergency briefing, where he announces that Gazelle has been kidnapped.

Chief Bogo has a cameo appearance in the 2023 short film Once Upon a Studio, as part of the group photo with the rest of the characters from Walt Disney Animation Studios.

Chief Bogo appears in the attraction Zootopia: Better Zoogether!, voiced again by Idris Elba. He was shown to be undercover in Sahara Square where Gazelle was going to perform.

=== Benjamin Clawhauser ===
Benjamin Clawhauser
- First appearance: Zootopia (2016)
- Voiced by: Nate Torrence

In-universe information
- Species: Cheetah
- Gender: Male
- Occupation: Officer at the Zootopia Police Department
- Home: Zootopia

Officer Benjamin Clawhauser is an overweight cheetah who works as a dispatcher and desk sergeant for the Zootopia Police Department's 1st Precinct. He is a huge Gazelle fan and he loves to eat doughnuts while he is working.

When Judy arrives at the police department, he quickly becomes friends with her. Clawhauser tries to keep Mrs. Otterly from meeting with Chief Bogo due to the police being busy with the missing mammals. He later informs Chief Bogo about Judy finding the missing mammals and learns that he has the same Gazelle app on his phone. When Judy solves the case of the disappearance of the predators, who had returned to their wild state, Clawhauser is transferred from his position from the front desk to Records due to the apparent danger regarding his status as a predator. In the end, once Judy and Nick manage to reveal the source of those status changes, Clawhauser happily returns to his post, while his fellow cops welcome him with a box of donuts. During the credits, Clawhauser is seen dancing at Gazelle's concert.

In Zootopia+, Clawhauser has a major role in the episode "So You Think You Can Prance", where he convinces Chief Bogo to participate in the titular talent show to impress Gazelle, where they both end up dancing together. Although in the end, it all turns out to be Clawhauser's dream as he receives the information from Judy on the missing mammals.

In the second film, Clawhauser was seen directing traffic in Tundratown. During the credits, Clawhauser attended Gazelle's performance at the Burning Mammal festival.

Clawhauser also appeared as a playable character in the racing game Zootopia: Racing Carnival the battle mobile game Disney Heroes: Battle Mode. and the world building game Disney Magic Kingdoms.

In the Shanghai Disneyland attraction Zootopia: Hot Pursuit, Clawhauser appears greeting visitors behind his reception desk.

Clawhauser has a cameo appearance in the 2023 short film Once Upon a Studio, as part of the group photo with the rest of the characters from Walt Disney Animation Studios.

Clawhauser appears in the attraction Zootopia! Better Zoogether, voiced again by Nate Torrance.

=== Dawn Bellwether ===
Dawn Bellwether
- First appearance: Zootopia (2016)
- Voiced by: Jenny Slate

In-universe information
- Species: Sheep
- Gender: Female
- Occupation: Assistant Mayor of Zootopia (formerly); Mayor of Zootopia (temporarily); Criminal
- Home: Zootopia

Dawn Bellwether is a diminutive sheep and the main antagonist of the first film.

She is introduced as Zootopia's deputy mayor. Due to the discrimination that small animals tend to have (often herself being treated with disrespect by Mayor Lionheart), she supports Judy's incorporation into the Zootopia Police Department and is happy to announce that she is offering to solve the case of Emmitt Otterton's disappearance, later helping her with it by showing her the security cameras of the city's traffic. When Mayor Lionheart is arrested for kidnapping Otterton and other missing predators, Bellwether assumes command of the city. However, Judy later finds out that she is the mastermind behind the plot that has caused the predators to revert to their feral state, as Bellwether is fed up with the contempt small animals like her suffer from predators. With Nick's help, Judy manages to expose Bellwether's plot and the latter is brought to justice alongside her accomplices. During the credits, a disdainful Bellwether is seen watching one of Gazelle's concerts in prison with other inmates.

In Zootopia 2, Bellwether is still incarcerated at the time when Nick was arrested. She did use some of her wool to decorate the furniture in her cell. When Nibbles Maplestick frees him, they unknowingly free Bellwether and the other inmates. Following the Lynxley family's arrest, Nick and Judy head out to round up the escaped prisoners, starting with Bellwether just before she can leave Zootopia. She is last seen during the end credits back in jail.

Bellwether has a cameo appearance in the 2023 short film Once Upon a Studio, as part of the group photo with the rest of the characters from Walt Disney Animation Studios.

Bellwether resurfaces as the main antagonist of the Shanghai Disneyland attraction, Zootopia: Hot Pursuit, where she escapes from prison and kidnaps Gazelle before her latest concert at the Zootopia Day Festival as part of a plot for revenge against the city. After being lengthily chased by Judy, Nick and their allies, she is defeated once more after becoming stuck in a sign of a Big Donut catering truck similar to Duke Weaselton in the original film.

Bellwether is also a recurring character in the Disney Villains franchise. She is one of the villains included in the Disney Villains: Unfairly Ever After attraction at Disney's Hollywood Studios.

Bellwether appears as a playable character in the video games Disney Heroes: Battle Mode and Disney Magic Kingdoms.

Bellewether appears in the attraction Zootopia: Better Zoogether!, with Jenny Slate reprising her role. She poses as a wolf hostess named Heidi Howler as part of a plot to ruin Zoogether Day that initially succeeds, only to be exposed and defeated by Judy and Nick again.

=== Leodore Lionheart ===
Leodore Lionheart
- First appearance: Zootopia (2016)
- Voiced by: J. K. Simmons

In-universe information
- Species: East African lion
- Gender: Male
- Occupation: Mayor of Zootopia (formerly)
- Home: Zootopia

Leodore Lionheart is a noble, but pompous East African lion who is the former mayor of Zootopia.

Leodore Lionheart was first seen speaking at the ZPD Academy's graduation where he names Judy Hopps the first rabbit police officer. He ends up assigning her to Chief Bogo's precinct.

Leodore was next seen ordering Dawn Bellwether to take care of his work and to clear his afternoon while he goes out.

As Judy investigates the disappearance of Mr. Otterton, she discovers that Lionheart has all the missing predators locked up, which had reverted to the wild, and Lionheart was trying to hide them due to the citizens worrying that the same thing would happen to all the predators, including him. Accused of kidnapping, Lionheart is arrested alongside those involved, but he warns Judy that something bigger than he does not know is behind everything that happened. Upon Lionheart's arrest, his inferior, Bellwether, is sworn in as the new mayor.

Following Bellwether's arrest after she is exposed as the mastermind behind the epidemic, a news report details that the still-incarcerated Lionheart has denied any knowledge of the plot and claimed to the porcupine reporter that he was trying to save the city, justifying his own crime as a "wrong thing for the right reason".

During the credits, Lionheart is in his cell telling his unseen cellmate about the book he is reading.

While the novelization has Lionheart released from prison following Bellwether's arrest, the tie-in comics had Lionheart reinstated as the Mayor of Zootopia.

In Zootopia 2, Lionheart is succeeded by Brian Winddancer. He and Bellwether are alluded to by Milton Lynxley in his discussion with Winddancer. There were Easter eggs involving his desk portrait in Chief Bogo's trash can and a news article where he was found guilty of the abductions on the same newspaper detailing Bellwether's sentencing.

=== Mr. Big ===
Mr. Big
- First appearance: Zootopia (2016)
- Voiced by: Maurice LaMarche

In-universe information
- Species: Arctic shrew
- Gender: Male
- Occupation: Crime lord Business owner Baker and delivery boy (formerly)
- Family: Fru Fru (daughter); Unnamed son-in-law; Gram-mama (grandmother); Tru Tru (niece); Judith (granddaughter)
- Home: Zootopia; The Old Country (formerly)

Mr. Big is an Arctic shrew and crime boss in Tundratown and is served by a group of polar bears. His voice and personality is loosely based on Marlon Brando's portrayal of Vito Corleone from The Godfather.

When Judy and Nick are captured by his polar bear thugs, he proceeds to freeze them for trespassing on his property, but is stopped by his daughter Fru Fru, who tells him that Judy saved her life in Little Rodentia. Being grateful for saving his daughter's life, Mr. Big ends up telling Judy everything she knows about Mr. Otterton's disappearance. Later, he helps Judy and Nick by interrogating Duke Weaselton, threatening to freeze him. During the credits, Mr. Big and Fru Fru watch Gazelle's concert while in Koslov's paws.

In Zootopia+, he is the main focus of the episode "The Godfather of the Bride", where he tells the story of his life, how he came to Zootopia, and how over time he became the powerful man he is now.

In Zootopia 2, Mr. Big helps Judy and Nick when they have been accused of aiding the fugutive Gary De'Snake while also knowing more about the Lynxley family. In addition, Mr. Big helped to run Fru Fru's business. During this time, he and Fru Fru intimidate Nick into kissing Judith's candy ring. There was also a mentioning that Mr. Big plans to give Duke Weaselton some "cement shoes". During the credits, Mr. Big, Fru Fru, and Judith watch Gazelle's concert at the Burning Mammal festival on TV as Mr. Big's polar bears load Duke Weaselton into the trunk of a limousine.

Mr. Big also has a cameo appearance in the 2023 short film Once Upon a Studio, as part of the group photo with the rest of the characters from Walt Disney Animation Studios being carried by Koslov. He and his daughter are also seen during the end credits, talking with Bernard and Miss Bianca from The Rescuers.

Mr. Big and Koslov appear as playable characters in the video game Disney Heroes: Battle Mode. He also appear as a playable character in Disney Magic Kingdoms.

Mr. Big appears in the attraction Zootopia: Better Zoogether!, voiced again by Maurice LaMarche.

==== Fru Fru ====
Fru Fru
- First appearance: Zootopia (2016)
- Voiced by: Leah Latham

In-universe information
- Full name: Frubelina Big
- Species: Arctic shrew
- Gender: Female
- Family: Unnamed husband; Mr. Big (father); Gram-mama (great-grandmother); Tru Tru (cousin); Judith (daughter)
- Home: Zootopia

Frubelina "Fru Fru" Big is an Arctic shrew and Mr. Big's daughter. She befriends Judy after she saves her from a runaway donut sign in Little Rodentia, thanks to which she prevents her and Nick from being frozen by their father, whom she scolds for trying to freeze others on the day of her wedding. She also makes Judy the godmother and namesake of her daughter. During the credits, Fru Fru and Mr. Big watch Gazelle's concert while in Koslov's paws.

In Zootopia+, she is the main focus of the episode "The Real Rodents of Little Rodentia", showing the activities she does with her friends before her wedding, and the rivalry she has with her cousin Tru Tru. She also appears in "The Godfather of the Bride", during her father's toast after her wedding.

In Zootopia 2, Fru Fru was with Mr. Big when helps Judy and Nick when they have been accused of aiding the fugitive Gary De'Snake. She also started her own business which Mr. Big is helping out with. During this time, he and Fru Fru intimidate Nick into kissing Judith's candy ring. During the credits, Mr. Big and Fru Fru watch Gazelle's concert at the Burning Mammal festival on TV as Mr. Big's polar bears load Duke Weaselton into the trunk of a limousine.

Fru Fru also has a cameo appearance in the 2023 short film Once Upon a Studio, as part of the group photo with the rest of the characters from Walt Disney Animation Studios. She and her father are also seen during the end credits, talking with Bernard and Miss Bianca from The Rescuers.

Fru Fru appears in the attraction Zootopia: Better Zoogether!, voiced again by Leah Latham.

==== Koslov ====
Koslov
- First appearance: Zootopia (2016)
- Voiced by: Brian Hull (in Zootopia: Better Zoogether!)

In-universe information
- Species: Polar bear
- Gender: Male
- Occupation: Bodyguard
- Home: Zootopia

Koslov is a polar bear who is Mr. Big's bodyguard and most trusted henchman. He also serves as mode of transportation to Mr. Big and is the largest of the polar bears that work for Mr. Big. During the credits, Koslov holds Mr. Big and Fru Fru in his paws as they watch Gazelle's concert.

In the Zootopia+ episode "The Godfather of the Bride", Mr. Big relates that he and Koslov have been good friends since they were children.

In Zootopia 2, Koslov was with Mr. Big when they attended the Zootenial Gala, where he breaks a photographer's camera.

Koslov also has a cameo appearance in the 2023 short film Once Upon a Studio as part of the group photo with the rest of the characters from Walt Disney Animation Studios.

Alongside Mr. Big, he appears as a playable character in the video game Disney Heroes: Battle Mode.

Koslov had a speaking role when he appeared in Zootopia: Better Zoogether!, voiced by Brian Hull.

=== Flash ===
Flash
- First appearance: Zootopia (2016)
- Voiced by: Raymond S. Persi

In-universe information
- Full name: Flash Slothmore
- Species: Three-toed sloth
- Gender: Male
- Occupation: Department of Mammal Vehicles worker
- Significant other: Priscilla (fiancee)
- Home: Zootopia

Flash Slothmore is the "fastest" three-toed sloth in the DMV (short for Department of Mammal Vehicles).

Judy and Nick ask him for help finding the car where Mr. Otterton was last seen, but due to his slowness, it ends up nightfall when he finally manages to help them. In the film's finale, Nick and Judy end up chasing a speeding car, with Flash turning out to be the driver. Flash is later seen dancing with his partner Priscilla at Gazelle's concert during the end credits.

In Zootopia+, Flash has a major role in the episode "Dinner Rush", where he has a date with Priscilla, and the slowness of both sloths gets the waitress, Sam, out of her nerves. In the end, he ends up asking Priscilla to marry him and she accepts. He additionally offers to take Sam with them to the Gazelle concert (leading to the scene at the end of the film).

In Zootopia 2, Flash helps Nick and Nibbles Maplestick catch up to Judy, Gary De'Snake, and Pawbert. During the credits, Flash and Priscilla are seen doing a slow dance with the tortoise bouncer of the Reptile Hangout during Gazelle's concert at the Burning Mammal festival.

Flash is also a supporting character in the video game Zootopia: Crime Files, and appears as a playable character in the world building game Disney Magic Kingdoms and the mobile game Disney Heroes: Battle Mode.

Flash also has a cameo appearance in the 2023 short film Once Upon a Studio, where he heads to the elevator, angering Donald Duck for his slowness, and going down with other characters to take a group photo with the rest of the characters from Walt Disney Animation Studios.

Flash appears in the attraction Zootopia: Better Zoogether!, voiced again by Raymond S. Persi.

=== Stu and Bonnie Hopps ===
Stu and Bonnie Hopps
- First appearance: Zootopia (2016)
- Voiced by: Stu: Don Lake; Bonnie: Bonnie Hunt

In-universe information
- Species: European rabbits
- Gender: Stu: Male; Bonnie: Female
- Occupation: Carrot farmers
- Family: Judy Hopps (daughter); Molly Hopps (daughter); Timmy Hopps (son); Several children; Terry Hopps (Bonnie's brother/Stu's brother-in-law); Otto Hopps (Bonnie's father/Stu's father-in-law); Gram Gram (elderly member of the Hopps family)
- Home: Bunnyburrow
- Age: Stu: 60s to 70s Bonnie: 50s to 60s

Stu and Bonnie Hopps are two European rabbits from Bunnyburrow and Judy Hopps' parents. They work as carrot farmers.

They are concerned about Judy's decision to become a police officer, due to the dangers that can entail for a small animal like her. When she was little, they tried to convince her how risky it was and to become a farmer like them, although without success. When Judy grew up, they worried about her going to Zootopia to be a police officer, and reminded her to take care with all when saying goodbye to her at the train station. During a video call with their daughter, they were relieved to see that she was a parking officer as it was a safe job, unaware of how Judy feels humiliated by the assignment. Days later, Judy returned with them to work on the farm, much to their joy. In addition, they eventually impress Judy with the revelation that they took her ideals to heart, accepting the fox former bully, Gideon Grey, as their business partner as a much matured baker. When Stu and Bonnie explaining passing their family's bad experiences with the toxically psychotropic Night Howler plant to Judy, which she inspired her to suddenly return to Zootopia, leaving them confused. During the credits, they and their family are seen dancing at Gazelle's concert.

In Zootopia+, they are the focus of the episode "Hopp on Board", where after discovering that their youngest daughter Molly is on board the train to Zootopia, they both start chasing the train to take her back home.

In Zootopia 2, Stu and Bonnie talk to Judy in video chat again, giving their usual poor life advice to help deal with her "fox partner," although it is not clear if they are aware that Judy's relationship with that fox goes deeper than professional. During the credits, Stu and Bonnie are seen during Gazelle's concert at the Burning Mammal festival while avoiding the larger dancers.

=== Gazelle ===
Gazelle
- First appearance: Zootopia (2016)
- Voiced by: Shakira

In-universe information
- Species: Thomson's gazelle
- Gender: Female
- Occupation: Pop music star
- Home: Zootopia

Gazelle is a Thomson's gazelle who is a famous pop music star. She appears on pre-recorded broadcasts welcoming newcomers to Zootopia and speaks about the prejudice between the prey and predators while being protected by her dancers. During the credits, Gazelle holds a concert.

In Zootopia+, she appears in the episode "So You Think You Can Prance" as part of the jury of the titular talent show.

In Zootopia 2, Gazelle sings "Zoo" at the Lynxley family's Zootential Gala at Tundratown until Gary De'Snake came into view. She did get annoyed when the Zebros shoved one of her tiger dancers. When performing at the Burning Mammal festival, Gazelle helped Judy, Gary, and Pawbert out when they were being pursued by the Zebros and got even with the Zebros by allowing the threesome to escape as her tiger dancers fought the Zebros. During the credits, Gazelle sings "Zoo" at the Burning Mammal festival while aided by the LEMEEENS, a wildebeest marching band, and the reptilian musicians from the Reptile Hangout.

Gazelle also has a cameo appearance in the 2023 short film Once Upon a Studio, as part of the group photo with the rest of the characters from Walt Disney Animation Studios.

The Shanghai Disneyland attraction Zootopia: Hot Pursuit focuses on a plot where she is kidnapped by Bellwether before her latest concert.

Gazelle also appears as a playable character in the video game Disney Magic Kingdoms.

Gazelle appears in the attraction Zootopia: Better Zoogether!, voiced again by Shakira.

=== Finnick ===
Finnick
- First appearance: Zootopia (2016)
- Voiced by: Tommy Lister Jr. (in Zootopia); Kevin Michael Richardson (in Zootopia: Better Zoogether!)

In-universe information
- Species: Fennec fox
- Gender: Male
- Home: Zootopia

Finnick is a fennec fox who is Nick's partner-in-crime.

Finnick was first seen dressed as a baby elephant when they try to get a jumbo pop from Jumbeaux's Café which Judy managed to help them with when she noted to Jerry Jumbeaux that some of the servers were not wearing trunk gloves which is a health code violation. Judy later learns about Finnick's ruse when he and Nick use the jumbo pop to make Pawpsicles and sell them. Before leaving, Finnick tells a baby-talking Nick "You kiss me tomorrow, I'll bite your face off". The next day, Nick was pushing a disguised Finnick around when Judy ropes Nick into helping him. Noting that Judy hustled him, Finnick leaves telling Nick to have fun helping the police out. After returning to Zootopia upon learning about the Night Howlers, Judy asked Finnick where she can find Nick.

In Zootopia+, he makes a brief appearance in "Hopp on Board", making ice pops with Nick.

Following Tommy Lister Jr.'s death, archival recordings of him were used for Finnick's lines in Zootopia 2, where he helps Nick and Judy in an attempt to bust Antony Snootley.

Finnick also appeared as a playable character in the racing game Zootopia: Racing Carnival, the battle mobile game Disney Heroes: Battle Mode, and the world building game Disney Magic Kingdoms.

Finnick appears in the attraction Zootopia: Better Zogether!, voiced by Kevin Michael Richardson.

=== Duke Weaselton ===
Duke Weaselton
- First appearance: Zootopia (2016)
- Voiced by: Alan Tudyk

In-universe information
- Species: Least weasel
- Gender: Male
- Occupation: Small-time crook
- Home: Zootopia

Duke Weaselton is a small-time least weasel crook.

Judy apprehends Duke Weaselton after he robbed a flower shop. After his release, Duke was selling bootleg DVDs when Judy and Nick asked him about the buyer to whom he sold the Night Howlers. After he was intimidated by Mr. Big, Duke Weaselton pointed them in the direction of Doug.

In Zootopia+, Duke Weaselton is the main focus of the episode "Duke the Musical" where he rethinks his life through a musical number after Judy arrested him.

In Zootopia 2, Duke Weaselton was mentioned by Judith when her grandfather Mr. Big planned to make "cement shoes" for Duke Weaselton. He can be seen selling bootleg sequels in the water tube to Marsh Market. During the credits, Duke was seen being thrown into the trunk of a limousine by Mr. Big's polar bears as Mr. Big and Fru Fru watch Gazelle's concert at the Burning Mammal festival on TV.

His name is a reference to the Duke of Weselton from Frozen, also voiced by Tudyk.

=== Yax ===
Yax
- First appearance: Zootopia (2016)
- Voiced by: Tommy Chong (in Zootopia, Zootopia 2, and Zootopia: Better Zoogether!); John Lavelle (in Zootopia+)

In-universe information
- Species: Domestic yak
- Gender: Male
- Occupation: Hippie
- Home: Zootopia

Yax is a laid-back domestic yak who owns the naturist club Mystic Springs Oasis in Sahara Square. He talks like a stoner, but has the intelligence to run a business along with an excellent memory for detail without realizing it.

Yax was first seen when Judy and Nick visit Mystic Springs Oasis when looking for Emmit Otterton. He had more knowledge about where he went than his yoga trainer Nangi. During the credits, Yax was seen at Gazelle's concert.

In Zootopia+, he has a brief appearance in the episode "Hopp on Board", where he is shown teaching an outdoor yoga class.

In Zootopia 2, Yax was seen attending the Burning Mammal festival at the time when Judy, Gary De'Snake, and Pawbert were running towards the climate wall associated with Tundratown.

Yax appears in the attraction Zootopia: Better Zoogether!, voiced again by Tommy Chong.

Yax appears as a playable character in Disney Heroes: Battle Mode.

=== Other Zootopians ===
- Major Friedkin (voiced by Fuschia!) is a polar bear drill instructor at the Zootopia Police Academy. She doubted that Judy would pass her classes here until she improved at each training exercise.
- Dharma Armadillo (voiced by Josie Trinidad) is a nine-banded armadillo who is the landlady of the Grand Pangolin Arms. She gives Judy her key when she moves to Zootopia.
- Bucky (voiced by Byron Howard) and Pronk Oryx-Antelerson (voiced by Jared Bush) are a greater kudu and a gemsbok, respectively. They are Judy's loud and cantankerous next-door neighbors at the Grand Pangolin Arms. In Zootopia+, they appear in the episode "Dinner Rush", arguing while they are in the restaurant. In the post-credits of Zootopia 2, Bucky and Pronk were heard listening in on Judy as she gets them to stop upon her departure by talking about a case where an animal made her eavesdropping neighbors disappear. Bush, co-director and co-writer of Zootopia who additionally voices Pronk, claimed after the first film had released that Bucky and Pronk are a gay married couple, though this is not established in the films or the episode in which they appeared.
- Zootopia Police Department's 1st Precinct is a precinct of the Zootopia Police Department that operates in Savannah Central and led by Chief Bogo. Most of the police officers had their names revealed in the film and Zootopia: The Essential Guide.
  - Officer McHorn (voiced by Mark Smith) is a black rhinoceros police officer who is part of the Zootopia Police Department's 1st Precinct.
  - Officer Anderson is a polar bear and member of the Zootopia Police Department's 1st Precinct.
  - Officer Delgato is an African lion and member of the Zootopia Police Department's 1st Precinct.
  - Officer Fangmeyer is a tiger and member of the Zootopia Police Department's 1st Precinct.
  - Officer Grizzoli is an arctic wolf and member of the Zootopia Police Department's 1st Precinct.
  - Officer Higgins (voiced by Raymond S. Persi in Zootopia, Wilmer Valderrama in Zootopia 2) is a hippopotamus and member of the Zootopia Police Department's 1st Precinct.
  - Officer Jackson is a tiger and member of the Zootopia Police Department's 1st Precinct.
  - Officer Bob Johnson is an African lion and member of the Zootopia Police Department's 1st Precinct.
  - Officer Krumpanski is a black rhinoceros and member of the Zootopia Police Department's 1st Precinct.
  - Officer Francine Pennington is an African elephant and member of the Zootopia Police Department's 1st Precinct. When Chief Bogo started by addressing the elephant in the room, he tells Francine "happy birthday". In Zootopia 2, Francine was seen in Dr. Fuzzby's therapy, where she is repeatedly frightened by her police partner Clark who is a mouse.
  - Officer Rhinowitz is a black rhinoceros and member of the Zootopia Police Department's 1st Precinct.
  - Officer Snarlov is a polar bear and member of the Zootopia Police Department's 1st Precinct.
  - Officer Wolfard is a Northern Rocky Mountain wolf and member of the Zootopia Police Department's 1st Precinct.
- Jerry Jumbeaux Jr. (voiced by John DiMaggio) is an ill-tempered African elephant who owns an ice cream parlor called Jumbeaux's Café, frequented by elephants and other larger mammals. He wouldn't let Nick and a disguised Finnick get a jumbo pop until Judy points out that some of his workers aren't wearing trunk gloves which is considered a health code violation. This caused Jerry to relent and give them a jumbo pop.
- Frantic Pig (voiced by Josh Dallas) is an unnamed pig, owner of the "Flora and Fauna" flower shop, who frantically asks Judy for help after Duke Weaselton robbed his shop. He later appears as a protester at Gazelle's peace rally arguing with a female leopard. In Zootopia 2, Judy and Nick commandeer the Frantic Pig's car when pursuing after Antony Snootley.
- Mrs. Otterton (voiced by Octavia Spencer) is a concerned North American river otter whose husband Emmitt has gone missing. After Emmitt is recovered, she gives Judy her gratitude. During the credits, the Ottertons are shown dancing at Gazelle's concert.
- Emmitt Otterton is Mrs. Otteron's husband who mysteriously disappeared along with several other predators from Zootopia. He was revealed to have been infected with the Night Howlers. After Bellwether and those involved are brought to justice, Emmitt and the rest of their victims are cured. During the credits, the Ottertons are shown dancing at Gazelle's concert. His name is a reference to the titular character of Emmet Otter's Jug-Band Christmas.
- Nangi (voiced by Gita Reddy) is an Indian elephant who works as a yoga instructor at Mystic Springs Oasis.
- Priscilla Tripletoe (voiced by Kristen Bell) is a three-toed sloth and Flash's co-worker at the DMV. During the credits, Priscilla and Flash are seen dancing at Gazelle's concert. In Zootopia+, she has a major role in the episode "Dinner Rush" where she has a date with Flash and the slowness of both sloths gets the waitress Sam out of her nerves. In the end, Flash ends up asking her to marry him and she accepts. In the credits of Zootopia 2, Priscilla and Flash were seen at the Burning Festival dancing at Gazelle's concert.
- Gram-mama is an Arctic shrew and Mr. Big's late grandmother. She is only mentioned in the first film, with a picture of her being seen in Mr. Big's office, who says that when she died he buried her with the skunk rug that Nick sold him. In the Zootopia+ episode "The Godfather of the Bride", Mr. Big tells how he and Gram-mama came to Zootopia from the Old Country, opening a business as bakers with "Grandmama's Bakery".
- Renato Manchas (voiced by Jesse Corti) is a black jaguar from who is a chauffeur for Zootopia's biggest limo company and is the personal chauffeur to Mr. Big. Judy and Nick go looking for him at his house in the Zootopia Rainforest District to ask him about the disappearance of Mr. Otterton. He ends up rendered savage by Doug who sniped him causing Manchas to attack Judy and Nick. Though they managed to trap him, the wolves working to Leodore Lionheart detained him and had him locked up at Cliffside Asylum. Manchas would later be cured of the Night Howlers' effects.
- Larry (voiced by Rich Moore) is a Northern Rocky Mountain wolf who works as a security guard at Cliffside Asylum.
- Gary (voiced by David Thibodeau) is an Arctic wolf who works as a security guard at Cliffside Asylum.
- Fabienne Growley (voiced by Fabienne Rawley) and Peter Moosebridge (voiced by Peter Mansbridge) are the snow leopard and moose anchors of the ZNN (short for Zootopia News Network).
  - The international versions have Peter Moosebridge replaced by a koala named David Koalabear (voiced by David Campbell) in the Australian version, a jaguar named Onçardo Boi Chá (voiced by Ricardo Boechat) in the Brazilian version, a Japanese raccoon dog named Michael Tanuyama (voiced by Kazumasa Kōra) in the Japanese version, and an unnamed giant panda in the Chinese version.
- Doctor Madge Honey Badger (voiced by Katie Lowes) is a honey badger scientist who helps Mayor Lionheart look for the cause of the animals' savagery. Because of Judy and Nick, she, Lionheart and those involved are arrested.
- Doug Ramses (voiced by Rich Moore) is a ram chemist and sniper who works for Bellwether.
- Woolter and Jesse (both voiced by John DiMaggio) are a pair of tough rams who are Doug's colleagues.

=== Other Bunnyburrow residents ===
- Gideon Grey (voiced by Phil Johnston) is a red fox from Bunnyburrow who used to bully the young rabbits and sheep when he was young. As an adult, he has reconciled with those he tormented and became a much-respected baker. In Zootopia+, he makes a cameo appearance in "Hopp on Board" where he is seen driving his van passed the Hopps as they chased the train to Zootopia.
- Travis (voiced by Byron Howard) is a black-footed ferret who is Gideon's childhood friend whom he accompanied to bully other children. He tries to correct Gideon's incorrect pronunciation of "DNA", but Gideon reprimands him for this.
- Judy's siblings are European rabbits who are Judy's brothers and sisters, and Stu and Bonnie's children. When Judy was young, Bonnie mentions that Judy has 275 brothers and sisters, which increased when she grew up by having more much younger siblings. In the Zootopia+ episode "Hopp on Board", two of them are identified as Molly and Timmy, and Stu also mentions others as Ally, Abby, Annie, Amy, Andy, Arnold, Ashley, and Archibald, with Bonnie also mentioning other called Aggie.
- Otto "Pop-Pop" Hopps (voiced by John Lavelle) is Judy's grandfather, Bonnie's father, and Stu's father-in-law. He is briefly seen at the train station getting bitten by one of Judy's siblings as the family says goodbye to Judy. Otto is later seen in the newspaper that Judy uses to wrap carrots after she returns to the farm where he is seen to have celebrated his 101st birthday. In the Zootopia+ episode "Hopp on Board", Bonnie asks him to take care of the children while she and Stu chase Molly.
- Bobby Catmull is a young cougar who assisted a younger Judy in the Carrots Day Festival play.

== Characters introduced in Zootopia: Crime Files ==
- Hurriet is a three-toed sloth who works as the Zootopia Police Department's forensic analyst. She helps Judy and Nick by analyzing the clues they find during their cases in the game.
- Detective Oates is an Icelandic horse who works as a detective at the Zootopia Police Department and assists Judy and Nick in their cases.

== Characters introduced in Zootopia+ ==
- Molly Hopps (voiced by Katie Lowes) is Judy's younger sister and the Hopps' youngest child. She has a major role in the episode "Hopp on Board", where she gets on the train to Zootopia in which her older sister travels, having her parents chase her to take her back home.
- Timmy Hopps is one of Judy's many brothers. He appears in the episode "Hopp on Board", where Stu warns Pop-Pop to be careful with him because he bites, and just in that moment he is seen biting his grandfather's arm.
- Brianca (voiced by Katie Lowes) is a black mouse and one of Fru Fru's friends. She appears in the episode "The Real Rodents of Little Rodentia", being a candidate to become the maid of honor of Fru Fru's wedding. She mentions having been married twenty-three times.
- Christine (voiced by Porsha Williams) is an Arctic shrew and one of Fru Fru's friends. She appears in the episode "The Real Rodents of Little Rodentia", being a candidate to become the maid of honor of Fru Fru's wedding. Something that characterizes her is always having a drink in her hand.
- Charisma (voiced by Crystal Kung Minkoff) is an arctic shrew and one of Fru Fru's friends. She appears in the episode "The Real Rodents of Little Rodentia", being a candidate to become the maid of honor of Fru Fru's wedding. She is shown all the time typing on her smartphone.
- Mandy (voiced by Katie Lowes) is a mouse ex-convict with a crazy appearance and one of Fru Fru's friends. She appears in the episode "The Real Rodents of Little Rodentia", being a candidate to become the maid of honor of Fru Fru's wedding.
- Tru Tru (voiced by Michelle Buteau) is an Arctic shrew and Fru Fru's cousin. She appears in the episode "The Real Rodents of Little Rodentia", where the constant rivalry with her cousin is shown.
- Rhino Boss (voiced by Imari Williams) is an unnamed black rhinoceros who appears in flashbacks of the episode "The Godfather of the Bride". He was a crime boss who in Mr. Big's childhood sowed chaos in the neighborhood where he lived until Mr. Big with the help of his friends ended up stop him by freezing him.
- Sam (voiced by Charlotte Nicdao) is a North American river otter who is the focus of the episode "Dinner Rush". She is a waitress who is looking forward to finishing her shift to go to Gazelle's concert. However, when Flash and Priscilla arrive at the restaurant, the slowness of the sloths is an obstacle to her plans.
- Gerald (voiced by John Lavelle) is a Chester White pig who has a German accent and works as a cook in a restaurant. He appears in the episode "Dinner Rush", rushing his employee Sam with her orders because the customers are waiting. He later chooses not to fire Sam, being awed by Flash's proposal to Priscilla.

== Characters introduced in Zootopia 2 ==
=== Gary De'Snake ===
Gary De'Snake
- First appearance: Zootopia 2 (2025)
- Voiced by: Ke Huy Quan

In-universe information
- Species: Lesser Sunda Islands pit viper
- Gender: Male
- Occupation: Reptilian rights activist
- Family: Unnamed father; Unnamed mother; Unnamed brother; Unnamed sister; Agnes De'Snake (great-grandmother)
- Home: Zootopia

Gary De'Snake (voiced by Ke Huy Quan) is a blue Lesser Sunda Islands pit viper who is pursued by Judy and Nick even after he accidentally poisoned Chief Bogo. His great-grandmother, Agnes De'Snake, was the original founder of Zootopia. Ebenezer Lynxley betrayed her by forging her patent as his own and then framed her for murdering his tortoise maid. With help from Judy, Nick, and Nibbles, the truth was revealed and Ebenezer's crimes were exposed to the public by his descendants. He and Judy are betrayed by Pawbert, who poisons Judy with snake venom administered similarly to how his grandfather did to his maid, and dumps Gary out in the snow, stealing his anti-venom pen – the only means to cure Judy. Although slowly succumbing to hypothermia, Gary comforts the demoralized Judy and uses her body heat so he can be able to move to help her. He alerts Nick who was fighting with Pawbert that Judy is barely alive and that the anti-venom pen is what will save her. Nick is able to toss the pen to Gary, who succeeds in curing Judy. The two then save Nick from falling to his death. He helps Nick and Judy defeat Pawbert and the other Lynxleys and locate his grandmother's house and her original patent. In the end, Gary is holding a house warming party with Judy's family, friends and co-workers, marking the reopening of the Reptile District that is thawed out, and is happily reunited with his family. During the credits, Gary was seen dancing with Nibbles at Gazelle's concert during the Burning Man festival.

Gary also appears as a playable character in the world building game Disney Magic Kingdoms.

Gary makes a cameo in the attraction Zootopia: Better Zoogether!

=== Nibbles Maplestick ===
Nibbles Maplestick
- First appearance: Zootopia 2 (2025)
- Voiced by: Fortune Feimster

In-universe information
- Species: Beaver
- Gender: Female
- Occupation: Podcaster
- Home: Zootopia

Nibbles Maplestick (voiced by Fortune Feimster) is a beaver blogger and conspiracy theorist who lives in Marsh Market. She allies with Nick and Judy when getting to the bottom of Gary's sightings. Brash, seemingly distracted but street-savvy, Nibbles serves as Nick's confidante when he reveals his loyalty-driven fear of losing Judy as a partner. During the credits, Nibbles was dancing with Gary during Gazelle's concert at the Burning Mammal festival.

Nibbles also appears as a playable character in the world building game Disney Magic Kingdoms.

Nibbles appears in the attraction Zootopia: Better Zoogether!, voiced again by Fortune Feimster. She helps to investigate the disappearing water in Marsh Market where wool was found clogging the water supply.

=== Lynxley family ===
The Lynxley family are a wealthy family of Canada lynxes. They claim to have created the city's climate walls and weather-specific districts.

==== Ebenezer Lynxley ====
Ebenezer Lynxley was the alleged architect of Zootopia's weather walls and the grandfather of Milton Lynxley. In the past, it was revealed that Ebenezer was merely the investor who worked on the climate walls with Agnes De'Snake. However, Ebenezer, realizing the great worth in Agnes's idea, would later take full credit for himself by framing Agnes in poisoning Tor-toise Shelldrick leading to the displacement of the reptile community by placing the climate wall for Tundratown to where Reptile Ravine was. His actions were exposed years later by Nick, Judy and Gary.

==== Milton Lynxley ====
Milton Lynxley
- First appearance: Zootopia 2 (2025)
- Voiced by: David Strathairn

In-universe information
- Species: Canada lynx
- Gender: Male
- Occupation: Business magnate
- Home: Zootopia

Milton Lynxley (voiced by David Strathairn) is the Lynxley family's current patriarch and the main antagonist of the second film. He is a ruthless business magnate who is obsessed with preserving his family's ill-gotten legacy. When it comes to the sightings of Gary De'Snake, Lynxley protects his family's legacy by lying to Mayor Brian Winddancer that Nick and Judy helped Gary and to have the ZPD arrest them. He later hears from Pawbert where Reptile Ravine is from Pawbert and sends him to destroy it. During the fight with his enemies, Lynxley is knocked out by Brian who finally stands up to him. After the truth of Ebenezer's actions were exposed, he and his children are arrested as the former vows revenge. When incarcerated, Lynxley argues with Cattrick and Kitty over whose fault it was as the other inmates give a negative look towards their cell. During the credits, a bitter Milton is seen with Pawbert as he shows him the "Partnership for Dummies" book in an attempt to get back on his good side, only to go back to reading it himself when his father gives him a disapproving glare.

==== Pawbert Lynxley ====
Pawbert Lynxley
- First appearance: Zootopia 2 (2025)
- Voiced by: Andy Samberg

In-universe information
- Species: Canada lynx
- Gender: Male
- Occupation: Mailroom worker
- Home: Zootopia

Pawbert Lynxley (voiced by Andy Samberg) is Milton's youngest son, the runt of the family and the secondary antagonist of the second film. Because of his self-awkward personality, Pawbert was considered to be a disappointment to the family, and Milton has him working in a mailroom. While originally seen as a helpful ally to both Gary De'Snake (who he smuggled into Zootopia with help from Antony Snootley) and Judy alike by acting as a motorcycle driver by being their partner in thwarting against his family, this is later revealed to be a façade when he betrays Gary and Judy in the weather walls' control room, using his great-grandfather's envenomation tool to poison the latter and lock the former outside to freeze him to death, confessing to be actually doing these things to impress his family and gain their acceptance and recognition from them, especially his father, as part of a espionage scheme of his to gain access and information of the original patent location and destroy it. He later returns home after a conflict with Nibbles and Nick. Pawbert at first is confronted with accusations and would never be part of the Lynxleys by his father, but soon gains favor in his youngest son after telling him where its original patent is there to destroy it for them in Reptile Ravine with his efforts led him to gain his father's praise and recognition as a Lynxley after all in Pawbert himself for his goals. Afterwards, he is then sent out to destroy the original patent and demolish Reptile Ravine. Pawbert is later thwarted by his enemies together in their efforts and then he was knocked out by Captain Hoggbottom at the scene and arrested by the ZPD. While Milton argues with Cattrick and Kitty behind bars, Pawbert looks out of their cell as the other inmates give negative looks towards the Lynxley family. During the credits, a bitter Milton is seen with Pawbert as he shows him the "Partnership for Dummies" book in an attempt to get back on his good side, only to go back to reading it himself when his father gives him a disapproving glare.

==== Cattrick Lynxley ====
Cattrick Lynxley
- First appearance: Zootopia 2 (2025)
- Voiced by: Macaulay Culkin

In-universe information
- Species: Canada lynx
- Gender: Male
- Home: Zootopia

Cattrick Lynxley is the family's eldest son with an imposing personality. While Cattrick teases Pawbert, Cattrick gets unnerved when his father Milton manhandles Pawbert. During the conflict with Nick, Judy, Gary and Nibbles, Cattrick was knocked out by Mayor Brian Winddancer and later arrested by the ZPD. He and Kitty later argue with their father behind bars as the other inmates give them negative looks.

==== Kitty Lynxley ====
Kitty Lynxley
- First appearance: Zootopia 2 (2025)
- Voiced by: Brenda Song

In-universe information
- Species: Canada lynx
- Gender: Female
- Home: Zootopia

Kitty Lynxley is Milton's sharp-tongued daughter and the family's middle child. While Kitty teases Pawbert, she is unnerved alongside Cattrick when Pawbert is manhandled by their father. She is shown to have sharp claws that are also poshly manicured. During the conflict with Nick, Judy, Gary and Nibbles, Kitty was knocked out by Mayor Winddancer and later arrested by the ZPD. She and Cattrick later argue with their father behind bars as the other inmates give them negative looks.

=== Mayor Brian Winddancer ===
Brian Winddancer
- First appearance: Zootopia 2 (2025)
- Voiced by: Patrick Warburton

In-universe information
- Species: Clydesdale horse
- Gender: Male
- Occupation: Mayor of Zootopia; Actor (formerly)
- Home: Zootopia

Mayor Brian Winddancer is a Clydesdale horse and a former actor who now is serving as the current Mayor of Zootopia in the second film whom he officially succeeds both Dawn Bellwether (after her arrest and imprisonment in her schemes) and Leodore Lionheart (by his own complicity in the missing 14 predators case) alike in the first film. Milton Lynxley lies to Winddancer by stating that Nick Wilde and Judy Hopps are helping Gary De'Snake and to have the ZPD arrest them. With some later encouragement from Nibbles, Winddancer stands up to Milton Lynxley and helps to defeat his family. During the credits, Winddancer can be seen dancing at Gazelle's concerat at the Burning Mammal festival.

Mayor Winddancer also appears as a playable character in the world building game Disney Magic Kingdoms.

=== Other characters introduced in Zootopia 2 ===
- Zootopia Police Department officers and workers introduced in Zootopia 2 include:
  - Dr. Q. Fuzzby (voiced by Quinta Brunson) is a quokka therapist who is in charge of the police partner therapy. During the credits, Dr. Fuzzby was seen dancing at Gazelle's concert at the Burning Mammal festival where she and her spray bottle were seen on top of a sawhorse.
  - Bûcheron and Chèvre (voiced by Jean Reno) are a markhor and bighorn sheep police officers who work as partners.
  - Bloats (voiced by Stephanie Beatriz) is a hippopotamus police officer.
  - Gene Zebraxton (voiced by Roman Reigns) and Gene Zebrowski (voiced by CM Punk), known as "The Zebros", are a plains zebra and a Sorraia (who has painted his fur and styled his mane to resemble a zebra himself), respectively. They are a duo of police officers behaving in a radical manner. They do earn the ire of Gazelle when they shove one of her tiger dancers and get their comeuppance from the tiger dancers later. During the credits, the Zebros were seen at Gazelle's concert operating the turntable with an implyment that they have made up with her.
  - Paul Moledebrandt (voiced by Josh Gad) is a mole police dispatch who is often seen working on his computer. He was first seen when Nick accidentally sends a soda can into his work station. Nick apologized to him as the soda can ruptured and blasted Paul out of his seat. Clawhauser later tried to bribe Paul with doughnuts to track Captain Hoggbottom only for Clawhauser to trip and get Paul stuck in a doughnut hole. He was still sitting on the doughnut when Chief Bogo was visited in the hospital. During the credits, Paul was seen dancing at Gazelle's concert before being launched into the air by a ruptured soda can that he was on.
  - S.N.F.R. (Specialized Natural Fauna Response) is a unit in the ZPD. They are first seen in a mission to bust Antony Snootely. The S.N.F.R. later became among the ZPD units that chase after Nick, Judy, and Gary.
    - Captain Fern Hoggbottom (voiced by Michelle Gomez) is a razorback who is a member of the ZPD and the no-nonsense leader of S.N.F.R. She was first seen when Chief Bogo reprimands Nick and Judy for botching their part in busting Antony Snootley. During the final battle, Captain Hoggbottom declined to use a poison dart on Judy as ordered by Milton Lynxley. She later helps them to defeat Pawbert. During the credits, Hoggbottom is seen at Gazelle's concert moving her head to the beat.
    - Truffler (voiced by David Fane) is a razorback and member of S.N.F.R. who serves as Captain Hoggbottom's partner. During the credits, Truffler is seen at Gazelle's concert with Hoggbottom moving his head to the beat.
  - Marlon Grizzby is a grizzly bear police officer for the ZPD. He was at Dr. Fuzzby's therapy where he was the partner of Dillon.
  - Greg Dillon is a nine-banded armadillo police officer for the ZPD. He was at Dr. Fuzzby's therapy where he was the partner of Marlon Grizzby who is uncomfortable with Greg grooming his hair.
  - Clark is a mouse police officer for the ZPD. He was at Dr. Fuzzby's therapy where he was the partner of Francine who was frightened of him.
  - Karen is a honey badger police officer for the ZPD. She was at Dr. Fuzzby's therapy where she was the partner of Joel.
  - Joel (voiced by Byron Howard) is a white-tailed deer police officer for the ZPD. He was at Dr. Fuzzby's therapy where he was the partner of Karen who kept attacking him for minor offenses causing Dr. Fuzzby to use her spray bottle on her.
- Antony Snootley (voiced by John Leguizamo) is a giant anteater smuggler that Nick and Judy tried to help bust, but fail causing them to get reprimanded by Chief Bogo. It was later revealed that Antony was the one who snuck Gary De'Snake into Zootopia on Pawbert's orders before his apprehension at the hooves of the Zebros. Nick and Nibbles Maplestick encounter him in prison as Nibbles angrily demands that Antony not call her a woodchuck. During the credits, Antony can be seen at Gazelle's concert.
- Zeke (voiced by Dwayne Johnson) is an accident-proned dik-dik. When Judy and Nick pursue Antony in a car chase, this causes Zeke to get stuck inside a tuba until the Jumbo Unit was called to blow him out of the instrument which catapults him far into the air. It was mentioned by different characters that they hope the ZPD finds Zeke.
- Bearoness Bear (voiced by Yvette Nicole Brown) is a famous brown bear who attends the Zootenial Gala. Nick secretly pickpockets her.
- Bob Tiger (voiced by Bob Iger) is a tiger weather forecaster.
- Deandra Bambino (voiced by Amanda Gorman) is a lesser kudu reporter at ZNN. She was seen reporting from the red carpet of the Zootennial Gala.
- Denny Howlett (voiced by Mario Lopez) is a wolf reporter who works at ZNN. He reports on the aftermath of the chaos that occurred at the Zootennial Gala.
- George Purrrnachleo (voiced by George Pennacchio) is a slim African lion reporter who works at ZNN. He covers the news about Milton Lynxley planning to expand Tundratown into Marsh Market.
- Agnes De'Snake is Gary's great-grandmother and the true founder of Zootopia. She was betrayed by her partner Ebenezer Lynxley, who stole her plans and framed her for murder. Before her arrest, she discovered that the tortoise maid that Lynxley murdered, who witnessed his scheme, saved her patent. She hid it in her home to keep it out of Lynxley's clutches, hoping that someone will one day find it and expose Lynxley's crimes. Her great-grandson and his friends eventually discovered it and revealed the truth to all of Zootopia.
- Tor-toise Shelldrick is a female Galápagos tortoise who works for Ebenezer Lynxley. After she saw Lynxley attempting to destroy Agnes' patent, she quickly recovered it and attempted to warn Agnes, but she was murdered by Lynxley before she can do so and Agnes was framed for the crime. Her efforts were not entirely in vain as Agnes found her patent in Shelldrick's hands and proceeded to hide it in her house to keep it safe from her traitorous partner. Shelldrick's name was revealed in the film's junior novelization.
- The unnamed dolphin bartender is a bottlenose dolphin who runs a watery outdoor bar called The Shell Hut in the Marsh Market Area.
- Russ (voiced by David VanTuyle) is a Pacific walrus who is a plumber and ferry escorter in the Marsh Market area. Nibbles tries to get information about any snake sightings from him. During the credits, Russ was seen attending Gazelle's concert at the Burning Mammal festival dancing in his inflatable pool. Russ appears in the attraction Zootopia: Better Zoogether! Nibbles tries to get information from him on how the water source got clogged only for him not to know the answer for that question.
- The unnamed juggling sea lion is a California sea lion operating as a juggler in Marsh Market. When Nick calls him a "seal", he gets offended as Nibbles corrects Nick by stating that the juggler is a sea lion. That is one of the juggling sea lion's anger issues outside of being offended by the customs of Marsh Market being violated like when he had chased Truffler away for giving him a coin as a tip which is a choking hazard. During the credits, the juggling sea lion was seen attending Gazelle's concert at the Burning Mammal festival while juggling to the music.
- Jesús (voiced by Danny Trejo) is a Mexican-accented plumed basilisk residing in Marsh Market. Nibbles Maplestick helps Judy and Nick find Jesús at the Reptile Hangout. He does give them the information they are looking for. When the ZPD raid the Reptile Hangout, Jesús managed to get away by running across the water. After the Lynxley family was exposed and arrested, Jesús was seen at the thawed out Reptile Ravine where he was having an ice pop. During the credits, Jesús was seen running across the crowd during Gazelle's concert at the Burning Mammal festival and then moving his head to the beat. Jesús appears in the attraction Zootopia: Better Zoogether!
- Buzz Shedley (voiced by Daniel V. Graulau) is an agama. He was a patron at the Reptile Hangout and ordered a drink from Molt Kohl.
- Armpit Pete (voiced by Hewitt Bush) is a leopard gecko and patron of the Reptile Hangout who was briefly seen attacking itself close to Nick alongside another leopard gecko.
- Molt Kohl (voiced by Alan Tudyk) is a green iguana waiter at the Reptile Hangout. He was seen serving a drink to Buzz Shedley.
- Slick Di'Giguani (voiced by Nick DiGiovanni) is a desert iguana who is the bartender of the Reptile Hangout.
- The unnamed tortoise bouncer is a Galápagos tortoise in an eyepatch who serves as the bouncer of the Reptile Hangout. During the end creidts, the tortoise bouncer was seen at Gazelle's concert at the Burning Mammal festival where he was slow-dancing with Flash and Priscilla.
- Jürgen Ziegenkäse and Berthold Hufschmerz (voiced by Jared Bush and Byron Howard) are two identical German-accented Saanen goats. They were climbing down the Cliffs of Coppenhoofen when they encounter Nick and Judy emerging from a water tube and direct them to the Honeymoon Lodge that Gary De'Snake was heading towards.
- The Prederal Prison Inmates are the prisoners in Zootopia's Prederal Prison where Dawn Bellwether is held.
  - Big Tig (voiced by Tig Notaro) is a bear prisoner.
  - Gramma Taller (voiced by Rachel House) is a giraffe prisoner.
  - Michael J. (voiced by Michael J. Fox) is an aggressive red fox prisoner. He is a parody of Biff Tannen from Back to the Future (also starring Fox).
  - Tuffy Cheeksworth (voiced by Mae Martin) is a gerbil prisoner who is friends with Big Tig.
- The LEMEEENS are a trio of lemmings who are a techno-music group that play the keyboard. They were seen performing with Gazelle at the Burning Mammal festival.
- Robert Furwin (voiced by Robert Irwin) is a koala who works at the airport as a ticket agent. An escaped Dawn Bellwether was seen trying to purchase a ticket from him before Judy and Nick take action.
