= Couple costume =

Practice of a couple wearing the same clothing

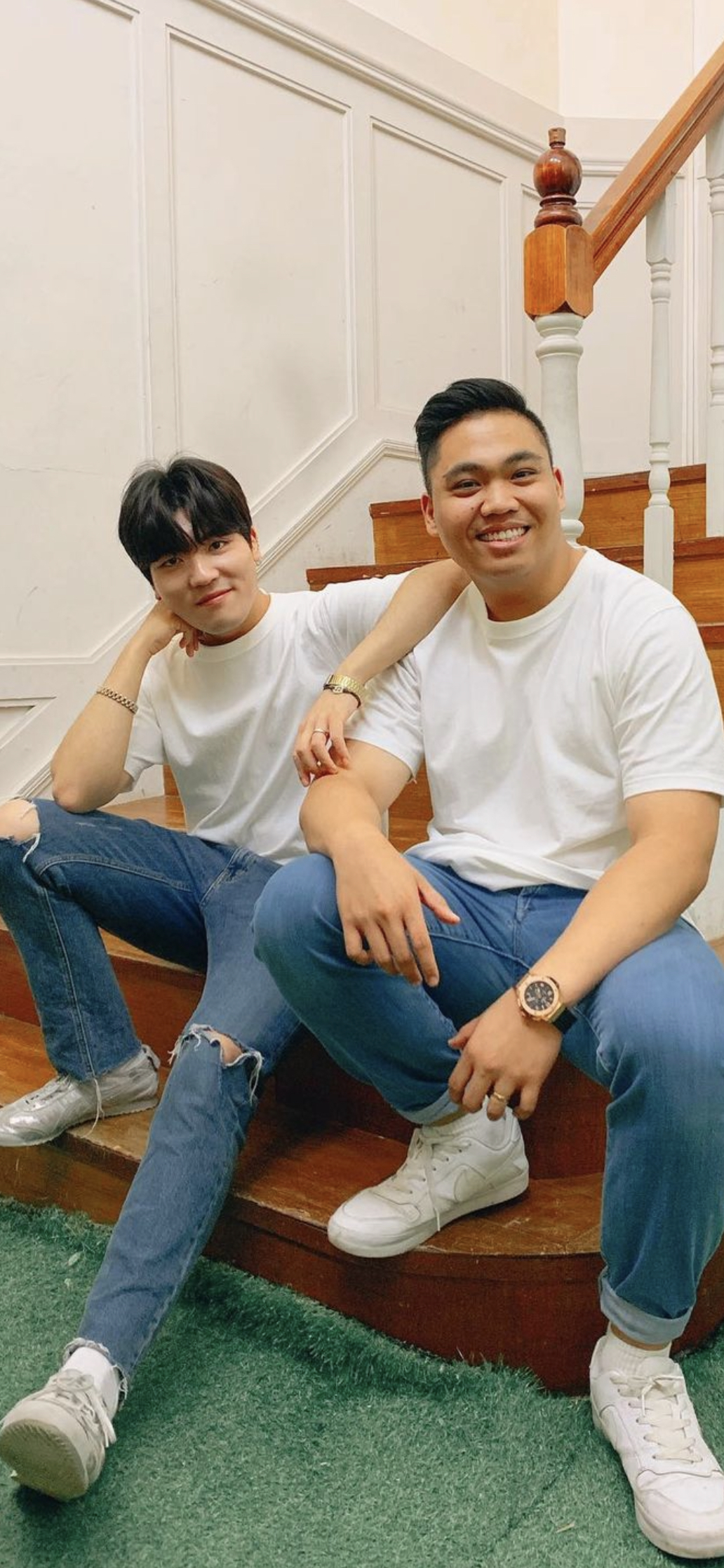
Korean Couple Costume: Yankee Blue Jeans

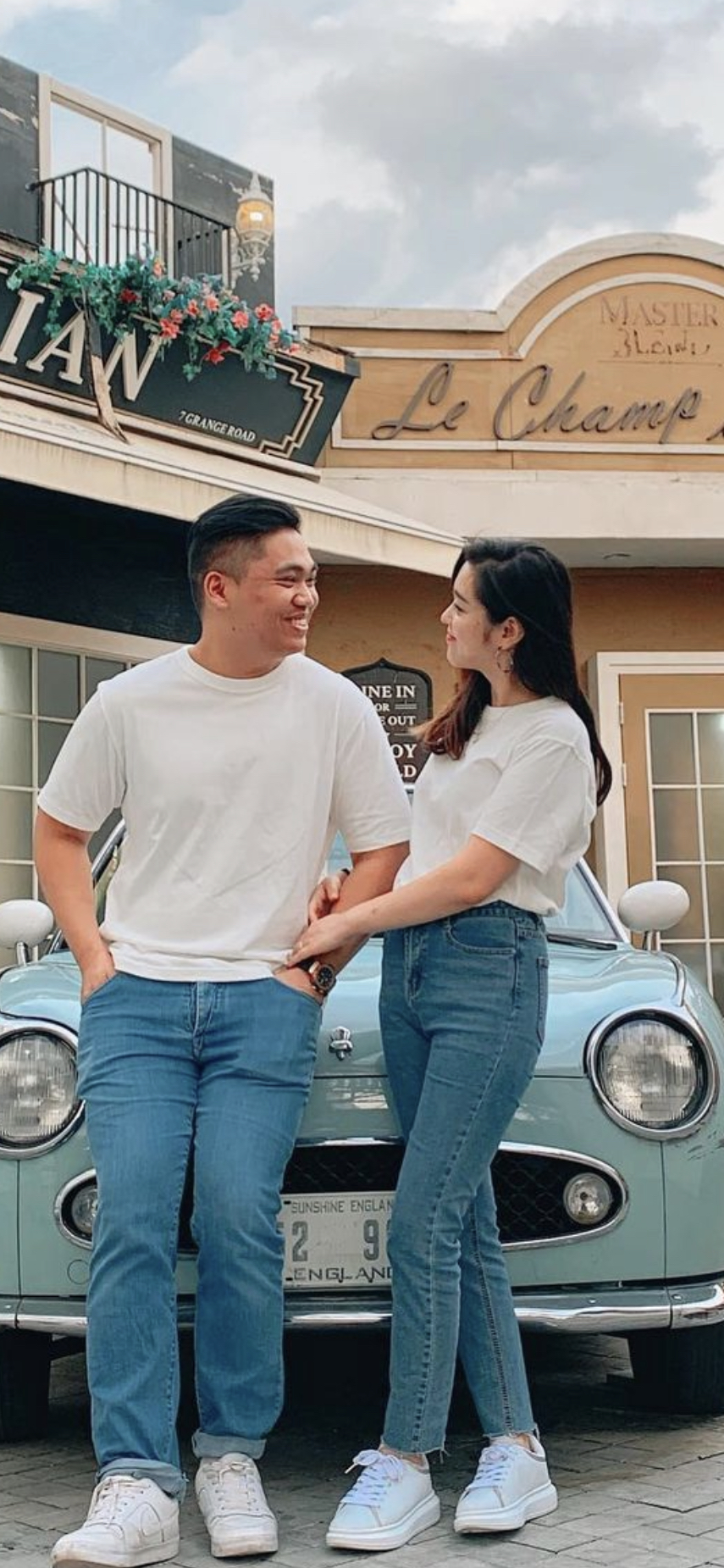
Korean Couple Costume: Americana

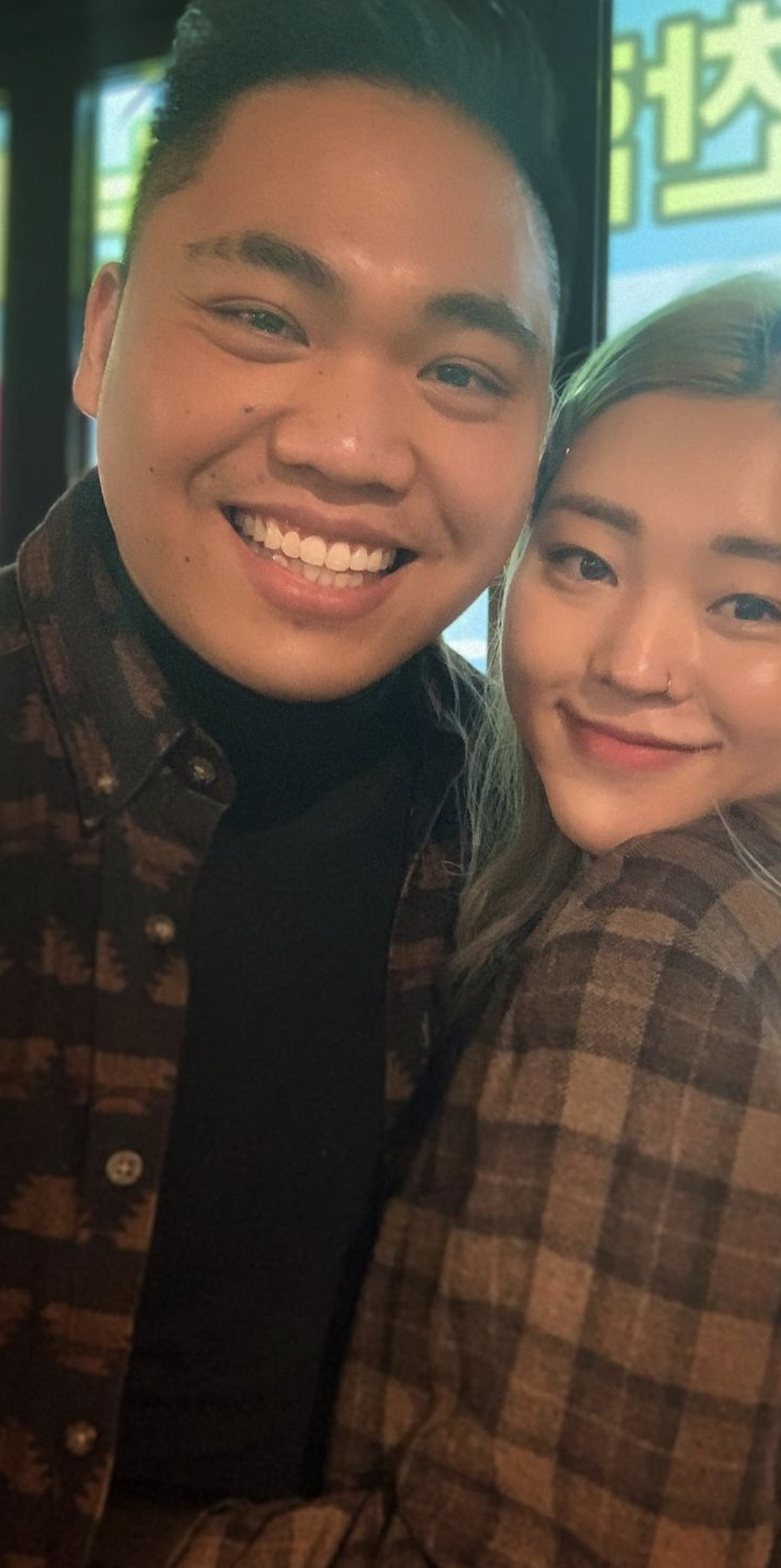
Korean Couple Costume: Lumbersexual

Outfit matching or couple costume/look are Chinglish and Konglish terms, respectively, for the practice of a couple wearing the same clothing in public to signal their relationship. It is mainly found in South Korea, Japan, Taiwan, and Vietnam and is becoming more common in mainland China.

When they are in love, young Asian lovers' tastes in fashion become similar. Couples have a unique way to announce their status by sporting the same wardrobe when they go out together or when on holiday. Today, it becomes a popular fashion trend among young couples. They usually wear corresponding T-shirts, shirts, hoodies, sweaters and jackets or coats. Because these clothes are often printed with funny graphics or slogans so they're suitable with young people.

== East Asia ==
According to Caroline Mniszak, Carrie Yodanis and Sean Lauer, the trend of couples wearing matching outfits began in South Korea in the 1990s, and spread to China and Japan. On the other hand, Nikkei states it was a trend in Japan in the 1970s and 1980s that faded out of popularity, only to make a comeback in the early 2010s. It's also called pair look in Japan. Judy Park writes that it started when celebrities began wearing coordinated matching outfits, and young Koreans followed the aesthetic. By the 2000s, the couple's clothes style had evolved into a large industry producing "his-and-hers" outfits. Couples select similar or matching clothing items or colors and wear them around the public. The trend has become increasingly popular due to social media such as Instagram, where couples post pictures with matching outfits.

In Korea, the style has come to symbolize a unified relationship of a couple. Its outward physical pairing intentionally shows a couple's commitment to one another and sharing experiences. Couples may wear matching clothes to demonstrate their love and devotion to each other and exemplify togetherness. The clothing trend is generally favored among younger couples as it is a more acceptable public display of affection than kissing. It is also speculated that the trend is so popular in Korea because of the cultural uniformity in society and style. Censorship in Korea is also another factor in which young couples seek to find ways to share intimacy without being persecuted.

== United States ==
In the United States, the style is less popular, mainly worn by celebrities. It might be referred to as matching outfits, twinning outfits or matchy-matchy. The trend has however existed for long, as Sadanduseless.com showcased over 20 ads for matching couple outfits in US magazines in the 1970s.

Mniszak, Yodanis and Lauer claim that the trend isn't as popular in the US because of a culture of individualism. In the US, couple costume is considered more worn for an event or holiday such as Halloween.

== Other Countries ==
People from other countries such as Canada and Sweden may find the style odd, as there matching clothes are usually worn by children who are twins. The trend can appear extreme from other countries' perspectives, as rings are usually the only matching thing among couples. Social media has led to the style becoming more popular by social media influencers and celebrities. However, the trend is not limited to just couples, as some families and friends also participate in the matching outfit trend. The trend has become a way to show unity and togetherness among loved ones, and it continues to evolve and gain popularity in different parts of the world.

== In other languages ==
- Vietnamese language: Áo đôi, Áo cặp (couple T-shirt)
- Japanese language: ペアルック (pair look) or おそろコーデ (matching couple outfits)
- Indonesian language/Javanese language: (Baju) sarimbit, usually made from batik. Not just shirts, but also formal wear and traditional costumes

== See also ==
- Impression management
- The Presentation of Self in Everyday Life
- Personal branding
- Reputation capital
