= Disney Magic Kingdoms =

2016 video game

- App icon featuring Mickey Mouse and some attractions
- Developer: Gameloft
- Publisher: Gameloft
- Platforms: iOS, Android, Windows
- Release: WW: March 17, 2016
- Genre: City building
- Mode: Single-player

Disney Magic Kingdoms is a 2016 city-building game developed and published by Gameloft for iOS, Android, and Windows. It is themed off the Disney Parks. The game was officially launched on March 17, 2016.

== Gameplay and story ==
The game takes place in the Kingdom, a place primarily based on Magic Kingdom and Disneyland. Mickey Mouse is the protector of the Kingdom. When Maleficent casts an evil spell on the Kingdom, ridding it of all its powerful magic, the players have to help it get back, creating their own park. Occasionally, Merlin appears as a guide to advance the story.

Progressing through the storyline unlocks more characters and attractions. Players can earn Magic and Experience by sending characters on quests and tasks, and sometimes Tokens to unlock or level up characters. Premium characters and attractions are unlocked using Gems, which are earned by leveling up characters, completing character collections, or viewing daily announcements.

The game features chests, occasionally hidden in the Kingdom, but can be bought for Gems, which award different prizes depending on the type of chest, such as attractions, Tokens, decorations, or concessions. Also in the game is Merlin's Shop, in which the player can obtain Tokens and attractions through Elixirs, which are obtained by exchanging them for decorations and concessions in Merlin's cauldron. The game also includes floats based on each franchise, which grant Magic, Tokens or Gems through parades.

Playing during Major Events players can unlock limited-time characters and attractions. Once the Events are over, this content occasionally returns in limited-time chests, and less frequently in other types of Events.

Some characters also have costumes, which can be obtained through Tokens, Gems, or as a prize at an Event.

For the most part, the characters in the game are involved in storylines that serve as a continuation of the events in their respective films. (Note: The characters from Tangled and the original Star Wars trilogy being an exception, where they recreate the same events as in their films, while the storylines with the characters of Bambi take place at some point of the protagonist's childhood, and the storylines with the characters of Lilo & Stitch are set either during or after the events of Lilo & Stitch: The Series.)

Starting in Update 60 (July 2022), the game introduced the Season Pass, with which for a period of 90 days, players can earn prizes by earning Happiness Points for the Kingdom by completing some quests, which include tasks that are daily, weekly, and during the Events. The Season Pass is divided between the Free Prizes, which include prizes for all players, and the Kingdom Pass, which is purchased through a real money purchase, with which players can get extra prizes.

== Voice Cast ==
The cast only applies to the characters whose voice actors have dialogues recorded in the game and not to the characters who have no dialogues recorded other than expressions they make. The voice-overs were removed in Update 38 in February 2020.

Despite the removal, voices of Pluto and Mickey were still heard when the player reaches a new level in the game. However, as of Update 42 in July 2020, the "Level Up" screen was replaced by a still image of Pluto and Mickey, removing the remaining voice-overs entirely in the game.

- Jeff Bennett as Merlin
- Bret Iwan as Mickey Mouse
- Bill Farmer as Goofy and Pluto
- Jim Hanks as Woody
- Joan Cusack as Jessie
- Annie Potts as Bo Peep
- Wallace Shawn as Rex
- R. Lee Ermey as Sarge
- John Ratzenberger as Hamm
- Tim Allen as Buzz Lightyear
- Tress MacNeille as Daisy Duck
- Russi Taylor as Minnie Mouse
- Jim Cummings as Pete
- James Patrick Stuart as Zurg
- Tony Anselmo as Donald Duck

== Reception ==
Common Sense Media's Neilie Johnson gave Disney Magic Kingdoms a three out of five-star rating, noting that "the first 10 minutes are fun for kids," but afterward, "wait times increase, and upgrading characters only results in a brief animation." She criticized the game for being "too focused on in-game purchases" and said that "long build timers and a poor placement system make it difficult to set things up in an attractive -- or even sensible -- way." Despite featuring "favorite Disney characters, an engaging narrative, familiar Magic Kingdom attractions, and real Disney music," she concluded that "it could be great with less focus on meaningless missions and money and more on creativity and fun," but as it stands, it "may appeal to older players who are already used to this mechanic."

Pocket Gamer's Ray Willmott gave the game a 2.5 out of 5, stating: "Disney Magic Kingdoms does a good job of placing you at the heart of an extravagant theme park, both in terms of recreating the wonder and mystery of exploration, and in replicating the arduous queuing system." However, he criticized the game for its "wait-timers," noting that "sometimes you have to wait as long as 6 hours to progress the story," which is frustrating, especially for younger players. He mentioned that "if you're not willing to nourish Disney Magic Kingdoms, that greed will take great pleasure in feeding you just enough to line your stomach, then starving you of content for hours at a time." Despite its beautiful visuals and engaging mechanics, he concluded that "the game's greed is difficult to look past," describing it as "the very worst of F2P, but with the fine polish and occasional quality of a premium release."

=== Player count and revenue ===
In December 2018, Gameloft announced that Disney Magic Kingdoms had generated $114 million in revenue since its launch in 2016. The game has since been downloaded over 70 million times. In late 2020 and early 2021, Gameloft said Disney Magic Kingdoms surpassed 100 million downloads worldwide. From June 3 to 18, 2021, sales of the Destiny the Whale Shark bundle generated over $284,000 in revenue, all of which Gameloft donated to Ocean Conservancy in support of ocean conservation.

In March 2025, Vivendi reported that Disney Magic Kingdoms, alongside Disney Dreamlight Valley, Asphalt Legends Unite, March of Empires, and Disney Speedstorm, collectively accounted for 57% of Gameloft's total revenues, ranking among the company's top five best-selling titles for the year of 2024. In the first half of 2025, these five games, including Disney Magic Kingdoms, remained Gameloft's top-performing titles. Together, they continued to generate 57% of the company's total revenue, reaffirming their place among its best-sellers.
