= Zootopia: Hot Pursuit =

Trackless dark ride at Shanghai Disneyland

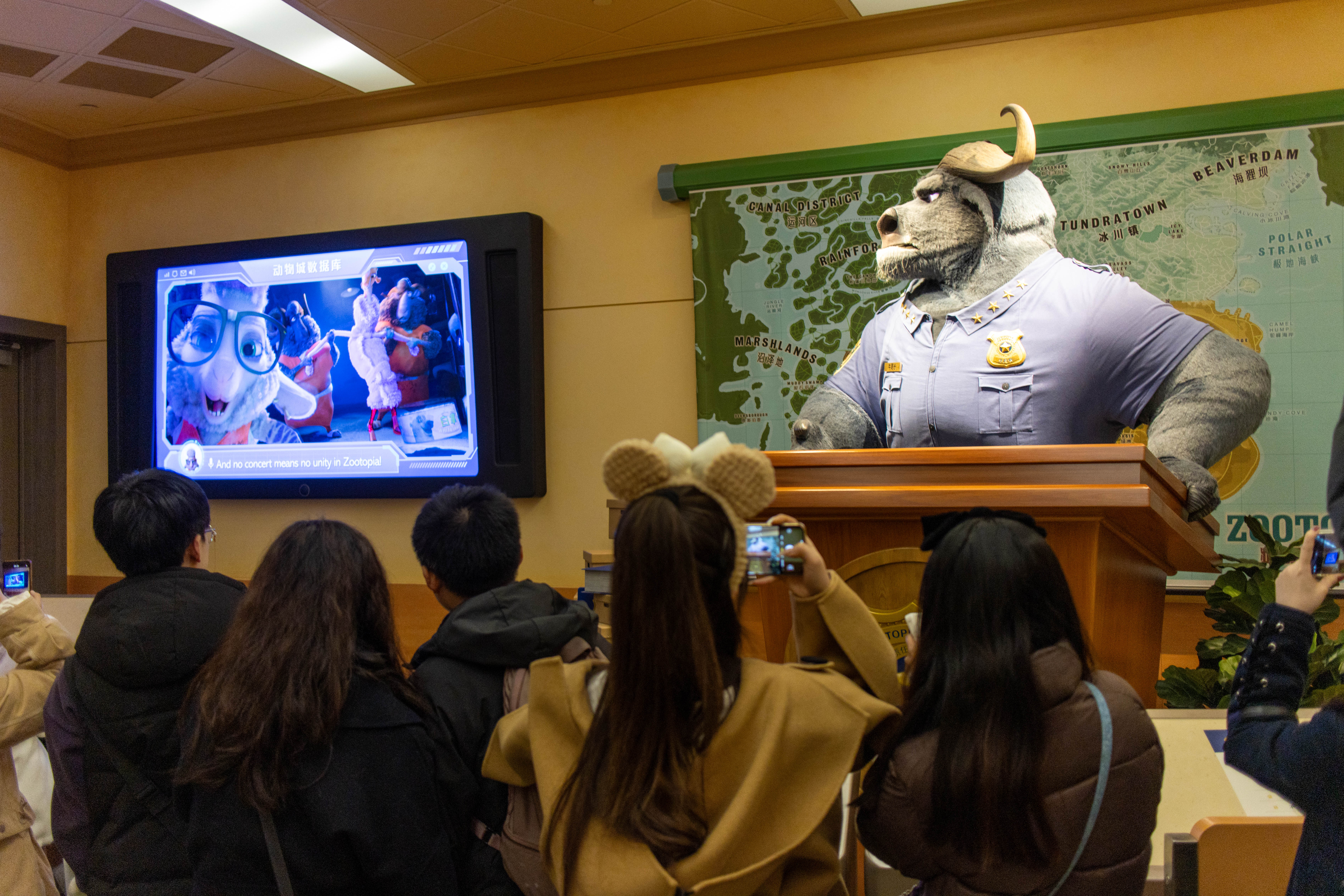

Shanghai Disneyland
- Area: Zootopia
- Status: Operating
- Opening date: December 20, 2023

Ride statistics
- Attraction type: Trackless dark ride
- Designer: Walt Disney Imagineering
- Theme: Zootopia
- Music: Michael Giacchino
- Vehicle type: Police Car
- Must transfer from wheelchair

Zootopia: Hot Pursuit (Chinese: 疯狂动物城：热力追踪; pinyin: Fēngkuáng dòngwù chéng: Rèlì zhuīzōng; lit. 'Wild Animal City: Hot Pursuit') is a trackless dark ride at Shanghai Disneyland. Based on the Zootopia franchise, it opened in December 2023 as the centerpiece of the park's Zootopia land. It is Disney's first trackless ride in Mainland China.

== Ride experience ==
As guests (or "newbies") enter the Zootopia Police Department, they get an alert about the city's former assistant mayor, Dawn Bellwether, and two of her hench-sheep, Woolter and Jesse, having escaped from prison and kidnapped famous pop star, Gazelle, before her latest concert at the Zootopia Day Festival as part of the former's plot for revenge against Zootopia for her previous defeat from the original film. After being informed by Chief Bogo, Bellwether suddenly hacks into the ZPD's system and taunts them over the kidnapped Gazelle. Bogo tells the guests to head for the loading station to go out and save the Zootopia Day Festival from disaster.

Once the guests enter the police car-themed ride vehicles, they arrive in Tundratown where officers Judy Hopps and Nick Wilde meet them. Judy informs them about the situation and she and Nick try to catch Bellwether and save Gazelle, but the escapees, spooked by their sudden appearance, flee from the scene of the crime with Gazelle in tow on snowmobiles. Judy, Nick, and the riders chase them on a snowmobile of their own through the area, running off Woolter in the process, before entering Sahara Square, nearly being hit by an oncoming freight train as the duo crashes their snowmobile off-screen. Riders enter the rest of Sahara Square where Duke Weaselton is trying to sell Gazelle-themed merchandise. After spotting a Gazelle impersonator, Judy and Nick, aided by the riders, catch Bellwether trying to lose them in the crowd while the riders take a detour through the Mystic Springs Oasis. They encounter the oasis' nude occupants before spotting the villainess escaping from the building. Next, riders enter the Rainforest District, where Judy and Nick catch sight of Bellwether and Jesse in one of the aerial tramway's cars and go after them while the riders head into one of them. Once onboard, Judy and Nick appear on the car's roof, where the latter ensures his allies that the car is safe to hold them in, only to inadvertently kick a bolt loose as the car hangs by a thread. Their predicament worsens when Bellwether appears and kicks the duo off the car's roof as Gazelle watches in horror from the other car while doing the same to Jesse. Bellwether then disconnects the car from its mechanism wheels, sending it and the riders nearly plummeting towards certain death. While in mid-fall, Judy and Nick apprehend Jesse before getting themselves tangled up in vines. Riders then encounter Flash Slothmore in his car as they drive off to Savanna Central where the Zootopia Day Festival is held. There, Bellwether tries to lose the ZPD in a sidecar-fitted moped, only to be intercepted by them. A police helicopter with Judy and Nick holding onto a ladder hanging from it arrives on the scene as they rescue Gazelle. Refusing to give up, Bellwether sets off after them, scattering attendees left and right before crashing her moped into an ice cream cone which an elephant attendee had dropped in the chaos, catapulting the villainess through the air before getting herself stuck in the sign of a Big Donut catering truck, ending her threat to the festival once and for all as she is then seized by the nearby Benjamin Clawhauser. The ride ends with Gazelle performing "Try Everything" at the festival and Judy and Nick congratulating the riders for their help.

== Music ==
Academy award-winning composer, Michael Giacchino composed the music for this attraction based on the scores by him, using a sixty-five-piece orchestra to synchronize some of the scenes from the Walt Disney Animation Studios film including a quartet of classical sections like strings, woodwinds, percussion and brass as well as a quartet of rhythm sections such as guitar, bass, drums and keyboards.

== Incident ==
Soon after the ride opened, an incident occurred in which a child exited the ride and was dragged underneath.

== Reception ==
The ride was nominated in the category of Outstanding Visual Effects in a Special Venue Project at the 22nd Visual Effects Society Awards.
