= Leave Me Alone (Reneé Rapp song) =

2025 single by Reneé Rapp

Single by Reneé Rapp

from the album Bite Me
- Released: May 21, 2025
- Genre: Pop rock
- Length: 2:21
- Label: Interscope
- Songwriters: Alexander Glantz; Julian Bunetta; Omer Fedi; Reneé Rapp; Steph Jones
- Producers: Omer Fedi; Julian Bunetta; Alexander 23

Reneé Rapp singles chronology
"Tummy Hurts" (2024)	"Leave Me Alone" (2025)	"Mad" (2025)

Music video
- "Leave Me Alone" on YouTube

"Leave Me Alone" is a song by American singer Reneé Rapp. It was released on May 21, 2025 as the lead single from her second studio album, Bite Me (2025). The song introduces a shift from the cinematic ballad style of her debut album, Snow Angel (2023), incorporating funky, club-inspired production and a more playful, bold lyrical tone. Drawing on elements of early 2010s and 2000s pop, it reflects a different facet of Rapp's musical identity. The release followed a teaser campaign and signals the beginning of a new era in her artistic direction.

== Background ==
Following the release of the Mean Girls musical film soundtrack, Reneé Rapp began teasing new solo material on social media, including a snippet of her upcoming single with the lyric "I'm a real bad girl / But a real good kisser." Alongside promotional posters and merchandise, she hinted at the title of her forthcoming second studio album, Bite Me, generating anticipation among fans. Earlier in the month, a teaser campaign was launched featuring the debut of the Bite.me website and social media promotions from public figures such as Paris Hilton, Charlize Theron, and Monica Lewinsky. "Leave Me Alone" marks Rapp's first release since her collaboration with Megan Thee Stallion on "Not My Fault", featured on the Mean Girls soundtrack. The two artists also performed the track together on Saturday Night Live.

After first appearing as Leighton in The Sex Lives of College Girls (2021), she exited the show during its third season, which aired in 2024. In a February 2024 interview with The Hollywood Reporter, Rapp described the experience as emotionally challenging, noting the parallels between her character's journey and her own process of coming to terms with her sexuality. She stated, "That [show] was the most parallel experience in my life," recalling filming a pivotal coming-out scene that she described as deeply personal. Rapp's character departed the series in season three to transfer to MIT, and the show was officially canceled after that season. Rapp would reference her exit and the show's subsequent cancellation in "Leave Me Alone".

== Promotion ==
During a performance at the American Music Awards of 2025, which was held at the Fontainebleau Las Vegas, she was introduced by Jake Shane and began her set in front of a makeshift bathroom mirror with three dancers. After singing the line "I'm a real bad girl but a real good kisser," she broke out of the set and was joined by seven dancers, performing "Leave Me Alone" in a corseted top and gold belts. At one point, she lay down as a bird's-eye camera captured her while she sang revised lyrics, including "My ex walked in and my other ex with her... Leave me alone, babe, I wanna have fun." She later joined her backing band, who wore white T-shirts with the phrase "I Would Die for Reneé Rapp" printed in all caps.

== Composition ==
"Leave Me Alone" incorporates funky, club-influenced production and presents a sound that differs from the cinematic balladry of Snow Angel. The track features layered vocals, echo effects, and spontaneous background elements that contribute to a lively, late-night atmosphere. Lyrically, it combines humor and assertiveness, with references to early 2010s pop sensibilities. The song highlights a more playful and energetic aspect of Rapp's artistry while maintaining her established vocal presence. Described as a provocative and rebellious pop track, it begins with the line, "I'm a real bad girl but a real good kisser / Leave me alone, bitch, I wanna have fun," offering a glimpse into the more playful and uninhibited tone of her new musical chapter. Teen Vogue described the track as a brash, fun pop hit, evoking early 2000s nostalgia reminiscent of P!nk's M!ssundaztood, with elements also likened to the style of Olivia Rodrigo. The song's title verse contains an interpolation of "Day-O (The Banana Boat Song)" by Harry Balafonte.

== Charts ==
Chart performance for "Leave Me Alone"
Chart (2025)	Peak position
Estonia Airplay (TopHit)	70
Ireland (IRMA)	84
New Zealand Hot Singles (RMNZ)	8
UK Singles (Official Charts)	69
US Bubbling Under Hot 100 (Billboard)	20
