= Bite Me Tour (Reneé Rapp) =

2025–2026 concert tour by Reneé Rapp

- Tour by Reneé Rapp
- Promotional graphic
- Location: Australia; Europe; North America
- Associated album: Bite Me
- Start date: September 23, 2025
- End date: March 22, 2026
- No. of shows: 32
- Supporting acts: Absolutely; Cat & Calmell; Ravyn Lenae; Syd
- Producer: AO Live Presents; Live Nation
- Website: shop.reneerapp.com

Reneé Rapp concert chronology
- Snow Hard Feelings Tour (2023–2024); Bite Me Tour (2025–2026)

The Bite Me Tour was the third concert tour by the American singer Reneé Rapp, in support of her second studio album, Bite Me (2025). It commenced on September 23, 2025, in Morrison, United States, and concluded on March 22, 2026, in Dublin, Ireland. The tour featured 32 concerts, with Absolutely, Cat & Calmell, Ravyn Lenae, and Syd serving as supporting acts.

== Background ==
Reneé Rapp embarked on her Snow Hard Feelings Tour from 2023 to 2024 in support of her debut album, Snow Angel (2023). She began the promotional cycle for her 2025 studio album, Bite Me, with the release of its lead single, "Leave Me Alone", on May 21. Following her performance at Capital's Summertime Ball on June 15, 2025, Rapp began teasing a potential tour announcement with several posts on social media inspired by gossip magazines and tabloid journalism of the noughties. NME noted reference to Justin Timberlake's 2024 arrest when he stated: "this is going to ruin the tour".

On June 23, 2025, the tour was announced. Ravyn Lenae and Syd will serve as supporting acts. Artist pre-sale began on June 24, with general sale beginning three days later; cardholders of Gap Inc. and Mastercard were given pre-sale access. For the tour, Rapp also partnered with Save the Children and the non-profit environmental organization Reverb for the tour. On June 26, an additional concert in Brooklyn, New York, was announced. On July 25, European dates were announced, with Absolutely as supporting act. On August 8, a second concert in London and a new concert in Dublin were announced, respectively. On September 15, a concert in San Diego was announced.

That November, concerts in Australia were announced, including a concert as part of the Australian Open events, promoted by AO Live Presents. On January 15 2026, Cat & Calmell were announced as a supporting act for the concerts in Australia.

== Set list ==
This set list is from the concert in Morrison on September 23, 2025. It may not represent all concerts.

1. "Leave Me Alone"
2. "Kiss It Kiss It"
3. "Talk Too Much"
4. "Poison Poison"
5. "Colorado"
6. "Shy"
7. "Mad"
8. "Why Is She Still Here?"
9. "That's So Funny"
10. "Sometimes"
11. "Good Girl"
12. "Swim"
13. "I Think I Like You Better When You're Gone"
14. "I Can't Have You Around Me Anymore"
15. "Tummy Hurts"
16. "You'd Like That Wouldn't You"
17. "Pretty Girls"
18. "In the Kitchen"
19. "Snow Angel"
20. "Not My Fault"
21. "At Least I'm Hot"

=== Alterations ===
- During the October 2, 2025, concert in Boston, "Everything to Everyone" opened the show, and "I Hate Boston" was performed succeeding "That's So Funny" and proceeding "Sometimes".

== Tour dates ==
List of 2025 concerts
Date (2025)	City	Country	Venue	Supporting act(s)
September 23	Morrison	United States	Red Rocks Amphitheatre	Ravyn Lenae
September 25	Rosemont	United States	Allstate Arena	Ravyn Lenae
September 27	Sterling Heights	United States	Michigan Lottery Amphitheater	Syd
September 29	New York City	United States	Madison Square Garden	Syd
October 1	Brooklyn	United States	Barclays Center	Syd
October 2	Boston	United States	TD Garden	Syd
October 4 (Note: This concert was part of All Things Go Music Festival.)	Toronto	Canada	Budweiser Stage	—N/a
October 6	Columbia	United States	Merriweather Post Pavilion	Syd
October 8	Columbus	United States	Nationwide Arena	Syd
October 10	Minneapolis	United States	The Armory	Syd
October 13	Portland	United States	Theater of the Clouds	Syd
October 15	San Francisco	United States	Bill Graham Civic Auditorium	Syd
October 17	Inglewood	United States	Kia Forum	Syd
October 18	San Diego	United States	Cal Coast Credit Union Open Air Theatre	—N/a
October 22	Austin	United States	Moody Amphitheater	Ravyn Lenae
October 23	Irving	United States	The Pavilion at Toyota Music Factory	Ravyn Lenae
November 4 (Note: The November 4, 2025, concert in Tampa was originally scheduled for October 27, but was postponed due to illness.)	Tampa	United States	Yuengling Center	Ravyn Lenae
November 5 (Note: The November 5, 2025, concert in Atlanta was originally scheduled for October 26, but was postponed due to illness.)	Atlanta	United States	State Farm Arena	Ravyn Lenae
November 7 (Note: The November 7, 2025, concert in Charlotte was originally scheduled for October 29, but was postponed due to illness.)	Charlotte	United States	Spectrum Center	Ravyn Lenae

List of 2026 concerts
Date (2026)	City	Country	Venue	Supporting act(s)
January 27	Brisbane	Australia	Riverstage	Cat & Calmell
January 29	Sydney	Australia	Hordern Pavilion	Cat & Calmell
January 30	Sydney	Australia	Hordern Pavilion	Cat & Calmell
January 31 (Note: The January 31, 2026, concert is promoted by the AO Live Presents series, and is part of the Australian Open weekend event.)	Melbourne	Australia	John Cain Arena	Cat & Calmell
March 11	Antwerp	Belgium	Lotto Arena	Absolutely
March 12	Amsterdam	Netherlands	AFAS Live	Absolutely
March 13	Berlin	Germany	Uber Eats Music Hall	Absolutely
March 15	Cologne	Germany	Palladium	Absolutely
March 16	Paris	France	Zénith La Villette	Absolutely
March 18	Manchester	England	AO Arena	Absolutely
March 19	London	England	OVO Arena Wembley	Absolutely
March 20	London	England	OVO Arena Wembley	Absolutely
March 22	Dublin	Ireland	3Arena	Absolutely
