= Bite Me (album) =

2025 studio album by Reneé Rapp

- Standard cover (Note: Several artwork variants were made available on Rapp's official store in various different formats.)

Studio album by Reneé Rapp
- Released: August 1, 2025
- Studios: Julian Bunetta's studio (Nashville); Ryan Tedder's studio (West Hollywood)
- Genre: Pop
- Length: 33:22
- Label: Interscope
- Producers: Alexander 23; Bunetta; Omer Fedi; Emile Haynie; Henry Kwapis; Carter Lang; Vaughn Oliver; Solomonophonic; Tedder

Reneé Rapp chronology
Snow Angel (2023)	Bite Me (2025)

Singles from Bite Me
- 1. "Leave Me Alone" Released: May 21, 2025; 2. "Mad" Released: June 27, 2025; 3. "Why Is She Still Here?" Released: July 17, 2025

Bite Me is the second studio album by the American singer-songwriter Reneé Rapp. It was released on August 1, 2025, by Interscope Records. It follows her debut album, Snow Angel (2023), and it is supported by the release of singles "Leave Me Alone", "Mad", and "Why Is She Still Here?".

Commercially, the album has charted at number one in the Netherlands, Scotland, and the United Kingdom, and within the top ten in Australia, Austria, Belgium, Germany, New Zealand, and the United States. Upon release, Bite Me received positive reviews from critics, with several noting Rapp's use of sexuality in her music and its lyrical content, while others mentioned the album's lack of direction, finding it inconsistent. In support of the album, she embarked on the Bite Me Tour, which commenced on September 23, 2025.

== Background ==
In 2022, Reneé Rapp signed a recording contract with Interscope Records. Under the contract, she released the extended play Everything to Everyone (2022) and her debut album, Snow Angel (2023). In support of Snow Angel, Rapp embarked on a tour in the fall of 2023, with collaborator Alexander 23 and Towa Bird featuring as supporting acts. The following year, she starred in the musical adaptation of the 2004 film Mean Girls as Regina George. In response to her performance in the film, Rapp was hailed a "bona fide star".

== Concept and development ==
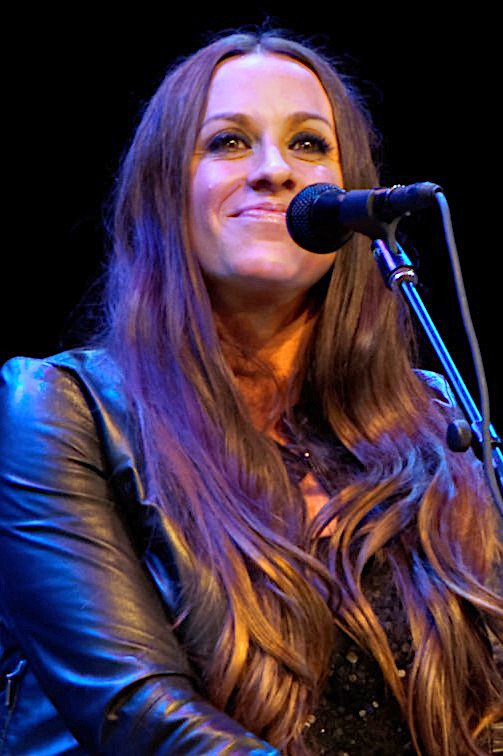
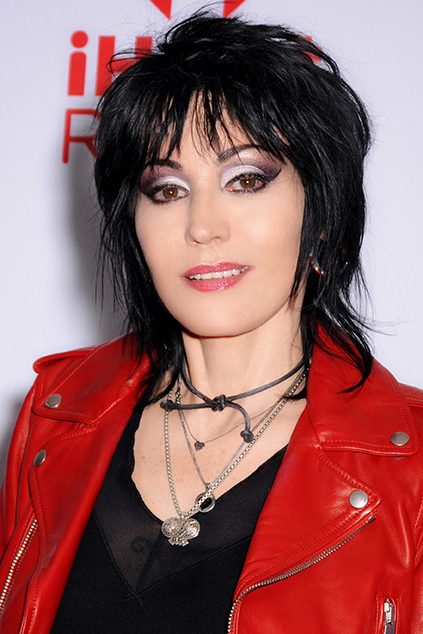
Rapp cited Jagged Little Pill (1995) by Alanis Morissette (left) and Joan Jett (right) as inspirations for Bite Me.

During an appearance on a July 2024 episode of the Instagram podcast Close Friends Only, Rapp disclosed she had been working on a follow-up to 2023's Snow Angel. She described the album as deeply personal and emotionally messy "in the best way".

In March 2025, while attending the Vanity Fair Oscars Party, when questioned about new music, Rapp joked "I quit, it's all over," while also teasing she had been listening to her own music as of late. Two months later, Rapp—with the help of Paris Hilton and Charlize Theron, among others—began teasing the album on social media before announcing the album's title and release date on May 21, 2025, alongside the release of the lead single, "Leave Me Alone".

In a feature interview with Paper, published on June 27, 2025, Rapp revealed she was proud of the album, stating: "This is exactly what I live and breathe. This is me at this point in my life, an album and a world that is really easy to step into." She also expressed that despite feeling "unbridled joy", she was also beginning to feel anxious and nervous in the lead-up to the album's release, revealing: "I hope it continues to feel fun." She further expressed her feelings of having a reckoning, which ultimately lead to her departure from The Sex Lives of College Girls and admitted to being done with the promotion of Snow Angel; she expressed the need to "shed everything that is hurting me off of my body immediately." She further explained feeling burnt out following the release of her previous projects, telling Rolling Stone: "Taking a break was a train wreck because it was so hard to stop. I couldn't just pull out of every fucking show I had booked or festival. So it was a little bit difficult, but I think that ultimately it was really great for me." She further disclosed her excitement did not return until the final seven months of the album's recording process, and that she found trust within herself. Describing the album herself, Rapp stated: "I think that the whole energy of Bite Me is respectfully get the fuck outta my face." This mentality lent itself into Rapp beginning to like her personal life over her professional life, which made her more comfortable in taking more time to curate the album.

In production for the album, Rapp reunited with frequent collaborator Alexander 23, and cited Alanis Morissette's Jagged Little Pill (1995) and Joan Jett as inspirations for Bite Me. She noted the latter's androgyny and in your face attitude, stating: "But her entire attitude was always a really strong blend of being a beautiful girl, but she's very masculine as well. She has this—no pun intended—bite to everything she writes about, and it's all very in-your-face." Ten days ahead of the album's release, she posted the track listing on her social media accounts. Speaking to the Associated Press, she revealed the album felt "just like a time capsule of those two years of my life, a lot having to do with the business and the industry and people's expectations of me." Rapp also disclosed her desire that those listening to the album feel the conflicting idea of impostor syndrome, which she experienced through her own success, and for them to know they were not alone in those feelings.

Discussing the album with Variety, Rapp remarked that "[e]verything inherently that I do is lesbianism." She further revealed that going into creating the album she "knew what I wanted. I wasn't making [this album] to impress anyone else. I made it to impress myself." She later echoed these sentiments, telling Vogue: "I definitely had that theme going into it. I knew the attitude and I knew the name of the album before it all started coming together."

== Composition ==
=== Music ===
Bite Me is primarily described as a pop music record. Several reviews also noted the influences of 1980s synths and alt-rock, as well as the punk music and Contemporary R&B of the early 2000s, the latter of which many praised, while others referred to it as "bland" and "pastiche". "At Least I'm Hot" leans into a 1970s disco sound, which was also explored on "Kiss It Kiss It". Contemporary R&B is explored in "I Think I Like You Better When You're Gone".

=== Lyrics and themes ===
The album deals with the "destabilizing emotions" of both the beginning and ending of relationships, which is further noted as " heartache followed by the rush of a new crush". In addition, Bite Me departs from the vulnerability of heartbreak on 2023's Snow Angel and embraces themes of a rebellious attitude. The concepts of quiet reflection, raw honesty, and chaos are also explored. Several reviews note the inclusion of same-sex relationships, including Rapp's own sexual identity; speculation amongst reviews claim the subject of the ending of her relationship with TikTok creator Alissa Carrington and her relationship with Bird; Rapp acknowledged her relationship with Bird, specifically with "At Least I'm Hot" (which the couple collaborated on), stating: "I love when artists give you a clue into their lives, and the people who make their lives full."

=== Songs ===
"Leave Me Alone" see's influence of Jett and 2010s pop sensibilities, while also having a "can't-be-bothered" and "fuck you" attitude. The lyrics speak of Rapp's feelings towards her label's desire for new music, her exit from The Sex Lives of College Girls, and the questioning from others of her own sexuality. "Mad" is described as "an impassioned plea for a lover to get over their bad attitude" while spending "more time in bed"; Samantha Olson of Cosmopolitan headlined the lyrics released the "frustration of fighting with your significant other". The album's third track, "Why Is She Still Here?", is described as a "sexy, jazz-tinged ballad", featuring bass guitar, synths, and percussion. Lyrically, the song is about relationship complications as Rapp is haunted with heartbreak by her lover's ex; reviews described the song as "scathing" and "unfiltered". With "At Least I'm Hot", Rapp describes the song as "funny", while on "That's So Funny", she sings about the ending of a friendship, that is described as both toxic and "deeply affecting".

"Sometimes" serves as a break-up ballad, detailing the process of loving someone who has already moved on. On "Kiss It Kiss It", Rapp showcases a more flirtatious side, with comparison to Garbage's 1996 alternative and electronic rock hit, "Stupid Girl", while in "Good Girl" she sings about struggling to deal with feelings towards a woman who challenges her act as a responsible adult and throwing caution to the wind. The album's closer, "You'd Like That Wouldn't You" touches upon the idea of how easy it would be to get back together with her ex, but the thought of such concept being fully realized makes her want to die.

== Promotion ==
The lead single, "Leave Me Alone", was released on May 21, 2025, alongside its music video. In response to the song's release, Them warned for a "(Reneé) Rapp summer". The New York Times listed the song at number two on their list of "8 Rising Pop Girls You Should Hear Now". She performed the song at the American Music Awards of 2025 on May 26. Rapp performed at Capital's Summertime Ball on June 15, 2025, at Wembley Stadium.

Rapp performed on Today as part of their Citi Concert Series on June 27, 2025. The same day, "Mad" was released as the album's second single, alongside its music video, which featured actress Alexandra Shipp as Rapp's love interest. Uproxx described the video as hedonistic. "Why Is She Still Here?" was released as the album's third single on July 18, 2025. A visualizer was released simultaneously alongside the song's release. "I Think I Like You Better When You're Gone" was released as a promotional single on July 31, 2025, and in 2026 was released on a 7-inch vinyl featuring an exclusive a cappella rendition of the song.

In the lead-up to the album's release, Complex Networks opened a pop-up shop in New York City, United States. The event, which took place from July 31 to August 1, 2025, featured merchandise in relation to Bite Me, as well as pop-up exclusive content including a special-edition color vinyl and G.A.S. trading cards. On July 31, Rapp performed "Shy" on The Late Show with Stephen Colbert. In support of the album's release, Rapp embarked on the Bite Me Tour, from September 2025 to March 2026. Absolutely, Ravyn Lenae and Syd served as supporting acts.

== Critical reception ==
Professional ratings
Aggregate scores
Source	Rating
AnyDecentMusic?	7.1/10
Metacritic	79/100
Review scores
Source	Rating
AllMusic	4/5 stars
The Arts Desk	3/5 stars
Clash	7/10
Dork	5/5
Financial Times	3/5 stars
The Independent	4/5 stars
The Irish Times	3/5 stars
London Standard	3/5 stars
Pitchfork	6.4/10
Rolling Stone	4.5/5 stars

Initial reviews of Bite Me were generally mixed. According to the review aggregator Metacritic, Bite Me received "generally favorable reviews" based on a weighted average score of 79 out of 100 from seven critic scores. AnyDecentMusic? gave the album a score of 7.2 out of 10 based on ten reviews.

Positive reviews generally complimented Rapp on the themes of Bite Me. AllMusic noted the album found her "embracing her sexuality and independence", while also noting the "wry pop charisma" displayed throughout. In their review, Dork hailed the album as "a lesson in unflinching pop excellence", while noting that unlike Snow Angel (2023), Bite Me "leans into the chaos a bit more". For Rolling Stone, Rob Sheffield heralded the changes Rapp made from Snow Angel to Bite Me, referring to the album as "one of the year’s most delightful pop blowouts", noting its nod to sex and drugs and rock and roll. Clash noted the music's "vulnerability with defiance in a pop statement steeped in Broadway-born confidence, emotional candour, and the biting wit that sets her apart in an already crowded field" against singers like Sabrina Carpenter, Billie Eilish, Chappell Roan, and Olivia Rodrigo.

The Independent, Spectrum Culture, and The Times gave the album four out of five stars; Helen Brown of The Independent noted Rapp's "defiant spirit" and "the giddy relish she throws into her explicitly queer narratives." Spectrum Culture journalist Alyssa Rotunno noted the album had Rapp stepping further into her pop-star persona, stating: "Bite Me isn't interested in being clean-cut. It's too busy being honest." Rotunno furthered named "I Think I Like You Better When You're Gone" as the crown jewel of the album. Chief rock and pop critic Will Hodgkinson of The Times hailed Rapp as the "Joan Jett of modern pop" and noted complimented her for not politicizing her sexuality. The Line of Best Fit gave the album a seven out of ten rating, remarking Rapp was not "here to be polite". Pitchfork named it as one of the eight albums that should be listened during its release week. However, in their review, the website gave Bite Me a 6.4 out of ten rating, calling Rapp a "vocal powerhouse", but further noted that the album "tends to waste her talents on its most maudlin ballads."

Many reviews otherwise noted the lack of direction and intent from Rapp. In his review for Riff Magazine, Joshua Miller felt the album left him wanting more, and that it was "mostly bark, not bite". Thomas H Green of The Arts Desk, London Standard's India Block, Financial Times critic Ludovic Hunter-Tilney, and The Irish Times' Ed Power gave the album three out of five stars. Green complimented the album's lyrical content (describing them as "cheeky" and "more substantial than most femme-pop"), but did note filler. Block complimented Rapp for leaving the filter off with her music, but noted it was not a "perfect album". Hunter-Tilney felt that "at times confines itself to routine structures", while believing Rapp was too "anxious not to put a foot wrong". In his review, Power described the album as "so-so", while also noting how inconsistent the songs are. In their review, Paste made mention of the album's movement, believing it went "nowhere", and called out its "unfocused sound and loose vision".

=== Year-end lists ===
Year-end lists
Publication	List	Rank	Ref.
Rolling Stone	The 100 Best Albums of 2025	53	

== Commercial performance ==
Bite Me debuted at number three on the US Billboard 200 chart, marking Rapp's first top ten album. It opened with 64,000 album-equivalent units, of which 47,000 were sales and 17,000 were streaming-equivalent units (translated from 21.85 million on-demand streams). The album debuted at number one on the UK Albums Chart with 15,643 album-equivalent units, besting her previous peak of number seven with Snow Angel (2023). In Australia, Bite Me debuted at number three on the ARIA Top 50 Albums Chart, and reached the top ten in New Zealand.

== Track listing ==
Standard edition
No.	Title	Writer(s)	Producer(s)	Length
1.	"Leave Me Alone"	Reneé Rapp; Omer Fedi; Julian Bunetta; Alexander Glantz; Steph Jones	Fedi; Bunetta; Alexander 23	2:21
2.	"Mad"	Rapp; Fedi; Glantz; Ali Tamposi	Fedi; Carter Lang; Solomonophonic	2:54
3.	"Why Is She Still Here?"	Rapp; Fedi; Bunetta; Glantz; Tamposi	Fedi; Bunetta	2:30
4.	"Sometimes"	Rapp; Fedi; Ryan Tedder; Glantz; Tamposi	Fedi; Tedder; Alexander 23; Emile Haynie	3:03
5.	"Kiss It Kiss It"	Rapp; Fedi; Glantz; Tamposi	Fedi; Vaughn Oliver; Alexander 23	2:52
6.	"Good Girl"	Rapp; Fedi; Bunetta; Glantz; Tamposi	Fedi; Bunetta	3:12
7.	"I Can't Have You Around Me Anymore"	Rapp; Fedi; Lang; Caroline Ailin; Tamposi	Fedi; Lang	2:44
8.	"Shy"	Rapp; Fedi; Mikky Ekko; Tamposi; Glantz	Fedi; Alexander 23	3:12
9.	"At Least I'm Hot"	Rapp; Fedi; Towa Bird; Glantz; Tamposi; Victoria Ryann Zaro; Sarah Solovay; Ido Zmishlany	Fedi; Oliver	2:34
10.	"I Think I Like You Better When You're Gone"	Rapp; Fedi; Ekko; Glantz; Tamposi	Fedi; Henry Kwapis	2:23
11.	"That's So Funny"	Rapp; Glantz; Luka Kloser; Dan Nigro; Tamposi	Alexander 23	2:49
12.	"You'd Like That Wouldn't You"	Rapp; Fedi; Bunetta; Ekko; Glantz; Tamposi	Fedi; Bunetta	2:48
Total length:				33:22

Live version
No.	Title	Writer(s)	Length
13.	"I Think I Like You Better When You're Gone" (live)	Rapp; Fedi; Ekko; Glantz; Tamposi	2:31
14.	"Kiss It Kiss It" (live)	Rapp; Fedi; Glantz; Tamposi	3:01
15.	"Mad" (live)	Rapp; Fedi; Glantz; Tamposi	3:13
16.	"At Least I'm Hot" (live)	Rapp; Fedi; Bird; Glantz; Tamposi; Zaro; Solovay; Zmishlany	2:47
17.	"Why Is She Still Here?" (live)	Rapp; Fedi; Bunetta; Glantz; Tamposi	2:41
Total length:			47:35

== Personnel ==
Credits adapted from the album's liner notes and Tidal.

=== Musicians ===
- Reneé Rapp – lead vocals
- Omer Fedi – guitar (tracks 1–10, 12); programming, bass (1–6, 8–10, 12); synthesizer (1–3), drums (1, 4, 6, 9, 10), Mellotron (2), keyboards (4–6, 8–10, 12)
- Julian Bunetta – programming, drums (1, 3, 6, 12); bass, guitar (1, 6, 12); synthesizer (1), background vocals (2), keyboards (6, 8, 12)
- Alexander 23 – guitar (2, 5, 8, 11), background vocals (2), drums (4, 8); programming, keyboards (4); bass (8, 11), other instruments (11)
- Carter Lang – drums, synthesizer (2); bass (7)
- Andrew Synowiec – guitar (2)
- Solomonophonic – guitar (2)
- Mor Uzan – guitar (2)
- Emile Haynie – programming, drums, keyboards (4)
- Ryan Tedder – programming, drums, keyboards (4)
- Vaughn Oliver – programming, drums, bass, keyboards (5, 9)
- Asher Fedi – drums (5, 8)
- Paul Cornish – keyboards, synthesizer (5)
- Towa Bird – lead vocals (9)
- Henry Kwapis – programming, drums, bass, guitar, keyboards (10)
- Travis Barker – drums (12)

=== Technical ===
- Julian Bunetta – recording (1, 3, 6, 12)
- Omer Fedi – recording (2, 3, 5–10, 12)
- Ryan Tedder – recording (4)
- Vaughn Oliver – recording (9)
- Serban Ghenea – mixing (1–3, 5, 6, 8, 9, 12)
- Jon Castelli – mixing (4, 7, 10)
- Mitch McCarthy – mixing (11)
- Bryce Bordone – mixing assistance (1–3, 5, 6, 8, 9, 12)
- Brad Lauchert – engineering for mix (4, 7, 10)
- Nathan Dantzler – mastering
- Harrison Tate – mastering assistance
- Jacob Bixenman – creative direction
- Zora Sicher – photography
- Aly Cooper – styling
- Kate Li – styling associate
- Marissa Marino – hair
- Loren Canby – make up
- Anna Wesolowska – nails
- Wyatt Knowles – design

== Charts ==
=== Weekly charts ===
Weekly chart performance
Chart (2025)	Peak position
Australian Albums (ARIA)	3
Austrian Albums (Ö3 Austria)	3
Belgian Albums (Ultratop Flanders)	2
Belgian Albums (Ultratop Wallonia)	7
Canadian Albums (Billboard)	14
Dutch Albums (Album Top 100)	1
French Albums (SNEP)	40
German Albums (Offizielle Top 100)	4
Irish Albums (Official Charts)	13
New Zealand Albums (RMNZ)	7
Norwegian Albums (IFPI Norge)	69
Polish Albums (ZPAV)	71
Portuguese Albums (AFP)	21
Scottish Albums (Official Charts)	1
Spanish Albums (PROMUSICAE)	34
Swiss Albums (Schweizer Hitparade)	12
UK Albums (Official Charts)	1
US Billboard 200	3

=== Year-end charts ===
Year-end chart performance
Chart (2025)	Position
Belgian Albums (Ultratop Flanders)	198

== Certifications ==
Certifications
Region	Certification	Certified units/sales
United Kingdom (BPI)	Silver	60,000^{‡}
^{‡} Sales+streaming figures based on certification alone.

== Release history ==
Release history
Date	Format	Edition	Label	Ref.
August 1, 2025	CD; music download; LP; streaming	Standard	Interscope	
August 4, 2025	Music download; streaming	Live version	Interscope	
