= Queen bee syndrome =

Social phenomenon

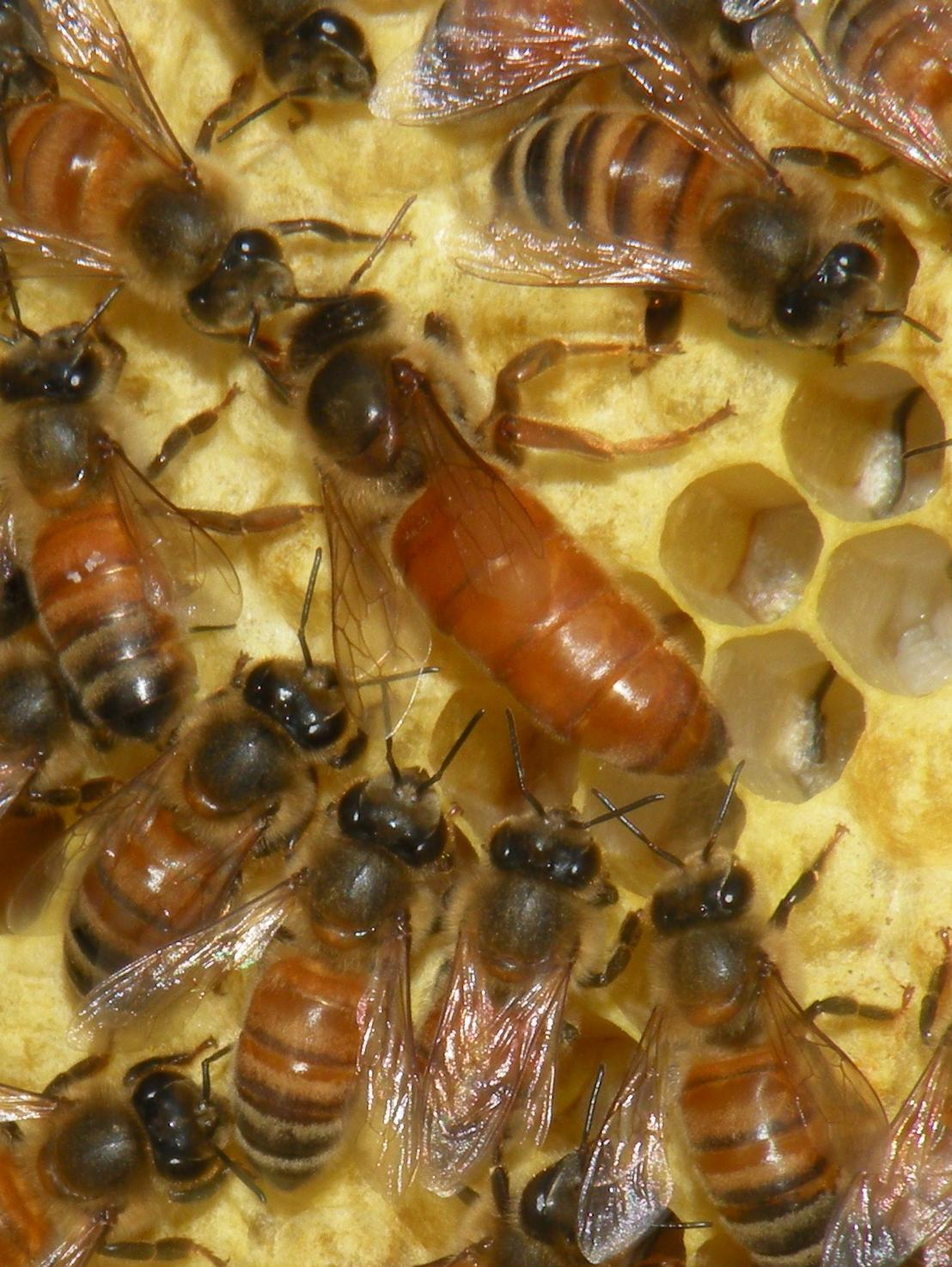
Apis mellifera - queen and worker bees

Queen bee syndrome is a social phenomenon where women in positions of authority or power treat subordinate females worse than males, purely based on gender. It was first defined by three researchers: Graham Staines, Carol Tavris, and Toby E. Jayaratne in 1973.

The term "queen bee" is often used derogatorily and is applied to women who have achieved success in traditionally male-dominated fields. These women often take on "masculine" traits and distance themselves from other women in the workplace in order to succeed. They may also view or treat subordinates more critically if they are female, and refuse to help other women rise up the ranks as a form of self-preservation.

There are competing arguments as to whether or not queen bee syndrome is simply a myth. Some believe the term "queen bee" perpetuates outdated gender stereotypes, especially since there is currently no male-equivalent term. Tavris herself has expressed regret over coining such "a catchy name" for "such a complex pattern of behavior". She explains that the term has been misinterpreted, providing a false understanding of female dynamics in the workplace.

The queen bee phenomenon has been documented by several studies. Scientists from the University of Toronto speculated that queen bee syndrome may be the reason that women find it more stressful to work for female managers; no difference was found in stress levels for male workers.

It has been considered that part of the reason "queen bee" behavior has been unaddressed for so long is because contrary to men, when women in senior professional positions make judgements about their female subordinates, often no one will think to question whether or not it constitutes a form of gender discrimination.

== Origin ==
=== Gender stereotypes ===
Queen bee syndrome could be partially attributed to long-standing societal gender stereotypes wherein women are perceived to be lacking traditional leadership and achievement-oriented qualities (i.e., assertiveness, decisiveness) — often seen as synonymous with masculinity. This brings upon pressure for professional women to adopt these qualities, especially in work environments where men are the majority. With few top spots available to women "queen bees" feel they need to protect their place by exhibiting "masculine" traits as a form of self-group distancing. According to Naomi Ellemers et al., "survival of women in male-dominated work environment entails a form of individual mobility, in the sense that they have to prove to themselves and others that they are unlike other women in order to be successful". (Compare the "not like other girls syndrome", a type of respectability politics.) In a 1976 study by Ruble & Higgins, their research suggested that when women are in the minority of a group, which in high-level professional sectors is often the case, they described themselves in more "masculine" terms.

In childhood, boys are socialized to be leaders and decision-makers, but girls are warned that if they're too "bossy", they won't be liked. In an experiment by Joyce Benenson, she discovered that among five-year-old children in a competitive scenario, the dominant boy was revered by the other boys, however the dominant girl was disliked by the other girls. Coming into adolescence and adulthood, moving into leadership positions may pose a challenge for women who haven't been afforded the same opportunities to lead as their male counterparts.

In 1994, V. O'Leary and M. M. Ryan argued that high-achieving women might be perceived as "queen bees" due to the fact that their female employees struggle to see them as the boss; seeing their women bosses as women and their men bosses as bosses. They suggested that perhaps female employees held their female bosses to a double standard, expecting them to be more understanding, nurturing, and forgiving (traditional "feminine" traits) than male bosses.

=== Female solidarity or sisterhood ===
According to Judy Wacjman, "...women's presence in the world of men is conditional on them being willing to modify their behavior to become more like men or to be perceived as more male than men". High-achieving women don't have a lot of options; in modifying their behavior to be more conducive to leadership, they alienate themselves from other women and are seen as traitors, yet by sticking with the unspoken sisterhood, they struggle to gain traction professionally. When ambitious women choose to do what it takes to advance their careers, they often get labelled the "queen bee" due to the skewed perceptions of women in positions of power and leadership.

== In the workplace ==
Recent research has postulated that queen bee syndrome may be a product of cultural influences, especially those related to the modern workplace. One study done in the Netherlands found that women who displayed the most "queen bee" tendencies were the same women who experienced the highest levels of gender-based discrimination earlier on in their careers. Naomi Ellemers posited that the queen bee phenomenon is a consequence of gender-based discrimination inflicted on women trying to get ahead in their careers. "Queen bee" women, aware of their sacrifices made in order to become successful, see other up-and-coming women and believe they should be able to figure out how to achieve success without assistance or a whole movement, just as they did. These tendencies of women themselves subsequently maintain the barriers sustained by occupational sexism to shut them out. However, when it comes to women of similar seniority, "queen bees" are supportive, believing these women have also worked hard for their success.

It appears that the social dynamics of unbalanced work environments bring about the most discrimination. In a 1982 study by Gutek & Morasch, they found that in both female and male-dominated workplaces, women experienced higher levels of gender-based discrimination and sexual harassment as opposed to a workplace with roughly equal numbers of men and women.

Researchers have hypothesized that queen bee behavior may be developed by women who have achieved senior positions in their respective fields as a way to defend themselves against the gender bias experienced in the workplace. Distancing themselves from female subordinates attempting to advance in their own careers allows "queen bees" to connect with their male colleagues while demonstrating stereotypically masculine qualities such as assertiveness or leadership, which are attributed to success. By exhibiting these "masculine" traits, "queen bees" further legitimize their right to be in important professional positions as well as attaining job security by showing commitment to their careers.

Research has shown that women exhibiting queen bee qualities are less likely to hire the woman when choosing between a highly qualified male candidate and an equally qualified female candidate due to 'competition threat'. With a highly qualified female candidate, the "queen bee" might feel threatened. When asked to choose between a moderately qualified male candidate and an equally qualified female candidate, "queen bees" were again less likely to hire the female candidate, this time due to 'collective threat'. In this case, the "queen bee" might worry the female candidate would reflect negatively on her, as women in male-dominated workplaces are often grouped together by social categorization.

=== Social categorization ===
Social categorization, or self-categorization theory, is a psychological theory closely related to the processes of social perception wherein a person groups themselves and others into categories based on shared characteristics. This theory is thought to be ingrained since infancy and affects the way people perceive others — as part of a broader social grouping rather than as individuals. By way of social categorization, a subconscious process for the most part, individuals are assigned pre-designated traits as part of their larger group or category. For women in the workplace, social categorization works to their disadvantage as they are assigned stereotypically feminine traits such as being agreeable, helpful, sympathetic, and kind — and therefore perceived as less capable in leadership roles. When high-achieving women present themselves as anything less than those designated traits, they are often labeled as "bitches" or more specifically, "queen bees". Men are seen as great leaders for being ambitious and assertive, whereas women are often viewed as "unfeminine", "bossy" or "bitchy" for exhibiting those same traits.

=== In-group bias ===
In the professional sector, an in-group is a (typically exclusive) network of people from any given workplace who participate in informal get-togethers or events outside of work. It is at these informal get-togethers where colleagues get to know one another on a personal level and industry knowledge or workplace gossip is often shared. Beyond that, being a part of an in-group can lead to career advantages down the road. More often than not, it seems women and people of colour are scarcely included in these exclusive groups due to affinity bias — the tendency to favour those similar to us — exhibited by their male superiors. In social psychology, there is another term, similarity attraction, which may contribute to why high-level male executives tend to promote men over equally-qualified women. With fewer spots left at the top for women and a harder climb to get there, queen bee syndrome remains as a fighting-mechanism for ambitious women.

== In academia ==
In a 2004 study done in Italy, it was found that the older generation of female faculty viewed their female doctoral students in a stereotypical manner and made biased judgements about their commitment. The older female faculty began to pursue their careers when it was much rarer for women to do so, and view themselves as more "masculine" as a result. In contrast, the younger generation of Italian women are pursuing their careers at a time where it is much more common and widely accepted, meaning these women have less reason to suppress their "feminine" traits or perform self-group distancing. This resistance of gender stereotyping is a freeing evolution for both men and women in academia.

== Emotion politics ==
Emotion politics are at play in the maintenance of the queen bee phenomenon, altering how women treat other women as well as how they carry themselves in traditionally male-dominated arenas. It has been proven that when demonstrating the same level of competence that is commended in men, women are seen as unattractive and cold. When it comes to certain qualities and emotions, men and women are forcibly segregated into specific boxes and viewed as opposing, rather than harmonious forces. In the workplace and in academia notably, when women blur the lines between the two forces, for example, showing extreme competence or success in the professional sphere, they become the target for derogatory terms such as "queen bee", "ice queen", and "bitch". It appears that when women prove themselves in a traditionally-male role, they are punished for altering the favourable image of a woman.

Gender discrimination can arise through the beliefs concerning which emotions are appropriate for people to show. Stereotypically, women are expected to be kind and nurturing, communal, and modest, while they are not expected to display anger. Expressing an emotion that doesn't line up with people's beliefs about gender-appropriate behavior can lead to being given a lower status at work, and consequently, a lower wage.

=== Anger ===
A 2008 study found that men who expressed anger in the workplace were given a higher status, while women who expressed anger in the workplace were given a lower status, regardless of their actual position in the company. A trainee and a CEO who were female were both given a low status when displaying anger. Additionally, women who displayed anger in the workplace were assumed to have something internal influencing their anger, as opposed to having an external reason to be angry. Men more often had their anger attributed to an external cause.

The expression of anger is believed to be related to status, as anger is considered a status emotion. Positive impressions of those who display anger are reserved for people who are stereotypically conferred a higher status. A 2007 study found that female employees in a subordinate position displayed anger toward higher status employees much less frequently than their male counterparts. This suggests that the stereotypical norm of men displaying anger carries over into the workplace, while the norm of women restraining displays of anger also carries over. It also suggests that, although men in low level positions in the workplace possess a low status in this context, they may carry over the higher status that comes with their gender. Women do not possess this high status; therefore the low status that low-level women possess in the workplace is the sole status that matters.

=== Competition ===
The queen bee phenomenon still has no male-equivalent term, perhaps because male competition is seen as normal, healthy behavior, and as children it's even encouraged. Female competition however, is looked down upon — from childhood onward, women in competition are labeled as backstabbing, conniving, catty "mean girls". There are countless books and movies portraying the concept that it has started to become the standard. Despite the prevalence of material depicting queen bee behavior among women, studies have shown that men actually participate in similar to elevated levels of indirect aggression linked to queen bee behavior (i.e., gossiping, rumour spreading, social exclusion) in comparison to women. Admittedly, young boys tend to display physical aggression more than young girls at any age, but a 1992 study demonstrated that as boys reach the age of 11, verbal and indirect aggression levels rise. Verbal and indirect aggression requires a degree of social intelligence and understanding of interpersonal relationships, skills that girls tend to develop earlier than boys (around the age of 8). A 2005 study in Britain asked university students to report how often they either experienced, or participated in forms of indirect aggression (specifically social exclusion, use of malicious humour, and guilt induction). The results presented no differences between the experiences of men and women based on these self-reported numbers.

== Criticisms of the theory ==
Research that uses a robust causal identification mechanism (i.e., regression discontinuity design), strongly contests the existence of the queen bee phenomenon. The results of this study suggest that previous research was biased — either by eliciting confirming cases (as is often done in qualitative research) or that observational data based on questionnaire measures was biased because of endogeneity issues.

Some find the queen bee phenomenon to be unknowingly perpetuating gender stereotypes that are sorely outdated. It is also argued that the term undermines women's professional progress and abilities, and tarnishes the reputation of groups of women in the professional sphere. Another criticism of the theory comes from the belief that it promotes a "blame the woman" narrative.

In her book, Lean In, chief operating officer of Facebook, Sheryl Sandberg deplored the syndrome, writing: "Often, without realizing it, women internalize disparaging cultural attitudes and then echo them back".

A study by Credit Suisse counters the evidence of the queen bee phenomenon. In examining 3,400 of the world's largest companies, it was revealed that female CEOs were 50% more likely than their male counterparts to have a female CFO; and 55% more likely to have business units run by women. It was also discovered that while typically women are found within human resources or legal departments, in female-led companies it became less likely due to the fact that female CEOs were supporting their female executives branching out into more influential roles within the company.

== See also ==
- Feminism
- Sexism
- Occupational sexism
- Queen bee
- Queen bee (sociology)
- Toxic leader
- Narcissistic leadership
- Workplace bullying
