= Jōjima =

Jōjima (城島), also spelled Jojima or Johjima, may refer to:

- Jōjima, Fukuoka, Japan
- Kenji Johjima (城島 健司; born 1976), Japanese baseball player
- Koriki Jojima (城島 光力; born 1947), Japanese politician
- Takatsugu Jōjima (城島 高次; 1890–1967), Japanese navy admiral

== See also ==
- Joji (disambiguation)
