= Mean Girls (disambiguation) =

Mean Girls is a 2004 American film.

Mean Girls may also refer to:

- Mean Girls (2004 soundtrack), released by Warner Music/Rykodisc and Bulletproof Records
- Mean Girls 2, a 2011 sequel to the 2004 film, directed by Melanie Mayron
- Mean Girls (musical), 2017, based on the 2004 film, with lyrics by Nell Benjamin, and music by Jeff Richmond
- Mean Girls (2024 film), based on the musical, directed by Samantha Jayne and Arturo Perez Jr.
  - Mean Girls (2024 soundtrack), released by Universal Music/Interscope Records

== Songs ==
- "Mean Girls", a 2012 song by Rachel Crow from the EP Rachel Crow
- "Mean Girls", a 2024 song by Charli XCX from the album Brat
- "Mean Girls", a 2025 song by Katseye from the EP Beautiful Chaos

== See also ==
- Mean girl, the stereotype of a popular yet vindictive girl in high school
- "Mean Girl", a Status Quo song
- "Mean Girl", a 2026 song by the Filipino boy band BGYO, from the EP On Demand
