= Everything to Everyone =

Everything to Everyone may refer to:

- Everything to Everyone (album) by the Barenaked Ladies
- Everything to Everyone (EP) by Reneé Rapp
- "Everything to Everyone" (song), by Everclear
