= Reneé Rapp =

American singer and actress (born 2000)

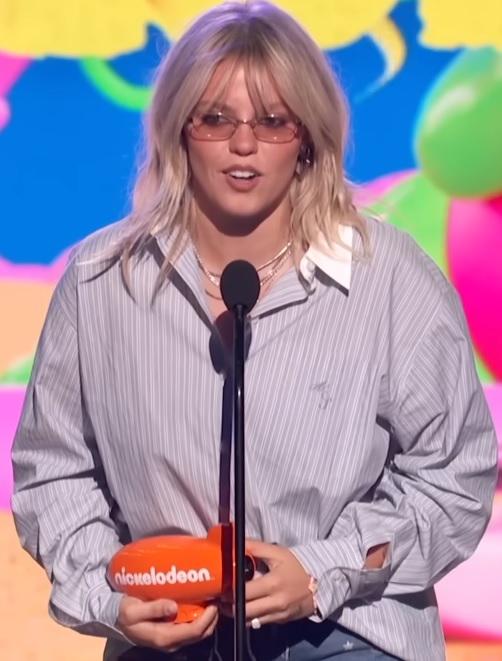
- Rapp at the 2024 Kids' Choice Awards

Background information
- Born: Reneé Jane Rapp; January 10, 2000 (age 26); Huntersville, North Carolina, U.S.
- Genres: Pop; pop rock; R&B
- Occupations: Singer; actress
- Years active: 2018–present
- Label: Interscope
- Website: reneerapp.com

Reneé Jane Rapp (born January 10, 2000) is an American singer and actress. She gained recognition for starring as Regina George in the Broadway musical Mean Girls (2019–2020). She reprised the role in the 2024 musical film adaptation and also contributed to its soundtrack. Rapp has also acted in the HBO Max comedy series The Sex Lives of College Girls (2021–2024). She released her debut EP, Everything to Everyone, in 2022, which was followed by her full-length studio album, Snow Angel, in 2023. Rapp's second album, Bite Me, was released on August 1, 2025.

== Early life ==
Reneé Jane Rapp was born on January 10, 2000, in Huntersville, North Carolina, a suburb of Charlotte, to Denise Olexa, a Certified Public Accountant, and Charles Rapp, who worked in medical device sales. Olexa purposefully chose an alliterative name for her daughter "just in case" she would pursue a career in music. Rapp has a younger brother, Charles, who is also a performer and appeared on stage with her during her Snow Hard Feelings Tour in 2023.

Rapp attended Hopewell High School for two years, participating in the theater program there, before transferring to Northwest School of the Arts. Corey Mitchell, Rapp's theater teacher, said Rapp "has a special distinction...There is a difference when that vocal ability is coupled with sincere emotions that can move an audience and that literally can excite an audience".

As a high school senior, Rapp played Wendla in Spring Awakening at Theatre Charlotte and won Best Actress at the Blumey Awards, given to high school musical theater performers in the Charlotte area, for her portrayal of Sandra in her school's production of Big Fish. She then advanced to the national Jimmy Awards, held at Minskoff Theatre on Broadway, where she won Best Performance by an Actress, beating forty other competitors. This win earned her a $10,000 scholarship and attention from agents. Actress Laura Benanti, who presented the award to Rapp, said, "I will never be as confident as that 18-year-old".

== Career ==
=== 2018–2020: Mean Girls musical ===
Rapp planned to study musical theater at Texas State University, but deferred her first semester to live in New York City, staying at a friend's Parsons School of Design dorm room. She was approached by Tina Fey and Lorne Michaels about playing Regina George in a traveling version of Mean Girls, but turned it down, wanting to stay in the city. A few months later, Fey and Michaels offered her the role in the Broadway production of the show, replacing Taylor Louderman; Rapp agreed, provided Fey and Michaels would also support Rapp's music career.

Rapp starred as Regina for a limited run from June 7–26, 2019, then permanently starting September 10. The production closed after March 10, 2020, in accordance with Broadway's shutdown due to the COVID-19 pandemic. Rapp later spoke about how her eating disorder worsened during the show's running, describing it as "the greatest time in my life but I had also never been more ill." After the shutdown, she moved back into her parents' home and began teaching singing lessons over Zoom.

=== 2021–2023: Television and music ===
As the pandemic continued, Rapp's manager suggested that she audition for film and TV as those would be more likely to resume production first. Over the Internet, Rapp auditioned for Mindy Kaling's HBO Max teen comedy series The Sex Lives of College Girls and landed the role of Leighton Murray, one of the four main leads on the show. Rapp moved to Los Angeles in order to work on the series. In July 2023, it was reported that she would be leaving the show during the third season. Rapp said that this was due to wanting to pursue music full-time. The character Leighton was written out of the show by having her transfer to another college.

In October 2023, Rapp mentioned having no desire to return to acting after Mean Girls due to the anxiety the environment gave her, wanting to instead focus on a music career. She had previously said that working on the Broadway production of Mean Girls had exacerbated her eating disorder.

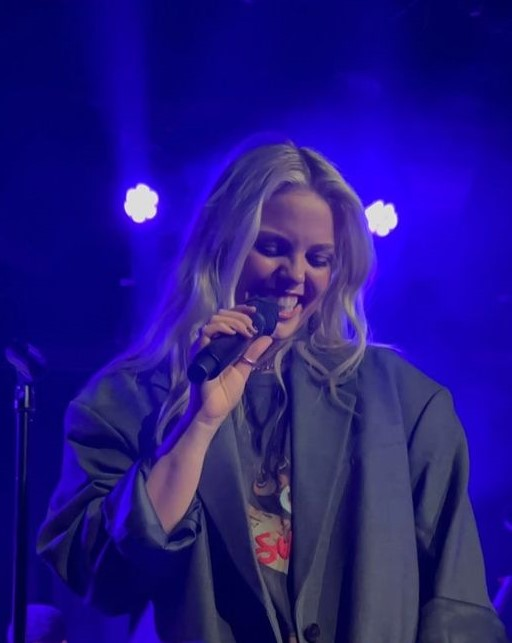
Rapp performing in December 2022

Rapp released her debut extended play (EP) Everything to Everyone on November 11, 2022. In February 2023, a deluxe version was released, featuring two new songs.

On November 14, 2022, Rapp announced her first tour, "Everything to Everyone: The First Shows". There were four tour dates across the United States, in Los Angeles, Manhattan, Boston, and Atlanta. Due to high ticket demand, a new date was added in Brooklyn as well as extra shows in Los Angeles and Manhattan, and upgraded venues in Manhattan and Atlanta. Rapp's sold-out US tour ran from December 6–18, 2022, with a total of 8 shows. On January 12, 2023, Rapp announced her first international performance of her debut EP. On January 19, 2023, she performed a three-time venue-upgraded sold-out show at the O2 Forum Kentish Town.

Rapp's debut studio album, Snow Angel, was released on August 18, 2023. On June 16, 2023, Rapp announced an international Snow Hard Feelings tour, supported by Alexander 23 and Towa Bird. On November 17, 2023, a deluxe version of Snow Angel was released, featuring four new songs, including a remix of "Tummy Hurts" with Coco Jones. The official video for the remix was released on November 17, 2023.

=== 2024–present: Breakout in film and other ventures ===
On December 9, 2022, it was announced that Rapp would reprise her role as Regina George in a musical film adaptation of Mean Girls. On January 12, 2024, the film was released in theaters nationwide. On March 5, 2024, the film became available to stream on Paramount+.

On January 20, 2024, Rapp performed "Snow Angel" and "Not My Fault" on Saturday Night Live, with the latter featuring Megan Thee Stallion.

On February 4, 2025, L'Oréal Paris announced Rapp as its newest global ambassador. Delphine Viguier-Hovasse, L'Oréal Paris Global Brand President, stated that she "was very touched, attending Reneé’s concert in Paris, to see how much the young people in the room were loving her, supporting her, believing in her honesty and kindness and feeling understood by her."

On May 21, 2025, Rapp announced her second studio album, Bite Me, and released the lead single "Leave Me Alone". On May 25, 2025, she performed the song at the American Music Awards.

In June 2025, Rapp served as one of WorldPride DC's grand marshals alongside Laverne Cox. Later that month, Rapp released a second promotional single from Bite Me, titled "Mad".

During a 2025 appearance on the Call Her Daddy podcast, Rapp addressed TikTok speculation about the infidelity implications in the closing track “You’d Like That Wouldn't You,” explaining that it was a misread "cheeky" line.

== Artistry and influences ==
Rapp's music has been classified as pop, R&B, and pop rock. She has cited Beyoncé as her greatest musical influence and "the reason that [she] knows how to sing". Rapp also looks up to Frank Ocean as a songwriting inspiration. Her other musical influences include Jazmine Sullivan, SZA, Kacey Musgraves, and Pink. Her second studio album Bite Me was inspired by Alanis Morissette's Jagged Little Pill and Joan Jett.

Rapp is a soprano.

== Personal life ==
Rapp came out as a lesbian in 2024. She had previously identified herself as bisexual in a 2022 interview. She has been diagnosed with attention deficit hyperactivity disorder (ADHD) and a mood disorder. She has been outspoken about her struggles with an eating disorder and her mental health.

From 2019 to 2021, Rapp was in a relationship with fellow Broadway actor Antonio Cipriano. From January to October 2023, she was in a relationship with TikTok personality Alissa Carrington. In March 2024, Rapp and British musician Towa Bird made their public debut as a couple on the red carpet at the Vanity Fair Oscar party.

Rapp has said that she was "never part of a religion growing up".

== Filmography ==
=== Film ===
Year	Title	Role	Ref.
2024	Mean Girls	Regina George	

=== Television ===
Year	Title	Role	Notes	Ref.
2021–2024	The Sex Lives of College Girls	Leighton Murray	Main role (season 1–2); recurring (season 3)	
2024	Saturday Night Live	Herself	Episode: "Jacob Elordi/Reneé Rapp"	
2025	Sesame Street	Herself	Season 55 Episode 1: Beachball Bop	
2026	Austin City Limits	Herself	Episode: "Reneé Rapp / Thee Sacred Souls"	
2027	The Morning Show	Samantha	Recurring (season 5)	

== Stage ==
Stage performances by Reneé Rapp
Year(s)	Production	Role	Theatre	Notes
2018	Spring Awakening	Wendla	Theatre Charlotte	
2018	Parade	Monteen	Roundabout Theatre Company	Workshop
2019–2020	Mean Girls	Regina George	August Wilson Theatre	Broadway replacement
2021	Sisgendered	Producer/Herself	Feinstein's/54 Below	One-night only concert

== Discography ==
=== Studio albums ===
List of studio albums, with selected chart positions and certifications
Title	Details	Peak chart positions					Certifications
Title	Details	US	AUS	GER	NZ	UK	Certifications
Snow Angel	Released: August 18, 2023; Label: Interscope; Formats: CD, LP, digital download, streaming	44	42	76	31	7	BPI: Silver
Bite Me	Released: August 1, 2025; Label: Interscope; Formats: CD, LP, digital download, streaming	3	3	4	7	1	BPI: Silver

=== Soundtrack albums ===
List of soundtrack albums, with selected details
Title	Details	Peak chart positions	
Title	Details	US	AUS
Mean Girls (Music from the Motion Picture) (by the cast of Mean Girls (2024)	Released: January 12, 2024; Label: Interscope; Formats: CD, LP, digital download, streaming	124	97

=== Extended plays ===
List of extended plays with details and chart position
Title	Details	Peak chart positions	
Title	Details	US Heat.	US Sales
Everything to Everyone	Released: November 11, 2022; Label: Interscope; Format: CD, LP, digital download, streaming	14	47

=== Singles ===
List of singles as lead artist, with selected chart positions and certifications, showing year released and album name
Title	Year	Peak chart positions						Certifications	Album
Title	Year	US Bub.	US Pop	CAN	IRE	NZ Hot	UK	Certifications	Album
"Tattoos"	2022	—	—	—	—	—	—		Non-album single
"In the Kitchen"	2022	—	—	—	—	—	—		Everything to Everyone
"Don't Tell My Mom"	2022	—	—	—	—	—	—		Everything to Everyone
"Too Well"	2023	—	32	—	—	17	—	ARIA: Gold; MC: Gold	Everything to Everyone
"Snow Angel"	2023	—	—	—	—	35	—		Snow Angel
"Talk Too Much"	2023	—	—	—	—	—	—		Snow Angel
"Pretty Girls"	2023	—	—	—	—	30	—		Snow Angel
"Not My Fault" (with Megan Thee Stallion)	2023	2	12	82	54	8	61	ARIA: Gold; MC: Gold	Mean Girls
"Tummy Hurts" (solo or remix featuring Coco Jones)	2024	—	—	—	—	—	—	ARIA: Gold; BPI: Silver	Snow Angel
"Leave Me Alone"	2025	20	—	—	84	8	69		Bite Me
"Mad"	2025	—	—	—	—	17	—		Bite Me
"Why Is She Still Here?"	2025	—	—	—	—	16	—		Bite Me
"I Think I Like You Better When You're Gone"	2025	—	—	—	—	—	84		Bite Me
"Lucky"(from Now You See Me: Now You Don't)	2025	—	—	—	—	—	—		Non-album single
"—" denotes a recording that did not chart or was not released in that territory.

=== Other charted songs ===
List of other charted songs, showing year released and album title
Title	Year	Peak chart positions	Album
Title	Year	NZ Hot	Album
"World Burn" (with the Mean Girls cast)	2024	34	Mean Girls
"Sometimes"	2025	14	Bite Me
"Kiss It Kiss It"	2025	13	Bite Me
"Good Girl"	2025	19	Bite Me
"Shy"	2025	11	Bite Me

== Tours ==
- Everything to Everyone: The First Shows (2022–2023)
- Snow Hard Feelings Tour (2023–2024)
- Bite Me Tour (2025–2026)

== Awards and nominations ==
Accolades for Reneé Rapp
Year	Award	Category	Nominated work	Result	Ref.
2018	BroadwayWorld Charlotte Awards	Best Actress in a Musical (local)	Spring Awakening	Nominated	
2018	Jimmy Award	Best Performance by an Actress	Big Fish	Won	
2023	GLAAD Media Awards	Outstanding Breakthrough Music Artist	Herself	Nominated	
2023	MTV Europe Music Awards	Best New	Herself	Nominated	
2023	MTV Europe Music Awards	Best Push	Herself	Nominated	
2023	MTV Video Music Awards	Best New Artist	Herself	Nominated	
2023	MTV Video Music Awards	PUSH Performance of the Year	"Colorado"	Nominated	
2024	GLAAD Media Awards	Outstanding Music Artist	Snow Angel	Won	
2024	iHeartRadio Music Awards	Favorite Debut Album	Snow Angel	Nominated	
2024	Nickelodeon Kids' Choice Awards	Favorite Villain	Mean Girls	Nominated	
2024	Nickelodeon Kids' Choice Awards	Favorite Breakout Artist	Herself	Won	
