= Puss & Poems =

Studio album by Jake Shane
- Released: November 22, 2024
- Genre: Comedy
- Length: 25:49
- Label: 10K Projects
- Producer: Alexander 23

Puss & Poems is the debut studio album and debut comedy album by influencer Jake Shane. It was released on November 22, 2024, by 10K Projects, and produced by Alexander 23. The album features Joe Jonas, Snooki, Tate McRae, and other stars alike.

== Background ==
On session 13 of Therapuss with Jake Shane, Alexander 23 and Jake Shane discussed Shane's dream of being a pop star. Shane shared some poems he wrote, while Alexander 23 had played guitar along to him singing. In this episode, they planned a release on Shane's birthday October 27; however, this did not happen due to scheduling conflicts because of him being on his Therapuss Live tour. From there, Shane recorded some parts of the album in the studio with Alexander 23.

== Promotion ==
Jake Shane went on Instagram live on August 3, 2024, to play a sneak peek of Sugarfish, and explained it was the result of a feud with a sushi restaurant, named Sugarfish.

On November 18, 2024, Jake Shane announced on his Instagram the album, along with the cover and track list. He also put several physical copies on his merch store. On November 22, 2024 the album was released at midnight local time.

== Track listing ==
All tracks are written by Jake Shane.

Puss & Poems track listing
No.	Title	Length
1.	"Intro" (featuring Tate McRae)	0:39
2.	"Sugarfish"	2:07
3.	"Things I Hate"	2:39
4.	"Denim on Denim Skit" (featuring Jack Schlossberg)	1:45
5.	"Denim on Denim"	2:31
6.	"Pharmacist Skit" (featuring Julia Mervis)	1:45
7.	"Pharmacist"	2:05
8.	"The Hangover Song" (featuring Snooki)	3:23
9.	"The Hangover Skit" (featuring Joe Jonas)	0:33
10.	"Postmates"	2:50
11.	"JetBlue Skit" (featuring Alexander 23)	1:17
12.	"JetBlue"	3:23
13.	"Therapuss Theme Song" (featuring Alexander 23)	0:52
Total length:		25:49
