= Mean Girls (2004 soundtrack) =

Soundtrack album by various artists

Mean Girls (Music from the Motion Picture)

Soundtrack album by various artists
- Released: September 21, 2004
- Length: 49:17
- Labels: Rykodisc; Bulletproof
- Producer: Ralph Sall

Singles from Mean Girls (Music from the Motion Picture)
- 1. "Dancing with Myself" Released: June 1, 2004

Mean Girls (Music from the Motion Picture) is the soundtrack to the 2004 film of the same name. It was released on September 21, 2004 through Rykodisc and Bulletproof Records and featured 14 tracks from artists Pink, Kelis, Samantha Ronson, Katy Rose, Peaches, The Donnas amongst others. The release coincided with the film's home media release.

== Track listing ==
| No. | Title | Writer(s) | Artist(s) | Length |
|---|---|---|---|---|
| 1. | "Dancing with Myself" (Generation X cover) | Billy Idol; Tony James | The Donnas | 3:29 |
| 2. | "God Is a DJ" | Alecia Moore; Billy Mann; Jonathan S. Davis | Pink | 3:46 |
| 3. | "Milkshake" | Pharrell Williams; Chad Hugo | Kelis | 3:05 |
| 4. | "Sorry (Don't Ask Me)" | All Too Much | All Too Much | 2:57 |
| 5. | "Built This Way" (Slow Remix) | Samantha Ronson; Dallas Austin | Samantha Ronson | 4:16 |
| 6. | "Rip Her to Shreds" (Blondie cover) | Debbie Harry; Chris Stein | Boomkat | 4:07 |
| 7. | "Overdrive" | Katy Rose; Kim Bullard | Katy Rose | 2:54 |
| 8. | "One Way or Another" | Debbie Harry; Nigel Harrison | Blondie | 3:28 |
| 9. | "Operate" | Peaches; Sticky Henderson | Peaches | 3:30 |
| 10. | "Misty Canyon" | Anjali Bhatia | Anjali Bhatia | 4:23 |
| 11. | "Mean Gurl" | Gabriel Rene | Gabriel Rene | 3:27 |
| 12. | "Hated" | Jeff Richmond | Nikki Cleary | 2:48 |
| 13. | "Psyche Rock" (Fatboy Slim Malpaso Mix) | Pierre Henry; Michel Colombier | Pierre Henry | 6:32 |
| 14. | "The Mathlete Rap" | Gabriel Rene (music); Tina Fey (lyrics) | Rajiv Surendra | 0:35 |
| Total length: | | | | 49:17 |

== Additional music ==
Songs heard in the film but not on the soundtrack includes:

- "Pass That Dutch" by Missy Elliott
- "Naughty Girl" by Beyoncé
- "Beautiful" by Christina Aguilera
- "Fire (Yes, Yes Y'all)" by Joe Budden featuring Busta Rhymes
- "At Seventeen" by Janis Ian
- "Halcyon + On + On" by Orbital
- "Put 'Em Up" by N.O.R.E featuring Pharrell Williams
- "Oh Yeah" / "Run" by Gabriel Rene
- "Love's Theme" by the Love Unlimited Orchestra
- "Jingle Bell Rock" by Bobby Helms

== Reception ==
Heather Phares of AllMusic wrote "the soundtrack to Mean Girls is nearly as sharp and knowing as the movie is. The bulk of the songs tie into the movie's mostly witty dissection of how high-school girls jockey for position in the social food chain, and the complex mix of admiration, emulation, and jealousy in their friendships." Bradley Stern of MuuMuse described it as a "solid" and "nostalgic" listen, and called it as a "pretty spot-on time capsule of the teenage angst, feisty self-empowerment and fumbling sexual awkwardness that defined early ’00’s high school culture at its best". Sloan Wyatt of AfterglowX summarised "each one makes a unique contribution to a soundtrack that reflects the relentless teenage drama and angst that defined high school, perfect for a nostalgic celebration. Each song fits together to create a memorable and fitting musical compliment to an iconic movie." Cindy White of IGN wrote "completely effective for a lighthearted comedy".

== See also ==
- Mean Girls (2024 soundtrack)
