= Snow Angel (Reneé Rapp album) =

Studio album by Reneé Rapp
- Released: August 18, 2023
- Recorded: January–June 2023
- Length: 36:34
- Label: Interscope
- Producers: Alexander 23; Jon Bellion; Petro AP; Isabella Sjöstrand; Some Randoms; TenRoc; Pop Wansel

Reneé Rapp chronology
Everything to Everyone (2022)	Snow Angel (2023)	Bite Me (2025)

Singles from Snow Angel
- 1. "Snow Angel" Released: June 9, 2023; 2. "Talk Too Much" Released: July 12, 2023; 3. "Pretty Girls" Released: August 18, 2023

Snow Angel is the debut studio album by American singer-songwriter Reneé Rapp. It was released on August 18, 2023, through Interscope Records. The album was supported by the singles "Snow Angel", "Talk Too Much", and "Pretty Girls". The deluxe edition of the album was released on November 17, 2023, it includes a remix of "Tummy Hurts" featuring Coco Jones, and three additional songs. "Tummy Hurts", alongside the remix featuring Coco Jones, were later released on 7-inch vinyl as a promotional single on November 11, 2024.

== Background and development ==
Most of the album was written, recorded and mixed over the course of six months in early 2023, which, to Rapp, felt like "20 years". Her musical debut sees a significant shift for the actress turned singer, as she pointed out that music is everything she "ever wanted to do". However, she also revealed how "panicked" she became about the album, citing other people's thoughts and opinions on her music. Comparing her debut EP Everything to Everyone (2022) to her first full-length project, she felt like a different person creating the latter. Rapp also called the experience of collaborating with producer Alexander 23 as a growth in trusting herself.

Rapp announced the album and its lead single "Snow Angel" on June 6, 2023. She revealed further details about the development, saying that she "spent 4 months writing nearly every day". The singer reported of "traumatic experiences" that influenced her writing and dramatic recording sessions that made her cry "in damn near every studio in the valley". The recording process was supposed to be wrapped up on May 8, however, Rapp and Alexander "decided to try a hail mary".

== Critical reception ==
Professional ratings
Aggregate scores
Source	Rating
Metacritic	75/100
Review scores
Source	Rating
Dork	4/5 stars
Line of Best Fit	8/10
Rolling Stone	4/5 stars
The Skinny	3/5 stars
The Telegraph	3/5 stars

Snow Angel has received generally positive reviews from music critics. At Metacritic, which assigns a normalized rating out of 100 to reviews from mainstream critics, the album has an average score of 75 based on five reviews.

Sam Franzini of Line of Best Fit opined that the songs on Snow Angel pursue "the same angst and pent-up energy that all pop songs must have" and praised Rapp's ability to let her listeners know about her "big feelings" in "exuberant, hilarious" ways. Alex Ingle at Dork sees the album as the "arrival of Reneé Rapp" and drew comparisons to the likes of Panic! at the Disco and Carly Rae Jepsen. In a more moderate review, Lucy Fitzgerald described the record as a "well-calibrated blend of ballads and upbeat pop" with no "showstopping moments" but Rapp playing by "debut pop album rule book". Writing for The Telegraph, Poppie Platt thought that Rapp is on lane to become "a fabulous 21st century popstar" if she continues to lace her music with the same "natural wit" she presents on screen but is at risk of becoming yet another "successful young actor turned pop star" without "that special something".

== Commercial performance ==
Snow Angel debuted at number 44 on the US Billboard 200, with 18,000 album-equivalent units earned, making it the biggest first week for a debut album by a female artist in 2023. The album debuted at number 7 on the UK Albums Chart, making it her first entry on the chart.

In Australia, the album debuted at number 42 on the ARIA Albums Chart, making it Rapp's first and highest-charting entry in the country as well.

Following the release of Mean Girls and its accompanying soundtrack on January 12, 2024, as well as a performance on Saturday Night Live by Reneé on January 20, 2024, the album re-entered the US Billboard 200 at number 114 with 10,000 album-equivalent units earned on the week ending February 3, 2024. The album also re-entered the Scottish Albums Chart at number 67.

== Track listing ==
Snow Angel track listing
No.	Title	Lyrics	Music	Producer(s)	Length
1.	"Talk Too Much"	Reneé Rapp; Cleo Tighe	Alexander Glantz	Alexander 23	3:16
2.	"I Hate Boston"	Rapp; Lucy Healey; Brittany Amaradio	Glantz; Ian Fitchuk; Rob Bisel	Alexander 23	2:54
3.	"Poison Poison"	Rapp; Justin Tranter; Skyler Stonestreet	Glantz	Alexander 23	3:11
4.	"Gemini Moon"	Rapp; Tranter; Stonestreet	Glantz	Alexander 23	2:40
5.	"Snow Angel"	Rapp; Glantz	Glantz	Alexander 23	3:35
6.	"So What Now"	Rapp; Isabella Sjöstrand	Glantz; Andrew Wansel; Daniel Klein; Matt Campfield	Alexander 23; Wansel; Sjöstrand; Some Randoms	2:50
7.	"The Wedding Song"	Rapp; Amy Allen	Glantz; Jason A. Cornet; Jon Bellion	Alexander 23; Bellion; TenRoc	3:03
8.	"Pretty Girls"	Rapp; Tranter; Stonestreet	Glantz	Alexander 23; Petro AP	2:26
9.	"Tummy Hurts"	Rapp; Amaradio	Glantz	Alexander 23	2:48
10.	"I Wish"	Rapp; Tranter; Stonestreet	Glantz; Laufey Jónsdóttir	Alexander 23	3:43
11.	"Willow"	Rapp; Tighe	Glantz	Alexander 23; Petro AP	2:41
12.	"23"	Rapp; Taylor Upsahl	Glantz	Alexander 23	3:22
Total length:					36:34

Deluxe edition bonus tracks
No.	Title	Lyrics	Music	Producer(s)	Length
13.	"Messy"	Rapp; Caroline Ailin	Glantz; Peter Rycroft; Ryan Tedder; Tyler Spry	Alexander 23; Tedder	3:09
14.	"I Do"	Rapp	Wansel	Alexander 23; Wansel; Germanò; The Monsters & Strangerz	2:39
15.	"Swim"	Rapp; Glantz	Glantz	Alexander 23	3:30
16.	"Tummy Hurts" (remix; featuring Coco Jones)	Rapp; Amaradio; Jones	Glantz	Alexander 23	2:48
Total length:					48:40

== Personnel ==
Musicians

- Reneé Rapp – vocals (all tracks), background vocals (tracks 1, 5)
- Alexander 23 – acoustic guitar, bass, electric guitar, synthesizer (all tracks); background vocals (1–5, 7, 8), drum programming (1, 3–12); strings, Wurlitzer electric piano (1); drums, synth bass (3); piano (5, 8, 10), programming (6), Synclavier (10)
- Pete Jonas – drum programming (1, 5, 7)
- Cooper Cowgill – drums (1, 2, 4–7)
- Kim Vi – piano (2, 4, 6, 7, 9, 11, 12)
- Alyah Scott – background vocals (5)
- Rex DeTiger – drums (5)
- Matt Campfield – guitar (6)
- Some Randoms – guitar, keyboards (6)
- TenRoc – drum programming, electric guitar (7)
- Petro AP – background vocals, synthesizer (8, 11); drum programming, guitar, sound effects (8); piano (11)
- Towa Bird – electric guitar (9)
- Laufey – cello (10)

Technical

- Chris Gehringer – mastering
- Alex Ghenea – mixing
- Alexander 23 – engineering (1, 5), vocal production (all tracks)
- Pete Jonas – engineering (1, 5)
- Will Quinnell – mastering assistance

== Charts ==
Chart performance for Snow Angel
Chart (2023–2024)	Peak position
Australian Albums (ARIA)	42
Belgian Albums (Ultratop Flanders)	32
Dutch Albums (Album Top 100)	52
German Albums (Offizielle Top 100)	76
Irish Albums (IRMA)	97
New Zealand Albums (RMNZ)	31
Scottish Albums (Official Charts)	3
UK Albums (Official Charts)	7
US Billboard 200	44

== Certifications ==
Certifications for Snow Angel
Region	Certification	Certified units/sales
United Kingdom (BPI)	Silver	60,000^{‡}
^{‡} Sales+streaming figures based on certification alone.
