= Towa Bird =

British singer-songwriter (born 1999)

- Born: Victoria Ilagan Vergara-Bird; 30 March 1999 (age 27); Hong Kong
- Occupations: Singer-songwriter; guitarist
- Years active: 2023–present
- Musical career
- Genres: Indie rock; alternative rock; indie pop
- Instruments: Vocals; guitar
- Label: Interscope
- Website: www.towabirdofficial.com

Victoria Ilagan "Towa" Vergara-Bird (born 30 March 1999) is a British singer-songwriter and guitarist. Bird released her first single "Wild Heart" in 2023 with Interscope Records, which she signed under in 2021. She was one of two openers for the North American leg of her now-partner Reneé Rapp's Snow Hard Feelings Tour in 2023. Her debut album American Hero was released in June 2024. Her second album, Gentleman was released in May 2026.

== Early life ==
Bird was born on 30 March 1999 in Hong Kong to British and Filipino parents, though she also lived in Thailand and London while growing up. She studied at Discovery College for some time. After learning to play electric guitar when she was 12, Bird decided to pursue a career in music. It was around this age she started to realize her lesbian identity. At 14 years old, Bird formed a band called The Glass Onions and performed at dives in Hong Kong. Aged 16 she attended Hurtwood House, a private boarding school in Surrey. She studied at Goldsmiths, University of London, but dropped out after two years.

== Career ==
Bird initially rose to prominence on TikTok in 2020, where she played guitar riffs over other artists' songs. Her first video to go viral was a cover of Tame Impala's "The Less I Know the Better", recorded from her London bedroom. Soon after, Bird caught the attention of Jacob Epstein and Zack Morgenroth of Lighthouse Management & Media, and she signed with Interscope Records in 2021 before arriving in Los Angeles, having never been before. In 2022, she worked with Olivia Rodrigo and played guitar on her Disney+ documentary Olivia Rodrigo: Driving Home 2 U.

On 7 April 2023, Bird released her debut single "Wild Heart", described as "an infectious indie-pop romp" by Guitar World. In that same year, 2023, she opened for Reneé Rapp's Snow Hard Feelings tour in Europe and North America. In March 2024, Bird and Rapp made their couple debut at the Vanity Fair Oscars afterparty.

On 28 June 2024, Bird released her debut album American Hero, described by Rolling Stone as "a collection of 13 succinct pop-punk punches to the chin", with the album's title alluding to a subversion of the archetype. The album is 35 minutes long. That year, Bird performed at London's All Points East.

== Artistry ==
Bird's father "raised her on a steady diet of classic rock". The Beatles inspired her musically and aesthetically, and she has called them "the best band in the world" and Abbey Road one of her favourite albums. Other artists her father would play included Pink Floyd, Jimi Hendrix, and the Who. She described Hendrix's Are You Experienced as "very formative". As a teenager, Bird's older sister introduced her to the likes of My Chemical Romance, Avril Lavigne, and Fall Out Boy.

As she started playing guitar, Bird listened to alternative rock bands such as Blur, Kasabian, The Vaccines, and The Strokes. Blur's Parklife made her "want to be able to write like this." Lyrically, Bird covers topics such as queer relationships, loneliness, and anti-capitalism.

== Discography ==
=== Studio albums ===
List of studio albums
Title	Details
American Hero	Released: June 28, 2024; Label: Interscope; Formats: LP, streaming, digital download
Gentleman	Released: May 15, 2026; Label: Interscope; Formats: LP, streaming, digital download

=== Singles ===
Title	Year	Peak chart positions	Album
Title	Year	US Alternative	Album
"Rat Race"	2024	—	
"Gentleman"	2026	38	Gentleman

== Tours ==
=== Opening ===
- Reneé Rapp - Snow Hard Feelings Tour (2023-2024)
- Billie Eilish - Hit Me Hard and Soft: The Tour (2024)
