= Everything to Everyone (EP) =

2022 extended play by Reneé Rapp

EP by Reneé Rapp
- Released: November 11, 2022
- Recorded: 2022
- Genre: Pop; R&B
- Length: 19:22
- Label: Interscope
- Producer: Evan Blair; Tommy Brown; Cirkut; Omer Fedi; German; Taylor Hill; Connor McDonough; The Monsters & Strangerz; Blake Slatkin

Reneé Rapp chronology
Everything to Everyone (2022)	Snow Angel (2023)

Singles from Everything to Everyone
- 1. "In the Kitchen" Released: July 22, 2022; 2. "Don't Tell My Mom" Released: September 30, 2022; 3. "Too Well" Released: 2023

Everything to Everyone is the debut extended play by American actress and singer Reneé Rapp. It was released on November 11, 2022, through Interscope Records. The extended play was preceded by two singles, "In the Kitchen" and "Don't Tell My Mom", with the third single, "Too Well" being released to radio in 2023.

The deluxe version of the EP was released on February 24, 2023, featuring an extended version of the title track and one new song: "Bruises".

== Background and development ==
Following her roles in the Broadway musical Mean Girls and the HBO Max comedy series The Sex Lives of College Girls, Rapp signed a recording contract with Interscope Records in June 2022. Concurrently, Rapp released her debut single titled "Tattoos" that had been teased on her TikTok account several months earlier. In an interview with NPR, Rapp revealed that her pursuit of a record label deal began at the age of sixteen but faced rejection, further noted the traction of the TikTok videos "ended up getting her signed".

In December 2022, Rapp was named as the MTV Push Artist for the month. In an interview conducted as part of the feature, she revealed that the production of the EP was a "healing form of self-reflection". "The EP was the craziest thing because I learned everything about myself," she added. She revealed to Glamour that the tracks symbolized her journey of "figuring out living for herself".

Rapp had started writing and recording for the extended play in January 2022.

== Composition ==
During an interview with NME, Rapp called the EP as "stripped-back pop with lyrics about all the shitty things that have happened". When asked about the musical direction of the EP by Alternative Press, Rapp answered that she intended to create a mixture between "intricate" pop music writing and contemporary R&B. She added that she was "incredibly influenced by R&B" and "lean more toward not pop production".

In terms of its lyrical content, Everything to Everyone addresses themes encompassing mental health issues, being there for others, her queer identity, as well as experiences of love and emotional distress.

== Promotion ==
A few days after the EP release, Rapp announced that she would embark on her first headlining concert tour, visiting four cities across the United States.

== Track listing ==
Everything to Everyone track listing
No.	Title	Lyrics	Music	Producer(s)	Length
1.	"Everything to Everyone" (intro)	Reneé Rapp; Sarah Aarons	Henry Walter	Cirkut	1:08
2.	"In the Kitchen"	Rapp; Michael Pollack	Oliver Peterhof; Stefan Johnson; Jordan K. Johnson; Tommy Brown; 3 on a Wav; Taylor Hill; Darrius Coleman	The Monsters & Strangerz; Hill; Brown; German	3:47
3.	"Colorado"	Rapp; Taylor Upsahl	Evan Blair; Madi Yanofsky	Blair	2:52
4.	"Don't Tell My Mom"	Rapp; Upsahl	Walter; Connor McDonough; Riley McDonough	Cirkut; C. McDonough	3:09
5.	"What Can I Do"	Rapp; R. McDonough	C. McDonough; Blake Slatkin	Slatkin; C. McDonough	2:47
6.	"Too Well"	Rapp; Isabella Sjöstrand	Slatkin; Omer Fedi	Slatkin; Fedi	2:36
7.	"Moon"	Rapp; Billy Walsh; Upsahl	C. McDonough; R. McDonough; Walter	Cirkut; C. McDonough	2:59
Total length:					19:22

Deluxe edition bonus tracks
No.	Title	Lyrics	Music	Producer(s)	Length
8.	"Bruises"	Rapp; Cleo Tighe; Sjöstrand	Alexander Glantz; Elie Rizk	Alexander 23	2:41
9.	"Everything to Everyone" (extended version)	Rapp; Aarons	Walter; Glantz	Cirkut; Alexander 23	2:44
Total length:					24:48

== Personnel ==
Musicians

- Reneé Rapp – vocals, background vocals (2, 8–9)
- Alexander 23 – programming (8), electric guitar (8), drums (8), piano (8), synth bass (8), bass guitar (8), percussion (8)
- Cirkut – programming (9), synthesizer (9)
- Omer Fedi – guitar (6), programming (6), keyboards (6), drums (6), background vocals (6)
- Connor McDonough – programming (5), piano (5)
- Blake Slatkin – programming (5–6), keyboards (6), background vocals (6), drums (6)

Technical

- Alexander 23 – production (8–9), engineering (8)
- Evan Blair – production (3)
- Tommy Brown – production (2)
- Cirkut – production (1, 4, 7), vocal production (1, 9), engineering (1)
- Omer Fedi – vocal production (6)
- Chris Gehringer – mastering
- German – production (2), vocal production (2)
- Taylor Hill – production (2)
- Najeeb Jones – mixing (1–2, 4, 7, 9)
- David Kim – mixing (3)
- Tony Maserati – mixing (1–5, 7–9)
- Connor McDonough – production (4, 7), vocal production (5)
- Adam Mersel – production coordinating (8–9)
- The Monsters & Strangerz – production (2)
- Julia Norelli – mixing assistance (8–9)
- Lillia Parsa – production coordinating (8–9)
- Blake Slatkin – production (5–6), engineering (5–6), vocal production (5–6)
- Spike Stent – mixing (6)
- Gabriella Wayne – mixing (5)
- Matt Wolach – mixing (6)

== Charts ==
Chart performance for Everything to Everyone
Chart (2022–2023)	Peak position
US Heatseekers Albums (Billboard)	14
US Top Album Sales (Billboard)	47
