= Not My Fault (song) =

2023 single by Reneé Rapp and Megan Thee Stallion

Single by Reneé Rapp and Megan Thee Stallion

from the album Mean Girls (Music from the Motion Picture)
- Released: December 15, 2023
- Genre: Disco-funk; pop rap; disco-pop
- Length: 2:50
- Label: Interscope
- Composers: Jeff Richmond; Nell Benjamin; Billy Walsh; Ryan Tedder; Alexander Glantz; Jasper Harris
- Lyricists: Reneé Rapp; Megan Pete
- Producers: Ryan Tedder; Alexander 23; Jasper Harris; Jeff Richmond

Reneé Rapp singles chronology
"Pretty Girls" (2023)	"Not My Fault" (2023)	"Tummy Hurts" (2024)

Megan Thee Stallion singles chronology
"Cobra" (2023)	"Not My Fault" (2023)	"Hiss" (2024)

Music video
- "Not My Fault" on YouTube

"Not My Fault" is a song by American singer Reneé Rapp and American rapper Megan Thee Stallion from the 2024 Mean Girls musical film adaptation, in which Rapp portrays Regina George. The song was written by the artists and the Broadway musical's original composer Jeff Richmond and original lyricist Nell Benjamin, alongside Ryan Tedder, Alexander 23, Billy Walsh, and Jasper Harris and was released on December 15, 2023, as the lead single for the film soundtrack. The disco-funk pop rap song became the most commercially successful single from the soundtrack and a moderate chart success, peaking at number 2 on the Billboard Bubbling Under Hot 100 and charting in the UK and Canada at numbers 61 and 82, respectively.

It is one of the two songs written specially for the film, with the other songs being from the original stage musical. The song plays during the end credits scene and is the only song from the soundtrack that is not used as a musical number.

== Background ==
The song was first announced on December 10, 2023 by Megan Thee Stallion in a clip via Reneé Rapp's Instagram account. On December 13, Rapp posted the cover art of the single on Twitter, commenting "meg told me to put my ass out so I put my ass out".

"Not My Fault" plays during the closing credits of Mean Girls. In an interview with TheWrap, Rapp revealed how the song came about:

I had one day off on tour while I was in L.A., for the Oakland and then Los Angeles show, and honestly, I knew we needed an end credits [song]. And I really was just like, "Damn, I have one day off, we might as well just try. Because if we don't, then I'm not going to be able to think about anything the next month while I'm away, and I'll be stressed because I will have to do it on the road, and I'd like to be in like a studio that I feel good in. So we just went in one day, me and a couple of my friends who I work with a lot, and it was just the first song that happened. It came and it ended up being like the one that we love.

== Composition and lyrics ==
A disco-funk inspired "disco-pop" song and pop rap song with themes of self-love and empowerment, "Not My Fault" opens with dialogue sampled from the original 2004 film Mean Girls, in which Cady Heron yells at Janis Ian: "You know what? It's not my fault you're like in love with me or something!" It is followed by the chorus, in which Reneé Rapp sings about leaving a party with someone else's girlfriend: "It's not my fault / You came with her but she might leave with me / It's not my fault / You've gotta pay for what I get for free". Rapp continues to emphasize her superiority in sexual attractiveness, dismissing gossip about her in the first verse and hinting her sexual attraction to women in the second verse: "Get her number, get her name / Get a good thing while you can / Kiss a blonde (Kiss a blonde), kiss a friend (Okay) / Can a gay girl get an, 'Amen?' (Amen; woo)". In the third verse, Megan Thee Stallion similarly boasts being sexually alluring, describing she is a "mood" and a "stallion but they comin' for me like Trojan" and claiming "Bitch so bad, dudes thought I was A.I., ballin' like A.I.", before calling herself the "Black Regina George".

== Music video ==
An official music video premiered on January 5, 2024. Directed by Mia Barnes, it shows Reneé Rapp and Megan Thee Stallion dressed in all pink, dancing together in a pink room, snatching wigs off of and smashing plastic mannequins, and mirroring each other. Later on, Rapp receives "Regina George" tattoos on her body and wears darker clothes, and Megan wears the character's white tank top outfit from the original film, with holes showing off her purple bra. Rapp also starts a school riot in the second half of the video. The video features scenes from the 2024 Mean Girls film and an appearance of the "burn book".

== Live performances ==
Reneé Rapp and Megan Thee Stallion performed the song for the first time on Saturday Night Live on January 21, 2024. The performance was introduced by Rachel McAdams, who played Regina George in the original Mean Girls film.

== Charts ==
=== Weekly charts ===
Weekly chart performance for "Not My Fault"
Chart (2023–2024)	Peak position
Canada Hot 100 (Billboard)	82
Canada CHR/Top 40 (Billboard)	30
Ireland (IRMA)	54
New Zealand Hot Singles (RMNZ)	8
San Marino Airplay (SMRTV Top 50)	10
Serbia Airplay (Radiomonitor)	14
UK Singles (Official Charts)	61
US Bubbling Under Hot 100 (Billboard)	2
US Adult Pop Airplay (Billboard)	31
US Dance Airplay (Billboard)	23
US Pop Airplay (Billboard)	12

=== Year-end charts ===
2024 year-end chart performance for "Not My Fault"
Chart (2024)	Position
US Mainstream Top 40 (Billboard)	49

== Certifications ==
Certifications for "Not My Fault"
Region	Certification	Certified units/sales
Australia (ARIA)	Gold	35,000^{‡}
Canada (Music Canada)	Gold	40,000^{‡}
^{‡} Sales+streaming figures based on certification alone.
