= Cat & Calmell =

Australian pop duo

- Origin: Sydney, Australia
- Genre: Pop music
- Years active: 2020–present
- Label: EMI Australia
- Members: Catherine Stratton; Calmell Teagle

Cat & Calmell are an Australian pop duo band from Sydney, Australia.

== Career ==
Cat & Calmell released their debut single "Dumbshit" in October 2020. Theyl released "Get Old" in June 2021. The single was their fourth from their debut EP, Life of Mine. The duo said the EP "encapsulates a time in our lives that was full of a lot of excitement, but also a lot of uncertainty. It's such a time-stamp of our slightly younger and slightly more reckless days. A lot of the songs on this EP were written awhile back, so it's nice to see where we were and where we came from both in terms of our music and our headspace back then."

On 29 September 2023, the duo released the mini album, How Do You Feel?

== Members ==
- Catherine Stratton
- Calmell Teagle

== Discography ==
=== Extended plays ===
List of EPs, with release date and label shown
Title	Details
Life of Mine	Released: 25 June 2021; Label: EMI Music; Formats: Digital download
Live from Splendour XR	Released: 6 October 2021; Label: EMI Music; Formats: Digital download
How Do You Feel?	Released: 29 September 2023; Label: EMI Music; Formats: Digital download
Live Laugh Cool Star	Released: 28 November 2025; Label: Universal; Formats: Digital download

== Awards and nominations ==
=== APRA Awards ===
The APRA Awards are held in Australia and New Zealand by the Australasian Performing Right Association to recognise songwriting skills, sales and airplay performance by its members annually.

Year	Nominee / work	Award	Result	Ref.
2022	"Dramatic"	Most Performed Pop Work	Nominated	

=== J Awards ===
The J Awards are an annual series of Australian music awards that were established by the Australian Broadcasting Corporation's youth-focused radio station Triple J. They commenced in 2005.

Year	Nominee / work	Award	Result	Ref.
2023	"Feel Alive"	Australian Video of the Year	Nominated	

=== Rolling Stone Australia Awards ===
The Rolling Stone Australia Awards are awarded annually in January or February by the Australian edition of Rolling Stone magazine for outstanding contributions to popular culture in the previous year.

Year	Nominee / work	Award	Result	Ref.
2022	Cat & Calmell	Best New Artist	Nominated	
