= Naomi Ellemers =

Dutch social and organizational psychologist

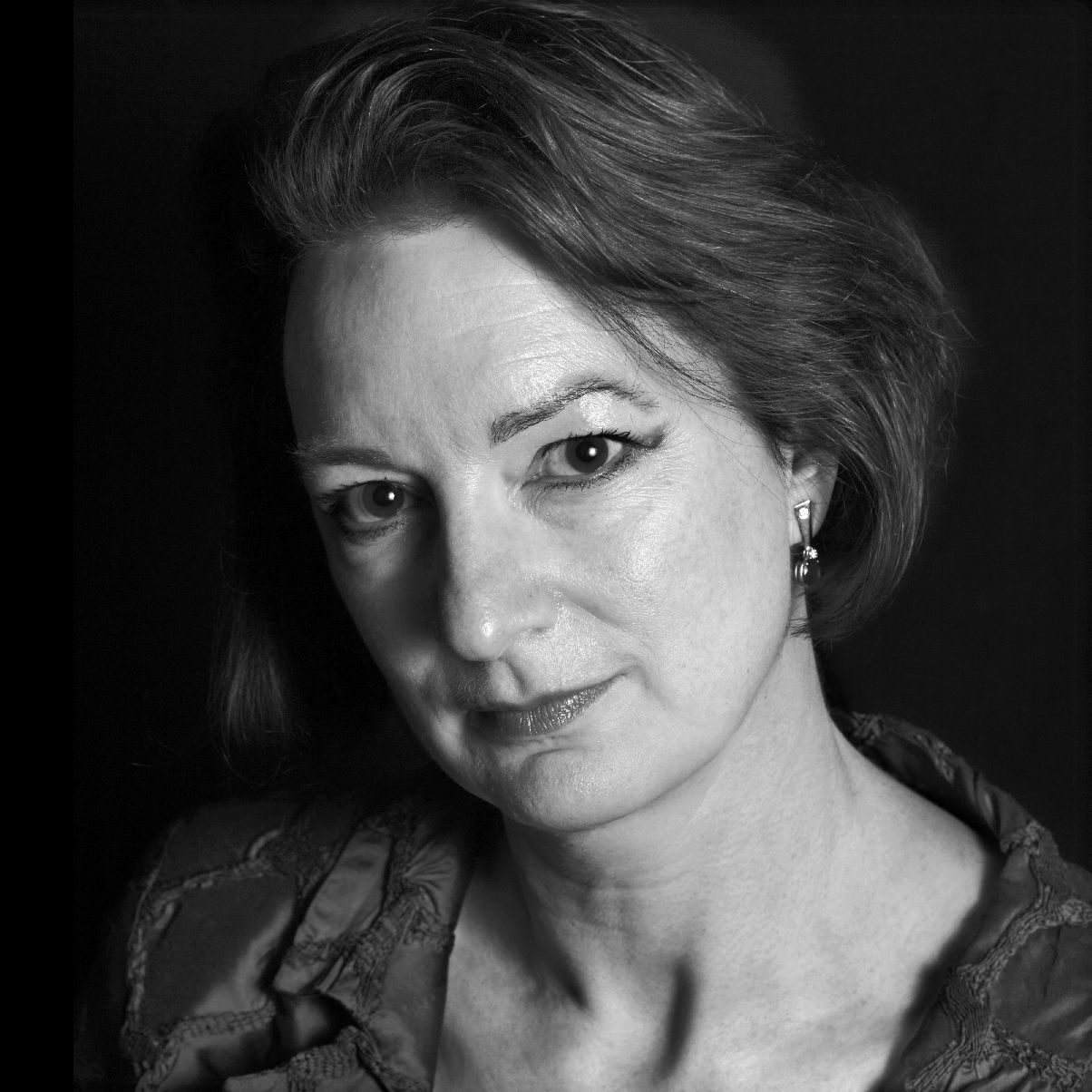
- Born: January 31, 1963 (age 63); Amsterdam, Netherlands
- Awards: Spinoza Prize (2010)

Academic work
- Discipline: Diversity in organizations, Ethnical climate, Work motivation, Power and status, Social psychology, Organizational psychology
- Institutions: Rijksuniversiteit Groningen (PhD), Vrije Universiteit Amsterdam, Universiteit Leiden, Universiteit Utrecht
- Notable works: International Handbook of the Psychology of Morality | The Moral Organization | De voorbeeldige organisatie | World of Difference | Morality and the Regulation of Social Behavior | Je werkt anders dan je denkt | Neuroscience of Prejudice and Intergroup Relations
- Website: www.naomi-ellemers.nl

Naomi Ellemers (born 31 January 1963 in Amsterdam) is a distinguished professor of social psychology at Utrecht University since September 2015, and a member of the European Commission's Group of Chief Scientific Advisors.

In 2023, she was elected to the American Philosophical Society.

== Career ==
Ellemers studied social psychology at Rijksuniversiteit Groningen from 1981 to1987 and graduated in 1991 in Groningen with her thesis Identity management strategies, followed by a position as assistant professor and later as associate professor at Vrije Universiteit Amsterdam. Between 1999 and 2015 she was a professor at Universiteit Leiden with the assignment sociale psychologie van de organisatie (Social psychology of the organization). Since September 2015 she is distinguished professor at Universiteit Utrecht. In 2019 she became honorary professor at School of Psychology University of Queensland in Australia.

From 2015 to 2023 Ellemers was member supervisory board PricewaterhouseCoopers Nederland (expert for culture and behaviour)

From 2020 - 2022 she was chair of the KNAW (Royal Netherlands Academy of Arts and Sciences) advisory committee Breeding ground prevention of undesirable behaviour in academia.

== Work ==
Naomi Ellemers researches the way people live and work together in groups. She especially focusses on how people's behaviour is influenced by others around them - whether they are present or not. She does experiments on brain activity and physical stress, but also looks into how people behave at work.

Specialization: diversity & inclusion and integrity & ethical behaviour

In 2009, Ellemers received the KNAW Merianprijs (Academy Merian Prize). A year later she received the prestigious Spinoza Prize for her work regarding her specialization. In 2018 she received the senior Career Contribution Award of Society for Personality and Social Psychology. In 2019 she received the Aristoteles Prize from the European Federation of Psychology Associates (EFPA), as well as an honorary doctorate from the Université catholique de Louvain.

In 2010, Ellemers was appointed member of Koninklijke Hollandsche Maatschappij van Wetenschappen (Royal Netherlands Academy of Arts and Sciences) and as of 2011 she is member of Royal Netherlands Academy of Arts and Sciences. In 2014 she was appointed corresponding fellow of the British Academy for the Humanities and Social Sciences, and in 2020 she was appointed member of Academia Europaea. In 2022 she had the honor of being nominated For the SPSP Heritage Wall of Fame and was she elected for the American Academy of Arts & Sciences.

In 2005 she together with three other prominent female professors, Ineke Sluiter, Judi Mesman en Eveline Crone, established Athena's Angels, an organization which defend the interests of women academics

Ellemers is one of the lead applicants and chair of the board of the NWO Gravity Program Sustainable Cooperation (SCOOP). She is one of the initiators of The Netherlands Inclusiveness Monitor (NIM) which investigates the measures and actions organizations take to become more inclusive. It connects these findings to the experiences of employees and provides organizations with advice on which steps to take to become truly inclusive.

She cooperates with various compliance officers, among others Autoriteit Financiële Markten (AFM) in order to give advice on and to reinforce behaviour and culture in organizations.

In 2019 the Dutch feminist monthly magazine Opzij elected her for the Opzij top 100 of most powerful women of the Netherlands in the category education and science.

== Awards ==
- Vrije Universiteit Amsterdam: Psychology teaching award (1991)

Honorary Fellowships in recognition of distinguished contribution to science:

- Association for Psychological Science (2000)
- Society for Experimental Social Psychology (2009)
- Society for Personality and Social Psychology (2013)
- Royal Holland Society of Sciences and Humanities (KHMW, 2010)
- Royal Netherlands Academy of Arts and Sciences (KNAW, 2011)
- British Academy for the Humanities and Social Sciences (FBA, 2014)
- Academia Europaea (MAE, 2020)
- Society of Personality and Social Psychology's Wall of Fame (2022)
- American Academy of Arts and Sciences (2022)
- American Philosophical Society (2023)

Publication awards:

- Rosabeth Moss Kanter Award for Excellence in Work-Family Research (2009)
- Journal of Organizational Behavior (2010)
- Journal of Financial Regulation and Compliance (2017)
- Women in Financial Services Diversity Research Accelerator Award (2017)
- Professional association of public regulators – VIDE (2020)
- Top 15 public relations insights of 2020 – Institute for public relations

National awards:

- Merian Award for women in science (2010, KNAW).
- Spinoza Award (2010, NWO), the highest scientific distinction in the Netherlands.
- Top-100 most influential women in the Netherlands (2019; 2020, OPZIJ)

International awards:

- European Award for early achievement (1990, EASP)
- European Award for significant contribution (2008, EASP)
- European Award for service to the field (2017, EASP)
- Senior Career Contribution Award, Society for Personality and Social Psychology (2019)
- ISA Medal for Science, Institute for Advanced Studies, Bologna University (2019)
- Aristotle Prize, European Federation of Psychology Associations (2019)
- Honorary Doctorate, UC Louvain, Belgium (2019)

== Publications (selection) ==
Based on her academic acknowledgement, Ellemers writes popularizing texts about current issues. For the Dutch Financial Newspaper, Het Financieele Dagblad (FD), she writes a monthly expert column, and she writes a blog about 'social climates' for Psychology Today.

Her scientific work consist of more than 200 magazine articles, among others in Science, Proceedings of the National Academy of Sciences, Nature Human Behaviour, Academy of Management Review, Psychological Review, Annual Review of Psychology, Journal of Personality and Social Psychology.

A few distinctive publications are:

2023	International Handbook of the Psychology of Morality	Ellemers, N., Pagliaro, S., & Van Nunspeet, F.	Routledge		
2023	The importance of morality for collective self-esteem and motivation to engage in socially responsible behavior at work among professionals in the finance industry	Chopova, T., Ellemers, N.	Business Ethics, the Environment & Responsibility		
2022	The moral organization: Key issues, analyses and solutions.	Ellemers, N., & De Gilder, D.	Cham: Springer publishers		
2021	The social responsibility of organizations: Perceptions of organizational morality as a key mechanism explaining the relation between CSR activities and stakeholder support	Ellemers, N., Chopova, T.	Research in Organizational Behavior	doi:10.1016/j.riob.2022.100156	
2021	Don't tell me about my moral failures but motivate me to improve: Increasing effectiveness of outgroup criticism by criticizing one's competence	Rösler, I., Van Nunspeet, F., & Ellemers, N.	European Journal of Social Psychology	doi:10.1002/ejsp.2764	
2020	Categorization and identity as motivational principles in intergroup relations	Ellemers, N., & De Gilder, D.	Social Psychology: Handbook of Basic Principles		pp 452–472
2020	Navigating the social world: Toward an integrated framework for evaluating self individuals and groups	Abele, A. E., Ellemers, N., Fiske, S. T., Koch, A., Yzerbyt, V.	Psychological Review		
2020	Adversarial alignment enables competing models to engage in cooperative theory-building, toward cumulative science	Ellemers, N., Fiske, S., Abele, A.E., Koch, A., & Yzerbyt, V.	Proceedings of the National Academies of Sciences		117, 7561-7567
2020	Social evaluation: Comparing models across interpersonal, intragroup, intergroup, several-group, and many-group contexts Academic Press	Koch, A., Yzerbyt, V., Abele, A., Ellemers, N., Fiske, S.	Advances in Experimental Social Psychology		p. 68
2020	Neuroscience and the social origins of (im)moral behavior: How neural underpinnings of social categorization and conformity affect every day (im)moral behavior	Ellemers, N., & Van Nunspeet, F.	Current Directions in Psychological Science		29, 513-520
2020	Science as collaborative knowledge generation	Ellemers, N.	British Journal of Social Psychology	doi:10.1111/bjso.12430	Landmark article, nr. 60, p. 1-28
2020	Using social and behavioural science to support COVID-19 pandemic response	Van Bavel, J. J., Baicker, K., Boggio, P. S., Capraro, V., Cichocka, A., Cikara, M., Crockett, M. J., Crum, A. J., Douglas, K. M., Druckman, J. N. Drury, J., Dube, O., Ellemers, N., Finkel, E. J., Fowler, J. H., Gelfand, M., Han, S., Haslam, S. A., Jetten, J., Kitayama, S., Mobbs, D., Napper, L. E., Packer, D. J., Pennycook, G., Peters, E., Petty, R. E., Rand, D. G., Reicher, S. D., Schnall, S., Shariff, A., Skitka, L. J., Smith, S. S., Sunstein, C. R., Tabri, N., Tucker, J. A., van der Linden, S., Van Lange, P. A. M., Weeden, K. A., Wohl, M. J. A., Zaki, J., Zion, S. & Willer, R.	Nature Human Behavior	doi:10.1038/s41562-020-0884-z	nr. 4, p. 460-471
2019	The psychology of morality: A review and analysis of empirical studies published from 1940 through 2017	Ellemers, N., Van der Toorn, J., Paunov, Y., & Van Leeuwen, T	Personality and Social Psychology Review		23, 332-366
2018	Morality and social identity	Ellemers, N.	The Oxford Handbook of the Human Essence		pp. 147–158
2018	Gender stereotypes	Ellemers, N.	Annual Review of Psychology		nr. 69, p. 275-298.
2017	Morality and the regulation of social behavior: Groups as moral anchors.	Ellemers, N.	Milton Park, UK: Routledge / Taylor & Francis	ISBN 978-1138958166	
2017	Ethisch klimaat op het werk: Op zoek naar het nieuwe normaal	Ellemers, N.	Universiteit Utrecht		Inaugural lecture
2013	Neuroscience of prejudice and intergroup relations	Ellemers, N.	Psychology Press, New York	ISBN 978-1-84872-641-3	Edited by Belle Derks, Daan Scheepers, and Naomi Ellemers
2012	Je werkt anders dan je denkt	Ellemers, N., & De Gilder, D.	Business Contact	ISBN 978-9047004516	
2000	Betrokkenheid bij het werk. Een kwestie van verstand of gevoel?	Ellemers, N.	Universiteit Leiden		Inaugural lecture
1999	Social identity. Context, commitment, content		Blackwell, Oxford	ISBN 0-631-20691-4	Edited by Naomi Ellemers, Russell Spears and Bertjan Doosje
1991	Identity management strategies. The influence of socio-structural variables on strategies of individual mobility and social change	Ellemers, N.	Rijksuniversiteit Groningen		Thesis
