= Joji =

Joji (じょうじ, 丈二, or 譲二, 城二, 譲治 multiple variants) is a Japanese masculine given name. It is also the Japanese pronunciation of the Western name "George" (ジョージ).

It commonly refers to:

- Jōji, an era in Japanese history
- Joji (musician), stage name of musician and former Internet personality George Miller

Joji, Jouji or Jōji may also refer to:

== People with the name ==
- Marampudi Joji (1942–2010), Archbishop of Hyderabad
- George Akiyama (ジョージ 秋山, Jōji Akiyama) (1943–2020), Japanese manga artist
- Joji Arimori (有森 丈時; born 1962), pseudonym of Japanese manga storywriter, novelist and screenwriter Shin Kibayashi
- Joji Banuve (1940–2009), Fijian politician
- Jōji Hashiguchi (橋口 譲二; born 1949), Japanese photographer
- Joji Hattori (服部 譲二; born 1969), Japanese violinist and conductor
- George Iida (飯田 譲治; born 1959), Japanese film and television director
- Joji Iwaoka (岩岡 譲二; born 1933), Japanese ice hockey player
- Jōji Jonokuchi, pseudonym of writer Kiyohiko Azuma
- Jōji Kamio (神尾 丈治), Japanese author
- Joji Kato (加藤 条治; born 1985), Japanese speedskater
- Joji Kotobalavu, Fiji civil servant
- Johji Manabe (真鍋 譲治; born 1964), Japanese manga artist
- Jōji Matsumoto (松本 烝治; 1877–1954), legal scholar, politician and cabinet minister in the pre-war Empire of Japan
- Joji Matsuoka (松岡 錠司; born 1961), Japanese film director
- George Morikawa (森川 ジョージ; born 1966), Japanese manga artist
- Joji Nagashima (永島 譲二; born 1955), Japanese-German automobile designer for BMW
- Jouji Nakata (中田 譲治; born 1954), Japanese voice actor who is affiliated with the Office Osawa agency
- Joji Obara (織原 城二; born 1952), Japanese-Korean criminal
- Joji Ohara (小原 譲治; 1905–1990), Japanese cinematographer
- Jouji Shibue (渋江 譲二; born 1983), Japanese model and actor
- Joji Takami, 15 year-old victim in the 2004 Ōmuta murders
- Joji Takeuchi (竹内 譲次; born 1985), Japanese professional basketball player
- Joji Tani (谷 譲治; born 1956), birth name of special effects artist, film director, and former musician, Screaming Mad George
- Jōji Yanami (八奈見 乗児; 1931–2021), Japanese voice actor
- Joji Yuasa (湯浅 譲二; 1929–2024), Japanese composer of contemporary classical music

== Film ==
- Joji (film), a 2021 Malayalam-language film
