= Jake Shane =

American influencer and comedian (born 1999)

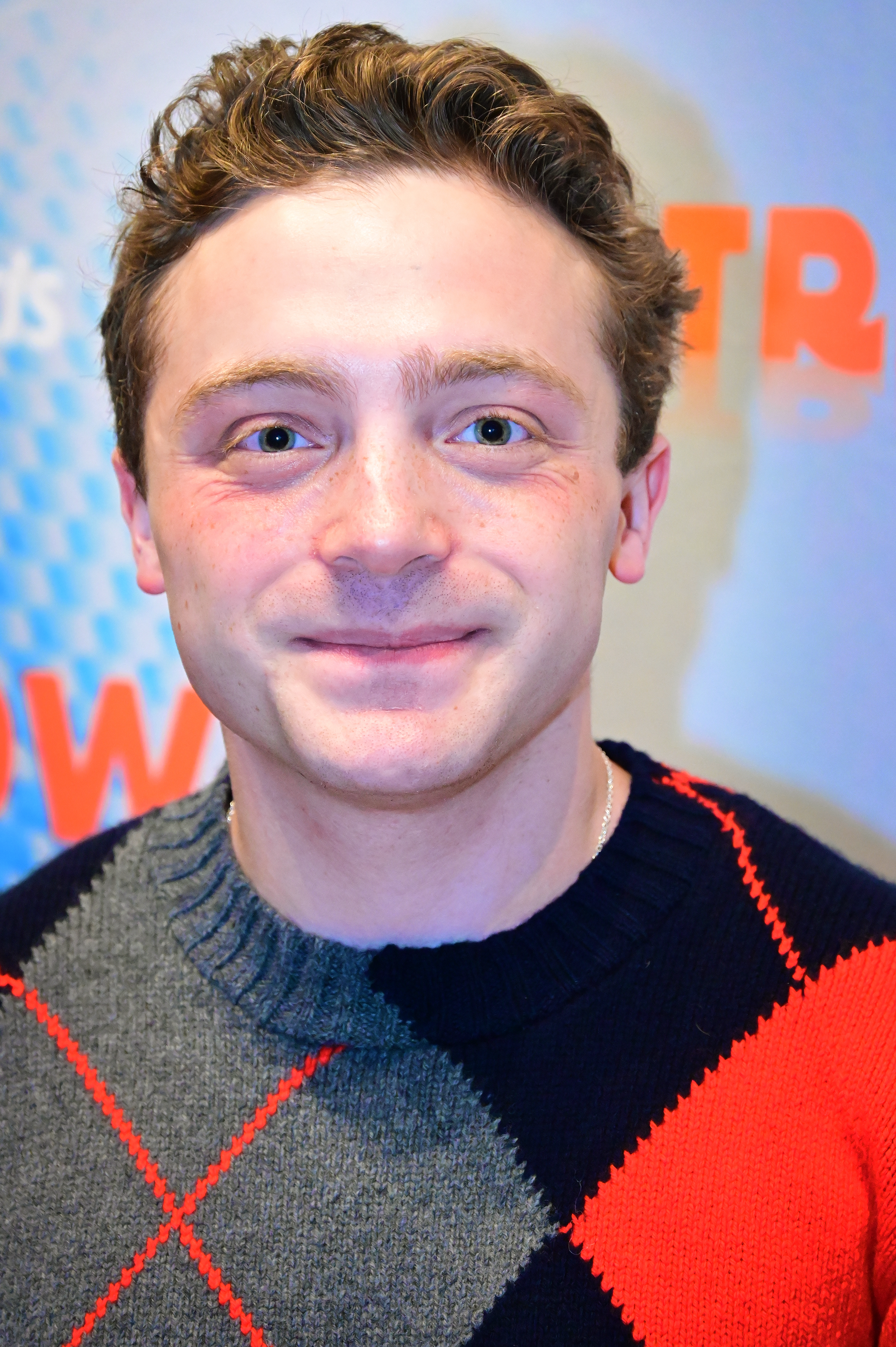
- Shane in 2026
- Born: Jacob Shane Roshkow; October 27, 1999 (age 27); Los Angeles, California, U.S.
- Other name: Octopusslover8
- Education: University of Southern California (BA)
- Occupations: Social media personality; comedian; actor
- Years active: 2021–present
- Parents: Matt Roshkow (father); Helaine Olen (mother)

TikTok information
- Page: Jake Shane
- Genre: Skits
- Followers: 3.9 million
- Last updated: August 20, 2025
- Website: passthatpuss.com

Jacob Shane Roshkow (born October 27, 1999) is an American social media personality, comedian, and actor. In 2023, his TikTok videos featuring humorous reenactments of historical events went viral. Also in 2023, he was nominated for a Streamy Award and appeared on TikTok's inaugural LGBTQ+ Pride Visionary Voices List and on the Forbes 30 Under 30 list.

== Early life ==
Jacob Shane Roshkow was born on October 27, 1999, in Los Angeles, California, and moved to Washington Heights in New York at the age of two. His mother, Helaine Olen, is an author, and a columnist for The Washington Post. His father, Matt Roshkow, is a screenwriter.

Jake has described himself as "a closeted kid". He has stated that he did acting as a child, performing in his school's production of Thoroughly Modern Millie in sixth grade, but quit due to his insecurities after switching schools. He also took improv lessons at Gotham Comedy Club while attending The Calhoun School on the Upper West Side, Manhattan. Shane moved to Los Angeles at 18 while working as an assistant at a record label. He attended the University of Southern California, where he graduated with a Bachelor of Arts degree in public relations in 2022. Shane is a non-religious Jewish person.

== Career ==
Shane started his social media career in 2021 as an Instagram food critic of octopus, using the handle @passthatpuss. He created it after his mom took him to try octopus for the first time when he was in high school. Jake created a TikTok account also for octopus reviews, where @passthatpuss was taken so he created the username "@octopusslover8" because they have eight tentacles. In February 2023, Shane became known for his TikTok videos, in which he humorously reenacted historical events per requests in his comments, starting with the Clinton–Lewinsky scandal, which gained him 100,000 followers within one week of its posting. Other reenactments included dinosaurs seeing a comet, the Last Supper, John Hancock signing the United States Declaration of Independence, Moses parting the Red Sea, and a president who did not make it onto Mount Rushmore. He signed with WME in March 2023; by then his account had gained over one and a half million followers.

Shane was nominated for the Streamy Award for Breakout Creator at the 13th Streamy Awards in 2023, though the award was won by Dylan Mulvaney. He was also included on TikTok's inaugural LGBTQ+ Pride Visionary Voices List in May 2023. In September 2023, he signed with United Talent Agency for representation in all areas. He was featured on the 2024 Forbes 30 Under 30 list and had more than two and a half million followers on TikTok by December 2023.

Shane's podcast, Therapuss with Jake Shane, in which Shane responds to listener questions in the style of a therapy session alongside a different co-host each episode, launched in January 2024. On November 22, 2024, Shane released his debut album Puss & Poems.

In 2025, Shane was cast in season four of the comedy series Hacks, which co-stars Jean Smart and Hannah Einbinder.

The comedian and digital creator joined the cast of All Out: Comedy About Ambition, beginning February 17, 2026, at the Nederlander Theatre in New York City. He starred alongside Ray Romano, Nicholas Braun and Jenny Slate in the production. All four stars made their Broadway debuts and continued through the show's scheduled closing, on March 8.

Shane took on the role of chief creative officer at Katjes in February 2026. The German candy maker, which generates around $1 billion in revenue from its gummy line, brought him on board to help grow its presence in the U.S.

In 2026, Shane was cast in season two of the comedy series Adults.

Shane has occasionally been criticized for lacking the skillset and media literacy of traditional entertainment journalists. Shane is seen by some media analysts and members of the public as emblematic of the move away from trained journalists in favor of influencers.

== Personal life ==
Shane frequently posts on social media about his mental health, specifically regarding his experiences with anxiety and obsessive–compulsive disorder, which he has stated he has struggled with since age seven and was diagnosed with as a teenager. He also often posts videos about him being a Swiftie.

== Filmography ==
=== Film ===
Year	Title	Role	Notes
2026	Wishful Thinking	Jeff	Film debut

=== Television ===
Year	Title	Role	Notes
2025	Hacks	Social Media Girlie	3 episodes
2025	Too Much	Himself	1 episode
2026	Adults	Garrett	1 episode

=== Theatre ===
Year	Title	Role	Theatre	Notes
2026	All Out: Comedy About Ambition	Performer	Nederlander Theatre	Broadway debut

== Awards and nominations ==
Year	Award	Category	Work	Result
2023	Streamy Awards	Breakout Creator	Himself	Nominated
