= Alexander 23 =

American singer-songwriter (born 1995)

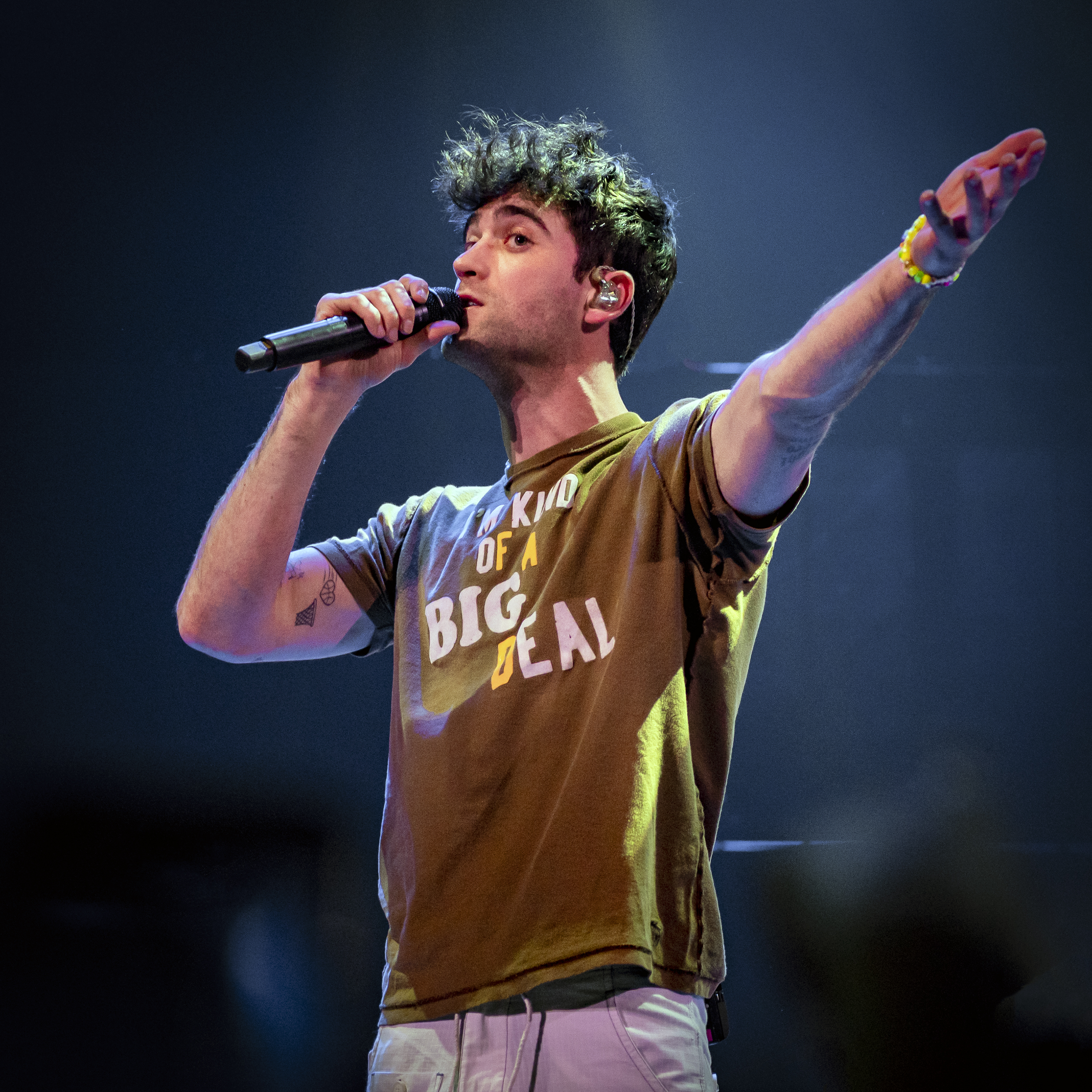
- Alexander 23 performing in 2022

Background information
- Born: Alexander Glantz; January 23, 1995 (age 31); Deerfield, Illinois, U.S.
- Genres: Pop; indie pop; indie rock
- Occupations: Singer; songwriter; producer; engineer
- Years active: 2019–present
- Label: Interscope
- Member of: Top Bunk
- Website: alexander23.com

Alexander Glantz (born January 23, 1995), known professionally as Alexander 23, is an American singer-songwriter and record producer. Since releasing his first string of singles and EP in 2019, he has worked with artists such as Olivia Rodrigo, John Mayer, Noah Kahan, Tate McRae, Charlie Puth, Laufey, Role Model, Reneé Rapp, Omar Apollo, Selena Gomez, Jeremy Zucker, Joji, Bella Kay, Kenny Beats, David Kushner, Addison Rae, Teezo Touchdown, Glaive and Megan Thee Stallion, and has accumulated over a billion streams on his own music.

== Early life ==
Glantz was raised in Deerfield, Illinois, a suburb of Chicago, Illinois. At the age of 8, Glantz saw his father playing guitar which inspired him to learn as well. As a teenager, he joined a band where he also learned how to play bass, piano, and drums. He has two siblings: a younger brother, Brady, and a younger sister, Olivia. He is Jewish.

After high school, Glantz went to the University of Pennsylvania for engineering, but dropped out a year later to pursue music more seriously. Glantz then moved to Los Angeles to begin songwriting and producing for others and soon after he decided to write songs for himself and to pursue a career as an artist.

== Career ==
Alexander signed to Interscope in 2019. He released his first single "Dirty AF1s" in 2019 which made it to Spotify's New Music Friday playlist and was recognized as Apple Music's "Bop of the Week". After releasing five subsequent singles, his first EP I'm Sorry I Love You was released by Interscope in October 2019.

Since the release of his first EP, Alexander has released a number of singles as well as collaborations with artists such as Selena Gomez, Jeremy Zucker, Chelsea Cutler, and mxmtoon. He has also written and produced songs for a number of other artists such as Role Model, Olivia Rodrigo, Tate McRae and Louis The Child.

He made his first live debut opening for Alec Benjamin on his Outrunning Karma Tour in 2019 and has since opened for artists such as mxmtoon, Chelsea Cutler, and Omar Apollo. Alexander was set to open for Lauv during his How I'm Feeling Tour in August 2020, however, due to the COVID-19 pandemic these tour dates were cancelled. Alexander instantly sold out his first two headline shows in Los Angeles in February 2020.

When describing his decision to go by Alexander 23, Alexander said, "I was born on the 23rd, I grew up in Chicago and saw Michael Jordan as a huge figure in basketball and was obsessed with him, and he wore number 23. Plus, I was 23 when I started writing these songs. I knew that I wanted to go by my real first name and I just thought I'd spice it up by adding number 23 at the end."

Alexander is also a member of the ten-member band Top Bunk.

His second EP, Oh No, Not Again! was released on February 19, 2021, on Interscope Records.

In 2021, he played Dove Cameron's love interest in the official music video for her single, "LazyBaby".

Alexander co-produced "Good 4 U" by Olivia Rodrigo with Dan Nigro which was released on May 14, 2021, through Geffen and Interscope and debuted atop the Billboard Hot 100.

Alexander was nominated for Album of the Year at the 2022 Grammy Awards for his production work on Sour by Olivia Rodrigo.

In the spring of 2022, Alexander joined John Mayer as the opening act on his Sob Rock tour.

Alexander released his debut album "Aftershock" in July 2022 which had no features but contained the lead single "Hate Me If It Helps" which was co-written by Olivia Rodrigo, "The Hardest Part" which featured background vocals from Chappell Roan and "RIP You and Me" which includes an outro piano solo from Charlie Puth.

In January 2023, he collaborated with famed Japanese designer Hiroshi Fujiwara for the single art on his song "How To Drive".

Alexander served as the executive producer for Reneé Rapp's debut album Snow Angel which was released in August 2023.

Alexander produced and co-wrote every song on Jake Shane's comedy album Puss & Poems which was released November 22, 2024 and went to #1 on the iTunes Comedy Charts.

== Discography ==
=== Albums ===
Title	Details
Aftershock	Released: July 15, 2022; Label: Interscope; Formats: Digital download, streaming, cassette, Vinyl, CD, streaming

=== EPs ===
Title	Details
I'm Sorry I Love You	Released: October 25, 2019; Label: Interscope; Formats: Digital download, streaming
Oh No, Not Again!	Released: February 19, 2021; Label: Interscope; Formats: Digital download, streaming

=== Singles ===
==== As lead artist ====
Title	Year	Peak chart positions	Certifications	Album
Title	Year	SWE Heat	Certifications	Album
"Dirty AF1s"	2019	—		I'm Sorry I Love You
"When I Die"	2019	—		I'm Sorry I Love You
"Mars"	2019	—		I'm Sorry I Love You
"Sad"	2019	—		I'm Sorry I Love You
"High School"	2019	—		I'm Sorry I Love You
"See You Later"	2019	—		I'm Sorry I Love You
"Another Summer Night Without You"	2019	—		13 Reasons Why: Season 3 (A Netflix Original Series Soundtrack)
"I Hate You So Much"	2020	—		Non-album singles
"Loving You Gets Hard"	2020	—		Non-album singles
"IDK You Yet"	2020	19	RIAA: Platinum; MC: Platinum; BPI: Silver	Oh No, Not Again!
"Caught in the Middle"	2020	—		Oh No, Not Again!
"Brainstorm"	2020	—		Oh No, Not Again!
"Nothing's the Same" (with Jeremy Zucker)	2020	—		Oh No, Not Again!
"Cry Over Boys"	2021	—		Oh No, Not Again!
"Come Here and Leave Me Alone"	2021	—		Oh No, Not Again!
"Hate Me If It Helps"	2022	—		Aftershock
"Cosplay (Stripped)"	2022	—		Aftershock
"Ill" (featuring Kenny Beats)	2022	—		Non-album singles
"Ain't Christmas" (with Laufey)	2022	—		Non-album singles
"How to Drive"	2023	—		Non-album singles
"I Wanna Live Forever"	2023	—		Non-album singles
"How Much Longer?"	2024	—		Non-album singles
"On My Mind" (featuring Cory Wong)	2024	—		Non-album singles
"Yours"	2024	—		Non-album singles
"Cozy" (with Jeremy Zucker & Lauv)	2024	—		Non-album singles
"—" denotes a release that did not chart or was not released in that territory.

==== As featured artist ====
Title	Year	Album
"Lucky" (Chelsea Cutler with Alexander 23)	2020	How To Be Human
"Like That" (Gracey with Alexander 23)	2020	The Art Of Closure
"We Don't Talk Enough" (Quinn XCII with Alexander 23)	2021	Change of Scenery II
"—" denotes a release that did not chart or was not released in that territory.

=== Remixes ===
Title	Year	Original artist(s)
"late nights - Alexander 23 edit"	2019	mxmtoon
"Rare (Alexander 23 Edit)"	2020	Selena Gomez

=== Production credits ===
Year	Artist	Album	Song	Co-produced with
2019	Role Model	oh, how perfect	"that's just how it goes"	
2019	AJ Mitchell	Slow Dance	"Move On"	
2019	Sam Setton	My Dream Girl Is My Ex Now	"My Dream Girl Is My Ex Now"	
2019	Sam Setton	My Dream Girl Is My Ex Now	"Santiago"	
2019	Sam Setton	My Dream Girl Is My Ex Now	"Gum"	
2019	Sam Setton	My Dream Girl Is My Ex Now	"Wine"	
2019	Sam Setton	My Dream Girl Is My Ex Now	"Nice Kid"	
2019	Sam Setton	My Dream Girl Is My Ex Now	"Hurts So Much"	
2019	Sam Setton	My Dream Girl Is My Ex Now	"Pink Nikes"	
2019	Sam Setton	My Dream Girl Is My Ex Now	"20 Roses"	
2019	Sam Setton	My Dream Girl Is My Ex Now	"Palm Tree"	
2019	Sam Setton	My Dream Girl Is My Ex Now	"Please Don't"	
2019	Sam Setton	Non-album single	"I Never Lied 2 U"	
2019	Maude Latour	Starsick	"Plans"	
2020	Selena Gomez	Non-album single	"Rare (Alexander 23 edit)"	
2020	Noah Kahan	Non-album single	"Pride"(with mxmtoon)	
2020	mxmtoon	dawn & dusk	"used to you"	
2020	mxmtoon	dawn (the edits)	"1,2" (featuring Chloe Moriondo)	
2020	Maria Isabel	Stuck in the Sky	"A Game I Lose"	
2020	Maria Isabel	Stuck in the Sky	"Stuck in the Sky"	Brandon Jhon
2020	Max Leone	Malleable	"The Beach"	Max Leone
2021	Olivia Rodrigo	Sour	"Good 4 U"	Dan Nigro
2022	Lexi Jayde	Closer to Closure	"Drunk Text Me"	Nick Ruth
2022	David Kushner	Mr. Forgettable	"Mr. Forgettable"	
2022	renforshort	moshpit	"moshpit"	Jeff Hazin
2022	Tate McRae	I Used to Think I Could Fly	"boy x"	
2022	Tate McRae	I Used to Think I Could Fly	"what would you do"	Charlie Puth, Blake Slatkin
2023	Reneé Rapp	Everything to Everyone (Deluxe)	"Bruises"	
2023	Reneé Rapp	Everything to Everyone (Deluxe)	"Everything To Everyone (Extended Version)"	
2023	Reneé Rapp	Snow Angel	"Talk Too Much"	
2023	Reneé Rapp	Snow Angel	"I Hate Boston"	
2023	Reneé Rapp	Snow Angel	"Poison Poison"	
2023	Reneé Rapp	Snow Angel	"Gemini Moon"	
2023	Reneé Rapp	Snow Angel	"Snow Angel"	
2023	Reneé Rapp	Snow Angel	"So What Now"	Pop Wansel, Some Randoms, Isabella Sjöstrand
2023	Reneé Rapp	Snow Angel	"The Wedding Song"	Jon Bellion, Tenroc
2023	Reneé Rapp	Snow Angel	"Pretty Girls"	Petro A.P.
2023	Reneé Rapp	Snow Angel	"Tummy Hurts"	
2023	Reneé Rapp	Snow Angel	"I Wish"	
2023	Reneé Rapp	Snow Angel	"Willow"	Petro A.P.
2023	Reneé Rapp	Snow Angel	"23"	
2023	Reneé Rapp	Snow Angel Deluxe	I Do	
2023	Reneé Rapp	Snow Angel Deluxe	Swim	
2023	Reneé Rapp	Snow Angel Deluxe	Tummy Hurts feat. Coco Jones	
2023	Glaive	i care so much that i dont care at all	Pardee Urgent Care	
2023	Reneé Rapp feat. Megan Thee Stallion	Mean Girls	"Not My Fault"	Ryan Tedder, Jasper Harris, Jeff Richmond
2023	Addison Rae	AR	"It Could've Been U"	
2023	Grace Enger	Well Here We Are	"Bad Guy"	Grace Enger, Jeremy Zucker, Laufey
2023	Grace Enger	Well Here We Are	"The Neighbourhood"	Petro AP
2023	Grace Enger	Well Here We Are	"Me to You"	Grace Enger, Petro AP
2023	Grace Enger	Well Here We Are	"When It Was Over"	Grace Enger
2023	Grace Enger	Well Here We Are	"The Cut"	Grace Enger
2023	Olivia Rodrigo	Guts	"Get Him Back!"	Dan Nigro
2024	Blu DeTiger	All I Ever Want Is Everything	"You Say"	Blu DeTiger

=== Songwriting credits ===
Year	Artist	Album	Song	Co-written with
2019	Role Model	oh, how perfect	"that's just how it goes"	Tucker Pillsbury
2019	AJ Mitchell	Slow Dance	"Move On"	Aaron Frederick Mitchell Jr., Jesse Fink
2019	Maude Latour	Starsick	Starsick	Maude Latour
2019	Maude Latour	Starsick	"Plans"	Maude Latour
2020	Maria Isabel	Stuck in the Sky	"Light Your Way Home" (interlude	Brandon Jhon, Maria Severino
2020	Maria Isabel	Stuck in the Sky	"A Game I Lose"	Daniel Esguerra, Maria Severino
2020	mxmtoon	dawn & dusk	"used to you"	Maia
2020	Louis The Child	Here For Now	"Bittersweet"	Frederic Kennett, Robert Hauldren
2020	Max Leone	Malleable	"The Beach"	Max Leone
2022	Lexi Jayde	Closer to Closure	"Drunk Text Me"	Alexis Burnett, Cate Downing, Nick Ruth
2022	David Kushner	Mr. Forgettable	"Mr. Forgettable"	David Kushner
2022	renforshort	moshpit	"moshpit"	Lauren Isenberg, Jeff Hazin
2022	Tate McRae	i used to think i could fly	"boy x"	Tate McRae
2022	Tate McRae	i used to think i could fly	"what would you do"	Charlie Puth, Blake Slatkin, Tate McRae
2023	Reneé Rapp	Everything to Everyone	"Bruises"	Reneé Rapp, Cleo Tighe, Isabella Sjostrand, Elie Rizk
2023	Reneé Rapp	Everything to Everyone	”Everything to Everyone - extended version”	Reneé Rapp, Sarah Aarons, Cirkut
2023	Reneé Rapp	Snow Angel	”Snow Angel”	Reneé Rapp
2023	Reneé Rapp	Snow Angel	"Talk Too Much"	
2023	Reneé Rapp	Snow Angel	"I Hate Boston"	
2023	Reneé Rapp	Snow Angel	"Poison Poison"	
2023	Reneé Rapp	Snow Angel	"Gemini Moon"	
2023	Reneé Rapp	Snow Angel	"So What Now"	
2023	Reneé Rapp	Snow Angel	"The Wedding Song"	
2023	Reneé Rapp	Snow Angel	"Pretty Girls"	
2023	Reneé Rapp	Snow Angel	"Tummy Hurts"	
2023	Reneé Rapp	Snow Angel	"I Wish"	
2023	Reneé Rapp	Snow Angel	"Willow"	
2023	Reneé Rapp	Snow Angel	"23"	
2023	Reneé Rapp	Snow Angel (Deluxe)	"I Do"	
2023	Reneé Rapp	Snow Angel (Deluxe)	"Swim"	
2023	Reneé Rapp	Snow Angel (Deluxe)	"Tummy Hurts" (feat. Coco Jones)	
2023	Reneé Rapp featuring Megan Thee Stallion	Mean Girls	"Not My Fault"	Reneé Rapp, Megan Thee Stallion, Ryan Tedder, Billy Walsh, Jasper Harris, Jeff Richmond, Nell Benjamin
2023	Jeremy Zucker	OK	"OK"	Jeremy Zucker, Ben Ash, Artemas Diamandis
2023	Addison Rae	AR	"It Could’ve Been U"	Addison Easterling, Tia Scola
2023	Grace Enger	Well Here We Are	"The Neighbourhood"	Grace Enger, Dough Schadt
2023	Grace Enger	Well Here We Are	"When It Was Over"	Grace Enger
2024	Blu DeTiger	All I Ever Want Is Everything	"You Say"	Kyle Shearer, Nate Campany, Blu DeTiger
2025	Joe Jonas	Music for People Who Believe in Love	"Parachute"	Joe Jonas, Justin Tranter, Paris Carney
2025	Joe Jonas	Music for People Who Believe in Love	"Only Love"	Joe Jonas, Justin Tranter, Beau Nox
2025	Joe Jonas	Music for People Who Believe in Love	"What We Are" (feat. Luísa Sonza)	Joe Jonas, Luísa Sonza, James Ghaleb
2025	Joe Jonas	Music for People Who Believe in Love	"Constellation"	Joe Jonas, James Ghaleb

== Awards and nominations ==
Year	Nominee / work	Award	Result	Ref.
2022	Sour	Grammy Award for Album of the Year	Nominated	

== Tours ==
=== Headlining ===
- Oh No, Not A Tour! (2021)
- Aftershock Tour (2022)

=== Opening act ===
- Alec Benjamin - Outrunning Karma Tour (2019)
- Omar Apollo - The Speed of Sound Tour (2019)
- John Mayer - SOB Rock Tour (2022)
- AJR - OK Orchestra Tour (2022)
- Renee Rapp - Snow Hard Feelings Tour (2023)
