= Mean Girls (2024 soundtrack) =

Soundtrack album by various artists

Mean Girls (Music from the Motion Picture)

Soundtrack album by various artists
- Released: January 12, 2024
- Studio: Daxxit Sound Studios; The DiMenna Center
- Genre: Pop
- Length: 34:19
- Label: Interscope
- Producer: Tina Fey; Jeff Richmond; Nell Benjamin

Mean Girls chronology
Mean Girls (Original Broadway Cast Recording) (2018)	Mean Girls (Music from the Motion Picture) (2024)

Singles from Mean Girls
- 1. "Not My Fault" Released: December 15, 2023; 2. "World Burn" Released: January 8, 2024

Mean Girls (Music from the Motion Picture) is the soundtrack album to the 2024 film adaptation of the Broadway musical of the same name. The album was released on January 12, 2024, by Interscope Records.

The soundtrack features twelve musical numbers from the film, which were reworked by Jeff Richmond and Nell Benjamin, the stage musical's original composer and lyricist, respectively. It also includes a new musical number written for the adaptation by Richmond, Benjamin, Reneé Rapp, and Michael Pollack.

== Background ==
In January 2020, Tina Fey stated that a film adaptation of the Mean Girls stage musical, which is based on Mark Waters' 2004 comedy film, was in active development.

In January 2023, it was announced that Jeff Richmond and Nell Benjamin returned to rework their songs from the stage musical for the film adaptation, while Richmond also composed the film's score. Fourteen songs from the stage musical were cut for the film to avoid issues with tonality and make it less-stagy, including "Where Do You Belong?", "Fearless", "Stop", "Whose House Is This?", "More Is Better", and "Do this Thing", along with the reprises of "Stupid with Love", and "A Cautionary Tale".

Reneé Rapp joined Richmond and Benjamin to write a new musical number for Cady, titled "What If's", to replace "It Roars", the introductory song for the character in the stage version. Rapp also co-wrote "Not My Fault", performed by her and American rapper Megan Thee Stallion, which is not used as a musical number in the film, but plays during the end credits scene. The song was released as a single on December 15, 2023. A music video was released on January 5, 2024. It was followed by "World Burn", which was released as a promotional single on January 8, 2024.

== Release ==
The soundtrack album was made available to pre-save and pre-order on January 3, 2024, and was released digitally on January 12 by Interscope Records. A CD edition was released on February 23, 2024, and was followed by a pink colored LP on April 19.

A deluxe edition, titled Bonus Track Version, was released on February 20, 2024.

== Track listing ==
All songs are composed by Jeff Richmond, with lyrics written by Nell Benjamin, except where noted.

Mean Girls (Music from the Motion Picture) track listing
No.	Title	Lyrics	Performer(s)	Length
1.	"A Cautionary Tale"		Auliʻi Cravalho and Jaquel Spivey	1:08
2.	"What Ifs"	Benjamin; Reneé Rapp; Michael Pollack	Angourie Rice	1:58
3.	"Meet the Plastics"		Reneé Rapp	1:29
4.	"Stupid with Love"		Rice and the cast	2:07
5.	"Apex Predator"		Cravalho and Spivey	3:07
6.	"What's Wrong with Me?"		Bebe Wood	1:39
7.	"Sexy"		Avantika	3:03
8.	"Someone Gets Hurt"		Rapp	3:02
9.	"Revenge Party"		Cravalho, Spivey, Rice, Tim Meadows, and the cast	4:45
10.	"World Burn"		Rapp and the cast	3:35
11.	"I'd Rather Be Me"		Cravalho and the cast	2:56
12.	"I See Stars"		Rice and the cast	2:40
13.	"Not My Fault"	Alexander 23; Billy Walsh; Jasper Harris; Richmond; Megan Pete; Benjamin; Rapp; Ryan Tedder	Rapp and Megan Thee Stallion	2:50
Total length:				34:19

Bonus Track Version bonus tracks
No.	Title	Lyrics	Performer(s)	Length
14.	"Laissez Moi Tout (iCarly Theme Song)"	Michael Corcoran	Jaquel Spivey	1:21
15.	"Rockin’ Around the Pole Again"		Nahscha	2:27
16.	"Someone Gets Hurt (Reprise)"		Auliʻi Cravalho (Note: Angourie Rice and Jaquel Spivey's dialogues are featured in "Someone Gets Hurt (Reprise)", however, they are uncredited.)	0:50
17.	"Stupid with Love (Reprise)"		Angourie Rice and the cast	2:05
18.	"Let Me Go"	Jeff Richmond	Nahscha	1:56
Total length:				43:00

== Personnel ==
Cast

- Auliʻi Cravalho – vocals (tracks 1, 5, 9)
- Jaquel Spivey – vocals (tracks 1, 5, 9)
- Angourie Rice – vocals (tracks 2, 4, 9, 11, 12)
- Reneé Rapp – vocals (tracks 3, 8, 10, 13)
- Bebe Wood – vocals (track 6)
- Avantika – vocals (track 7)
- Tim Meadows – vocals (track 9)

Musicians

- Hanan Rubinstein – drums, guitar, percussion (tracks 1–5, 7–12); keyboards (3–12), synthesizer (3, 4, 7–12), bass (3, 8, 10–12), background vocals (4), organ (9, 10, 12), piano (9)
- Jack Grabow – keyboards (tracks 1–7, 9–12); drums, percussion (1–5, 7, 9–12), synth bass (1), guitar (2, 4, 9, 11, 12), synthesizer (3, 4, 11), background vocals (4), bass (11)
- Jeff Richmond – percussion (tracks 1–4, 9, 10, 12), keyboards (2–12), synthesizer (2–4), programming (5–12)
- John Beal – bass (tracks 2–12)
- Peter Donovan – bass (tracks 2–12)
- Adele Stein – cello (tracks 2–12)
- Deb Assael – cello (tracks 2–12)
- Laura Bontrager – cello (tracks 2–12)
- Mairi Dorman – cello (tracks 2–12)
- Brandon Wright – saxophone (tracks 2–12)
- Jonathan Arons – trombone (tracks 2–12)
- Bradley Mason – trumpet (tracks 2–12)
- Andrew Griffin – viola (tracks 2–12)
- Angela Pickett – viola (tracks 2–12)
- Celia Hatton – viola (tracks 2–12)
- Jen Herman – viola (tracks 2–12)
- Molly Goldman – viola (tracks 2–12)
- Todd Low – viola (tracks 2–12)
- Adda Kridler – violin (tracks 2–12)
- Anna Luce – violin (tracks 2–12)
- Chelsea Smith – violin (tracks 2–12)
- Erin Mayland – violin (tracks 2–12)
- Hiroko Taguchi – violin (tracks 2–12)
- Jonny Dinklage – violin (tracks 2–12)
- Justin Smith – violin (tracks 2–12)
- Kristina Gitterman – violin (tracks 2–12)
- Laura Sahin – violin (tracks 2–12)
- Max Moston – violin (tracks 2–12)
- Monica Davis – violin (tracks 2–12)
- Orlando Wells – violin (tracks 2–12)
- Phil Payton – violin (tracks 2–12)
- Robert Zubrycki – violin (tracks 2–12)
- Robin Zeh – violin (tracks 2–12)
- Sarah Zun – violin (tracks 2–12)
- Sylvia d'Avanzo – violin (tracks 2–12)
- Tallie Brunfelt – violin (tracks 2–12)
- Judy Lee – French horn (tracks 2, 3, 7–12)
- Julie Pacheco – clarinet, flute (tracks 2, 5, 6, 9, 11)
- Steve Kenyon – clarinet, flute (tracks 2, 5, 6, 9, 11)
- Ben Roseberry – background vocals (tracks 4, 9–12)
- Brandi Thompson – background vocals (tracks 4, 9–12)
- Francesca Castro – background vocals (tracks 4, 9–12)
- Janna Graham – background vocals (tracks 4, 9–12)
- Krystina Alabado – background vocals (tracks 4, 9–12)
- Kyle Brier – background vocals (tracks 4, 9–12)
- Marissa Rosen – background vocals (tracks 4, 9–12)
- Mary-Mitchell Campbell – background vocals (tracks 4, 9–12)
- Matilde Heckler – background vocals (tracks 4, 9–12)
- Nahscha – background vocals (tracks 4, 9–12)
- Shane Golden – background vocals (tracks 4, 9–12)
- Soona Lee-Tolley – background vocals (tracks 4, 9–12)
- Tamika Lawrence – background vocals (tracks 4, 9–12)
- Troy Iwata – background vocals (tracks 4, 9–12)
- Zach Piser – background vocals (tracks 4, 9–12)
- Charles Haynes – drums (tracks 5, 11, 12)
- Nadav Lavie – upright bass (tracks 5, 7, 9)
- Kyle Brier – guitar (tracks 6, 12), ukulele (6)
- Adam Blackstone – bass (tracks 7, 9)
- Roberto Robinson – drums (tracks 8, 9)
- John Shiffman – drums (track 10)
- Alexander 23 – background vocals, bass, drums, guitar, programming, synthesizer (track 13)
- Ryan Tedder – background vocals, bass, drums, guitar, programming, synthesizer (track 13)
- Jasper Harris – Rhodes (track 13)
- Megan Thee Stallion – vocals (track 13)

Technical

- Hanan Rubinstein – production (tracks 1–12)
- Jack Grabow – production (tracks 1–12)
- Jeff Richmond – production (track 13)
- Alexander 23 – production (track 13)
- Jasper Harris – production (track 13)
- Ryan Tedder – production (track 13)
- Zach Pereyra – mastering
- Manny Marroquin – mixing
- Chris Galland – mix engineering

== Charts ==
Weekly chart performance for Mean Girls
Chart (2024)	Peak position
Australian Albums (ARIA)	97
Dutch Albums (Album Top 100)	99
UK Compilation Albums (OCC)	10
UK Soundtrack Albums (OCC)	3
US Billboard 200	124

== Release history ==
Release history and formats for Mean Girls (Music from the Motion Picture)
Region	Date	Format(s)	Edition(s)	Label(s)	Ref.
Various	January 12, 2024	Digital download; streaming	Standard	Interscope	
Various	February 20, 2024	Digital download; streaming	Bonus Track Version	Interscope	
Various	February 23, 2024	CD	Standard	Interscope	
Various	April 19, 2024	LP	Standard; Pink colored disc	Interscope	

== See also ==
- Mean Girls (2004 soundtrack)
