= Ice Age: Boiling Point =

Upcoming animated film

- Theatrical release poster
- Directed by: John C. Donkin
- Produced by: Lori Forte; Patrick Worlock
- Starring: Ray Romano; Denis Leary; John Leguizamo; Simon Pegg; Queen Latifah
- Music by: Batu Sener
- Production companies: 20th Century Animation
- Distributed by: 20th Century Studios
- Release date: February 5, 2027
- Country: United States
- Language: English

Ice Age: Boiling Point is an upcoming American animated adventure comedy film directed by John C. Donkin. Produced by 20th Century Animation, it is the sixth main installment in the Ice Age film series following Ice Age: Collision Course (2016), and the seventh installment overall. The film features Ray Romano, Denis Leary, John Leguizamo, Simon Pegg, and Queen Latifah reprising their roles from the previous films. It will be the first theatrical Ice Age film not produced by Blue Sky Studios, which closed in April 2021.

Plans for a new Ice Age film were announced in June 2016, when co-director Galen T. Chu stated that there were some ideas for a sixth main installment, though Bustle noted that the chances of a sixth entry were relatively high but would depend on the box office performance of Collision Course. While the film ultimately fell short of financial expectations, a sequel was eventually revealed to be in development by Leguizamo in September 2024, with production beginning that November and the official title being announced in August 2025.

Ice Age: Boiling Point is scheduled to be released in the United States by 20th Century Studios on February 5, 2027.

== Premise ==
Ice Age: Boiling Point is a dinosaur-and-lava-filled madcap adventure that takes Manny, Sid, Diego, Ellie, Buck, acorn-obsessed Scrat – this time joined by Baby Scrat and the enormous Jurassic Scrat – and the rest of the herd to visit never before-seen corners of the treacherous Lost World.

— 20th Century Studios

== Voice cast ==
- Ray Romano as Manny, a male woolly mammoth and the leader of the Herd
- Denis Leary as Diego, a smilodon and the co-leader of the Herd
- John Leguizamo as Sid, a ground sloth and the founder of the Herd
- Simon Pegg as Buck Wild, a one-eyed weasel and dinosaur hunter
- Queen Latifah as Ellie, a female woolly mammoth, Manny's wife, and a member of the Herd
- Ashley Park as Zee, a zorilla from the Lost World and Buck's ally. Park replaces Justina Machado, who previously voiced her in The Ice Age Adventures of Buck Wild.
- Vincent Tong and Josh Peck as Crash and Eddie, Ellie's adoptive possum brothers. Tong reprises his role from The Ice Age Adventures of Buck Wild and replaces Seann William Scott, who voiced Crash in the previous four main films.
- Adam DeVine as Julian, husband of Peaches.
- Coco Jones as Peaches, daughter of Manny and Ellie, and wife of Julian. Jones replaces Keke Palmer, who voiced Peaches in the previous Ice Age films.
- Chris Wedge as Scrat
- Kari Wahlgren as Baby Scrat
- Dee Bradley Baker as Jurassic Scrat
- Eduardo Franco as Bodi
- James Austin Johnson as Clarence the Sprout Master

== Production ==
On the possibility of a potential sequel to Ice Age: Collision Course in June 2016, co-director Galen T. Chu said that there were some ideas for the seventh installment of the Ice Age film series. Blue Sky Studios shut down on April 10, 2021 and consequently, many of their upcoming projects were cancelled. In February 2022, producer Lori Forte discussed the possibility of a sequel while promoting The Ice Age Adventures of Buck Wild, saying, "I think it's a little premature. We hope that people will respond to this, and that will promote us to be able to do another movie. If the audiences want it, we've got plenty of ideas. There's no end to ideas and adventures and characters, so we're ready if they're ready."

In September 2024, John Leguizamo, the voice of Sid in the Ice Age films, revealed that the seventh film was in development. By November 2024, during the D23 fan event in Brazil, the film was officially announced to be in production with Ray Romano, Leguizamo, Denis Leary, Simon Pegg, and Queen Latifah reprising their roles from the previous films. In August 2025, it was announced that the film had been titled Ice Age: Boiling Point. In October 2025, Seann William Scott, the voice of Crash from the previous films, stated in an interview with Aeron Mer Eclarinal from The Direct that he did not expect his character to appear in the film and believed he would be killed off because "the movie doesn't need two little opossums". Crash and Eddie ultimately appeared in the teaser trailer, while it was revealed in November 2026 that Scott had been recast. In June 2026, former Blue Sky producer John C. Donkin, who previously directed The Ice Age Adventures of Buck Wild, was also officially announced as the director of the film.

=== Animation ===
After the release of the film's teaser trailer, it was officially announced that Bardel Entertainment would provide the film's animation after previously doing so for The Ice Age Adventures of Buck Wild.

=== Music ===
In September 2026, Batu Sener was announced to be composing the film after previously composing the scores of The Ice Age Adventures of Buck Wild and Ice Age: Scrat Tales.

== Marketing ==
Ice Age: Boiling Point had a dedicated section at the Walt Disney Studios panel at CinemaCon 2026. Most of the film's lead actors (Ray Romano, Denis Leary and Queen Latifah) were present at the event to talk about the film. The film's opening scene, featuring Scrat and Baby Scrat escaping a volcanic eruption, was shown. Patrick Worlock, who was assistant production manager on Ice Age: The Meltdown, was also announced to be producing the film alongside Forte.

The teaser trailer was released on June 4, 2026. Contrary to Seann William Scott's previous statement that Crash and Eddie were not expected to appear in the film, both characters are featured in the teaser along with Scrat and Baby Scrat. Additional panel sections for the film were held at D23: The Ultimate Disney Fan Event on August 14, 2026, and at Comic-Con Málaga on October 3, 2026.

The first official trailer for the film was released on November 19, 2026, ahead of the release of Walt Disney Animation Studios' Hexed. Along with the trailer came a new theatrical poster and the reveal of further names in the cast, with Josh Peck, Chris Wedge and Adam DeVine reprising their roles from the previous films, Vincent Tong and Kari Wahlgren reprising their roles from other Ice Age media and Ashley Park, Coco Jones, Dee Bradley Baker, Eduardo Franco and James Austin Johnson joining the cast.

== Release ==
Ice Age: Boiling Point is scheduled to be released theatrically in RealD 3D in the United States on February 5, 2027. The film's original release date was December 18, 2026, but after Avengers: Doomsday was delayed to that date in May 2025, Boiling Point was expected to be moved to a new release date in the following weeks to avoid competition with Doomsday and Dune: Part Three. The new release date was eventually announced along with the film's new title at Destination D23, on August 30, 2025.
