= Slaggert =

Slaggert is a surname. Notable people with the surname include:

- Landon Slaggert (born 2002), American ice hockey player
- Mitchell Slaggert (fl. from 2017), American actor and model
