= Ilia Isorelýs Paulino =

American actress

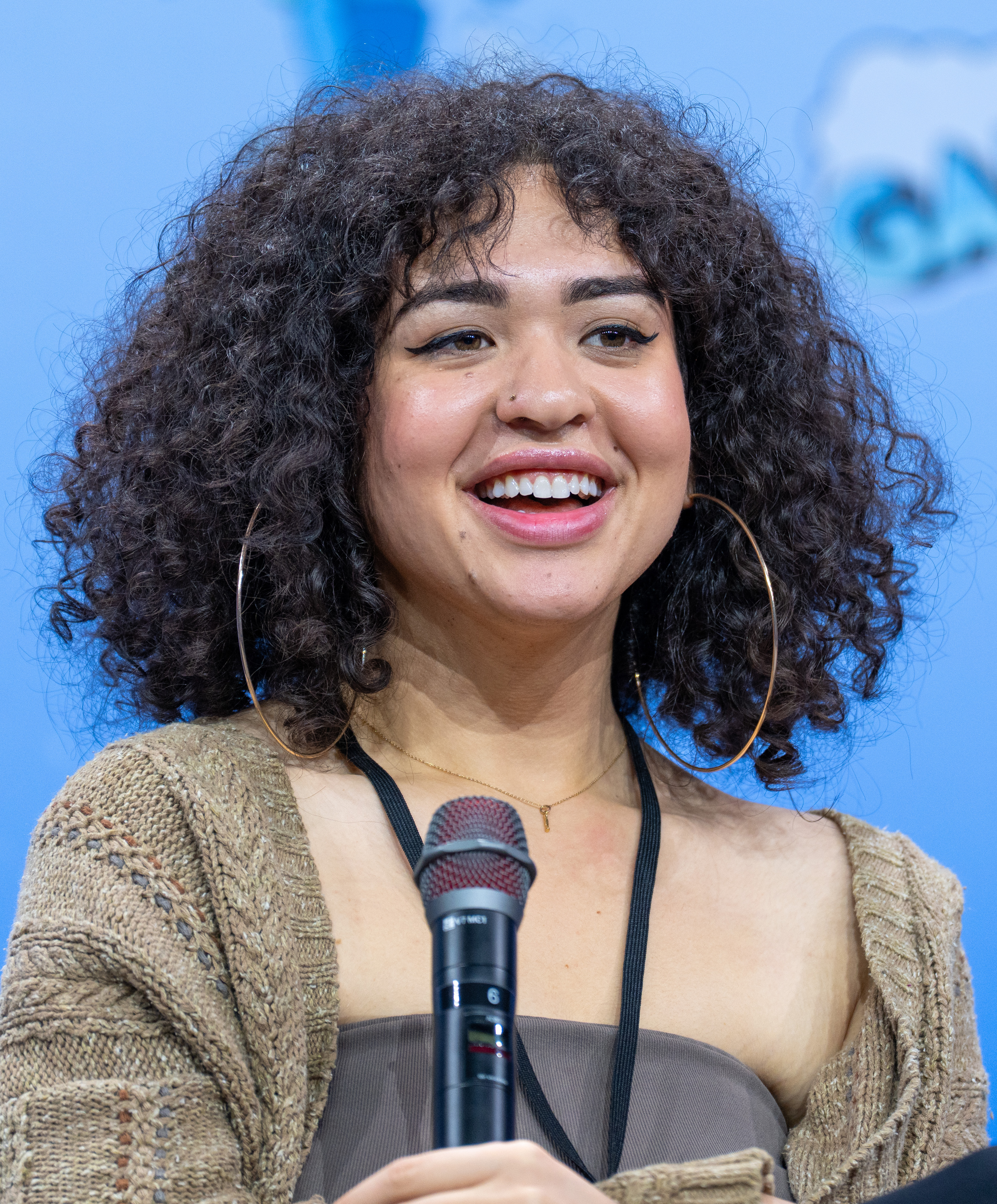
- Paulino at GalaxyCon Oklahoma City in 2025
- Born: March 26, 1995 (age 31); Lawrence, Massachusetts, U.S.
- Citizenship: United States; Dominican Republic
- Education: DeSales University (BA); Yale University (MFA)
- Occupations: Actress; producer
- Years active: 2013–present

Ilia Isorelýs Paulino (born March 26, 1995) is an American actress, best known for her role as Lila Flores on The Sex Lives of College Girls (2021) and Alvida in Netflix's live adaptation of One Piece (2023).

== Early life and education ==
Paulino was born in Lawrence, Massachusetts on March 26, 1995 to Dominican parents. She has a younger sister, Noemi, who is also an actress. Growing up speaking mostly Spanish, Paulino described the beginning of her path to acting as 'complicated' due to her strong accent. At age 13, she and a friend auditioned for a theatre version of Beauty and the Beast, with Paulino getting the main role as the Beast.

In 2013 Paulino acted in the short movie Innovation before graduating from Central Catholic High School in Lawrence. Later she studied musical theatre at DeSales University in Center Valley, Pennsylvania and graduated from Yale School of Drama in 2020.

== Career ==
In 2021, she appeared in a supporting role in the featured film production Queenpins. Starting that same year, Paulino began playing the role of Lila Flores in the HBO Max television series The Sex Lives of College Girls, and would do so for the next three seasons before its cancellation in 2025. In early March 2022, it was announced that Paulino would play pirate captain Alvida in Netflix's One Piece live-action adaptation, a role for which she shed a significant amount of weight between the first and second season.

On November 2023, Paulino founded Cusp of Rebirth Productions alongside Donato Fatuesi e Logan Ellis.

== Filmography ==
=== Film ===
Key
†	Denotes films that have not yet been released

Year	Title	Role	Notes
2013	Innovation	Brenda	Short film
2021	Queenpins	Rosa	
2022	Me Time	Thelma	
2023	Family Switch	Kara	
2024	Saving Bikini Bottom: The Sandy Cheeks Movie	Phoebe	
2024	Spit Me Out	Bev	Short film

=== Television ===
Year	Title	Role	Notes
2021–2025	The Sex Lives of College Girls	Lila	Main role
2023–present	One Piece	Alvida	3 episodes
