= Josie Trinidad =

American storyboard artist

- Born: Los Angeles, California, U.S.
- Education: University of California, Los Angeles (B.A.); California Institute of the Arts (BFA)
- Occupations: Storyboard artist; director; screenwriter; voice actress
- Employer: Walt Disney Animation Studios (2004–present)
- Children: 1

Josie Trinidad is an American storyboard artist, voice actress, screenwriter and director best known for her work at Walt Disney Animation Studios. She joined Disney in 2004, and worked on The Princess and the Frog (2009), Tangled (2010), and Wreck-It Ralph (2012). She served as the co-head of story on Zootopia (2016) and was the head of story on Ralph Breaks the Internet (2018). She made her directorial debut with the television series Zootopia+.

== Early life ==
Josie Trinidad was born to Filipino immigrant parents in Los Angeles, California. Her father, a doctor, was born in Laguna, while her mother hailed from Ilocos Norte and worked as a nurse. During her early years, she frequently stayed in contact with her Filipino relatives. She explained, "I come home a lot. I still have couple of aunts in Mandaluyong, in San Juan and in Las Piñas. We are a very close family and we see each other often."

At eleven years old, Trinidad watched Robin Hood (1973) on videocassette and repeatedly paused the film so she could examine it frame by frame. "I realized, 'Oh my, those are drawings,'" she recalled. "'They're beautiful, hand-drawn images, and someone is behind that!' I was 11 years old and knew at that moment I wanted to be an animator." However, she admitted she grew up in a family that perceived art as more of a hobby than a viable career. Trinidad nevertheless stated: "What I did was I worked really hard and I made sure that I tried. At least I could say I tried to make it into animation. If it worked, great. If it didn't work, then maybe I was meant to do something else. But I never gave up."

A graduate of Adolfo Camarillo High School, Trinidad attended University of California, Los Angeles (UCLA), majoring in English literature and fine arts, and studied character animation at California Institute of the Arts (CalArts). After her graduation, she worked as an illustrator for the toy company MGA Entertainment and Klasky Csupo on animated commercials.

== Career ==
In 2004, Trinidad was hired by Walt Disney Animation Studios (then known as Walt Disney Feature Animation) as a story apprentice. She was enrolled in a six-month training program, where she was given storyboard tests assigned by mentors. There, she was the only person of Asian descent in the apprentice program. After six months had passed, she stated, "They decided where you were going to go, if they were going to keep you or not. And they decided to put me on a film." Her first film project was the 2009 film The Princess and the Frog. During production, Trinidad remembered: "I was the only female story artist with the 12 men in that room." However, her experience with the film's directors Ron Clements and John Musker was pleasant, stating: "They threw me in the deep end ... They were really great." She next worked on Tangled (2010) and Wreck-It Ralph (2012).

In Zootopia, Trinidad was appointed as the film's co-head of story. In that position, she held pitch meetings with a team of 12 to 15 story artists and hosted a smaller group during editorial meetings. After she read an early draft of the script, Trinidad connected with the main character Judy Hopps and found a kinship with the character's urban relocation when she was a college student. For visual research, the filmmakers sent Trinidad to the Philippines to gather inspiration for the film. There, she visited the De La Salle–College of Saint Benilde and the animation studio Toon City in Manila. By this point, Trinidad had stated the story team had become more racially diverse, with nearly half of the team being female. Zootopia was awarded the 2017 Academy Award for Best Animated Feature.

Trinidad was tapped as the film's head of story for the 2018 sequel Ralph Breaks the Internet. In an interview, she stated, "We wanted the world of the Internet to feel authentic, like how we all use it today, but to mix it up with our own kind of fun, which were websites [...] The trick is getting something familiar then turning it in something never seen before. The biggest challenge though, was trying to hone that big idea down." Despite this, she has reflected that the overall story process for an animated film is "not very glamorous," but nevertheless is very collaborative.

In December 2020, it was announced that a spin-off series titled Zootopia+ was in development for streaming on Disney+. Trent Correy had pitched the series as one of three pitches for potential Disney+ series. Trinidad, who had served as a story artist on the 2016 film, was originally set to direct only two episodes for the series. However, her excitement led to her co-directing the entire series alongside Correy. The series began streaming on November 9, 2022.

In August 2025, at the Destination D23 convention, it was announced that Trinidad and Jason Hand were directing an original animated feature titled Hexed. At CinemaCon 2026, the revised story was announced to focus on Billie, an impulsive teenage girl, who discovers magical abilities that transport her from suburbia into a witch realm called Hexe. Forced to team up with her cautious mother, Alice, the two uncover family secrets that could reshape the world of witches. It was also announced at the event that Fawn Veerasunthorn would now be directing the film with Hand, but Trinidad would still be present as the co-director of the film.

== Personal life ==
Trinidad lives in Los Angeles with her son.

== Filmography ==
=== Films ===
Year	Title	Director	Story by	Story Supervisor	Story Artist	Voice role	Notes
2009	The Princess and the Frog	No	No	No	Yes	No	
2010	Tangled	No	No	No	Yes	No	
2012	Wreck-It Ralph	No	No	No	Yes	Yes	Jubileena Bing Bing
2014	Big Hero 6	No	No	No	Yes	Yes	Additional voices
2016	Zootopia	No	Yes	Head of story	Yes	Yes	Landlady
2018	Ralph Breaks the Internet	No	Yes	Head of story	Yes	Yes	Additional voices
2019	Frozen II	No	No	No	Yes	No	
2021	Raya and the Last Dragon	No	No	No	Additional	No	
2026	Hexed	Co-Director	Yes	TBA	TBA	TBA	(Note: The film's initial announcement in 2025 listed Trinidad as director alongside Jason Hand, but at CinemaCon 2026, it was announced that Fawn Veerasunthorn would now be directing the film alongside Hand, with Trinidad still on board as co-director.)

=== Shorts ===
Year	Title	Story Writer	Story Artist	Notes
2007	How to Hook Up Your Home Theater	Additional story	Yes	
2011	The Ballad of Nessie	Yes	Yes	

=== Television series ===
Year	Title	Director	Story Writer	Notes
2022	Zootopia+	Yes	Yes	6 episodes
