= Wish Upon =

2017 American horror film

- Theatrical release poster
- Directed by: John R. Leonetti
- Written by: Barbara Marshall
- Produced by: Sherryl Clark
- Starring: Joey King; Ki Hong Lee; Sydney Park; Elisabeth Rohm; Ryan Phillippe
- Cinematography: Michael Galbraith
- Edited by: Peck Prior
- Music by: Tomandandy
- Production company: Busted Shark Productions
- Distributed by: Broad Green Pictures; Orion Pictures
- Release date: July 14, 2017
- Running time: 90 minutes (theatrical); 91 minutes (unrated)
- Country: United States
- Language: English
- Budget: $12 million
- Box office: $23.5 million

Wish Upon is a 2017 American supernatural horror film, directed by John R. Leonetti, written by Barbara Marshall, and starring Joey King, Ki Hong Lee, Sydney Park, Shannon Purser, Sherilyn Fenn, Elisabeth Rohm, and Ryan Phillippe. The film follows a teenage girl who is given a magic music box that grants seven wishes, but kills someone close to her each time it does.

The film was theatrically released on July 14, 2017, by Broad Green Pictures and Orion Pictures. It received negative reviews from critics and grossed $23.5 million worldwide against a $12 million budget.

== Plot ==
Clare Shannon, a seventeen-year-old high school outcast, is haunted by the memory of her mother's suicide that she witnessed as a young child.

Her father, Jonathan, a hoarder and dumpster diver, finds a Chinese music box and gives it to Clare. She deciphers one of the inscriptions on the box as "Seven Wishes", and absentmindedly wishes for Darcie, her school bully, to "rot", at which point Darcie develops necrotizing fasciitis. That same day, Clare's dog Max dies. Clare deduces the box grants wishes.

Clare makes a second wish that a popular boy named Paul would fall madly in love with her and he does (so much he starts to stalk her). That same night, her wealthy great-uncle dies. Hearing this, Clare wishes to be in his will, which leaves everything to her. Consequently, their neighbor Mrs. Deluca dies.

Clare enlists the help of classmate Ryan Hui to translate the symbols on the box. His cousin Gina is able to decipher that each of the seven wishes comes with consequences and the box belonged to a Chinese woman named Lu Mei. During a 1910 outbreak of bubonic plague in China, Mei's family was forcibly quarantined in a railroad car where all but Mei died of starvation. Mei prayed for revenge and offered up her family's only valuable heirloom, the music box, as a sacrifice. A demonic Yaoguai spirit answered her prayer, cursing the box. After using the box to get her revenge, Mei committed suicide.

Clare makes a fourth wish that her father will stop being so embarrassing; he stops dumpster diving and starts playing the saxophone again. Gina learns the meaning of the final phrase on the box: "When the music ends, the blood price is paid." Before she can warn Ryan, she is impaled on a statue in her loft and dies. After Ryan finds Gina's body, he angrily confronts Clare.

Despite now knowing about the "blood price", Clare is in denial and makes a fifth wish to be the most popular girl in school. She is soon unhappy with the loss of her relationship with her best friends, Meredith and June, and her constant nightmares. She breaks up with Paul after discovering he has been stalking her and sneaking into her house at night. Meredith dies when the elevator she is in plummets 30 floors.

Ryan reveals that after the seventh wish, the Yaoguai will claim the soul of the box's owner and all previous owners died tragically. The box cannot be destroyed so Clare hides it in an air vent. Paul breaks into her house and threatens her, unable to accept the end of their relationship. He attempts suicide and is taken away in an ambulance. June steals the box, knowing Clare will not get rid of it. Per the rules of the box, Clare loses everything she'd wished for and returns to her previous existence, miserable. Addicted to the power, she wrestles the box back from June, frustrating Ryan, who blames her for the string of deaths. Her sixth wish is that her mother never committed suicide and her reality changes, with her mother now alive and two younger sisters who did not previously exist.

While rummaging through her mother's paintings, Clare finds a painting of the music box, discovering that her mother was a previous owner, which led to her suicide. She hysterically runs to protect her father but is too late; her father is decapitated by a running chainsaw. Frantic, Clare makes her seventh wish – to go back to the morning her father found the box.

That morning, Clare finds the box moments before her father, preventing the tragic sequence of events. At school, she asks Ryan to bury the box for her and kisses him. However, she is immediately killed when she's hit by Darcie's car, the Yaoguai having claimed her soul just like her mother.

In a mid-credits scene, Ryan prepares to bury the music box, but becomes intrigued by the inscription about the seven wishes.

== Cast ==
- Joey King as Clare Shannon, a high school outcast
  - Raegan Revord as Young Clare
- Ki Hong Lee as Ryan Hui
- Sydney Park as Meredith McNeil
- Shannon Purser as June Acosta
- Sherilyn Fenn as Mrs. Deluca
- Elisabeth Rohm as Johanna Shannon
- Ryan Phillippe as Jonathan Shannon, Clare's father who works as a dumpster diver
- Kevin Hanchard as Carl Morris
- Mitchell Slaggert as Paul Middlebrook
- Josephine Langford as Darcie Chapman, Clare's bully
- Alice Lee as Gina
- Victor Sutton as Uncle August

In addition, Jerry O'Connell has an uncredited cameo as a previous owner of the music box.

== Themes ==
Director John R. Leonetti summarized Wish Upon as different from similar "The Monkey's Paw"-esque stories for the depth of the character Clare, particularly her tough childhood and the inability to stop using the music box even as she realizes what it really does.

== Production ==
The film is loosely based on W. W. Jacobs' short story The Monkey's Paw. The film's screenplay was voted to the 2015 Black List. Catherine Hardwicke was originally planned to direct the film, but she later was removed from the project. Afterward, producer Sherryl Clark sent a draft of the script to John R. Leonetti; he explained that while he did enjoy the script, "I didn't completely jump on at first because I had other things going on." However, another draft sent by Clark four months later caught his eye, and he took on directing duties from there. While most of the contents of the original drafts were seen in the final cut, there were alterations. A sequence where Carl almost gets hit by a truck, which referenced Billy Hitchcock's death in Final Destination (2000), was removed as the filmmakers ultimately didn't want to make a Final Destination-esque product. During filming, the scene of Jonathan in his car with a flat tire was pulled "right out of our ass" to serve as a diversion to Meredith's elevator death.

On July 27, 2016, it was announced that Wish Upon would be directed by John R. Leonetti. The film is produced by Sherryl Clark from her production company, Busted Shark Productions, and written by Barbara Marshall. In August 2016, Joey King was cast in the film's lead role, and on November 9, 2016, Ki Hong Lee was announced to have also joined. King was Leonetti's first choice for Clare Shannon, as the two previously worked together on The Conjuring (2013); and the director wanted to feature Shannon Purser in the film after seeing her in Stranger Things. The film began production in November 2016 in Toronto. Shot on an Arri Alexa at 3.4K resolution, Wish Upon was directed by Leonetti to look natural, departing from the stylized visual aesthetics of other horror films.

== Release ==
=== Theatrical ===
The film's teaser trailer was released on February 9, 2017. The first trailer debuted on March 22, 2017, and the second trailer was released on May 22, 2017. Wish Upon was released in theaters on July 14, 2017, in the U.S., and July 28, 2017, in the U.K.

=== Home video ===
Wish Upon was released on DVD and Blu-ray in the United States on October 10, 2017. The Blu-ray also includes the director's Unrated Cut of the movie which is one minute longer and favoured by the director.

=== Marketing ===
Broad Green Pictures granted seven fan wishes submitted via the film's official website.

== Reception ==
=== Box office ===
Wish Upon grossed $14.3 million in the United States and Canada, and $9.2 million in other territories, for a worldwide total of $23.5 million, against a production budget of $12 million.

In North America, Wish Upon was released alongside the opening of War for the Planet of the Apes, as well as the wide expansion of The Big Sick, and was projected to gross $8–10 million from 2,100 theaters in its opening weekend. It made $376,000 from Thursday night previews at 1,659 theaters and $2.3 million on its first day. It went on to debut to $5.5 million for its opening weekend, finishing seventh at the box office.

=== Critical response ===
On the review aggregator website Rotten Tomatoes, 20% of 91 critics' reviews are positive, with an average rating of 4.0/10. The website's consensus reads: "Wish Upon is neither scary nor original, but its fundamental flaws as a horror movie may make it destination viewing for after-midnight camp genre enthusiasts." Metacritic, which uses a weighted average, assigned the film a score of 32 out of 100, based on 24 critics, indicating "generally unfavorable" reviews. Audiences polled by CinemaScore gave the film an average grade of "C" on an A+ to F scale.

The Observer's Simran Hans gave the film 2/5 stars, writing, "Fashioning itself as a teen horror, Wish Upon is far too tame for most actual adolescents". Robbie Collin of The Daily Telegraph wrote, "Wish Upon tries to put a millennial spin on the premise, but fumbles everything it sets out to do so extravagantly, the film itself feels like the result of some kind of diabolical, chimpanzee-fingered pact." He gave it 1/5 stars. The Times's Ed Potton also gave it 1/5 stars, writing, "Seldom has a teen protagonist been as annoying as the one in this high-concept high-school horror... Somewhere in here there's a message about the perils of peer pressure and the cruelty of social media, but it's submerged below all the stagey angst and telegraphed peril. By the end you're hoping that Clare gets her just deserts." The Guardian's Benjamin Lee also gave the film 1/5 stars and wrote, "the makers have decided to scrap any vague attempt at originality and lazily smash together two other tried and tested conceits: the double-edged wishes from Wishmaster and the supernatural accident deaths from Final Destination. What's most remarkable about the film is how it's somehow even worse than that sounds."

Andrew Barker of Variety wrote, "By any normal standards, teen horror flick Wish Upon is a pretty bad movie. But its badness is of such a distinct and kooky character that it can't help but exert an inadvertent charm." Emily Yoshida of Vulture called the film "a deeply silly midsummer lark that makes up for the fact that it's about nothing by being incredibly entertaining." The San Francisco Chronicle's Peter Hartlaub called it "a summer movie that delivers a lowest-common-denominator good time, and mostly succeeds", and gave it 2/4 stars. Katie Walsh of the Tribune News Service called the film "a spooky teen story that's not particularly heavy on the scares, though its unintentional giggles almost ensure it a spot as a cult movie."
