= Bob Trevino Likes It =

2024 film by Tracie Laymon

- Film poster
- Directed by: Tracie Laymon
- Written by: Tracie Laymon
- Produced by: Tracie Laymon; Sean Mullin; Edgar Rosa; Felipe Dieppa
- Starring: Barbie Ferreira; John Leguizamo; French Stewart
- Cinematography: John Rosario
- Edited by: Anisha Acharya
- Music by: Jacques Brautbar
- Production companies: Laymon's Terms; Five By Eight Productions
- Distributed by: Roadside Attractions
- Release dates: March 9, 2024 (SXSW); March 21, 2025 (United States)
- Running time: 102 minutes
- Country: United States
- Language: English
- Box office: $1.1 million

Bob Trevino Likes It is a 2024 American comedy drama film written and directed by Tracie Laymon. It stars Barbie Ferreira and John Leguizamo with supporting roles provided by French Stewart and Rachel Bay Jones. The film centers on a young woman who searches for her estranged father, Bob Trevino, online and forms a bond with a different man of the same name. The story is semi-autobiographical, inspired by Laymon's personal experiences.

The film premiered at the 2024 South by Southwest Film & TV Festival on March 9, where it won the festival's Grand Jury Award and Audience Award in the Narrative Feature categories.

== Plot ==
Live-in aide Lily Trevino receives a text message from her boyfriend meant for another woman, leading her to break up with him. When she breaks the news to her father Bob and tries to connect with him through poetry, he ignores her and instead shows photos of women he is trying to impress at his retirement village.

She seeks help from a counselor, cheerily explaining her abusive childhood and her mother's abandonment, greatly upsetting the counselor, whom Lily consoles.

Lily goes along on a date with one of her father's girlfriends, causing the woman to leave after she mistakes his date for another woman. Her father abandons her and then calls security when she attempts to apologize after finding her calls and texts go unanswered. In a final attempt to apologize to him, she searches for him on Facebook, finding a Bob Trevino with no profile photo, whom she requests to befriend.

After the request is accepted, she discovers that it is not her father, but a construction manager in nearby Indiana who, like Lily, has few friends of his own. He likes her posts and the two begin a conversation and friendship online. Bob's wife Jeannie is wary of the friendship, believing that Lily is a "Catfish", but allows him to meet her.

The two finally meet when Lily's wheelchair user client Daphne accidentally causes the toilet to overflow, with Lily calling her "dad" to help. Bob is able to fix the issue but is shocked at how few life skills Lily has. He purchases a large number of tools for her, and they have coffee at a local diner, with him showing her kindness she has not received before.

Bob is distressed when he discovers that Lily has been calling him her dad to Daphne. A tearful Lily, believing that Bob will abandon her, tells him he can leave. But he instead tells her that they can talk it out, which shocks Lily. The two have a long conversation, where it is revealed that Bob and his wife's child died at a young age.

Over the next month, the two hang out and share their interests, with Bob taking Lily to his rural property to watch the Perseids meteor shower, a yearly tradition for him since the death of his son. He explains that his wife got into scrapbooking to get over the loss and is now a National Champion. When asked if she had any pets, Lily explains that she is not safe to be around animals because her father took away her dog after she picked him up wrongly when she was 10 and he yelped. Bob is shocked and tells her that it wasn't her fault. The next morning, he takes her to a rescue shelter where a reluctant Lily is able to hold a dog for the first time since. After Bob gets home, the experience allows him to ask his wife to see the scrapbook she made for their son for the first time.

Lily and Bob make plans to see each other again, but Lily's actual father rings her and says he wants to meet urgently. She begrudgingly cancels her meeting with Bob, but discovers that her father instead wants money from either her or Bob. He leaves empty handed and it inspires Lily to write a poem for Bob.

Bob, who had left a site inspection due to the inspector arriving an hour and a half late, is later blamed by his boss for a lawsuit due to the inspector injuring himself after Bob left. Bob angrily shows all the material safety data sheets and receipts for inspections he has paid out of his own pocket before quitting. While on the phone to his wife to tell her, he has a heart attack.

Lily, confused at Bob's silence, tries to contact him, eventually going to his house where she is arrested for attempting to break in. With only her father to call to pick her up, she discovers that he had cut her out of the family photo album to impress a woman. She is furious when she discovers that he not only bought the woman a dog but has no recollection of Lily's own dog. After he cannot repeat "I love you", she leaves.

Lily begins to improve her life, buying a car, spending more time with Daphne and even seeing her counselor again who is impressed with her. She continues to write to Bob, telling him about her improvements and hoping he is okay wherever he is.

One day, Lily opens up her Facebook, and sees a post from Jeannie announcing Bob's death from a second heart attack and the funeral arrangements. Lily drives to Indiana with Daphne to attend the funeral. Lily meets Jeannie for the first time, and Jeannie tells Lily that Bob read her poem and opened up about their friendship while in the hospital. Jeannie then gifts Lily a scrapbook she has made, consisting of their messages, photos and the poem, with Lily, Jeannie and Daphne embracing in tears.

== Cast ==
- Barbie Ferreira as Lily Trevino
- John Leguizamo as Bob Trevino
- French Stewart as Robert Trevino, Lily's biological father
- Rachel Bay Jones as Jeannie
- Ted Welch as Harlan
- Lauren "Lolo" Spencer as Daphne, Lily's roommate and employer
- Ashlyn Moore as Counselor

== Production ==
The film is inspired by an incident in writer-director Tracie Laymon's life where she accidentally messaged a stranger on Facebook who shared a name with her father, and was surprised to receive warmth and fatherly advice from him.

Production occurred in 2023; because it was independent of any major studios, the project received waivers to continue filming amidst the Hollywood labor disputes at the time. Filming took place in Louisville as well as other Kentucky locations in Bullitt, Franklin, Hardin, Henry, Oldham, Shelby and Spencer counties. Tracie Laymon's company, Laymon's Terms, as well as Five By Eight Productions produced the film.

== Release ==
The film premiered at the 2024 South by Southwest Film & TV Festival on March 9, where it received both the Narrative Feature Grand Jury Award and the Audience Award for Best Narrative Feature. In August 2024, Roadside Attractions acquired U.S. distribution rights to the film. It received a limited theatrical release on March 21, 2025.

It was screened in a gala presentation at the 2024 Cinéfest Sudbury International Film Festival. The film was also selected for the inaugural European edition of the Tribeca Film Festival in Lisbon and was an official selection of the 69th Valladolid International Film Festival, where it won the official selection's Audience Award. In October 2024, the film won the Best Feature Film Award at the San Diego International Film Festival.

== Reception ==
On the review aggregator website Rotten Tomatoes, 95% of 82 critics' reviews are positive. The website's consensus reads: "Drawing a lot of humane power from Barbie Ferreira and John Leguizamo's performances, Bob Trevino proves to be a very likable movie." Metacritic, which uses a weighted average, assigned the film a score of 71 out of 100, based on 19 critics, indicating "generally favorable" reviews. Audiences polled by CinemaScore gave the film an average grade of "A+" on an A+ to F scale.

Following the film's SXSW release, Matt Zoller Seitz of RogerEbert.com wrote that Bob Trevino Likes It is "the kind of movie that will make certain viewers roll their eyes but inspire others to see it multiple times in a theater, just to have that great feeling again." Seitz criticized Jeanie, Bob's wife, as a character lacking dimension but noted that his complaints about the movie were "minor in the greater scheme".

Angie Han of The Hollywood Reporter said of the film that it "draws its emotional power not from watching its characters break, but from letting them start to heal" and that it "succeeds beautifully on its own terms as a love letter, or perhaps a thank you note" but criticized how Lily and Bob seem to bond too easily, as their "jagged edges fit together as neatly as pieces of a puzzle".

The film received nominations for Best Indie Feature and Best First Feature at the 9th Astra Film Awards.
