= Dan Abraham =

American filmmaker

- Born: Dan Abraham; January 1, 1970 (age 56); United States
- Occupations: Film director; Screenwriter; Animator; Storyboard artist
- Years active: 1996−present
- Employer: Walt Disney Animation Studios (2008–present)

Dan Abraham (born January 1, 1970) is an American film director, screenwriter, animator, and storyboard artist. He is best known for his work at Walt Disney Animation Studios, including directing the short films Once Upon a Snowman (2020) and Once Upon a Studio (2023).

== Career ==
In 2014, he directed Vitaminamulch: Air Spectacular, a Planes short film released on the DVD and Blu-ray of Planes: Fire & Rescue. In the same year, he was directing the film Tink Meets Peter, alongside Stephen Anderson, prior to its cancelation when its production company DisneyToon Studios permanently closed. In 2019, he served as a storyboard artist on Frozen 2. After production wrapped on Frozen 2, he wrote and directed the short film Once Upon a Snowman, alongside Trent Correy. During the 2020 COVID-19 lockdowns, he directed an episode of the Disney+ streaming series At Home with Olaf. In 2022, he directed an episode of the Disney+ streaming series Baymax!. In 2023, he wrote and directed the short film Once Upon a Studio, also alongside Correy.

== Filmography ==
=== Short films ===
Year	Title	Director	Screenwriter	Animator	Notes/Ref(s)
2014	Vitaminamulch: Air Spectacular	Yes	No	No	
2020	Once Upon a Snowman	Yes	Yes	Yes	
2023	Once Upon a Studio	Yes	Yes	Yes	Also actor

=== Feature films ===
Year	Title	Storyboard artist	Animator	Ref(s)
1996	Space Jam	No	Assistant	
1998	Quest for Camelot	No	Key assistant	
1999	The King and I	No	Character	
2000	Joseph: King of Dreams	Inbetween	No	
2008	The Little Mermaid: Ariel's Beginning	Yes	No	
2008	Tinker Bell	Yes	No	
2009	Tinker Bell and the Lost Treasure	Additional	No	
2010	Tinker Bell and the Great Fairy Rescue	Yes	No	
2012	Secret of the Wings	Yes	No	
2014	The Pirate Fairy	Yes	No	
2019	Frozen 2	Yes	No	
2019	Klaus	No	Yes	
2021	Raya and the Last Dragon	Additional	No	
2021	Encanto	Yes	No	
2023	Wish	Yes	No	
2024	The Garfield Movie	Yes	No	
2025	Zootopia 2	Yes	No	

=== Television ===
Year	Title	Notes/Ref(s)
2020	At Home with Olaf	Director; Episode: "I Am With You"
2022	Baymax!	Director; Episode: "Mbita"

== Accolades ==
Award	Date	Category	Title	Result	Ref(s)
Children's and Family Emmy Awards	March 15, 2025	Outstanding Animated Short Form Program	Once Upon a Studio	Won	
Primetime Creative Arts Emmy Awards	September 11–12, 2021	Outstanding Short Form Animated Program	Once Upon a Snowman	Nominated	
