= All Nighter (play) =

Play

- 2025 Off-Broadway production poster
- Original language: English
- Written by: Natalie Margolin
- Characters: Lizzy; Tessa; Jacqueline; Darcie; Wilma
- Subject: Existentialism, grief, family, addiction, sexual assault
- Setting: College library, 2014

Premiere
- Date: February 25, 2025
- Place: MCC Theater
- Directed by: Jaki Bradley

All Nighter is a dramedy play by Natalie Margolin. The show, first produced Off-Broadway in 2025, follows a central group of female friends who are studying for their exams in their final week of college. The play had its world premiere off-Broadway with previews starting February 25, 2025 and opening night March 9, 2025 at the MCC Theater's Robert W. Wilson Theater, with direction by Jaki Bradley.

== Plot ==
The story revolves around a central group of four close friends (Lizzy, Tessa, Jacqueline, and Darcie) studying for final exams with only five days left of their senior year in college looming over them. During the night a series of secrets are revealed which change their lives forever.

== Cast ==
Role	MCC Theater Off-Broadway (2025)
Lizzy	Havana Rose Liu
Tessa	Alyah Chanelle Scott
Jacqueline	Kathryn Gallagher
Darcie	Kristine Froseth
Wilma	Julia Lester

Replacements

- AnnaSophia Robb as Darcie
- Isa Briones as Lizzy

== Production ==
The play had its world premiere off-Broadway with previews starting February 25, 2025 with opening night March 9, 2025 at the Robert W. Wilson Theater with direction by Jaki Bradley. The original production starred Havana Rose Liu, Alyah Chanelle Scott, Kathryn Gallagher, Kristine Froseth, and Julia Lester and was produced by the MCC Theater. It was. On April 17, 2025, a replacement cast was announced with AnnaSophia Robb and Isa Briones replacing Frøseth as Darcie and Rose Liu as Lizzy, respectively with performances starting April 30, 2025.

== Critical reception ==
The production was met with mixed to positive reviews. Robert Hofler of TheWrap praised its "aptly direction and excellent cast" adding, "Margolin knows how to construct a well-built play without making it look contrived" noting that there are "big pay-offs that had the audience at MCC gasping out loud in the final moments". Jackson McHenry of Vulture noted the chemistry of the cast, and Gilmore Girls-esque rabid fire dialogue but wrote that the script didn't fully address the conflicts that were introduced. Henry singled out Lester's performance as someone who "cannonballs into the action with a gift of a role that she can play as broad and angsty as she likes" as well as the "on-point costumes by Michelle J. Li."

Rachel Graham of TheaterMania wrote, "The humor, cultural critique, and performances make it a hangout worth attending." Maya Phillips of The New York Times wrote that despite the fact that All Nighter inches towards interesting themes it felt overall "underwhelming" adding, "[It] feels as though it has felt a lot of unfinished work on the table". She however praised the performances of Liu and Lester. David Finkle of New York Stage Review praised the direction, ensemble, and costume design while opining that the plays "final sequences..begin to feel less than convincing, more a contrivance".

== Accolades ==
=== 2025 Off-Broadway revival ===
Year	Award	Category	Nominated work	Result	Ref.
2025	Drama Desk Award	Outstanding Featured Performance in a Play	Julia Lester	Nominated	
2025	Lucille Lortel Awards	Outstanding Featured Performer in a Play	Julia Lester	Nominated	
