= Trent Correy =

Canadian filmmaker

- Born: Trent Correy; January 1, 1985 (age 41); Canada
- Education: Laguna College of Art and Design
- Occupations: Film director; Screenwriter; Animator
- Years active: 2008−present
- Employers: Mercury Filmworks (2008–10); Sony Pictures Imageworks (2010–11); Kratt Brothers Company (2012); Bardel Entertainment (2012); Walt Disney Animation Studios (2012–present)

Trent Correy (born January 1, 1985) is a Canadian film director, screenwriter and animator. He is best known for his work at Walt Disney Animation Studios, including directing the short films Once Upon a Snowman (2020) and Once Upon a Studio (2023).

== Early life ==
In the 2010s, he was enrolled at Laguna College of Art and Design, where he directed Attack of the 50 Foot Hero, which played at the 2013 Dallas International Film Festival.

== Career ==
In 2008, he began his career at Mercury Filmworks, where he served as an animator. In 2010, he then transitioned to Sony Pictures Imageworks, where he served as a character animator on The Smurfs (2011). In 2012, after then working at the Kratt Brothers Company and Bardel Entertainment, he moved to Walt Disney Animation Studios as an animation trainee in the Talent Development Program. He worked as an animator on Frozen (2013), Big Hero 6 (2014), Frozen Fever (2015), Zootopia (2016), Moana (2016), Ralph Breaks the Internet (2018), and Frozen 2 (2019). In 2018, he developed the concept for the short film One Small Step.

He wrote and directed the short film Drop, which had its world premiere at the Ottawa International Animation Festival in September 2019, before debuting on Disney+ as part of the Short Circuit streaming series. In 2020, he wrote and directed the short film Once Upon a Snowman, alongside Dan Abraham. In 2022, he wrote and directed all of the episodes of the streaming series Zootopia+, alongside Josie Trinidad. In 2023, he wrote and directed the short film Once Upon a Studio, alongside Dan Abraham. In November 2025, it was reported that Correy signed on as co-director of Frozen 3 (2027), making his feature film directorial debut.

== Filmography ==
=== Short films ===
Year	Title	Director	Screenwriter	Animator	Notes/Ref(s)
2013	Attack of the 50 Foot Hero	Yes	Yes	Yes	
2015	Frozen Fever	No	No	Yes	
2018	One Small Step	No	Concept	No	
2019	Drop	Yes	Yes	Yes	Part of the Short Circuit series
2020	Once Upon a Snowman	Yes	Yes	Yes	
2023	Once Upon a Studio	Yes	Yes	Yes	Also actor

=== Feature films ===
Year	Title	Director	Animator	Notes/Ref(s)
2011	The Smurfs	No	Yes	
2013	Frozen	No	Yes	
2014	Big Hero 6	No	Yes	
2016	Zootopia	No	Yes	
2016	Moana	No	Yes	
2018	Ralph Breaks the Internet	No	Yes	
2019	Frozen 2	No	Supervisor	
2021	Raya and the Last Dragon	No	Yes	
2021	Encanto	No	Additional	Creative leadership
2027	Frozen 3 †	Co-director	TBA	In production

=== Television ===
Year	Title	Director	Screenwriter	Animator	Notes/Ref(s)
2012–14	Wild Kratts	No	No	Storyboard revisionist	6 episodes
2020	At Home with Olaf	No	Episode: "Ice"	2 episodes	
2022	Zootopia+	Yes	Yes	No	6 episodes

== Accolades ==
Award	Date	Category	Title	Result	Ref(s)
Academy Awards	February 24, 2019	Best Animated Short Film	One Small Step	Nominated	
Children's and Family Emmy Awards	December 16–17, 2023	Outstanding Directing for an Animated Program	Zootopia+	Nominated	
Children's and Family Emmy Awards	March 15, 2025	Outstanding Animated Short Form Program	Once Upon a Studio	Won	
Primetime Creative Arts Emmy Awards	September 11–12, 2021	Outstanding Short Form Animated Program	Once Upon a Snowman	Nominated	
