= Zootopia+ =

American animated television shorts miniseries

- Genre: Anthology; Comedy
- Written by: Trent Correy; Josie Trinidad; Michael Herrera
- Directed by: Trent Correy; Josie Trinidad
- Theme music composer: Curtis Green; Mick Giacchino
- Composers: Curtis Green; Mick Giacchino; Michael Giacchino ("Duke: The Musical")
- Country of origin: United States
- Original language: English
- No. of episodes: 6

Production
- Executive producers: Jennifer Lee; Jared Bush; Byron Howard
- Producer: Nathan Curtis
- Cinematography: Joaquin Baldwin (layout); Gina Warr Lawes (lighting)
- Editors: Shannon Stein; Jeff Draheim
- Running time: 7 minutes
- Production company: Walt Disney Animation Studios

Original release
- Network: Disney+
- Release: November 9, 2022

Related
- Zootopia

Zootopia+ (marketed as Zootropolis+ in Europe) is an American animated series of shorts based on the 2016 film Zootopia. Produced by Walt Disney Animation Studios, it was released on Disney+ on November 9, 2022.

== Synopsis ==
Zootopia+ is an anthology series comprising six short episodes that interweave with the events of the original film, with each installment employing a distinct style to follow a different character. The series revisits supporting characters from the film, expanding on their roles and perspectives within the narrative.

== Voice cast ==
- Bonnie Hunt as Bonnie Hopps
- Don Lake as Stu Hopps
- John Lavelle as Yax, Gerald Cook, Additional Voices
- Leah Latham as Fru Fru
- Michelle Buteau as Tru Tru
- Katie Lowes as Molly Hopps, Brianca and Mandy
- Crystal Kung Minkoff as Charisma
- Porsha Williams as Christine
- Maurice LaMarche as Mr. Big
- Alan Tudyk as Duke Weaselton
- Imari Williams as Rhino Boss and Additional Voices
- Nate Torrence as Benjamin Clawhauser
- Idris Elba as Chief Bogo
- Shakira as Gazelle
- Charlotte Nicdao as Sam
- Raymond S. Persi as Flash Slothmore
- Kristen Bell as Priscilla Tripletoe
- Byron Howard as Bucky
- Jared Bush as Pronk

Archive audio of Ginnifer Goodwin and Jason Bateman as Judy Hopps and Nick Wilde was utilized in this anthology.

== Episodes ==
| No. | Title | Directed by | Written by | Original release date |
|---|---|---|---|---|
| 1 | "Hopp on Board" | Trent Correy & Josie Trinidad | Josie Trinidad, Trent Correy & Michael Herrera | November 9, 2022 |
Shortly after bidding Judy goodbye as she departs for Zootopia, her parents Bonnie and Stu notice their youngest daughter Molly atop of the train taking Judy. They run in pursuit in their truck, avoiding hitting other people in their path, while failing to inform Judy of the situation. Stu eventually manages to get atop of the train, but ends up falling off and being rescued by Bonnie after struggling with Zootopia's environments. The train arrives at the station and Molly almost falls onto the rails, but Bonnie and Stu save her before she could be hit by a train. Molly then goes atop a train going back to Bunnyburrow, forcing Bonnie and Stu to chase her once again.
| 2 | "The Real Rodents of Little Rodentia" | Trent Correy & Josie Trinidad | Josie Trinidad, Trent Correy & Michael Herrera | November 9, 2022 |
A reality television show interviews Fru Fru and her friends where she had to deal with her cousin Tru Tru being the maid of honor and planning her upcoming wedding, which leads to a fight with one another. Afterwards, Fru Fru went to go shopping and was nearly crushed by a large donut, only to be saved by Judy. After getting an epiphany, she leaves the show and fixes her differences with Tru Tru, who then gives her the dress her mother wore at her wedding. Previews from the next episode show that the girls had inhaled Night Howlers that were put in the wedding bouquet, sending them into a savage rage.
| 3 | "Duke the Musical" | Trent Correy & Josie Trinidad | Josie Trinidad, Trent Correy & Michael Herrera | November 9, 2022 |
After getting caught by Judy and publicly humiliated, Duke Weaselton reconsiders his life choices through song, which puts him in a scenario of getting rich by doing all kinds of schemes until he comes to the conclusion that his checkered past is an issue. He decides to turn his life around by giving an old goat lady her wallet back, only to have her get hit by a security truck containing a lot of money, putting him back in his old ways.
| 4 | "The Godfather of the Bride" | Trent Correy & Josie Trinidad | Josie Trinidad, Trent Correy & Michael Herrera | November 9, 2022 |
At Fru Fru's wedding, Mr. Big gives a speech and flashes back to his humble beginnings where he arrives in Zootopia along with his grandmother in an unknown period during the 20th century and he has to confront the challenges of being a small mammal while helping his grandmother to sell cannoli to the rest of the neighborhood. After making friends with a polar bear, they were confronted by some gangsters trying to eject the small mammals out of the city. Using his wits and the help of his friends, Mr. Big is able to beat the gangsters, getting the respect of the community and becoming the Don of Little Rodentia.
| 5 | "So You Think You Can Prance" | Trent Correy & Josie Trinidad | Josie Trinidad, Trent Correy & Michael Herrera | November 9, 2022 |
Clawhauser learns that Zootopia’s biggest talent competition, So You Think You Can Prance, is looking for a couple of back-up dancers for Gazelle, so he decides to participate and calls a red code at the studio to get a partner. Chief Bogo arrives and Clawhauser fools him to believe they are working as covert agents in order to join the competition. When they reach their opportunity, Clawhauser tells Bogo the truth and he decides to desert the competition, leaving Clawhauser on the edge of elimination. However, Bogo comes back and helps Clawhauser win the competition, becoming Gazelle's back-up dancers, until everything is revealed to be Clawhauser's dream. After being alerted that Judy found the missing mammals, Clawhauser quickly goes to inform Bogo, who is playing Gazelle's dancing game on his phone.
| 6 | "Dinner Rush" | Trent Correy & Josie Trinidad | Josie Trinidad, Trent Correy & Michael Herrera | November 9, 2022 |
An otter waitress named Sam is expecting to finish her work in time to go to Gazelle's concert, but her last customers are Flash and Priscilla, the sloths from the DMV office, and she struggles to deal with their slow ways to move and speak which puts the rest of the restaurant in chaos. The customers confront Sam for her terrible service, but to their surprise, Flash proposes to Priscilla, who happily accepts. They are also in an understandable hurry to get to the concert, so they offer Sam a ride, only to be pulled over by Judy and Nick for speeding.

== Production ==
=== Development ===
On December 10, 2020, Walt Disney Animation Studios chief creative officer Jennifer Lee announced that a spin-off series titled Zootopia+ and based on the 2016 film Zootopia was in development at the studio for Disney+. Trent Correy and Josie Trinidad, who worked as an animator and head of story on the film, respectively, were set to direct the series. The idea for the series was suggested by Correy during a pitch presentation in 2020, as one of three pitches for potential Disney+ series; he developed a pitch for a Zootopia series due to his interest in wanting to further explore the film's world and characters. Trinidad was originally set to direct only two episodes for the series, but her excitement to work on the project caused her to be ascended to co-director for the entire series alongside Correy. The series was produced remotely due to the COVID-19 pandemic, which complicated the production process according to producer Nathan Curtis. Correy's pitch featured 10 stories, but four of them had to be discarded due to receiving a 6-episode order. Lee executive-produced the series alongside Zootopia co-directors and Encanto directors Byron Howard and Jared Bush.

=== Writing ===
The series was written during the storyboard process, with story artists writing lines or developing the structure for the story of each episode. Each episode explores secondary characters from Zootopia during the film's events, with the series featuring a different genre per episode, an idea conceived by Correy. He was inspired by his work on the Disney+ short Once Upon a Snowman, which focused on Olaf's story during the events of Frozen (2013). The episodes were written in chronological order, with each episode coinciding in airing with the order of the scenes they are set around. The idea of having the series focus on secondary characters during the events of the film was conceived due to the filmmakers wanting to further explore the world and characters depicted in the film. One of episodes explores the life of mob boss Mr. Big from his childhood until his daughter's wedding in an homage to The Godfather Part II, while also exploring immigration issues.

According to Trinidad, some of the shorts were already planned by Correy, while others were conceived during production. Other ideas were changed during production, such as the episode centering on Duke Weaselton, which was originally written as a heist film in the vein of Ocean's Eleven. The idea for the final episode centering on Flash and Priscilla at a restaurant was conceived by Correy, Trinidad, and story supervisor Michael Herrera. Several ideas on how to portray the story were considered, including a nature documentary and a horror story, before conceiving an idea that centered on a new character learning to accept them, as the filmmakers felt Flash never "needed to change".

=== Animation ===
The series marks the first time Pixar's Presto animation software was used prominently on a non-Pixar project. Head of character Frank Hanner updated the character models from the original film to make them compatible with the software.

Production designer Jim Finn worked closely with directors of photography Joaquin Baldwin and Gina Warr Lawes to develop the visual style for each episode. Editor Shannon Stein worked during the edition process to help establish each episode's distinctive tone and genre.

=== Music ===
Five of the episodes were composed by Curtis Green and Mick Giacchino. However, Giacchino's father, Michael Giacchino, who composed for the original Zootopia film, composed the music for "Duke the Musical". The song written for the same episode, "Big Time" was composed by Michael with lyrics by Kate Anderson and Elyssa Samsel (Olaf's Frozen Adventure, Central Park).

== Release ==
Zootopia+ premiered on Disney+ on November 9, 2022. The series made its linear television debut on August 2, 2025, on Disney Channel, followed by a subsequent airing on Disney XD on August 25, 2025. The series consists of six episodes.

== Reception ==
=== Viewership ===
Zootopia+ ranked No. 7 on Disney+'s daily "Top 10" list on the day of its premiere—a ranking based on daily viewership across both films and episodic content—and remained on the chart through November 20, 2025. On December 12, The Walt Disney Company reported that Zootopia and Zootopia+ had generated record viewership on Disney+, with more than 725 million hours streamed globally on the platform. On March 19, 2026, the company announced that Zootopia, Zootopia+, and Zootopia 2 had collectively accumulated over 885 million hours of streaming worldwide to date.

=== Critical response ===
Alexander Navarro of MovieWeb called Zootopia+ the "perfect extension of the original Zootopia film," asserting, "Zootopia+ does show more of the world of Zootopia that viewers weren’t aware of before, following through on all the memorable characters introduced in the 2016 film. With each episode roughly having only an average of 7-minute runtimes, the series has so much more potential to be more entertaining for viewers with an increased number of episodes. While there hasn’t been much confirmation on a movie sequel, for now, fans can dive back into the gloriously colorful and eclectic world of Zootopia."

Tara Bennett of IGN gave the television series a grade of 8 out of 10, writing, "Zootopia+ is a fun dip back into the world of support characters established in the 2016 Walt Disney Studios Animation movie. As is the case with most short story endeavors on Disney+, the end result is a mixed bag of episodes that range from the very funny (“The Godfather of the Bride”) to the cute (“So You Think You Can Prance”). Each is definitely entertaining and worth the watch and reminds just how fertile the world of Zootopia is for more storytelling."

Diondra Brown of Common Sense Media gave Zootopia+ a grade of 4 out of 5 stars, praised the depiction of positive messages and role models, stating that the show promotes creativity, imagination, and teamwork, while noting the diverse representations across the characters and voice actors.

=== Accolades ===
| Award | Date of Ceremony | Category | Nominee(s) | Result | Ref. |
|---|---|---|---|---|---|
| Annie Awards | February 25, 2023 | Outstanding Achievement for Voice Acting in an Animated Television / Broadcast Production | Maurice LaMarche | Won | |
| Children's and Family Emmy Awards | December 16–17, 2023 | Outstanding Children's or Young Teen Animated Series | Zootopia+ | Won | |
| Children's and Family Emmy Awards | December 16–17, 2023 | Outstanding Directing for an Animated Program | Trent Correy and Josie Trinidad | Nominated | |
| Children's and Family Emmy Awards | December 16–17, 2023 | Outstanding Editing for an Animated Program | Jeff Draheim and Shannon Stein | Nominated | |
| NAACP Image Awards | February 25, 2023 | Outstanding Short-Form Series (Drama or Comedy) and Outstanding Animated Series | Zootopia+ | Nominated | |
| NAACP Image Awards | February 25, 2023 | Outstanding Animated Series | Zootopia+ | Nominated | |
