= Renika Williams =

American actress

- Born: November 5, 1992 (age 33)
- Occupation: Actress
- Years active: 2016–present

Renika Williams is an American actress. She is best known for playing Willow in the teen comedy-drama series The Sex Lives of College Girls and as the college intern in the Walt Disney short film Once Upon a Studio.

== Early life ==
Williams is from Dayton, Ohio. She became interested in the 6th grade when she auditioned for the local arts magnet school. She graduated from Wright State University in 2015.

== Career ==
Williams first recurring role came playing Leslie in the comedy series Placeholders starring Teyonah Parris. Her first big role came playing the lead as a college intern in the Walt Disney short film Once Upon a Studio. Her biggest role so far has been playing Willow in the teen comedy-drama series The Sex Lives of College Girls She played Olivette in the final season of the medical drama series New Amsterdam. She made a one-off appearance playing the teenage version of the lead character Mercedes played by Brandee Evans in the drama series P-Valley.

== Personal life ==
Williams is involved for raising awareness of Sickle Cell Anemia which took the life of her best friend. In her spare time she likes yoga, cycling and reading. Her favourite book is Sula by Toni Morrison.

== Filmography ==
=== Film ===
Year	Title	Role	Notes
2016	Passing History	Jessica Floops	Short
2018	Cashed	Monique	Short
2019	Cuddle	Liz	
2020	Healing River	Rose Harken	
2021	Intrusion	Helena	
2023	Once Upon a Studio	College Intern	Short
2024	The Fabulous Four	Shivani	

=== Television ===
Year	Title	Role	Notes
2017	Placeholders	Leslie	2 episodes
2021	Modern Love	Adult Meesha	Episode; A Life Plan for Two, Followed by One
2022	Baby Mouth	Guest	Episode; Renika Williams Feeds Jimmy Fried Okra
2022	P-Valley	Teenage Mercedes	Episode; Jackson
2022	New Amsterdam	Olivette	Episode; The Empty Spaces
2021-2025	The Sex Lives of College Girls	Willow	24 episodes
2025	Reasonable Doubt	Younger Monica	Episode; D'Evils
