= Alyah Chanelle Scott =

American actress

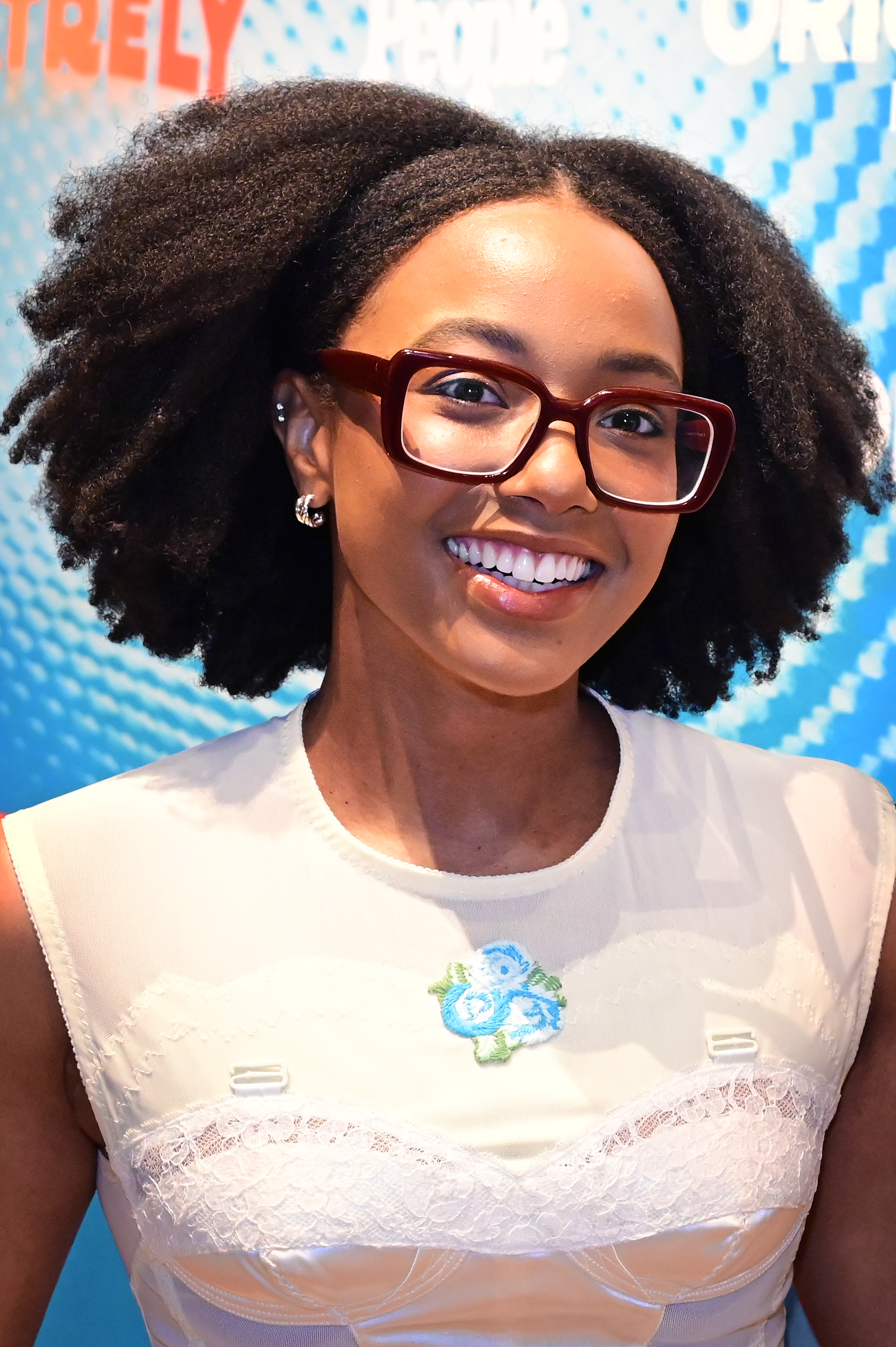
- Scott in 2026
- Born: July 3, 1997 (age 29); Houston, Texas, U.S.
- Education: University of Michigan
- Occupations: Actor, director, producer

Alyah Chanelle Scott (born July 3, 1997) is an American actress, director, and producer. She is best known for her roles as Whitney Chase on the 2021 HBO Max series The Sex Lives of College Girls and as Timberly Fox on the 2022 Hulu series Reboot. Scott won the Tony Award for Best Revival of a Musical, as a producer on the 2023 revival of Parade.

== Early life and education ==
Alyah Chanelle Scott grew up in Pearland, Texas, a suburb of Houston. Her mother is a NASA aerospace engineer and her father works in finance at a car company. She attended Glenda Dawson High School, graduating in 2015.

She received a BFA from the University of Michigan's musical theatre program.

== Career ==
=== Acting ===
Scott spent various summers performing in productions at Music Theatre Wichita, including The Hunchback of Notre Dame and Pippin. While in her senior year of college, Scott landed the role of Nabulungi, the female lead in The Book of Mormon, for the musical's U.S. national tour. She joined the tour in July 2019 and performed in hundreds of shows through early 2020 when its shows were canceled due to the COVID-19 pandemic.

Scott starred on Mindy Kaling's The Sex Lives of College Girls, as Whitney Chase, which premiered on HBO Max on November 18, 2021. The show was renewed for two more seasons before being cancelled in 2025.

Scott also starred in Steve Levitan's Reboot, as Timberly Fox, which premiered on Hulu on September 20, 2022.

=== Producing ===
As a co-producer on the Runyonland Sussman team for the 2023 Broadway revival of Parade, Scott won the Tony Award for Best Revival of a Musical. That same year she was nominated for the Tony Award for Best Revival of a Play for the 2023 revival of Ibsen's A Doll's House, starring Jessica Chastain (as a co-producer with the with OHenry Theatre Nerd Productions / Runyonland MMP team).

Scott's other production credits include the 2023 Broadway revival of The Sign in Sidney Brustein's Window, Gutenberg! The Musical!, and the 2024 revival of The Wiz.

=== Directing ===
Scott directed the music videos to Reneé Rapp's songs "Talk Too Much" and "Snow Angel", released in August 2023 and June 2023, respectively.

== Filmography ==
=== Television ===
Year	Title	Role	Notes
2019	The Walk Off	McKenna	Film short
2021–2025	The Sex Lives of College Girls	Whitney Chase	Lead role
2022	Reboot	Timberly Fox	Recurring role
2025	Hal & Harper	Jesse	Recurring role

=== Theater ===
Year	Production	Role	Venue(s)	Notes	Ref.
2019–2020	The Book of Mormon	Nabulungi	U.S. national tour		
2025	Dry Land	Ester	The Newman Mills Theater, Off-Broadway	Main role; one-off benefit reading	
2025	All Nighter	Tessa	The Newman Mills Theater, Off-Broadway		

=== Music videos ===
Year	Title	Artist	Notes
2022	"Too Well"	Reneé Rapp	
2023	"Snow Angel"	Reneé Rapp	Director
2023	"Talk Too Much"	Reneé Rapp	Director

== Awards and nominations ==
Year	Association	Category	Nominated work	Result	Ref.
2023	Drama League Award	Outstanding Revival of a Play (as a producer)	A Doll's House	Won	
2023	Tony Awards	Best Revival of a Play (as a producer)	A Doll's House	Nominated	
2023	Tony Awards	Best Revival of a Musical (as a producer)	Parade	Won	
2023	Drama Desk Awards	Outstanding Revival of a Musical	Parade	Won	
