= Once Upon a Studio =

2023 short film by Dan Abraham and Trent Correy

- Promotional poster
- Directed by: Dan Abraham; Trent Correy
- Written by: Dan Abraham; Trent Correy
- Produced by: Yvett Merino; Bradford Simonsen
- Starring: Chris Diamantopoulos
- Cinematography: John Hasbrook (layout); Daniel Rice (lighting)
- Edited by: Michael Louis Hill
- Music by: Dave Metzger
- Production company: Walt Disney Animation Studios
- Distributed by: Walt Disney Studios; Motion Pictures (Note: Distributed by Walt Disney Studios Motion Pictures through the Walt Disney Pictures banner.)
- Release dates: June 11, 2023 (Annecy); October 13, 2023 (with Moana; Re-release); October 15, 2023 (ABC); October 16, 2023 (Disney+, Hulu); December 15, 2023 (with Wish in Japan); December 24, 2023 (YouTube)
- Running time: 9 minutes
- Country: United States
- Language: English

Once Upon a Studio is a 2023 American live-action animated fantasy comedy short film written and directed by Dan Abraham and Trent Correy. Produced by Walt Disney Animation Studios, it is commissioned for the occasion of the Walt Disney Company's centennial.

In the film, Disney characters come to life from pictures and animation frames hanging on the walls of the Roy E. Disney Animation Building following the end of a usual work day. Combining computer graphics and traditional animation on live-action backgrounds, the short features characters from the majority of the studio's works made up to that point. (Note: Includes all 61 feature films at the time of the short's release as well as the then-forthcoming Wish (2023), numerous short films, and some live-action Disney films featuring animation produced by the studio such as The Reluctant Dragon (1941), Mary Poppins (1964), Bedknobs and Broomsticks (1971), and Pete's Dragon (1977).) The film is dedicated to Burny Mattinson, the company's longest-serving employee, who makes a cameo appearance and died eight months before its release.

Once Upon a Studio premiered at the Annecy International Animation Film Festival on June 11, 2023, and had its first public screening in the United States on ABC's The Wonderful World of Disney on October 15, along with the world television premiere of Encanto.

== Plot ==
On October 16, 2023, employees from Walt Disney Animation Studios, which is celebrating its centennial, leave at the end of their work day. An intern (Renika Williams) converses with Burny Mattinson about the studio turning 100 years old, with Mattinson musing, "If these walls could talk..."

Inside the studio, Mattinson's wish comes true. Mickey Mouse, in a production cel from Mickey's Birthday Party (1942), comes to life and calls Tinker Bell (Peter Pan, 1953). Mickey asks her if all of the employees are gone, to which she nods. Excited, Mickey and Minnie Mouse jump out of the cel, with Minnie getting many of the characters from the studio's filmography to all meet in the lobby. In various places in the building, different characters begin to prepare for the meeting. While everyone is getting prepared, Mickey approaches a photograph of studio co-founder Walt Disney and thanks him in a private, somber moment while "Feed the Birds" (Disney's favorite song) plays in the background.

All the characters go outside to the lobby to take a group photo for the 100th anniversary with Mickey getting them together. However, Goofy accidentally falls off his ladder, thus causing the camera to break into pieces. Everyone starts to leave sadly as the group photo is apparently canceled. Just then, Alan-a-Dale (Robin Hood, 1973) plays "When You Wish Upon a Star" on his lute, joined in by other characters playing their instruments and taking turns to sing the song's lyrics.

Meanwhile, the Magic Brooms (Fantasia, 1940) sweep up the pieces of Goofy's camera, Felix, Jr. (Wreck-It Ralph, 2012) repairs the camera to its original state, Hercules (Hercules, 1997) puts the ladder back in position, and the Fairy Godmother (Cinderella, 1950) uses her magic to help Goofy up the ladder while setting the camera up for the photo. The rest of the group of characters sing the next line in the song, before Mickey holds up Jiminy Cricket (Pinocchio, 1940), who leads the assembled characters for the song's final line before they pose for the group photo, with Tinker Bell using her wand to match cut to the finished photo.

The short film ends with a message that reads, "To all who imagined with us, laughed with us, and dreamed with us. Thank you".

== Cast ==
- Burny Mattinson as himself
- Renika Williams as an intern

=== Voice cast ===
- Scott Adsit as Baymax (Big Hero 6)
- Tony Anselmo as Donald Duck
- Jason Bateman as Nick Wilde (Zootopia)
- Kristen Bell as Anna (Frozen)
- Jodi Benson as Ariel (The Little Mermaid)
- Robby Benson as the Beast (Beauty and the Beast)
- Ravi Cabot-Conyers as Antonio Madrigal (Encanto)
- Griffen Campbell as Pinocchio
- Auli'i Cravalho as Moana
- Jim Cummings as Baloo (The Jungle Book) and Winnie the Pooh
- Ariana DeBose as Asha (Wish)
- Chris Diamantopoulos as Mickey Mouse
- Richard Epcar as Little John (Robin Hood)
- Bill Farmer as Goofy and Pluto
- Keith Ferguson as Prince Charming (Cinderella)
- Josh Gad as Olaf (Frozen)
- Ginnifer Goodwin as Judy Hopps (Zootopia)
- Jonathan Groff as Kristoff (Frozen)
- Jennifer Hale as Cinderella
- Jessica Darrow as Luisa Madrigal (in Once Upon a Studio Theater version)
- Jess Harnell as Scuttle (The Little Mermaid)
- Tom Hulce as Quasimodo (The Hunchback of Notre Dame)
- Jeremy Irons as Scar (The Lion King)
- Dwayne Johnson as Maui (Moana)
- Bob Joles as Cogsworth (Beauty and the Beast)
- Judy Kuhn as Pocahontas
- Nathan Lane as Timon (The Lion King)
- Luke Lowe as Flounder (The Little Mermaid)
- Idina Menzel as Elsa (Frozen)
- Jim Meskimen as Eeyore (Winnie the Pooh) and Merlin (The Sword in the Stone)
- Piotr Michael as Iago (Aladdin)
- Mandy Moore as Rapunzel (Tangled)
- Mark Moseley as Mushu (Mulan)
- Paige O'Hara as Belle (Beauty and the Beast)
- Raymond S. Persi as Flash (Zootopia)
- Ian R'Mante as Thumper (Bambi)
- Nate Torrence as Benjamin Clawhauser (in Once Upon a Studio Theater version)
- John C. Reilly as Ralph (Wreck-It Ralph)
- Phoenix Reisser as Mowgli (The Jungle Book)
- Kaitlyn Robrock as Minnie Mouse
- Anika Noni Rose as Tiana (The Princess and the Frog)
- Lea Salonga as Mulan
- Lee Slobotkin as Peter Pan
- Natalie Babbitt Taylor as Snow White
- Josh Robert Thompson as Grumpy (Snow White and the Seven Dwarfs)
- Kelly Marie Tran as Raya
- Alan Tudyk as the Mad Hatter (Alice in Wonderland)
- Scott Weinger as Aladdin
- Richard White as Gaston (Beauty and the Beast)
- Harland Williams as Carl (Meet the Robinsons)
- Daniel Wolfe as Robin Hood
- James Woods as Hades (Hercules)

=== Archival recordings ===
- Stan Alexander as Flower (Bambi)
- Stephen J. Anderson as Bowler Hat Guy (Meet the Robinsons)
- Awkwafina as Sisu (Raya and the Last Dragon)
- Bill Baucom as Trusty (Lady and the Tramp)
- Kathryn Beaumont as Alice (Alice in Wonderland) (in Once Upon a Studio Theater version)
- Peter Behn as Thumper (Bambi)
- Eric Blore as Mr. Toad (The Adventures of Ichabod and Mr. Toad)
- John Fiedler as Piglet (in Once Upon a Studio Theater version)
- Charlie Callas as Elliott (Pete's Dragon)
- Pat Carroll as Ursula (The Little Mermaid)
- Bobby Driscoll as Peter Pan
- Hans Conried as Captain Hook (Peter Pan) (in Once Upon a Studio Theater version)
- Cliff Edwards as Jiminy Cricket (Pinocchio)
- Verna Felton as Flora (Sleeping Beauty)
- Val Bettin as David Q. Dawson (The Great Mouse Detective) (in Once Upon a Studio Theater version)
- Santino Fontana as Hans (Frozen)
- Joseph Gordon-Levitt as Jim Hawkins (Treasure Planet)
- Robert Guillaume as Rafiki (The Lion King)
- Sterling Holloway as the Cheshire Cat (Alice in Wonderland), Kaa (The Jungle Book), and Winnie the Pooh
- Billy Joel as Dodger (Oliver & Company)
- Charles Judels as Stromboli (Pinocchio)
- Bill Thompson as the White Rabbit (Alice in Wonderland) (in Once Upon a Studio Theater version)
- Barbara Luddy as Merryweather (Sleeping Beauty)
- James MacDonald as Jaq and Gus (Cinderella)
- Bob Newhart as Bernard (The Rescuers)
- Clarence Nash as Donald Duck
- Jonathan Taylor Thomas as Young Simba (in Once Upon a Studio Theater version)
- Niketa Calame as Young Nala (in Once Upon a Studio Theater version)
- Adam Ryen as Cody (The Rescuers Down Under)
- Chris Sanders as Stitch (Lilo & Stitch)
- Hannes Schroll as Goofy's holler (uncredited)
- Sarah Silverman as Vanellope von Schweetz (Wreck-It Ralph)
- David Spade as Kuzco (The Emperor's New Groove)
- Mark Walton as Rhino (Bolt)
- Frank Welker as Abu (Aladdin), Joanna (The Rescuers Down Under) and Max (The Little Mermaid) (uncredited for Max)
- Robin Williams as the Genie (Aladdin)
- Terence Blanchard as Louis's trumpet playing (The Princess and the Frog)
- Alan Young as Scrooge McDuck (Mickey's Christmas Carol)

== Production ==
=== Development ===
Once Upon a Studio was created spontaneously in preparation for the Walt Disney Company's centennial in October 2023; directors Trent Correy and Dan Abraham discussed ideas during their free time for approximately eight months. The duo called the film a "love letter" to Walt Disney Animation Studios as well as "a thank you to anyone in the audience that's ever connected with a film over the last hundred years".

The short film includes 543 characters from the studio's feature and short films, up to Wish (2023), and vocals from more than 40 voice actors. Archival recordings were used for certain actors who died or were unavailable to do so; this included the Genie's dialogue, which was sourced from previously unused audio recorded by Robin Williams under acceptance from Williams' estate, according to Josh Gad, the voice of Olaf. Other archive recordings taken from their original films include Bobby Driscoll as Peter Pan and Cliff Edwards as Jiminy Cricket, as the filmmakers intended not to recast those characters.

=== Animation ===
The group photo that concludes the film, featuring a large crowd of over 543 Disney characters from multiple features and shorts represented.

Once Upon a Studio combines traditional animation, computer animation, and live-action footage, with Eric Goldberg serving as the head of hand-drawn animation, while Andrew Feliciano worked as head of computer animation. Among the hand-drawn animators recruited for the short was current Disney animators Mark Henn, Randy Haycock, Alex Kupershmidt, and Bert Klein also provided animation for the short, as did former Disney animators James Baxter, Ruben A. Aquino, Tony Bancroft, Nik Ranieri, and Will Finn; the animators worked both on characters they have previously animated in addition to other classic characters; Baxter requested the directors to work on characters from Bambi (1942), having been a fan of the film while growing up. Goldberg recruited CGI animators in the studio who also had experience in hand-drawn animation. Hand-drawn apprentices were also hired to provide animation for the short. The characters were animated in a way that replicated their original films' art style.

Almost 80% of the short's animation is hand-drawn. By the directors' insistence, the hand-drawn animation was done with ink and paper, which Goldberg approved of. Goldberg made the scenes entirely hand-drawn, after which Feliciano would create CGI animation that would match the hand-drawn characters' movement. He also personally animated the scene where Mickey approaches a photo of Walt Disney, as he was interested in the scene because of its emotional tone, as well as the Genie, which he originally animated in Aladdin (1992), and characters originally drawn by Ward Kimball.

CGI animators had to rebuild the character models for CGI characters from films created before Tangled (2010) due to updates made to animation technology over the years, with rigging and rendering being reworked so that they could be used with modern technology. The CGI animators worked closely with the hand-drawn team, with Goldberg and Feliciano, the latter a fan of Aladdin since childhood, inspecting the short to determine whether a scene would be led by a hand-drawn or CGI character, after which they would evaluate whether a hand-drawn or CGI character should be animated first in the scene. Animators with experience in hand-drawn and CGI animation, such as Tyler Pacana and Anthony DeRosa, worked on scenes combining both formats; Pacana used a technique named "2D puppetry" to help rig the final photo shot.

Many of the props that the animated characters interact with are CGI, including the vending machine that Stromboli shakes and Goofy's camera and ladder.

An early idea the filmmakers received from studio employees multiple times was to include a scene of a room full of all the characters voiced by Alan Tudyk since he has voiced a character in every Disney Animation film since Wreck-It Ralph (2012). This idea was abandoned, though Tudyk was included in the short as the voice of the Mad Hatter from Alice in Wonderland (1951).

=== Music ===
Dave Metzger composed the score for the short, which was composed so that it would feel reminiscent of each character's debut appearance. In the scene where Mickey approaches a photo of Walt Disney, the song "Feed the Birds" from Mary Poppins (1964) is heard, which was chosen due to being Disney's favorite. As they discussed the idea with executive music producer Matt Walker, he suggested bringing in song co-writer Richard M. Sherman to perform a new rendition of the song. Sherman recorded the song on August 22, 2022, at Disney's original office and using the same piano the Sherman Brothers used to perform the song for Disney. The song, "When You Wish Upon a Star" from Pinocchio (1940), was sung by the cast in the finale. In this version, various characters take turns singing, until the song eventually becomes a unified chorus sung by everyone there. While it remains unclear exactly how many of the returning voice actors joined in for the end of the song, many have reached the conclusion that most if not all of them recorded.

== Release ==
Once Upon a Studio had its world premiere at the Annecy International Animation Film Festival during the opening day celebration on June 11th, 2023. It was also screened for attendees at the Walt Disney Studios panel at Destination D23 on September 10th, where it received a standing ovation, and as the BFI Special Matinee of the BFI London Film Festival Opening Day event on October 14. It had its first public showing on ABC on October 15th (as part of The Wonderful World of Disney: Disney's 100th Anniversary Celebration, hosted by Kelly Ripa) in front of the TV premiere of Encanto, before streaming on October 16th on Disney+ and Hulu, and aired on the same date on Disney Channel (as part of Once Upon a Monday Movie Marathon) in front of an airing of Frozen II, Disney Junior, FX, FXX, FXM, and Freeform. The short was later released on YouTube on December 24th. In Canada, it premiered on CTV 2 the same day as the ABC broadcast. Unlike the American broadcast, which featured a host and an intro, CTV 2 only aired the short and Encanto afterwards. On October 18, 2023, Disneyland Resort announced that a short film, Once Upon a Studio was added inside the Opera House theater in Main Street Cinema at Disneyland, since the beginning of the 100th anniversary celebration of the Walt Disney Company and Walt Disney Animation Studios on October 16th, 2023.

There was a discussion of pairing it with the theatrical release of Wish (2023), but Disney decided to release it in a more accessible format. However, it was theatrically released alongside Wish in Japan on December 15th, 2023. It was also screened in theaters with a Disney100 limited engagement re-release of Moana (2016), and for one week at the El Capitan Theatre in Los Angeles, where public screenings were held to qualify it for the Best Animated Short Film shortlist for the 96th Academy Awards. It would ultimately make the shortlist on December 21. (Note: Attributed to multiple references:)

The short has been screened permanently at the Once Upon a Studio Theater inside The Magic of Disney Animation at Disney’s Hollywood Studios in Walt Disney World since the attraction reopened on September 14, 2026. This version of the presentation incorporates additional immersive elements, including animated portraits on the theater walls depicting characters who eventually leave their frames and appear in the film.

=== Home media ===
Once Upon a Studio was released on digital platforms on January 23, 2024. It was included in the Blu-ray and Ultra HD Blu-ray releases of Wish, which was released on March 12, 2024.

== Reception ==
=== Critical response ===
The short received positive reviews from critics, who called it an "emotional and nostalgic experience."

=== Ratings ===
The short premiered on ABC on Sunday, October 15th, 2023, as a "sustainer" to the network television premiere of Encanto (2021) from 8:00 pm to 8:11 pm, in which it received 2.57 million total viewers in 1.736 million households, with a 1.39/4 HH rating. It also received a 0.45/4 adults 18–49 rating/share, which was equivalent to 0.587 million viewers watching in that demographic. Its premiere on Disney Channel the following day at 6:05 pm (serving as a sustainer to a "Disney Channel Movie") received 0.349 million viewers, making the highest rated program on the network that week and the 343rd most viewed program on all of cable television.

=== Accolades ===
Award	Date of ceremony	Category	Recipient(s)	Result	Ref(s)
Astra Film and Creative Awards	January 6, 2024	Best Short Film	Once Upon a Studio	Nominated	
Children's and Family Emmy Awards	March 15, 2025	Outstanding Animated Short Form Program	Once Upon a Studio	Won	

== See also ==
- House of Mouse, an animated television series by Roberts Gannaway and Tony Craig that is also a crossover of many Disney Animated Canon films.
- Once Upon a Mouse, a 1981 animated featurette by Jerry Kramer and Gary Rocklen produced to commemorate the studio's 24th animated feature film, The Fox and the Hound. (Note: The Fox and the Hound was advertised as the 20th in the Disney canon prior to its release.)
- Who Framed Roger Rabbit, a 1988 film by Robert Zemeckis that is also a crossover of many animated characters (including Disney's) in a live-action environment.
- Chip 'n Dale: Rescue Rangers, a 2022 Emmy Award-winning film by Akiva Schaffer based on the 1989 animated series of the same name and featuring pop cultural crossovers.
- Pop culture fiction
