= The Sex Lives of College Girls =

2021 American teen comedy-drama television series

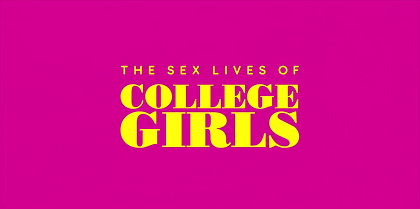
- Genre: Comedy drama; Teen drama; Sex comedy
- Created by: Mindy Kaling & Justin Noble
- Showrunners: Mindy Kaling; Justin Noble
- Starring: Pauline Chalamet; Amrit Kaur; Reneé Rapp; Alyah Chanelle Scott; Gavin Leatherwood; Christopher Meyer; Ilia Isorelýs Paulino; Renika Williams; Lauren "Lolo" Spencer; Midori Francis; Mekki Leeper; Mitchell Slaggert; Mia Rodgers; Gracie Lawrence
- Music by: Joseph Stephens
- Country of origin: United States
- Original language: English
- No. of seasons: 3
- No. of episodes: 30

Production
- Executive producers: Mindy Kaling; Justin Noble; Howard Klein; Charlie Grandy; Matt Warburton; David Gordon Green; Jessica Kumai Scott; Michael Spiller
- Producers: Bonnie Muñoz; Caroline Goldfarb; Rheeqrheeq Chainey; Wileen Dragovan
- Cinematography: Rick Page; Chuck Ozeas; David Miller; JP Wakayama
- Editors: Mat Greenleaf; Kyla Plewes; Iris Hershner; Giselle Murillo; Kelsey Myers; Jonathan Pledger; Jessica Sisk; Yasmin Assemi
- Camera setup: Single-camera
- Running time: 22–51 minutes
- Production companies: Kaling International; 3 Arts Entertainment; Warner Bros. Television

Original release
- Network: HBO Max
- Release: November 18, 2021 – December 15, 2022
- Network: Max
- Release: November 21, 2024 – January 23, 2025

The Sex Lives of College Girls is an American teen comedy-drama television series created by Mindy Kaling and Justin Noble, which premiered on HBO Max on November 18, 2021. In December 2021, the series was renewed for a second season, which premiered on November 17, 2022. In December 2022, the series was renewed for a third season, which premiered on November 21, 2024. In March 2025, the series was canceled after three seasons.

== Premise ==
The series follows the lives of four 18-year-old freshmen roommates at the fictional Essex College in Vermont, covering their sexually-active lifestyle as they deal with the struggles and hardships of college and adulthood.

== Cast and characters ==
=== Main ===
- Pauline Chalamet as Kimberly Finkle, a freshman who is a working student from Gilbert, Arizona, a small town that is predominantly white, and comes from a poor family
- Amrit Kaur as Bela Malhotra, an Indian American freshman from Nutley, New Jersey, who wants to become a comedy writer and is sex-positive
- Reneé Rapp as Leighton Murray, (Note: Rapp is only in the first two episodes of the third season before departing the series.) a freshman and a wealthy legacy student from New York City who is a lesbian and trying to live up to her mother's high expectations
- Alyah Chanelle Scott as Whitney Chase, a freshman and wealthy star soccer player from Seattle who is having an affair with her assistant soccer coach and is the daughter of a U.S. senator
- Gavin Leatherwood as Nico Murray (season 1), (Note: Gavin Leatherwood does not appear in 1x04 and is not credited.) Leighton's older brother and Kimberly's love interest
- Christopher Meyer as Canaan, (Note: Christopher Meyer does not appear in 1x02, 1x03, 1x06, 2x03, 2x05, 3x02 and 3x05 and is not credited.) Kimberly's co-worker and Whitney's love interest
- Ilia Isorelýs Paulino as Lila, (Note: Ilia Isorelýs Paulino does not appear in 1x02, 1x06, 1x09, 2x03, 2x05, 3x05 and 3x08 and is not credited.) Kimberly's coworker
- Renika Williams as Willow, (Note: Renika Williams does not appear in 1x06, 1x07, 2x03, 2x04, 3x03 and 3x04 and is not credited.) one of Whitney's teammates
- Lauren "Lolo" Spencer as Jocelyn, (Note: Lauren "Lolo" Spencer does not appear in 1x04, 1x07, 1x08, 2x02, 2x05, 2x06, 2x09, 3x01, 3x03, 3x04, 3x05, 3x07, 3x08, 3x09 and 3x10 and is not credited.) a partygoing student at Essex and housemate of the main characters
- Midori Francis as Alicia (seasons 1, 3; guest season 2), (Note: Midori Francis is credited as a series regular from the third through the tenth episode of the first season, and in the first episode of the third season.) Leighton's love interest
- Mekki Leeper as Eric (season 2; recurring season 1), (Note: Mekki Leeper is credited as a series regular from the first through the seventh episode of the second season.) a writer for The Catullan
- Mitchell Slaggert as Jackson (season 2), (Note: Mitchell Slaggert is credited as a series regular from the first through the ninth episode of the second season.) a new student from Kansas who bonds with Kimberly
- Mia Rodgers as Taylor (season 3), (Note: Mia Rodgers does not appear in 3x04 and is not credited.) an openly queer first year student at Essex College from Mayfair, London
- Gracie Lawrence as Kacey (season 3), (Note: Gracie Lawrence is credited as a series regular from the third episode.) the girls' new roommate who recently transferred from Duke University and is part of the theater department

=== Recurring ===
- Rob Huebel as Henry, Leighton and Nico's father
- Nicole Sullivan as Carol, Kimberly's mother
- James Morosini as Dalton (season 1), Whitney's assistant soccer coach
- Kavi Ramachandran Ladnier as Reena (seasons 1, 3), Bela's mother
- Craig Cackowski as Dale, Kimberly's father
- Stephen Guarino as Roger (season 1; guest season 2), the Sips manager
- Jillian Armenante as Coach Woods (season 1), Whitney's head soccer coach
- Conor Donnally as Ryan (season 1), a writer for The Catullan
- Sierra Katow as Evangeline (seasons 1–2), a writer for The Catullan
- Maya Rose as Jena (season 1; guest season 2), Whitney's antagonistic teammate who later becomes her friend
- Sherri Shepherd as Evette (seasons 1–2; guest season 3), Whitney's mother and a U.S. senator from Washington
- Betti as Trish/Travis, a gay student who lives in the dorm and later comes out as a trans woman
- Cheyenne Perez as Jo (seasons 1–2), a writer for The Catullan
- Scott Lipman as Frude (seasons 1–2; guest season 3), the residence director of the dorm
- Isabella Roland as Carla (seasons 1–2; guest season 3), a fellow writer for The Catullan
- Amanda Ripley as Ginger
- Vico Ortiz as Tova
- Gedde Watanabe as Professor Harpin (season 2; guest season 1), Bela and Whitney's biochemistry teacher
- Donielle Nash as Jayla, a friend of Whitney's
- Aketra Sevillian as Zoe (season 2), an employee at Sips
- Charlie Hall as Andrew Fuller (season 2), Bela and Whitney's biochemistry classmate
- Gracie Dzienny as Tatum (season 2), Leighton's new love interest
- Devin Craig as Isaiah (season 3), a classmate of Whitney and Kimberly, whom Whitney somewhat peruses romantically
- Courtney Parchman as Blair (season 3), a member of Kappa who is part of the theater production
- Zoe Lam as Rina (season 3), a tough soccer player who overshadows and bullies Whitney
- Michael Provost as Eli (season 3), a bisexual, rave and drug enjoying student who Kimberly briefly dates
- Nabeel Muscatwalla as Arvind (season 3), a fellow FAF with Bela who helps her out and she takes an interest in
- Xosha Roquemore as Professor Phillips (season 3), Kimberly and Whitney's African American studies professor
- Rebecca Wisocky as Professor Dorfmann (season 3), the professor for the theater department
- Roby Attal as Cooper (season 3), a student at Essex who is part of the theater production alongside Kacey
- Tig Notaro as Professor Friedman (season 3), Kimberly's law professor
- Ruby Cruz as Ash (season 3), Taylor's love interest
- Michael Hsu Rosen as Brian (season 3), a classmate of Kimberly from the law symposium
- Jeremy Culhane as Lars (season 3), another classmate of Kimberly from the law symposium
- Brandon Keener as Coach Hale (season 3), Whitney's strict soccer coach

== Episodes ==
=== Series overview ===
Season	Episodes	Originally released		
Season	Episodes	First released	Last released	Network
1	10	November 18, 2021	December 9, 2021	HBO Max
2	10	November 17, 2022	December 15, 2022	HBO Max
3	10	November 21, 2024	January 23, 2025	Max

=== Season 1 (2021) ===
No. overall	No. in season	Title	Directed by	Written by	Original release date	Prod. code
1	1	"Welcome to Essex"	David Gordon Green	Mindy Kaling & Justin Noble	November 18, 2021	T40.10301
Kimberly, Bela, Whitney and Leighton arrive at Essex College and become roommates. However, each has a hard time trying to adjust: Kimberly gets dumped by her boyfriend Max the morning after the two make love. Bela wants to join The Catullan, an exclusive yet predominantly sexist comedy magazine, but is brushed off by Eric, one of the main coeditors. Bela gives six handjobs in order to earn a spot, but as a result inadvertently earning her the ire of Evangeline, the girlfriend of one of the editors. Whitney joins the all-female soccer team, but her teammates, especially Jena, behave hostile towards her, believing that she only got here as a senator's daughter and secretly has an affair with her coach assistant Dalton, before finding out that he is married. Leighton, initially wary of the trio and cut off by her two best friends, is forced to give them a chance after being encouraged by her older brother, Nico. She is later revealed to be a closeted lesbian. Whitney hooks up with Canaan, Kimberly's coworker at Sips.
2	2	"Naked Party"	Zoe Cassavetes	Ali Liebegott & Caroline Goldfarb	November 18, 2021	T40.10302
Kimberly's first day of class goes sour as she doesn't know how to properly speak French. Whitney confronts Dalton for not telling her about his marriage, which he claims is an unhappy one. Willow informs Whitney that Jena uninvited her to a party for the soccer team. Whitney goes anyway, walking in on Jena and her boyfriend arguing; she confides in Whitney that he broke up with her as he couldn't handle her team's schedule. Whitney comforts her and they become friends. Bela and Kimberly go to a naked party where Bela once again runs into Evangeline, who reveals that she had campaigned in favor of her submission, despite her immoral actions to get accepted. Leighton abruptly leaves Chloe, her hookup, when she inquires about her sexuality, then goes on a night-long bender, and receives a call from a concerned Chloe, whom Leighton blows off before furiously throwing a tequila bottle at a statue of the college's founder and getting chased off by campus security for it.
3	3	"Le Tuteur"	Zoe Cassavetes	Rupinder Gill	November 25, 2021	T40.10303
Leighton unsuccessfully attempts to get off the hook by bribing President Lacey, who assigns her 100 hours of community service at the Essex women's center as punishment, which she reluctantly accepts, but finds herself clashing with Alicia, the volunteers' overseer. Bela tries to seek dating attractive boys with abs. After hitting it off with one and having sex, however, Bela realizes that he only likes her because she's funny but still sees him for sex. She also gets accused for a stinking fridge, which she denies, but when Kimberly reveals that all of the food was smelling horridly as she cleans it up herself, Bela quickly remembers that she had forgotten to plug it back the previous day. Nico and Kimberly bond as he tutors her in French. Whitney pressures Dalton into divorcing his wife, promising to do so while they are in the woods for a movie night and giving her evidence of a message to ease her up. However, Dalton reneges on his promise as his wife happily greets him, with Whitney in the dark about this.
4	4	"Kappa"	Kabir Akhtar	Charlie Grandy & Beth Appel	November 25, 2021	T40.10304
Whitney and Leighton attend a Kappa branch. Quinn, the president of the sorority, pairs Leighton up with Cory, Nico's friend, when she uses him as a beard to hide her sexuality. Bela meets alumnus Danny Marawitz, hoping that he accepts to be her mentor. However, after Danny makes a sexist joke about Bela, she angrily tells him what she really thinks about him, resulting in Danny storming out of the event and calling off a donation check meant for The Catullan. Another alumni, who overheard the entire exchange and spent years despising Danny for making jokes about him being gay, thanks Bela for what she did and offers to match half of his donation for the magazine, much to Bela's delight. Whitney travels with the soccer team for the tournament and settle in at a hotel. Willow finds out about the affair through a shirtless picture of Dalton, but Whitney, knowing this would cost Dalton's job and her mother's reputation as senator, makes her promise not to tell anyone. Kimberly sees a comment Nico posted on her dress' photo.
5	5	"That Comment Tho"	Rachel Raimist	Matt Warburton & Sheridan Watson	November 25, 2021	T40.10305
Kimberly shows the comment to Bela and Whitney but Nico deletes it, confusing her. Whitney takes it upon herself to end the discrimination against female athletes by investigating the boys' luxurious locker room to obtain proof, only to get caught by Hayden, one of the teammates. Coach Woods benches Whitney for two games as punishment. Leighton invites the girls from the women's center to Nico's frat party and agree to give it a try despite their opinions of frat houses. Bela crashes a Catullan soiree she wasn't invited to where she meets Ryan, Eric's colleague, who is on good terms with her. However, Bela leaves early after Ryan shows her a porn video he describes as "funny". During the party, Whitney bumps into Hayden and they do a treadmill race challenge that she wins. Leighton stops Alicia from beating up a guy that insulted her; Alicia, thinking that she is straight, calls Leighton out over the injustice, until Leighton proves her wrong by kissing her. As Nico walks Kimberly home, he tells her that he deleted the comment to make sure that no one would get the wrong idea about them. Dalton breaks up with Whitney, who in response throws a rock at his car as he drives off.
6	6	"Parents Weekend"	Meredith Dawson	Mindy Kaling & Justin Noble	December 2, 2021	T40.10306
The girls' parents arrive at Essex college for the Parents' Weekend and they head out to have dinner together. However, the entire meeting proves to be awkward as secrets start to pop up and egos clash with one another. Bela is caught by her parents lying about taking neuroscience courses in order to become a doctor and are disappointed when she tells them that she wants to be a comedy writer. Whitney still refuses to approach her mother and misses her father, who does not show up and is insulted by Leighton's parents, who are called out by Evette for their nosiness. Kimberly panics about her mother being unable to pay for the dinner due to their poor background and insists that Leighton pay for it, but the ruse is discovered. After the dinner, Whitney thanks her mother for defending her father, but she acknowledges that Leighton's parents were right about him and tells Whitney that one day she will have to drop her hero worship of him. Despite their anger, Bela's mother is understanding of her daughter's passion and promises that they will support her as long as she focuses more on her studies. Carol tells Kimberly not to be ashamed of who she is. Nico and Kimberly kiss.
7	7	"I Think I'm a Sex Addict"	Lila Neugebauer	Rupinder Gill & Vanessa Baden Kelly	December 2, 2021	T40.10307
Kimberly starts seeing Nico regularly for sex, keeping their affair a secret from Leighton but also causing her to fall behind her Econ classes and show up late for work. With her grades slipping, Lila, Kimberly's other coworker, advises her to ask Professor Bennett for extra credit; she does, but when he leaves her to do a difficult assignment, Kimberly is once again tempted by Nico, this time having sex in Bennett's office until they get caught, resulting in Kimberly losing her extra credit. Nico offers Kimberly a ton of old exams his frat house has been keeping to help her pass. Leighton finds out about Whitney's affair with Dalton, becoming her second secret-keeper, and gives her love advice as she starts reconnecting with Canaan. Ryan once again makes sexual advances toward Bela, who officially becomes a member of The Catullan. Leighton starts getting along with the women's center group while making official her relationship with Alicia. Leighton is contacted by Maya, whom she reveals as Nico's girlfriend.
8	8	"The Surprise Party"	Maggie Carey	Charlie Grandy & Kristen Zublin	December 2, 2021	T40.10308
Leighton hosts a surprise party for Nico's 21'st birthday and invites Maya, which upsets Kimberly when she finds out he kept this from her. Whitney shoots a winning goal that gets her team to the NCAA tournament, but her future is on the line as Coach Woods informs her that Dalton has been sleeping with a teammate, asking her if she knows anything about it. After initially taking a low profile, she decides to come clean to Coach Woods, who doesn't rat her out, but at the cost of her and Dalton losing their jobs. Bela and Carla, another fellow Catullan writer, get paired up to write a piece on their first day. Carla confides in Bela that Ryan has been sexually inappropriate toward her, but she brushes it off out of fear. After Carla resigns from The Catullan, Bela realizes that she silenced her and tells Leighton. She calls Alicia for help, assuring Bela and Carla that she's on their side.
9	9	"Cheating"	Kabir Akhtar	Caroline Goldfarb & Beth Appel	December 9, 2021	T40.10309
Kimberly ponders on whether to cheat her Econ exam. Despite Canaan warning her against it, she does cheat, using her urinary tract infection as an excuse, but is eventually caught by professor Bennett. Having found out about their affair, Leighton threatens to tell Maya about Nico's infidelity unless he apologizes to Kimberly. Bela reports Ryan's sexual assault on her and Carla to Evangeline and Eric; while Evangeline believes her, Eric callously criticizes her. Nevertheless, Eric later apologizes for his previous behavior, promising to settle the matter himself. Whitney takes full responsibility for Dalton and Woods' firings, but her team assure she's not to blame. Leighton and Alicia go to an escapade together. However, Leighton's refusal to come out of the closet results in Alicia breaking up with her. Finding out from Kimberly that he never talked to her, Leighton stays true to her word and tells Maya that Nico cheated on her, without naming Kimberly as the culprit.
10	10	"The Truth"	Liza Johnson	Justin Noble & Rupinder Gill	December 9, 2021	T40.10310
Maya has broken up with Nico, whom Leighton berates for bringing this misfortune on himself. Kimberly faces a potential expulsion from Essex for violating the honor code. She steals the old tests from Theta and is caught by Nico, who instead allows her to turn them in to the Honor Board to further help her case. Eric kicks Ryan out of The Catullan for what he did to Bela and Carla, but Bela, Evangeline and Jo, having had enough of its toxic rape culture when a rift forms over Ryan's dismissal, decide to quit and start their own magazine. Senator Chase visits Whitney to make sure that the girl who was with Dalton is fine. Whitney uses Willow, who is a lesbian, as a scapegoat and her mother easily falls for it. Despite this, Whitney does tell the truth to her mother, who blames herself for being so strict to her that Whitney thought she had to hide things from her and the two reconcile. Depressed over Alicia, Leighton finally comes out to Kimberly, who supports her. While they are having lunch together, Kimberly receives an e-mail from the board, announcing that she is not expelled, but her scholarship was revoked for her actions, so she will have to pay her tuitions if she is to stay.

=== Season 2 (2022) ===
No. overall	No. in season	Title	Directed by	Written by	Original release date	Prod. code
11	1	"Winter Is Coming"	Daniella Eisman	Caroline Goldfarb	November 17, 2022	T40.10401
Kimberly, Bela, Leighton and Whitney arrive back at Essex shortly after the Thanksgiving break. Kimberly, trying to compensate her lost scholarship, requests a loan at the loan office with Leighton's help, but since she hasn't told her parents about the scholarship, she turns it down after she is told that they need to co-sign. Bela has a rough start at her new female magazine as she is unimpressed with the applicants' dull submissions and turns to Eric for advice, telling her to find people who are funny like her. Whitney feels dejected when she is unable to find any common interest aside from soccer and overhears Canaan, who she is now dating, saying how it's the only thing she has in her life. Kimberly meets Jackson, a climate change refugee from Kansas, and they exchange phone numbers. Some disgruntled Theta members take their anger out on the girls for telling on Nico and other Theta seniors over the stolen exams and ban them from attending their parties. Leighton comes out to Bela and Whitney. Bela and Eric kiss.
12	2	"Frat Problems"	Daniella Eisman	Rupinder Gill	November 17, 2022	T40.10402
In order to get back in the frats' good graces, Bela and Leighton host a sex-positive strip show that will help raise money for climate change. However, when Dean Miller finds out, she attempts to shut it down; Bela has Jackson use his tragic story as a climate refugee, with Leighton adding that they've raised $11,000. Convinced, Miller allows the event to take place as long as it ends by midnight, thus earning them Theta's respect back. Whitney is jealous of Zoe, Canaan's new coworker at Sips, but he promises that there is nothing going on between them and apologizes for what he said before about Whitney's interests. Kimberly arranges to have her loan co-signed by Professor Hennessey, who invites her over to a small dinner party at her home where she is housing an exchange student. The next day, Hennessey informs Kimberly that she can't cosign her loan because her accountant believes that it would affect her credit score, but when Kimberly assumes that it's because of her husband making sexual advances, she apologizes, shocking Hennessey, who angrily confronts her husband over the phone for what he did as Kimberly leaves her office, ashamed.
13	3	"The Short King"	Lila Neugebauer	Sarah Tapscott	November 24, 2022	T40.10403
Bela and Whitney enroll in a biochemistry class, especially Whitney, who wants to explore new challenges and achieve great things out of it. After they fail a hard test, Bela insists they should drop it, but Whitney, not giving up, encourages for both of them to stay, while also dealing with arrogant classmate, Andrew. Bela draws the attention of Wes, (Note: Played by Igby Rigney) a short gym member whom she has occasional trysts with, and compares them to her sexual relationship with Eric when writing an article about it. Kimberly spots a pamphlet to sell eggs, seeing it as a mean to pay her college tuitions. Kimberly is initially hesitant about it but, after Jackson tells her about his own difficulties, she eventually decides to contact the fertility center. Leighton has multiple sexual encounters with girls at Essex but finds herself in the middle of a conflict with two of her former partners, who happen to be each other's exes, with a third popping up who also dated one of them. Whitney rushes to her defense and demands that Leighton be left alone. Later on, while she is in the restroom, Leighton feels intense pain. To Leighton's shock, the doctor informs her that she tested positive for chlamydia.
14	4	"Will You Be My Girlfriend?"	Lila Neugebauer	Rheeqrheeq Chainey	November 24, 2022	T40.10404
Bela tampers with the final cover of The Catullan by putting a QR code that leads to the website of The Foxy instead, angering Eric, who hacks into her magazine's website and sabotages it in retaliation, instigating a competition between Bela and Eric. Jackson sets Kimberly up with Fred, a nerdy classmate who has a crush on her, for a literature study session, although Kimberly doesn't reciprocate his advances. Canaan asks Whitney if she'll be his girlfriend, but she becomes suspicious as she thought they were already a couple. Motivated by her jealousy of Zoe and taking some poor advice from the Kappas, Whitney goes through Canaan's phone to find a text from her. When she confronts him, the upset Canaan states that he only rejected Zoe gently and breaks up with Whitney for her inability to trust him. As Leighton awaits results, Natalie, one of her hookups, confronts her for giving her chlamydia, but when she rudely dismisses and has her shunned by everyone to save face, Natalie publicly exposes Leighton, forcing her to come clean to Quinn during deliberations. Despite their misfortunes, Leighton and Whitney are both accepted into Kappa.
15	5	"Taking Shots"	Thembi Banks	Justin Noble & Sheridan Watson	December 1, 2022	T40.10405
Leighton helps Kimberly out with her hormone injections during Theta's themed parties and takes her to the hospital for a procedure. Noticing her constantly watching the livestream of a math hackathon, Kimberly convinces Leighton to go and help two students from her math seminar win. However, Kimberly, not feeling well, goes to the restroom, accidentally locking herself out of the room, and Jackson allows her to rest in his room until Whitney arrives and picks her up. Bela is triggered with jealousy upon meeting Dana, Eric's date and her Catullan replacement, causing her to realize that she likes him and declares her feelings for him, which Eric reciprocates. Whitney is annoyed when the biochemistry TA keeps mistaking her for Mariah, the only other black girl in class. When she tries to correct him, he cries assuring he's not being racist, and later he tries to demonstrate it, but Whitney makes it clear she wants their relationship to be student-TA only. Leighton runs into Tatum, a girl resembling her.
16	6	"Doppelbanger"	David Stassen	Mindy Kaling	December 1, 2022	T40.10406
Leighton tracks Tatum down and tries to talk to her, but she is shown to be more judgmental than she is, leaving Leighton embarrassed. After running into her once again, Leighton puts Tatum in her place, which impresses her and gives Leighton her number. Whitney and Andrew are partnered up together for a biochemistry assignment. He rudely dismisses Whitney and wants to do all the work himself, but he eventually allows her to help after she notices a mistake he made. After the Sips manager is fired, Kimberly encourages Lila to apply for the job. Despite being unsure since she is afraid of job interviews, Lila manages to overcome it, resulting in her becoming the new manager. The girls tease Kimberly for being "med-zoned" by Jackson. In response, she goes to Jackson to tell him he doesn't have to keep worrying about her health; they later have sex. Bela prepares to be stand-up comedian Dan O'Conell's official student liaison and hopes to impress him so he'll later consider her for an unpaid comedy internship. However, Eric also takes an interest in Dan. In response, Bela goes to Dan's hotel room and initiates sex with him to win the internship over Eric.
17	7	"The Essex College Food Workers Strike"	Tazbah Chavez	Beth Appel	December 8, 2022	T40.10407
Kimberly, Canaan, and later Lila go on strike because the food workers have not gotten a pay raise for decades, bringing Senator Chase in to help them out. The rally has a great turnout until she gets lambasted on social media for quoting the Essex founder, a slave owner. Senator Chase wants to leave, but Kimberly convinces her to give her speech standing up for student workers' rights, forcing the administration to agree to the union's demands. Bela is in hot water when Eric finds out that she had sex with Dan and breaks up with her; he also calls Bela out for her obsession with wanting to be liked no matter what she has. Bela starts reflecting on her actions. Tatum asks Leighton out on a date, but she lies to her, thinking that Tatum is cooler than she is. However, the host of a party who knows Tatum accidentally gives her away. After admitting why she lied, Tatum tells Leighton that she already liked her and they kiss. Evette visits Whitney, who turns down an internship she's got for her, wanting to get one on her own, but she apologizes for sounding ungrateful. Nonetheless, she is understanding and has faith in her daughter. Whitney and Andrew kiss.
18	8	"Pre-Frosh Weekend"	Tazbah Chavez	Sarah Tapscott & Modupe Thompson	December 8, 2022	T40.10408
Bela hosts her best friend Priya for Essex's Pre-Frosh Weekend. However, she is shocked to see that Priya is a lot cooler than she used to be. Priya gets invited to a party, leading Bela to intervene and plan her own party at her dorm. When she stands her up, Bela confronts Priya, who explains that she wanted to reinvent herself and not be remembered as "the nerdy girl", having chosen to attend Essex for her. Whitney has casual sex with Andrew despite trying to end it. They also have sex in the library, where Canaan accidentally walks in on them. Kimberly unsuccessfully tries finding common ground with Jackson, who doesn't want to date people who share his interests. Leighton's father comes to visit and she initially decides against coming out to him as things are rough back home for her family, but at the last minute, she does after an awkward dinner with Tatum and their fathers. Leighton's father excuses himself and she goes to check on him; he laments about how he's never been a good parent to notice this, but he's proud of her and supports her relationship with Tatum. While making out with Tatum, Alicia, Leighton's ex-girlfriend, texts her, asking to meet up.
19	9	"Sex & Basketball"	Rupinder Gill	Rupinder Gill & Caroline Goldfarb	December 15, 2022	T40.10409
A writer of the Essex View stops by at The Foxy and Bela curates everything the magazine needs for its featured write-up in an article. However, she notices that it's largely focused on her, but Bela, still determined to earn the spotlight, tells him to publish the article as it is. With Tatum's consent, Leighton visits Alicia at the women's center. She invites Leighton to a fundraiser the center is hosting, asking her to bring Tatum along. When Tatum openly insults the women's center, Leighton breaks up with her, realizing that she wants to change the things they have in common with each other. Andrew and Whitney go on an awkward date at a restaurant. When Andrew suggests another date, Whitney distracts him with a basketball game and the two later sleep together, but Andrew insists they're exclusive, which puts Whitney off. Canaan is honored by the Economics department with the Economic Young Entrepreneur Award and Kimberly encourages him to attend the banquet with her. He receives the award, which also praises his work for Alzheimer people, his mother included. Realizing she has feelings for Canaan, Kimberly goes to Jackson to break up with him.
20	10	"The Rooming Lottery"	Justin Noble	Justin Noble & Beth Appel	December 15, 2022	T40.10410
As the freshman year is coming to an end, Leighton and Bela are set to move out of the dorm to live with the Kappas and The Foxy staff respectively, with Kimberly and Whitney agreeing to room together. Whitney breaks up with Andrew. Leighton decides to quit Kappa, as she doesn't feel like herself anymore, and rekindles her relationship with Alicia, as well as giving her a 30,000 dollar check initially meant for Kappa, saving the women's center which funding had been cut in half by Essex. Having found out about Bela's role in the article and her bluntly telling an aspiring writer to quit comedy, Evangeline and Jo fire her from The Foxy, as well as barring her from moving in with them. Lila warns Kimberly against acting on her feelings for Canaan. However, after Kimberly finds out that Canaan lied about inviting Zoe to the banquet, she runs after him and kisses him after Canaan admits to wanting Kimberly to go with him. Unbeknownst to them, they are seen by Whitney, who reneges on her decision to room again with Kimberly and instead moves to Kappa house for the time being. Out of guilt for her recent actions, Bela requests a transfer to another school.

=== Season 3 (2024–25) ===
No. overall	No. in season	Title	Directed by	Written by	Original release date	Prod. code
21	1	"Welcome Back to Essex"	MJ Delaney	Mindy Kaling & Justin Noble	November 21, 2024	T40.10501
As the sophomore year begins, Whitney has been ignoring Kimberly during the summer after finding out about her and Canaan, with Kimberly unsuccessfully trying to apologize to her. Bela's request to transfer schools is rejected due to her low GPA, causing her to decide to take a break from comedy and undergo a personality overhaul; Frude, the residence director, quits his job after contracting pneumonia and Bela takes over, but her attempts at being friendly are met with resistance by everyone, including English freshman Taylor. However, Bela reconsiders after successfully carrying out an intervention between Kimberly and Whitney, who forgives her. Canaan and Kimberly also realize that their relationship is not meant to be and agree to remain friends for Whitney's sake. Leighton grapples with Alicia leaving Essex for a job opportunity in Boston and her math class being cancelled due to lack of enrollment, until her professor informs her about a math program at MIT, which happens to also be in Boston, lifting her spirits.
22	2	"Lila by Lila"	MJ Delaney	Sarah Tapscott	November 28, 2024	T40.10502
The girls find themselves uncomfortable in their triple room after Whitney quits from Kappa. Kimberly applies for a quad, which is eventually approved and finds herself attracted to Eli, the housing clerk. Whitney bluntly tells Isaiah that she is not interested in dating rich guys after finding out that he is one, leading to an intense discussion. Later on, Whitney apologizes to Isaiah, but still remains firm on her decision to remain single in order to focus on soccer and her studies. Taylor continues challenging Bela in her Friendly Advisor and Friend (FAF) job, even reporting her through a false accusation of bigotry for being queer and Wiccan that lands her in sensitivity training classes. After she is hospitalized for alcohol poisoning, Taylor pleads Bela to help her, revealing that she relapsed while trying to stay sober for a year. Leighton's math professor informs her that she has been accepted at MIT and is due to start classes next week. Leighton thanks her friends for giving her the courage to be herself and spends one last night with them before departing for Boston in the morning. Kimberly, Bela and Whitney enter to find that they have a new roommate.
23	3	"Four to a Suite"	Michael Spiller	Rupinder Gill & Vanessa Baden Kelly	December 5, 2024	T40.10503
Kimberly talks to Eli about having never dated a bi guy before, but she finds out that his regular taste is different from who she is. Kimberly visits a sex shop for the first time, but her attempt at being more adventurous ends disastrously when Eli says he is not into those things. Kimberly apologizes to Eli, who accepts her just as she is. Bela states that she is not sexually attracted to nice guys when she befriends Arvind, another FAF, until she changes her mind when he does the Heimlich maneuver on Carla. Learning he has a girlfriend, Taylor advises Bela to send a provocative text to Arvind and then claim it was meant to someone else. Whitney inadvertently insults her professor as she rejects African-American studies as a major. After Whitney is called in class while not paying attention, she thinks that the professor hates her and drops her class, before she clarifies the whole misunderstanding. The girls meet Kacey, their new roommate, who had transferred to Essex to be close to her boyfriend Calvin. However, when they see him kissing another girl, they tip Kacey off, who angrily breaks up with him. Kacey thanks the girls for supporting her and they become friends.
24	4	"Franklin the Fox"	Michael Spiller	Caroline Goldfarb	December 12, 2024	T40.10504
Bela develops a crush on Essex's mascot, Franklin the Fox, and has sex with him to try to get over Arvind, to no avail. Soon afterwards, Arvind informs Bela that he broke up with Emily. Sips gets delivery robots from the administration, which Canaan and Lila oppose as they would replace the human employees, so they hide them in response. Kimberly, not wanting her aspirations of becoming a Supreme Court Justice to be tarnished, reveals the deception, upsetting Lila. Later, Kimberly and Eli go to a rave, where Kimberly accidentally gets high on MDMA and loses sight of him. Lila comes to pick Kimberly up and reassures her that making mistakes does not make her a bad person. Whitney juggles with school and football, while maintaining a no-strings-attached relationship with Isaiah and declines seeking therapy. Kacey goes for the lead role in Essex's upcoming fall musical, where she meets a guy named Cooper. Despite a successful audition, Professor Dorfmann gives Kacey a small part of "old woman" instead.
25	5	"Parents Weekend 2"	Gail Mancuso	David Phillips	December 19, 2024	T40.10505
The Parents' Weekend arrives once again and the girls do everything they can to stop their parents from digging into their dating lives. Bela lies to Arvind about her parents not coming due to being uncomfortable with them wanting to know more about his ancestry and invites Taylor to tag along when her own parents do not show up. Kimberly reluctantly invites Eli on her mother's wishes when she shows interest in knowing him, until she breaks up with him and agree to remain friends as they have very different lives. Whitney discovers that her father is using a dating app and Kimberly accidentally swipes right on him. Kacey has not told her mother about the breakup with Calvin. When Kacey finally confesses, she starts blaming her daughter, but her roommates and Taylor stand up for her. After getting caught on her lie, Bela's parents assure her that they no longer disapprove her decisions, nor Arvind. Kacey's mother apologizes to her. Whitney's father clarifies that he is using the dating app to look for a long-term relationship, inspiring Whitney to ask Isaiah out on a date. Bela apologizes to Arvind for lying to him and he kisses her.
26	6	"Halloween & Oat Milk"	Steven Canals	Beth Appel	December 26, 2024	T40.10506
Taylor has been sleeping over at the girls' dorm due to issues with her roommate. Bela tries to get Taylor a girlfriend by taking her to a queer speed dating event, which she rebuffs, causing Bela to lash out at her for annoying her friends with her mean-spirited behavior. Bela later apologizes to Taylor, who reveals that she has a crush on her roommate, whom she cannot pursue as she is heterosexual; Bela allows her to move back in. Kacey goes on a date with Cooper, but is conflicted on whether or not to tell him that she is a virgin. She ultimately tells Cooper, who accepts it. Kimberly struggles to fit in at Professor Friedman's law symposium that is male-dominated, leading her to accidentally intimidate her classmate Steve in his attempt to undermine her. Not backing down, Kimberly manages to turn the tables on him, earning the respect of her classmates and Friedman. Whitney tries to stay friends with Canaan while also dating Isaiah and chooses to take a cortisone shot after injuring her knee during a soccer game.
27	7	"The Rodeo"	Thembi L. Banks	Modupe Thompson	January 2, 2025	T40.10507
Kacey is shocked to find out that she has not been featured on Essex's "50 hottest students" magazine and does everything in her power to be in it. Cooper helps her out at the last minute by having a controversial student removed and recommending Kacey as a replacement. Bela attempts to break her dry spell with Arvind. Kimberly starts spending time with Brian, one of her classmates, and they enter a relationship, despite Professor Friedman advising them against it. Taylor suspects that Chloe might actually like her romantically and invites her to the queer rodeo party to try to make a move on Chloe. However, Chloe does not reciprocate Taylor's feelings when she kisses her. Taylor encounters Ash again. Whitney finds out that Isaiah had her lab funded by his billionaire father's company and is uncomfortable as she feels like she owes him. Whitney meets up with Canaan and kisses him.
28	8	"The Good Partner Test"	Courtney M. Franklin	Rupinder Gill & Sarah Tapscott	January 9, 2025	T40.10508
Bela, Kacey, Whitney, and Kimberly put their boyfriends through "the good partner test" without them knowing it so they can find out if they are good matches. While Arvind, Cooper, and Brian (the only one who sees through their ruse) pass, however, Isaiah does not, which leads Whitney to tell her roommates that she had kissed Canaan, whom Whitney secretly invited and he passes the test as well. After Brian's inquiry on the girls' exes, Kacey, who could not give an answer to his question, goes to talk to Calvin about the real reason why he cheated on her to get some closure and texts Cooper, telling him that she is ready to have sex. Bela and Arvind try to have sex, but Bela unintentionally ruins the moment after she confesses to Arvind that she had slept with twenty people. Whitney gets reprimanded via text message by her coach for skipping football practice.
29	9	"Pics"	Rupinder Gill	David Phillips & Beth Appel	January 16, 2025	T40.10509
Kimberly sends Brian some nude pictures of herself. However, she learns that she had accidentally sent a live photo with her face visible. Brian gets defensive when Kimberly asks him to delete it and gaslights her into thinking that she is overreacting about the issue. Later, Kimberly and Lila coerce Brian into deleting all copies of the photo. Whitney decides to prioritize her mental health and consults a therapist; she requests a day off from soccer to Coach Hale, who refuses, causing her to quit the team in protest. Kacey tries to have sex with Cooper, who is hesitant. Cooper later admits to Kacey that he was scared of the responsibility of taking her virginity. Bela signs up for a storytelling show, but breaks up with Arvind, who expresses discomfort at Bela wanting to publicly share her sex life. Taylor moves in with Ash, despite Bela's objections. Learning that her estranged mother is getting married the next day, Taylor tries to call Bela, who blows her off to focus on the show. Taylor buys a vodka bottle to cope with the news.
30	10	"Essex Strong"	Justin Noble	Justin Noble & Caroline Goldfarb	January 23, 2025	T40.10510
The athletic board demands that Whitney return to the team, leading Willow and other teammates to speak up against Coach Hale's abuse of power. Kimberly joins a protest against a hateful speaker coming to Essex, where she encounters Eli, despite Professor Friedman advising her against taking part. After the protest gets interrupted by campus police, Kimberly, alongside its leader Noah and a few others, sneaks into the college's I.T. room and successfully prevents the speaker's livestream, but they all get caught and arrested. Eli arrives to bail Kimberly out. Bela realizes she is bisexual when she kisses Haley, the storytelling show host. However, when Bela is about to come out during her comedy performance, she chickens out at the last second when her mother shows up. Taylor reveals that she never drank the vodka bottle and thanks Bela for helping her out and gives her some advice regarding her mother. Cooper breaks up with Kacey for impulsively arranging for him to meet her family and is comforted by her roommates. Later on, the girls watch Kacey perform Never Enough at the musical, despite initially giving up the lead role because of Cooper, during which Bela holds Haley's hand as a way to come out to her mom, who silently approves. Taylor also contacts her mother via videocall to try to reconcile with her.

== Production ==
=== Development ===
The series was first announced at the HBO Max presentation in October 2019, under the working title College Girls. It was given a straight-to-series order of 13 half-hour episodes with Mindy Kaling announced to create, write, showrun, and executive produce the series under her overall deal with Warner Bros. Television. In May 2020, the series was confirmed to be launching in 2021, under the new title The Sex Lives of College Girls. In October 2020, it was announced that the first episode would be co-written by Kaling and Never Have I Ever's Justin Noble, with Noble joining the series as a co-showrunner and executive producer. On December 7, 2021, HBO Max renewed the series for a second season. On December 14, 2022, HBO Max renewed the series for a third season. On March 18, 2025, Max canceled the series after three seasons.

=== Casting ===
On October 14, 2020, the lead cast, made up of Pauline Chalamet, Amrit Kaur, Reneé Rapp and Alyah Chanelle Scott, was announced. Kalissa Persaud was the runner-up for Kaur's part. Dylan Sprouse joined the main cast in December 2020, but was replaced by Gavin Leatherwood on March 12, 2021, who was cast alongside Midori Francis, Chris Meyer, Ilia Isorelýs Paulino, Lauren "Lolo" Spencer, and Renika Williams in starring roles. On May 19, 2021, Sherri Shepherd, Maya Rose, Rob Huebel, Nicole Sullivan, Conor Donnally, Sierra Katow, Mekki Leeper, and James Morosini joined the cast in recurring capacities. On August 16, 2021, Izzy Roland, Kavi Ladnier, Stephen Guarino, Matt Maloy, Donielle Nash, and Najee Muhammad joined the cast in recurring capacities. On June 3, 2022, Mitchell Slaggert was cast as a new series regular for the second season. On August 15, 2022, Charlie Hall joined the cast in an undisclosed capacity for the second season. On July 10, 2023, it was announced that Rapp is only set to recur for the third season, and depart the series after that to focus on her music career. In April 2024, it was reported that Gracie Lawrence and Mia Rodgers were cast as series regulars for the third season. In May 2024, it was announced that Nabeel Muscatwalla, Rebecca Wisocky, and Michael Hsu Rosen were cast in recurring roles for the third season. On June 18, 2024, it was reported that Devin Craig, Ruby Cruz, Michael Provost, and Roby Attal joined the cast in recurring capacities for the third season.

=== Filming ===
The series began filming on November 20, 2020, in Los Angeles. Filming also took place at Vassar College in mid-2021. On June 19, 2021, recurring cast member Sherri Shepherd posted a behind-the-scenes video of her character in costume and revealed that the series was scheduled to premiere in late 2021. Filming for the second season began in late April 2022, some of which took place on the University of Washington's Seattle campus. Filming for the third season began on March 4, 2024, and wrapped up on June 10, 2024.

== Release ==
The Sex Lives of College Girls premiered on November 18, 2021, with the first two episodes available immediately, followed by three new episodes on November 25 and December 2, and the final two episodes of the first season on December 9 on HBO Max. The second season was released on November 17, 2022, with two episodes available immediately and two more episodes available weekly on Thursdays until the season finale on December 15. In November 2023, HBO CEO and Chairman Casey Bloys announced that the third season of The Sex Lives of College Girls is set to debut in spring 2024. The third season premiered on November 21, 2024, with a new episode on a weekly basis until the season finale on January 23, 2025.

On July 5, 2022, the series became available on the RTÉ Player in the Republic of Ireland with some episodes also airing on RTÉ2. The two seasons are available in the United Kingdom via ITVX. In Belgium, the show can be watched via Streamz.

== Reception ==
=== Critical response ===
For the first season, the review aggregator website Rotten Tomatoes reported a 97% approval rating with an average rating of 7.6/10, based on 30 critic reviews. The website's critics consensus reads, "While The Sex Lives of College Girls doesn't rewrite the syllabus for Anthropology 101, it succeeds gracefully as a warm-hearted romp on campus." Metacritic, which uses a weighted average, assigned a score of 72 out of 100 based on 17 critics, indicating "generally favorable reviews".

Saloni Gajjar of The A.V. Club gave the first season a B+ and wrote, "The way the show tackles how teens cope with sudden freedom is both funny and truthful." Angie Han of The Hollywood Reporter, said that it is "nothing novel or fancy [but] warm and gooey enough to satisfy."

On Rotten Tomatoes, the second season holds an approval rating of 93% with an average rating of 6.6/10, based on 15 critic reviews. The website's critics consensus states, "Bawdy and sweet as ever, The Sex Lives of College Girls continues to excel as a refreshing twist on youthful indiscretions." On Metacritic, it has received a score of 83 out of 100, based on 7 critics, indicating "universal acclaim".

On Rotten Tomatoes, the third season has an approval rating of 33%, with an average rating of 5.9/10, based on 6 critic reviews. Taylor Gates of Collider gave the season a score of 8 out of 10, praising the writing, soundtrack, costumes, new characters, and performances of Kaur, Paulino, and Scott.

=== Accolades ===
The Sex Lives of College Girls was nominated for the Outstanding New TV Series category for the 33rd GLAAD Media Awards in 2022. For its casting department (Elizabeth Barnes and Jennifer Euston), the series was nominated for an Artios Award for Outstanding Achievement in Comedy Pilot Casting. The series was awarded the "Seal of Female Empowerment in Entertainment" (SOFEE) by the Women's Committee of the Critics Choice Association, for its outstanding work in "[illuminating] the female experience and perspective through authentically told female-driven stories."
