= Lauren "Lolo" Spencer =

American actress

Lauren Spencer
- Born: July 9, 1987 (age 39); San Joaquin, California
- Occupation: Actress
- Years active: 2019–present
- Website: lolospencer.com

Lauren "Lolo" Spencer is an American actress, author, and influencer. She is best known for playing Jocelyn in the teen comedy drama series The Sex Lives of College Girls and Daphne in the comedy drama film Bob Trevino Likes It.

== Early life ==
Spencer was born in 1987 in San Joaquin, California and grew up in Stockton, California. She is a graduate of California State University, Northridge and has a degree in TV production with an emphasis in video editing.

== Career ==
=== Acting ===
Spencer made her on-screen debut depicting Tracy in the comedy drama film Give Me Liberty. She was nominated for Best Supporting Female at the 35th Independent Spirit Awards for her role in the film. Her first appearance in a television show came playing Ella in the crime show NCIS: Los Angeles. Her biggest role so far has been as Jocelyn in the teen comedy drama series The Sex Lives of College Girls. She appeared in 15 episodes. She had a recurring role in the animated series Firebuds voicing Jazzy, appearing in 10 episodes. Spencer appeared in Bob Trevino Likes It in 2024 as Daphne. The film won the Narrative Feature Jury Award and the Audience Award at the 2024 South by Southwest film festival.

=== Writing ===
In March 2023, Spencer authored a self-help book for people with disabilities titled Access Your Drive and Enjoy the Ride: A Guide to Achieving Your Dreams from a Person with a Disability, published by Mango Publishers.

== Personal life ==
At the age of 14 Spencer was diagnosed with ALS, a condition which has weakened her muscles. In high school, she walked with the support of leg braces. By age 19, she was using a motorized wheelchair. Spencer is also an advocate for accessibility and media representation of people with disabilities.

== Filmography ==
=== Film ===
Year	Title	Role	Notes
2019	Give Me Liberty	Tracy	
2024	Bob Trevino Likes It	Daphne	

=== Television ===
Year	Title	Role	Notes
2023	NCIS: Los Angeles	Ella	Episode; Flesh & Blood
2023	With Love	Dina	Episode; Engagement Party
2021–2024	The Sex Lives of College Girls	Jocelyn	15 episodes
2022–2025	Firebuds	Jazzy	Voice; 10 episodes

=== Video Games ===
Year	Title	Role	Notes
2023	Stray Gods: The Roleplaying Musical	Venus	
