= Hexed (2026 film) =

2026 film by Fawn Veerasunthorn and Jason Hand

- Theatrical release poster
- Directed by: Fawn Veerasunthorn; Jason Hand
- Screenplay by: Jared Bush; Dana Ledoux Miller
- Story by: Josie Trinidad
- Produced by: Roy Conli; Yvett Merino
- Starring: Hailee Steinfeld; Rashida Jones; Jodie Foster; Walton Goggins; Henry Winkler; Dan Stevens; Brett Gelman; Tracey Ullman; Stephen Fry
- Music by: Kris Bowers
- Production company: Walt Disney Animation Studios
- Distributed by: Walt Disney Studios; Motion Pictures (Note: Distributed under the Walt Disney Pictures banner.)
- Release dates: November 12, 2026 (El Capitan Theatre); November 25, 2026 (United States)
- Running time: 103 minutes
- Country: United States
- Language: English

Disney's Hexed, known simply as Hexed, is a 2026 American animated supernatural fantasy film produced by Walt Disney Animation Studios. It was directed by Fawn Veerasunthorn and Jason Hand and written by Jared Bush and Dana Ledoux Miller from a story by Josie Trinidad, and stars Hailee Steinfeld, Rashida Jones, Jodie Foster, Walton Goggins, Henry Winkler, Dan Stevens, Brett Gelman, Tracey Ullman, and Stephen Fry. The film follows a teen girl named Billie Doe (Steinfeld), who discovers magical powers that take her from suburbia into Hexe, the world of witches.

The film was first announced at Destination D23 in August 2025, where Walt Disney Animation Studios chief creative officer Jared Bush revealed the film's title, logo, and initial story details; its plot was later described, with the film being announced at that stage with Trinidad and Hand as initial directors. In April 2026, at that year's CinemaCon, Disney revealed an updated premise and a first look at the film, with creative credits being updated and casting beginning that month.

Hexed premiered at the El Capitan Theatre on November 12, 2026, and is scheduled to be released in the United States on November 25 by Walt Disney Studios Motion Pictures.

== Premise ==
After being expelled from school, an impulsive and unconventional teen girl named Billie discovers magical abilities that take her from suburbia into Hexe, a realm of witches. With her cautious mother Alice catching up to her, she investigates family secrets connected to the world of witches.

== Voice cast ==
- Hailee Steinfeld as Billie Doe, a teen girl who discovers she possesses magical abilities
- Rashida Jones as Alice Doe, Billie's cautious mother
- Jodie Foster as Queen Celeste, the villainous queen of the witches
- Walton Goggins as Beef Roger Crummchuk, a three-eyed green cat
- Henry Winkler as Nigel, a skittish, all-knowing potoo bird
- Dan Stevens as Hieronymous, Queen Celeste's blustering and self-important Grand Councillor of the Throne
- Brett Gelman as Principal Huggins, Billie's principal who expels her from school after an incident in the bathroom
- Tracey Ullman as Ms. Quill, a talking quill
- Stephen Fry as Elias Quire, a talking book
- Samson Kayo as Constable Beanes, an officer in Hexe
- Jimmy O. Yang as Wizard Steve
- Ron Funches as Wizard Francis
- Drew McIntyre as Moon Hype McInmoon, a man in a moon costume
- Cheri Oteri as Hedda, a floating head
- Kathy Najimy as Raccoon Rhonda, a raccoon
- Wayne Knight as Mike the Microwave, a microwave owned by Beef that becomes sentient due to Billie's magic
- Alan Tudyk as the Enchanted Sign
- Randall Park as Mr. Twinkleton, a wizard who teaches magic
- Bill Farmer
- Pat McAfee as Rat McAfee
- Chris Parnell as Gill, Alice's coworker
- Sarah-Nicole Robles
- Rachel Dratch
- Ariana Madix as Passing Phone Witch
- Kellie Gerardi as Owllie Hootstergar
- Yvette Nicole Brown as Scared Tea Cup
- Abraham Benrubi
- Josh Dallas
- Jodi Benson as Cursula, a witch based on Ursula from The Little Mermaid (1989). Benson voiced Ariel in said film and also had an uncredited voice role as Ursula's human alter-ego Vanessa.

== Production ==
=== Development ===
Hexed was first announced at Destination D23 in August 2025, where Walt Disney Animation Studios chief creative officer Jared Bush revealed the film's title, logo, and initial story details. The film was then described as following an awkward teenage girl and her Type A mother after they discover that the girl's unusual traits may be magical powers. At that stage, the feature was announced with Josie Trinidad and Jason Hand as directors, and Roy Conli and Juan Pablo Reyes Lancaster-Jones as producers.

By Disney's CinemaCon presentation in April 2026, the premise had been updated to center on Billie, an impulsive teenage girl, and her mother Alice. Disney identified Fawn Veerasunthorn and Hand as directors, Trinidad as co-director, and Conli as producer. The updated creative credits were also reported by Cartoon Brew, which described the film as a coming-of-age fantasy film centered on a mother-daughter dynamic.

=== Casting ===
In April 2026, Hailee Steinfeld and Rashida Jones were announced as the lead voice cast, with Steinfeld voicing Billie and Jones voicing Alice. The casting announcement accompanied the film's first-look presentation at CinemaCon. In June 2026, with the release of the trailer, Tracey Ullman and Stephen Fry were announced as part of the cast. In August 2026, Jodie Foster and Walton Goggins were announced as part of the cast.

=== Music ===
In October 2026, Kris Bowers was revealed to be composing the film's musical score. The film's star, Hailee Steinfeld, recorded a cover of "Magic" by The Cars, released via Walt Disney Records on October 23, 2026. The film's soundtrack, which includes Steinfeld's cover of "Magic", was released on November 20, 2026.

All music is composed by Kris Bowers.

Hexed (Original Motion Picture Soundtrack)
No.	Title	Writer(s)	Performer	Length
1.	"Magic"	Ric Ocasek	Hailee Steinfeld	3:47
2.	"A Foretelling Foretold"			1:30
3.	"Out and About"			1:53
4.	"Sorry, Bean"			0:53
5.	"Rules Rules Rules"			0:58
6.	"Outsider"			1:20
7.	"Billie the Kid"			2:28
8.	"Out of Sink"			1:30
9.	"What Happens If?"			1:45
10.	"Holy Smoly"			2:22
11.	"Enchanted Objects"			1:12
12.	"Ode to an Old Tome"			2:22
13.	"Not Really From Ohio"			3:55
14.	"Grand Entrance"			0:59
15.	"Two for Tea"			2:10
16.	"Billie Eyelash"			1:28
17.	"Beef Roger Crummchuk"			2:29
18.	"No Pet Names"			1:07
19.	"Know You're Limit"			2:09
20.	"Into the Wild"			1:47
21.	"Gibberish and Jazz Hands"			0:48
22.	"Easy Peasy"			2:05
23.	"You're Her"			0:55
24.	"Familiar Town"			2:09
25.	"Feels Familiar"			1:46
26.	"Mission Impossumble"			0:53
27.	"Close Encounter"			1:07
28.	"Don't Look Down"			1:30
29.	"Miasma"			1:32
30.	"Remove It from the Root"			1:03
31.	"Katharsis"			3:38
32.	"Fun Mom Alert"			1:47
33.	"Prophecy Plans"			1:25
34.	"Birds of a Feather"			2:29
35.	"Plan Billie"			1:58
36.	"Gouda Luck"			1:50
37.	"Billie's Choice"			1:01
38.	"Who Deserves the Moon?"			1:48
39.	"Maxing Gibbous"			2:39
40.	"Liminal Space"			2:03
41.	"Glow Up Up and Away"			1:03
42.	"I, Billie"			0:39
43.	"Moon Spell"			2:37
44.	"Hexed Main Theme"			3:27
Total length:				1:20:00

== Marketing ==
Disney showed a new logo and first-look footage from Hexed during its CinemaCon presentation in Las Vegas in April 2026. The presentation introduced the film as Walt Disney Animation Studios' fall 2026 original release and gave exhibitors a first look at the mother-daughter fantasy story.

In April 2026, Walt Disney Animation Studios was announced as part of the studio-focused programming at the 2026 Annecy International Animation Film Festival, where previously unseen footage from Hexed was scheduled to be shown. Additional panel sections for the film were held at D23: The Ultimate Disney Fan Event on August 14, 2026, and at Comic-Con Málaga on October 3, 2026.

== Release ==
Hexed had its world premiere at the El Capitan Theatre on November 12, 2026. It is scheduled to be released theatrically in the United States on November 25, 2026. The film is accompanied by the Lilo & Stitch short film Lilo & Scratch, also co-directed by Veerasunthorn.

== See also ==
- List of films about witchcraft
- List of Walt Disney Animation Studios films
