= Mitchell Slaggert =

American actor and model

- Occupations: Actor, model
- Years active: 2017–present

Mitchell Slaggert is an American actor and model, based in New York.

He is the son of Jeff and Kellye Slaggert. He appeared in the Broad Green feature film Wish Upon, opposite Joey King and Ryan Phillippe, and directed by John Leonetti. He also appeared in the limited series Diablo Guardián for Blim. After being scouted on the street in Wilmington N.C., he was cast as the lead of the independent film Moss by Daniel Peddle which premiered in the US Fiction Competition at the 2017 LA Film Festival on June 21, 2017.

As a model, Slaggert has been the face of Calvin Klein Underwear, Dsquared2, David Yurman, Jean Paul Gaultier, Versace and featured in numerous publications around the world.

Slaggert plays Jackson on season 2 of The Sex Lives of College Girls.

Slaggert plays Ryder in the first season of Landman on Paramount+

== Filmography ==
=== Film ===
- Moss (2017), as Moss
- Wish Upon (2017), as Paul Middlebrook
- Write When You Get Work (2018), as Stef

=== Television ===
Year	Title	Role	Notes
2018	Diablo Guardián	Eric / Superman	4 episodes
2021	Gossip Girl	Rob	Episode: "Gossip Gone, Girl"
2022	The Sex Lives of College Girls	Jackson	9 episodes
2024	A Carpenter Christmas Romance	Seth Ferguson	TV movie
2024–present	Landman	Ryder Sampson	3 episodes
