= Comic-Con Málaga =

Pop culture fan convention in Málaga

- Comic-Con Málaga logo
- Status: Active
- Genre: Multigenre
- Venue: Palacio de Ferias y Congresos (FYCMA)
- Location: Málaga
- Coordinates: 36°42′17″N 4°27′34″W
- Country: Spain
- Inaugurated: September 25, 2025
- Attendance: 60.000
- Organizer: COSMIC LEGENDS PRODUCTIONS, S.L.; Dentsu; Junta de Andalucía; Ayuntamiento de Málaga
- Filing status: Private limited company
- Website: sandiegocomicconmalaga.com

Comic-Con Málaga, formally known as Comic-Con San Diego Málaga, is a pop culture fan convention in Málaga that was held in the Palacio de Ferias y Congresos (FYCMA) from 25 to 28 September 2025. It is the first international edition of San Diego Comic-Con outside United States, and it will have three annually editions until 2027.

== Presentation ceremony ==
It was announced on 10 March 2025 at the Gran Hotel Miramar, attended by film, television and comics guests such as Álex de la Iglesia, Carolina Bang, Paco Plaza, Daniel Sánchez Arévalo, Natalia Verbeke, Paloma Bloyd, Eva Ugarte, Tamar Novas, Icíar Bollain, Carlos Areces and Joaquín Mazón. The event concluded with the 501st Legion performance, a Star Wars organization, and it was also exhibited the Infinity Gauntlet, inspired by Thanos artifact in Avengers: Infinity War.

== 2025 edition ==
The guest of honor was actor Arnold Schwarzenegger.The edition, which had public funding of 4.5 million euros, had a large turnout, causing hours of queues and supply problems. The president of the Andalusian Government, Juan Manuel Moreno, stated that the event has, despite everything, had a positive impact and that the event organizers have already begun to work on improvement measures for the 2026 edition.

== 2026 edition ==
The second edition was held between 1 and 4 October 2026.

== Controversies ==
In the first edition, Organización de Consumidores y Usuarios received more than 200 complaints, and Facua received more than 300 reports due to more tickets were sold than the venue could legally accommodate, resulting in overcrowding, pushing, situations posing physical risk, difficulty accessing activities (hours-long queues at around 40 °C), lack of signage and staff assisting and informing attendees, raised prices, etc.

== Special guests ==
=== Directors ===
- John Lee Hancock
- Alex de la Iglesia
- Paco Plaza
- Daniel Sánchez Arévalo
- Josef Fares
- J.A. Bayona
- Joachim Rønning
- Dan Trachtenberg

=== Actors ===
- Antonio Banderas
- Jared Leto
- Jodie Turner-Smith
- Aaron Paul
- Natalia Dyer
- Dafne Keen
- Luke Evans
- Gwendoline Christie
- Arnold Schwarzenegger
- Norman Reedus
- Melissa McBride
- David Zabel
- Dan Percival
- Alexandra Masangkay
- Eduardo Noriega
- Óscar Jaenada
- Hugo Arbués
- Candela Saitta
- Nicholas Denton
- Mark Lafferty
- Pedro Alonso
- Natalia Verbeke
- Carolina Bang
- Carlos Areces
- Paloma Bloyd
- Eva Ugarte
- Tamar Novas
- Icíar Bollain
- Joaquín Mazón
- Ashley Eckstein
- Brian Austin Green
- Taz Skylar
- Elle Fanning
