= List of accolades received by Zootopia =

Zootopia accolades
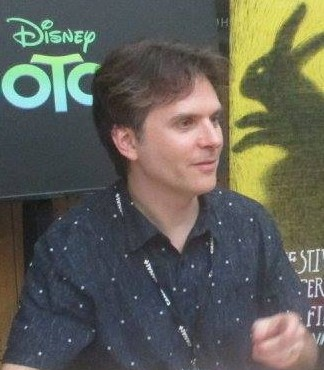
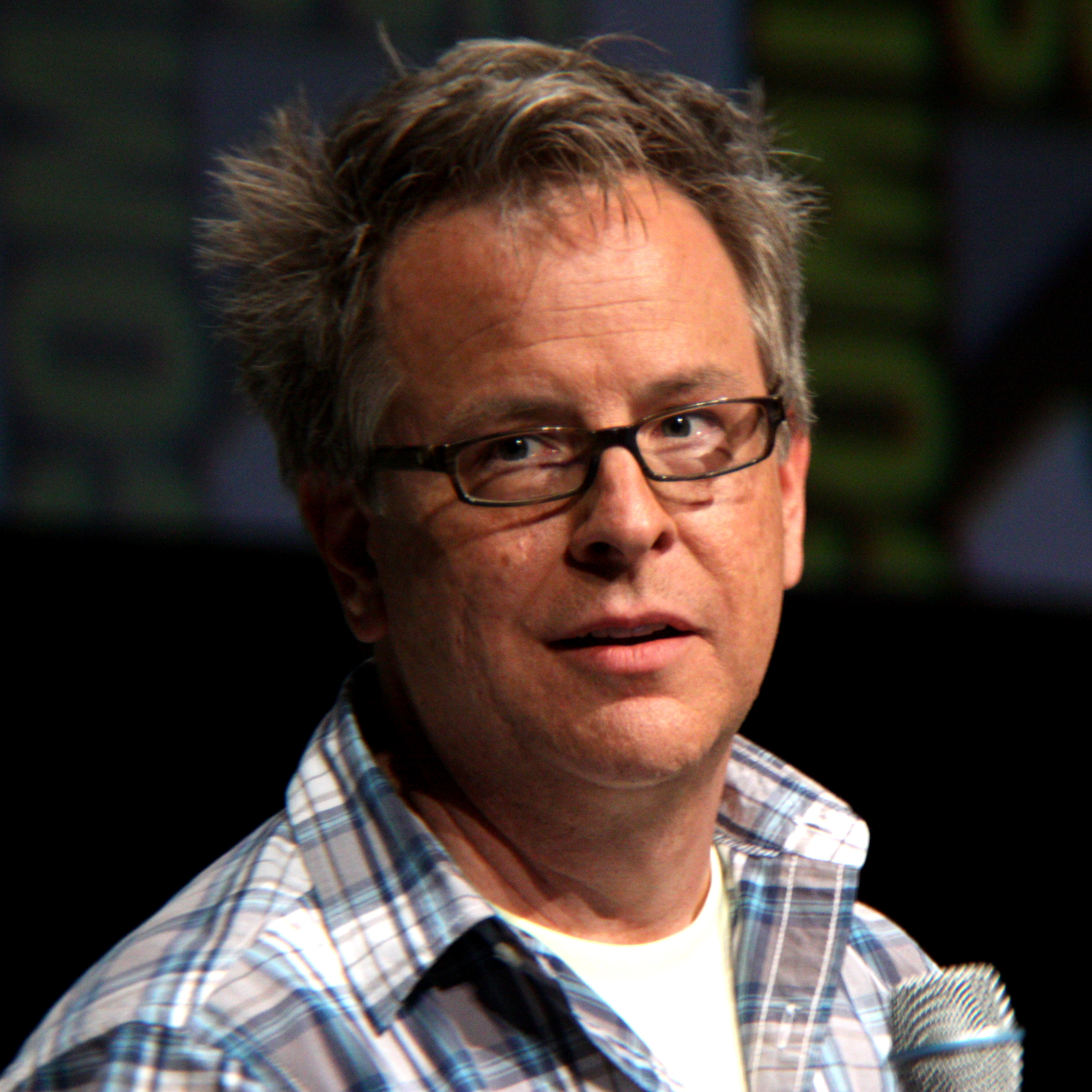
- Byron Howard (left) and Rich Moore (right) received several accolades for co-directing the film.
Accolades
Award	Wins	Nominations
AARP Movies for Grownups Awards	0	1
Academy Awards	1	1
African-American Film Critics Association Awards	1	1
Alliance of Women Film Journalists EDA Awards	2	2
American Cinema Editors Eddie Awards	1	1
American Film Institute Awards	1	1
Annie Awards	6	11
Artios Awards	0	1
Austin Film Critics Association Awards	0	1
Black Reel Awards	0	1
British Academy Children's Awards	1	1
British Academy Film Awards	0	1
Chicago Film Critics Association Awards	0	1
Cinema Audio Society Awards	0	1
Critics' Choice Movie Awards	1	1
Dallas–Fort Worth Film Critics Association Awards	1	1
Florida Film Critics Circle Awards	0	1
Georgia Film Critics Association Awards	1	1
Golden Globe Awards	1	1
Golden Reel Awards	0	1
Golden Trailer Awards	1	4
Grammy Awards	0	1
Hollywood Film Awards	1	1
Hollywood Music in Media Awards	0	2
Hollywood Professional Association Awards	0	1
Houston Film Critics Society Awards	0	1
International Film Music Critics Association Awards	0	1
Japan Academy Film Prize	0	1
Kids' Choice Awards	1	2
Nebula Awards	0	1
New York Film Critics Circle Awards	1	1
Online Film Critics Society Awards	0	1
People's Choice Awards	0	4
Producers Guild of America Awards	1	1
San Diego Film Critics Society Awards	0	1
San Francisco Film Critics Circle Awards	0	1
Satellite Awards	0	1
Saturn Awards	0	1
St. Louis Film Critics Association Awards	1	1
Teen Choice Awards	0	1
Toronto Film Critics Association Awards	1	1
Village Voice Film Poll	0	1
Visual Effects Society Awards	0	2
Washington D.C. Area Film Critics Association Awards	0	3

Totals (Note: Certain award groups do not simply award one winner. They acknowledge several different recipients, have runners-up, and have third place. Since this is a specific recognition and is different from losing an award, runner-up mentions are considered wins in this award tally. For simplification and to avoid errors, each award in this list has been presumed to have had a prior nomination.)
- Wins: 24
- Nominations: 65

Zootopia (Note: Titled Zootropolis in regions such as the United Kingdom, Italy, and Spain, and Zoomania in Germany.) is a 2016 American animated buddy cop comedy film produced by Walt Disney Animation Studios and released by Walt Disney Pictures. The film was directed by Byron Howard and Rich Moore and was based on a screenplay written by Jared Bush (who also co-directed) and Phil Johnston. Zootopia focuses on the unlikely partnership between an ambitious rabbit police officer, Judy Hopps (voiced by Ginnifer Goodwin) and a crafty red fox con artist, Nick Wilde (voiced by Jason Bateman) as they uncover a conspiracy behind the mysterious disappearance of predators from a mammalian metropolis.

Zootopia premiered on February 11, 2016, in Denmark before going into wide release in more than 3,800 theaters in the United States and Canada on March 4. Made on a production budget of $150 million, Zootopia grossed a worldwide total of over $1 billion at the box office. On the review aggregator website Rotten Tomatoes, the film holds an approval rating of 98% based on 298 reviews.

Zootopia has received various awards and nominations. At the 89th Academy Awards, the film won Best Animated Feature. It also won the Golden Globe Award for Best Animated Feature Film and was nominated for the BAFTA Award for Best Animated Film, losing to Kubo and the Two Strings. At the 44th Annie Awards, Zootopia received eleven nominations and won six including Best Animated Feature and Outstanding Achievement, Voice Acting in an Animated Feature Production for Bateman. The film won Best Animated Motion Picture at the 28th Producers Guild of America Awards. Goodwin received the Best Animated Female award from the Alliance of Women Film Journalists and received nominations from the People's Choice Awards, and the Washington D.C. Area Film Critics Association. Musician Sia and music producers Stargate garnered a nomination for the Grammy Award for Best Song Written for Visual Media for "Try Everything", performed by Shakira. The American Film Institute included Zootopia in their list of the top ten of 2016.

== Accolades ==
Accolades received by Zootopia
Award	Date of ceremony	Category	Recipient(s)	Result	Ref.
AARP Movies for Grownups Awards	February 6, 2017	Best Movie for Grownups who Refuse to Grow Up	Zootopia	Nominated	
Academy Awards	February 26, 2017	Best Animated Feature	Byron Howard, Rich Moore, and Clark Spencer	Won	
African-American Film Critics Association	February 8, 2017	Best Animation Film	Zootopia	Won	
Alliance of Women Film Journalists	December 21, 2016	Best Animated Film	Jared Bush, Byron Howard and Rich Moore	Won	
Alliance of Women Film Journalists	December 21, 2016	Best Animated Female	Ginnifer Goodwin	Won (Note: Tied with Auliʻi Cravalho for Moana)	
American Cinema Editors	January 27, 2017	Best Edited Animated Feature Film	Fabienne Rawley and Jeremy Milton	Won	
American Film Institute	January 6, 2017	Top 10 Films of the Year	Zootopia	Won (Note: This award does not have a single winner, but recognizes multiple films.)	
Annie Awards	February 4, 2017	Best Animated Feature	Zootopia	Won	
Annie Awards	February 4, 2017	Outstanding Achievement for Animated Effects in an Animated Production	Dong Joo Byun, Henrik Fält, Sam Klock, Rattanin Sirinaruemarn and Thom Wickes	Nominated	
Annie Awards	February 4, 2017	Outstanding Achievement for Character Animation in a Feature Production	Dave Hardin	Nominated	
Annie Awards	February 4, 2017	Outstanding Achievement for Character Animation in a Feature Production	Chad Sellers	Nominated	
Annie Awards	February 4, 2017	Outstanding Achievement for Character Design in a Feature Production	Cory Loftis	Won	
Annie Awards	February 4, 2017	Outstanding Achievement for Directing in a Feature Production	Byron Howard and Rich Moore	Won	
Annie Awards	February 4, 2017	Outstanding Achievement for Editorial in a Feature Production	Jeremy Milton and Fabienne Rawley	Nominated	
Annie Awards	February 4, 2017	Outstanding Achievement for Production Design in an Animated Feature Production	David Goetz and Matthias Lechner	Nominated	
Annie Awards	February 4, 2017	Outstanding Achievement for Storyboarding in a Feature Production	Dean Wellins	Won	
Annie Awards	February 4, 2017	Outstanding Achievement for Writing in a Feature Production	Jared Bush and Phil Johnston	Won	
Annie Awards	February 4, 2017	Outstanding Achievement for Voice Acting in a Feature Production	Jason Bateman	Won	
Austin Film Critics Association	December 28, 2016	Best Animated Film	Zootopia	Nominated	
Black Reel Awards	February 16, 2017	Outstanding Voice Performance	Idris Elba	Nominated	
British Academy Children's Awards	November 20, 2016	Feature Film	Zootopia	Won	
British Academy Film Awards	February 12, 2017	Best Animated Film	Byron Howard and Rich Moore	Nominated	
Casting Society of America	January 19, 2017	Animation	Jamie Sparer Roberts	Nominated	
Chicago Film Critics Association	December 15, 2016	Best Animated Film	Zootopia	Nominated	
Cinema Audio Society Awards	February 18, 2017	Outstanding Achievement in Sound Mixing for a Motion Picture – Animated	Scott Curtis, David E. Fluhr, Gabriel Guy, Joel Iwataki and Paul McGrath	Nominated	
Critics' Choice Movie Awards	December 11, 2016	Best Animated Feature	Zootopia	Won	
Dallas–Fort Worth Film Critics Association	December 13, 2016	Best Animated Film	Zootopia	Won	
Florida Film Critics Circle	December 23, 2016	Best Animated Film	Zootopia	Runner-up	
Georgia Film Critics Association Awards	January 13, 2017	Best Animated Film	Zootopia	Won	
Golden Globe Awards	January 8, 2017	Best Animated Feature Film	Zootopia	Won	
Golden Trailer Awards	May 4, 2016	Best Original Score TV Spot	"Try Everything Voice 3 Days – IMAX"	Nominated	
Golden Trailer Awards	May 4, 2016	Most Original TV Spot	"Oscar Review"	Won	
Golden Trailer Awards	May 4, 2016	Best Pre-Show Theatrical Advertising for a Brand	"Popcorn Club"	Nominated	
Golden Trailer Awards	June 6, 2017	Best Radio / Audio Spot	"Zootopia Awards"	Nominated	
Grammy Awards	February 12, 2017	Best Song Written for Visual Media	Sia and Stargate for "Try Everything"	Nominated	
Hollywood Film Awards	November 6, 2016	Hollywood Animation Award	Zootopia	Won	
Hollywood Music in Media Awards	November 17, 2016	Best Original Score – Animated Film	Michael Giacchino	Nominated	
Hollywood Music in Media Awards	November 17, 2016	Best Song – Animated Film	Sia and Stargate for "Try Everything"	Nominated	
Hollywood Post Alliance Awards	November 17, 2016	Outstanding Sound – Feature Film	David Fluhr, Gabriel Guy, and Addison Teague	Nominated	
Houston Film Critics Society	January 6, 2017	Best Animated Feature Film	Zootopia	Nominated	
International Film Music Critics Association	February 23, 2017	Best Original Score For An Animated Film	Michael Giacchino	Nominated	
Japan Academy Film Prize	March 3, 2017	Outstanding Foreign Language Film	Zootopia	Nominated	
Kids' Choice Awards	March 11, 2017	Favorite Animated Movie	Zootopia	Nominated	
Kids' Choice Awards	March 11, 2017	Favorite Frenemies	Jason Bateman and Ginnifer Goodwin	Won	
Motion Picture Sound Editors	February 19, 2017	Feature English Language: Dialogue/ADR	Jeremy Bowker, Ronni Brown, Stephen M. Davis, Christopher Flick, Earl Ghaffari, Lee Gilmore, Dan Laurie, Willard Overstreet, John Roesch, Addison Teague, Daniel Waldman and Jack Whittaker	Nominated	
New York Film Critics Circle	December 1, 2016	Best Animated Film	Zootopia	Won	
Online Film Critics Society	January 3, 2017	Best Animated Feature	Zootopia	Nominated	
People's Choice Awards	January 18, 2017	Favorite Movie	Zootopia	Nominated	
People's Choice Awards	January 18, 2017	Favorite Family Movie	Zootopia	Nominated	
People's Choice Awards	January 18, 2017	Favorite Animated Movie Voice	Jason Bateman	Nominated	
People's Choice Awards	January 18, 2017	Favorite Animated Movie Voice	Ginnifer Goodwin	Nominated	
Producers Guild of America	January 28, 2017	Best Animated Motion Picture	Clark Spencer	Won	
San Diego Film Critics Society	December 12, 2016	Best Animated Film	Zootopia	Nominated	
San Francisco Film Critics Circle	December 11, 2016	Best Animated Feature	Zootopia	Nominated	
Satellite Awards	February 19, 2017	Best Animated or Mixed Media Feature	Zootopia	Nominated	
Saturn Awards	June 28, 2017	Best Animated Film	Zootopia	Nominated	
Science Fiction and Fantasy Writers of America	May 20, 2017	Ray Bradbury Award	Jared Bush, Phil Johnston, and Byron Howard	Nominated	
St. Louis Film Critics Association	December 18, 2016	Best Animated Film	Zootopia	Won	
Teen Choice Awards	July 31, 2016	Choice Music: Song from a Movie or TV Show	Shakira for "Try Everything"	Nominated	
Toronto Film Critics Association	December 11, 2016	Best Animated Film	Zootopia	Won	
Village Voice Film Poll	January 6, 2017	Best Animated Feature	Zootopia	3rd Place	
Visual Effects Society	February 7, 2017	Outstanding Visual Effects in an Animated Feature	David Goetz, Scott Kersavage, Ernest J. Petti and Bradford S. Simonsen	Nominated	
Visual Effects Society	February 7, 2017	Outstanding Effects Simulations in an Animated Feature	Nicholas Burkard, Moe El-Ali, Claudia Chung Sanii and Thom Wickes	Nominated	
Washington D.C. Area Film Critics Association	December 5, 2016	Best Animated Feature	Zootopia	Nominated	
Washington D.C. Area Film Critics Association	December 5, 2016	Best Voice Performance	Jason Bateman	Nominated	
Washington D.C. Area Film Critics Association	December 5, 2016	Best Voice Performance	Ginnifer Goodwin	Nominated	
