= Zootopia =

2016 film by Byron Howard and Rich Moore

- Theatrical release poster
- Directed by: Byron Howard; Rich Moore
- Screenplay by: Jared Bush; Phil Johnston
- Story by: Byron Howard; Rich Moore; Jared Bush; Jim Reardon; Josie Trinidad; Phil Johnston; Jennifer Lee
- Produced by: Clark Spencer
- Starring: Ginnifer Goodwin; Jason Bateman; Idris Elba; Jenny Slate; Nate Torrence; Bonnie Hunt; Don Lake; Tommy Chong; J. K. Simmons; Octavia Spencer; Alan Tudyk; Shakira
- Cinematography: Nathan Warner (layout); Brian Leach (lighting)
- Edited by: Fabienne Rawley; Jeremy Milton
- Music by: Michael Giacchino
- Production company: Walt Disney Animation Studios
- Distributed by: Walt Disney Studios; Motion Pictures (Note: Distributed under the Walt Disney Pictures banner.)
- Release dates: February 13, 2016 (Brussels); March 4, 2016 (United States)
- Running time: 108 minutes
- Country: United States
- Language: English
- Budget: $150 million
- Box office: $1.026 billion

Zootopia (titled Zootropolis in some markets) is a 2016 American animated buddy cop comedy film directed by Byron Howard and Rich Moore and written by Jared Bush and Phil Johnston. Produced by Walt Disney Animation Studios, it is the first film in the Zootopia franchise and features the voices of Ginnifer Goodwin, Jason Bateman, Idris Elba, Jenny Slate, Nate Torrence, Bonnie Hunt, Don Lake, Tommy Chong, J. K. Simmons, Octavia Spencer, Alan Tudyk, and Shakira. The film follows the rabbit Judy Hopps (Goodwin), a rookie cop, and the fox Nick Wilde (Bateman), a con artist, as they work together to uncover a conspiracy involving the disappearance of predators.

Zootopia premiered at the Brussels International Animation Film Festival on February 13, 2016, and was released in the United States on March 4. The film received positive reviews from critics, who praised its screenplay, animation, and subject matter. Zootopia opened to record-breaking box office returns in several countries, and grossed over $1 billion, making it the fourth-highest-grossing film of 2016. Among other accolades, Zootopia was named one of the top-ten films of 2016 by the American Film Institute and won Best Animated Feature at the 89th Academy Awards. An anthology series of short films, Zootopia+, premiered in 2022, and a sequel, Zootopia 2, followed in 2025. A third film is in development.

== Plot ==
In a world inhabited by anthropomorphic animals, Judy Hopps, a rabbit from rural Bunnyburrow, fulfills her childhood dream of becoming the first rabbit police officer in the city of Zootopia. On her first day at the Zootopia Police Department (ZPD), Judy is assigned to parking duty by Chief Bogo, who underestimates her potential. During her shift, she is hustled by red fox con artist Nick Wilde, who tells her she will never be a real cop. The next day, Judy abandons her post to arrest small-time crook Duke Weaselton for robbing a florist right in front of her. Afterwards, Mrs. Otterton visits Bogo, pleading for someone to find her husband Emmitt - he is one of several predators who have gone missing. Judy volunteers to take the case without waiting for permission, and an annoyed Bogo warns her she must solve it within 48 hours, or turn in her badge.

Having ascertained that Nick was one of the last to see Emmitt, Judy blackmails him into helping her. They follow clues to a naturist club, then to the sloth-run DMV. There, they get an address for the limousine that took Emmitt from the club, and trace it to arctic shrew mafia boss Mr. Big, who has a grudge against Nick. Mr. Big prepares to drown Judy and Nick, until his daughter Fru Fru reveals Judy saved her life while stopping Weaselton. Mr. Big then welcomes them in, and explains that Emmitt unexpectedly "went savage" in the limousine and attacked the chauffeur Renato Manchas, a black jaguar.

Judy and Nick question Manchas, who explains that Emmitt yelled about "Night Howlers" before attacking him. Before he can explain more, Manchas suddenly turns savage himself, and pursues them. Judy alerts the ZPD, but Manchas vanishes before backup arrives. Bogo demands Judy's resignation, but Nick reminds him there are still a few hours left. Nick later reveals to Judy that he was bullied as a child, and has resigned himself to always being seen as a "shifty fox".

At City Hall, Assistant Mayor Dawn Bellwether allows them access to Zootopia's traffic cameras, which reveal Manchas was abducted by timberwolves, whom Judy assumes are the Night Howlers. Following the wolves to an asylum, Judy and Nick locate Emmitt and the other missing predators, who are all "savage". Mayor Leodore Lionheart had imprisoned them to prevent citywide hysteria, and to protect the public, and his career. After Judy and Nick alert the ZPD, Lionheart and the asylum staff are arrested, Bellwether becomes the new mayor, and the missing animals are hospitalized. Judy, praised for solving the case, invites Nick to join the ZPD as her partner. At a press conference, Judy inadvertently suggests that the predators' physiology caused their feral behavior. Deeply hurt, Nick leaves, and Judy's comments incite fear and discrimination against predators throughout Zootopia. Wracked with guilt over causing the panic Lionheart tried to prevent, Judy resigns from the ZPD and returns to Bunnyburrow.

While managing her parents' vegetable stand, Judy learns that Night Howlers are actually flowers, which have severe, lasting psychotropic effects if ingested. Realizing that someone is using the flowers to turn predators savage, Judy returns to Zootopia and reconciles with Nick. They interrogate Weaselton, who confesses that a ram named Doug hired him to steal Night Howler bulbs. They find Doug in his laboratory, where he manufactures a serum from the Night Howlers to poison predators via a dart gun. Judy and Nick seize the gun as evidence after a pursuit, but before they can reach the ZPD, they are confronted by Bellwether in a Natural History Museum. Revealing that she masterminded the whole prey-supremacist plot to gain power due to the labor abuse that she received from Lionheart, Bellwether traps Judy and Nick in an exhibit and attempts to poison Nick and make him kill Judy. However, Judy and Nick had managed beforehand to replace the serum with blueberries, and record Bellwether's confession.

Bellwether and her accomplices are arrested, while the still-incarcerated Lionheart publicly denies involvement in her scheme. The savage predators are cured, and Judy is reinstated into the ZPD, while Nick becomes Judy's partner and the first fox police officer.

== Voice cast ==
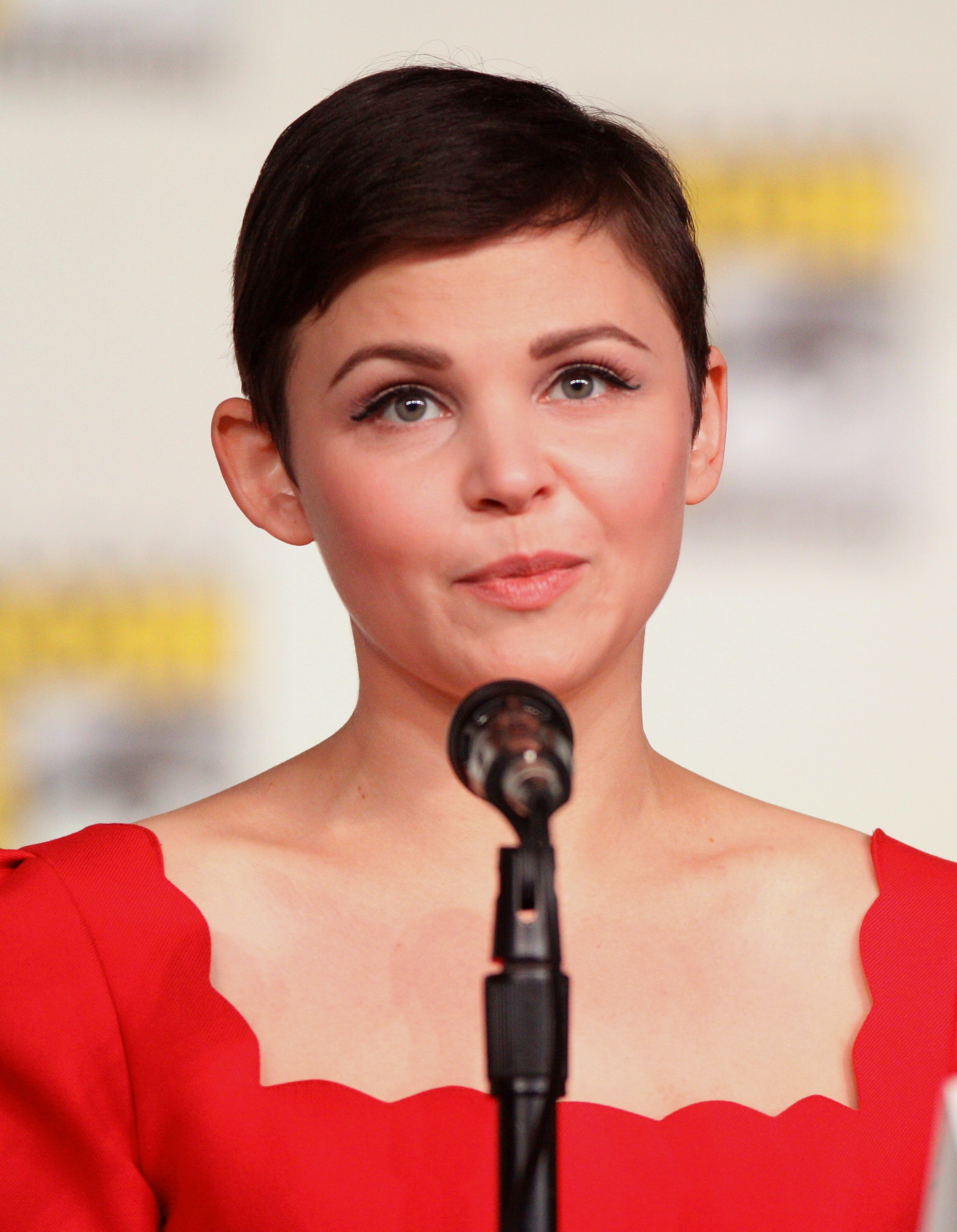
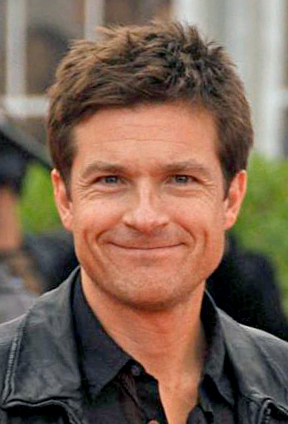
Ginnifer Goodwin and Jason Bateman voice Judy Hopps and Nick Wilde respectively.
- Ginnifer Goodwin as Judy Hopps, a young optimistic rabbit from Bunnyburrow and a newly appointed member of the Zootopia Police Department, assigned to the 1st Precinct.
  - Della Saba additionally portrayed the character's younger self in the film's prologue.
- Jason Bateman as Nick Wilde, a sly red fox and small-time con artist who later joins the Zootopia Police Department as a police officer.
  - Kath Soucie additionally portrayed the character's younger self in a flashback he recounts.
- Idris Elba as Chief Bogo, an African buffalo and the chief of police of the Zootopia Police Department's 1st Precinct.
- Jenny Slate as Dawn Bellwether, a diminutive ewe and the assistant mayor of Zootopia.
- Nate Torrence as Benjamin Clawhauser, an overweight cheetah who works as a dispatcher and desk sergeant for the Zootopia Police Department's 1st Precinct.
- J. K. Simmons as Leodore Lionheart, the noble but pompous lion mayor of Zootopia.
- Shakira as Gazelle, a famous Thomson's gazelle pop star. Shakira also voices Gazelle in the Spain and Latin America Spanish dubs.
- Raymond S. Persi as:
  - Flash Slothmore, the "fastest" three-toed sloth in the DMV (short for Department of Mammal Vehicles).
  - Officer Higgins, an elite hippopotamus member of the Zootopia Police Department's 1st Precinct.
- Maurice LaMarche as Mr. Big, a fearsome Arctic shrew crime boss in Tundratown served by a group of polar bears. The character is an homage to Marlon Brando's role as Vito Corleone in The Godfather.
- Octavia Spencer as Mrs. Otterton, a concerned North American river otter whose husband Emmitt has gone missing.
- Tommy Chong as Yax, a laid-back yak who owns the Mystic Springs Oasis naturist club in Sahara Square.
- Alan Tudyk as Duke Weaselton, a small-time least weasel crook also known for selling bootleg DVDs. The character's name references the Duke of Weselton from Frozen, whom Tudyk previously portrayed.
- Bonnie Hunt as Bonnie Hopps, Judy's mother.
- Don Lake as Stu Hopps, Judy's father and a carrot farmer.
- Phil Johnston as:
  - Gideon Grey, a red fox from Bunnyburrow who bullied the young rabbits and sheep when he was young. As an adult, he has reconciled with those he tormented and is now a much-respected baker.
  - An angry offscreen character who states that his taxes pay Judy's salary after she gives him a parking ticket.
- Fuschia! as Major Friedkin, a polar bear drill instructor at the Zootopia Police Academy.
- John DiMaggio as:
  - Jerry Jumbeaux Jr., an ill-tempered African elephant who owns an ice cream parlor called Jumbeaux's Café, frequented by elephants and other larger mammals.
  - Woolter and Jesse (a pun on the show Breaking Bad's main protagonists, Walter White and Jesse Pinkman), Doug's two tough ram assistants.
  - A moose that gets a parking ticket from Judy.
  - A pig reporter.
- Katie Lowes as Doctor Madge Honey Badger, a honey badger scientist who helps Mayor Lionheart look for the cause of the animals' savagery.
- Gita Reddy as Nangi, an Indian elephant yoga instructor at Mystic Springs Oasis.
- Jesse Corti as Manchas, a black jaguar chauffeur from Zootopia's Rainforest District who works for Zootopia's biggest limo company and serves as Mr. Big's chauffeur.
- Tom Lister Jr. as Finnick, a fennec fox and Nick's partner in crime.
- Josh Dallas as an unnamed pig who frantically asks Judy for help after his "Flora and Fauna" flower shop is robbed by Duke Weaselton. He later appears as a protester at Gazelle's peace rally arguing with a female leopard.
- Leah Latham as Fru Fru, an Arctic shrew and Mr. Big's daughter who befriends Judy after Judy saves her from a runaway Donut sign in Little Rodentia. She later makes Judy the Godmother and namesake of her daughter.
- Rich Moore as:
  - Doug, an emotionless ram chemist and sniper working for Bellwether.
  - Larry, a gray wolf that is a security guard at Cliffside Asylum.
- Fabienne Rawley and Peter Mansbridge as Fabienne Growley and Peter Moosebridge, the snow leopard and moose anchors of the ZNN News.
  - The moose co-anchor is used in the standard version of the film, released in the United States, Italy, France, Canada, Russia, Philippines, and Mexico. In the UK version, the moose is named as Moosos Alexander, voiced by radio journalist Vassos Alexander (though the UK home release used his US name and voice). In other countries, the anchor is a different animal voiced by a different person. David Campbell voices a koala newscaster named David Koalabell in the Australian and New Zealand versions. The Brazilian version uses a jaguar named Onçardo Boi Chá who is voiced by Ricardo Boechat. The Japanese version uses a tanuki named Michael Tanuyama who is voiced by Kazumasa Kōra. The Chinese version uses an unnamed giant panda.
- Byron Howard as:
  - Bucky Antlerson, one of Judy's greater kudu next-door neighbors.
  - Travis, Gideon Grey's black-footed ferret friend.
- Jared Bush as Pronk Oryx, one of Judy's gemsbok next-door neighbors.
- Mark Rhino Smith as Officer McHorn, a black rhinoceros police officer in the Zootopia Police Department's 1st Precinct.
- Josie Trinidad as Dharma Armadillo, a nine-banded armadillo and the landlady of the Grand Pangolin Apartments that Judy moves into.
- John Lavelle as the unnamed construction mouse foreman of Little Rodentia's construction crew who receives the Pawpsicle sticks from Nick and Finnick.
- Kristen Bell as Priscilla Tripletoe, a three-toed sloth and Flash's co-worker at the DMV.

== Production ==
=== Writing ===
Development of the film that became Zootopia began when Byron Howard had pitched six story ideas to Disney Animation chief creative officer and executive producer John Lasseter, of which three involved animal characters: an all-animal adaptation of The Three Musketeers, a 1960s-themed story about a "mad doctor cat...who turned children into animals", and a "bounty hunter pug in space". The common thread running through these ideas was that Howard wanted to do a film similar to Disney's Robin Hood, which also featured animals in anthropomorphic roles. According to Howard, Zootopia emerged from his desire to create something different from other animal anthropomorphic films, where animals either live in the natural world or in the human world. His concept, in which animals live in a modern world designed by animals for animals, was well received by Lasseter, who responded by embracing and lifting Howard "in the air like a baby Simba". Lasseter suggested that Howard should try combining the 1960s theme with the animal characters, especially the space pug. This led Howard to develop and pitch Savage Seas, an international spy film centered on an arctic hare named "Jack Savage" who was somewhat like James Bond. It was around this time that screenwriter Jared Bush was hired to work on the film; he was excited to work on a spy film because his own father and grandfather had worked for the Central Intelligence Agency.

Howard and Bush continued to develop the film with the assistance of the Disney Story Trust, the studio's top creative personnel who meet regularly to review and discuss all projects in development. The most delightful part of the spy film turned out to be its first act, set in a city created by and for animals. To focus on the all-animal city, Howard eventually dropped the 1960s setting, along with the espionage and international aspects, and changed the film into a contemporary police procedural in which Nick Wilde was the lead role and Judy Hopps was essentially his sidekick. For a while, "the filmmakers were very committed" to that version of the story, but then in November 2014, the filmmakers realized the film's plot would be more engaging if they reversed the roles to instead focus on Hopps as opposed to Wilde. The change in perspective involved dropping several characters, including two characters known as "The Gerbil Jerks" who were described as "trust-fund gerbils that had nothing better to do than harass Nick."

=== Pre-production ===
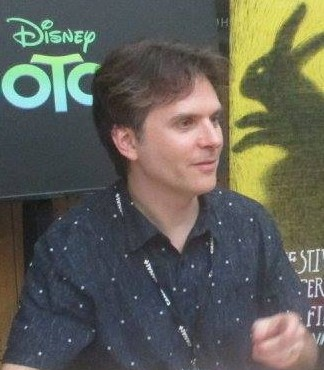
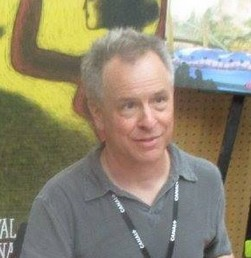
Directors Byron Howard and Rich Moore presented footage from the film at the 2015 Annecy International Animated Film Festival

In May 2013, The Hollywood Reporter initially reported that Howard was directing the film and that Jason Bateman had been cast, but little else about the film was known at the time. Zootopia was first officially announced on August 10, 2013, at the D23 Expo, with a March 2016 release date.

Research for the film took place in Disney's Animal Kingdom, as well as in Kenya and the San Diego Zoo Safari Park, where animators spent eight months studying various animals' walk cycles as well as fur color. Eight hundred thousand forms of mammals were created for and featured in the film. To make the characters' fur even more realistic, they also went to the Natural History Museum of Los Angeles County to closely observe the appearance of fur with a microscope under a variety of lighting. The filmmakers drew inspiration for Zootopia's urban design from major cities including New York City, San Francisco, Las Vegas, Paris, Shanghai, Hong Kong, and Brasília. To develop a city that could actually be inhabited by talking mammals ranging in size from two inches (5.1 cm) to 27 feet (8.2 m) and from drastically different climates, the filmmakers consulted Americans with Disabilities Act specialists and HVAC system designers. For assistance with designing motor vehicles appropriate for so many different types and sizes of mammals, the filmmakers consulted with J Mays, former chief creative officer of the Ford Motor Company. During the development process, Walt Disney Studios chairman Alan F. Horn suggested that Nick should expressly state his disappointment ("Just when I thought someone actually believed in me...") after discovering that Judy still fears him as a predator. In March 2015, it was revealed that Rich Moore (Wreck-It Ralph) had been added as a director of the film, in addition to Jared Bush (Penn Zero: Part-Time Hero) as co-director.

=== Animation ===
Disney's most recent work on animating fur was for the titular character of the 2008 film Bolt, but the software they had used at the time was not ready for creating the realistic fur of the animals of Zootopia. Therefore, the studio's IT engineers developed the fur-controlling software "iGroom", which gave character designers precise control over the brushing, shaping, and shading of fur and made it possible to create a variety of eccentric character styles for each animal. The software was also able to control an unseen "imaginary" under-layer that gave fur a degree of plushness not seen before. This feature was used to create characters like Officer Clawhauser, who has a big head that is entirely made of spotted fur. Characters with noteworthy numbers of strands of hair or fur included both of the two lead characters, Judy Hopps and Nick Wilde, who each had around 2.5 million hairs; a giraffe with nine million strands of fur; a gerbil with 480,000 strands; and a rodent with more strands of hair than the 400,000 that were on Elsa's head in Frozen.

Zootopia was the second time Disney used the Hyperion renderer, which they had first used on Big Hero 6. A new fur paradigm was added to the renderer to facilitate the creation of realistic images of the animals' dense fur. Nitro, a real-time display application developed since the making of Wreck-It Ralph, was used to make the fur more consistent, intact, and subtle much more quickly, as opposed to the previous practice of having to predict how the fur would work while making and looking at silhouettes or poses for the character. The tree-and-plant generator Bonsai, first used in Frozen, was used to make numerous variations of trees with very detailed foliage.

Zootopia was produced in makeshift quarters in a giant warehouse in North Hollywood (together with Moana) while Disney Animation's headquarters in Burbank was being renovated.

=== Casting ===
On May 6, 2015, Bateman and Ginnifer Goodwin were announced as having been cast, respectively, in the roles of Nick Wilde and Judy Hopps. The filmmakers chose Bateman because they wanted an actor who could bring "a funny yet heartfelt side" with "a wily, dry-witted sort of voice". Bateman described his character as "a crafty, sarcastic schemer", remarking on the role's similarity to many other roles he had done since he was 12. He explained that he had said to the directors: "'What kind of voice do you guys want me to do?' And they just looked at me like I was an idiot and said, 'Just do what you do. Just talk.'"

Commenting on the casting of Goodwin, Moore said that she brought "very centered sweetness, tremendous heart and a great sense of humor"; he described Judy as "a little Pollyanna mixed with Furiosa". Goodwin stated about her character: "People mistake kindness for naïveté or stupidity, and she is a good girl through and through. But she's not a dumb bunny."

=== Music ===
The film's score is composed by Michael Giacchino, in his first feature-length project for Walt Disney Animation Studios, as he previously worked on several short films and television specials produced by the studio, as well as multiple Pixar films. Recording took place from November 16–20, 2015, with an 80-piece orchestra conducted by Tim Simonec. In addition to her voice role of Gazelle, pop star Shakira also contributed an original song to the film titled "Try Everything", which was written by Sia and Stargate. The soundtrack was released on March 4, 2016, by Walt Disney Records.

== Marketing ==
The first teaser trailer was released online at Walt Disney Animation Studios' YouTube page on June 11, 2015. A second teaser trailer was released online again at Walt Disney Animation Studios' YouTube page on November 23, 2015, featuring a sequence of the film where the main characters encounter a Department of Mammal Vehicles (based on the DMV) run entirely by sloths. The official theatrical trailer for the film was released online at Walt Disney Animation Studios' YouTube page on New Year's Eve 2015. Figures of Judy Hopps and Nick Wilde were released for Disney Infinity 3.0 on March 1, 2016.

In addition, an ad agency contracted by the studio marketed the movie to the furry fandom demographic.

== Release ==
=== Theatrical ===
Zootopia was released on March 4, 2016, in Disney Digital 3-D, 4DX, RealD 3D, and IMAX 3D, making it the first Disney animated film shown in domestic IMAX theaters since Treasure Planet (2002). It was shown for the first time to the public as a feature film in an international competition for a young audience during the Brussels Animation Film Festival in Belgium on February 7, and was screened to the general media and audience on February 13.

In China, the state's SAPPRFT granted the film a rare two-week extension to play in theaters in addition to its limited 30-day run, which was to have ended on April 3.

=== Alternative titles ===
The film was retitled for theatrical release across several international territories. In the United Kingdom and some other European, Middle Eastern, and North African countries, the film was renamed Zootropolis, a reference to the concept of a "metropolis" rather than to that of a "utopia". This was due to Disney being unable to trademark the name "Zootopia" in these territories for various legal reasons, including Danish Givskud Zoo registering the name Zootopia in 2010. In Germany, the film was titled Zoomania due to a children's book by German author Kay Fischer titled Zootopolis released in 2010, which was found to be too similar to Zootropolis.

=== Home media ===
Zootopia was released by Walt Disney Studios Home Entertainment on Blu-ray, Blu-ray 3D, DVD, and Digital HD platforms on June 7, 2016. It includes some bonus material such as "Scoretopia", an alternate opening, and the music video to Shakira's "Try Everything". The film debuted at the top of the home media sales chart for the week ending on June 12, 2016. The film made a revenue of $89.6 million from home media sales with 4.4 million units sold, making it the third best-selling title of 2016 behind Star Wars: The Force Awakens and Finding Dory. Zootopia was released on 4K Blu-ray on November 5, 2019.

=== Re-releases ===
On June 22, 2020, amid the reopening of theaters due to the COVID-19 global pandemic, Disney announced that Zootopia, along with 11 other Disney owned titles, were to return to US theaters during a 4-week period. Zootopia returned to US theaters on June 26 and played through July 2, 2020, alongside The Avengers, and The Greatest Showman. The re-release grossed a total of $393,600.

On July 20, 2020, it was announced that the film would be returning to theaters in China, along with Big Hero 6 and the Chinese debut of Sonic the Hedgehog on July 31, 2020.

As part of Disney's 100th anniversary, Zootopia was re-released in Helios theaters across Poland on October 22, 2023.

== Reception ==
=== Box office ===
Zootopia grossed $341.3 million in the US and Canada and $682.5 million in other countries for a worldwide total of $1.026 billion, against a budget of $150 million. On March 18, 2016, the film reached the $500 million mark, becoming the third consecutive Walt Disney Animation Studios film to reach the milestone after Frozen (2013) and Big Hero 6 (2014). On April 5, it became the first film of 2016 to gross over $800 million in ticket sales, and on April 24, became the first film of 2016 to cross $900 million. On June 5, the film crossed the $1 billion mark, becoming the second film of 2016 to do so (after the studio's own Captain America: Civil War), the fourth animated film (after Toy Story 3, Frozen and Minions), the eleventh Disney film, the third Disney animated film, and the twenty-sixth film overall to reach the milestone.

Worldwide, it was the fourth-highest-grossing film of 2016 (behind Civil War, Rogue One, and Finding Dory), the second-highest-grossing animated film of 2016, the second-highest-grossing Walt Disney Animation Studios film (second-highest overall) of all time in its original release (after Frozen), the second-highest-grossing original film (behind Avatar), and the fourth-highest-grossing animated film of all time. Deadline Hollywood calculated the net profit of the film to be $294.9 million, when factoring together all expenses and revenues for the film, making it the fifth-most profitable release of 2016.

==== United States and Canada ====
In the United States and Canada, pre-release tracking suggested the film would open to $60–70 million from 3,827 theaters in its opening weekend. It played in 3,100 3D theaters, 365 IMAX theaters, and 325 premium large format screens. It earned $1.7 million from Thursday previews, a record for a non-Pixar Disney animated film, for an animated film opening outside of summer, and seventh-biggest all time for an animated film. Buoyed by good word of mouth, it earned $19.5 million on its opening day, also a record for a non-Pixar Disney animated film (breaking Frozen's record), and the second-biggest for a March animated film (behind Ice Age: The Meltdown). In its opening weekend, it scored a better than expected $75.1 million, which was the biggest non-Pixar Disney animated opening (breaking Big Hero 6's record), the biggest opening weekend among Walt Disney Animation Studios films (breaking Frozen's record), the biggest March animated opening (breaking The Lorax's record), the seventh-biggest March opening, and the tenth-biggest animated opening of all time. Furthermore, its opening weekend is also the fourth-biggest for an original film, behind The Secret Life of Pets, Inside Out, and Avatar. It also performed exceptionally well in IMAX, where the film brought in $5.2 million from 366 screens, the second-best animated IMAX opening behind only Toy Story 3 ($8.4 million).

In its second weekend, it fell gradually by 31% to $51.3 million and recorded one of the best holds for an animated film, more or less on par with Wreck-It Ralph's second weekend drop of 32%, but a bigger drop than The Lego Movie's 27%. It continued to top the box office for the third weekend, earning $37.2 million, falling by 28% from its previous weekend while passing the $200 million mark. This made it the second-biggest third weekend for a film that did not open at over $100 million, behind Avatar ($68 million) and ahead of Skyfall ($35 million). The film was overtaken by the superhero film Batman v Superman: Dawn of Justice in its fourth weekend, despite only a marginal decline. It spent a total of 13 consecutive weeks in the top ten, more than any other film except for Avatar (14 weeks) and Frozen (16 weeks) over the last decade.

It ended its theatrical run on August 4, 2016, after playing in theaters for a total of 154 days. It became the second-highest-grossing Walt Disney Animation Studios film (behind Frozen), the seventh-highest-grossing film of 2016, and the tenth-highest-grossing animated film of all time. In June 2020, due to the worldwide closure of cinemas during the COVID-19 pandemic and limits on which films played, Zootopia returned to 280 theaters—mostly drive-ins—and grossed $393,600.

==== Other countries ====
Zootopia received a scattered release as Walt Disney Studios Motion Pictures took advantage of school holidays in various markets. The film opened in a limited number of international markets in the weekend ending February 14, earning $4.5 million in three markets. It expanded to 22 markets in its second weekend, into 36% of its total international markets, and added $31.2 million. It added another $33 million in its third weekend with no new markets. In its fourth weekend, it expanded to 45 countries and grossed $64.7 million, coming in second place at the international box office, behind the Chinese film Ip Man 3. $3.3 million came from IMAX showings. It finally topped the box office in its fifth weekend after a strong second-weekend gross in China. It added $89.3 million from 45 countries, an increase of 25% from its previous weekend. It remained in first place for the second time in its sixth weekend, before Batman v Superman: Dawn of Justice took the top spot. It passed the $500 million mark in its eighth weekend.

In its opening weekend—which varied between markets—the film grossed $3.1 million in Spain and an additional $1.7 million in Belgium and Denmark. In Belgium, it had the biggest ever animated opening for a Disney or Pixar film. It broke opening records for a non-Pixar Disney animated film in China ($23.6 million), France ($8.1 million), Russia ($7.8 million), Germany ($6.6 million), Hong Kong ($1.5 million), Poland ($1.2 million), and India. It opened in the United Kingdom and Ireland with $7.5 million, Mexico with $4.6 million, Australia with $3.2 million, Brazil with $2.6 million, and in Italy, on a non-holiday weekend with $3.1 million. The film had number-one openings in Austria, Switzerland, Portugal, and South Africa. In the UK and Ireland, with significant competition from Batman v Superman: Dawn of Justice and the animated family film Kung Fu Panda 3, the film had a £5.31 million ($7.6 million) opening weekend from 579 theaters, including £1.74 million ($2.5 million) worth of previews, debuting in second place behind Dawn of Justice and falling just short of Walt Disney Animation Studios' best opening in the UK. It fell just 24% in its second weekend.

Zootopia's largest markets overseas are China ($235.6 million), followed by Japan ($70.1 million), Russia and the CIS ($39.2 million), Germany ($34.2 million), the UK ($34.2 million), France ($31.9 million), and South Korea ($31.6 million). In China, it is the highest-grossing Disney film in local currency (¥1.530 billion), surpassing Avengers: Age of Ultron (¥1.464 billion), as well as the seventh-highest-grossing film of all time. In Russia, it is the second-highest-grossing film of all time in local currency (₽2.3 billion), behind only Avatar (₽3.6 billion). It topped the Russian and German box office for three weekends, and the Chinese and Korean box office for two weekends.

In China, where it was locally known as Crazy Animal City (疯狂动物城), the film exceeded expectations and was considered Hollywood's biggest breakout success in China since 2015's Jurassic World made $229 million. It had an opening day of $3.4 million on its way to $23.6 million for its three-day opening weekend, debuting in second place and scoring the biggest non-sequel animated opening, as well as the second-biggest three-day opening and IMAX opening for an animated film, behind Kung Fu Panda 3. In its ninth day of release (a Saturday), it recorded the biggest single-day gross ever for an animated film, with $25 million (compared to $10.6 million on its first Saturday), and passed the lifetime total of Big Hero 6 to become the highest-grossing Disney animated film in China. In its second weekend, it grossed $60 million, an enormous increase of 139% from its previous weekend, and crossed the $100 million mark to become the third animated film in China to do so, after Kung Fu Panda 3 and Monkey King: Hero Is Back. This also marked the single best weekend for an animated film. In mid-March, the combined total of Kung Fu Panda 3 and Zootopia alone broke 2014's record of $286 million in box office grosses for American animated features in China. In its third weekend, it grossed $40 million for a total of $175 million, making it the highest-grossing animated film of all time in China. On March 27, its seventeenth day of release, it passed the $200 million mark, becoming the first animated film, the second Disney film, and the sixth Hollywood film overall to pass that milestone. It became the highest-grossing animated film of all time and the second-highest-grossing film of 2016, behind only The Mermaid.

It opened in Japan on April 23 and earned $4 million in its opening weekend, debuting at second place in the box office, behind Detective Conan: The Darkest Nightmare, and had the third-biggest Walt Disney Animation Studios debut in that market, behind Frozen and Big Hero 6. Deadline.com pointed out that the average opening number might have been due to the 2016 Kumamoto earthquakes, which could have affected moviegoers. In a rare achievement, it topped the box office in its third weekend after two weeks at No. 2. In the following two weekends, it continued to increase its ticket sales, and topped the box office there for four consecutive weekends. After four straight wins, it was finally overtaken by the R-rated superhero film Deadpool. It was the No. 1 western/Hollywood film for eight consecutive weekends. The Hollywood Reporter cited that strong word of mouth, audiences watching both the English and Japanese versions, and 3D and 4DX screenings, as well as a popular Japanese version of the "Try Everything" song by Dream Ami, all helped boost Zootopia's performance. Its strong run in the market aided the film to propel past the $1 billion mark worldwide. It remained in top three for 11 consecutive weekends and has grossed a total of $70.1 million there.

=== Critical response ===
On the review aggregator website Rotten Tomatoes, the film has an approval rating of 98% based on 298 reviews, with an average rating of 8.1/10. The website's critical consensus reads: "The brilliantly well-rounded Zootopia offers a thoughtful, inclusive message that's as rich and timely as its sumptuously state-of-the-art animation—all while remaining fast and funny enough to keep younger viewers entertained." On Metacritic, the film has a score of 78 out of 100, based on 43 critics, indicating "generally favorable reviews". Audiences polled by CinemaScore gave the film an average grade of "A" on an A+ to F scale, while those surveyed by PostTrak gave it a 90% overall positive score, with 87% saying they would "definitely recommend" it.

Neil Genzlinger of The New York Times considered the movie "funny, smart, [and] thought-provoking". Peter Travers of Rolling Stone wrote that Zootopia "may be the most subversive movie of" 2016, giving the film three-and-a-half stars out of four and praising its timely message about the harm of prejudice in the face of the prevailing xenophobic political rhetoric at the time of the film's release, and the film's humor. Peter Debruge at Variety opined that Zootopia "plays directly to the studio's strength". IGN reviewer Eric Goldman gave the film a 9.0 out of 10 'Amazing' score, saying "Zootopia is a wonderful example of how Disney, at its best, can mix its past and present together in a very cool, compelling way. It takes the classic animation trope of animals walking, talking, and acting like humans, but gives it a modern spin both in terms of its humor and animation style ... and also in its themes, which are meaningful and fascinatingly topical."

Writing in British Sunday newspaper The Observer, reviewer Mark Kermode:

Very funny, and very likable holiday treat... The ensuing drama is nominally a tale of predators succumbing to their animal instincts while frightened prey fear their neighbours. In fact, it's a delightfully well-orchestrated parable about trust and tolerance versus panic and prejudice. An encouragingly upbeat celebration of love and diversity in times of hate and uncertainty. If that all sounds overly on-message, then fear not—the jokes are funny, the characters engaging, and the animation packed with delicious visual detail... this is proper family fun with genuine cross-generational appeal. Hooray!

In the UK daily newspaper The Daily Telegraph, Robbie Collin noted, "The lion doesn't just lie down with the lamb, they run for City Hall on a joint ticket. It's the diversity dream come true. Or is it? […] Think Busytown by way of Chinatown. It's almost certain to be the most existentially probing talking animal cartoon of the year." Collin added, "Like Nick Nolte and Eddie Murphy in 48 Hrs., albeit considerably cuter, Judy and Nick make a hilariously strained but effective double act – not least thanks to Goodwin and Bateman's tremendous vocal work, which trips along with the effortless swing and snap of great bebop."

Matt Zoller Seitz of RogerEbert.com, despite generally liking the film (three out of four stars), had trouble with the film's central metaphor that conflicted with its message:

Zootopia is constantly asking its characters to look past species stereotypes, and not use species-ist language or repeat hurtful assumptions. This all seems clever and noble until you realize that all the stereotypes about various animals are to some extent true, in particular the most basic one carnivores eat herbivores because it's in their nature. If Zootopia were a bit vaguer, or perhaps dumber and less pleased with itself, it might have been a classic, albeit of a very different, less reputable sort. As-is, it's a goodhearted, handsomely executed film that doesn't add up in the way it wants to.

Also in The Daily Telegraph, Rosa Prince singled out the film's lead character, Judy Hopps, as a welcome change for Disney animated feature film heroines, such as the Disney Princess franchise. She found that unlike those characters' focus on romance or family loyalty, Hopps' focus is on her dream career as a police officer and serving her city.

=== Accolades ===
The film was chosen by the American Film Institute as one of the top ten films of 2016, and won the Academy Award, Golden Globe, Critics Choice Movie Award and Annie Award for Best Animated Feature Film. It also received a nomination for the BAFTA Award for Best Animated Film, which it lost to Kubo and the Two Strings.

=== Lawsuit ===
On March 21, 2017, a copyright infringement lawsuit was filed against Disney by Esplanade Productions, a company owned by Gary L. Goldman, the co-screenwriter of Total Recall. The lawsuit claims that Goldman (in 2000 and 2009) pitched a concept to Disney for a live-action film titled Looney, which was about a socially awkward animator who creates a self-inspired TV cartoon called Zootopia. Disney twice rejected the pitch, but Goldman accused the company of copying the name, themes, settings, and character tropes. Filed with the lawsuit was a graphic of early concept artwork of characters that are claimed to appear similar to major characters from the film, including Nick Wilde, Judy Hopps, Flash, and Chief Bogo. A Disney spokesperson described the lawsuit as being "ridden with patently false allegations". After months of back-and-forth deliberation between the two parties, US District Judge Michael W. Fitzgerald dismissed the infringement claims on November 8, 2017. As stated in the final review, "Goldman's effort to make the plots of Looney and Zootopia seem similar were strained. All the purported similarities between the two works were themes, not plot points or sequences of events, that were too general to be protected by copyright law." Esplanade appealed to the Ninth Circuit, which affirmed the dismissal on April 24, 2019.

== Other media ==
=== Merchandise ===
A card game based on the film called Zootopia: Suspect Search was released, as well as a game for mobile phones titled Zootopia Crime Files.

In May 2018, it was announced that a Zootopia graphic novel was set to be published by Dark Horse Comics. The graphic novel, titled Disney Zootopia: Friends to the Rescue, was written by Jimmy Gownley, with art by Leandro Ricardo da Silva. It was released on September 25, 2018.

=== Theme park attractions ===
On January 22, 2019, Disney Parks announced a themed area based on Zootopia was to be coming to Shanghai Disneyland, with construction on the land beginning on December 9, 2019. Construction halted for a brief period during the COVID-19 pandemic, but by June 2020, construction had resumed. The land opened to the public on December 20, 2023, which is part of The Walt Disney Company's 100th anniversary celebration. The land includes a trackless dark ride, Zootopia: Hot Pursuit.

On September 9, 2023, it was announced at Destination D23 that the It's Tough to Be a Bug! attraction at Disney's Animal Kingdom of Walt Disney World in Orlando, Florida would be replaced by a Zootopia show in the Tree of Life theater. The show was revealed to be titled Zootopia: Better Zoogether! in 2024, at the Disney Experiences showcase at D23, with a premiere of late 2025. The attraction opened on November 7, 2025.

=== Television spin-off ===
On December 10, 2020, during the Disney Investors Day livestream, Walt Disney Animation Studios announced that a television series entitled Zootopia+ was to premiere in 2022 on Disney+ as one of the studios' first television projects, as most TV shows based on Disney's animated films are produced by Disney Television Animation. It was announced to be an anthology series that would feature storylines that follow 3 sets of characters from the film (the mobster shrews, the tiger dancers, and the sloths). On November 12, 2021, Disney confirmed the series for a release in 2022, and also released a first-look teaser image which included characters from the film not previously confirmed to be in the series. The series was directed by Trent Correy and Josie Trinidad. It was released on November 9, 2022, with six shorts.

Among the episodes include an action parody starring Bonnie and Stu Hopps, a musical starring Duke Weaselton, a Real Housewives spoof with Fru-Fru, a film noir parody with Mr. Big, a dance competition parody with Clawhauser, Bogo, and Gazelle, and a romantic comedy parody with Flash and Priscilla. Judy Hopps and Nick Wilde cameo in the action parody and make other appearances throughout. All the cast members from the movie reprised their roles. The music is composed by Curtis Strong and Mick Giacchino (Michael's son), with Michael scoring the "Duke the Musical" episode with lyrics by Kate Anderson and Elyssa Samsel (Olaf's Frozen Adventure, Central Park).

=== Comic books ===
Dynamite Entertainment announced they would be publishing Zootopia comic books starting in January 2025.

== Sequel ==
In June 2016, Howard and Moore were in talks about the possibility of a Zootopia sequel. On February 8, 2023, Disney CEO Bob Iger announced that a sequel to Zootopia was in the works during the Disney 2023 Q1 investors call. Later that day, screenwriter and co-director Jared Bush confirmed that he is working on the film as director and writer, while Josie Trinidad, who had served as head of story for the first film alongside Jim Reardon, was confirmed as the sequel's co-director, making it her feature directorial debut. Ginnifer Goodwin, who voices Judy, told CinemaBlend that she would like to see a role reversal between Judy and Nick in the sequel. "I would like to see Nick have to be the one to convince Judy that the world is worth fighting for," she said. Jason Bateman, who voices Nick, also told CinemaBlend about his idea for the sequel: "The two of us [Nick and Judy] kicking ass out there. Cleaning up the streets. We're a couple of new cops out there. So, bad guys, be warned." On February 7, 2024, Iger revealed during the Disney 2024 Q1 investors call that the sequel has been titled Zootopia 2, and would be released on November 26, 2025. On August 9, 2024, Ke Huy Quan was announced to be playing Gary, while Bush was announced to be the sole writer and director of the film instead with Yvett Merino producing.
